= List of Bradford City A.F.C. players (1–49 league appearances) =

Bradford City A.F.C. is an English professional association football club based in Bradford, West Yorkshire. Bradford City been a member of the Football League since its formation in 1903. The following is a list of Bradford City players who have made fewer than 50 appearances in the Football League for Bradford City.

== Players with fewer than 50 league appearances ==
Name	Nation	Career (Note: Career refers to years from first to last league appearance)	Apps (Note: Matches in the Football League only. Substitute appearances are included)	Goals	Notes
Zema Abbey	England	2004–2005	6	1	
Robert Abel	England	1936–1937	14	0	
Tayo Adaramola	Republic of Ireland	2025	16	0	(Note: On loan from Crystal Palace)
Joe Adams	Guernsey	2024–2025	1	0	(Note: On loan from Wigan Athletic)
Harry Adamson	England	1934–1937	29	19	
Tony Adcock	England	1989–1991	38	6	
Dele Adebola	Nigeria	2004	15	3	(Note: Loan from Coventry City)
Tom Adeyemi	England	2010–2011	34	5	(Note: Loan from Norwich City)
Chisom Afoka	England	2023–2024	2	0	(Note: Loan from Aston Villa)
Paul Aimson	England	1967–1968	23	11	
Simon Ainge	England	2006–2009	14	0	
Carl Airey	England	1983	5	0	(Note: Loan from Barnsley)
Mark Aizlewood	Wales	1989–1990	39	1	
Hope Akpan	Nigeria	2018–2020	47	5	
George Alcock	England	1925–1927	15	9	
Jak Alnwick	England	2015	1	0	(Note: Loan from Newcastle United)
Jermaine Anderson	England	2019–2020	18	2	
Paul Anderson	England	2015–2016	14	0	
Sam Anderson	Scotland	1914–1919	14	3	
Thomas Anderson	Scotland	1920–1922	2	0	
Lee Angol	England	2021–2023	32	6	
Alun Armstrong	England	2003–2004	6	1	(Note: Loan from Ipswich Town)
Craig Armstrong	England	2005	7	0	
Paul Arnison	England	2008–2009	27	0	
Harrison Ashby	Scotland	2026	8	0	
Moses Ashikodi	Antigua and Barbuda	2007	8	2	(Note: Loan from Watford)
Alf Ashmore	England	1961–1962	9	0	
Beaumont Asquith	England	1948–1950	31	4	
Charlie Atkinson	England	1964–1965	16	1	
Chris Atkinson	England	2014	3	0	(Note: Loan from Huddersfield Town)
Reg Attwell	England	1954–1955	24	0	
Thomas Bagley	England	1937–1938	31	4	
David Bairstow	England	1971–1972	17	1	
Adam Baker	England	2012–2013	1	0	
Roy Baker	England	1973–1975	46	11	
David Ball	England	2018–2019	35	5	(Note: Loan from Rotherham United)
Arthur Bancroft	England	1926–1928	30	1	
Ian Banks	England	1988–1989	30	3	
Scott Banks	Scotland	2022–2023	29	6	(Note: Loan from Crystal Palace)
Steve Banks	England	2002	9	0	(Note: Loan from Bolton Wanderers)
Tommy Barkas	England	1933–1934	16	2	
Andy Barlow	England	1993	2	0	(Note: Loan from Oldham Athletic)
Phil Barlow	England	1965–1967	16	1	
Lachlan Barr	Australia	2017–2018	1	0	
Xavier Barrau	France	2007	3	2	
James Barrington	England	1920–1922	2	0	
Alex Bass	England	2022	21	0	(Note: Loan from Portsmouth)
Matthew Bates	England	2013–2014	22	0	
Jonathan Bateson	England	2009–2010	21	0	
Herbert Batten	England	1926–1927	24	5	
Ron Bayliss	Northern Ireland	1968–1970	39	0	
Ernest Beardshaw	England	1938–1939	42	0	
Nigel Beaumont	England	1985–1988	2	0	
Norman Beck	England	1930–1931	3	0	
Billy Beckett	England	1938–1945	5	1	
John Beckram	England	1903–1905	25	6	
Fred Bedford	England	1928–1929	9	8	
Jay Benn	England	2024–2025	12	0	(Note: On loan from Lincoln City)
Wayne Benn	England	1994–1995	10	0	
Charles Bennett	England	1905–1906	14	1	
Kyle Bennett	England	2014	18	1	(Note: Loan from Doncaster Rovers)
Mason Bennett	England	2014	11	1	(Note: Loan from Derby County)
Craig Bentham	England	2004–2008	30	0	
Marlon Beresford	England	2003	5	0	
Alexander Biggar	Scotland	1913	1	0	
Richard Birchall	England	1910	1	0	
Peter Bircumshaw	England	1962–1963	27	7	
Tommy Black	England	2006	4	0	
Ernest Blackburn	England	1922–1924	40	0	
Jim Blacker	England	1962–1965	21	0	
James Blair	Scotland	1910–1912	39	4	
Noel Blake	Jamaica	1991, 1992–1994	45	3	(Note: First spell on loan from Stoke City)
Tolaji Bola	England	2023	4	0	
Adam Bolder	England	2010	14	1	(Note: Loan from Millwall)
Paul Bolland	England	1997–1999	12	0	
Tony Bond	England	1910–1911	1	0	
Louis Bookman	Ireland	1911–1914	32	2	
Leonard Boot	England	1926–1927	7	0	
Sam Booth	Scotland	1954	15	0	
Rory Boulding	England	2008–2010	3	0	
Jordan Bowery	England	2015	3	0	
Ian Bowling	England	1993, 1993–1995	36	0	(Note: Initially on loan from Lincoln City)
Ted Braithwaite	England	1921–1924	17	2	
John Bramley	England	1922–1924	6	0	
Michael Branch	England	2003–2004	33	6	
Chris Brandon	England	2008–2010	27	2	
Robert Brannan	England	1947–1948, 1949	11	2	
Guy Branston	England	2011–2012	16	1	
John Brennan	England	1913–1914	11	0	
Samuel Bright	Scotland	1903–1904	6	0	
David Brightwell	England	1995–1997	25	0	
Craig Brown	Scotland	1914–1919	9	1	
David Brown	England	2008	5	1	
Bert Brown	England	1922–1923	6	1	
Jimmy Brown	Scotland	1948–1949	20	11	
Joe Brown	England	2005–2007	19	1	
Reece Brown	England	2010	3	0	(Note: Loan from Manchester United)
William Brown	Scotland	1938–1939	4	0	
Tom Brownlee	Scotland	1965	25	15	
Kai Brunker	Germany	2018–2019	26	0	
Michael Bryan	Northern Ireland	2011–2012	8	0	
Tony Buck	England	1972	3	0	(Note: Loan from Rochdale)
Frank Buckley	England	1913–1914	4	0	(Note: Left to fight in the First World War)
Wayne Bullimore	England	1995–1996	2	0	
Albert Bumford	Wales	1930–1931	10	0	
John Burckitt	England	1967	9	0	
Oliver Burke	England	2015	2	0	(Note: Loan from Nottingham Forest)
Reece Burke	England	2015–2016	34	2	(Note: Loan from West Ham United)
George Burkinshaw	England	1948–1949	12	0	
Rumarn Burrell	England	2021	2	0	(Note: Loan from Middlesbrough)
Peter Butler	England	1966–1967	17	0	
Reuben Butler	England	1924–1926	40	16	
Jacob Butterfield	England	2019	15	1	
Arthur Buttery	England	1937–1938	35	13	
David Byrne	Republic of Ireland	1927	3	1	
Neill Byrne	Republic of Ireland	2024–2026	35	3	
Paul Caddis	Scotland	2018–2019	27	1	
Jorge Cadete	Portugal	2000	7	0	(Note: Loan from Benfica)
Steven Caldwell	Scotland	2001–2002	9	0	
Davie Cameron	Scotland	1958–1959	7	2	
Rod Cameron	England	1957–1959	1	0	
David Campbell	Northern Ireland	1989–1990	35	4	
Joseph Campbell	England	1927–1928	1	0	
Benito Carbone	Italy	2000–2001	42	10	
Niall Canavan	Republic of Ireland	2021–2022	33	1	
Andrew Cant	Scotland	1922–1923	14	3	
Alf Carroll	England	1948–1950	28	0	
Joseph Carroll	England	1919–1920	1	0	
John Carruthers	England	1921–1923	4	0	
Geoff Carter	England	1967	1	0	
Tony Carter	England	1903–1906	30	0	
Dave Cartlidge	England	1961	6	3	
Mick Cartwright	England	1967–1968	1	0	(Note: Loan from Notts County)
Patrick Cassidy	England	1911–1912	4	0	
Graham Caulfield	England	1967–1968	1	0	
Phil Cavener	England	1983	9	2	(Note: Loan from Burnley)
Paul Chalmers	Scotland	1986	2	0	(Note: Loan from Celtic)
Gary Chapman	England	1988–1990	5	0	
Harry Chapman	England	2022–2024	47	2	
Ken Chapman	England	1954–1955	26	4	
Billy Chesser	England	1913–1914	7	2	
Jackie Chew	England	1954–1955	36	4	
Adam Chicksen	Zimbabwe	2017–2019	46	0	
Chibuzor Chilaka	Nigeria	2010–2011	4	0	
Steve Claridge	England	2005–2006	26	5	
Jim Clark	Scotland	1952	6	0	(Note: Loan from Exeter City)
John Clark	England	1912–1913	6	1	
James Clarke	England	1933–1936	9	0	
Matt Clarke	England	1999–2001	38	0	
Nathan Clarke	England	2015–2017	25	0	
Tom Clarke	England	2008	6	0	
William Clarke	England	1928	1	0	
Lewis Clarkson	England	2013–2015	1	0	
Adam Clayton	England	2023	14	0	
Tony Clegg	England	1984–1987	47	2	
Brian Close	England	1952–1953	6	2	(Note: Also a Test cricketer)
Hubert Cockroft	England	1946–1947	27	0	
Devante Cole	England	2015–2016	19	5	
Stan Collymore	England	2000–2001	7	2	
Luca Colville	England	2018–2019	11	1	
Alan Combe	Scotland	2002, 2003–2004	37	0	(Note: First spell on loan from Dundee United)
Jack Compton	England	2011–2012	14	0	(Note: Loan from Falkirk)
James Comrie	Scotland	1908–1910	43	0	
Alan Connell	England	2012–2014	42	8	
John Connelly	England	1910–1911	1	0	
Dylan Connolly	Republic of Ireland	2019–2020	28	1	(Note: Loan from AFC Wimbledon)
Bob Connor	England	1949–1951	28	0	
Jack Connor	England	1951	14	7	
Charles Cook	Scotland	1920–1922	7	0	
Colin Cook	England	1931	1	0	
Jeff Cook	England	1979	8	1	(Note: Loan from Stoke City)
Peter Cook	England	1950	1	0	
Andy Cooke	England	2005–2006	37	5	
William Cooke	England	1935–1938	21	2	
Billy Cooper	England	1946–1948	7	4	
Terry Cooper	Wales	1979–1981	48	2	
Thomas Corcoran	England	1929–1930	3	0	
Luke Cornwall	England	2003–2004	3	0	
Peter Costello	England	1988–1990	20	2	
Dara Costelloe	Republic of Ireland	2023	11	0	
Joe Coupland	Scotland	1950–1952	18	0	
Finn Cousin-Dawson	Northern Ireland	2019–2024	34	0	
Gordon Cowans	England	1996–1997	25	0	
Ollie Crankshaw	England	2021	25	1	
Romoney Crichlow	England	2022–2023, 2025	44	2	(Note: First spell on loan from Huddersfield Town)
Lee Crooks	England	2004–2006	47	1	
Geoff Crudgington	England	1971	1	0	
Mark Cullen	England	2011	4	0	(Note: Loan from Hull City)
Bob Cullingford	England	1970–1971	2	0	
Pat Curran	England	1947–1948	5	1	
Peter Currie	Scotland	1913–1919	17	2	
Jimmy Cuthbertson	England	1964–1968	28	7	
Chris Dagnall	England	2012	7	1	
Joseph Dalton	England	1933–1938	17	3	
Matty Daly	England	2022	9	1	
Mark Danks	England	2002–2004	3	0	
Alan Davies	Wales	1989–1990	26	1	
Clint Davies	England	2004	2	0	
Lawrence Davies	Wales	1997–1998	4	0	
Steve Davies	England	2015–2016	25	5	
Edwin Daw	England	1905–1906	16	0	
Luke Dean	England	2010–2012	3	0	
Amos Dee	Wales	1928–1929	1	0	
Nathan Delfouneso	England	2022	6	0	
Charles Dennington	England	1929–1930	18	0	
Roger Denton	England	1972–1974	30	0	
Matt Derbyshire	England	2023–2024	20	1	
Allan Devanney	England	1960–1961	12	4	
Archie Devine	Scotland	1910–1913	48	9	
Danny Devine	England	2016–2020	30	1	
Raffaele De Vita	Italy	2013–2014	20	1	
Jamie Devitt	Republic of Ireland	2011–2012, 2019–2020	12	1	(Note: First spell on loan from Hull City, second spell on loan from Blackpool)
Cheick Diabate	England	2024–2025	11	0	
Ryan Dickson	England	2013	5	1	(Note: Loan from Southampton)
Stuart Dimond	England	1945–1948	9	1	
Richard Dix	England	1952	8	1	
Ernie Dixon	England	1922	1	0	
Scott Dobie	Scotland	2011	13	0	(Note: Loan from St Johnstone)
Tommy Doherty	Northern Ireland	2010–2011	18	0	
Matthew Dolan	England	2014, 2014–2015	24	0	(Note: First spell on loan from Middlesbrough)
Eddy Donaghy	England	1924–1925	13	0	
Peter Donaghy	England	1923–1925	22	5	
Peter Donnelly	England	1965–1966	13	5	
Sandy Doolan	Scotland	1912–1920	22	0	
Tom Doonan	Scotland	1949–1950	13	7	
Andy Dow	Scotland	1994–1995	5	0	(Note: Loan from Chelsea)
Alfred Downey	Ireland	1920–1922	1	0	
Alan Dowson	England	1991–1992	18	0	
Thomas Drain	Scotland	1903–1905	32	12	
Adam Drury	England	2014	12	0	(Note: Loan from Leeds United)
Shane Duff	Northern Ireland	2010–2011	14	1	
John Duffy	England	1909–1910	1	0	
Matt Duke	England	2011–2013	42	0	
Jim Duncan	England	1960–1961	18	5	
Billy Durkin	England	1947–1948	28	1	
Ian Duthie	Scotland	1954–1956	28	4	
Bruce Dyer	England	2007	5	1	
Geoff Dyson	England	1947–1948	1	0	
Ryan East	England	2022–2023	18	0	
Andrew Easton	Scotland	1905–1906	14	0	
Simon Eastwood	England	2009	22	0	
Richard Eckersley	England	2010–2011	12	0	
Gareth Edds	Australia	2003–2004	23	0	
Richard Edghill	England	2005–2007	43	1	
Stan Edmondson	England	1946	3	0	
Trevor Edmunds	Wales	1928–1929	19	11	
John Egan	Republic of Ireland	2012	4	0	(Note: Loan from Sunderland)
Pat Egglestone	England	1943–1944, 1948–1949	2	0	
Abo Eisa	Sudan	2021–2023	18	2	
William Eley	England	1907	1	0	
Sidney Elliott	England	1934–1935	15	7	
Tom Elliott	England	2022	7	0	(Note: Loan from Salford City)
Kevin Ellison	England	2011	7	1	
Edward Embleton	England	1935–1937	3	1	
Fred Emery	England	1923–1924	5	0	
Charles Emmett	England	1925–1927	1	0	
Matthew Etherington	England	2001	13	1	(Note: Loan from Tottenham Hotspur)
Corry Evans	Northern Ireland	2024–2025	6	0	
Lee Evans	Wales	2015–2016, 2026	43	4	(Note: First spell on loan from Wolverhampton Wanderers)
Mark Evans	England	1988–1992	12	0	
Rhys Evans	England	2007, 2008–2009	49	0	(Note: First spell on loan from Blackpool)
Billy Exley	England	1952–1953	2	0	
Delroy Facey	Grenada	2002	6	1	
Craig Fagan	England	2011–2012	31	7	
Thomas Farnall	England	1903–1904	25	1	
Les Farnen	England	1949	8	0	
Gareth Farrelly	England	2003–2004	14	0	
Greg Fee	England	1982–1984	7	0	
Thomas Fenner	England	1933–1934	7	3	
Steve Fenton	England	1972–1973	10	1	
Robert Ferguson	England	1906–1907	9	3	
Tom Field	Republic of Ireland	2017–2018	8	0	(Note: Loan from Brentford)
Danny Flanagan	Ireland	1947–1948	13	6	
Patrick Flannigan	Scotland	1929–1930	1	0	(Note: Loan from Liverpool)
Gavin Fletcher	Scotland	1963–1964	8	1	
Mark Fletcher	England	1984	6	0	
Alex Flett	England	2011	1	0	
Caleb Folan	Republic of Ireland	2013	6	0	
Steve Foley	England	1995	1	0	
Jon Ford	England	1995–1996	19	0	
Tony Ford	England	1993	5	0	(Note: Loan from Grimsby Town)
Craig Forsyth	Scotland	2012	7	0	
Robert Forsythe	Northern Ireland	1948–1949	1	0	
Matty Foulds	England	2021–2023	44	2	
Fatty Foulke	England	1906–1907	22	0	(Note: Heaviest player ever to play professional football)
Richard Foulkes	England	1923–1925	35	0	
Jack Fowler	England	1924–1928	13	0	
Alan Fox	Wales	1965–1966	33	0	
Tyler French	England	2019–2021	16	0	
James Frew	Scotland	1924–1926	48	0	
Matt Fry	England	2012	6	0	
Dean Furman	South Africa	2008–2009	32	4	(Note: Loan from Rangers)
Ron Futcher	England	1986–1988	42	18	
Mick Gadsby	England	1970–1971	6	0 (Note: Loan from York City)	
Samuel Gallacher	Scotland	1924–1927	40	2	
Jack Gallon	England	1936–1938	20	5	
George Gane	England	1911–1914	35	0	
Steve Gardner	England	1991–1992	14	0	
James Garton	England	1906–1907	11	1	
James Garvey	England	1905	22	0	
Thomas Gascoigne	England	1926–1927	21	1	
Jason Gavin	Republic of Ireland	2003–2005	41	0	
Andy Geddes	Scotland	1949–1951	30	4	
Andy Gemmell	Scotland	1967	3	0	
Frederick Gibson	England	1937–1938	10	0	
George Gibson	England	1938–1939	3	0	
Jordan Gibson	England	2017–2020	22	1	
Willie Gildea	Scotland	1911	8	0	
Oliver Gill	England	2010	4	0	
Keith Gillespie	Northern Ireland	2009	3	0	
Matt Glennon	England	2010	17	0	
Peter Glover	England	1957–1958	1	0	
Jack Godsell	Scotland	1948–1951	9	0	
Eliot Goldthorp	England	2018–2020	2	0	
Ernie Goldthorpe	England	1919–1920	15	3	
Jimmy Gooch	England	1953–1954	22	0	
Curtis Good	Australia	2012–2013	3	0	
Les Gore	England	1938–1939	33	8	
Edward Gott	England	1904–1906	8	0	
Jonathan Gould	Scotland	1996–1997	18	0	
William Gould	England	1908–1909	18	2	
Arthur Graham	Scotland	1985–1987	31	2	
David Graham	Scotland	2006–2007	22	3	(Note: Loan from Sheffield Wednesday)
Harry Graham	Scotland	1910–1911	11	0	
Jimmy Graham	Scotland	1988–1990	7	0	
John Graham	England	1953–1954	18	1	
Jordan Graham	England	2014	1	0	
Gareth Grant	England	1997–2002	24	1	
Gavin Grant	England	2010	11	0	
Simon Grayson	England	2002	7	0	(Note: Loan from Blackburn Rovers)
Neil Grayston	England	1995–1996	7	0	
Peter Griffiths	England	1984	2	0	
Vince Grimes	England	1977	7	1	
William Grimes	England	1908–1910	17	1	
Billy Grimshaw	England	1913–1915	7	1	
Joel Grodowski	Germany	2017–2018	1	0	
Peter Gunby	England	1956–1957	3	0	
Kurtis Guthrie	England	2020–2021	10	0	
Callum Guy	England	2018	17	0	
Richard Guy	England	1903–1904	6	1	
Garry Haire	England	1983–1984	43	13	
Alan Hall	England	1930	11	4	
Proctor Hall	England	1906–1907	28	7	
Andy Halliday	Scotland	2014–2015, 2015	25	1	
John Hamer	England	1964–1965	1	0	
Bob Hamilton	Ireland	1933–1935	23	0	
William Hamilton	Scotland	1925–1927	13	3	
Alan Hampson	England	1956–1957	6	4	
Harry Hampton	Northern Ireland	1910–1914	47	0	
George Hannah	England	1965–1966	30	2	
Ross Hannah	England	2011–2013	19	2	
Martin Hansen	Denmark	2011	4	0	
Jacob Hanson	England	2017–2019	3	0	
John Hanson	England	1980	1	0	
Thomas Harban	England	2007	6	0	
Ron Harbertson	England	1950–1951, 1953–1954	29	4	
Cyril Hardcastle	England	1948–1949	4	1	
Harold Hardman	England	1909–1910	20	2	
Lawrence Hardy	England	1937–1938	12	2	
Alan Hargreaves	England	1951–1956	3	1	
Steve Harney	England	1969–1977	14	0	
John Harper	Scotland	1904	2	0	
Steve Harper	England	1995	1	0	
Kian Harratt	England	2022	5	0	
Bill Harris	Wales	1965	9	1	
Ryan Harrison	England	2010–2011	1	0	
John Harston	England	1949–1950	24	1	
Bill Hart	England	1947–1949	25	0	
David Harvey	England	1984–1985	6	0	
Edmund Harvey	England	1927–1928	45	15	
Irvine Harwood	England	1932–1933	5	0	
Archibald Hastie	Scotland	1938–1939	31	9	
Fred Haughey	England	1946–1947	3	0	
Cameron Hawkes	England	2018–2019	2	0	
Andy Haworth	England	2012	3	0	(Note: Loan from Bury)
John Hay	Scotland	1921–1922	3	0	
Colin Healy	Republic of Ireland	2006	2	0	
Ernest Heath	England	1914–1921	3	0	
Jack Hebden	England	1919–1921	3	0	
Alan Hebditch	England	1980–1982	2	0	
George Hedley	England	1910	2	0	
John Hellawell	England	1963–1965	48	13	
Thomas Helsby	England	1931–1932	34	0	
James Henderson	England	1904–1905	14	0	
Paul Henderson	Australia	2003–2005	40	0	
William Henderson	Scotland	1909–1910	4	0	
Lee Hendrie	England	2010	12	2	
Luke Hendrie	England	2017–2018, 2022–2024	31	0	(Note: First spell on loan from Burnley)
Adam Henley	Wales	2019–2020	24	0	
Karl Henry	England	2018	4	0	
Robert Hepple	England	1920–1921	3	0	
Dick Hewitt	England	1964–1965	20	7	
Dave Hibbert	England	2007	8	0	(Note: Loan from Preston North End)
Les Hick	England	1948–1950	1	0	
David Hill	England	1982–1983	5	1	
Jack Hill	England	1931	8	1	
Thomas Hill	England	1921–1924	12	0	
Stan Hillier	England	1924–1926	11	2	
Zavon Hines	England	2012–2013	32	2	
Jordy Hiwula	England	2016–2017	41	9	
George Hobson	England	1927–1928	24	2	
Eric Holah	England	1961–1962	4	2	
Lee Holmes	England	2006	16	0	
Micky Holmes	England	1985	5	0	
Bill Holmes	England	1953–1954	22	5	
David Hopkin	Scotland	2000–2001	11	0	
Alan Hopper	England	1965–1966	8	0	
Sam Hornby	England	2019–2022	24	0	
Louis Horne	England	2010–2011	1	0	
James Horton	England	1933–1936	3	0	
Bryce Hosannah	England	2020–2021	8	0	
Stan Howard	England	1960	18	6	
Russell Howarth	England	2005–2007	11	0	
Jeremy Howe	England	1991–1992	3	0	
Graham Howell	England	1971–1972	45	0	
Tommy Hoyland	England	1961–1963	27	6	
Ellis Hudson	England	2016–2018	1	0	
Geoff Hudson	England	1957–1959	34	0	
Maurice Hudson	England	1955–1956	4	0	
William Hughes	England	1914	1	0	
William Humphreys	England	1932	1	0	
Lewis Hunt	England	2010–2011	25	1	
Paul Huntington	England	2024–2025	19	0	
Frank Hyde	England	1948–1952	34	0	
George Ingledew	England	1926–1927	4	0	
Jimmy Isaac	England	1945–1947	24	3	
Thomas Isherwood	Sweden	2018–2019	3	0	
Ernie Islip	England	1927	6	1	
Zeli Ismail	England	2019–2021	14	1	
David Jackson	England	1978–1979	12	3	
David James	Wales	1935–1937	5	0	
Luke James	England	2015–2016	9	0	(Note: Loan from Peterborough United)
Norman James	England	1933–1936	4	0	
Henry Jamieson	England	1928–1929	2	0	
Oscar Jansson	Sweden	2011	1	0	
Bob Jefferson	England	1904–1906	30	6	
Iain Jenkins	England	1992	6	0	(Note: Loan from Everton)
Thomas Jenkinson	England	1914–1916	1	0	
John Jennings	England	1937–1945	28	0	
Albert Johnson	England	1947–1950	35	0	
Callum Johnson	England	2024–2025	11	0	
Ian Johnson	England	1994–1995	2	0	
Jermaine Johnson	Jamaica	2006–2007	27	4	
Joseph Johnson	England	1927–1928	1	1	
Owen Johnson	England	1946–1947	10	1	
Alan Jones	England	1979–1980	19	1	
Alex Jones	England	2017–2019	24	5	
Brad Jones	Australia	2015	3	0	
Graham Jones	England	1974–1979	4	0	
Jack Jones	Scotland	1946	2	1	
Ritchie Jones	England	2011–2013	36	1	
Samuel Jones	England	1971–1975	2	0	
Steve Jones	Northern Ireland	2008–2009	27	3	
Edward Joyce	England	1929–1930	1	0	
Eric Joyce	England	1946–1947	5	0	
Nick Joyce	England	1971–1972	5	1	
Nathan Joynes	England	2007	2	0	
Juanjo	Spain	2001–2003	26	1	
Chris Kamara	England	1994–1995	23	3	(Note: Retired as a player to become manager)
Charlie Keetley	England	1934–1935	22	4	
Frank Keetley	England	1929–1931	28	8	
Harry Keggans	Scotland	1911–1912	1	0	
Fiacre Kelleher	Republic of Ireland	2021–2023	9	0	
Doug Kelly	England	1955–1956	43	14	
John Kelly	England	1935–1936	5	0	
Gilbert Kemp	England	1919	1	0	
Ryan Kendall	England	2010	6	2	
Jason Kennedy	England	2013–2015	28	3	
Mick Kennedy	Republic of Ireland	1988–1989	45	2	
Ernest Kenworthy	England	1907–1908	2	1	
Alan Kernaghan	Republic of Ireland	1996	5	0	(Note: Loan from Manchester City)
Scott Kerr	England	2000–2001	1	0	
Brandon Khela	England	2025	15	0	(Note: On loan from Birmingham City)
Rob Kiernan	Republic of Ireland	2010–2011	8	0	
Cecil Kilborn	England	1921–1924	40	5	
Matthew Kilgallon	England	2016–2018	49	4	
George King	England	1952	23	9	
Gerald Kirk	England	1905–1906, 1907–1908	43	2	
Jock Kirton	Scotland	1953	8	0	
Andy Kiwomya	England	1995–1997	43	3	
Herbert Kneeshaw	England	1903–1904, 1907–1909	1	0	
Arnold Knight	England	1948–1949	7	0	
David Knowles	England	1966–1967	21	0	
William Knox	Scotland	1925–1927	11	0	
Rob Kozluk	England	2012	17	0	
George Kulcsar	Australia	1997–1998	26	1	
Ken Lambert	England	1954–1955	19	4	
Steve Lampkin	England	1983–1984	7	1	
Les Latcham	England	1973	15	2	
Caolan Lavery	Northern Ireland	2021–2022	19	1	
John Lavery	Northern Ireland	1948	5	0	
Craig Lawford	England	1989–1994	20	1	
Andy Lee	England	2002–2003	2	0	
Graeme Lee	England	2008–2009	44	2	
Tony Lee	England	1967	8	3	
Fred Leech	England	1945–1947	7	2	
Geoff Lees	England	1955–1956	3	0	
Harry Leese	England	1908–1909	1	0	
Greg Leigh	England	2015–2016	6	1	
Mike Lester	England	1982–1983	49	2	
Gerry Lightowler	England	1968	11	0	
Richard Lindley	England	1920–1921	15	4	
Tom Link	England	1948–1949	6	0	
Ron Liversidge	England	1956–1958	48	27	
Frank Lloyd	England	1951–1954	24	0	
Scott Loach	England	2008	20	0	
Gary Locke	Scotland	2001–2002	38	2	
Carlos Logan	England	2007	4	0	(Note: Loan from Darlington)
James Logan	Scotland	1905–1906	5	1	
Jackson Longridge	Scotland	2019–2021	3	0	
Harry Lovatt	England	1926	13	3	
Matty Lund	Northern Ireland	2018	10	2	(Note: Loan from Burton Albion)
Walter Lynch	England	1921	4	0	
Gary MacKenzie	Scotland	2015	11	1	(Note: Loan from Blackpool)
Robert McAlea	Northern Ireland	1948–1949	4	0	
Jim McAnearney	Scotland	1966–1968	45	5	
Steve McAnespie	Scotland	1997–1998	7	0	(Note: Loan from Fulham)
Oli McBurnie	Scotland	2013–2015	15	0	
Ian McCall	Scotland	1989–1990	12	1	
Mark McCammon	Barbados	2010	4	0	(Note: Loan from Gillingham)
Shay McCartan	Northern Ireland	2017–2020	45	8	
James McCloy	Scotland	1938–1939	37	0	
Patrick McConnell	Northern Ireland	1924–1925	3	0	
Jim McCusker	Northern Ireland	1957–1959	7	0	
Tommy McDermott	Scotland	1908	8	1	
David McDonald	Republic of Ireland	1992–1993	7	0	
Clive McFadzean	Scotland	1976–1977	4	2	
Roy McFarland	England	1981–1982	40	1	
Andrew McGeachen	Scotland	1904–1906	34	9	
Luke McGee	England	2020	4	0	
John McGinlay	Scotland	1997–1998	18	3	
Alex McGinn	Scotland	1914–1919	5	0	
Simon McGovern	England	1982–1984	1	0	
Ryan McGowan	Australia	2018–2019	26	0	
Joseph McGrae	England	1929	1	0	
Tommy McHale	England	1971–1973	36	0	
Frazer McHugh	England	2003–2004	5	0	
Michael McHugh	Republic of Ireland	1989–1994	31	4	
Frank McIlwraith	Scotland	1912–1913	5	0	
John McInnes	Scotland	1949–1951	21	6	
Tom McIntyre	Scotland	2025–2026	7	0	
Colin McKay	Scotland	1922–1923	26	4	
Fred McKee	Republic of Ireland	1912	1	0	
Billy McKinlay	Scotland	2000–2001	11	0	
Daniel McKinney	Northern Ireland	1923–1924	31	1	
Hugh McLaren	Scotland	1933–1935	24	1	
Paul McLaren	England	2008–2009	35	3	
Aaron McLean	England	2014–2015	33	6	
John McMorran	Scotland	1954–1955	1	0	
Paul McNally	England	1967–1969	3	0	
Tommy McQuaid	Republic of Ireland	1958–1960	23	2	
Lee Makel	England	2001	13	0	
Wingrove Manners	Barbados	1972–1973	1	0	
Lee Margerison	England	1992–1993	3	0	
Jack Marsh	England	1966–1967	12	0	
Joe Marsh	England	1919–1922	24	4	
James Marshall	Scotland	1914–1920	33	12	
Willie Marshall	Scotland	1957–1959	33	16	
Thomas Martin	Scotland	1911–1912	1	0	
Harry Maskrey	England	1909–1911	41	0	
Kevin McDonald	Scotland	2023–2024	19	0	
Carl McHugh	Republic of Ireland	2012–2014	30	2	
Marc McNulty	Scotland	2016–2017	15	1	(Note: Loan from Sheffield United)
Fred Mearns	England	1904–1906	21	0	
Lindon Medley	England	1930–1932	7	6	
Luke Medley	England	2007–2008	9	2	
Kevin Megson	England	1989–1991	27	0	
Michael Mellon	Scotland	2025	15	2	(Note: On loan from Burnley)
Ian Mellor	England	1982–1983	36	4	
Kelvin Mellor	England	2018–2020	44	2	
Andy Melville	England	1998	6	1	
David Melville	Scotland	1907–1909	7	0	
Jenson Metcalfe	England	2025–2026	41	2	
Alan Middlebrough	England	1948	4	0	
Glenn Middleton	Scotland	2020	3	0	
Jimmy Middleton	Scotland	1949–1950	8	0	
Craig Midgley	England	1995–1998	11	1	
Jack Milburn	England	1946–1947	14	3	
John R. Millar	Scotland	1948–1949	3	1	
John W. Millar	Scotland	1949–1952	44	7	
George Miller	England	2018–2019, 2019	39	3	(Note: First spell on loan from Middlesbrough, second spell on loan from Barnsley)
Peter Miller	England	1952–1956	18	2	
Mike Milner	England	1970	1	0	
Charles Mitchell	England	1906–1908	2	0	
Chris Mitchell	Scotland	2011–2012	11	1	
Peter Molloy	England	1938–1939	25	0	
Ray Molyneux	England	1948–1953	2	1	
TJ Moncur	England	2008, 2008	21	0	(Note: Both spells on loan from Fulham.)
Derek Montgomery	England	1968–1969	4	0	
Bill Montgomery	Scotland	1905–1907	17	3	
Tom Moon	England	1928–1929	47	17	
Everitt Moore	England	1903–1904	3	0	
Fred Moore	England	1927	6	3	
Liam Moore	England	2011	17	0	(Note: Loan from Leicester City)
George Mordue	England	1938–1939	7	0	
Darren Morgan	England	1989–1990, 1991–1992	13	0	(Note: First spell on loan from Millwall)
Llewellyn Morgan	Wales	1932–1933	1	0	
Josh Morris	England	2015–2016	13	1	
Owen Morrison	Northern Ireland	2004–2006	32	2	
Dave Mossman	England	1985	3	1	
Dylan Mottley-Henry	England	2014–2016, 2020, 2020–2021	20	0	
Louis Moult	England	2010	11	1	
Carl Muggleton	England	2001–2002	4	0	(Note: Loan from Cheltenham Town)
Willie Muir	Scotland	1907–1908	28	0	
Paul Mullin	England	2009	6	0	(Note: Loan from Accrington Stanley)
Paul Mullin	England	2026	9	0	(Note: Loan from Wrexham)
Thomas Mulloy	England	1923–1924	2	0	
Jimmy Mulvaney	Scotland	1951–1952	19	0	
John Murphy	England	1904	1	0	
John Murphy	Republic of Ireland	1909–1912	6	0	
Thomas Murray	England	1912–1914	6	1	
Tommy Mycock	England	1954–1955	21	3	
Ernest Myers	England	1914–1920	1	1	
Boaz Myhill	Wales	2003	2	0	
Tom Naylor	England	2012–2013	5	0	
Guylain Ndumbu-Nsungu	DR Congo	2007	18	6	
John Neilson	Scotland	1947–1948	29	11	
Scott Neilson	England	2009–2010	24	1	
Michael Nelson	England	2013	13	0	
Thierry Nevers	England	2023	8	0	
Mike Newell	England	1997	7	0	(Note: Loan from Birmingham City)
Peter Newlove	England	1966–1967	3	0	
Albert Newton	England	1926	4	0	
Bob Newton	England	1965–1966	20	4	
(Leonard) Frank Newton	England	1906–1907	17	5	
Frank Newton	England	1921–1922	1	0	
James Newton	England	1923–1925	5	0	
David Nicholls	England	1975–1976	4	0	
Phil Nicholls	England	1977–1978	21	2	
James Nightingale	Scotland	1905–1906	10	0	
Eric Nixon	England	1986, 1996	15	0	(Note: First spell on loan from Manchester City. Second spell on loan from Tranmere Rovers)
Ian Nolan	Northern Ireland	2000–2001	21	0	
Harry Noon	England	1962	1	0	
Horace Norton	England	1915–1921	12	1	
Lee Novak	England	2020–2021	23	8	
Jeff Nundy	England	1957–1960	32	0	
Lewis O'Brien	England	2018–	40	4	
Jamie O'Brien	Republic of Ireland	2009–2010	23	2	
Jim O'Brien	Republic of Ireland	2018–2019	11	0	
Timi Odusina	England	2022–2024	4	0	
Chris O'Grady	England	2009	2	0	
John O'Kane	England	1997	8	0	
John Oldfield	England	1972	31	0	
Stephen O'Leary	Republic of Ireland	2009–2010	1	0	
Raúl Oliveira	Portugal	1997	2	0	(Note: Loan from SC Farense)
Vadaine Oliver	England	2022–2025	49	3	
John O'Mara	England	1974	3	1	
Arthur Ormston	England	1926–1927	14	6	
Peter O'Rourke	Scotland	1903–1905	49	1	
Emmanuel Osadebe	Republic of Ireland	2022–2024	27	1	
Leon Osborne	England	2006–2011	37	1	
Steve O'Shaughnessy	Wales	1987–1988	1	0	
Aramide Oteh	England	2019–2020	18	4	(Note: Loan from Queen's Park Rangers)
Jackie Overfield	England	1964–1965	11	0	
Terry Owen	England	1970–1972	47	6	
Daniel Oyegoke	England	2023–2024	24		
Jack Padgett	England	1937–1938	2	1	
Gordon Pallister	England	1934–1938	28	0	
Matt Palmer	England	2019–2020	18	0	
Mike Pamment	England	1962–1965	1	0	
Ben Parker	England	2006–2007	39	0	
Ray Parker	England	1951–1952	41	1	
Colin Parry	England	1965	5	0	(Note: Loan from Stockport County)
Scott Partridge	England	1992–1994	5	0	
Thomas Pashley	England	1905	1	0	
Mark Paston	New Zealand	2003–2004	13	0	
George Pateman	England	1934–1935	1	0	
Omari Patrick	England	2017–2020	22	2	
Ronald Patrick	England	1938–1939	1	0	
Michael Patterson	England	1926–1927	11	1	
Jack Payne	England	2018–2019	39	8	
Billy Paynter	England	2007	15	4	(Note: Loan from Southend United)
Chris Pearce	Wales	1992–1993	9	0	
Henry Peart	England	1909–1913	13	0	
Frank Pegg	England	1931–1932	3	0	
Magnus Pehrsson	Sweden	1997	1	0	(Note: Loan from Djurgårdens IF)
Tom Penford	England	2002–2008	38	1	
William Penman	Scotland	1906–1907	15	1	
Matthew Penney	England	2017	1	0	
Dion Pereira	England	2022, 2022–2023	24	2	(Note: Both spells on loan from Luton Town)
Dan Petrescu	Romania	2000–2001	17	1	
Bobby Petta	Netherlands	2005–2006	31	4	
Andy Petterson	Australia	1994	3	0	(Note: Loan from Charlton Athletic)
Scott Phelan	England	2007–2008	13	0	
Thomas Pickard	England	1931–1932	6	0	
Mick Pickering	England	1983	4	0	
Jordan Pickford	England	2014–2015	33	0	
Albert Pickles	England	1927	2	0	
Lenny Pidgeley	England	2010–2011	21	0	
Sérgio Pinto	Portugal	1996–1997	18	0	
Dominic Poleon	England	2017–2018	32	6	
Lee Power	Republic of Ireland	1994–1995	30	5	
Max Power	England	2025–2026	44	0	
Jack Preece	England	1938–1939	3	0	
Cecil Price	Wales	1949–1950	7	0	
Jason Price	Wales	2010–2011	10	1	(Note: Loan from Carlisle United)
Robert Pringle	England	1922–1924	31	0	
Harry Pritchard	England	2019–2021	37	5	
Jamie Proctor	England	2016, 2016	18	5	(Note: First spell on loan from Fleetwood Town)
Michael Proctor	England	2002	12	4	
Ben Prosser	England	1903–1904	15	1	
Mark Prudhoe	England	1997–1998	8	0	
Bill Punton	England	1975–1977	7	0	
Daniel Pybus	England	2017–2018	2	0	
Jimmy Quinn	Northern Ireland	1989	35	14	
Peter Quinn	England	1919	4	1	
Vincent Rabiega	Poland	2016–2017	1	0	
Lukas Raeder	Germany	2017–2018	1	0	
Craig Ramage	England	1997–1999	35	1	
Isaiah Rankin	England	1998–2001	37	4	
David Ratcliffe	England	1975–1978	28	1	
George Ray	England	1927–1929	2	0	
Warren Rayner	England	1975–1977	17	0	
Wallace Rea	Scotland	1959–1960	11	2	
Adam Reach	England	2014	18	3	
Paul Reaney	England	1978–1980	38	0	
Brian Redfearn	England	1964	7	2	
Neil Redfearn	England	1999–2000	17	1	
Levi Redfern	England	1932–1933	6	0	
Edwin Rees	Wales	1925–1926	2	0	
Jake Reeves	England	2017–2020	43	1	
Terry Regan	England	1948–1950	1	0	
Erik Regtop	Netherlands	1996	8	1	
Adam Reed	England	2011	4	0	
Paul Reid	Australia	2002–2004	8	2	
Wes Reid	England	1991–1992	35	3	
Alan Rodes	England	1964–1965	7	0	
Alex Rhodes	England	2007–2008	28	3	
Ron Rice	England	1946	1	0	
Lewis Richards	Republic of Ireland	2023–2026	48	2	
Ben Richards-Everton	England	2019–2021	42	2	
Tony Richardson	England	1962–1963	2	1	
Joe Riley	England	2018–2020	6	0	
John Ritchie	England	1972	20	0	
Tommy Robb	Scotland	1919–1921	11	1	
Ben Roberts	England	1996	2	0	
James Roberts	Wales	1905–1908	24	0	(Note: City's first international player)
John Roberts	Australia	1968–1970	44	0	
Neil Roberts	Wales	2004	3	1	(Note: Loan from Wigan Athletic)
Jimmy Robertson	England	1938–1942	36	17	
Lammie Robertson	Scotland	1979–1981	43	3	
Theo Robinson	Jamaica	2021–2022	23	2	
Tyrell Robinson	England	2017–2020	23	3	
Norman Robson	England	1933–1934	20	9	
Ray Robson	England	1950–1952	10	0	
Nialle Rodney	England	2011–2012	5	0	
Bruno Rodriguez	France	1999	2	0	(Note: Loan from Paris Saint-Germain)
Alan Rogers	England	2006–2007	8	0	
Jim Rollo	Scotland	1964–1966	37	0	
Philip Rookes	England	1936–1938	11	0	
David Roper	England	1962–1963	13	0	
Jack Roscamp	England	1932–1934	27	0	
Willie Ross	Scotland	1950	4	2	
Christopher Routis	France	2014–2016	28	2	
Danny Rowe	England	2021	18	5	
Dominic Rowe	England	2011–2012	2	0	
Jake Ruecroft	England	1948–1949	43	0	
Arthur Rutter	England	1909–1910	3	0	
Jim Sample	England	1947–1948	8	2	
Austin Samuels	England	2020–2021	12	0	(Note: Loan from Wolverhampton Wanderers)
Kevin Sanasy	England	2002–2005	9	1	
Olly Sanderson	England	2024–2025	13	2	
Christian Sansam	England	1996	1	0	
William Sarvis	Wales	1925	1	0	
Marco Sas	Netherlands	1996–1997	31	3	
Rouven Sattelmaier	Germany	2016–2018	13	0	
Dean Saunders	Wales	1999–2001	44	3	
Wes Saunders	England	1985	4	0	
Robbie Savage	England	1986–1987	11	0	
Brian Sawyer	England	1962–1964	15	2	
Kian Scales	England	2020–2023	22	1	
Sean Scannell	Republic of Ireland	2018–2019	21	1	
Wayne Scargill	England	1993–1994	1	0	
Ernie Schofield	England	1945–1947	1	1	
Mark Schwarzer	Australia	1996–1997	13	0	
James Scott	Scotland	1905–1906	2	0	
John Scott	England	1961–1963	11	2	
Laurie Scott	England	1935–1937	39	0	
Stan Scrimshaw	England	1938–1947	20	0	
Sherwin Seedorf	Netherlands	2018–2019	6	0	
Marcel Seip	Netherlands	2011–2012	23	1	
Harold Senior	England	1927–1929	6	1	
Dennis Sepp	Netherlands	1998	3	0	
Arthur Sewell	England	1954–1955	1	0	
Arthur Seymour	England	1903–1904	34	0	
Stan Seymour	England	1912	1	0	
Mo Shariff	England	2014	1	0	
Luke Sharry	England	2009–2010	2	0	
William Shaw	England	1921–1923	15	4	
Alan Sheehan	Republic of Ireland	2014–2016	25	1	
Albert Shepherd	England	1914–1915	22	10	
Jack Shepherd	England	2024–2025	39	2	(Note: On loan from Barnsley)
Wilf Shergold	England	1966–1968	28	2	
George Sheridan	England	1952	12	1	
James Shinner	England	1904	4	4	
Alex Shirley	Scotland	1947	1	0	
Louie Sibley	England	2026	4	0	(Note: Loan from Oxford United)
Jorge Sikora	Poland	2019–2022	1	0	
Tommy Sinclair	England	1951–1952	9	0	
Harpal Singh	England	2002–2003	3	0	
Jack Slemin	Ireland	1909–1910	3	0	
James Smailes	England	1938–1939	34	13	
Bryan Small	England	1997–1998	5	0	
Deane Smalley	England	2012	13	0	
Albert Smith	England	1926–1927	17	5	
Brian Smith	England	1977	8	0	
Fred Smith	England	1954	9	3	
George Smith	Wales	1933	1	0	
Gerry Smith	England	1960–1961	7	0	
Herbert Smith	England	1925–1926	5	0	
James Smith	England	1937	1	0	
John Smith	England	1923–1926	38	6	
Tyler Smith	England	2023–2025	43	5	
William Smith	England	1908–1909	3	0	
Matthew Smithard	England	1996	1	0	
Neville Southall	Wales	2000	1	0	
Alex Spark	Scotland	1976–1978	34	0	
Jake Speight	England	2010–2011	28	4	
William Spence	England	1927–1928	2	1	
Barry Squires	England	1954–1955	7	0	
Chris Stabb	England	1995	1	0	
Mark Stallard	England	1996, 1996–1997	43	10	(Note: Initially on loan from Derby County)
Michael Standing	England	2002–2004	30	2	
Jack Stansfield	England	1919–1922	2	0	
Ben Starosta	Poland	2008	15	0	
Reece Staunton	Republic of Ireland	2017–2022	10	1	
Steve Staunton	Republic of Ireland	1987	8	0	
Jon Stead	England	2014, 2014–2015	40	6	(Note: Both spells on loan from Huddersfield Town)
Tim Steele	England	1993–1994	11	0	
Darren Stephenson	England	2011–2012	1	0	
Jordan Stevens	England	2021	16	0	
James Stevenson	Scotland	1929–1931	10	1	
Damion Stewart	Jamaica	2005–2006	23	1	(Note: Loan from Harbour View)
George Stewart	Scotland	1959–1961	22	0	
Mark Stewart	Scotland	2011–2012	12	0	
Ernest Storey	England	1911–1913	3	0	
George Stott	England	1931–1932	5	0	
Jack Street	England	1951–1952	1	0	
Mark Stuart	England	1990–1992	29	5	
Sam Stubbs	England	2023–2025	44	1	
Ole Bjørn Sundgot	Norway	1996–1997	25	6	
Robert Swain	England	1961–1963	7	0	
Stuart Swales	England	1937–1938	13	0	
John Swift	England	2004–2007	12	0	
Bert Swindells	England	1938	15	5	
George Swindin	England	1934–1936	26	0	
Michael Symes	England	2004–2006	15	3	
Tibor Szabo	England	1978–1979	13	1	
Barry Tait	England	1961–1962	20	10	
Sean Taylforth	England	2007–2009	1	0	
Andrew Taylor	England	2005–2006	24	0	
Archie Taylor	England	1967–1968	11	0	
Ash Taylor	Wales	2023–2024	12	0	
Charlie Taylor	England	2012	3	0	
Chris Taylor	England	2019–2020	14	0	
David Taylor	Scotland	1910–1911	45	1	
John Taylor	England	1946–1947	2	0	
John Taylor	England	1956	1	0	
John Taylor	England	1994–1995	36	11	
Matt Taylor	England	2013–2014	2	0	
Paul Taylor	England	2017–2018	26	6	
Laurens ten Heuvel	Netherlands	2003	5	0	
Alfred Thomas	England	1921–1923	14	1	
Andy Thomas	England	1988–1989	23	5	
Wes Thomas	England	2016	10	1	
Ian Thomas-Moore	England	1996	6	0	(Note: Loan from Tranmere Rovers)
Adam Thompson	Northern Ireland	2017–2018	9	0	
Alan Thompson	England	1979–1981	31	0	
Jimmy Thompson	England	1965–1966	24	1	
Sydney Thompson	England	1911–1912	1	0	
Aidey Thorpe	England	1985–1987	17	1	
Tom Thorpe	England	2016	2	0	
Oscar Threlkeld	England	2021–2023	22	0	
Jim Tierney	Scotland	1960–1962	2	0	
Paul Tierney	Republic of Ireland	2004–2005	14	0	
Curtis Tilt	Jamaica	2025–2026	32	0	
Andy Tod	Scotland	2001, 2001–2003	35	5	(Note: Initially on loan from Dunfermline Athletic)
Lee Todd	England	1998–2000	15	0	
Jonathan Tomkinson	United States	2023–2024	23	0	
Graeme Tomlinson	England	1993–1994, 2002	17	6	
Kevin Toner	Republic of Ireland	2017	2	1	
Ray Tong	England	1963–1965	20	2	
Willy Topp	Chile	2007–2008	13	0	
Harry Travis	England	1935–1937	44	20	
Darren Treacy	England	1990–1991	16	2	
Sol Tremelling	England	1913–1919	2	0	
Ernie Tuckett	England	1937–1938	13	4	
Rayhaan Tulloch	England	2023–2024	8	1	(Note: Loan from West Bromwich Albion)
Peter Turbitt	England	1969–1971	8	0	
Blair Turgott	England	2012–2013	4	0	
Ross Turnbull	England	2004	2	0	
George Turner	England	1934–1935	16	2	
William Tyler	England	1926–1927	11	0	
Gus Uhlenbeek	Netherlands	2002–2003	42	1	
Joseph Urwin	England	1930–1931	1	0	
Nico Vaesen	Belgium	2003–2004	6	0	
Jari Vanhala	Finland	1996	1	0	
Jimmy Vallance	Scotland	1907–1910	3	0	
James Vaughan	England	2019–2020	25	11	
Daniel Verity	England	1997–1998	1	0	
Etienne Verveer	Netherlands	1995	9	1	
Haris Vučkić	Slovenia	2016–2017	10	1	
George Waddell	Scotland	1914–1920	23	0	
Chris Waddle	England	1996–1997	25	6	
Noah Wadsworth	England	2022–2024	2	0	
Billy Walker	Scotland	1911–1913	5	0	
Bruce Walker	England	1968–1969	28	1	
Geoff Walker	England	1957–1958	2	0	
Mickey Walker	England	1964–1966	20	1	
Robert Walker	England	1920–1924	1	0	
Fred Wallbanks	England	1932–1934	15	0	
Ronnie Wallwork	England	2004	7	4	
Kevin Walsh	England	1954–1956	25	3	
Ken Walshaw	England	1950–1951	9	3	
Mick Walters	England	1962–1963	19	0	
Stephen Warnock	England	2002, 2018	25	1	(Note: First spell on loan from Liverpool; second spell on loan from Burton Albion)
Gavin Ward	England	1995–1996	36	0	
John Ward	England	1927–1928	5	0	
Syd Ward	England	1947–1948	2	0	
Fred Warnes	England	1934–1938	3	1	
William Wass	England	1946–1947	7	1	
Andrew Watson	Scotland	1922–1923	7	0	
Gordon Watson	England	1996–1999	21	5	
Reginald Weaver	England	1932–1933	8	3	
Reece Webb-Foster	England	2014–2018	2	0	
Andy Webster	England	1964–1967	12	1	
Billy Webster	England	1932–1933	16	4	
Spencer Weir-Daley	England	2007	5	1	
Ashley Westwood	England	1998–2000	24	2	
Alec Whaites	England	1904–1907	12	0	
Simon Whaley	England	2009	6	1	
Kenny Wharton	England	1989–1990	5	0	
Ethan Wheatley	England	2026	12	0	
Cornelius White	England	1928–1929	4	4	
Eddie White	Scotland	1959	4	1	
Joe White	England	2026	4	0	
Malcolm White	England	1965	9	0	
Phil Whitehead	England	1992	6	0	
Albert Whitehurst	England	1929–1931	38	30	
Fred Whittaker	England	1908–1909	9	1	
Ernest Whitter	England	1922–1924	1	0	
Bob Whittingham	England	1909–1910	45	31	
Dennis Widdop	England	1954–1955	1	0	
Aaron Wilbraham	England	2006	5	1	(Note: Loan from Milton Keynes Dons)
Edward Wilby	England	1946–1947	3	0	
George Wild	England	1913–1914	2	1	
Robert Wilde	England	1914–1921	4	0	
Chris Wilder	England	1997–1998	42	0	
Mike Wilkins	England	1959–1960	1	0	
Albert Wilkinson	England	1950–1951	2	0	
Algernon Wilkinson	England	1919–1923	12	0	
Joe Wilkinson	England	1959	17	0	
Darren Williams	England	2007–2008	28	0	
George Williams	England	1956–1957	6	0	
Graham Williams	Wales	1955–1956	8	2	
Louis Williams	England	1908–1909	10	0	
Jimmy Willis	England	1991–1992	9	1	
Adam Wilson	Kenya	2023–2025	10	1	
Ben Wilson	England	2018–2019	4	0	
Clare Wilson	England	1907–1908	2	0	
David Wilson	Scotland	1904–1906	12	1	
Dave Wilson	England	1972	5	0	
Kevin Wilson	Northern Ireland	1993–1994	5	0	
Ray Wilson	England	1970–1971	2	0	
William Wilson	England	1934–1939	1	0	
Albert Wise	England	1907–1908	22	0	
Don Woan	England	1952–1954	21	0	
Rob Wolleaston	England	2003–2004	14	1	
Ray Wood	England	1965–1966	32	0	
Calum Woods	England	2019	6	0	
Neil Woods	England	1990	14	2	
Reuben Woolhouse	England	1930–1932	26	5	
Charlie Woollett	England	1946–1949	43	5	
Reg Worsman	England	1956	1	0	
Eric Worthington	England	1953	2	1	
Jon Worthington	England	2011, 2011	16	0	(Note: First spell on loan from Oldham Athletic)
Thomas Wren	England	1928–1930	2	0	
Jake Wright	England	2006	1	0	
Joe Wright	Wales	2025–2026	28	3	
Josh Wright	England	2018–2019	18	0	
Stephen Wright	Scotland	1998–2000	22	0	
Tommy Wright	Scotland	1995–1997	45	5	
John Wyllie	Scotland	1912–1913	24	0	
Richard Yeates	England	1924–1925	3	0	
Terry Yorath	Wales	1983–1984	27	0	
Allan York	England	1965–1967	45	2	
Kelly Youga	(Central African Republic) C.A.F.	2006–2007	11	0	
Jake Young	England	2022–2024	11	2	
John Young	Scotland	1910–1911	10	8	
Robert Zabica	Australia	1997–1998	3	0	
François Zoko	Ivory Coast	2014–2015	16	1	

== Sources ==
- List of Bradford City A.F.C. players at Post War English & Scottish Football League A–Z Player's Transfer Database
- Soccerbase
- Frost, Terry (1988). Bradford City A Complete Record 1903–1988. Breedon Books Sport. ISBN 0-907969-38-0.
