= Worsman =

Worsman is a surname. Notable people with the surname include:

- Colette Worsman, American politician
- Reg Worsman (1933–2018), English footballer

== See also ==
- Worsham
