= Ken Chapman =

Ken Chapman is the name of:

- Ken Chapman (footballer, born 1932), English footballer
- Ken Chapman (footballer, born 1948), English footballer
