= Peter Quinn =

Peter Quinn may refer to:

== Sports ==
- Peter Quinn (footballer, born 1892) (1892–1976), English footballer
- Peter Quinn (forward), English footballer
- Peter Quinn (Gaelic footballer) (1925–2016), Irish Gaelic footballer
- Peter Quinn (sports administrator), served as president of the Gaelic Athletic Association from 1991 until 1994

== Other people ==
- Peter Quinn (admiral), Australian naval officer
- Peter Quinn (astronomer) (born 1955), head of the Data Management Division at the European Southern Observatory
- Peter Quinn (bishop) (1928–2008), Australian bishop
- Peter Quinn (MP), Irish Conservative Party member of the Parliament of the United Kingdom
- Peter A. Quinn (1904–1974), U.S. congressman
- Peter H. Quinn (1873–1931), U.S. soldier
- Peter J. Quinn, information technology worker
- Peter Quinn (Homeland), character in Homeland TV series
