= Robert Forsyth =

Robert Forsyth or Forsythe may refer to:

- Robert Forsyth (bishop) (born 1949), Australian Anglican bishop
- Robert Forsyth (writer) (1766–1845), Scottish writer
- Robert Campbell Forsyth (1934–2020), Scottish footballer
- Robert Forsythe (footballer) (1925–2016), Northern Irish footballer
- Robert E. Forsythe, American economist
- Robert Forsythe (politician), New Hampshire state representative
- Robert Forsyth (law enforcement officer), the first United States federal law enforcement officer to be killed in the line-of-duty

== See also ==
- Robert Forsyth Macgeorge (1796–1859), early settler of South Australia
- Robert Forsyth Scott (1849–1933), British mathematician and barrister
