= Sydney Ward =

Sydney Ward is the name of:

- Sydney Ward (cricketer) (1907–2010), Australian-born New Zealand cricketer
- Sydney Ward (footballer) (born 1923), English footballer
- Sydney Ward (politician) (1903–1988), Australian politician
