= Shergold (surname) =

Shergold is a surname. Notable people with the surname include:

- Adrian Shergold, British film and television director
- Bevis Shergold, née Bevis Reid (1919–1997), British track and field athlete
- Billy Shergold, Welsh footballer
- Craig Shergold (born 1979), British cancer patient who received 350 million greeting cards, a world record
- Peter Shergold (born 1946), Australian academic
- Wilf Shergold (born 1943), English footballer
