= Charles Emmett =

Charles Emmett may refer to:

- Charles Emmett, copilot of USAir Flight 427
- Charles Emmett, guest star in the Star Trek Voyager episode "Warlord"
- Charles Emmett (footballer), English professional footballer
