= Norman Beck =

Norman Beck is the name of:

- Norman A. Beck (born 1932), American pastor
- Norman Beck (footballer), English footballer
