= Rod Cameron =

Rod Cameron may refer to:

- Rod Cameron (actor) (1910–1983), Canadian actor
- Rod Cameron (footballer) (born 1939), English footballer
- Roderick Cameron (businessman) (1825–1900), Canadian-American businessman
- Roderick Cameron (traveler) (1913–1985), American travel writer
- Rodney Francis Cameron (1952–2025), Australian serial killer
