= William Penman =

William Penman is the name of:

- William H. Penman (1858–1917), American politician
- William Penman (rugby union) (1917–1943), Scottish rugby union player
- William Penman (footballer) (1886–1907), Scottish footballer
- Willie Penman (footballer, born 1922) (1922–2005), Scottish footballer
- Willie Penman (footballer, born 1939) (1939–2017), Scottish footballer
