= David Roper =

David Roper is the name of:

- David Roper (actor) (born 1944), English actor
- David Roper (footballer) (1944–2005), English footballer
