= Bob Connor =

Bob Connor is the name of:

- Bob Connor (footballer), English footballer
- Bob Connor (politician), American politician
