= Terry Regan (footballer) =

English footballer (1926–2020)

Personal information
- Full name: Terence Regan
- Date of birth: 26 June 1926
- Place of birth: White Abbey, Bradford, England
- Date of death: 23 October 2020 (aged 94)
- Position: Right winger

Senior career*
| Years | Team | Apps | (Gls) |
- Salts
| 1948–1950 | Bradford City | 1 | (0) |
- Salts
- * Club domestic league appearances and goals

Terence Regan (26 June 1926 – 23 October 2020) was an English footballer who played as a right winger.

== Early and personal life ==
Regan was born in White Abbey, Bradford. He was married, with his wife dying of cancer in 1987.

== Career ==
Regan spent time in the Army between 1945 and 1948.

Regan joined Bradford City from Salts in October 1948. He made 1 league appearance for the club, before returning to Salts in 1950. He left Bradford City after the club offered to make him a professional.

Regan later worked in the greetings card business, for Sharpes Classic and also for his own company, for 26 years.

== Later life ==
Regan retired to Ilkley. He released his autobiography to local libraries in October 2011, at the age of 85, to raise money for charity. He died on 23 October 2020, at the age of 94.

== Sources ==
- Frost, Terry (1988). Bradford City A Complete Record 1903-1988. Breedon Books Sport. ISBN 0-907969-38-0.
