= Phil Barlow =

English footballer (1946–2019)

Personal information
- Full name: Philip Douglas Barlow
- Date of birth: 19 December 1946
- Place of birth: Shipley, England
- Date of death: December 2019 (aged 72)
- Position: Half back

Senior career*
| Years | Team | Apps | (Gls) |
- Guiseley
| 1965–1967 | Bradford City | 16 | (0) |
| 1967–1968 | Lincoln City | 5 | (0) |
| 1968–1982 | Guiseley | | |
- Salts
- Bradford (Park Avenue)
| Total | | 21+ | (0+) |
- * Club domestic league appearances and goals

Philip Douglas Barlow (19 December 1946 – December 2019) was an English professional footballer who played as a half back.

== Career ==
Born in Shipley, Barlow played for Guiseley, Bradford City and Lincoln City. For Bradford City, he made 16 appearances in the Football League. For Lincoln City, he made 5 appearances in the Football League; he also made 1 Cup appearance. At Guiseley he played between 1968 and 1982. He also played for Salts and Bradford (Park Avenue).

His death was announced in December 2019.

== Sources ==
- Frost, Terry (1988). Bradford City A Complete Record 1903-1988. Breedon Books Sport. ISBN 0-907969-38-0.
