= Worsham =

Worsham may refer to:

- Worsham, Oxfordshire, England
- Worsham, Virginia, US
- Worsham (surname)
