= Ronald Patrick (footballer) =

English footballer

Personal information
- Position: Outside right

Senior career*
Years	Team	Apps	(Gls)
- Salts
1938–1939	Bradford City	1	(0)
Total		1	(0)
- * Club domestic league appearances and goals

Ronald Patrick was an English professional footballer who played as an outside right.

== Career ==
Pashley began his career with Salts, before joining Bradford City in 1938. He made 1 league appearance for the club, before being released in 1939.

== Sources ==
- Frost, Terry (1988). Bradford City A Complete Record 1903-1988. Breedon Books Sport. ISBN 0-907969-38-0.
