= Willie Gould =

English footballer

Personal information
- Full name: William Gould
- Date of birth: 1886
- Place of birth: Burton, England
- Positions: Midfielder; forward

Senior career*
Years	Team	Apps	(Gls)
- Glossop
1908–1909	Bradford City	18	(2)
1909–1910	Manchester City	8	(2)
Total		26	(4)
- * Club domestic league appearances and goals

William Gould (born 1886) was an English professional footballer who played as a midfielder and forward.

== Career ==
Born in Burton, Gould played for Glossop, Bradford City and Manchester City.

For Bradford City he made 18 appearances in the Football League.

For Manchester City he made 8 appearances in the Football League.

== Sources ==
- Frost, Terry (1988). Bradford City A Complete Record 1903-1988. Breedon Books Sport. ISBN 0-907969-38-0.
