= Edward Wilby =

English footballer (1922–1998)

Personal information
- Full name: Edward Wilby
- Date of birth: 18 May 1922
- Place of birth: Rotherham, England
- Date of death: February 1998 (aged 75)
- Place of death: Halifax, England
- Position: Full back

Youth career
- Wolverhampton Wanderers

Senior career*
Years	Team	Apps	(Gls)
1946–1947	Bradford City	3	(0)
- * Club domestic league appearances and goals

Edward Wilby (18 May 1922 – February 1998) was an English professional footballer who played as a full back.

== Career ==
Born in Rotherham, Wilby signed for Bradford City from Wolverhampton Wanderers in September 1946. He made 3 league appearances for the club, before being released in 1947.

== Sources ==
- Frost, Terry (1988). Bradford City A Complete Record 1903-1988. Breedon Books Sport. ISBN 0-907969-38-0.
