= Peter Newlove =

English footballer

Personal information
- Date of birth: 27 December 1947 (age 78)
- Place of birth: Bradford, England
- Position: Right half

Youth career
- 1963–1966: Bradford City

Senior career*
Years	Team	Apps	(Gls)
1966–1967	Bradford City	3	(0)
- * Club domestic league appearances and goals

Peter Newlove (born 27 December 1947) is an English former professional footballer who played as a right half.

== Career ==
Born in Bradford, Newlove joined Bradford City as an apprentice in 1963. He joined the senior team in January 1966, making 3 league appearances for the club He was released by the club in 1967.

== Sources ==
- Frost, Terry (1988). Bradford City A Complete Record 1903-1988. Breedon Books Sport. ISBN 0-907969-38-0.
