= Peter Turbitt =

English footballer

Personal information
- Full name: Peter Turbitt
- Date of birth: 1 July 1951 (age 75)
- Place of birth: Keighley, England
- Position: Right winger

Youth career
- Steeton
- Keighley Central

Senior career*
| Years | Team | Apps | (Gls) |
| 1969–1971 | Bradford City | 8 | (0) |
| Total | | 8 | (0) |
- * Club domestic league appearances and goals

Peter Turbitt (born 1 July 1951) is an English former professional footballer who played as a right winger.

== Career ==
Born in Keighley, Turbitt spent his early career with Steeton and Keighley Central. He signed for Bradford City in July 1969, and made 8 league appearances for the club, before being released in 1971.

== Sources ==
- Frost, Terry (1988). Bradford City A Complete Record 1903-1988. Breedon Books Sport. ISBN 0-907969-38-0.
