= Arthur Bancroft =

English footballer

Personal information
- Date of birth: 10 July 1903
- Place of birth: Darlington, England
- Date of death: 1984 (aged 80–81)
- Position: Centre half

Senior career*
Years	Team	Apps	(Gls)
- Tow Law Town
1926–1928	Bradford City	30	(1)
- Aldershot
- * Club domestic league appearances and goals

Arthur Bancroft (10 July 1903 – 1984) was an English professional footballer who played as a centre half.

== Career ==
Born in Darlington, Bancroft played for Tow Law Town, Bradford City and Aldershot. For Bradford City, he made 30 appearances in the Football League.

== Sources ==
- Frost, Terry (1988). Bradford City A Complete Record 1903-1988. Breedon Books Sport. ISBN 0-907969-38-0.
