= Ernest Heath =

English footballer

Personal information
- Place of birth: Rotherham, England
- Height: 5 ft 11 in (1.80 m)
- Position: Goalkeeper

Senior career*
Years	Team	Apps	(Gls)
- Gainsborough Trinity
1914–1921	Bradford City	3	(0)
- Bury
- * Club domestic league appearances and goals

Ernest C. Heath was an English professional footballer who played as a goalkeeper.

== Career ==
Born in Rotherham, Heath played for Gainsborough Trinity, Bradford City and Bury.

For Bradford City he made 3 appearances in the Football League.

== Sources ==
- Frost, Terry (1988). Bradford City A Complete Record 1903-1988. Breedon Books Sport. ISBN 0-907969-38-0.
