= Ray Robson (footballer) =

English footballer

Personal information
- Full name: Thomas Raymond Robson
- Date of birth: 11 August 1928
- Place of birth: Newcastle upon Tyne, England
- Date of death: January 2014 (aged 85)
- Place of death: Hertfordshire, England
- Position: Full back

Senior career*
Years	Team	Apps	(Gls)
1949–1950	Cardiff City	0	(0)
1950–1952	Bradford City	10	(0)
1952–1955	Grimsby Town	58	(2)
1955–195?	South Shields		
- * Club domestic league appearances and goals

Thomas Raymond Robson (11 August 1928 – January 2014) was an English professional footballer who played as a full-back. He made 68 appearances in the Football League playing for Bradford City and Grimsby Town.
