= Jeff Nundy =

English footballer

Personal information
- Full name: Jeffrey William Nundy
- Date of birth: 29 November 1935 (age 90)
- Place of birth: Hull, England
- Position: Centre half

Youth career
- Bradford City

Senior career*
Years	Team	Apps	(Gls)
1953–1957	Huddersfield Town	0	(0)
1957–1960	Bradford City	32	(0)
Total		32	(0)
- * Club domestic league appearances and goals

Jeffrey William Nundy (born 29 November 1935) is an English former professional footballer who played as a centre half.

== Career ==
Born in Hull, Nundy joined Huddersfield Town from Bradford City in December 1953. He re-joined Bradford City in July 1957, making 32 league and 2 FA Cup appearances for the club, before retiring in 1960.

== Sources ==
- Frost, Terry (1988). Bradford City A Complete Record 1903-1988. Breedon Books Sport. ISBN 0-907969-38-0.
