= Harry Travis =

English footballer

Personal information
- Full name: Henry Travis
- Date of birth: 26 December 1911
- Place of birth: Manchester, England
- Date of death: 1982 (aged 70–71)
- Height: 5 ft 10 in (1.78 m)
- Position: Centre forward

Senior career*
Years	Team	Apps	(Gls)
1931–1932	Manchester City	0	(0)
1932–1933	Oldham Athletic	0	(0)
1933–1934	Accrington Stanley	4	(1)
1934–1935	Leeds United	0	(0)
1935–1937	Bradford City	44	(20)
1937–1938	Derby County	12	(4)
1938–1939	Tranmere Rovers	13	(3)
- * Club domestic league appearances and goals

Harry Travis (26 December 1911 – 1982) was an English footballer who played as a centre forward. He was born in Manchester.

Travis had played for Leeds United before being signed on a free transfer by Dick Ray for Bradford City in June 1935. He played just two seasons at City scoring 20 league goals in 44 games, as well as three FA Cup goals in five games. One of those FA Cup games was against Derby County when the young forward impressed enough to be signed by Derby—along with Alf Jeffries—the following season.
