= Fred Warnes =

English footballer

Personal information
- Date of birth: 1915
- Place of birth: Tynemouth, England
- Height: 5 ft 9 in (1.75 m)
- Position: Defender

Senior career*
Years	Team	Apps	(Gls)
1934–1938	Bradford City	3	(1)
1938–1949	Peterborough United	120	(11)
Total		123	(12)
- * Club domestic league appearances and goals

Fred Warnes (born 1915) was an English professional footballer who played as a defender.

== Career ==
Born in Tynemouth, Warnes signed for Bradford City from 'minor football' in November 1934. He made 3 league appearances for the club, scoring 1 goal, before moving to Peterborough United in June 1938. He played with Peterborough until and including the 1948–49 season.

== Sources ==
- Frost, Terry (1988). Bradford City A Complete Record 1903-1988. Breedon Books Sport. ISBN 0-907969-38-0.
