= William Hughes (1910s footballer) =

Welsh footballer

Personal information
- Full name: William John Hughes
- Date of birth: 1889
- Place of birth: Rhyl, Wales
- Date of death: 1955 (aged 65–66)
- Position: Right half

Senior career*
Years	Team	Apps	(Gls)
- Rhyl Athletic
1908–1910	Newcastle United	1	(0)
1910	Huddersfield Town	0	(0)
- Oswestry United
- Norwich City
- Halifax Town
1914	Bradford City	1	(0)
- Barrow
- Halifax Town
- * Club domestic league appearances and goals

William John Hughes MM (1889–1955) was a Welsh professional footballer who played as a right half in the Football League for Newcastle United and Bradford City. He later served Rhyl as trainer and groundsman.

== Personal life ==
Hughes served as a corporal in the Royal Welch Fusiliers during the First World War and won the Military Medal during the course of his service.

== Career statistics ==
Appearances and goals by club, season and competition
Club	Season	League			FA Cup		Total	
Club	Season	Division	Apps	Goals	Apps	Goals	Apps	Goals
Newcastle United	1907–08	First Division	1	0	0	0	1	0
Bradford City	1913–14	First Division	1	0	0	0	1	0
Career total			2	0	0	0	2	0

== Sources ==
- Frost, Terry (1988). Bradford City A Complete Record 1903–1988. Breedon Books Sport. ISBN 0-907969-38-0.
