= Albert Wilkinson =

English footballer (1928–2011)

Personal information
- Full name: Albert Wilkinson
- Date of birth: 3 November 1928
- Place of birth: Barnsley, England
- Date of death: 26 June 2011 (aged 82)
- Place of death: Barnsley, England
- Position: Winger

Senior career*
Years	Team	Apps	(Gls)
1950–1951	Bradford City	2	(0)
1951–1952	Denaby United		
1952–1953	Halifax Town	14	(2)
1953–1954	Rotherham United	0	(0)
1954–1955	Chesterfield	0	(0)
Total		16+	(2+)
- * Club domestic league appearances and goals

Albert Wilkinson (3 November 1928 – 26 June 2011) was an English professional footballer who played as a winger.

== Career ==
Born in Barnsley, Wilkinson signed for Bradford City as an amateur in 1950. He made two league appearances for the club, before joining Denaby United in 1951. He later played for Halifax Town, Rotherham United and Chesterfield.

== Sources ==
- Frost, Terry (1988). Bradford City A Complete Record 1903-1988. Breedon Books Sport. ISBN 0-907969-38-0.
