= Alan Hebditch =

English footballer

Personal information
- Full name: Alan Hebditch
- Date of birth: 11 October 1961 (age 65)
- Place of birth: Wigan, England
- Position: Defender

Youth career
- Leeds United

Senior career*
Years	Team	Apps	(Gls)
1980–1982	Bradford City	2	(0)
- Bradley Rangers
- * Club domestic league appearances and goals

Alan Hebditch (born 11 October 1961) is an English former professional footballer who played as a defender.

== Career ==
Born in Wigan, Hebditch played for Leeds United, Bradford City and Bradley Rangers.

For Bradford City he made 2 appearances in the Football League.

== Sources ==
- Frost, Terry (1988). Bradford City A Complete Record 1903-1988. Breedon Books Sport. ISBN 0-907969-38-0.
