= Ernest Whitter =

English footballer

Personal information
- Place of birth: Didsbury, England
- Height: 5 ft 7 1/2 in (1.71 m)
- Position: Outside right

Senior career*
Years	Team	Apps	(Gls)
- Didsbury
- Nelson
1922–1924	Bradford City	1	(0)
- New Brighton
- Ashton National
- * Club domestic league appearances and goals

Ernest Whitter was an English professional footballer who played as an outside right.

== Career ==
Born in Didsbury, Whitter spent his early career with Didsbury and Nelson. He signed for Bradford City from 'minor football' in August 1922, making 1 league appearance for the club, before moving to New Brighton in July 1924. He later played for Ashton National.

== Sources ==
- Frost, Terry (1988). Bradford City A Complete Record 1903-1988. Breedon Books Sport. ISBN 0-907969-38-0.
