= Ron Liversidge =

English footballer

Personal information
- Full name: Ronnie Liversidge
- Date of birth: 12 September 1934
- Place of birth: Huddersfield, England
- Date of death: May 1997 (aged 62)
- Place of death: Huddersfield, England
- Position: Striker

Senior career*
Years	Team	Apps	(Gls)
- Ossett Town
1956–1959	Bradford City	48	(27)
- Buxton
- * Club domestic league appearances and goals

Ronnie Liversidge (12 September 1934 – May 1997) was an English professional footballer who played as a striker for Ossett Town, Bradford City and Buxton.
