= Peter Glover (footballer) =

English footballer

Personal information
- Date of birth: 16 October 1936 (age 90)
- Place of birth: Bradford, England
- Position: Right half

Senior career*
Years	Team	Apps	(Gls)
1957–1958	Bradford City	1	(0)
- * Club domestic league appearances and goals

Peter Glover (born 16 October 1936) is an English former professional footballer who played as a right half.

== Career ==
Born in Thackley, Glover played for Bradford City between November 1957 and February 1958, making 1 appearance in the English Football League.

== Sources ==
- Frost, Terry (1988). Bradford City A Complete Record 1903-1988. Breedon Books Sport. ISBN 0-907969-38-0.
