= Wallace Rea =

Scottish footballer

Personal information
- Full name: Wallace Rea
- Date of birth: 21 August 1935
- Place of birth: Uddingston, Scotland
- Date of death: May 1998 (aged 62)
- Place of death: Bradford, England
- Position: Right winger

Senior career*
Years	Team	Apps	(Gls)
- Royal Albert
1954–1956	Third Lanark	19	(2)
1956–1958	Motherwell	14	(3)
1958–1960	Bradford City	11	(2)
Total		44	(7)
- * Club domestic league appearances and goals

Wallace Rea (21 August 1935 – May 1998) was a Scottish professional footballer who played as a right winger.

== Career ==
Born in Uddingston, Rea played for Royal Albert, Third Lanark, Motherwell and Bradford City.
