= William Knox (footballer, born 1904) =

Scottish footballer

Personal information
- Date of birth: 1904
- Place of birth: Glasgow, Scotland
- Position: Half back

Senior career*
Years	Team	Apps	(Gls)
- Shettleston
1925–1927	Bradford City	11	(0)
- * Club domestic league appearances and goals

William Knox (born 1904) was a Scottish professional footballer who played as a half back.

== Career ==
Born in Glasgow, Knox signed for Bradford City in September 1925 from Shettleston, leaving the club in 1927. During his time with Bradford City he made 11 appearances in the Football League.

== Sources ==
- Frost, Terry (1988). Bradford City A Complete Record 1903-1988. Breedon Books Sport. ISBN 0-907969-38-0.
