= Henry Peart =

English footballer

Personal information
- Date of birth: 1889
- Place of birth: Newcastle, England
- Position: Centre half

Senior career*
Years	Team	Apps	(Gls)
- Strathclyde
1909–1913	Bradford City	13	(0)
1913–1915	Leeds City	7	(0)
- Blyth Spartans
Total		20	(0)
- * Club domestic league appearances and goals

Henry Peart (born 1889) was an English professional footballer who played as a centre half.

== Career ==
Born in Newcastle, Peart joined Bradford City from Strathclyde in June 1909. He made 13 league and 1 FA Cup appearances for the club, before moving to Leeds City in September 1913. He later played for Blyth Spartans.

== Sources ==
- Frost, Terry (1988). Bradford City A Complete Record 1903-1988. Breedon Books Sport. ISBN 0-907969-38-0.
