= Ernest Kenworthy =

English footballer (1887–1917)

Personal information
- Full name: George Ernest Kenworthy
- Date of birth: 1887
- Place of birth: Matlock, England
- Date of death: 10 November 1917 (aged 29)
- Place of death: West Flanders, Belgium
- Position: Inside right

Senior career*
Years	Team	Apps	(Gls)
- Matlock
–1907	Manningham Recreational		
1907–1908	Bradford City	2	(1)
1907	→ Guiseley Celtic (loan)		
1907–1908	→ Guiseley Celtic (loan)		
–1909	Sutton Junction		
1909–1910	Huddersfield Town	14	(4)
- * Club domestic league appearances and goals

George Ernest Kenworthy (1887 – 10 November 1917) was an English professional footballer who played in the Football League for Bradford City as an inside right.

== Career ==
Kenworthy signed for Bradford City in April 1907 from Manningham Recreational. During his time with the club he made two appearances in the Football League, scoring once. He left Valley Parade in 1908 and signed for Midland League club Huddersfield Town in 1909, for whom he made 20 appearances and scored six goals.

== Personal life ==
Kenworthy trained to be a teacher at Peterborough Training College and eventually became headmaster of Matlock Town Schools by 1914. After enlisting in Matlock, he served as a gunner in the Royal Garrison Artillery during the First World War and was killed by a shell on the Western Front in November 1917. Kenworthy was buried in Coxyde Military Cemetery, Belgium and left a widow and a child.

== Career statistics ==
Appearances and goals by club, season and competition
Club	Season	League			FA Cup		Total	
Club	Season	Division	Apps	Goals	Apps	Goals	Apps	Goals
Bradford City	1906–07	Second Division	1	1	—		1	1
Bradford City	1907–08	Second Division	1	0	0	0	1	0
Bradford City	Total		2	1	0	0	2	1
Huddersfield Town	1909–10	Midland League	14	4	6	2	20	6
Career total			16	5	6	2	22	7

== Sources ==
- Frost, Terry (1988). Bradford City A Complete Record 1903–1988. Breedon Books Sport. ISBN 0-907969-38-0.
