= Alex Shirley =

Scottish footballer

Personal information
- Full name: Alexander Gordon Shirley
- Date of birth: 31 October 1921
- Place of birth: Milngavie, Scotland
- Date of death: 1990 (aged 68–69)
- Place of death: Northumberland, England
- Position: Winger

Senior career*
Years	Team	Apps	(Gls)
1945–1946	Dundee United	0	(0)
1946–1947	New Brighton	18	(3)
1947–1948	Bradford City	1	(0)
1948	Mansfield Town		
1948	Ashton United		
Total		19	(3)
- * Club domestic league appearances and goals

Alexander Gordon Shirley (31 October 1921 – April 1990) was a Scottish professional footballer who played as a winger.

== Career ==
Born in Milngavie, Shirley played for Dundee United, New Brighton, Bradford City, Mansfield Town and Ashton United.
