= John Burckitt =

English footballer (1946–1999)

Personal information
- Date of birth: 16 December 1946
- Place of birth: Coventry, England
- Date of death: 1999 (aged 52)
- Position: Left back

Senior career*
Years	Team	Apps	(Gls)
1964–1968	Coventry City	5	(0)
1967	→ Bradford City (loan)	9	(0)
1968–19??	Walsall	0	(0)
19??–1970	Rugby Town		
1970–1971	Nuneaton Borough		
- * Club domestic league appearances and goals

John D. Burckitt (16 December 1946 – 1999) was an English professional footballer who played as a left back.

== Career ==
Born in Coventry, Burckitt played for Coventry, Bradford City and Walsall.

Burckitt made his debut for Coventry in October 1964, and made seven appearances for the club, five in the Second Division and two in the League Cup. While with Coventry, he played for the England youth team that reached the final of the 1965 European Youth Championships.

His final appearance for Coventry was in September 1966 in a League Cup tie against Derby County. He joined Bradford City on loan from Coventry City, and was with the club from March to July 1967. He made nine appearances in the Football League for the club.

Burckitt left Coventry in the 1968 close season for Walsall, but never appeared for their first team, and went on to play non-league football for Rugby Town and Nuneaton Borough.

He died in late 1999 at the age of 52.

== Sources ==
- Frost, Terry (1988). Bradford City A Complete Record 1903–1988. Breedon Books Sport. ISBN 0-907969-38-0.
