= William Spence (footballer) =

English footballer

Personal information
- Position: Centre forward

Senior career*
Years	Team	Apps	(Gls)
- Throckley Welfare
1927–1928	Bradford City	2	(1)
- West Stanley
Total		2	(1)
- * Club domestic league appearances and goals

William Spence was an English professional footballer who played as a centre forward.

== Career ==
Spence moved from Throckley Welfare to Bradford City in May 1927. He made 2 league appearances for the club, scoring once, before signing for West Stanley in December 1928.

== Sources ==
- Frost, Terry (1988). Bradford City A Complete Record 1903–1988. Breedon Books Sport. ISBN 0-907969-38-0.
