= Roy Baker (footballer) =

English footballer

Personal information
- Full name: Roy Vincent Baker
- Date of birth: 8 June 1954 (age 72)
- Place of birth: Bradford, England
- Position: Striker

Senior career*
Years	Team	Apps	(Gls)
1972–1975	Bradford City	46	(11)
- Guiseley
- Thackley
- Bradford (Park Avenue)
- Bridlington Town
- Farsley Celtic
- * Club domestic league appearances and goals

Roy Vincent Baker (born 8 June 1954) is an English former professional footballer who played as a striker.

== Career ==
Born in Bradford in 1954, Baker played for Eccleshill United, Bradford City, Guiseley, Thackley, Bradford (Park Avenue), Bridlington Town and Farsley Celtic. He played 46 games in the Football League for Bradford City, scoring 11 times.

== Sources ==
- Frost, Terry (1988). Bradford City A Complete Record 1903–1988. Breedon Books Sport. ISBN 0-907969-38-0.
