= Worsham (surname) =

Worsham is a surname. Notable people with the surname include:

- Charlie Worsham (born 1985), American country music singer and songwriter
- Del Worsham (born 1970), American NHRA Funny car driver
- Lauren Worsham (born 1982), American actress and singer
- Lew Worsham (1917–1990), American golfer
- William Worsham, American politician
