= Simon McGovern =

English footballer

Personal information
- Date of birth: 25 February 1965 (age 61)
- Place of birth: Bradford, England
- Position: Midfielder

Youth career
- 1979–1982: Bradford City

Senior career*
Years	Team	Apps	(Gls)
1982–1984	Bradford City	1	(0)
- Phoenix Park
- Farsley Celtic
- * Club domestic league appearances and goals

Simon McGovern (born 25 February 1965) is an English former professional footballer who played as a midfielder.

== Career ==
Born in Bradford, McGovern joined Bradford City in 1979. He joined the first-team in August 1982, making one league appearance for the club. He left the club in March 1984 to play for Phoenix Park, and he also played for Farsley Celtic.

== Sources ==
- Frost, Terry (1988). Bradford City A Complete Record 1903-1988. Breedon Books Sport. ISBN 0-907969-38-0.
