= Joseph McGrae =

English footballer

Joseph Russell McGrae (24 October 1903 – 19 November 1975) was a professional footballer.

McGrae, a defender, began his career with Everton before playing for Tranmere Rovers, Norwich City, Bradford City, Clapton Orient, and Halifax Town.

While with Norwich, McGrae made 124 appearances and scored three goals.
