= William Sarvis =

Welsh footballer

Personal information
- Full name: William Isaac Sarvis
- Date of birth: July 1898
- Place of birth: Merthyr Tydfil, Wales
- Date of death: 22 March 1968 (aged 69)
- Position: Inside right

Senior career*
Years	Team	Apps	(Gls)
- Aberdare Athletic
1921–1922	Merthyr Town	5	(1)
1922–1925	Manchester United	1	(0)
1925	Bradford City	1	(0)
1926–1927	Walsall	9	(2)
- * Club domestic league appearances and goals

William Isaac Sarvis (July 1898 – 22 March 1968) was a Welsh footballer. His regular position was as a forward. He was born in Merthyr Tydfil. He played for Aberdare Athletic, Merthyr Town, Manchester United, Bradford City and Walsall.
