= William Clarke (footballer, born 1909) =

English footballer

Personal information
- Full name: William A. Clarke
- Date of birth: 1909
- Place of birth: Manchester, England
- Position: Centre forward

Senior career*
Years	Team	Apps	(Gls)
- Hyde United
1928	Bradford City	1	(0)
- Morecambe
- * Club domestic league appearances and goals

William A. Clarke (born 1909) was an English professional footballer who played as a centre forward.

== Career ==
Born in Manchester, Clarke played for Hyde United, Bradford City and Morecambe. For Bradford City he made a single appearance in the Football League in 1928.

== Sources ==
- Frost, Terry (1988). Bradford City A Complete Record 1903-1988. Breedon Books Sport. ISBN 0-907969-38-0.
