= Cyril Hardcastle =

English footballer

Personal information
- Full name: Cyril Hardcastle
- Date of birth: 22 November 1919
- Place of birth: Halifax, England
- Date of death: 13 July 1982 (aged 62)
- Place of death: Halifax, England
- Position: Centre forward

Senior career*
Years	Team	Apps	(Gls)
- Pateley Bridge
1948–1949	Bradford City	4	(1)
- * Club domestic league appearances and goals

Cyril Hardcastle (22 November 1919 – 13 July 1982) was an English footballer who played as a centre forward.

== Career ==
Born in Halifax, Hardcastle played for Pateley Bridge and Bradford City.

For Bradford City he made 4 appearances in the Football League.

== Sources ==
- Frost, Terry (1988). Bradford City A Complete Record 1903–1988. Breedon Books Sport. ISBN 0-907969-38-0.
