= John McMorran =

Scottish footballer

Personal information
- Date of birth: 11 May 1934
- Place of birth: Forth, Scotland
- Date of death: 10 January 2001 (aged 66)
- Place of death: Biggar, Scotland
- Position: Inside right

Senior career*
Years	Team	Apps	(Gls)
- Forth Wanderers
1954–1955	Bradford City	1	(0)
- Guildford City
- * Club domestic league appearances and goals

John McMorran (11 May 1934 – 10 January 2001) was a Scottish professional footballer who played as an inside right.

== Career ==
Born in Forth, McMorran joined Bradford City from Forth Wanderers in December 1954. He made 1 league appearance for the club. He was released by the club in 1955, and later played for Guildford City.

== Sources ==
- Frost, Terry (1988). Bradford City A Complete Record 1903-1988. Breedon Books Sport. ISBN 0-907969-38-0.
