= Frank McIlwraith =

Scottish footballer

Personal information
- Date of birth: 1892
- Position: Left back

Senior career*
Years	Team	Apps	(Gls)
- Ardeer Thistle
1912–1913	Bradford City	5	(0)
- * Club domestic league appearances and goals

Frank McIlwraith (born 1892) was a Scottish professional footballer who played as a left back.

== Career ==
McIlwraith joined Bradford City from Ardeer Thistle in January 1912. He made 5 league appearances for the club. He left the club in 1913 after being released.

== Sources ==
- Frost, Terry (1988). Bradford City A Complete Record 1903-1988. Breedon Books Sport. ISBN 0-907969-38-0.
