= Mick Walters =

English footballer

Personal information
- Full name: Michael Walters
- Date of birth: 17 November 1939 (age 86)
- Place of birth: Banbury, England
- Position: Wing half

Youth career
- Coventry City

Senior career*
| Years | Team | Apps | (Gls) |
| 1956–1959 | Coventry City | 3 | (0) |
| 1959–1962 | Rugby Town | | |
| 1962–1963 | Bradford City | 19 | (0) |
| 1963–1965 | Burton Albion | | |
- Rugby Town
| Total | | 22+ | (0+) |
- * Club domestic league appearances and goals

Michael Walters (born 17 November 1939) is an English former professional footballer who played as a wing half.

== Career ==
Born in Banbury, Walters spent his early career with Coventry City and Rugby Town. He signed for Bradford City from Rugby Town in January 1962. He made 19 league and 1 FA Cup appearances for the club, before moving to Burton Albion in June 1963. He spent two seasons at Burton before returning to Rugby Town. He later became a youth coach at Banbury United.

By 2010 he was living in Oxfordshire.

== Sources ==
- Frost, Terry (1988). Bradford City A Complete Record 1903–1988. Breedon Books Sport. ISBN 0-907969-38-0.
