= Andrew Easton =

Scottish footballer

Personal information
- Date of birth: 14 March 1877
- Position: Right back

Senior career*
Years	Team	Apps	(Gls)
- Leith Athletic
- Airdrieonians
1901–1902	Hearts	3	(0)
- Millwall Athletic
1904–1905	Rangers	9	(0)
1905–1906	Bradford City	14	(0)
Total		26+	(0+)
- * Club domestic league appearances and goals

Andrew Easton (born 14 March 1877) was a Scottish professional footballer who played as a right back.

== Career ==
Easton played for Leith Athletic, Airdrieonians, Hearts, Millwall Athletic, Rangers and Bradford City.

For Bradford City he made 14 appearances in the Football League.

== Sources ==
- Frost, Terry (1988). Bradford City A Complete Record 1903-1988. Breedon Books Sport. ISBN 0-907969-38-0.
