= Harry Keggans =

Scottish association football player

Personal information
- Full name: Henry Keggans
- Date of birth: 4 December 1887
- Place of birth: Cambuslang, Scotland
- Date of death: 20 August 1949 (aged 61)
- Place of death: Sanquhar, Scotland
- Position: Inside right

Senior career*
Years	Team	Apps	(Gls)
- Sanquhar
1911–1912	Bradford City	1	(0)
- Cardiff City
- * Club domestic league appearances and goals

Harry Keggans (4 December 1887 – 20 August 1949) was a Scottish professional footballer who played as an inside right.

Keggans was born in Cambuslang, Lanarkshire to Henry Keggans and Elizabeth McSephney Keggans, and moved to New Cumnock, Ayrshire shortly afterward. Keggans signed for Bradford City in October 1911 from Sanquhar, leaving the club in August 1912 to play for Cardiff City. During his time with Bradford City he made one appearance in the Football League.

He died of coronary thrombosis in 1949.

== Sources ==
- Frost, Terry (1988). Bradford City A Complete Record 1903-1988. Breedon Books Sport. ISBN 0-907969-38-0.
