= Thomas Pashley =

English footballer

Personal information
- Position: Goalkeeper

Senior career*
Years	Team	Apps	(Gls)
- Whitby Town
1905	Bradford City	1	(0)
Total		1	(0)
- * Club domestic league appearances and goals

Thomas Pashley was an English professional footballer who played as a goalkeeper.

== Career ==
Pashley joined Bradford City from Whitby Town in February 1905. He made one league appearance for the club, before being released later in 1905.

== Sources ==
- Frost, Terry (1988). Bradford City A Complete Record 1903-1988. Breedon Books Sport. ISBN 0-907969-38-0.
