= Thomas Mulloy =

English footballer

Personal information
- Position: Outside right

Senior career*
Years	Team	Apps	(Gls)
- Barnoldswick Town
1923–1924	Bradford City	2	(0)
- Morecambe
- * Club domestic league appearances and goals

Thomas Mulloy was an English professional footballer who played as an outside right.

== Career ==
Mulloy joined Bradford City from Barnoldswick Town in August 1923. He made 2 league appearances for the club. He left the club in July 1924 to play for Morecambe.

== Sources ==
- Frost, Terry (1988). Bradford City A Complete Record 1903-1988. Breedon Books Sport. ISBN 0-907969-38-0.
