= Allan Devanney =

English footballer

Personal information
- Date of birth: 20 September 1941
- Place of birth: Otley, England
- Date of death: 1992 (aged 50–51)
- Position: Striker

Senior career*
Years	Team	Apps	(Gls)
1959–1962	Bradford City	14	(2)
- Guiseley
Total		14	(2)
- * Club domestic league appearances and goals

Allan Devanney (5 September 1941 – 1992) was an English professional footballer who played as a striker.

== Career ==
Born in Otley, Devanney played for Bradford City and Guiseley.
