= Ray Tong =

English footballer

Personal information
- Full name: Raymond Tong
- Date of birth: 3 February 1942 (age 84)
- Place of birth: Bolton, England
- Position: Left winger

Youth career
- Little Lever
- Bury

Senior career*
Years	Team	Apps	(Gls)
1962–1963	Blackburn Rovers	0	(0)
1963–1965	Bradford City	20	(2)
Total		20	(2)
- * Club domestic league appearances and goals

Raymond Tong (born 3 February 1942) is an English former professional footballer who played as a left winger.

== Career ==
Born in Bolton, Tong spent his early career with Bury, Blackburn Rovers and Bradford City. He signed for Bradford City in June 1963, and made 20 league and 1 Football League Cup appearances for the club, before retiring in 1965.

== Sources ==
- Frost, Terry (1988). Bradford City A Complete Record 1903-1988. Breedon Books Sport. ISBN 0-907969-38-0.
