= William Wilson (footballer, born 1915) =

English footballer

Personal information
- Date of birth: 1915
- Place of birth: Sheffield, England
- Position: Right half

Senior career*
Years	Team	Apps	(Gls)
- Lopham Street WMC
1934–1939	Bradford City	1	(0)
- Newark Town
- * Club domestic league appearances and goals

William Wilson (born 1915) was an English professional footballer who played as a right half.

== Career ==
Born in Sheffield, Wilson played for Lopham Street WMC, Bradford City and Newark Town. For Bradford City, he made 1 appearance in the Football League.

== Sources ==
- Frost, Terry (1988). Bradford City A Complete Record 1903-1988. Breedon Books Sport. ISBN 0-907969-38-0.
