= Ron Bayliss =

Northern Irish footballer

Personal information
- Full name: Ronald Bayliss
- Date of birth: 20 September 1944 (age 82)
- Place of birth: Belfast, Northern Ireland
- Position: Defender

Youth career
- Reading

Senior career*
Years	Team	Apps	(Gls)
1964–1968	Reading	38	(1)
1968–1970	Bradford City	39	(0)
- Yeovil Town
Total		77	(1)
- * Club domestic league appearances and goals

Ronald Bayliss (born 20 September 1944) is a Northern Irish former professional footballer who played as a defender.

== Career ==
After playing with their youth team, Bayliss spent four seasons with the senior team of Reading, making 38 appearances in the Football League. After leaving Reading, Bayliss spent two seasons with Bradford City, before dropping into non-league football with Yeovil Town.
