= Arthur Rutter =

English footballer

Personal information
- Date of birth: 1887
- Place of birth: South Shields, England
- Position: Forward

Senior career*
Years	Team	Apps	(Gls)
- South Shields Parkside
1909–1910	Bradford City	3	(0)
1910	South Shields		
1910–1911	Barnsley	16	(5)
1911–1913	Exeter City	64	(19)
1913–1918	Plymouth Argyle	19	(7)
Total		102+	(31+)
- * Club domestic league appearances and goals

Arthur Rutter (1887 – after 1917) was an English professional footballer who played as a forward.

== Career ==
Born in South Shields, Rutter began his career with South Shields Parkside. He joined Bradford City in October 1909, making 3 league appearances for the club. He was released in 1910, and later played for South Shields, Barnsley, Exeter City and Plymouth Argyle. At Plymouth he scored 7 goals in 19 league games. He remained contracted with Plymouth until the end of the First World War, though when that conflict ended he chose to stay in the Royal Naval Auxiliary Service.

== Sources ==
- Frost, Terry (1988). Bradford City A Complete Record 1903-1988. Breedon Books Sport. ISBN 0-907969-38-0.
