= William Wass =

English footballer

Personal information
- Date of birth: 16 November 1922
- Place of birth: Ryhope, England
- Date of death: October 2009 (aged 86)
- Place of death: Sunderland, England
- Position: Right winger

Senior career*
Years	Team	Apps	(Gls)
- Murton Colliery Welfare
1945–1946	Middlesbrough	0	(0)
1946–1947	Bradford City	7	(1)
Total		7	(1)
- * Club domestic league appearances and goals

William Wass (16 November 1922 – October 2009) was an English professional footballer who played as a right winger.

== Career ==
Born in Ryhope, Wass spent his early career with Murton Colliery Welfare and Middlesbrough. He signed for Bradford City from Middlesbrough in July 1946. He made 7 league appearances for the club, scoring 1 goal, before being released in 1947.

== Sources ==
- Frost, Terry (1988). Bradford City A Complete Record 1903-1988. Breedon Books Sport. ISBN 0-907969-38-0.
