= Fred Haughey =

English footballer

Personal information
- Date of birth: 12 May 1921
- Place of birth: Conisbrough, England
- Date of death: 30 October 2011 (aged 90)
- Position: Left back

Youth career
- Halifax Town

Senior career*
Years	Team	Apps	(Gls)
	Halifax Town	0	(0)
1946–1947	Bradford City	3	(0)
Total		3	(0)
- * Club domestic league appearances and goals

Fred Haughey (12 May 1921 – 30 October 2011) was an English professional footballer who played as a left back.

== Career ==
Born in Conisbrough, Haughey played for Halifax Town and Bradford City.

For Bradford City he made 3 appearances in the Football League.

== Sources ==
- Frost, Terry (1988). Bradford City A Complete Record 1903-1988. Breedon Books Sport. ISBN 0-907969-38-0.
