= David Roper (footballer) =

English footballer

Personal information
- Full name: David Roper
- Date of birth: 26 September 1944
- Place of birth: Ilkley, England
- Date of death: November 2005 (aged 61)
- Place of death: Leeds, England
- Position: Goalkeeper

Senior career*
Years	Team	Apps	(Gls)
- Salts
1962–1963	Bradford City	13	(0)

International career
- England Youth
- * Club domestic league appearances and goals

David Roper (26 September 1944 – November 2005) was an English professional footballer who played as a goalkeeper.

== Career ==
Born in Ilkley, Roper joined Bradford City from Salts in September 1962. He made making 13 league and 3 FA Cup appearances for the club, before leaving in 1963.

He was also an England Youth international.

== Sources ==
- Frost, Terry (1988). Bradford City A Complete Record 1903-1988. Breedon Books Sport. ISBN 0-907969-38-0.
