= George Mordue =

English footballer

Personal information
- Full name: George Anthony Mordue
- Date of birth: 3 November 1915
- Place of birth: South Shields, England
- Date of death: 28 August 1999 (aged 83)
- Place of death: Sunderland, Tyne and Wear, England
- Height: 6 ft 0 in (1.83 m)
- Position: Right half

Senior career*
| Years | Team | Apps | (Gls) |
- Washington Colliery
- Wolverhampton Wanderers
- Bournemouth and Boscombe Athletic
- Aldershot
| 1938–1939 | Bradford City | 7 | (0) |
- * Club domestic league appearances and goals

George Anthony Mordue (3 November 1915 – 28 August 1999) was an English professional footballer who played as a right half.

== Career ==
Born in South Shields, Mordue spent his early career with Washington Colliery, Wolverhampton Wanderers, Bournemouth and Boscombe Athletic and Aldershot. He joined Bradford City in October 1938, making 7 league appearances, before being released by the club in 1939.

== Sources ==
- Frost, Terry (1988). Bradford City A Complete Record 1903-1988. Breedon Books Sport. ISBN 0-907969-38-0.
