= Edward Joyce (footballer) =

English footballer

Personal information
- Date of birth: 1908
- Place of birth: Bradford, England
- Position: Outside right

Senior career*
Years	Team	Apps	(Gls)
- Yorkshire Amateur
1929–1930	Bradford City	1	(0)
- * Club domestic league appearances and goals

Edward Joyce (born 1908) was an English professional footballer who played as an outside right.

== Career ==
Born in Bradford, Joyce signed for Bradford City in August 1929 from Yorkshire Amateur, leaving the club in 1930. During his time with Bradford City he made one appearance in the Football League.

== Sources ==
- Frost, Terry (1988). Bradford City A Complete Record 1903-1988. Breedon Books Sport. ISBN 0-907969-38-0.
