= Ernie Schofield =

English footballer

Personal information
- Full name: Ernest Schofield
- Date of birth: 29 March 1921
- Place of birth: Sheffield, England
- Position: Inside forward

Senior career*
Years	Team	Apps	(Gls)
	Sheffield Wednesday	0	(0)
1945–1947	Bradford City	1	(1)
Total		1	(1)
- * Club domestic league appearances and goals

Ernest Schofield (Note: Surname is also spelt as 'Scholfield'.) (born 29 March 1921) was an English professional footballer who played as an inside forward.

== Career ==
Born in Sheffield, Schofield moved from Sheffield Wednesday to Bradford City in June 1945. He scored 1 goal in 1 league appearance for the club, and made a further 2 FA Cup appearances without scoring, before being released in 1947.

== Sources ==
- Frost, Terry (1988). Bradford City A Complete Record 1903-1988. Breedon Books Sport. ISBN 0-907969-38-0.
