= Wingrove Manners =

Barbadian footballer

Personal information
- Full name: Wingrove Austin Manners
- Date of birth: 7 March 1955
- Place of birth: Barbados
- Date of death: 22 April 2014 (aged 59)
- Place of death: Leeds, England
- Position: Forward

Youth career
- Bradford City

Senior career*
Years	Team	Apps	(Gls)
1972–1973	Bradford City	1	(0)
- * Club domestic league appearances and goals

Wingrove Austin Manners (7 March 1955 – 22 April 2014) was a Barbadian professional footballer who played as a forward.

== Career ==
Manners joined Bradford City as an apprentice, moving to the first-team in January 1972. He made 1 league appearance for the club. He was released by the club in February 1973.

He later became a racketlon player, winning the Over-45s World Racketlon Tour Scottish Open title in October 2008.

== Sources ==
- Frost, Terry (1988). Bradford City A Complete Record 1903-1988. Breedon Books Sport. ISBN 0-907969-38-0.
