= Warren Rayner =

English former footballer

Personal information
- Full name: Warren Anthony Rayner
- Date of birth: 24 April 1957 (age 69)
- Place of birth: Bradford, England
- Position: Right winger

Youth career
- 1972–1975: Bradford City

Senior career*
Years	Team	Apps	(Gls)
1975–1977	Bradford City	17	(0)
- Guiseley
- Gainsborough Trinity

Managerial career
- Eccleshill United
- * Club domestic league appearances and goals

Warren Anthony Rayner (born 24 April 1957) is an English former professional footballer who played as a right winger. He later became a coach.

== Playing career ==
Born in Bradford, Rayner joined Bradford City from local amateur football in May 1972, joining the first team in April 1975. He made 17 league appearances for the club, before moving to Guiseley in 1977. He later played for Gainsborough Trinity.

== Coaching career ==
In July 2016 he was working as Head of Development Phase at the Bradford City Academy. In November 2017 he was manager of non-league Eccleshill United.

== Sources ==
- Frost, Terry (1988). Bradford City A Complete Record 1903-1988. Breedon Books Sport. ISBN 0-907969-38-0.
