= Thomas Anderson (footballer, born 1897) =

Scottish footballer

Personal information
- Date of birth: 1897
- Place of birth: Bathgate, Scotland
- Height: 5 ft 10 in (1.78 m)
- Position: Forward

Senior career*
Years	Team	Apps	(Gls)
- Bathgate
1920–1922	Bradford City	2	(0)
- * Club domestic league appearances and goals

Thomas Anderson was a Scottish professional footballer who played as a forward.

== Career ==
Anderson played for Bathgate and Bradford City. For Bradford City, he made 12 appearances in the Football League.

== Sources ==
- Frost, Terry (1988). Bradford City A Complete Record 1903-1988. Breedon Books Sport. ISBN 0-907969-38-0.
