= Jack Slemin =

Irish footballer

Personal information
- Full name: John Christopher Slemin
- Date of birth: 29 November 1881
- Place of birth: Dublin, UK
- Date of death: 1939 (aged 57)
- Place of death: Dublin, Ireland
- Position: Outside left

Senior career*
Years	Team	Apps	(Gls)
- Bohemians
1909–1910	Bradford City	3	(0)
- Distillery
Total		3	(0)

International career
1908	Ireland amateur	1	(0)
1909	Ireland	1	(0)
- * Club domestic league appearances and goals

John Christopher Slemin (29 November 1881 – 1939) was an Irish footballer who played as an outside left.

== Career ==
Slemin was born in 1881, in Dublin. He began his career as an amateur at Bohemians, whilst also working as a fitter. With Bohemian he won the Irish Cup in 1907–08, and was a runner-up in 1908–09. He was also capped by Ireland amateurs in 1908, and by Ireland in 1909.

He signed for Bradford City in May 1909, making 3 league appearances for the club, before being released in 1910.

He later played for Distillery.

He died in Dublin in 1939, aged 57.

== Sources ==
- Frost, Terry (1988). Bradford City A Complete Record 1903-1988. Breedon Books Sport. ISBN 0-907969-38-0.
