= Robert Ferguson (English footballer) =

English footballer

Personal information
- Position: Centre forward

Senior career*
Years	Team	Apps	(Gls)
1906–1907	Bradford City	9	(3)
- * Club domestic league appearances and goals

Robert Ferguson was an English professional footballer who played as a centre forward.

== Career ==
Ferguson played for Bradford City.

For Bradford City he made 9 appearances in the Football League, scoring 3 goals.

== Sources ==
- Frost, Terry (1988). Bradford City A Complete Record 1903-1988. Breedon Books Sport. ISBN 0-907969-38-0.
