= Daniel McKinney =

Irish footballer (1898–1956)

Personal information
- Full name: Daniel McKinney
- Date of birth: 9 November 1898
- Place of birth: Belfast, Ireland
- Date of death: 28 February 1956 (aged 57)
- Height: 5 ft 7 1/2 in (1.71 m)
- Position: Forward

Youth career
- St Paul's Swifts

Senior career*
| Years | Team | Apps | (Gls) |
- Belfast Celtic
| 1920–1923 | Hull City | 55 | (12) |
| 1923–1924 | Bradford City | 31 | (1) |
| 1924–1926 | Norwich City | 48 | (4) |
- Bangor
| Total | | 134 | (17) |

International career
| 1921–1924 | Ireland | 2 | (0) |
- * Club domestic league appearances and goals

Daniel McKinney (9 November 1898 – 28 February 1956), also known as Dan McKinney and Danny McKinney, was an Irish international footballer who played professionally in England as a forward.

== Career ==
Born in Belfast, McKinney began his career in his native Ireland with St Paul's Swifts and Belfast Celtic, before moving to England in 1920 to play in the Football League with Hull City, Bradford City and Norwich City. McKinney returned to Ireland to play with Bangor in 1926.

McKinney also represented Ireland at international level, earning 2 caps between 1921 and 1924.

== Personal life ==
His two brothers Jack and Malachy were also footballers.
