= Ron Rice (footballer) =

English footballer

Personal information
- Full name: Ronald Henry Rice
- Date of birth: 13 April 1923
- Place of birth: Birkenhead, England
- Date of death: 11 February 2011 (aged 87)
- Place of death: Wirral, England
- Position: Inside forward

Youth career
- Huddersfield Town

Senior career*
Years	Team	Apps	(Gls)
1946	Bradford City	1	(0)
1946–1947	Tranmere Rovers	4	(1)
Total		5	(1)
- * Club domestic league appearances and goals

Ron Rice (13 April 1923 – 11 February 2011) was an English footballer, who played as an inside forward in the Football League for Tranmere Rovers.
