= Albert Bumford =

Welsh footballer

Personal information
- Place of birth: Ton Pentre, Wales
- Position: Left half

Senior career*
Years	Team	Apps	(Gls)
- Bristol City
1930–1933	Bradford City	10	(0)
- Bangor City
- * Club domestic league appearances and goals

Albert Bumford was a Welsh professional footballer who played as a left half.

== Career ==
Born in Ton Pentre, Bumford played for Bristol City, Bradford City and Bangor City. For Bradford City, he made 10 appearances in the Football League.

== Sources ==
- Frost, Terry (1988). Bradford City A Complete Record 1903-1988. Breedon Books Sport. ISBN 0-907969-38-0.
