= Ray Parker (footballer) =

English footballer (1925–2006)

Personal information
- Date of birth: 25 January 1925
- Place of birth: Doncaster, England
- Date of death: January 2006 (aged 80)
- Place of death: Rotherham, South Yorkshire, England
- Position: Centre half

Senior career*
| Years | Team | Apps | (Gls) |
| 1947–1948 | Chesterfield | 14 | (0) |
| 1948 | Sheffield Wednesday | 1 | (0) |
- Buxton
| 1951–1953 | Bradford City | 41 | (1) |
- Kettering Town
| Total | | 56 | (1) |
- * Club domestic league appearances and goals

Ray Parker (27 January 1925 - January 2006) was an English professional footballer who played as a centre half.

== Career ==
Born in Doncaster, Parker played in the Football League for Chesterfield, Sheffield Wednesday and Bradford City. He also played non-league football for Buxton and Kettering Town.
