= Peter Miller (footballer, born 1929) =

English footballer

Personal information
- Full name: Peter Derek Miller
- Date of birth: 4 December 1929
- Place of birth: Hoyland, England
- Date of death: 17 July 2012 (aged 82)
- Place of death: Huddersfield, England
- Position: Half back

Senior career*
Years	Team	Apps	(Gls)
1952–1956	Bradford City	18	(2)
	Grimsby Town	0	(0)
- Frickley Colliery
- * Club domestic league appearances and goals

Peter Derek Miller (4 December 1929 – 17 July 2012) was an English professional footballer who played as a half back.

== Career ==
Born in Hoyland, Miller signed for Bradford City in August 1952. He made 18 league appearances for the club, scoring twice. He left the club in 1956 to sign for Grimsby Town, and also played for Frickley Colliery.

== Sources ==
- Frost, Terry (1988). Bradford City A Complete Record 1903-1988. Breedon Books Sport. ISBN 0-907969-38-0.
