= Edward Gott =

English footballer

Personal information
- Position: Goalkeeper

Senior career*
| Years | Team | Apps | (Gls) |
- Rawdon
| 1904–1906 | Bradford City | 8 | (0) |
- * Club domestic league appearances and goals

Edward Gott was an English professional footballer who played as a goalkeeper.

== Career ==
Gott played for Rawdon and Bradford City.

For Bradford City he made 8 appearances in the Football League.

== Sources ==
- Frost, Terry (1988). Bradford City A Complete Record 1903-1988. Breedon Books Sport. ISBN 0-907969-38-0.
