= Edwin Daw =

English footballer

Personal information
- Full name: Edwin C. Daw
- Position: Goalkeeper

Senior career*
Years	Team	Apps	(Gls)
- Doncaster Rovers
1905–1906	Bradford City	16	(0)
- Oldham Athletic
- * Club domestic league appearances and goals

Edwin C. Daw was an English professional footballer who played as a goalkeeper.

== Career ==
Daw played for Doncaster Rovers, Bradford City and Oldham Athletic. For Bradford City he made 16 appearances in the Football League; he also made 3 appearances in the FA Cup.

== Sources ==
- Frost, Terry (1988). Bradford City A Complete Record 1903-1988. Breedon Books Sport. ISBN 0-907969-38-0.
