= Stuart Swales =

English footballer

Personal information
- Position: Outside left

Senior career*
Years	Team	Apps	(Gls)
1937–1938	Bradford City	13	(0)
Total		13	(0)
- * Club domestic league appearances and goals

Stuart Swales was an English footballer who played as an outside left.

== Career ==
Swales signed for Bradford City as an amateur in 1937. He made 13 league and 1 FA Cup appearances for the club, before being released in 1938.

== Sources ==
- Frost, Terry (1988). Bradford City A Complete Record 1903-1988. Breedon Books Sport. ISBN 0-907969-38-0.
