= Richard Yeates =

English footballer

Personal information
- Position: Centre forward

Senior career*
Years	Team	Apps	(Gls)
1924–1925	Bradford City	3	(0)
- * Club domestic league appearances and goals

Richard Yeates was an English professional footballer who played as a centre forward.

== Career ==
Yeates signed for Bradford City from "minor football" in August 1924. He made three league appearances for the club, before being released in 1925.

== Sources ==
- Frost, Terry (1988). Bradford City A Complete Record 1903-1988. Breedon Books Sport. ISBN 0-907969-38-0.
