= Alf Carroll =

English footballer

Personal information
- Full name: Alfred Carroll
- Date of birth: 6 March 1920
- Place of birth: Bradford, England
- Date of death: November 1994 (aged 74)
- Place of death: Keighley, England
- Position: Centre half

Senior career*
Years	Team	Apps	(Gls)
- US Metallic Packing
1948–1950	Bradford City	28	(0)
- * Club domestic league appearances and goals

Alfred Carroll (6 March 1920 – November 1994) was an English professional footballer who played as a centre half.

== Career ==
Born in Bradford, Carroll played for US Metallic Packing and Bradford City. For Bradford City, he made 28 appearances in the Football League.

== Sources ==
- Frost, Terry (1988). Bradford City A Complete Record 1903-1988. Breedon Books Sport. ISBN 0-907969-38-0.
