= Steve Lampkin =

English footballer

Personal information
- Full name: Stephen Charles Arthur Lampkin
- Date of birth: 15 October 1964 (age 62)
- Place of birth: Silsden, England
- Position: Midfielder

Senior career*
Years	Team	Apps	(Gls)
- Silsden
1983–1984	Bradford City	7	(1)
- Oswestry Town
- Colne Dynamoes
- * Club domestic league appearances and goals

Stephen Charles Arthur Lampkin (born 15 October 1964) is an English former professional footballer who played as a midfielder.

== Career ==
Born in Silsden, Lampkin signed for Bradford City in March 1983 from Silsden, leaving the club in 1984 to play for Oswestry Town. During his time with Bradford City he made seven appearances in the Football League, scoring one goal. He also played for Steeton.

He later played with Colne Dynamoes, winning the FA Vase in 1988.

== Personal life ==
Lampkin runs his own engineering company in Silsden.

His cousin Dougie Lampkin is a motorcyclist.

== Sources ==
- Frost, Terry (1988). Bradford City A Complete Record 1903-1988. Breedon Books Sport. ISBN 0-907969-38-0.
