= Harry Noon =

English footballer and coach

Personal information
- Date of birth: 6 October 1937
- Place of birth: Sutton-in-Ashfield, England
- Date of death: 2 September 1996 (aged 58)
- Place of death: Sydney, Australia
- Position: Full back

Senior career*
| Years | Team | Apps | (Gls) |
- Bentinck Methodists
| 1955–1962 | Notts County | 122 | (0) |
| 1962–1963 | Bradford City | 1 | (0) |
- Wisbech Town
| Total | | 123 | (0) |

Managerial career
- 1984: Sydney Croatia
- * Club domestic league appearances and goals

Harry Noon (6 October 1937 – 2 September 1996) was an English professional football player and coach.

== Career ==
Born in Sutton-in-Ashfield, Noon played as a full back for Bentinck Methodists, Notts County, Bradford City and Wisbech Town.

He joined Bradford City in July 1962 and left them in February 1963. During his time with the club, he made one appearance in the Football League and one appearance in the FA Cup.

He later moved to Australia, where he was coach of Sydney Croatia during the 1984 season. He died in Sydney on 2 September 1996.

== Sources ==
- Frost, Terry (1988). Bradford City A Complete Record 1903-1988. Breedon Books Sport. ISBN 0-907969-38-0.
