= Sam Anderson (footballer) =

Scottish footballer (fl. 1912–1925)

Personal information
- Full name: Samuel Anderson
- Position: Inside left

Senior career*
Years	Team	Apps	(Gls)
- Shettleston
1912–1913	Hamilton Academical	31	(3)
1913–1914	South Shields		
1914–1919	Bradford City	14	(3)
1916	→ Bathgate (loan)		
1916–1918	→ Airdrieonians (loan)	57	(11)
1918–1919	→ Hamilton Academical (loan)	23	(4)
1919–1924	Third Lanark	57	(5)
1922–1923	→ St Bernard's (loan)	32	(8)
1923–1924	→ Nithsdale Wanderers (loan)	22	(3)
1924–1925	Nithsdale Wanderers	5	(2)
Total		241	(39)
- * Club domestic league appearances and goals

Samuel Anderson was a Scottish professional footballer who played as an inside left.

== Career ==
Anderson played for Hamilton Academical, Bradford City and Third Lanark. For Bradford City, he made 14 appearances in the Football League and two in the FA Cup. World War I then intervened, and Anderson was loaned back to Scottish clubs, spending two seasons with Airdrieonians and one back at Hamilton. After the conflict he returned home on a permanent basis with Third Lanark, later going out on loan again, this time to lower division teams as his career wound down.

== Sources ==
- Frost, Terry (1988). Bradford City A Complete Record 1903-1988. Breedon Books Sport. ISBN 0-907969-38-0.
