= Hubert Cockroft =

English footballer

Personal information
- Date of birth: 21 November 1918
- Place of birth: Barnsley, England
- Date of death: 1979 (aged 60–61)
- Place of death: Bradford, England
- Position: Left half

Youth career
- Barnsley

Senior career*
Years	Team	Apps	(Gls)
1946–1947	Bradford City	27	(0)
1947–1948	Halifax Town	10	(1)
1948–1950	Peterborough United	71	(2)
Total		108	(3)
- * Club domestic league appearances and goals

Hubert Cockroft (21 November 1918 – 1979) was an English professional footballer who played as a left half.

== Career ==
Born in Barnsley, Cockroft played for Barnsley, Bradford City, Halifax Town and Peterborough United.

He played for Bradford City between May 1946 and July 1947, making 27 appearances in the Football League and 3 appearances in the FA Cup for them.

== Sources ==
- Frost, Terry (1988). Bradford City A Complete Record 1903-1988. Breedon Books Sport. ISBN 0-907969-38-0.
