= William Brown (footballer, born 1912) =

Scottish footballer

Personal information
- Full name: William Walker Brown
- Date of birth: 24 June 1912
- Place of birth: Coatbridge, Scotland
- Date of death: 6 May 2008 (aged 95)
- Place of death: Corby, England
- Height: 5 ft 8 in (1.73 m)
- Position: Full back

Senior career*
Years	Team	Apps	(Gls)
1934–1935	Dunfermline Athletic	14	(0)
1935–1938	Stockport County	8	(0)
1938–1939	Bradford City	4	(0)
Total		12	(0)
- * Club domestic league appearances and goals

William Walker Brown (24 June 1912 – 6 May 2008) was a Scottish professional footballer who played as a full back.

== Career ==
Brown was born in Coatbridge, Scotland. He played in Scotland for Dunfermline Athletic and in England for Stockport County and Bradford City. For Bradford City, he made four appearances in the Football League.

== Sources ==
- Frost, Terry (1988). Bradford City A Complete Record 1903-1988. Breedon Books Sport. ISBN 0-907969-38-0.
