= William Humphreys (footballer) =

English footballer

Personal information
- Place of birth: St Helens, England
- Position: Inside right

Senior career*
Years	Team	Apps	(Gls)
1931–1932	Bradford City	1	(0)
- * Club domestic league appearances and goals

William Humphreys was an English professional footballer who played as an inside right.

== Career ==
Born in St Helens, Humphreys signed for Bradford City in September 1931 after playing minor football, leaving the club in 1932. During his time with Bradford City he made one appearance in the Football League.

== Sources ==
- Frost, Terry (1988). Bradford City A Complete Record 1903-1988. Breedon Books Sport. ISBN 0-907969-38-0.
