= Robert Brannan =

English footballer

Personal information
- Date of birth: 27 August 1924
- Place of birth: Bradford, England
- Date of death: January 1986 (aged 61)
- Place of death: Bradford, England
- Position: Winger

Senior career*
Years	Team	Apps	(Gls)
1947–1948	Bradford City	9	(2)
1948–1949	Scarborough		
1949	Bradford City	2	(0)
- Scarborough
- * Club domestic league appearances and goals

Robert Brannan (27 August 1924 – January 1986) was an English professional footballer who played as a winger.

== Career ==
Born in Bradford, Brannan played for Bradford City and Scarborough. For Bradford City, he made 11 appearances in the Football League, scoring 2 goals; he also made 1 appearance in the FA Cup. Brannon died in 1986.

== Sources ==
- Frost, Terry (1988). Bradford City A Complete Record 1903-1988. Breedon Books Sport. ISBN 0-907969-38-0.
