= Samuel Jones (footballer, born 1955) =

English footballer

Personal information
- Full name: Samuel Stephen Thomas Jones
- Date of birth: 6 September 1955 (age 71)
- Place of birth: Harrogate, England
- Position: Goalkeeper

Senior career*
Years	Team	Apps	(Gls)
1971–1975	Bradford City	2	(0)
Total		2	(0)
- * Club domestic league appearances and goals

Samuel Stephen Thomas Jones (born 6 September 1955) is an English former professional footballer who played as a goalkeeper.

== Career ==
Born in Harrogate, Jones signed for Bradford City in September 1971 after playing as an apprentice, leaving the club in July 1975 to play in the Harrogate League. During his time with Bradford City he made two appearances in the Football League.

== Sources ==
- Frost, Terry (1988). Bradford City A Complete Record 1903-1988. Breedon Books Sport. ISBN 0-907969-38-0.
