= Les Farnen =

English footballer

Personal information
- Full name: Austin Leslie Farnen
- Date of birth: 17 September 1919
- Place of birth: St Helens, England
- Date of death: January 1985 (aged 65)
- Place of death: Harrow, England
- Position: Centre half

Youth career
- Kingsbury Town

Senior career*
Years	Team	Apps	(Gls)
1946–1949	Watford	77	(0)
1949	Bradford City	8	(0)
1949–1950	Gloucester City	25	(0)
- * Club domestic league appearances and goals

Austin Leslie Farnen (17 September 1919 – January 1985) was an English professional footballer. After serving in the military during the Second World War, Farnen joined Football League Third Division South side Watford in April 1946. He played at centre half for every competitive fixture of the 1946–47 season, but then made 27 appearances in his second season, and was released after only eight appearances for Watford in 1948–49. Farnen went on to join Bradford City, making eight further appearances in the Football League. He then joined Gloucester City in the Southern Football League making 25 appearances.

He died in Harrow in January 1985, aged 65.
