= Jack Padgett =

English footballer (1916–1985)

Personal information
- Full name: John Malcolm Padgett
- Date of birth: 30 November 1916
- Place of birth: Ilkeston, England
- Date of death: 1985 (aged 68–69)
- Place of death: Doncaster, England
- Position: Outside right

Senior career*
| Years | Team | Apps | (Gls) |
- Townend Juniors
| 1937–1938 | Bradford City | 2 | (1) |
- Bradford (Park Avenue)
- Denaby United
| 1945–1947 | Peterborough United | 30 | (11) |
- Frickley Colliery
| Total | | 32 | (12) |
- * Club domestic league appearances and goals

John Malcolm Padgett (30 November 1916 – 1985) was an English professional footballer who played as an outside right.

== Career ==
Born in Ilkeston, Padgett joined Bradford City from Townend Juniors in 1937. He made 2 league appearances for the club, scoring 1 goal. He left the club in June 1938 to join Bradford (Park Avenue), and later played for Denaby United, Peterborough United and Frickley Colliery. At Peterborough he made 30 Midland League appearances, scoring 11 goals, as well as 2 goals in 9 FA Cup games.

== Sources ==
- Frost, Terry (1988). Bradford City A Complete Record 1903-1988. Breedon Books Sport. ISBN 0-907969-38-0.
