= Kevin Megson =

English footballer

Personal information
- Full name: Kevin Craig Megson
- Date of birth: 1 July 1971 (age 55)
- Place of birth: Halifax, England
- Position: Right back

Senior career*
Years	Team	Apps	(Gls)
1989–1991	Bradford City	27	(0)
1991–1994	Halifax Town	41	(1)
1994–1996	Stalybridge Celtic	54	(3)
- Ovenden West Riding
Total		122	(4)
- * Club domestic league appearances and goals

Kevin Craig Megson (born 1 July 1971) is an English former professional footballer who played as a right back.

== Career ==
Born in Halifax, Megson played for Bradford City, Halifax Town and Stalybridge Celtic. He later captained Ovenden West Riding.
