= Robert McAlea =

Northern Irish footballer

Personal information
- Full name: Robert Joseph McAlea
- Date of birth: 13 September 1920
- Place of birth: Belfast, Ireland
- Date of death: 21 February 2009 (aged 88)
- Place of death: Belfast, Northern Ireland
- Position: Inside forward

Senior career*
Years	Team	Apps	(Gls)
- Ballymoney United
1948–1949	Bradford City	4	(2)
- * Club domestic league appearances and goals

Robert Joseph McAlea (13 September 1920 – 21 February 2009), known as Bert McAlea, was a Northern Irish professional footballer who played as an inside forward.

== Career ==
Born in Belfast, McAlea joined Bradford City from Ballymoney United in May 1948. He made four league appearances for the club. He was released by the club in September 1949.

== Sources ==
- Frost, Terry (1988). Bradford City A Complete Record 1903-1988. Breedon Books Sport. ISBN 0-907969-38-0.
