= Thomas Pickard (footballer) =

English footballer

Personal information
- Full name: Thomas James Pickard
- Date of birth: 4 June 1911
- Place of birth: Amble, England
- Date of death: 1967 (aged 55–56)
- Height: 5 ft 10 1/2 in (1.79 m)
- Position: Goalkeeper

Senior career*
Years	Team	Apps	(Gls)
- Amble
1929–1930	Sunderland	0	(0)
1930–1931	Gateshead	17	(0)
1931–1932	Bradford City	6	(0)
1932–1937	Barrow	174	(0)
Total		197	(0)
- * Club domestic league appearances and goals

Thomas James Pickard (4 June 1911 – 1967) was an English professional footballer who played as a goalkeeper.

== Career ==
Born in Amble, Pickard played for his home-town club before joining Sunderland and then Gateshead, where he made 17 appearances in the 1930–31 Football League season. He joined Bradford City in September 1931, making 6 league appearances for the club, before moving to Barrow in August 1932. He made 174 league appearances for Barrow over five seasons.

He was capped for England schoolboys in 1925.

== Sources ==
- Frost, Terry (1988). Bradford City A Complete Record 1903-1988. Breedon Books Sport. ISBN 0-907969-38-0.
