= Wayne Scargill =

English footballer (born 1968)

Personal information
- Date of birth: 30 April 1968 (age 58)
- Place of birth: Barnsley, England
- Position: Full back

Senior career*
Years	Team	Apps	(Gls)
- Frickley Athletic
1993–1994	Bradford City	1	(0)
- Emley
- * Club domestic league appearances and goals

Wayne Scargill (born 30 April 1968) is an English former professional footballer who played as a full back.

== Career ==
Born in Barnsley, Scargill played for Frickley Athletic, Bradford City and Emley.

== Personal life ==
He was the nephew of Arthur Scargill.
