= Sydney Thompson (footballer) =

English footballer

Personal information
- Date of birth: 1892
- Position: Centre half

Senior career*
Years	Team	Apps	(Gls)
- Wallsend Park Villa
1911–1912	Bradford City	1	(0)
- Luton Town
- Pontypridd
Total		1	(0)
- * Club domestic league appearances and goals

Sydney Thompson (born 1892) was an English footballer who played as a centre half.

== Career ==
Thompson began his career at Wallsend Park Villa. He joined Bradford City in March 1911, making 1 league appearance for the club, before moving to Luton Town in July 1912. He later played for Pontypridd.

== Sources ==
- Frost, Terry (1988). Bradford City A Complete Record 1903-1988. Breedon Books Sport. ISBN 0-907969-38-0.
