= Tommy McQuaid =

Irish association footballer

Personal information
- Full name: Thomas Joseph McQuaid
- Date of birth: 1 February 1936
- Place of birth: Dublin, Ireland
- Date of death: 1981 (aged 44–45)
- Place of death: Bradford, England
- Position: Wing half

Senior career*
Years	Team	Apps	(Gls)
- Thackley
1957–1960	Bradford City	23	(2)
- Worksop Town
Total		23	(2)
- * Club domestic league appearances and goals

Thomas Joseph McQuaid (1 February 1936 – 1981) was an Irish professional footballer who played as a wing half.

== Career ==
Born in Dublin, McQuaid played for Thackley, Bradford City and Worksop Town.
