= Joseph Urwin =

English footballer

Personal information
- Date of birth: 25 February 1909
- Place of birth: High Spen, England
- Date of death: Q1 1976 (aged 66–67)
- Position: Outside right

Senior career*
Years	Team	Apps	(Gls)
- Tanfield Lea Institute
1930–1931	Bradford City	1	(0)
	Chesterfield	0	(0)
- Throckley Welfare
1933–1934	Lincoln City	8	(1)
- Stockport County
Total		9+	(1+)
- * Club domestic league appearances and goals

Joseph Sidney Urwin (25 February 1909 – Q1 1976) was an English professional footballer who played as an outside right.

== Career ==
Born in High Spen, Urwin moved from Tanfield Lea Institute to Bradford City in September 1930. He made 1 league and 1 FA Cup appearance for the club, before moving to Chesterfield in June 1931. He later played for Throckley Welfare, Lincoln City and Stockport County. At Lincoln he made 8 league appearances between December 1933 and July 1934.

== Sources ==
- Frost, Terry (1988). Bradford City A Complete Record 1903-1988. Breedon Books Sport. ISBN 0-907969-38-0.
