= Chris Stabb =

English footballer

Personal information
- Date of birth: 12 October 1976 (age 50)
- Place of birth: Bradford, England
- Height: 5 ft 8 in (1.73 m)
- Position: Defender

Team information
- Current team: Bradford Park Avenue

Youth career
- Bradford City

Senior career*
Years	Team	Apps	(Gls)
	Bradford City	1	(0)
1997–1998	Farsley Celtic		
1998–2002	Ossett Town		
2002–2008	Farsley Celtic		
2008–	Bradford Park Avenue		
- * Club domestic league appearances and goals

Christopher Stabb (born 12 October 1976) is an English footballer, who plays for Bradford Park Avenue.

== Career ==
Born in Bradford, Chris Stabb began his footballing career in the Bradford City academy. In 1997, he moved to neighbours Farsley Celtic but joined Ossett Town in 1998. He re-joined Farsley Celtic in 2002 where he has played ever since.

He was the club's captain for a few years before fellow defender Carl Serrant took the armband. Stabb experienced the club's rise up the leagues featuring three promotions in four years. He missed the club's 2007–08 season in the Conference National due to a knee injury which threatened his future in football. Stabb made his return to the team on 14 September in a friendly against Sheffield United.
