= Derek Montgomery =

English footballer

Personal information
- Date of birth: 5 May 1950 (age 76)
- Place of birth: Houghton-le-Spring, England
- Position: Midfielder

Senior career*
Years	Team	Apps	(Gls)
1967–1968	Leeds United	0	(0)
1968–1969	Bradford City	4	(0)
- Bedford Town
- * Club domestic league appearances and goals

Derek Montgomery (born 5 May 1950) is an English former professional footballer who played as a midfielder.

== Career ==
Born in Houghton-le-Spring, Montgomery joined Bradford City from Leeds United in July 1968. He made 4 league appearances for the club. He was released by the club in 1969, and later also played for Bedford Town.

== Sources ==
- Frost, Terry (1988). Bradford City A Complete Record 1903-1988. Breedon Books Sport. ISBN 0-907969-38-0.
