= George Gane =

English footballer

Personal information
- Position: Full back

Senior career*
Years	Team	Apps	(Gls)
- Workington
1911–1914	Bradford City	35	(0)
- Airdrieonians
- * Club domestic league appearances and goals

George Gane was an English professional footballer who played as a full back.

== Career ==
Gane played for Workington, Bradford City and Airdrieonians.

For Bradford City he made 35 appearances in the Football League; he also made 4 appearances in the FA Cup.

== Sources ==
- Frost, Terry (1988). Bradford City A Complete Record 1903-1988. Breedon Books Sport. ISBN 0-907969-38-0.
