= Stan Edmondson =

English footballer

Personal information
- Date of birth: 10 August 1922
- Place of birth: Bacup, England
- Date of death: 1977 (aged 54–55)
- Position: Winger

Senior career*
Years	Team	Apps	(Gls)
- Bacup Borough
1946	Bradford City	3	(0)
- Rossendale United
- * Club domestic league appearances and goals

Stanley G. Edmondson (10 August 1922 – 1977) was an English footballer who played as a winger.

== Career ==
Born in Bacup, Edmondson played for Bacup Borough, Bradford City and Rossendale United.

For Bradford City he made 3 appearances in the Football League.

== Sources ==
- Frost, Terry (1988). Bradford City A Complete Record 1903-1988. Breedon Books Sport. ISBN 0-907969-38-0.
