= Trevor Edmunds =

Welsh footballer

Personal information
- Full name: Charles Trevor Edmunds
- Date of birth: 7 December 1903
- Place of birth: Merthyr Tydfil, Wales
- Date of death: 1975 (aged 71–72)
- Place of death: Worcester, England
- Position: Inside right

Senior career*
| Years | Team | Apps | (Gls) |
- Aberdare & Aberaman Athletic
| 1928–1929 | Bradford City | 19 | (11) |
| 1929–1930 | Chesterfield | 8 | (1) |
- Yeovil & Petters United
| Total | | 27 | (12) |
- * Club domestic league appearances and goals

Charles Trevor Edmunds (7 December 1903 – 1975) was a Welsh professional footballer who played as an inside right.

== Career ==
Born in Merthyr Tydfil, Edmunds played for Aberdare & Aberaman Athletic, Bradford City, Chesterfield and Yeovil & Petters United.

For Bradford City he made 19 appearances in the Football League, scoring 11 goals; he also made 2 appearances in the FA Cup.

For Chesterfield he made 8 appearances in the Football League, scoring 1 goal.

== Sources ==
- Frost, Terry (1988). Bradford City A Complete Record 1903-1988. Breedon Books Sport. ISBN 0-907969-38-0.
