= Tom Link =

English footballer

Personal information
- Full name: Thomas Henry Link
- Date of birth: 15 December 1918
- Place of birth: Halifax, England
- Date of death: May 1990 (aged 71)
- Place of death: Halifax, England
- Position: Right winger

Senior career*
| Years | Team | Apps | (Gls) |
| 1948–1949 | Bradford City | 6 | (0) |
| Total | | 6 | (0) |
- * Club domestic league appearances and goals

Thomas Henry Link (15 December 1918 – May 1990) was an English professional footballer who played as a right winger.

== Career ==
Born in Halifax, Link played minor football before joining Bradford City in May 1948. During his time with Bradford City he made six appearances in the Football League.

== Sources ==
- Frost, Terry (1988). Bradford City A Complete Record 1903-1988. Breedon Books Sport. ISBN 0-907969-38-0.
