= Cecil Price (footballer) =

Welsh footballer (1919–2008)

Personal information
- Full name: Cecil Albert Price
- Date of birth: 2 December 1919
- Place of birth: Cardiff, Wales
- Date of death: February 2008 (aged 88)
- Place of death: Bridgend, Wales
- Position: Outside forward

Senior career*
Years	Team	Apps	(Gls)
1948–1949	Cardiff City	1	(0)
1949–1950	Bradford City	7	(0)
- * Club domestic league appearances and goals

Cecil Albert Price (2 December 1919 – February 2008) was a Welsh professional footballer who played as an outside forward. He joined hometown club Cardiff City in 1948, making his professional debut in a 3–1 defeat to West Ham United in October of the same year. However, he made no further appearances for the club and left to join Bradford City in 1949 where he finished his professional career.
