= Robert Walker (footballer, born 1903) =

English footballer

Personal information
- Date of birth: 1903
- Place of birth: Bradford, England
- Height: 5 ft 8 in (1.73 m)
- Position: Centre forward

Youth career
- Wibsey

Senior career*
Years	Team	Apps	(Gls)
1920–1924	Bradford City	1	(0)
- New Brighton
- Barrow
- Bradford (Park Avenue)
Total		1	(0)
- * Club domestic league appearances and goals

Robert Walker (born 1903) was an English professional footballer who played as a centre forward.

== Career ==
Born in Bradford, Walker signed for Bradford City from Wibsey in October 1920. He made 1 league appearance for the club, before moving to New Brighton in July 1924. He also played for Barrow and Bradford (Park Avenue).

== Sources ==
- Frost, Terry (1988). Bradford City A Complete Record 1903-1988. Breedon Books Sport. ISBN 0-907969-38-0.
