= Robert Swain (footballer) =

English footballer

Personal information
- Full name: Robert Swain
- Date of birth: 26 March 1944
- Place of birth: Ripon, England
- Date of death: January 2016 (aged 71)
- Place of death: North Yorkshire, England
- Position: Winger

Senior career*
Years	Team	Apps	(Gls)
1961–1963	Bradford City	7	(0)
Total		7	(0)
- * Club domestic league appearances and goals

Robert Swain (26 March 1944 – January 2016) was an English footballer who played as a winger.

== Career ==
Born in Ripon, Swain signed for Bradford City as an amateur in September 1961. He made 7 league appearances for the club, before being released in 1963.

== Sources ==
- Frost, Terry (1988). Bradford City A Complete Record 1903-1988. Breedon Books Sport. ISBN 0-907969-38-0.
