= Clive McFadzean =

Scottish footballer

Personal information
- Full name: Clive Stuart McFadzean
- Date of birth: 11 March 1958 (age 68)
- Place of birth: Kilmarnock, Scotland
- Position: Forward

Youth career
- Farsley Celtic
- 1974–1976: Bradford City

Senior career*
Years	Team	Apps	(Gls)
1976–1977	Bradford City	4	(2)
- Ossett
- * Club domestic league appearances and goals

Clive Stuart McFadzean (born 11 March 1958) is a Scottish former professional footballer who played as a forward.

== Career ==
Born in Kilmarnock, McFadzean joined Bradford City from Farsley Celtic in November 1974. He joined the first-team in March 1976, making four league appearances for the club, scoring two goals. He was released by the club in 1977, later playing for Ossett.

== Sources ==
- Frost, Terry (1988). Bradford City A Complete Record 1903-1988. Breedon Books Sport. ISBN 0-907969-38-0.
