= Amos Dee =

Welsh footballer

Amos Dee was a Welsh professional footballer of the 1920s.

Born in Merthyr Tydfil, Dee first played for the Merthyr Tydfil Labour Club & Institute and later joined Manchester United as an amateur on 6 May 1925. He turned professional on 5 August 1925. He made 3 appearances for the Reserves in the Central League during the 1925–26 season, but was not retained for the following season. He then moved to Wolverhampton Wanderers.

After playing for Wolves he moved to Gillingham in 1928 and went on to make four appearances for the club in the English Football League. He left to join Bradford City later the same year.
