= Ken Chapman (footballer, born 1948) =

English footballer

Personal information
- Full name: Kenneth Freeman Raymond Chapman
- Date of birth: 16 November 1948 (age 77)
- Place of birth: Grimsby, England
- Position: Winger

Senior career*
Years	Team	Apps	(Gls)
1968–1969	Louth United		
1969–1970	Grimsby Town	7	(0)
1970–197?	Louth United		
- * Club domestic league appearances and goals

Kenneth Freeman Raymond Chapman (born 16 November 1948) is an English former footballer who played as a winger.
