= Ernest Storey =

English footballer

Personal information
- Position: Goalkeeper

Youth career
- Hull City

Senior career*
Years	Team	Apps	(Gls)
1908–1909	Hull City	3	(0)
1909–1911	Spennymoor United		
1911–1913	Bradford City	3	(0)
- Swansea Town
- Blyth Spartans
- Distillery
Total		12+	(0+)
- * Club domestic league appearances and goals

Ernest Storey was an English professional footballer who played as a goalkeeper.

== Career ==
Storey spent his early career with Hull City (for whom he made 3 league appearances) and Spennymoor United. He signed for Bradford City in December 1911, making 3 league appearances for the club, before signing for Swansea Town in August 1913. He later played for Blyth Spartans and Distillery.

== Sources ==
- Frost, Terry (1988). Bradford City A Complete Record 1903–1988. Breedon Books Sport. ISBN 0-907969-38-0.
