= Harold Senior =

English footballer

Personal information
- Date of birth: 1908
- Place of birth: Cleckheaton, England
- Position: Outside left

Senior career*
| Years | Team | Apps | (Gls) |
- Norristhorpe
| 1927–1929 | Bradford City | 6 | (1) |
- Derry City
- Peterborough & Fletton United
- Frickley Colliery
| Total | | 6 | (1) |
- * Club domestic league appearances and goals

Harold Senior (born 1908) was an English professional footballer who played as an outside left.

== Career ==
Born in Cleckheaton, Senior moved from Norristhorpe to Bradford City in November 1927. He scored 1 goal in 6 league appearances for the club, before moving to Derry City in July 1929. He later played for Peterborough & Fletton United and Frickley Colliery.

== Sources ==
- Frost, Terry (1988). Bradford City A Complete Record 1903-1988. Breedon Books Sport. ISBN 0-907969-38-0.
