= Bob Connor (footballer) =

English footballer (1922–2002)

Personal information
- Full name: Robert Connor
- Date of birth: 13 October 1922
- Place of birth: Bradford, England
- Date of death: October 2002 (aged 79–80)
- Place of death: Bradford, England
- Position: Goalkeeper

Youth career
- Salts

Senior career*
Years	Team	Apps	(Gls)
1949–1951	Bradford City	28	(0)
1951–1954	Wrexham	77	(0)
- Bath City
Total		105	(0)
- * Club domestic league appearances and goals

Robert Connor (13 October 1922 − October 2002) was an English professional footballer who played as a goalkeeper.

== Career ==
Born in Bradford, Connor played for Salts, Bradford City, Wrexham and Bath City.

He played for Bradford City between September 1949 and July 1951, making 28 appearances in the Football League and 2 appearances in the FA Cup for them.

== Sources ==
- Frost, Terry (1988). Bradford City A Complete Record 1903-1988. Breedon Books Sport. ISBN 0-907969-38-0.
