= Charles Emmett (footballer) =

English footballer

Personal information
- Place of birth: Newcastle, England
- Position: Left back

Senior career*
Years	Team	Apps	(Gls)
- St Anthony's
1925–1927	Bradford City	1	(0)
- Dipton United
- * Club domestic league appearances and goals

Charles P. Emmett was an English professional footballer who played as a left back.

== Career ==
Born in Newcastle, Emmett played for St Anthony's, Bradford City and Dipton United.

For Bradford City he made one appearance in the Football League.

== Sources ==
- Frost, Terry (1988). Bradford City A Complete Record 1903-1988. Breedon Books Sport. ISBN 0-907969-38-0.
