= Ken Chapman (footballer, born 1932) =

English footballer (1932–2019)

Personal information
- Full name: Kenneth Arthur Chapman
- Date of birth: 25 April 1932
- Place of birth: Coventry, England
- Date of death: 2019 (aged 86–87)
- Position: Inside left

Senior career*
Years	Team	Apps	(Gls)
- Warwick Town
	Coventry City	0	(0)
1949–1953	Blackpool	0	(0)
1953–1954	Crewe Alexandra	24	(8)
1954–1955	Bradford City	26	(4)
- Banbury Spencer
Total		50	(12)
- * Club domestic league appearances and goals

Kenneth Arthur Chapman (25 April 1932 – 2019) was an English professional footballer who played as an inside forward.

== Career ==
Born in Coventry, Chapman played for Warwick Town, Coventry City, Blackpool, Crewe Alexandra, Bradford City and Banbury Spencer.

He joined Bradford City in July 1954, making 26 league appearances (scoring 4 goals) and 2 FA Cup appearances (scoring 2 goals) for the club, before moving to Banbury Spencer in July 1955.

Chapman died in 2019.

== Sources ==
- Frost, Terry (1988). Bradford City A Complete Record 1903-1988. Breedon Books Sport. ISBN 0-907969-38-0.
