= William Penman (footballer) =

Scottish footballer

Personal information
- Date of birth: 1886
- Place of birth: Falkirk, Scotland
- Date of death: August 1907 (aged 20–21)
- Position: Centre half

Senior career*
Years	Team	Apps	(Gls)
- Ashfield
1906–1907	Bradford City	15	(1)
Total		15	(1)
- * Club domestic league appearances and goals

William Penman (1886 – August 1907) was a Scottish professional footballer who played as a centre half.

== Career ==
Born in Falkirk, Penman joined Bradford City from Ashfield in August 1906. He made 15 league appearances for the club, scoring once, as well as scoring 1 goal in 3 FA Cup games. He died from pneumonia in August 1907.

== Sources ==
- Frost, Terry (1988). Bradford City A Complete Record 1903-1988. Breedon Books Sport. ISBN 0-907969-38-0.
