= Wilf Shergold =

English footballer

Personal information
- Full name: Wilfred Frederick Shergold
- Date of birth: 18 September 1943 (age 83)
- Place of birth: Swindon, England
- Position: Left half

Youth career
- Swindon Town

Senior career*
Years	Team	Apps	(Gls)
1960–1966	Swindon Town	37	(0)
1966–1968	Bradford City	28	(2)
- Poole Town
Total		65	(2)
- * Club domestic league appearances and goals

Wilfred Frederick Shergold (born 18 September 1943) is an English former professional footballer who played as a left half.

== Career ==
Born in Swindon, Shergold began his career with Swindon Town, making 37 league appearances. He signed for Bradford City in June 1966, making 28 league appearances for the club, before moving to Poole Town in July 1968.

== Sources ==
- Frost, Terry (1988). Bradford City A Complete Record 1903-1988. Breedon Books Sport. ISBN 0-907969-38-0.
