= Robert Forsythe (footballer) =

Northern Irish footballer

Personal information
- Date of birth: 27 February 1925
- Place of birth: Belfast, Northern Ireland
- Date of death: 19 May 2016 (aged 91)
- Place of death: Larne, Antrim, Northern Ireland
- Position: Outside right

Senior career*
Years	Team	Apps	(Gls)
	Ballymoney United	0	(0)
1948–1949	Bradford City	1	(0)
- * Club domestic league appearances and goals

Robert Forsythe (27 February 1925 - 19 May 2016) was a Northern Irish former professional footballer who played as an outside right.

== Career ==
Born in Belfast, Forsythe played for Ballymoney United and Bradford City.

For Bradford City he made 1 appearance in the Football League.

== Sources ==
- Frost, Terry (1988). Bradford City A Complete Record 1903-1988. Breedon Books Sport. ISBN 0-907969-38-0.
