= Peter Quinn (forward) =

English footballer

Personal information
- Place of birth: North Shields, England
- Position: Inside forward

Senior career*
Years	Team	Apps	(Gls)
- North Shields Athletic
1919	Bradford City	4	(1)
- Coventry City
- * Club domestic league appearances and goals

Peter Quinn was an English professional footballer who played as an inside forward.

== Career ==
Born in North Shields, Quinn joined Bradford City from North Shields Athletic in July 1919. He made 4 league appearances for the club, scoring once before moving to Coventry City in November 1919.

== Sources ==
- Frost, Terry (1988). Bradford City A Complete Record 1903-1988. Breedon Books Sport. ISBN 0-907969-38-0.
