= Norman Beck (footballer) =

English footballer

Personal information
- Position: Right half

Senior career*
Years	Team	Apps	(Gls)
- Tanfield Lea Institute
1930–1931	Bradford City	3	(0)
- Barnsley
- * Club domestic league appearances and goals

Norman Beck was an English professional footballer who played as a right half.

== Career ==
Beck played for Tanfield Lea Institute, Bradford City and Barnsley. For Bradford City, he made 3 appearances in the Football League.

== Sources ==
- Frost, Terry (1988). Bradford City A Complete Record 1903-1988. Breedon Books Sport. ISBN 0-907969-38-0.
