= Reg Worsman =

English footballer (1933–2018)

Personal information
- Full name: Reginald Herbert Worsman
- Date of birth: 19 March 1933
- Place of birth: Bradford, England
- Date of death: February 2018 (aged 84)
- Place of death: Bradford, England
- Position: Inside forward

Youth career
- Bradford Park Avenue

Senior career*
Years	Team	Apps	(Gls)
1954–1956	Bradford Park Avenue	22	(5)
1956–1957	Bradford City	1	(0)
1957–1960	Nelson		
1960–1961	Darlington	4	(1)
- * Club domestic league appearances and goals

Reginald Herbert Worsman (19 March 1933 – February 2018) was an English footballer who played as an inside forward in the Football League for Bradford Park Avenue, Bradford City and Darlington. He also played non-league football for Nelson.
