= Rod Cameron (footballer) =

English footballer

Personal information
- Full name: Rodney Peter Cameron
- Date of birth: 11 April 1939 (age 87)
- Place of birth: Newcastle, England
- Position: Full back

Senior career*
Years	Team	Apps	(Gls)
- Newcastle West End
1957–1959	Bradford City	1	(0)
- Gateshead
- * Club domestic league appearances and goals

Rodney Peter Cameron (born 11 April 1939) is an English former professional footballer who played as a full back.

== Career ==
Born in Newcastle, Cameron played for Newcastle West End, Bradford City and Gateshead. For Bradford City, he made 1 appearance in the Football League.

== Sources ==
- Frost, Terry (1988). Bradford City A Complete Record 1903-1988. Breedon Books Sport. ISBN 0-907969-38-0.
