= Salts F.C. =

Association football club in England

Salts FC
- Full name: Salts Football Club
- Nickname: The Alpacas
- Founded: 1930s
- Ground: Salts Sports Association, Saltaire
- League: Yorkshire Amateur League Premier Division
- 2025–26: Yorkshire Amateur League Championship, 1st of 11 (promoted)
Home colours	Away colours

Salts Football Club (sometimes shown with (Saltaire) after Salts) is a football club based in Saltaire, West Yorkshire. They are currently members of the Yorkshire Amateur League Premier Division and play at the Salts Sports Association ground.

== History ==
The club was formed in 1923 and entered a team in the Bradford Industrial League. They remained in this league until withdrawing towards the end of the 1930–31 season. For 1931–32, a team was admitted to the Bradford Combination League, and one year later a move was made to the Bradford Amateur League. Following their policy of building an outstanding sports club the decision was made to step up in the West Riding County Amateur League, and in 1937 they finally achieved this goal. During the period 1946 to 1955 the club was one of the most successful in the league winning four championships and numerous cups, including beating Barnoldswick from the Lancashire Combination 7–0 in the 1955 West Riding County Cup final. Also, in 1948 prolific scorer Arnold Kendall joined Bradford City and later played for Bradford Park Avenue and Rochdale. The club again looked for a fresh challenge, and in 1955 they were successful in being admitted to the Yorkshire League.

The club were members of the Yorkshire Football League from 1955 to 1965. Salts were promoted to Division 1 at the first attempt under former Tottenham player Ray White, Salts also won the League Cup and the West Riding County Cup in the 1955–56 season, they also reached the 3rd round (last 16) of the FA Amateur Cup, losing to West Auckland Town. In 1956–57, a record attendance of over 5,000 at Hirst Lane watched a league match versus Selby Town. In 1957–58, Mike Hellawell played for Salts before joining Birmingham City, he later played for England. Salts again won the League Cup, but were knocked out of the Amateur Cup, losing 10–0 to Corinthian Casuals in the 2nd round. Former Bradford City player Dick Conroy took over as manager but Salts were relegated back to Division 2, they did reach the 3rd round again in the Amateur Cup, losing to Briggs Sports from London. In 1965, Salts joined the West Yorkshire League, later returning to the West Riding County Amateur League. In 1988, Salts were the first ever opposition for newly formed Bradford Park Avenue, at Park Avenue's first home at Manningham Mills. Their Hirst Lane ground was used as the home stadium of the fictional Barnstoneworth United in the TV programme Ripping Yarns.
