= Kian Scales =

English footballer

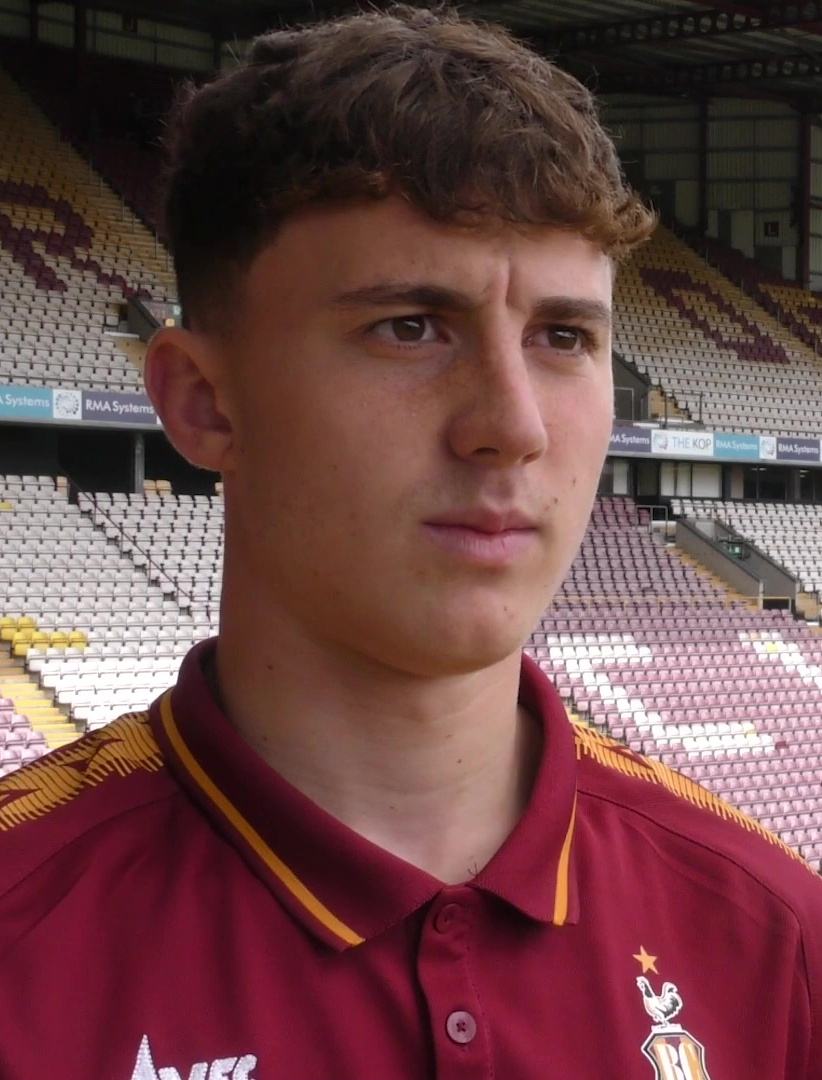

Personal information
- Full name: Kian Scales
- Date of birth: 9 November 2001 (age 25)
- Place of birth: Leeds, England
- Position: Midfielder

Team information
- Current team: Buxton

Youth career
- 2014–2020: Bradford City

Senior career*
Years	Team	Apps	(Gls)
2020–2023	Bradford City	22	(1)
2020	→ Bradford (Park Avenue) (loan)	0	(0)
2021–2022	→ Farsley Celtic (loan)	5	(0)
2022–2023	→ Farsley Celtic (loan)	42	(3)
2023–2026	Scunthorpe United	107	(6)
2026	→ Radcliffe (loan)	16	(1)
2026–	Buxton	0	(0)
- * Club domestic league appearances and goals as of 18:07, 22 March 2026 (UTC)

Kian Scales (born 9 November 2001) is an English professional footballer who plays as a midfielder for Buxton.

Scales began his career with Bradford City, and spent time on loan at Bradford (Park Avenue) and Farsley Celtic, before signing for Scunthorpe United.

== Career ==
=== Bradford City ===
Born in Leeds, Scales began his career playing for the Bradford City youth team, joining at the age of 12 or 13. In March 2020 he moved on loan to Bradford (Park Avenue). He turned professional in July 2020, signing a one-year contract.

He made his senior debut for Bradford City on 8 September 2020, in the EFL Trophy. In early December 2020 he spoke about his recent run of first-team action, and the trust placed in City's young players by manager Stuart McCall.

After impressing new managers Mark Trueman and Connor Sellars, on 23 March 2021 Scales made his second league start for the club. He scored his first senior goal on 27 March 2021. The goal was later voted as the club's Goal of the Month for March 2021 by fans.

In April 2021 Sellars said he was happy for young players like Scales and Finn Cousin-Dawson to be playing regular first team football.

On 12 May 2021 he was one of four players offered a new contract by Bradford City. On 16 June 2021 he signed a new two-year contract with the club. In July 2021 he spoke about learning from teammates ahead of the new season.

He was made available for loan to National League clubs in September 2021. He moved on loan to Farsley Celtic in November 2021. After returning from his loan in January 2022, he was made available for loan again.

Ahead of the 2022–23 season he said he was looking forward to more game time, whether with Bradford City or out on loan. He re-joined Farsley Celtic on loan in August 2022. He said he thought his time in non-league would toughen him up for a return to Bradford City. In January 2023 his loan was extended until the end of February, and in February the loan was extended until the end of the season.

=== Scunthorpe United ===
In May 2023 it was announced that he would leave Bradford City when his contract expired on 30 June, and in June it was announced he would sign for Scunthorpe United.

On 6 January 2026, Scales joined National League North side Radcliffe on an initial one-month loan. On 8 May 2026, Scunthorpe announced the player would be leaving in the summer when his contract expired.

=== Buxton ===
He signed for Buxton in June 2026.

== Career statistics ==
As of 9 May 2024

Appearances and goals by club, season and competition
Club	Season	League			FA Cup		League Cup		Other		Total	
Club	Season	Division	Apps	Goals	Apps	Goals	Apps	Goals	Apps	Goals	Apps	Goals
Bradford City	2019–20	League Two	0	0	0	0	0	0	0	0	0	0
Bradford City	2020–21	League Two	20	1	0	0	0	0	3 (Note: Appearance(s) in EFL Trophy)	0	23	1
Bradford City	2021–22	League Two	2	0	0	0	0	0	2	0	4	0
Bradford City	2022–23	League Two	0	0	0	0	0	0	0	0	0	0
Bradford City	Total		22	1	0	0	0	0	5	0	27	1
Bradford (Park Avenue) (loan)	2019–20	National League North	0	0	0	0	0	0	0	0	0	0
Farsley Celtic (loan)	2021–22	National League North	5	0	0	0	0	0	1 (Note: Appearance(s) in the FA Trophy.)	0	6	0
Farsley Celtic (loan)	2022–23	National League North	42	3	0	0	0	0	4	2	46	5
Scunthorpe United	2023–24	National League North	44	1	0	0	0	0	2	0	46	1
Career total			113	5	0	0	0	0	12	2	125	7

== Honours ==
Scunthorpe United

- National League North play-offs: 2025
