= 2020–21 Bradford City A.F.C. season =

Bradford City
2020–21 season
- Chairman: Stefan Rupp
- Manager: Stuart McCall (until 13 December); Mark Trueman and Conor Sellars (joint managers from 14 December)
- Stadium: Utilita Energy Stadium
- League Two: 15th
- FA Cup: Second round
- EFL Cup: Second round
- EFL Trophy: Group stage
- Top goalscorer: League: Andy Cook (8); All: Andy Cook (8)
Home colours	Away colours	Third colours

The 2020–21 Bradford City A.F.C. season was the 118th edition of Bradford City A.F.C. and the second consecutive season in EFL League Two, Along with League Two, the club contested in the FA Cup, EFL Cup and EFL Trophy.

The season covers the period from 1 July 2020 to 30 June 2021.

== Pre-season ==
On 18 August 2020, Bradford faced Doncaster Rovers in a behind closed doors friendly, the Bantams lost the match 4–3 with Kurtis Guthrie scoring a brace of goals with another one added by Billy Clarke. Two days later it was announced that Bradford would face local rivals Huddersfield Town in a behind closed doors friendly at the Terriers training ground. Later on that week the match against Huddersfield was given the green light to play at Kirklees Stadium. Bradford's final pre-season match ended in a 3–2 defeat at the hands of Wigan Athletic.

Date	Opponents	H / A	Result F–A	Scorers	Attendance
18 August 2020	Doncaster Rovers	H	3–4	Clarke 49', Guthrie (2) 59', 70'	0
26 August 2020	Huddersfield Town	A	1–2	Mottley-Henry 2'	0
29 August 2020	Wigan Athletic	H	2–3	Scales 19', Pritchard 81'	0

== Competitions ==
=== EFL League Two ===
==== League table ====
Pos	Team	Pld	W	D	L	GF	GA	GD	Pts
11	Leyton Orient	46	17	10	19	53	55	−2	61
12	Crawley Town	46	16	13	17	56	62	−6	61
13	Port Vale	46	17	9	20	57	57	0	60
14	Stevenage	46	14	18	14	41	41	0	60
15	Bradford City	46	16	11	19	48	53	−5	59
16	Mansfield Town	46	13	19	14	57	55	+2	58
17	Harrogate Town	46	16	9	21	52	61	−9	57
18	Oldham Athletic	46	15	9	22	72	81	−9	54
19	Walsall	46	11	20	15	45	53	−8	53

Updated to match(es) played on 31 May 2021. Source: EFL Official Website
Rules for classification: 1) Points; 2) Goal difference; 3) Number of goals scored; 4) Head-to-head results; 5) Wins; 6) Away goals; 7) Penalty points (sec 9.5); 8) 12-point sending off offences

==== Results summary ====
Overall								Home						Away					
Pld	W	D	L	GF	GA	GD	Pts	W	D	L	GF	GA	GD	W	D	L	GF	GA	GD
46	16	11	19	48	53	−5	59	9	7	7	22	19	+3	7	4	12	26	34	−8

Last updated: 8 May 2021.
Source: BBC

==== Results by matchday ====
Matchday	1	2	3	4	5	6	7	8	9	10	11	12	13	14	15	16	17	18	19	20	21	22	23	24	25	26	27	28	29	30	31	32	33	34	35	36	37	38	39	40	41	42	43	44	45	46
Ground	H	A	H	H	A	H	H	A	A	H	H	A	A	H	H	A	A	H	A	A	H	A	A	H	A	H	A	H	A	H	H	A	A	H	A	A	H	A	H	H	A	H	A	H	H	A
Result	D	D	W	L	W	D	L	L	L	W	D	L	L	L	L	L	D	W	W	W	D	D	W	W	L	W	W	W	W	W	D	L	L	D	L	W	W	D	W	L	L	L	L	L	D	L
Position	14	15	9	16	13	14	15	15	16	15	16	19	20	21	23	22	21	21	18	18	18	20	18	17	19	16	13	11	11	10	10	12	13	12	14	12	10	11	11	12	13	13	14	14	14	15

Updated to match(es) played on 8 May 2021. Source: 11v11 for league tables and fixtures
A = Away; H = Home; W = Win; D = Draw; L = Loss

==== Matches ====
Win Draw Loss Postponed

The 2020–21 season fixtures were released on 21 August.

Date	Opponents	H / A	Result F–A	Scorers	Attendance
12 September 2020	Colchester United	H	0–0		0
19 September 2020	Forest Green Rovers	A	2–2	Novak 49', Watt 66'	1,000
26 September 2020	Stevenage	H	2–1	Novak (2) 61', 81'	0
3 October 2020	Grimsby Town	A	P–P		
12 October 2020	Harrogate Town	H	0–1		0
17 October 2020	Mansfield Town	A	3–1	Štěch 8' (o.g.), Wood 14', Donaldson 69'	0
20 October 2020	Walsall	H	1–1	Clarke 76' (pen.)	0
24 October 2020	Newport County	H	0–3		0
27 October 2020	Bolton Wanderers	A	0–1		0
31 October 2020	Barrow	A	0–1		0
3 November 2020	Southend United	H	3–0	Cooke 5', Watt 33', Pritchard 43'	0
14 November 2020	Exeter City	H	2–2	Clarke 10', Staunton 45+1'	0
21 November 2020	Salford City	A	0–3		0
24 November 2020	Leyton Orient	A	0–1		0
1 December 2020	Cheltenham Town	H	1–2	Donaldson 23’	0
5 December 2020	Carlisle United	H	0–1		0
12 December 2020	Oldham Athletic	A	1–3	P.O'Connor 85'	0
15 December 2020	Crawley Town	A	1–1	Novak 11'	0
19 December 2020	Cambridge United	H	1–0	Pritchard 42'	0
22 December 2020	Grimsby Town	A	2–1	Novak 21', Sutton 45'	0
26 December 2020	Tranmere Rovers	A	1–0	Novak 62'	2,000
29 December 2020	Port Vale	H	0–0		0
2 January 2021	Morecambe	H	P–P		
9 January 2021	Scunthorpe United	A	P–P		
16 January 2021	Crawley Town	H	P–P		
23 January 2021	Cambridge United	A	0–0		0
26 January 2021	Southend United	A	3–1	Evans (2) 23', 74', Rowe 57'	0
30 January 2021	Barrow	H	2–1	Rowe 5', Cooke 49'	0
6 February 2021	Exeter City	A	2–3	Vernam 17', Crankshaw 45'	0
9 February 2021	Scunthorpe United	A	P–P		
13 February 2021	Salford City	H	P–P		
16 February 2021	Morecambe	H	2–1	A.O'Connor 28', Vernam 63'	0
20 February 2021	Cheltenham Town	A	2–0	Cook (2) 12', 51'	0
23 February 2021	Leyton Orient	H	1–0	Cooke 81' (pen.)	0
27 February 2021	Walsall	A	2–1	Sutton 43', Cook 66'	0
2 March 2021	Mansfield Town	H	1–0	Rowe 32'	0
6 March 2021	Bolton Wanderers	H	1−1	Rowe 90+3'	0
9 March 2021	Newport County	A	1−2	Cook 46’	0
13 March 2021	Carlisle United	A	1–3	Evans 64'	0
20 March 2021	Oldham Athletic	H	0–0		0
23 March 2021	Scunthorpe United	A	0–2		0
27 March 2021	Colchester United	A	2–1	Scales 10', Cook 58'	0
2 April 2021	Forest Green Rovers	H	4–1	Watt 11', Cook (2) 47', 76', Rowe 90+4'	0
5 April 2021	Stevenage	A	1–1	Donaldson 27'	0
10 April 2021	Grimsby Town	H	1–0	A.O'Connor 42'	0
13 April 2021	Crawley Town	H	0–2		0
17 April 2021	Harrogate Town	A	1–2	Cook 72'	0
20 April 2021	Tranmere Rovers	H	0–1		0
24 April 2021	Port Vale	A	1–2	Donaldson 14'	0
27 April 2021	Salford City	H	0–1		0
1 May 2021	Scunthorpe United	H	0–0		0
8 May 2021	Morecambe	A	0–2		0

=== FA Cup ===
The draw for the first round was made on Monday 26, October. The second round draw was revealed on Monday, 9 November by Danny Cowley.

Win Draw Loss

Date	Round	Opponents	H / A	Result F–A	Scorers	Attendance
7 November 2020	First Round	Tonbridge Angels	A	7–0	A.O'Connor 6', Clarke (2) 14', 45', Donaldson 55', Samuels 69', Pritchard 83', Wood 90+1'	0
28 November 2020	Second Round	Oldham Athletic	H	1–2	Donaldson 11' (pen.)	0

=== EFL Cup ===
Win Draw Loss

The first round draw was made on 18 August, live on Sky Sports, by Paul Merson. The draw for both the second and third round were confirmed on September 6, live on Sky Sports by Phil Babb.

Date	Round	Opponents	H / A	Result F–A	Scorers	Attendance
5 September 2020	Round 1	Bolton Wanderers	A	2–1	Novak 26', Pritchard 75'	0
15 September 2020	Round 2	Lincoln City	H	0–5		0

=== EFL Trophy ===
Win Draw Loss

The regional group stage draw was confirmed on 18 August.

Pos	Div	Team	Pld	W	PW	PL	L	GF	GA	GD	Pts	Qualification
1	L2	Oldham Athletic	3	3	0	0	0	9	1	+8	9	Advance to Round 2
2	ACA	Wolverhampton Wanderers U21	3	1	1	0	1	3	6	−3	5	Advance to Round 2
3	L2	Bradford City	3	0	0	2	1	2	4	−2	2	
4	L1	Doncaster Rovers	3	0	1	0	2	1	4	−3	2	

Source: EFL.com

Date	Round	Opponents	H / A	Result F–A	Scorers	Attendance
8 September 2020	Group Stage	Doncaster Rovers	A	0–0 (1–4 p)		0
6 October 2020	Group Stage	Wolverhampton Wanderers U21's	H	1–1 (3–5 p)	Donaldson 83'	0
10 November 2020	Group Stage	Oldham Athletic	H	1–3	Sutton 60' (o.g.)	0

== Squad statistics ==
No.	Pos.	Name	League		FA Cup		EFL Cup		EFL Trophy		Total		Discipline	
No.	Pos.	Name	Apps	Goals	Apps	Goals	Apps	Goals	Apps	Goals	Apps	Goals	Yellow card	Red card
1	GK	(England) Richard O'Donnell	28	0	2	0	2	0	0	0	32	0	0	0
2	DF	(England) Bryce Hosannah	8	0	2	0	0	0	1	0	11	0	1	0
4	DF	(Republic of Ireland) Paudie O'Connor	41(1)	1	2	0	2	0	2	0	47(1)	1	11	1
5	DF	(Republic of Ireland) Niall Canavan	15(1)	0	0	0	0	0	0	0	15(1)	0	1	0
6	DF	(Republic of Ireland) Anthony O'Connor	45	2	2	1	2	0	0	0	49	3	6	1
7	MF	(England) Harry Pritchard	11(5)	2	1	1	1(1)	1	2	0	15(6)	4	2	0
8	MF	(England) Callum Cooke	30(4)	3	1(1)	0	2	0	0	0	33(5)	3	3	0
9	FW	(England) Lee Novak	15(2)	6	0	0	1	1	0	0	16(2)	7	2	0
10	FW	(Jamaica) Clayton Donaldson	19(16)	4	2	2	1(1)	0	2	1	24(17)	7	3	0
11	MF	(England) Zeli Ismail	1(2)	0	1	0	0	0	1	0	3(2)	0	0	0
12	MF	(England) Jordan Stevens	1(15)	0	0	0	0	0	0	0	1(15)	0	0	0
13	GK	(England) Sam Hornby	18	0	0	0	0	0	3	0	21	0	1	0
14	DF	(England) Matty Foulds	0(3)	0	0	0	0	0	0	0	0(3)	0	0	0
15	MF	(England) Charles Vernam	15(6)	2	0	0	0	0	0	0	15(6)	2	0	0
16	FW	(Republic of Ireland) Billy Clarke	20(9)	2	2	2	2	0	0	0	24(9)	4	2	0
17	MF	(England) Gareth Evans	19(8)	3	0(1)	0	0	0	0	0	19(9)	3	1	0
18	MF	(Scotland) Elliot Watt	44(2)	3	2	0	1	0	0	0	47(2)	3	8	0
19	FW	(England) Rumarn Burrell	0(2)	0	0	0	0	0	0	0	0(2)	0	0	0
20	GK	(England) Will Huffer	0	0	0	0	0	0	0	0	0	0	0	0
21	DF	(Republic of Ireland) Reece Staunton	8	1	1	0	1(1)	0	0(2)	0	10(3)	1	3	0
22	DF	(England) Levi Sutton	30(4)	2	0	0	0	0	2	0	34(4)	2	7	1
23	DF	(England) Connor Wood	46	1	2	1	2	0	0	0	50	2	4	0
24	DF	(England) Finn Cousin-Dawson	20(3)	0	0	0	0	0	3	0	23(3)	0	5	0
25	DF	(Poland) Jorge Sikora	1	0	0	0	0	0	3	0	4	0	0	0
26	MF	(England) Kian Scales	6(14)	1	0	0	0	0	3	0	9(14)	1	1	0
27	MF	(England) Connor Shanks	0	0	0	0	0	0	2(1)	0	2(1)	0	1	0
29	FW	(England) Andy Cook	16(5)	8	0	0	0	0	0	0	16(5)	8	1	0
31	MF	(England) Ollie Crankshaw	11(8)	1	0	0	0	0	0	0	11(8)	1	2	0
33	FW	(England) Charlie Wood	0	0	0	0	0	0	0(1)	0	0(1)	0	0	0
34	MF	(Poland) Olivier Sukiennicki	0	0	0	0	0	0	0(1)	0	0(1)	0	0	0
Players out on loan for rest of the season
Players left during the season
-	DF	(England) Tyler French	7(7)	0	0(1)	0	2	0	1(1)	0	10(9)	0	2	0
-	FW	(Jersey) Kurtis Guthrie	4(4)	0	0	0	2	0	0(1)	0	6(5)	0	0	0
-	DF	(Scotland) Jackson Longridge	0(2)	0	0	0	0	0	3	0	3(2)	0	0	0
-	MF	(England) Dylan Mottley-Henry	4(7)	0	0(2)	0	0(1)	0	3	0	7(10)	0	0	0
-	DF	(England) Ben Richards-Everton	9(1)	0	1	0	1	0	2	0	13(1)	0	1	0
-	FW	(England) Danny Rowe	8(10)	5	0	0	0	0	0	0	8(10)	5	4	0
-	FW	(England) Austin Samuels	6(6)	0	1(1)	1	0	0	0	0	7(7)	1	0	0
-	–	Own goals	–	1	–	0	–	0	–	1	–	2	–	–

As of 11 May 2021.

== Transfers ==
=== Transfers in ===
Date	Position	Nationality	Name	From	Fee	Ref.
11 July 2020	RB	(England)	Levi Sutton	(England) Scunthorpe United	Free transfer	
17 July 2020	AM	(Republic of Ireland)	Billy Clarke	(England) Grimsby Town	Free transfer	
25 July 2020	AM	(England)	Callum Cooke	(England) Peterborough United	Free transfer	
27 July 2020	CM	(Scotland)	Elliot Watt	(England) Wolverhampton Wanderers	Undisclosed	
25 September 2020	AM	(England)	Gareth Evans	(England) Portsmouth	Free transfer	
7 January 2021	GK	(England)	Will Huffer	(England) Bradford (Park Avenue)	Free transfer	
12 January 2021	CB	(Republic of Ireland)	Niall Canavan	(England) Plymouth Argyle	Undisclosed	
16 January 2021	LB	(England)	Matty Foulds	(Italy) Como 1907	Free transfer	
20 January 2021	CF	(England)	Danny Rowe	(England) Oldham Athletic	Undisclosed	
1 February 2021	AM	(England)	Charles Vernam	(England) Burton Albion	Undisclosed	
1 February 2021	AM	(England)	Ollie Crankshaw	(England) Wigan Athletic	Undisclosed	

=== Loans in ===
Date from	Position	Nationality	Name	From	Date until	Ref.
29 September 2020	RB	(England)	Bryce Hosannah	(England) Leeds United	End of season	
10 October 2020	CF	(England)	Austin Samuels	(England) Wolverhampton Wanderers	January 2021	
8 January 2021	RW	(England)	Jordan Stevens	(England) Leeds United	End of season	
14 January 2021	CF	(England)	Rumarn Burrell	(England) Middlesbrough	End of season	
27 January 2021	CF	(England)	Andy Cook	(England) Mansfield Town	End of season	

=== Transfers out ===
Date	Position	Nationality	Name	To	Fee	Ref.
1 July 2020	CM	(Nigeria)	Hope Akpan	(Finland) SJK Seinäjoki	Released	
1 July 2020	CM	(England)	Jermaine Anderson	(England) Aldershot Town	Released	
1 July 2020	CM	(England)	Danny Devine	(England) Carlisle United	Released	
1 July 2020	LW	(England)	Jordan Gibson	(Republic of Ireland) St Patrick's Athletic	Released	
1 July 2020	RB	(Wales)	Adam Henley	(England) Chorley	Released	
1 July 2020	SS	(Northern Ireland)	Shay McCartan	(Northern Ireland) Ballymena United	Released	
1 July 2020	RB	(England)	Kelvin Mellor	(England) Morecambe	Released	
1 July 2020	CM	(England)	Jake Reeves	(England) Notts County	Released	
1 July 2020	RB	(England)	Joe Riley	(England) Carlisle United	Released	
1 July 2020	GK	(England)	George Sykes-Kenworthy	(England) Derby County	Released	
1 July 2020	LM	(England)	Chris Taylor	(England) Barrow FC	Released	
11 August 2020	CF	(England)	James Vaughan	(England) Tranmere Rovers	Mutual consent	
17 October 2020	CM	(England)	Eliot Goldthorp	(England) Frickley Athletic	Free transfer	
11 January 2021	CB	(England)	Ben Richards-Everton	(England) Barnet FC	Mutual consent	
15 January 2021	CF	(England)	Kurtis Guthrie	(England) Port Vale	Free transfer	
19 January 2021	LB	(Scotland)	Jackson Longridge	(Scotland) Livingston FC	Mutual consent	
31 January 2021	CB	(England)	Tyler French	(Wales) Wrexham A.F.C.	Mutual consent	
31 January 2021	MF	(England)	Dylan Mottley-Henry	(Northern Ireland) Larne FC	Mutual consent	
22 April 2021	CF	(England)	Danny Rowe	(England) Chesterfield F.C.	Undisclosed	
