= Finn Cousin-Dawson =

English footballer

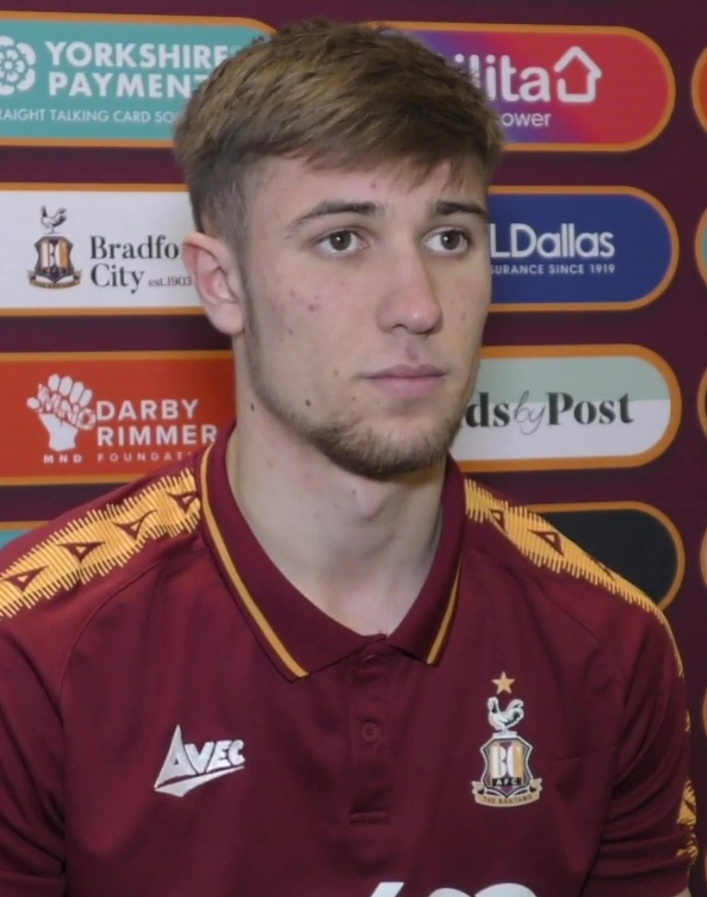

Personal information
- Full name: Finn Cousin-Dawson
- Date of birth: 4 July 2002 (age 24)
- Place of birth: Stockton-on-Tees, England
- Height: 1.83 m (6 ft 0 in)
- Positions: Centre-back; right-back

Team information
- Current team: Buxton

Youth career
- Bradford City

Senior career*
Years	Team	Apps	(Gls)
2019–2024	Bradford City	34	(0)
2019–2020	→ Brighouse Town (loan)	7	(0)
2022–2023	→ Spennymoor Town (loan)	21	(0)
2023	→ Blyth Spartans (loan)	15	(0)
2023–2024	→ Blyth Spartans (loan)	44	(3)
2024–2026	Yeovil Town	77	(3)
2026–	Buxton	0	(0)

International career^{‡}
2021–2022	Northern Ireland U21	7	(0)
- * Club domestic league appearances and goals as of 23:07, 29 June 2026 (UTC) ‡ National team caps and goals as of 23:11, 28 March 2022 (UTC)

Finn Cousin-Dawson (born 4 July 2002) is a professional footballer who plays as a centre-back for National League North club Buxton. Born in England, he represented Northern Ireland at under-21 youth level.

== Club career ==
Born in Stockton-on-Tees, Cousin-Dawson began his career with the Bradford City youth team. He moved on loan to Brighouse Town in November 2019, being recalled in January 2020, ahead of Bradford City's FA Youth Cup game against Chelsea. He turned professional in July 2020, signing a one-year contract.

He made his senior debut for Bradford City on 8 September 2020, in the EFL Trophy. In November 2020 he was one of a number of young Bradford City players playing in the first team who were praised by manager Stuart McCall. In December 2020 he spoke about the impact of coronavirus on football, including lack of fans at stadiums.

In January 2021 he signed a new contract with the club, running until summer 2024. In February 2021 he was dropped from the starting line-up after making 9 consecutive starts, with club joint manager Mark Trueman saying that Cousin-Dawson would help him cope with the mental and physical stress of first-team football. In April 2021 club joint manager Conor Sellars said he was happy for young players like Cousin-Dawson and Kian Scales to be playing regular first team football.

At the start of the 2021–22 season, it was announced that Cousin-Dawson would start the club's second game of the season, an EFL Cup game away to Nottingham Forest. He later said that his skills were improving, due in part to the expected standards of new manager Derek Adams.

In July 2022 he signed on loan for Spennymoor Town. Cousin-Dawson said that the loan was the "best thing" for him so that he could get regular playing time again. He was recalled by Bradford City in January 2023, with a view to making a further loan move. On 2 February, Cousin-Dawson returned to the National League North on an initial one-month loan deal with Blyth Spartans. Later that month the loan was extended until the end of the season.

In July 2023, he returned on loan to Blyth Spartans for the 2023–24 season.

He was released by Bradford City at the end of the 2023–24 season.

On 12 June 2024, Cousin-Dawson signed a two-year contract with National League side Yeovil Town ahead of the 2024–25 season. He was released by Yeovil Town at the end of the 2025–26 season.

On 22 June 2026, Cousin-Dawson signed for National League North side Buxton ahead of the 2026–27 season.

== International career ==
In March 2021 Cousin-Dawson was called-up to a training camp with the Northern Ireland under-21 team. He left early in order to return to Bradford City for a match. He received a second call up in May 2021. He made his under-21 international debut in June 2021 in a friendly against Scotland, and received a further call-up in August 2021.

In October 2021 Bradford City boss Derek Adams said that Cousin-Dawson's international experience was helping him mature as a player. He made two appearances for the under-21s that month. In November 2021 he made a further appearance, his first full international match.

He was recalled by Northern Ireland under-21s in March 2022. Club manager Mark Hughes said it was an opportunity for the player to impress him. Cousin-Dawson made one appearance, playing 90 minutes in a friendly against France, having not played in the earlier Under-21 Euro Qualifier against Slovakia.

== Playing style ==
Primarily a centre-back, Cousin-Dawson has also played a right-back and was used as a holding midfielder for the first time on 6 October 2020 in the EFL Trophy, with Bradford City manager Stuart McCall suggesting it could become his permanent new position.

== Career statistics ==
As of end of 2025–26 season

Appearances and goals by club, season and competition
Club	Season	League			FA Cup		League Cup		Other		Total	
Club	Season	Division	Apps	Goals	Apps	Goals	Apps	Goals	Apps	Goals	Apps	Goals
Bradford City	2019–20	League Two	0	0	0	0	0	0	0	0	0	0
Bradford City	2020–21	League Two	23	0	0	0	0	0	3 (Note: Appearance(s) in the Football League Trophy.)	0	26	0
Bradford City	2021–22	League Two	11	0	1	0	1	0	1	0	14	0
Bradford City	2022–23	League Two	0	0	0	0	0	0	0	0	0	0
Bradford City	2023–24	League Two	0	0	0	0	0	0	0	0	0	0
Bradford City	Total		34	0	1	0	1	0	4	0	40	0
Brighouse Town (loan)	2019–20	NPL D1 NW	7	0	0	0	—		0	0	7	0
Spennymoor Town (loan)	2022–23	National League North	21	0	0	0	—		2 (Note: Appearance(s) in the FA Trophy.)	0	23	0
Blyth Spartans (loan)	2022–23	National League North	15	0	0	0	—		0	0	15	0
Blyth Spartans (loan)	2023–24	National League North	44	3	0	0	—		2	0	46	3
Yeovil Town	2024–25	National League	37	2	0	0	—		1	0	38	2
Yeovil Town	2025–26	National League	40	1	1	0	—		4	0	45	1
Yeovil Town	Total		77	3	1	0	—		5	0	83	3
Career total			198	6	2	0	1	0	13	0	214	6
