= 2022–23 Bradford City A.F.C. season =

Bradford City
2022–23 season
- Chairman: Stefan Rupp
- Manager: Mark Hughes
- Stadium: Valley Parade
- League Two: 6th
- FA Cup: First round
- EFL Cup: Second round
- EFL Trophy: Round of 32
- Top goalscorer: League: Andy Cook (23); All: Andy Cook (26)
- Highest home attendance: 22,756 vs Leyton Orient, 8 May 2023, League Two
- Lowest home attendance: 5,394 vs Hull City, 9 August 2022, EFL Cup
- Biggest win: 3–0 vs. Stevenage (17 September 2022)
- Biggest defeat: 0-3 vs. Leyton Orient (3 December 2022
Home colours	Away colours	Third colours

The 2022–23 season was the 120th season in the existence of Bradford City Association Football Club and the club's fourth consecutive season in League Two. In addition to the league, they also competed in the FA Cup, the EFL Cup and the EFL Trophy.

== Pre-season ==
On June 8, Bradford City announced their pre-season schedule, which included a six-day training camp in Murcia. A sixth addition to the calendar was later confirmed, against Derby County.

Date	Opponents	H / A	Result F–A	Scorers	Attendance
1 July 2022	Bradford Park Avenue	A	2–0	Chapman 34', Harratt 64'	2,583
9 July 2022	Derby County	H	0–2	—	4,218
16 July 2022	York City	A	4–1	Scales 13', Cook 24', Angol 47', Harratt 80'	2,411
19 July 2022	Sunderland	H	2–0	Osadebe 51', Walker 74' (pen.)	4,022
23 July 2022	Chesterfield	A	0–3	—	2,408
26 July 2022	Eccleshill United	A	2–3	Roberts (2) 6', 32'	—

== Competitions ==
=== Overall record ===
Competition	First match	Last match	Starting round	Final position	Record							
Competition	First match	Last match	Starting round	Final position	Pld	W	D	L	GF	GA	GD	Win %
League Two	30 July 2022	May 2023	Matchday 1		26	11	8	7	31	25	+6	42.31
FA Cup	5 November 2022		First round	First round	1	0	0	1	0	1	−1	0.00
EFL Cup	9 August 2022	23 August 2022	First round	Second round	2	1	0	1	3	3	+0	50.00
EFL Trophy	30 August 2022	22 November 2022	Group stage	Round of 32	4	1	1	2	5	8	−3	25.00
Total					33	13	9	11	39	37	+2	39.39

Last updated: 14 January 2023
Source: [ Soccerway]

=== League Two ===
==== League table ====
Pos	Team	Pld	W	D	L	GF	GA	GD	Pts	Promotion, qualification or relegation
3	Northampton Town (P)	46	23	14	9	62	42	+20	83	Promotion to EFL League One
4	Stockport County	46	22	13	11	65	37	+28	79	Qualification for League Two play-offs
5	Carlisle United (O, P)	46	20	16	10	66	43	+23	76	Qualification for League Two play-offs
6	Bradford City	46	20	16	10	61	43	+18	76	Qualification for League Two play-offs
7	Salford City	46	22	9	15	72	54	+18	75	Qualification for League Two play-offs
8	Mansfield Town	46	21	12	13	72	55	+17	75	
9	Barrow	46	18	8	20	47	53	−6	62	

Source: EFL Official Website
Rules for classification: 1) Points; 2) Goal difference; 3) Number of goals scored; 4) Head-to-head results; 5) Wins; 6) Away goals; 7) Penalty points (sec 9.5); 8) 12-point sending off offences
(O) Play-off winners; (P) Promoted

==== Results summary ====
Overall								Home						Away					
Pld	W	D	L	GF	GA	GD	Pts	W	D	L	GF	GA	GD	W	D	L	GF	GA	GD
46	20	16	10	60	42	+18	76	9	10	4	32	23	+9	11	6	6	28	19	+9

Last updated: 3 May 2023.
Source: [ Soccerway]

==== Results by round ====
Round	1	2	3	4	5	6	7	8	9	10	11	12	13	14	15	16	17	18	19	20	21	22	23	24	25	26	27	28	29	30	31	32	33	34	35	36	37	38	39	40	41	42	43	44	45	46
Ground	H	A	H	A	A	H	H	A	H	H	A	H	A	A	H	H	A	A	H	A	A	H	H	H	A	A	H	A	H	H	A	A	H	A	A	H	H	H	A	H	A	A	H	A	A	H
Result	D	L	W	L	W	D	W	W	W	D	W	L	W	D	D	D	W	W	L	L	L	W	W	L	D	D	D	W	W	L	W	W	W	D	D	D	D	W	D	W	W	L	D	W	L	D
Position	13	15	11	14	11	10	8	6	5	7	4	6	5	6	7	6	5	4	5	6	9	7	5	5	7	8	9	8	8	8	8	6	5	5	6	6	5	6	6	6	6	6	7	7	7	6

Updated to match(es) played on 3 May 2023. Source: [ Soccerway]
A = Away; H = Home; W = Win; D = Draw; L = Loss; P = Postponed

==== Matches ====
Win Draw Loss Fixtures

On 23 June, the league fixtures were announced.

Date	Opponents	H / A	Result F–A	Scorers	Attendance
30 July 2022	Doncaster Rovers	H	0–0	—	19,368
6 August 2022	Barrow	A	2–3	Young 65', Cook 90+5'	4,012
13 August 2022	Newport County	H	2–0	Smallwood 7', Chapman 53'	16,704
16 August 2022	Colchester United	A	0–1	—	3,011
20 August 2022	Hartlepool United	A	3–1	Banks 6', Cook (2) 65', 90+2'	5,103
27 August 2022	Crewe Alexandra	H	0–0	—	16,541
3 September 2022	Walsall	H	2–1	Cook 41', Young 45'	16,433
10 September 2022	Mansfield Town	A	Postponed		
13 September 2022	Tranmere Rovers	A	2–1	Cook (2) 3', 75'	5,864
17 September 2022	Stevenage	H	3–0	Cook (2) 6', 56', Wright 62'	16,917
24 September 2022	AFC Wimbledon	H	2–2	Banks 4', Oliver 90+5'	17,186
1 October 2022	Harrogate Town	A	2–1	Cook 15' (pen.), Wright 73'	2,505
8 October 2022	Stockport County	H	0–1	—	18,615
15 October 2022	Salford City	A	1–0	Cook 13'	3,924
22 October 2022	Grimsby Town	A	0–0	—	8,020
25 October 2022	Swindon Town	H	1–1	Wright 31'	16,728
29 October 2022	Crawley Town	H	1–1	Pereira 55'	16,510
8 November 2022	Mansfield Town	A	2–1	Smallwood 30', Cook 53'	7,650
12 November 2022	Sutton United	A	2–0	Cook 37', Banks 51'	3,323
19 November 2022	Northampton Town	H	1–3	Cook 90+2' (pen.)	18,666
3 December 2022	Leyton Orient	A	0–3	—	8,671
10 December 2022	Gillingham	A	Postponed		
17 December 2022	Rochdale	H	Postponed		
26 December 2022	Carlisle United	A	0–1	—	8,296
29 December 2022	Harrogate Town	H	1–0	Wright 1'	17,056
1 January 2023	Salford City	H	3–2	Oliver (2) 8', 27', Eisa 68'	17,521
10 January 2023	Rochdale	H	1–2	Eisa 29'	17,061
14 January 2023	AFC Wimbledon	A	0–0	—	8,383
21 January 2023	Carlisle United	H	Postponed		
24 January 2023	Stockport County	A	0–0	—	8,991
4 February 2023	Mansfield Town	H	1–1	Cook 29'	18,755
11 February 2023	Stevenage	A	3–2	Derbyshire 49', Cook 56' (pen.), Walker 86'	5,037
14 February 2023	Tranmere Rovers	H	2–0	Walker 43', Cook 74'	15,482
18 February 2023	Barrow	H	0–1	—	17,071
25 February 2023	Doncaster Rovers	A	1–0	Cook 71'	10,655
28 February 2023	Gillingham	A	2–0	Smallwood 27', Cook 49'	6,273
4 March 2023	Colchester United	H	2–0	Cook 90+3', Banks 90+6'	20,383
7 March 2023	Walsall	A	0–0		4,951
11 March 2023	Newport County	A	1–1	Cook 36'	4,411
18 March 2023	Hartlepool United	H	2–2	Cook (2) 49', 78'	18,137
21 March 2023	Carlisle United	H	0–0		17,653
25 March 2023	Crewe Alexandra	A	Postponed		
1 April 2023	Grimsby Town	H	3–2	Gilliead 7', Walker 62', Cook 81'	19,011
7 April 2023	Crawley Town	A	0–0		3,644
10 April 2023	Sutton United	H	3–1	Banks 12', Chapman 63', Cook 71'	17,769
15 April 2023	Rochdale	A	3–0	Stubbs 5', Ebanks-Landell 74' (o.g.), Banks 82'	5,726
18 April 2023	Swindon Town	A	0–1		7,413
22 April 2023	Gillingham	H	2–2	Cook (2) 48', 84' (pen.)	18,501
29 April 2023	Northampton Town	A	2–1	Cook 30', Crichlow 90+4'	7,786
3 May 2023	Crewe Alexandra	A	2–3	Cook 46', Walker 55'	6,123
8 May 2023	Leyton Orient	H	1–1	Halliday 43'	22,756

=== League Two play-offs ===
Date	Round	Opponents	H / A	Result F–A	Scorers	Attendance
14 May 2023	Semi-final 1st leg	Carlisle United	H	1–0	Walker 18'	20,575
20 May 2023	Semi-final 2nd leg	Carlisle United	A	1–3	Derbyshire 106'	15,401

=== FA Cup ===
Bradford were drawn at home to Harrogate Town in the first round.

Win Draw Loss Fixtures

Date	Round	Opponents	H / A	Result F–A	Scorers	Attendance
5 November 2022	Round 1	Harrogate Town	H	0–1	—	6,837

=== EFL Cup ===
Win Draw Loss Fixtures

Bradford were drawn at home to Hull City in the first round and to Blackburn Rovers in the second round.

Date	Round	Opponents	H / A	Result F–A	Scorers	Attendance
9 August 2022	Round 1	Hull City	H	2–1	Cook (2) 39', 44'	5,394
23 August 2022	Round 2	Blackburn Rovers	H	1–2	Cook 18'	7,821

=== EFL Trophy ===
On 20 June, the initial Group stage draw was made, grouping Bradford City with Burton Albion and Sheffield Wednesday.

Pos	Div	Team	Pld	W	PW	PL	L	GF	GA	GD	Pts	Qualification
1	L1	Burton Albion	3	3	0	0	0	11	4	+7	9	Advance to Round 2
2	L2	Bradford City	3	1	0	1	1	5	7	−2	4	Advance to Round 2
3	L1	Sheffield Wednesday	3	1	0	0	2	5	6	−1	3	
4	ACA	Leicester City U21	3	0	1	0	2	4	8	−4	2	

Source: EFL.com

Win Draw Loss Fixtures

Date	Round	Opponents	H / A	Result F–A	Scorers	Attendance
30 August 2022	Group game 1	Sheffield Wednesday	H	3–1	Young (2) 36', 75', Harratt 83'	6,092
4 October 2022	Group game 2	Leicester City U21	H	2–2 (2–4(p.)	Oliver 11', Sutton 49'	2,564
18 October 2022	Group game 3	Burton Albion	A	0–4	—	549
22 November 2022	Second round	Salford City	A	0–1	—	578

== Squad statistics ==
No.	Pos.	Name	League		FA Cup		EFL Cup		EFL Trophy		Total		Discipline	
No.	Pos.	Name	Apps	Goals	Apps	Goals	Apps	Goals	Apps	Goals	Apps	Goals	Yellow card	Red card
1	GK	(England) Harry Lewis	39	0	1	0	2	0	4	0	46	0	2	0
2	DF	(England) Brad Halliday	40	1	1	0	2	0	2	0	43	0	10	1
3	DF	(England) Liam Ridehalgh	19	0	0	0	2	0	0	0	21	0	5	0
5	DF	(England) Matthew Platt	38	0	1	0	2	0	1(1)	0	42(1)	0	9	2
6	MF	(England) Richard Smallwood (c)	38	3	1	0	2	0	2	0	43	3	9	0
7	DF	(England) Tolaji Bola	2(1)	0	0	0	0	0	0	0	2(1)	0	0	0
8	MF	(Republic of Ireland) Emmanuel Osadebe	1(3)	0	0	0	0	0	0	0	1(3)	0	0	0
9	FW	(England) Andy Cook	33(8)	28	0(1)	0	2	3	0(1)	0	35(10)	31	5	0
10	FW	(Scotland) Jamie Walker	16(3)	4	0	0	0	0	0(1)	0	14(4)	3	6	1
11	MF	(England) Alex Gilliead	35	1	1	0	2	0	2(1)	0	40(1)	1	3	0
12	MF	(Scotland) Scott Banks	14(8)	4	0(1)	0	2	0	1(1)	0	17(10)	4	4	0
13	GK	(Republic of Ireland) Colin Doyle	0	0	0	0	0	0	0	0	0	0	0	0
15	DF	(England) Timi Odusina	4	0	0	0	0	0	3	0	7	0	0	0
16	MF	(England) Ryan East	5(10)	0	0(1)	0	0(2)	0	2(2)	0	7(15)	0	0	0
17	DF	(England) Luke Hendrie	1	0	0	0	0	0	3	0	4	0	1	0
19	FW	(England) Vadaine Oliver	8(21)	2	0(1)	0	0(2)	0	4	1	12(24)	3	1	0
20	MF	(England) Harry Chapman	25(4)	1	1	0	2	0	2	0	30(4)	1	5	0
23	FW	(England) Matt Derbyshire	3(2)	1	0	0	0	0	0	0	3(2)	1	0	0
24	DF	(England) Romoney Crichlow	22(5)	0	1	0	2	0	1(1)	0	26(6)	0	4	0
25	MF	(England) Kian Scales	0	0	0	0	0	0	0	0	0	0	0	0
26	FW	(England) Dion Pereira	8(6)	1	1	0	0	0	1(2)	0	10(8)	1	1	0
29	GK	(England) Heath Richardson	0	0	0	0	0	0	0	0	0	0	0	0
30	FW	(Sudan) Abo Eisa	8(5)	2	0(1)	0	0	0	0(1)	0	8(7)	2	0	0
33	FW	(Republic of Ireland) Dara Costelloe	8(2)	0	0	0	0	0	0	0	8(2)	0	2	0
34	FW	(England) Thierry Nevers	0(5)	0	0	0	0	0	0	0	0(5)	0	1	0
35	DF	(Republic of Ireland) Ciaran Kelly	0(3)	0	0	0	0	0	0	0	0(3)	0	1	0
36	DF	(England) Sam Stubbs	12	0	0	0	0	0	0	0	12	0	4	0
40	MF	(England) Adam Clayton	12	0	0	0	0	0	0	0	12	0	2	0
n/a	DF	(England) Bobby Pointon	0	0	0	0	0	0	0	0	0	0	0	0
Players out on loan for rest of the season
4	MF	(Cameroon) Yann Songo'o	2(12)	0	0	0	0(1)	0	4	0	6(13)	0	1	0
14	DF	(England) Matty Foulds	18	0	1	0	0	0	2	0	21	0	0	0
21	FW	(England) Jake Young	3(4)	2	0	0	1(1)	0	3	2	7(5)	4	2	0
22	DF	(England) Oscar Threlkeld	0	0	0	0	0	0	0	0	0	0	0	0
27	DF	(England) Finn Cousin-Dawson	0	0	0	0	0	0	0	0	0	0	0	0
28	FW	(England) Charlie Wood	0	0	0	0	0	0	0	0	0	0	0	0
Players left during the season
n/a	FW	(England) Lee Angol	5(9)	0	1	0	0(2)	0	1(2)	0	7(13)	0	5	0
n/a	FW	(England) Kian Harratt	0(5)	0	0	0	1	0	2(1)	1	3(6)	1	0	1
n/a	DF	(Republic of Ireland) Fiacre Kelleher	0	0	0	0	0	0	0	0	0	0	0	0
n/a	DF	(Republic of Ireland) Reece Staunton	0	0	0	0	0	0	0	0	0	0	0	0
n/a	MF	(England) Levi Sutton	4(13)	0	0	0	0(1)	0	3	1	7(14)	1	2	0
n/a	FW	(Republic of Ireland) Tyreik Wright	12(3)	4	1	0	0	0	1	0	14(3)	4	3	0
-	–	Own goals	–	1	–	0	–	0	–	0	–	1	–	–

As of 7 April 2023.

== Transfers ==
=== In ===
Date	Pos	Player	Transferred from	Fee	Ref
10 June 2022	RM	(Republic of Ireland) Emmanuel Osadebe	(England) Walsall	Undisclosed	
10 June 2022 (Note: The transfer was announced on 20 May, and would become official on 10 June once the transfer window opened)	CF	(England) Jake Young	(England) Forest Green Rovers	Undisclosed	
28 June 2022	CB	(England) Timi Odusina	(England) Hartlepool United	Undisclosed	
1 July 2022 (Note: The transfer was announced on 17 June, and would become official on July 1, once his Blackburn Rovers contract expired)	RW	(England) Harry Chapman	(England) Blackburn Rovers	Free transfer	
1 July 2022 (Note: The transfer was announced on 27 May, and would become official on July 1, once his Swindon Town contract expired)	DM	(England) Ryan East	(England) Swindon Town	Free transfer	
1 July 2022 (Note: The transfer was announced on 16 May, and would become official on July 1, once his Southampton contract expired)	GK	(England) Harry Lewis	(England) Southampton	Free transfer	
1 July 2022 (Note: The transfer was announced on 23 May, and would become official on July 1, once his Barrow contract expired)	CB	(England) Matthew Platt	(England) Barrow	Free transfer	
1 July 2022 (Note: The transfer was announced on 22 June, and would become official on July 1, once his Hull City contract expired)	CM	(England) Richard Smallwood	(England) Hull City	Free transfer	
1 July 2022 (Note: The transfer was announced on 8 May, and would become official on July 1, once his Heart of Midlothian contract expired)	LW	(Scotland) Jamie Walker	(Scotland) Heart of Midlothian	Free transfer	
10 July 2022	RB	(England) Brad Halliday	(England) Fleetwood Town	Free transfer	
10 July 2022	CF	(England) Vadaine Oliver	(England) Gillingham	Free transfer	
1 January 2023 (Note: The transfer was announced on 12 December, and would become official on 1 January, once his Bohemians contract expired)	CB	(Republic of Ireland) Ciaran Kelly	(Republic of Ireland) Bohemians	Free Transfer	
9 January 2023 (Note: The transfer was announced on 30 December, and would become official on 9 January, once his NorthEast United contract expired)	CF	(England) Matt Derbyshire	(India) NorthEast United	Free Transfer	
19 January 2023	CM	(England) Adam Clayton	(England) Doncaster Rovers	Free Transfer	
31 January 2023	CB	(England) Sam Stubbs	(England) Exeter City	Free Transfer	

=== Out ===
Date	Pos	Player	Transferred to	Fee	Ref
28 June 2022	GK	(England) Sam Hornby	(England) Colchester United	Undisclosed	
28 June 2022	CM	(Scotland) Elliot Watt	(England) Salford City	Undisclosed	
30 June 2022	CM	(England) Callum Cooke	(England) Hartlepool United	Released	
30 June 2022	RM	(England) Gareth Evans	(England) Radcliffe	Released	
30 June 2022	CF	(Northern Ireland) Caolan Lavery	(England) Scunthorpe United	Released	
30 June 2022 (Note: The transfer was announced on 13 June, and would become official once his contract expired)	CB	(Republic of Ireland) Paudie O'Connor	(England) Lincoln City	Free transfer	
30 June 2022	GK	(England) Richard O'Donnell	(England) Rochdale	Released	
30 June 2022	CF	(Jamaica) Theo Robinson	(England) Hartlepool United	Released	
30 June 2022	CM	(Poland) Olivier Sukiennicki	(Poland) Raków Częstochowa	Released	
30 June 2022 (Note: The transfer was announced on 17 June, and would become official once his contract expired)	LW	(England) Charles Vernam	(England) Lincoln City	Free transfer	
12 August 2022	CB	(Republic of Ireland) Reece Staunton	(England) Bradford (Park Avenue)	Undisclosed	
15 August 2022	RB	(England) Louie Chorlton	(England) Hull City	Undisclosed	
4 January 2023	CB	(Republic of Ireland) Fiacre Kelleher	(England) Colchester United	Undisclosed	
11 January 2023	CF	(England) Lee Angol	(England) Sutton United	Undisclosed	
31 January 2023	DM	(England) Levi Sutton	(England) Harrogate Town	Undisclosed	

=== Loans in ===
Date	Pos	Player	Loaned from	On loan until	Ref
10 June 2022 (Note: The loan agreement was announced on 2 June, and would become active on 10 June, once the transfer window opened)	CF	(England) Kian Harratt	(England) Huddersfield Town	4 November 2022 (Note: On 4 November, Harratt returned to his parent club, Huddersfield Town with immediate effect.)	
21 June 2022	CB	(England) Romoney Crichlow	(England) Huddersfield Town	End of Season	
8 August 2022	RW	(Scotland) Scott Banks	(England) Crystal Palace	End of Season	
19 August 2022	GK	(Republic of Ireland) Joe O'Shaughnessy	(England) Wolverhampton Wanderers	End of Season	
1 September 2022	LW	(England) Dion Pereira	(England) Luton Town	End of Season	
1 September 2022	RW	(Republic of Ireland) Tyreik Wright	(England) Aston Villa	9 January 2023 (Note: On 9 January, Wright was recalled to Aston Villa)	
10 January 2023	LW	(England) Thierry Nevers	(England) West Ham United	End of Season	
13 January 2023	LW	(Republic of Ireland) Dara Costelloe	(England) Burnley	End of Season	
16 January 2023	LB	(England) Tolaji Bola	(England) Rotherham United	End of Season	

=== Loans out ===
Date	Pos	Player	Loaned to	On loan until	Ref
12 July 2022	CB	(Republic of Ireland) Fiacre Kelleher	(England) Solihull Moors	3 January 2023 (Note: On 3 January, Kelleher was recalled from his loan at Solihull)	
29 July 2022	RB	(Northern Ireland) Finn Cousin-Dawson	(England) Spennymoor Town	4 January 2023 (Note: On 4 January, Cousin-Dawson was recalled from his loan at Spennymoor)	
29 July 2022	CM	(England) Charlie Wood	(England) Guiseley	3 January 2023	
15 August 2022	AM	(England) Kian Scales	(England) Farsley Celtic	1 January 2023 (Note: On 30 August, Scales' loan at Farsley Celtic was extended)	
25 August 2022	RB	(England) Oscar Threlkeld	(England) Oldham Athletic	1 January 2023	
14 January 2023	CF	(England) Jake Young	(England) Barrow	End of Season	
17 January 2023	LB	(England) Matty Foulds	(England) Harrogate Town	End of Season	
26 January 2023	DM	(Cameroon) Yann Songo'o	(England) Walsall	End of Season	
10 March 2023	MF	(England) Harvey Rowe	(England) Guiseley	End of Season	
21 March 2023	CF	(England) Dylan Youmbi	(England) Marske United	End of Season	
