= 2021–22 Bradford City A.F.C. season =

Bradford City
2021–22 season
- Chairman: Stefan Rupp
- Manager: Derek Adams (until 15 February); Mark Hughes (from 24 February)
- Stadium: Utilita Energy Stadium
- League Two: 14th
- FA Cup: First round
- EFL Cup: First round
- EFL Trophy: Group Stage
- Top goalscorer: League: Andy Cook (12); All: Andy Cook (12)
- Highest home attendance: 18,283 vs. Carlisle United
Home colours	Away colours	Third colours

The 2021–22 season is Bradford City's 119th year in existence and third consecutive season in League Two. Along with the league, the club will also compete in the FA Cup, the EFL Cup and the EFL Trophy. The season covers the period from 1 July 2021 to 30 June 2022.

During pre-season, Derek Adams was appointed as Bantams new manager.

== Pre-season friendlies ==
Bradford City revealed they would have pre-season friendlies against Bradford (Park Avenue), Eccleshill United, Doncaster Rovers, Guiseley, Brighouse Town, Blackburn Rovers, Chesterfield and Accrington Stanley as part of their preparations for the new season.

Date	Opponents	H / A	Result F–A	Scorers	Attendance
13 July 2021	Bradford Park Avenue	A	5–0	Kelleher 6', Cook 63', Scales 71', Crankshaw 78' (pen.), Eisa 87'	1,106
14 July 2021	Eccleshill United	A	P–P		
17 July 2021	Doncaster Rovers	H	2–0	Eisa 10' (pen.), Cook 55'	1,000+
20 July 2021	Guiseley	A	2–1	Angol (2) 35', 38' (pen.)	
21 July 2021	Brighouse Town	A	3–1	Crankshaw 20', Evans 34', Scales 36'	
24 July 2021	Blackburn Rovers	H	2–0	Angol 19', Cooke 58'	
27 July 2021	Chesterfield	A	1–2	O'Connor 48'	
31 July 2021	Accrington Stanley	A	2–0	Cook (2) 4', 21’	1,097

== Competitions ==
=== League Two ===
==== League table ====
Pos	Team	Pld	W	D	L	GF	GA	GD	Pts
11	Newport County	46	19	12	15	67	58	+9	69
12	Crawley Town	46	17	10	19	56	66	−10	61
13	Leyton Orient	46	14	16	16	62	47	+15	58
14	Bradford City	46	14	16	16	53	55	−2	58
15	Colchester United	46	14	13	19	48	60	−12	55
16	Walsall	46	14	12	20	47	60	−13	54
17	Hartlepool United	46	14	12	20	44	64	−20	54

Source: EFL Official Website
Rules for classification: 1) Points; 2) Goal difference; 3) Number of goals scored; 4) Head-to-head results; 5) Wins; 6) Away goals; 7) Penalty points (sec 9.5); 8) 12-point sending off offences

==== Results summary ====
Overall								Home						Away					
Pld	W	D	L	GF	GA	GD	Pts	W	D	L	GF	GA	GD	W	D	L	GF	GA	GD
46	14	16	16	53	55	−2	58	6	10	7	29	29	0	8	6	9	24	26	−2

Last updated: 7 May 2022.

==== Results by matchday ====
Matchday	1	2	3	4	5	6	7	8	9	10	11	12	13	14	15	16	17	18	19	20	21	22	23	24	25	26	27	28	29	30	31	32	33	34	35	36	37	38	39	40	41	42	43	44	45	46
Ground	A	H	H	A	A	H	A	H	A	H	A	H	H	A	H	A	H	A	A	H	H	A	A	H	A	A	H	H	A	A	H	A	H	H	H	A	A	H	H	A	A	H	A	H	A	H
Result	D	W	W	W	L	D	L	D	L	W	D	D	L	W	D	D	D	L	D	D	D	W	L	W	D	W	L	D	L	W	L	L	L	L	L	W	W	L	D	L	D	D	L	W	W	W
Position	12	6	2	2	3	3	6	9	12	8	12	10	12	11	12	11	10	12	12	13	14	12	14	10	12	11	11	11	12	11	11	13	14	15	15	15	13	15	14	15	15	16	18	16	14	14

Updated to match(es) played on 7 May 2022. Source: Statto.com
A = Away; H = Home; W = Win; D = Draw; L = Loss

==== Matches ====
The Bantams' fixtures were released on 24 June 2021.

Date	Opponents	H / A	Result F–A	Scorers	Attendance
7 August 2021	Exeter City	A	0–0	—	5,609
14 August 2021	Oldham Athletic	H	2–1	Angol (2) 32', 90+8' (pen.)	17,624
17 August 2021	Stevenage	H	4–1	Cook (3) 1', 30', 38', Canavan 88'	14,257
21 August 2021	Mansfield Town	A	3–2	O'Connor 19', Vernam 61', Cook 87'	6,058
28 August 2021	Leyton Orient	A	0–2	—	4,901
4 September 2021	Walsall	H	1–1	Watt 14'	15,822
11 September 2021	Salford City	A	0–1	—	2,863
18 September 2021	Barrow	H	1–1	Vernam 59'	15,403
25 September 2021	Crawley Town	A	1–2	Cooke 81'	2,435
2 October 2021	Rochdale	H	2–0	Gilliead 37', Cook 75' (pen.)	15,809
9 October 2021	Newport County	A	0–0	—	4,089
16 October 2021	Bristol Rovers	H	2–2	Vernam 42', Cook 50'	16,664
19 October 2021	Hartlepool United	H	1–3	O'Connor 72'	14,334
23 October 2021	Swindon Town	A	3–1	Lavery 16', Sutton 40', Robinson 75'	9,461
30 October 2021	Forest Green Rovers	H	1–1	Cook 10'	14,873
13 November 2021	Port Vale	A	1–1	Angol 74'	7,010
20 November 2021	Northampton Town	H	1–1	Vernam 67'	15,372
23 November 2021	Tranmere Rovers	A	1–2	Sutton 26'	5,962
27 November 2021	Scunthorpe United	A	1–1	Songo'o 68'	3,823
8 December 2021	Colchester United	H	0–0	—	14,658
11 December 2021	Sutton United	H	2–2	Robinson 34', Angol 81'	14,658
1 January 2022	Barrow	A	2–1	Angol 8', Cook 49'	3,463
8 January 2022	Carlisle United	A	0–2	—	4,996
15 January 2022	Salford City	H	2–1	Watson 57' (o.g.), O'Connor 85'	14,671
22 January 2022	Rochdale	A	0–0	—	4,941
25 January 2022	Walsall	A	2–1	Daly 37', Cook 88' (pen.)	4,097
29 January 2022	Crawley Town	H	1–2	Cook 31'	14,623
1 February 2022	Leyton Orient	H	1–1	Watt 83'	13,646
5 February 2022	Harrogate Town	A	0–2	—	2,778
8 February 2022	Stevenage	A	1–0	Walker 55'	1,953
12 February 2022	Exeter City	H	0–1	—	15,058
19 February 2022	Oldham Athletic	A	0–2	—	7,716
22 February 2022	Harrogate Town	H	1–3	Foulds 12'	14,512
26 February 2022	Mansfield Town	H	0–2		16,797
5 March 2022	Swindon Town	H	1–2	Evans 18'	15,008
12 March 2022	Forest Green Rovers	A	2–0	Cooke 64', Cook 90+5'	3,339
15 March 2022	Hartlepool United	A	2–0	Foulds 70', Songo'o 76'	5,106
19 March 2022	Port Vale	H	1–2	Vernam 70'	16,046
26 March 2022	Newport County	H	0–0	—	14,716
2 April 2022	Bristol Rovers	A	1–2	Pereira 46'	9,186
9 April 2022	Northampton Town	A	0–0	—	5,548
15 April 2022	Tranmere Rovers	H	1–1	Walker 19'	17,257
18 April 2022	Colchester United	A	3–0	-	2,893
23 April 2022	Scunthorpe United	H	2–1	Walker 1', Vernam 5'	15,248
30 April 2022	Sutton United	A	4–1	Vernam (2) 16', 77', Songo'o 85', Cook 90+7'	4,010
7 May 2022	Carlisle United	H	2–0	Angol 13', Walker 69'	18,283

=== FA Cup ===
Bradford City were drawn at home to Exeter City in the first round.

Date	Round	Opponents	H / A	Result F–A	Scorers	Attendance
6 November 2021	Round 1	Exeter City	H	1–1	Robinson 28'	3,236
16 November 2021	Round 1 replay	Exeter City	A	0–3 (a.e.t.) Void	—	3,509
30 November 2021	Round 1 replay	Exeter City	A	1–2	Angol 11'	3,228

=== EFL Cup ===
Bradford City were drawn away to Nottingham Forest in the first round.

Date	Round	Opponents	H / A	Result F–A	Scorers	Attendance
11 August 2021	Round 1	Nottingham Forest	A	1–2	Cooke 54'	9,514

=== EFL Trophy ===
Group game fixture dates were announced on 22 July.

Pos	Div	Team	Pld	W	PW	PL	L	GF	GA	GD	Pts	Qualification
1	L1	Sunderland	3	2	0	1	0	5	3	+2	7	Advance to Round 2
2	L1	Lincoln City	3	2	0	0	1	7	4	+3	6	Advance to Round 2
3	ACA	Manchester United U21	3	1	0	0	2	6	5	+1	3	
4	L2	Bradford City	3	0	1	0	2	1	7	−6	2	

Source: EFL.com

Date	Round	Opponents	H / A	Result F–A	Scorers	Attendance
31 August 2021	Group game 1	Lincoln City	H	0–3	—	—
21 September 2021	Group game 2	Manchester United U21	H	0–3	—	2,022
9 November 2021	Group game 3	Sunderland	A	1–1 (4–2 p)	Robinson 36'	—

== Squad statistics ==
No.	Pos.	Name	League		FA Cup		EFL Cup		EFL Trophy		Total		Discipline	
No.	Pos.	Name	Apps	Goals	Apps	Goals	Apps	Goals	Apps	Goals	Apps	Goals	Yellow card	Red card
1	GK	(England) Richard O'Donnell	19	0	3	0	1	0	0	0	23	0	2	0
2	DF	(England) Oscar Threlkeld	22	0	3	0	0	0	2(1)	0	27(1)	0	6	0
3	DF	(England) Liam Ridehalgh	28(1)	0	1	0	1	0	1	0	31(1)	0	3	0
4	DF	(Republic of Ireland) Paudie O'Connor	45	3	3	0	1	0	1	0	50	3	12	2
6	MF	(Cameroon) Yann Songo'o	39(2)	3	3	0	0	0	1	0	43(2)	3	6	0
7	FW	(Sudan) Abo Eisa	1(3)	0	0(1)	0	0(1)	0	0	0	1(5)	0	0	0
8	MF	(England) Callum Cooke	28(14)	2	1(2)	0	1	1	2	0	32(16)	3	7	0
9	FW	(England) Andy Cook	35(4)	12	0	0	1	0	1(1)	0	37(5)	12	0	0
10	FW	(Scotland) Jamie Walker	14(5)	4	0	0	0	0	0	0	14(5)	4	5	0
11	MF	(England) Alex Gilliead	38(5)	1	3	0	1	0	2(1)	0	44(6)	1	3	0
12	GK	(England) Alex Bass	21	0	0	0	0	0	0	0	21	0	1	0
14	DF	(England) Matty Foulds	18(5)	2	2(1)	0	0	0	2(1)	0	22(7)	2	1	0
15	MF	(England) Charles Vernam	19(9)	8	2	0	0(1)	0	2(1)	0	23(11)	8	0	0
16	DF	(Republic of Ireland) Fiacre Kelleher	6(3)	0	0(1)	0	0	0	2	0	8(4)	0	1	0
17	MF	(England) Gareth Evans	13(7)	1	0(2)	0	0	0	3	0	16(9)	1	1	0
18	MF	(Scotland) Elliot Watt	41	2	3	0	1	0	1(1)	0	46(1)	2	13	1
19	FW	(England) Lee Angol	14(4)	6	1(2)	1	1	0	1	0	17(6)	7	4	1
20	FW	(England) Theo Robinson	5(18)	2	2(1)	1	0	0	1	1	8(19)	4	1	0
21	DF	(Republic of Ireland) Reece Staunton	1	0	0	0	0	0	2	0	3	0	0	0
22	MF	(England) Levi Sutton	23(9)	2	3	0	1	0	1(2)	0	28(11)	2	5	0
23	FW	(England) Tom Elliott	2(5)	0	0	0	0	0	0	0	2(5)	0	0	0
24	DF	(England) Finn Cousin-Dawson	8(3)	0	0(1)	0	1	0	1	0	10(4)	0	4	0
25	MF	(England) Matty Daly	8(1)	1	0	0	0	0	0	0	8(1)	1	0	0
26	MF	(England) Kian Scales	0(2)	0	0	0	0	0	2	0	2(2)	0	1	0
27	DF	(England) Luke Hendrie	16	0	0	0	0	0	0	0	16	0	4	0
28	FW	(England) Dion Pereira	9(1)	1	0	0	0	0	0	0	9(1)	1	0	0
29	FW	(Northern Ireland) Caolan Lavery	5(14)	1	0	0	0	0	0(1)	0	5(15)	1	2	0
30	FW	(England) Nathan Delfouneso	4(2)	0	0	0	0	0	0	0	4(2)	0	0	0
33	FW	(England) Charlie Wood	0	0	0	0	0	0	0	0	0	0	0	0
34	MF	(Poland) Olivier Sukiennicki	0	0	0	0	0	0	0	0	0	0	0	0
Players out on loan for rest of the season
-	GK	(England) Sam Hornby	6	0	0	0	0	0	3	0	9	0	0	0
Players left during the season
-	DF	(Republic of Ireland) Niall Canavan	17	1	3	0	1	0	0	0	21	1	2	1
-	MF	(England) Ollie Crankshaw	0(6)	0	0	0	0(1)	0	1	0	1(7)	0	0	0
-	DF	(Poland) Jorge Sikora	0	0	0	0	0	0	1	0	1	0	0	0

As of 7 May 2022.

== Transfers ==
=== Transfers in ===
Date	Position	Nationality	Name	From	Fee	Ref.
1 July 2021	CF	(England)	Lee Angol	(England) Leyton Orient	Free transfer	
1 July 2021	CF	(England)	Andy Cook	(England) Mansfield Town	Free transfer	
1 July 2021	LW	(England)	Abo Eisa	(England) Scunthorpe United	Free transfer	
1 July 2021	RW	(England)	Alex Gilliead	(England) Scunthorpe United	Free transfer	
1 July 2021	CB	(Republic of Ireland)	Fiacre Kelleher	(Wales) Wrexham	Free transfer	
1 July 2021	LB	(England)	Liam Ridehalgh	(England) Tranmere Rovers	Free transfer	
1 July 2021	DM	(Cameroon)	Yann Songo'o	(England) Morecambe	Free transfer	
1 July 2021	RB	(England)	Oscar Threlkeld	(England) Salford City	Free transfer	
2 August 2021	CF	(Northern Ireland)	Caolan Lavery	(England) Walsall	Free transfer	
31 August 2021	CF	(Jamaica)	Theo Robinson	(England) Port Vale	Free transfer	
31 January 2022	RB	(England)	Luke Hendrie	(England) Hartlepool United	Free transfer	

=== Loans in ===
Date from	Position	Nationality	Name	From	Date until	Ref.
4 January 2022	LW	(England)	Dion Pereira	(England) Luton Town	End of season	
11 January 2022	LW	(Scotland)	Jamie Walker	(Scotland) Heart of Midlothian	End of season	
18 January 2022	AM	(England)	Matty Daly	(England) Huddersfield Town	End of season	
24 January 2022	GK	(England)	Alex Bass	(England) Portsmouth	End of season	
27 January 2022	CF	(England)	Tom Elliott	(England) Salford City	End of season	
31 January 2022	CF	(England)	Nathan Delfouneso	(England) Bolton Wanderers	End of season	

=== Loans out ===
Date from	Position	Nationality	Name	To	Date until	Ref.
12 November 2021	CB	(Republic of Ireland)	Reece Staunton	(England) Bradford (Park Avenue)	10 December 2021	
31 January 2022	GK	(England)	Sam Hornby	(England) Colchester United	End of season	

=== Transfers out ===
Date	Position	Nationality	Name	To	Fee	Ref.
15 May 2021	GK	(England)	Tom Donaghy	(England) Fleetwood Town	Undisclosed	
30 June 2021	SS	(Republic of Ireland)	Billy Clarke	Retired	—N/a	
30 June 2021	CF	(Jamaica)	Clayton Donaldson	(England) York City	Released	
30 June 2021	GK	(England)	Will Huffer	(England) Stalybridge Celtic	Released	
30 June 2021	RM	(England)	Zeli Ismail	(England) Hereford	Released	
30 June 2021	CF	(England)	Lee Novak	Retired	—N/a	
30 June 2021	RB	(Republic of Ireland)	Anthony O'Connor	(England) Morecambe	Released	
30 June 2021	LM	(England)	Harry Pritchard	(England) Eastleigh	Released	
30 June 2021	AM	(England)	Connor Shanks	(England) Huddersfield Town	Released	
30 June 2021	LB	(England)	Connor Wood	(England) Leyton Orient	Released	
28 September 2021	RW	(England)	Ollie Crankshaw	(England) Stockport County	Undisclosed	
17 January 2022	CB	(England)	Jorge Sikora	Free agent	Mutual consent	
31 January 2022	CB	(Republic of Ireland)	Niall Canavan	(England) Barrow	Undisclosed	
