= Levi Sutton =

English footballer

Personal information
- Full name: Jack Levi Sutton
- Date of birth: 24 March 1997 (age 29)
- Place of birth: Scunthorpe, England
- Height: 1.80 m (5 ft 11 in)
- Positions: Defender; midfielder

Team information
- Current team: Boston United
- Number: 16

Youth career
- Bottesford Town
- Scunthorpe United

Senior career*
Years	Team	Apps	(Gls)
2015–2020	Scunthorpe United	58	(1)
2016–2017	→ North Ferriby United (loan)	6	(0)
2018	→ Harrogate Town (loan)	3	(0)
2020–2023	Bradford City	83	(4)
2023–2026	Harrogate Town	98	(2)
2026–	Boston United	0	(0)
- * Club domestic league appearances and goals as of 13:04, 24 September 2026 (UTC)

Jack Levi Sutton (born 24 March 1997) is an English professional footballer who plays as a defender or midfielder for National League club Boston United.

== Club career ==
Sutton came through the ranks at Bottesford Town and Scunthorpe United, he signed his first pro contract with Scunthorpe on 2 June 2015. Although, his first three involvements with the Scunthorpe first-team matchday squad came during September 2014 when he was an unused substitute in games against Chesterfield, Coventry City and Leyton Orient. Sutton made his Scunthorpe league debut on 28 March 2016 in a 6–0 home victory over Swindon Town. After four further appearances in all competitions for Scunthorpe, Sutton departed in November to join National League side North Ferriby United on loan for a month.

He made his debut on 26 November in a loss to Solihull Moors. After five appearances in all competitions for North Ferriby, Sutton extended his loan with the club on 30 December 2016 until the end of the 2016–17 season. However, Scunthorpe recalled Sutton on 9 January 2017. He signed a new two-year contract with Scunthorpe in September 2017. After breaking into Scunthorpe's first-team, Sutton transitioned from a central midfielder to a right-back. On 31 August 2018, Sutton was loaned to National League outfit Harrogate Town for three months. He was recalled a month later. Sutton scored his first senior goal on 5 January 2019 versus Coventry City.

His contract was extended by twelve months by Scunthorpe at the end of the 2018–19 season. On 11 July 2020, Sutton joined EFL League Two side Bradford City on a free transfer. His first appearance came in an EFL Trophy penalty shoot-out defeat to Doncaster Rovers on 8 September, while his league debut came on 26 September against Stevenage; he was unable to make his League Two bow earlier due to a suspension that carried over from his time with Scunthorpe.

He was one of seven players offered a new contract by Bradford City at the end of the 2021–22 season. He signed for Harrogate town in January 2023 and was released in the summer of 2026.

In September 2026, Sutton joined National League club Boston United.

== International career ==
Internationally, Sutton was approached by the FAW at a young age to play for Wales.

== Personal life ==
Sutton was born at Scunthorpe General Hospital in 1996. He has three sisters and four brothers, his great grandfather is Italian. Sutton visited Gunness School nursery, prior to attending Messingham Primary School and Frederick Gough Secondary School. He supports Manchester United, but his favourite footballer growing up was Zinedine Zidane.

== Career statistics ==
As of end of 2025–26 season.

Club statistics
Club	Season	League			Cup		League Cup		Other		Total	
Club	Season	Division	Apps	Goals	Apps	Goals	Apps	Goals	Apps	Goals	Apps	Goals
Scunthorpe United	2014–15	League One	0	0	0	0	0	0	0	0	0	0
Scunthorpe United	2015–16	League One	1	0	0	0	0	0	0	0	1	0
Scunthorpe United	2016–17	League One	8	0	0	0	0	0	3 (Note: Appearance(s) in EFL Trophy)	0	11	0
Scunthorpe United	2017–18	League One	15	0	0	0	1	0	2	0	18	0
Scunthorpe United	2018–19	League One	18	1	0	0	0	0	1	0	19	1
Scunthorpe United	2019–20	League Two	16	0	0	0	0	0	3	0	19	0
Scunthorpe United	Total		58	1	0	0	1	0	9	0	68	1
North Ferriby United (loan)	2016–17	National League	6	0	—		—		1 (Note: Appearance in FA Trophy)	0	7	0
Harrogate Town (loan)	2018–19	National League	3	0	0	0	—		0	0	3	0
Bradford City	2020–21	League Two	34	2	0	0	0	0	2	0	36	2
Bradford City	2021–22	League Two	32	2	2	0	1	0	3	0	38	2
Bradford City	2022–23	League Two	17	0	0	0	1	0	3	1	21	1
Bradford City	Total		83	4	2	0	2	0	8	1	95	5
Harrogate Town	2022–23	League Two	17	1	0	0	0	0	0	0	17	1
Harrogate Town	2023–24	League Two	39	1	2	0	2	0	0	0	43	1
Harrogate Town	2024–25	League Two	27	0	2	0	2	0	3	0	34	0
Harrogate Town	2025–26	League Two	15	0	0	0	0	0	4	0	19	0
Harrogate Town	Total		98	2	4	0	4	0	7	0	113	2
Career total			238	7	6	0	7	0	25	1	286	8
