= 2019–20 Bradford City A.F.C. season =

Bradford City
2019–20 season
- Chairman: Stefan Rupp
- Manager: Gary Bowyer (until 3 February); Stuart McCall (from 4 February)
- Stadium: Valley Parade
- League Two: 9th (on PPG)
- FA Cup: First Round
- EFL Cup: First Round
- EFL Trophy: Group Stage
- Top goalscorer: League: James Vaughan (11); All: James Vaughan (11)
- Highest home attendance: 17,668 vs. Grimsby Town FC (League Two)
- Lowest home attendance: 868 vs. Manchester City U21s (EFL Trophy)
Home colours	Away colours	Third colours

The 2019–20 season is Bradford City's 117th season in their history and the first season back in EFL League Two following the club's relegation the season before. Along with League Two, the club will also participate in the FA Cup, EFL Cup and EFL Trophy.

The season covers the period from 1 July 2019 to 30 June 2020.

== Pre-season ==
On 23 May 2019 it was announced that the Bantams would face local city rivals Bradford Park Avenue. Following this announcement, Bradford City arranged a further two friendlies to be played against Rochdale A.F.C. and Brighouse Town F.C. A home game was added to the pre-season schedule on 20 July where City would face Wigan Athletic. Another local friendly was announce as Eccleshill United F.C. would host the Bantams. Bolton Wanderers had three of their friendlies cancelled leading Bradford to agree to play a Behind closed doors friendly against them.

Date	Opponents	H / A	Result F–A	Scorers	Attendance
6 July 2019	Guiseley	A	2–0	Donaldson 33', Fawns 55'	1,799
9 July 2019	Brighouse Town	A	2–0	Hippolyte (2) 20' (pen.), 70'	n/a
14 July 2019	Liverpool	H	1–3	Doyle 81' (pen.)	24,343
16 July 2019	Eccleshill United	A	2–1	Mooney 55', Okafor 81'	650
20 July 2019	Wigan Athletic	H	1–1	Vaughan 36' (pen.)	n/a
23 July 2019	Bolton Wanderers	A	1–2 (Note: The match between Bolton Wanderers and Bradford City in Bolton was played behind closed doors.)	Vaughan (pen.)	0
23 July 2019	Bradford Park Avenue	A	0–0 (3–2 p)		1,171
27 July 2019	Rochdale	A	1–0 (Note: The match between Rochdale A.F.C. and Bradford City in Rochdale was abandoned at halftime due to a waterlogged pitch.)	Doyle 38' (pen.)	n/a

== Competitions ==
=== League Two ===
==== League table ====
Pos	Team	Pld	W	D	L	GF	GA	GD	Pts	PPG	Promotion, qualification or relegation
5	Exeter City	37	18	11	8	53	43	+10	65	1.76	Qualification for League Two play-offs (Note: Four teams play for one spot and promotion to EFL League One.)
6	Colchester United	37	15	13	9	52	37	+15	58	1.57	Qualification for League Two play-offs
7	Northampton Town (O, P)	37	17	7	13	54	40	+14	58	1.57	Qualification for League Two play-offs
8	Port Vale	37	14	15	8	50	44	+6	57	1.54	
9	Bradford City	37	14	12	11	44	40	+4	54	1.46	
10	Forest Green Rovers	36	13	10	13	43	40	+3	49	1.36	
11	Salford City	37	13	11	13	49	46	+3	50	1.35	
12	Walsall	36	13	8	15	40	49	−9	47	1.31	
13	Crawley Town	37	11	15	11	51	47	+4	48	1.30	

Source: EFL Official Website
Rules for classification: 1) Points per game; 2) Goal difference; 3) Number of goals scored; 4) Head-to-head results; 5) Wins; 6) Away goals; 7) Penalty points (sec 9.5); 8) 12-point sending off offences
(O) Play-off winners; (P) Promoted

==== Result summary ====
Overall								Home						Away					
Pld	W	D	L	GF	GA	GD	Pts	W	D	L	GF	GA	GD	W	D	L	GF	GA	GD
37	14	12	11	44	40	+4	54	11	5	2	30	16	+14	3	7	9	14	24	−10

Last updated: 7 March 2020.
Source: Statto.com

==== Results by matchday ====
Matchday	1	2	3	4	5	6	7	8	9	10	11	12	13	14	15	16	17	18	19	20	21	22	23	24	25	26	27	28	29	30	31	32	33	34	35	36	37
Ground	H	A	H	A	H	A	H	A	A	H	A	H	A	H	H	H	A	A	H	A	H	A	H	H	A	A	H	A	A	H	A	H	H	A	A	H	A
Result	D	D	W	W	L	L	W	W	L	W	D	W	W	W	L	W	L	D	W	D	D	D	W	W	D	L	D	D	L	D	L	D	W	L	L	W	L
Position	14	17	7	2	9	12	10	7	9	6	8	6	3	2	4	2	7	7	6	5	5	5	4	4	4	6	5	5	7	7	8	8	8	9	9	9	9

Updated to match(es) played on 7 March 2020. Source: Statto.com
A = Away; H = Home; W = Win; D = Draw; L = Loss

==== Matches ====
On Thursday, 20 June 2019, the EFL League Two fixtures were revealed.

Date	Opponents	H / A	Result F–A	Scorers	Attendance	Position
3 August 2019	Cambridge United	H	0–0		14,810	14th
10 August 2019	Grimsby Town	A	1–1	Vaughan 53'	6,882	17th
17 August 2019	Oldham Athletic	H	3–0	Vaughan 4', Donaldson 32', Scannell 72'	14,447	7th
20 August 2019	Stevenage	A	1–0	Soares 42' (o.g.)	2,833	2nd
24 August 2019	Forest Green Rovers	H	0–1		13,504	9th
31 August 2019	Crewe Alexandra	A	1–2	Vaughan 32'	4,459	12th
7 September 2019	Northampton Town	H	2–1	Donaldson 77', P. O'Connor 88'	13,678	10th
14 September 2019	Walsall	A	1–0	Kinsella 83' (o.g.)	4,649	7th
17 September 2019	Cheltenham Town	A	2–3	Anderson 51', Richards-Everton 76'	2,702	9th
21 September 2019	Carlisle United	H	3–1	Pritchard 30', Mellor 40', Ismail 90+5'	2,702	6th
28 September 2019	Scunthorpe United	A	1–1	P. O'Connor 56'	4,554	8th
5 October 2019	Swindon Town	H	2–1	Akpan 69', McCartan 79'	14,136	6th
12 October 2019	Morecambe	A	2–1	Akpan 47', Oteh 78'	3,899	3rd
19 October 2019	Crawley Town	H	2–1	Pritchard 18', Devine 49'	13,813	2nd
22 October 2019	Port Vale	H	1–2	Vaughan 45+1' (pen.)	14,345	4th
26 October 2019	Macclesfield Town	A	P–P (Note: The match between Macclesfield Town F.C. and Bradford City A.F.C. at Moss Rose was postponed due to a waterlogged pitch.)			
2 November 2019	Exeter City	H	2–0	Oteh 31', Vaughan 45+1'	14,002	2nd
16 November 2019	Colchester United	A	P–P (Note: The match between Colchester United F.C. and Bradford City A.F.C. at Colchester Community Stadium was postponed due to international call ups.)			
23 November 2019	Plymouth Argyle	A	1–2	Canavan 51' (o.g.)	9,645	7th
30 November 2019	Macclesfield Town	A	1–1	Vaughan 73'	2,751	7th
7 December 2019	Newport County	H	1–0	Vaughan 58' (pen.)	14,016	6th
14 December 2019	Leyton Orient	A	0–0		6,015	5th
21 December 2019	Salford City	H	1–1	Pritchard 53'	14,642	5th
26 December 2019	Carlisle United	A	0–0		6,039	5th
29 December 2019	Mansfield Town	H	2–0	Vaughan (2) 13' (pen.), 83' (pen.)	15,197	4th
1 January 2020	Morecambe	H	1–0	Oteh 80'	14,111	4th
4 January 2020	Swindon Town	A	1–1	McCartan 89'	8,407	4th
11 January 2020	Crawley Town	A	1–2	Vaughan 84'	2,361	6th
18 January 2020	Scunthorpe United	H	2–2	Akpan 17', Vaughan 19'	14,176	5th
21 January 2020	Colchester United	A	0–0		3,022	5th
25 January 2020	Mansfield Town	A	0–3		5,537	7th
28 January 2020	Cheltenham Town	H	1–1	Donaldson 11' (pen.)	12,731	7th
1 February 2020	Oldham Athletic	A	0–3		5,198	8th
8 February 2020	Grimsby Town	H	1–1	Novak 80'	17,668	8th
11 February 2020	Stevenage	H	3–1	McCartan (2) 49', 54', Novak 90+3'	12,845	8th
15 February 2020	Cambridge United	A	1–2	Reeves 17'	4,541	9th
22 February 2020	Newport County	A	1–2	Donaldson 26'	3,439	9th
29 February 2020	Plymouth Argyle	H	2–1	Richards-Everton 6', Connolly 45+2'	13,439	9th
7 March 2020	Salford City	A	0–2		3,443	9th
14 March 2020	Leyton Orient	H	S–S (Note: The match between Bradford City A.F.C. and Leyton Orient was suspended due to the EFL suspending the rest of the season due to COVID-19.)			
17 March 2020	Port Vale	A	S–S (Note: The match between Port Vale and Bradford City A.F.C. was suspended due to the EFL suspending the rest of the season due to COVID-19.)			
21 March 2020	Macclesfield Town	H	S–S (Note: The match between Bradford City A.F.C. and Macclesfield Town was suspended due to the EFL suspending the rest of the season due to COVID-19.)			
28 March 2020	Exeter City	A	S–S (Note: The match between Exeter City and Bradford City A.F.C. was suspended due to the EFL suspending the rest of the season due to COVID-19.)			
4 April 2020	Colchester United	H	S–S (Note: The match between Bradford City A.F.C. and Colchester United was suspended due to the EFL suspending the rest of the season due to COVID-19.)			
10 April 2020	Forest Green Rovers	A	S–S (Note: The match between Forest Green Rovers and Bradford City A.F.C. was suspended due to the EFL suspending the rest of the season due to COVID-19.)			
13 April 2020	Crewe Alexandra	H	S–S (Note: The match between Bradford City A.F.C. and Crewe Alexandra was suspended due to the EFL suspending the rest of the season due to COVID-19.)			
18 April 2020	Northampton Town	A	S–S (Note: The match between Northampton Town and Bradford City A.F.C. was suspended due to the EFL suspending the rest of the season due to COVID-19.)			
25 April 2020	Walsall	H	S–S (Note: The match between Bradford City A.F.C. and Walsall was suspended due to the EFL suspending the rest of the season due to COVID-19.)			

=== FA Cup ===
The first round draw was made on 21 October 2019.

Date	Round	Opponents	H / A	Result F–A	Scorers	Attendance
9 November 2019	First Round	Shrewsbury Town	A	1–1	Oteh 19'	3,764
19 November 2019	First Round Replay	Shrewsbury Town	H	0–1		3,888

=== EFL Cup ===
The first round draw was made on 20 June.

Date	Round	Opponents	H / A	Result F–A	Scorers	Attendance
13 August 2019	Round 1	Preston North End	H	0–4		3,456

=== EFL Trophy ===
On 9 July 2019, the pre-determined group stage draw was announced with Invited clubs to be drawn on 12 July 2019.

Pos	Div	Team	Pld	W	PW	PL	L	GF	GA	GD	Pts	Qualification
1	ACA	Manchester City U21	3	2	0	0	1	5	4	+1	6	Advance to Round 2
2	L1	Bolton Wanderers	3	1	0	2	0	5	3	+2	5	Advance to Round 2
3	L1	Rochdale	3	1	1	0	1	3	4	−1	5	
4	L2	Bradford City	3	0	1	0	2	3	5	−2	2	

Source: EFL.com

Date	Round	Opponents	H / A	Result F–A	Scorers	Attendance
3 September 2019	Group Stage	Bolton Wanderers	A	1–1 (4–3 p)	P. O'Connor 51'	9,062
24 September 2019	Group Stage	Manchester City U21's	H	1–2	Akpan 21'	868
12 November 2019	Group Stage	Rochdale	H	1–2	French 15'	761

== Squad statistics ==
No.	Pos.	Name	League		FA Cup		EFL Cup		EFL Trophy		Total		Discipline	
No.	Pos.	Name	Apps	Goals	Apps	Goals	Apps	Goals	Apps	Goals	Apps	Goals	Yellow card	Red card
1	GK	(England) Richard O'Donnell	33	0	2	0	0	0	0	0	35	0	0	0
2	DF	(England) Kelvin Mellor	22(3)	1	0(2)	0	0	0	1	0	23(5)	1	5	0
4	DF	(Republic of Ireland) Paudie O'Connor	16(3)	2	0(1)	0	1	0	2	1	19(4)	3	7	0
5	DF	(England) Ben Richards-Everton	32	2	2	0	0	0	2(1)	0	36(1)	2	4	1
6	DF	(Republic of Ireland) Anthony O'Connor	34(2)	0	2	0	1	0	0	0	37(2)	0	1	0
7	MF	(England) Harry Pritchard	14(7)	3	1	0	0	0	1	0	16(7)	3	1	0
8	MF	(England) Jake Reeves	17(1)	1	0	0	0	0	1	0	18(1)	1	6	0
9	FW	(England) Lee Novak	6	2	0	0	0	0	0	0	6	2	0	0
10	FW	(Jamaica) Clayton Donaldson	18(2)	4	0	0	0	0	1	0	19(2)	4	3	0
11	MF	(England) Zeli Ismail	6(5)	1	1(1)	0	0	0	2(1)	0	9(7)	1	3	1
14	FW	(Northern Ireland) Shay McCartan	8(13)	4	0	0	0	0	1	0	9(13)	4	5	0
16	MF	(England) Matt Palmer	17(1)	0	0	0	0	0	0	0	17(1)	0	0	0
17	FW	(England) Jordan Gibson	3(3)	0	0	0	0	0	1	0	4(3)	0	0	0
18	MF	(England) Jermaine Anderson	3(2)	1	0(1)	0	1	0	2	0	6(3)	1	2	0
19	MF	(Republic of Ireland) Dylan Connolly	22(5)	1	2	0	0	0	0	0	24(5)	1	4	0
20	MF	(Scotland) Glenn Middleton	2(1)	0	0	0	0	0	0	0	2(1)	0	0	0
21	MF	(Nigeria) Hope Akpan	13(6)	3	2	0	1	0	1	1	17(6)	4	4	0
22	DF	(Wales) Adam Henley	22(2)	0	2	0	0	0	1	0	25(2)	0	2	0
23	DF	(England) Connor Wood	35	0	2	0	1	0	0(1)	0	38(1)	0	2	0
24	MF	(England) Daniel Devine	6(7)	1	1(1)	0	1	0	2(1)	0	10(9)	1	2	0
25	FW	(Jersey) Kurtis Guthrie	1(1)	0	0	0	0	0	0	0	1(1)	0	0	0
26	MF	(England) Callum Cooke	18(7)	0	1	0	0	0	1	0	20(7)	0	6	1
27	MF	(Republic of Ireland) Jamie Devitt	3(2)	0	0	0	0	0	1	0	4(2)	0	2	1
28	DF	(England) Joe Riley	0	0	0	0	0	0	0	0	0	0	0	0
29	MF	(England) Chris Taylor	9(5)	0	0	0	0	0	0(1)	0	9(6)	0	1	0
30	GK	(England) George Sykes-Kenworthy	0	0	0	0	0	0	2	0	2	0	0	0
31	GK	(England) Luke McGee	4	0	0	0	0	0	0	0	4	0	0	0
32	MF	(England) Dylan Mottley-Henry	4(3)	0	0	0	0	0	0	0	4(3)	0	0	0
35	DF	(England) Reece Staunton	0	0	0	0	0	0	0(1)	0	0(1)	0	0	0
36	DF	(England) Jorge Sikora	0	0	0	0	0	0	0(1)	0	0(1)	0	0	0
37	FW	(England) Connor Morris	0	0	0	0	0	0	0(1)	0	0(1)	0	0	0
-	MF	(England) Eliot Goldthorp	0	0	0	0	0	0	0	0	0	0	0	0
-	–	Own goals	–	3	–	0	–	0	–	0	–	3	–	–
Players out on loan for rest of the season
-	DF	(England) Tyler French	0(2)	0	0	0	1	0	3	1	4(2)	1	0	0
-	GK	(England) Sam Hornby	0	0	0	0	1	0	1	0	2	0	0	0
-	DF	(Scotland) Jackson Longridge	0(1)	0	0	0	1	0	3	0	4(1)	0	2	0
-	FW	(England) James Vaughan	23(2)	11	2	0	0	0	0	0	25(2)	11	10	0
Players left during the season
-	MF	(England) Luca Colville	0	0	0	0	0(1)	0	0	0	0(1)	0	0	0
-	DF	(England) Finn Cousin-Dawson	0	0	0	0	0	0	0	0	0	0	0	0
-	FW	(Republic of Ireland) Eoin Doyle	6	0	0	0	1	0	0	0	7	0	0	0
-	MF	(England) Raecce Ellington	0	0	0	0	0	0	0	0	0	0	0	0
-	FW	(England) Aramide Oteh	8(10)	3	2	1	0	0	2	0	12(10)	4	3	0
-	FW	(England) Omari Patrick	0(2)	0	0	0	0(1)	0	2(1)	0	2(4)	0	0	0
-	MF	(England) Tyrell Robinson	0	0	0	0	0	0	0	0	0	0	0	0
-	MF	(Republic of Ireland) Sean Scannell	2(3)	1	0	0	1	0	0	0	3(3)	1	0	0

Statistics accurate as of 25 April 2020

== Transfers ==
=== Transfers in ===
Date	Position	Nationality	Name	From	Fee	Ref.
1 July 2019	CF	(Jamaica)	Clayton Donaldson	(England) Bolton Wanderers	Free transfer	
1 July 2019	CB	(England)	Tyler French	(England) AFC Sudbury	Undisclosed	
1 July 2019	RB	(Wales)	Adam Henley	(United States) Real Salt Lake	Free transfer	
1 July 2019	GK	(England)	Sam Hornby	(England) Port Vale	Free transfer	
1 July 2019	RM	(England)	Zeli Ismail	(England) Walsall	Free transfer	
1 July 2019	LB	(Scotland)	Jackson Longridge	(Scotland) Dunfermline Athletic	Undisclosed	
1 July 2019	CB	(Republic of Ireland)	Paudie O'Connor	(England) Leeds United	Undisclosed	
1 July 2019	CB	(England)	Ben Richards-Everton	(England) Accrington Stanley	Free transfer	
1 July 2019	CF	(England)	James Vaughan	(England) Wigan Athletic	Free transfer	
30 August 2019	RM	(England)	Harry Pritchard	(England) Blackpool	Free transfer	
11 November 2019	MF	(England)	Chris Taylor	(England) Blackpool	Free transfer	
30 January 2020	RM	(England)	Dylan Mottley-Henry	(England) Barnsley	Undisclosed	
31 January 2020	CF	(England)	Kurtis Guthrie	(England) Stevenage	Undisclosed	
31 January 2020	CF	(England)	Lee Novak	(England) Scunthorpe United	Undisclosed	

=== Loans in ===
Date from	Position	Nationality	Name	From	Date until	Ref.
5 July 2019	CM	(England)	Matt Palmer	(England) Rotherham United	31 January 2020	
22 August 2019	AM	(England)	Callum Cooke	(England) Peterborough United	30 June 2020	
23 August 2019	AM	(Republic of Ireland)	Jamie Devitt	(England) Blackpool	30 June 2020	
2 September 2019	ST	(England)	Aramide Oteh	(England) Queens Park Rangers	30 June 2020	
2 September 2019	AM	(Republic of Ireland)	Dylan Connolly	(England) AFC Wimbledon	30 June 2020	
16 January 2020	GK	(England)	Luke McGee	(England) Portsmouth	30 June 2020	
1 February 2020	LW	(Scotland)	Glenn Middleton	(Scotland) Rangers	30 June 2020	

=== Loans out ===
Date from	Position	Nationality	Name	To	Date until	Ref.
26 July 2019	GK	(England)	George Sykes-Kenworthy	(England) Guiseley	3 September 2019	
16 August 2019	CF	(Republic of Ireland)	Eoin Doyle	(England) Swindon Town	January 2020	
3 October 2019	MF	(England)	Eliot Goldthorp	(England) Mossley	November 2019	
7 October 2019	GK	(England)	Sam Hornby	(England) AFC Fylde	30 June 2020	
21 November 2019	CF	(England)	Omari Patrick	(Wales) Wrexham	January 2020	
10 January 2020	LB	(Scotland)	Jackson Longridge	(England) Torquay United	30 June 2020	
29 January 2020	CF	(England)	James Vaughan	(England) Tranmere Rovers	30 June 2020	
21 February 2020	CB	(England)	Tyler French	(England) AFC Fylde	30 June 2020	

=== Transfers out ===
Date	Position	Nationality	Name	To	Fee	Ref.
1 July 2019	RB	(Scotland)	Paul Caddis	(England) Swindon Town	Released	
1 July 2019	LB	(Zimbabwe)	Adam Chicksen	(England) Bolton Wanderers	Released	
1 July 2019	CF	(England)	Tom Clare	(England) Boston United	Released	
1 July 2019	AM	(Republic of Ireland)	Billy Clarke	(England) Plymouth Argyle	Released	
1 July 2019	CM	(Scotland)	Callum Gunner	(England) Chippenham Town	Released	
1 July 2019	MF	(England)	Cameron Hawkes	Free agent	Released	
1 July 2019	CF	(England)	Alex Jones	(Scotland) Partick Thistle	Released	
1 July 2019	CB	(England)	Nathaniel Knight-Percival	(England) Carlisle United	Released	
1 July 2019	CB	(Australia)	Ryan McGowan	(Australia) Sydney	Released	
1 July 2019	GK	(England)	Ben Wilson	(England) Coventry City	Released	
1 July 2019	RB	(England)	Calum Woods	(England) Tranmere Rovers	Released	
1 July 2019	CM	(England)	Josh Wright	(England) Leyton Orient	Free transfer	
30 July 2019	FW	(England)	Kielen Adams	(England) Oldham Athletic	Free transfer	
23 August 2019	RW	(England)	Luca Colville	(Scotland) Greenock Morton	Undisclosed	
30 August 2019	RW	(Republic of Ireland)	Sean Scannell	(England) Blackpool	Free transfer	
9 November 2019	CF	(England)	Raecce Ellington	(England) Brighouse Town	Free transfer	
15 November 2019	DF	(England)	Finn Cousin-Dawson	(England) Brighouse Town	Free transfer	
30 January 2020	CF	(Republic of Ireland)	Eoin Doyle	(England) Swindon Town	Undisclosed	
31 January 2020	CF	(England)	Omari Patrick	(England) Carlisle United	Undisclosed	
24 February 2020	LB	(England)	Tyrell Robinson	Free agent	Sacked	
