= Jorge Sikora =

English footballer

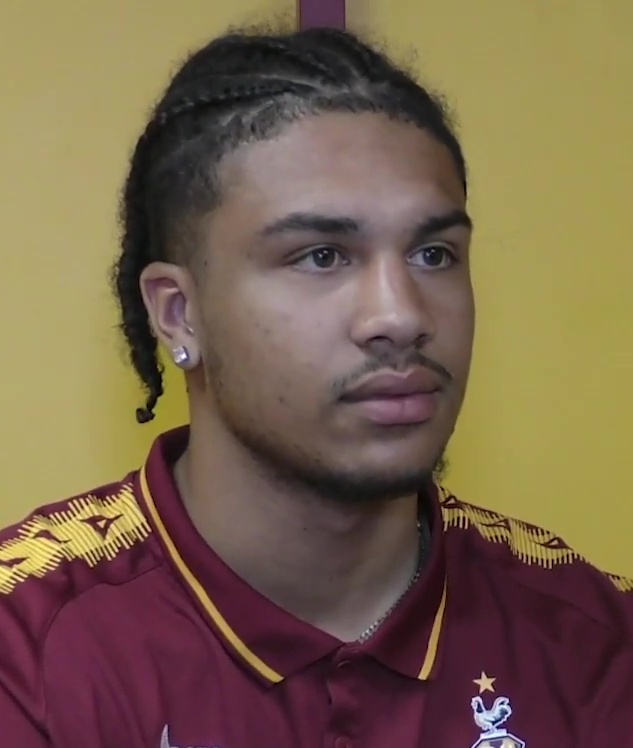
- Sikora in 2021

Personal information
- Full name: Jorge Jack Antoni Sikora
- Date of birth: 29 March 2002 (age 24)
- Place of birth: Bradford, England
- Position: Defender

Team information
- Current team: Silsden

Youth career
- 2014–2019: Bradford City

Senior career*
Years	Team	Apps	(Gls)
2019–2022	Bradford City	1	(0)
2019	→ Ossett United (loan)	3	(0)
2019–2020	→ F.C. United of Manchester (loan)	1	(0)
2021	→ Spennymoor Town (loan)	7	(0)
2022	F.C. United of Manchester	3	(0)
2022	Guiseley	8	(0)
2022–2023	Marske United	3	(0)
2023	Sheffield	8	(0)
2023–2024	Marske United	3	(0)
2023	→ Brighouse Town (loan)	3	(0)
2024–2025	Brighouse Town	13	(0)
2025–	Silsden	16	(2)
- * Club domestic league appearances and goals as of 00:59, 28 November 2025 (UTC)

Jorge Jack Antoni Sikora (born 29 March 2002) is an English professional footballer who plays as a defender for Silsden.

== Club career ==
After playing for their youth team, joining at under-13 level, he made his senior debut for Bradford City on 24 September 2019, in the EFL Trophy. After spending time with Ossett United, he moved on loan to F.C. United of Manchester in December 2019, before being recalled by Bradford City in January 2020. He turned professional in July 2020, signing a one-year contract.

On 12 May 2021, he was one of four players offered a new contract by Bradford City. He signed a new one-year contract on 14 June 2021. He was made available for loan to National League clubs in September 2021.

He moved on loan to Spennymoor Town in October 2021. The loan was extended for a second month in November 2021.

Sikora left Bradford City by mutual consent in January 2022. He then joined up with former loan club F.C. United of Manchester. In June 2022 he moved to Guiseley, making one friendly and 12 competitive appearances for the club.

On 11 November 2022, Sikora joined Marske United for an undisclosed fee. He then moved to Sheffield in the second half of the 2022–23 season. He returned to Marske United for the 2023–24 season.

In July 2025 he signed for Silsden.

== International career ==
In December 2018 Sikora met with Polish representatives about representing them.

== Career statistics ==
As of 27 December 2021

Appearances and goals by club, season and competition
Club	Season	League			FA Cup		League Cup		Other		Total	
Club	Season	Division	Apps	Goals	Apps	Goals	Apps	Goals	Apps	Goals	Apps	Goals
Bradford City	2019–20	League Two	0	0	0	0	0	0	1 (Note: Appearance(s) in the Football League Trophy.)	0	1	0
Bradford City	2020–21	League Two	1	0	0	0	0	0	3	0	4	0
Bradford City	2021–22	League Two	0	0	0	0	0	0	1	0	1	0
Bradford City	Total		1	0	0	0	0	0	5	0	6	0
Ossett United (loan)	2019–20	Northern Premier League Division One North West	3	0	0	0	0	0	2 (Note: Appearances in the FA Trophy.)	0	5	0
F.C. United of Manchester (loan)	2019–20	Northern Premier League Premier Division	1	0	0	0	0	0	0	0	1	0
Spennymoor Town (loan)	2021–22	National League North	7	0	0	0	0	0	0	0	7	0
Career total			12	0	0	0	0	0	7	0	19	0
