= Raeece Ellington =

English footballer

Personal information
- Full name: Raeece Abdul-Haq Ellington
- Date of birth: 26 June 2001 (age 25)
- Place of birth: Leeds, England
- Positions: Midfielder; forward

Team information
- Current team: Tadcaster Albion

Youth career
- Bradford City

Senior career*
Years	Team	Apps	(Gls)
2018–2019	Bradford City	0	(0)
- Brighouse Town
2021	Stockport Town		
2021–2022	1874 Northwich	2	(0)
2022–????	Silsden		
- Albion Sports
2023	Steeton		
2023–2024	Krško Posavje		
2024–	Tadcaster Albion	7	(0)
- * Club domestic league appearances and goals as of 18:07, 24 March 2024 (UTC)

Raeece Abdul-Haq Ellington (born 26 June 2001) is an English footballer who plays as a midfielder and forward for Tadcaster Albion.

== Club career ==
Born in Leeds, Ellington started his career at Bradford City, where he made his senior debut on 9 October 2018, in the EFL Trophy. He then played for Brighouse Town.

In 2021 he played for Stockport Town whilst studying. He then played for 1874 Northwich. He signed for Silsden in July 2022.

After playing with Albion Sports, he signed for Steeton in January 2023. He re-signed with the club for the 2023–24 season, leaving the club in September 2023.

He then played in Slovenia with Krško Posavje, before returning to England with Tadcaster Albion.

== International career ==
In July 2022 he was selected to represent the Kashmir FA.
