= Connor Wood (footballer) =

English footballer (born 1996)

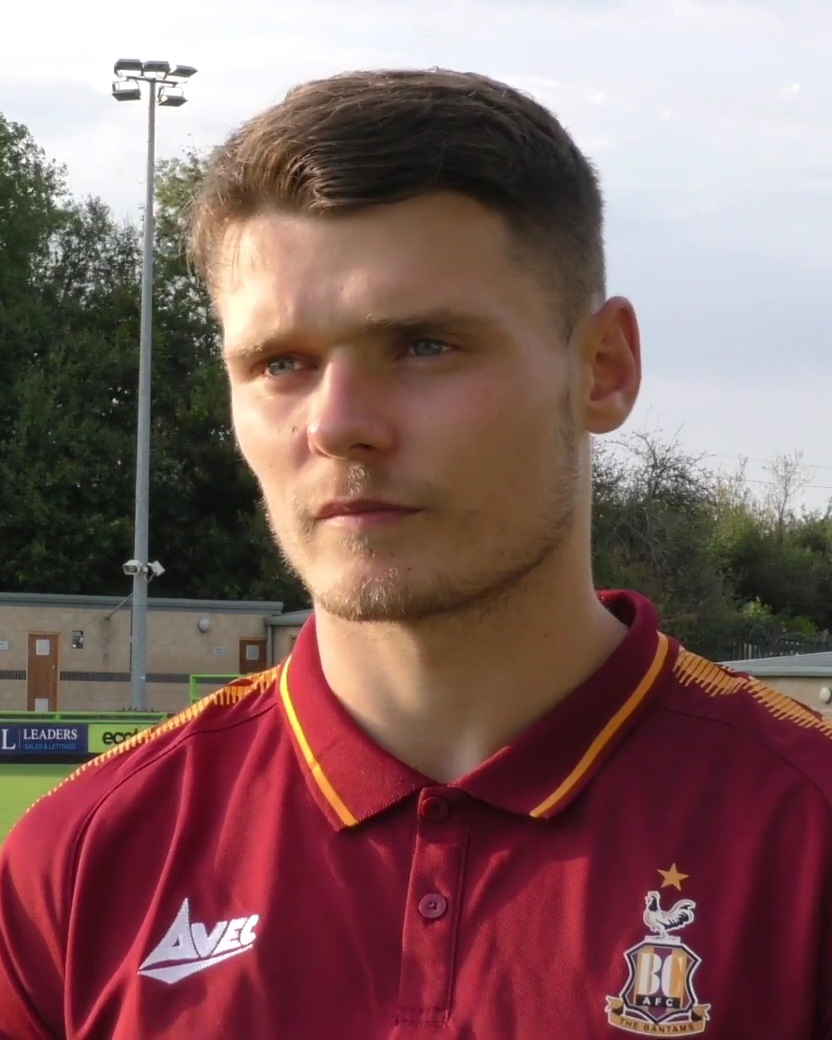
- Wood with Bradford City in September 2020

Personal information
- Full name: Connor Oliver Wood
- Date of birth: 17 July 1996 (age 30)
- Place of birth: Harlow, England
- Height: 5 ft 10 in (1.77 m)
- Positions: Left back; left winger

Team information
- Current team: Peterborough Sports
- Number: 32

Youth career
- Buckhurst Hill
- 2015–2016: Nike Academy

Senior career*
Years	Team	Apps	(Gls)
2013–2014	Soham Town Rangers	42	(0)
2014–2015	Chesham United	31	(0)
2016–2018	Leicester City	0	(0)
2018–2021	Bradford City	103	(2)
2021–2023	Leyton Orient	32	(0)
2023	→ Colchester United (loan)	16	(0)
2023–2025	Tranmere Rovers	63	(0)
2025–	Peterborough Sports	31	(0)
- * Club domestic league appearances and goals as of 14:31, 26 June 2026 (UTC)

Connor Oliver Wood (born 17 July 1996) is an English professional footballer who plays as a left back and left winger for Southern League Premier Division Central club Peterborough Sports.

== Career ==
=== Early career ===
Wood was born in Harlow, playing youth football for Essex-based non-league club Buckhurst Hill.

He then played for Soham Town Rangers, Chesham United, Nike Academy and Leicester City.

=== Bradford City ===
Wood signed a three-year contract with Bradford City in June 2018. He stated he joined the club due to their youth policy.

He made his senior debut on 1 September 2018 and scored his first goal on 1 January 2019, in his first first-team game since November 2018. Later that month he spoke about the club's improved form. He began the 2019–20 season in a more attacking role, and in October 2019 he spoke about the change in the club's mentality, including his determination that the club would 'bounce back' following their first defeat after a run of three victories. In November 2019 he was praised by manager Gary Bowyer, and later that month Wood spoke about the club's recent lack of form.

In February 2020, after captain James Vaughan left the club on loan, Wood said he would still speak to Vaughan for advice.

By 18 February 2021 Wood had made 61 successive league starts for Bradford City, including playing every minute in the club's 2020–21 season to date. Later that month he praised the maturity and detail of City's interim managers Mark Trueman and Conor Sellars.

On 12 May 2021 he was one of nine players that Bradford City announced would leave the club on 30 June 2021 when their contracts expire.

=== Leyton Orient ===
On 16 June 2021 it was announced that Wood would sign for Leyton Orient after the expiry of his contract with Bradford City. In August 2021 Wood was dropped from the Leyton Orient first team, ending a run of 83 consecutive league games. He moved on loan to Colchester United in January 2023.

=== Tranmere Rovers ===
On 8 September 2023, Wood signed for Tranmere Rovers. At the end of the 2023–24 season, he signed a new one-year contract extension.

On 6 May 2025, the club announced the player would be released in June when his contract expired.

=== Peterborough Sports ===
On 18 October 2025, Wood joined National League North club Peterborough Sports.

== Playing style ==
Primarily a left back, in January 2019 he began to be used further up the field (as a left winger, a position he had some experience of from earlier in his career. He made his first appearance of the 2019–20 season on the left of the front three, and continued in a new attacking role for future games. In December 2019 he spoke out about being encouraged by manager Gary Bowyer to be more vocal on the pitch. In January 2020 he spoke about playing regularly.

== Career statistics ==
As of 3 May 2025

Appearances and goals by club, season and competition
Club	Season	League			FA Cup		League Cup		Other		Total	
Club	Season	Division	Apps	Goals	Apps	Goals	Apps	Goals	Apps	Goals	Apps	Goals
Soham Town Rangers	2013–14	Isthmian League	42	0	1	0	0	0	7	2	50	2
Chesham United	2014–15	Southern Football League	31	0	0	0	0	0	6	1	37	1
Leicester City	2016–17	Premier League	0	0	0	0	0	0	0	0	0	0
Leicester City	2017–18	Premier League	0	0	0	0	0	0	0	0	0	0
Leicester City	Total		0	0	0	0	0	0	0	0	0	0
Bradford City	2018–19	League One	22	1	2	0	0	0	2 (Note: Appearance(s) in the Football League Trophy.)	0	26	1
Bradford City	2019–20	League Two	35	0	2	0	1	0	1	0	39	0
Bradford City	2020–21	League Two	46	1	2	1	2	0	0	0	49	2
Bradford City	Total		103	2	6	1	3	0	3	0	115	3
Leyton Orient	2021–22	League Two	32	0	1	0	1	0	2	0	36	0
Leyton Orient	2022–23	League Two	0	0	0	0	2	0	1	0	2	0
Leyton Orient	Total		32	0	1	0	2	0	3	0	38	0
Colchester United (loan)	2022–23	League Two	16	0	0	0	0	0	0	0	16	0
Tranmere Rovers	2023–24	League Two	29	0	0	0	0	0	0	0	29	0
Tranmere Rovers	2024–25	League Two	34	0	1	0	2	0	3	0	40	0
Tranmere Rovers	Total		63	0	1	0	2	0	3	0	69	0
Peterborough Sports	2025–26	National League South	31	0	0	0	0	0	1 (Note: Appearance in the FA Trophy)	1	32	1
Career total			318	2	9	1	7	0	23	4	356	7
