= Callum Cooke =

British association football player

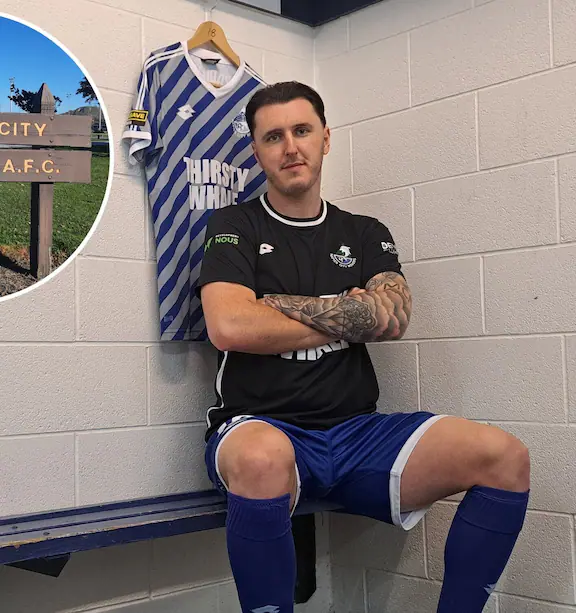
- Cooke signed for Napier City Rovers

Personal information
- Full name: Callum James Cooke
- Date of birth: 21 February 1997 (age 29)
- Place of birth: Peterlee, England
- Height: 1.72 m (5 ft 7 1/2 in)
- Position: Midfielder

Team information
- Current team: Napier City Rovers
- Number: 7

Youth career
- –2015: Middlesbrough

Senior career*
Years	Team	Apps	(Gls)
2015–2018	Middlesbrough	0	(0)
2017	→ Crewe Alexandra (loan)	18	(4)
2017–2018	→ Blackpool (loan)	30	(2)
2018–2020	Peterborough United	13	(1)
2019–2020	→ Bradford City (loan)	25	(0)
2020–2022	Bradford City	76	(5)
2022–2024	Hartlepool United	68	(9)
2025	Morecambe	18	(1)
2026–	Napier City Rovers	14	(6)

International career
2012–2013	England U16	4	(2)
2013–2014	England U17	18	(2)
2014	England U18	3	(0)
- * Club domestic league appearances and goals as of 04:51, 30 July 2026 (UTC)

Callum James Cooke (born 21 February 1997) is an English professional footballer who plays as an attacking midfielder for New Zealand National League club Napier City Rovers.

Born in Peterlee, Cooke started his career with Middlesbrough, signing his first professional contract in June 2014. After loan spells with Crewe Alexandra and Blackpool, Cooke left Middlesbrough permanently in 2018 to sign with Peterborough United. Cooke spent a loan spell with Bradford City before moving there permanently in 2020. After two seasons with Bradford, he returned to the North East, signing for Hartlepool United in 2022. Cooke left Hartlepool in June 2024 but did not sign for another club until January 2025 when he moved to Morecambe on a short-term deal. He left Morecambe at the end of the 2024–25 season following the expiration of his contract.

He has also represented England at youth level, up until U18 level.

== Career ==
=== Middlesbrough ===
Cooke began his career with Middlesbrough's Academy and he signed a professional contract with the club in June 2014. He played for Middlesbrough U23s in two EFL Trophy ties in 2016, scoring one goal.

In January 2017 Cooke joined League Two side Crewe Alexandra on loan. He made his professional debut on 4 February 2017 in a 4–0 defeat away at Exeter City, then scored on his home debut in a 5–0 win over Grimsby Town on 11 February. On 9 May 2017, Crewe announced that Cooke would be returning to his parent club.

On 18 July 2017, Cooke joined League One club Blackpool on loan until the end of the season.

=== Peterborough United ===
On 30 July 2018, Cooke signed for League One side Peterborough United on a two-year deal for an undisclosed fee.

He was transfer-listed by Peterborough United at the end of the 2018–19 season. He moved on loan to Bradford City in August 2019 for the 2019–20 season. His loan expired on 1 May 2020. Cooke left Peterborough at the end of the 2019–20 season following the expiration of his contract. In total, Cooke played 20 times for The Posh in all competitions, scoring once.

=== Bradford City ===
He returned to Bradford City in July 2020, signing a permanent two-year contract. He made his first appearance as a permanent Bradford player was in an EFL Cup defeat against Bolton Wanderers on 5 September 2020. In November 2020, Cooke scored his first goal for the Bantams in a 3–0 home win against Southend United. In the 2020–21 season, Cooke made 38 appearances in all competitions for Bradford scoring three times. Cooke was released by the club at the end of the 2021–22 season. Including his loan spell with Bradford, Cooke made a total of 112 appearances in all competitions and scored six times for the club.

=== Hartlepool United ===
On 6 July 2022, following his departure from Bradford, Cooke decided to join League Two side Hartlepool United on a two-year deal. Cooke scored his first Hartlepool goal in a 3–1 win against Harrogate Town in the FA Cup. He scored his first league goal on Boxing Day in 2022 which was a late 25-yard free kick in a 2–1 win at Rochdale.

In September 2023, it was announced that Cooke would be ruled out for several months due to an ankle injury sustained in training. However, he returned to the Hartlepool side sooner than expected in November 2023 and was praised by Pools manager John Askey upon his return to the side. Cooke provided all three assists in a 3–1 away win against York City early in his return to action. He was released by Hartlepool United at the end of the 2023–24 season having made 76 appearances in his two seasons with the club, scoring 11 times.

=== Morecambe ===
On 15 January 2025, Cooke signed a six-month contract with League Two club Morecambe. At the end of the 2024–25 season, following Morecambe's relegation, Cooke's contract was not renewed.

In January 2026, still without a club, Cooke began training with his former side Hartlepool in order to regain fitness. Pools boss Nicky Featherstone told the local press: "He's wanting to go abroad, so it was just a case of helping him get fit, nothing more than that."

=== Napier City Rovers ===
In March 2026, Cooke joined New Zealand Central League club Napier City Rovers.

== Career statistics ==
As of 26 July 2026

Appearances and goals by club, season and competition
Club	Season	League			Cup (Note: Includes appearances in FA Cup and Chatham Cup)		League Cup		Other		Total	
Club	Season	Division	Apps	Goals	Apps	Goals	Apps	Goals	Apps	Goals	Apps	Goals
Middlesbrough	2015–16	Championship	0	0	0	0	0	0	—		0	0
Middlesbrough	2016–17	Premier League	0	0	0	0	0	0	—		0	0
Middlesbrough	2017–18	Championship	0	0	—		—		—		0	0
Middlesbrough	Total		0	0	0	0	0	0	—		0	0
Middlesbrough U23	2016–17	—			—		—		2 (Note: Appearance(s) in EFL Trophy)	1	2	1
Crewe Alexandra (loan)	2016–17	League Two	18	4	—		—		—		18	4
Blackpool (loan)	2017–18	League One	30	2	1	0	0	0	3	0	34	2
Peterborough United	2018–19	League One	13	1	1	0	1	0	5	0	20	1
Bradford City (loan)	2019–20	League Two	25	0	1	0	0	0	1	0	27	0
Bradford City	2020–21	League Two	34	3	2	0	2	0	0	0	38	3
Bradford City	2021–22	League Two	42	2	2	0	1	1	2	0	47	3
Bradford City	Total		76	5	4	0	3	1	3	0	85	6
Hartlepool United	2022–23	League Two	34	4	4	1	1	0	1	0	40	5
Hartlepool United	2023–24	National League	35	5	0	0	0	0	1 (Note: Appearance in FA Trophy)	1	36	6
Hartlepool United	Total		69	9	4	1	1	0	2	1	76	11
Morecambe	2024–25	League Two	18	1	0	0	0	0	0	0	18	1
Napier City Rovers	2026	National League	14	6	4	1	—		—		18	7
Career total			263	28	15	2	5	1	15	2	298	33

== Honours ==
Napier City Rovers

- Central League: 2026

Individual

- Central League MVP: 2026
