= Mark Trueman =

English association football manager and former player

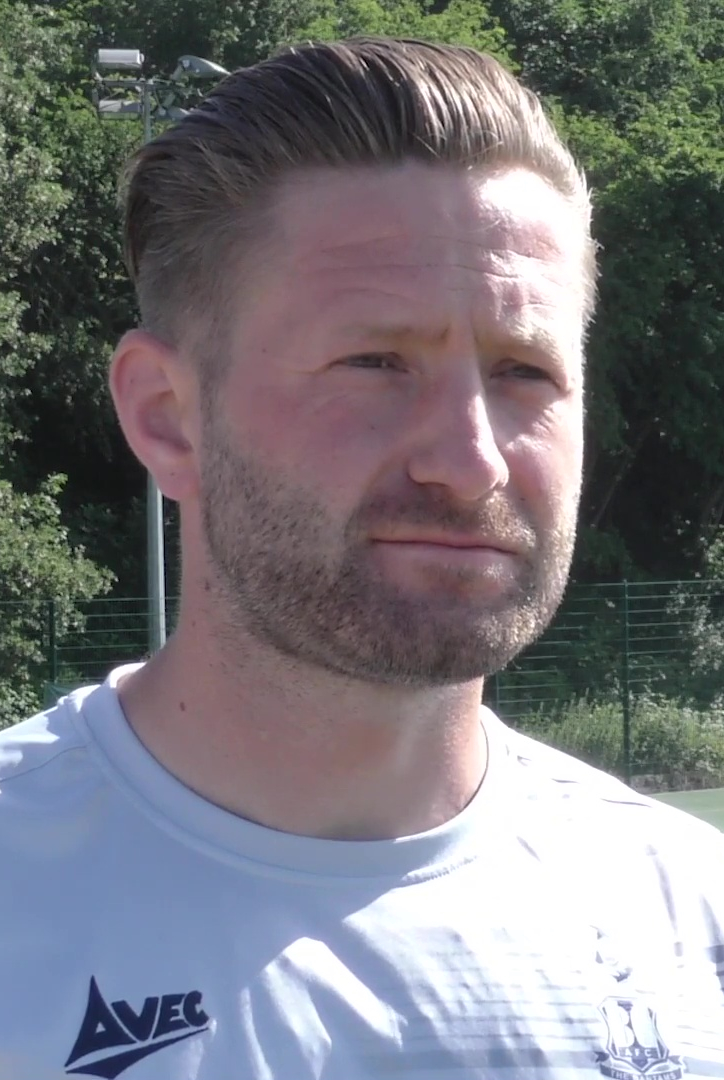
- Trueman with Bradford City in 2021

Personal information
- Date of birth: 7 February 1988 (age 38)
- Place of birth: Bradford, England
- Position: Midfielder

Team information
- Current team: Bradford City (coach)

Youth career
- Bradford City

Senior career*
Years	Team	Apps	(Gls)
- Ossett Town
2007	Guiseley		
2013	Ossett Albion		
- Harrogate Railway Athletic
- Thackley
- Brighouse Town
- Eccleshill United
2017–2018	Silsden		
- Thackley
- Silsden
2020	Thackley		

Managerial career
- 2020–2021: Bradford City (joint caretaker manager)
- 2021: Bradford City (joint manager)
- 2022: Bradford City (caretaker manager)
- 2023: Bradford City (caretaker manager)
- 2026: Bradford City (joint caretaker manager)
- * Club domestic league appearances and goals

Mark Trueman (born 7 February 1988) is an English football coach and former player who is a coach at Bradford City.

== Early life ==
Trueman was born in Bradford, West Yorkshire.

== Playing career ==
Trueman played youth football for Bradford City, and in non-league football as a midfielder for Ossett Town, Guiseley, Ossett Albion, Harrogate Railway Athletic, Thackley, Brighouse Town and Eccleshill United.

He played for Guiseley in 2007, and Ossett Albion in 2013.

He later played for Silsden, leaving the club in February 2018 to return to Thackley. He later returned to Silsden, before again returning to Thackley in October 2020.

== Coaching career ==
Trueman worked as a youth coach at FC Halifax Town. He later worked for Bradford City as under-18 team manager, before being appointed caretaker manager alongside Conor Sellars in December 2020. Their first match was a 1–1 draw away at Crawley Town on 15 December 2020, the club's first point in six games. The club's CEO Ryan Sparks said that Trueman and Sellars had the board's full support whilst the search for a permanent manager was ongoing. Their second match was a 1–0 victory at home against Cambridge United on 19 December 2020, the club's first league win in eight matches. After the result, Truman and Sellars had a celebratory beer, and then spent seven to eight hours the next day planning for the next game. Trueman later said he intended to move into management after his caretaker spell ended. After leading the club to their third straight win, he downplayed his chances of being appointed permanent manager, but said he was keen to maintain his position as caretaker manager for as long as possible.

On 28 December 2020 it was announced that Trueman and Sellars had been promoted to 'interim' managers and would remain in charge of the team for at least January 2021. In January 2021 he spoke of his confidence that the club could maintain their good form, even though a number of games had been postponed due to COVID-19 and adverse weather, and later that month he spoke about a 'busy' transfer window for the club, as well as about how well the club's players had coped with nearly a month without a competitive match.

In February 2021 Sparks said that Trueman and Sellars were happy with their 'interim' status and were not pushing to be made permanent managers. Later that month, after suffering their first defeat in 9 games under Trueman and Sellars, Trueman said that he was sure the players would bounce back. Later that month Trueman and Sellars were nominated for the January 2021 EFL League Two Manager of the Month award, after 2 wins and 1 draw in their 3 league games that month. Trueman and Sellars were also praised by player Connor Wood for their maturity and detail.

On 22 February 2021 Trueman and Sellars were announced as Bradford City's joint permanent managers, on a contract until the end of the 2021–22 season. They were the youngest managers in the English Football League.

By 8 March 2021, Trueman and Sellars had won 10 out of 15 league games, only losing once, and guided Bradford City from 22nd to 10th in the division. That same day the duo were nominated for the February 2021 EFL League Two Manager of the Month award, after one loss and four successive victories.

In May 2021, after a dip in the team's form which saw them lose 5 matches in a row, Sellars said that he and Trueman would get out of their slump and that they had done their job in guiding the club away from relegation. On 10 May 2021 however, the two managers had their management contracts terminated by the club, having finished the season with a run of just one point from a possible 21 that ended in a mid-table finish. The two were offered alternative roles at the club, who were hopeful that the duo would remain. It was later announced that Trueman would stay with the club as a first-team link coach, although Sellars had yet to make a decision. Sellars left Bradford City on 18 June 2021, after 7 years with the club.

On 22 June 2021 Trueman was promoted to assistant manager at Bradford City, following a conversation with new manager Derek Adams. Player Callum Cooke said Trueman staying with the club was the right decision.

After Adams was sacked as manager in February 2022, Trueman was appointed caretaker manager, his second time in the temporary role. The appointment was supported by Cooke. The club lost Trueman's first game in charge a 2–0 defeat away at Oldham Athletic. He remained in charge for a second game, at home against Harrogate Town, saying he would have to "think outside the box" due to player absences, and that he wanted his players to be more aggressive. Mark Hughes was appointed Bradford City's new manager on 24 February 2022, with Trueman remaining as assistant manager alongside incoming Glyn Hodges. Hughes stated that Trueman was a welcome presence in the backroom staff.

After Hughes and his assistant Glyn Hodges were sacked on 4 October 2023, Trueman remained as assistant manager to caretaker manager Kevin McDonald. On 31 October, Trueman replaced McDonald as caretaker manager. He "promised a smooth transition", and his first game was an FA Cup game against Wycombe Wanderers, which ended in a 2–1 defeat.

In September 2026, Trueman became joint caretaker manager with Colin Doyle. Trueman said he would like to become a full-time manager in the future. Trueman remained with the club following the permanent appointment of Michael Duff as new manager.

== Personal life ==
Trueman is close friends with Pat McGuire and Danny Forrest, both of whom he has worked with.
