= Conor Sellars =

English footballer and coach

Personal information
- Full name: Conor Joseph Sellars
- Date of birth: 15 February 1992 (age 34)
- Place of birth: Leeds, England
- Height: 1.67 m (5 ft 6 in)
- Position: Midfielder

Team information
- Current team: Hull City (coach)

Youth career
- 2007–2010: Middlesbrough
- 2010–2011: Rochdale

Senior career*
Years	Team	Apps	(Gls)
2011–2012	Fão	9	(0)
2012–2013	Hallam		(9)
2013	Höttur	8	(1)
2013	Harrogate Railway Athletic		
2013–2014	Harrogate Town	14	(1)
2014–2015	Worksop Town		
2015–2018	Tadcaster Albion		

Managerial career
- 2020–2021: Bradford City (joint caretaker manager)
- 2021: Bradford City (joint manager)
- * Club domestic league appearances and goals

Conor Joseph Sellars (born 15 February 1992) is an English football coach and former player who is the under-23 lead professional development phase coach at Hull City.

== Playing career ==
Born in Leeds, Sellars, a midfielder, began his youth career at Middlesbrough and Rochdale, before playing professionally in Portugal for Fão and in Iceland for Höttur. He made eight appearances for 2. deild karla side Höttur, scoring once. He also played non-league football in England for Hallam, Harrogate Railway Athletic, Harrogate Town, Worksop Town, and Tadcaster Albion, before retiring in May 2018 to concentrate on his coaching career.

== Coaching career ==
He has worked for Bradford City as a youth coach, before being appointed caretaker manager alongside Mark Trueman in December 2020. Their first match was a 1–1 draw away at Crawley Town on 15 December 2020, the club's first point in six games. The club's CEO Ryan Sparks said that Trueman and Sellars had the board's full support whilst the search for a permanent manager was ongoing. Their second match was a 1–0 victory at home against Cambridge United on 19 December 2020, the club's first league win in eight matches. After the result, Truman and Sellars had a celebratory beer, and then spent seven to eight hours the next day planning for the next game. Sellars later said that the players were reacting to the caretaker managers' hard work.

On 28 December 2020, it was announced that Trueman and Sellars had been promoted to 'interim' managers and would remain in charge of the team for at least January 2021. Sellars later spoke about being in charge for this first transfer window in January 2021, telling players who might have lost their place in the first-team as a result of new signings to continue training and working hard.

In February 2021 Bradford City CEO Ryan Sparks said that Trueman and Sellars were happy with their 'interim' status and were not pushing to be made permanent managers. Later that month Trueman and Sellars were nominated for the January 2021 EFL League Two Manager of the Month award, after 2 wins and 1 draw in their 3 league games that month. Trueman and Sellars were also praised by player Connor Wood for their maturity and detail.

On 22 February 2021, Trueman and Sellars were announced as Bradford City's joint permanent managers, on a contract until the end of the 2021–22 season. They were the youngest managers in the English Football League.

By 8 March 2021, Trueman and Sellars had won 10 out of 15 league games, only losing once, and guided Bradford City from 22nd to 10th in the division. That same day the duo were nominated for the February 2021 EFL League Two Manager of the Month award, after one loss and four successive victories.

In May 2021, after a dip in the team's form which saw them lose five matches in a row, Sellars said that he and Trueman would get out of their slump and that they had done their job in guiding the club away from relegation. On 10 May 2021, however, the two managers had their management contracts terminated by the club, having finished the season with a run of just one point from a possible 21 that ended in a mid-table finish. The two were offered alternative roles at the club, who were hopeful that the duo would remain. It was later announced that Trueman would stay with the club as a first-team link coach, although Sellars had yet to make a decision.

Sellars left Bradford City on 18 June 2021, after seven years with the club, although the club said they would still fund Sellars' UEFA Pro (Level 5) license coaching course. In July 2022 he became the under-23 lead professional development phase coach at Hull City.

== Coaching style ==
In February 2021 Sellars said that he is influenced by foreign coaching styles, including the Italian football he watched as a child and the time he spent as a player in Portugal and Iceland.

== Personal life ==
His father is former footballer Scott Sellars.

== Managerial statistics ==
As of 18 February 2023

Team	From	To	Record				
Team	From	To	P	W	D	L	Win %
Bradford City	13 December 2020	10 May 2021	30	13	7	10	43.33
Total			30	13	7	10	43.33
