= 2021–22 Leyton Orient F.C. season =

Leyton Orient
2021–22 season
- Chairman: Nigel Travis
- Head Coach: Kenny Jackett (until 22 February 2022); Richie Wellens (from 9 March 2022)
- Stadium: Brisbane Road
- League Two: 13th
- FA Cup: Third round
- EFL Cup: First round
- EFL Trophy: Group stage
- Top goalscorer: League: Harry Smith, Aaron Drinan (13); All: Aaron Drinan (16)
- Highest home attendance: 6,623 v. Tranmere Rovers, League Two (7 May 2022)
- Lowest home attendance: 2,295 v. Charlton Athletic, Papa John’s Trophy (9 November 2021)
| Home colours | Away colours | Third colours |

The 2021–22 season is Leyton Orient's 123rd year in their history and third consecutive season in League Two. Along with the league, the club will also compete in the FA Cup, the EFL Cup and the EFL Trophy. The season covers the period from 1 July 2021 to 30 June 2022.

== Transfers ==
=== Transfers in ===
| Date | Position | Nationality | Name | From | Fee | Ref. |
|---|---|---|---|---|---|---|
| 9 June 2021 | CM | (England) | Darren Pratley | (England) Charlton Athletic | Free transfer | |
| 15 June 2021 | CB | (Grenada) | Omar Beckles | (England) Crewe Alexandra | Free transfer | |
| 16 June 2021 | LB | (England) | Connor Wood | (England) Bradford City | Free transfer | |
| 25 June 2021 | SS | (Northern Ireland) | Paul Smyth | (England) Queens Park Rangers | Free transfer | |
| 29 June 2021 | CF | (Republic of Ireland) | Aaron Drinan | (England) Ipswich Town | Undisclosed | |
| 7 July 2021 | CF | (England) | Harry Smith | (England) Northampton Town | Undisclosed | |
| 20 July 2021 | RB | (Wales) | Tom James | (Scotland) Hibernian | Free transfer | |
| 31 August 2021 | CM | (Republic of Ireland) | Callum Reilly | (England) AFC Wimbledon | Free transfer | |
| 19 January 2022 | RW | (Pakistan) | Otis Khan | (England) Walsall | Free transfer | |
| 24 January 2022 | CB | (England) | Jordan Brown | (England) Derby County | Free transfer | |
| 24 January 2022 | DM | (England) | Ethan Coleman | (England) King's Lynn Town | Undisclosed | |

=== Loans in ===
| Date from | Position | Nationality | Name | From | Date until | Ref. |
|---|---|---|---|---|---|---|
| 29 July 2021 | LM | (Scotland) | Theo Archibald | (England) Lincoln City | End of season | |
| 17 August 2021 | CF | (Belgium) | Tyrese Omotoye | (England) Norwich City | 5 January 2022 | (Note: On 5 January 2022, Omotoye was recalled back to Norwich City to facilitate a loan move to Carlisle United.) |
| 31 August 2021 | CB | (England) | Alex Mitchell | (England) Millwall | End of season | |
| 13 January 2022 | RB | (England) | Dan Moss | (England) Millwall | End of season | |
| 31 January 2022 | CF | (England) | Frank Nouble | (England) Colchester United | End of season | |
| 31 January 2022 | CB | (Wales) | George Ray | (England) Exeter City | End of season | |

=== Loans out ===
| Date from | Position | Nationality | Name | To | Date until | Ref. |
|---|---|---|---|---|---|---|
| 18 August 2021 | GK | (England) | Sam Sargeant | (England) Barnet | 13 October 2021 | |
| 19 November 2021 | LB | (England) | Jayden Sweeney | (England) Wealdstone | December 2021 | |
| 11 January 2022 | GK | (England) | Sam Sargeant | (England) Wealdstone | 18 January 2022 | |
| 5 March 2022 | LB | (England) | Jayden Sweeney | (England) Dartford | April 2022 | |
| 25 March 2022 | CM | (Republic of Ireland) | Callum Reilly | (England) Solihull Moors | End of season | |

=== Transfers out ===
| Date | Position | Nationality | Name | To | Fee | Ref. |
|---|---|---|---|---|---|---|
| 30 June 2021 | CF | (England) | Lee Angol | (England) Bradford City | Released | |
| 30 June 2021 | CB | (England) | Josh Coulson | (England) Southend United | Released | |
| 30 June 2021 | RM | (England) | James Dayton | (England) Dulwich Hamlet | Released | |
| 30 June 2021 | CF | (England) | Louis Dennis | (England) Bromley | Released | |
| 30 June 2021 | RB | (England) | Myles Judd | (England) Dover Athletic | Released | |
| 30 June 2021 | RB | (England) | Sam Ling | (England) Dagenham & Redbridge | Released | |
| 30 June 2021 | RW | (England) | Jordan Maguire-Drew | (England) Woking | Released | |
| 30 June 2021 | LW | (Jamaica) | Jobi McAnuff | Retired | | |
| 30 June 2021 | CM | (England) | Brendon Shabani | (England) St Neots Town | Released | |
| 30 June 2021 | CB | (England) | Jamie Turley | (England) Barnet | Released | |
| 30 June 2021 | LB | (England) | Joe Widdowson | (England) Barnet | Released | |
| 30 June 2021 | CF | (England) | Danny Johnson | (England) Mansfield Town | Free transfer | |
| 30 June 2021 | LM | (England) | James Brophy | (England) Cambridge United | Free transfer | |
| 30 June 2021 | CF | (Republic of Ireland) | Conor Wilkinson | (England) Walsall | Free transfer | |
| 8 August 2021 | DM | (Mali) | Ousseynou Cissé | (England) Oldham Athletic | Free transfer | |
| 13 August 2021 | RW | (England) | Bryan Ifeanyi | (England) Colchester United | Free transfer | |
| 31 January 2022 | RW | (England) | Dan Kemp | (England) Milton Keynes Dons | Undisclosed | |

== Pre-season and friendlies ==
Leyton Orient announced friendly matches against Dundee, West Ham United, Tottenham Hotspur, Maidenhead United, Dulwich Hamlet, Gillingham, and Heybridge Swifts as part of their pre-season preparations.

| 6 July 2021 Friendly | Dundee | 3–0 | Leyton Orient | Dundee |
| 17:00 BST | McGowan 5'; Jakubiak 46'; Ashcroft 49' | Report | | Stadium: Kilmac Stadium |

| 13 July 2021 Friendly | Leyton Orient | 0–0 | West Ham United | Leyton |
| 19:00 BST | | Report | | Stadium: Breyer Group Stadium |

| 17 July 2021 JE3 Trophy | Leyton Orient | 1–1 | Tottenham Hotspur | Leyton |
| 15:00 BST | Sotiriou 72' | Report | Scarlett 38' | Stadium: Breyer Group Stadium |

| 24 July 2021 Friendly | Maidenhead United | 1–2 | Leyton Orient | Maidenhead |
| 15:00 BST | Acquah (?) | Report | Pratley (?); Sotiriou (?) | Stadium: York Road |

| 27 July 2021 Friendly | Dulwich Hamlet | 1–1 | Leyton Orient XI | East Dulwich |
| 19:30 BST | Harris-Sealy 62' | Report | Obiero 80' | Stadium: Champion Hill; Attendance: 551 |

| 31 July 2021 Friendly | Leyton Orient | 2–0 | Gillingham | Leyton |
| 14:00 BST | Beckles 13'; Trialist 36' | Report | | Stadium: Breyer Group Stadium |

| 3 August 2021 Friendly | Heybridge Swifts | 1–2 | Leyton Orient XI | Maldon |
| 19:00 BST | Cole 37' | Report | Young 13'; Trialist 90' | Stadium: Maldon Stadium |

| 18 August 2021 Friendly | Leyton Orient | 0–2 | Southampton U23s | Leyton |
| 13:00 BST | | Report | Mitchell 62'; Smith 90' | Stadium: Breyer Group Stadium; Attendance: 0 (Behind-closed-doors) |

| 29 September 2021 Friendly | Barnet | 1–2 | Leyton Orient | London Borough of Harrow |
| | | Report | Young x2 | Attendance: 0 (Behind-closed-doors) |

== Competitions ==
=== League Two ===
==== League table ====
| Pos | Team | Pld | W | D | L | GF | GA | GD | Pts |
|---|---|---|---|---|---|---|---|---|---|
| 10 | Salford City | 46 | 19 | 13 | 14 | 60 | 46 | +14 | 70 |
| 11 | Newport County | 46 | 19 | 12 | 15 | 67 | 58 | +9 | 69 |
| 12 | Crawley Town | 46 | 17 | 10 | 19 | 56 | 66 | −10 | 61 |
| 13 | Leyton Orient | 46 | 14 | 16 | 16 | 62 | 47 | +15 | 58 |
| 14 | Bradford City | 46 | 14 | 16 | 16 | 53 | 55 | −2 | 58 |
| 15 | Colchester United | 46 | 14 | 13 | 19 | 48 | 60 | −12 | 55 |
| 16 | Walsall | 46 | 14 | 12 | 20 | 47 | 60 | −13 | 54 |

Source: EFL Official Website
Rules for classification: 1) Points; 2) Goal difference; 3) Number of goals scored; 4) Head-to-head results; 5) Wins; 6) Away goals; 7) Penalty points (sec 9.5); 8) 12-point sending off offences

==== Results summary ====
| Overall | | | | | | | | Home | | | | | | Away | | | | | |
| Pld | W | D | L | GF | GA | GD | Pts | W | D | L | GF | GA | GD | W | D | L | GF | GA | GD |
|---|---|---|---|---|---|---|---|---|---|---|---|---|---|---|---|---|---|---|---|
| 46 | 14 | 16 | 16 | 62 | 47 | +15 | 58 | 9 | 5 | 9 | 36 | 22 | +14 | 5 | 11 | 7 | 26 | 25 | +1 |

Last updated: 7 May 2022.

==== Results by matchday ====
| Matchday | 1 | 2 | 3 | 4 | 5 | 6 | 7 | 8 | 9 | 10 | 11 | 12 | 13 | 14 | 15 | 16 | 17 | 18 | 19 | 20 | 21 | 22 | 23 | 24 | 25 | 26 | 27 | 28 | 29 | 30 | 31 | 32 | 33 | 34 | 35 | 36 | 37 | 38 | 39 | 40 | 41 | 42 | 43 | 44 | 45 | 46 |
|---|---|---|---|---|---|---|---|---|---|---|---|---|---|---|---|---|---|---|---|---|---|---|---|---|---|---|---|---|---|---|---|---|---|---|---|---|---|---|---|---|---|---|---|---|---|---|
| Ground | A | H | A | H | H | A | H | A | H | A | A | H | H | A | H | A | H | A | A | H | H | A | H | H | A | A | H | A | H | H | H | A | H | A | A | H | A | H | A | A | A | H | A | H | A | H |
| Result | D | W | D | L | W | D | W | W | D | L | D | D | D | D | W | D | W | D | L | W | L | L | D | L | L | D | L | L | L | L | L | D | D | D | D | W | W | W | L | W | L | W | W | L | W | L |
| Position | 10 | 5 | 11 | 11 | 6 | 6 | 3 | 2 | 2 | 4 | 6 | 7 | 10 | 9 | 6 | 9 | 6 | 8 | 8 | 7 | 9 | 9 | 11 | 14 | 15 | 15 | 15 | 16 | 16 | 18 | 18 | 18 | 20 | 20 | 20 | 18 | 17 | 17 | 17 | 14 | 14 | 14 | 13 | 13 | 13 | 13 |

Updated to match(es) played on 7 May 2022. Source: Statto.com
A = Away; H = Home; W = Win; D = Draw; L = Loss

==== Matches ====
The O’s fixtures were announced on 24 June 2021.

| 7 August 2021 1 | Salford City | 1–1 | Leyton Orient | Salford |
| 15:00 BST | Willock 41'; Turnbull (yellow card) 80' | Report | Beckles 33'; Pratley (yellow card) 88' | Stadium: Peninsula Stadium; Attendance: 1,968; Referee: Andrew Kitchen |

| 14 August 2021 2 | Leyton Orient | 3–0 | Exeter City | Leyton |
| 15:00 BST | Drinan 7'; Beckles 25'; James (yellow card) 59'; Archibald 77' | Report | Grounds (yellow card) 25' (yellow-red card) 74'; Jay (penalty missed) 65' | Stadium: Breyer Group Stadium; Attendance: 4,860; Referee: Tom Reeves |

| 21 August 2021 3 | Carlisle United | 1–1 | Leyton Orient | Carlisle |
| 15:00 BST | Abrahams 9' (pen.) | Report | Sweeney (yellow card) 17'; Smith (yellow card) 55', (goal) 74'; Drinan (yellow card) 61'; Kyprianou (yellow card) 65'; Clay (yellow card) 90+2' | Stadium: Brunton Park; Attendance: 4,597; Referee: Bobby Madley |

| 24 August 2021 4 | Leyton Orient | 0–2 | Harrogate Town | Leyton |
| 19:45 BST | Smith (penalty missed) 52'; Beckles (yellow card) 53'; Archibald (yellow card) 69'; Sotiriou (yellow card) 70' | Report | Armstrong 8', 31'; Muldoon (yellow card) 28' | Stadium: Breyer Group Stadium; Attendance: 3,942; Referee: Carl Brook |

| 28 August 2021 5 | Leyton Orient | 2–0 | Bradford City | Leyton |
| 15:00 BST | James (yellow card) 28'; Sotiriou 66'; Smith 82' | Report | Cooke (yellow card) 75'; Songo'o (yellow card) 87' | Stadium: Breyer Group Stadium; Attendance: 4,901; Referee: Simon Mather |

| 4 September 2021 6 | Newport County | 2–2 | Leyton Orient | Newport |
| 15:00 BST | Dolan 45+2' (pen.); Bennett (yellow card) 68'; Telford 80' | Report | Smith 34', 53'; Wood (yellow card) 90'; James (yellow card) 90+3' | Stadium: Rodney Parade; Attendance: 3,845; Referee: Leigh Doughty |

| 11 September 2021 7 | Leyton Orient | 4–0 | Oldham Athletic | Leyton |
| 15:00 BST | James (yellow card) 13', (goal) 27'; Drinan 16'; Archibald 75'; Smith 90+1' | Report | Bowden (yellow card) 25'; Jameson (yellow card) 90+5' | Stadium: Breyer Group Stadium; Attendance: 5,315; Referee: Ben Toner |

| 18 September 2021 8 | Bristol Rovers | 1–3 | Leyton Orient | Horfield |
| 15:00 BST | Finley (yellow card) 28'; Kilgour (yellow card) 45+1'; Pitman 90+2' (pen.) | Report | Smith 17'; Archibald 33', (yellow card) 69'; Drinan 41', (yellow card) 45+1'; Pratley (yellow card) 45+1'; Mitchell (yellow card) 47'; Clay (yellow card) 80'; Vigouroux (yellow card) 83' | Stadium: The Memorial Stadium; Attendance: 6,172; Referee: David Rock |

| 25 September 2021 9 | Leyton Orient | 0–0 | Mansfield Town | Leyton |
| 15:00 BST | Ogie (yellow card) 86'; Mitchell (yellow card) 86'; James (yellow card) 87' | Report | Hewitt (yellow card) 56'; Sinclair (red card) 85'; Oates (yellow card) 87' | Stadium: Breyer Group Stadium; Attendance: 5,252; Referee: Ben Speedie |

| 2 October 2021 10 | Port Vale | 3–2 | Leyton Orient | Burslem |
| 15:00 BST | Wilson 6'; Smith (yellow card) 65'; Taylor (yellow card) 88'; Politic 90+1'; Proctor 90+3' | Report | Kyprianou (yellow card) 28'; Beckles (yellow card) 31'; Ogie (yellow card) 37'; Jones 60' (o.g.); James (yellow card) 74', (goal) 86' | Stadium: Vale Park; Attendance: 5,667; Referee: Chris Sarginson |

| 9 October 2021 11 | Barrow | 1–1 | Leyton Orient | Barrow-in-Furness |
| 15:00 BST | Gotts 48' | Report | Beckles 69'; Archibald (yellow card) 90+2'; Wood (yellow card) 90+4' | Stadium: The Dune Hotel Stadium; Attendance: 3,374; Referee: Peter Wright |

| 16 October 2021 12 | Leyton Orient | 0–0 | Walsall | Leyton |
| 15:00 BST | Smith (yellow card) 67'; Smyth (yellow card) 84' | Report | | Stadium: Breyer Group Stadium; Attendance: 5,826; Referee: Ollie Yates |

| 19 October 2021 13 | Leyton Orient | 1–1 | Forest Green Rovers | Leyton |
| 19:45 GMT | Pratley (yellow card) 62'; Sotirou 76' | Report | Adams (yellow card) 45+3'; Stevens 68' | Stadium: Breyer Group Stadium; Attendance: 4,391; Referee: Christopher Pollard |

| 23 October 2021 14 | Stevenage | 0–0 | Leyton Orient | Stevenage |
| 15:00 BST | | Report | Archibald (yellow card) 32' | Stadium: Lamex Stadium; Attendance: 3,544; Referee: James Bell |

| 30 October 2021 15 | Leyton Orient | 5–0 | Hartlepool United | Leyton |
| 15:00 BST | Pratley (yellow card) 14'; Drinan 20', 84', 90+6'; Clay (yellow card) 29'; Smith 35'; James 56' | Report | Featherstone (yellow card) 23'; Holohan (yellow card) 39' | Stadium: Breyer Group Stadium; Attendance: 6,233; Referee: Alan Young |

| 13 November 2021 16 | Rochdale | 2–2 | Leyton Orient | Spotland |
| 15:00 GMT | Newby 1', 90'; Odoh (yellow card) 11'; O'Keeffe (yellow card) 31'; Coleman (yellow card) 90+3' | Report | Kyprianou (yellow card) 15'; Drinan 24'; Ogie (yellow card) 30'; Clay 66'; Kemp (yellow card) 69'; Smith (yellow card) 90+3' | Stadium: Crown Oil Arena; Attendance: 2,751; Referee: Anthony Backhouse |

| 20 November 2021 17 | Leyton Orient | 4–1 | Sutton United | Leyton |
| 15:00 GMT | Archibald 30'; Smith 46', 82'; Ogie (yellow card) 68'; James 90+4' | Report | Olaofe 18'; Ajiboye (yellow card) 77'; Eastmond (yellow card) 88' | Stadium: Breyer Group Stadium; Attendance: 5,840; Referee: Scott Oldham |

| 23 November 2021 18 | Scunthorpe United | 1–1 | Leyton Orient | Scunthorpe |
| 19:45 GMT | Millen (yellow card) 42'; Scrimshaw 64'; Thompson (yellow card) 78'; Pugh (yellow card) 83'; Perry (yellow card) 85' | Report | Drinan 21'; Mitchell (yellow card) 90+1' | Stadium: Sands Venue Stadium; Attendance: 2,067; Referee: Sam Barrott |

| 27 November 2021 19 | Northampton Town | 1–0 | Leyton Orient | Sixfields |
| 15:00 GMT | Hoskins 41' | Report | Kyprianou (yellow card) 52'; Wood (yellow card) 90' | Stadium: PTS Academy Stadium; Attendance: 5,769; Referee: Andrew Kitchen |

| 7 December 2021 20 | Leyton Orient | 4–1 | Swindon Town | Leyton |
| 19:45 GMT | Clay (yellow card) 12'; Drinan 19', 59'; Kemp (yellow card) 45+2'; Beckles (yellow card) 56'; Smith 64', 82'; Ogie (yellow card) 76' | Report | McKirdy 42', (yellow card) 64'; Reed (yellow card) 83' | Stadium: Breyer Group Stadium; Attendance: 4,020; Referee: Darren Drysdale |

| 11 December 2021 21 | Leyton Orient | 1–2 | Crawley Town | Leyton |
| 15:00 GMT | Ogie (yellow card) 13'; Smith (yellow card) 32'; Morris 62' (o.g.); Clay (yellow card) 73'; Happe (yellow card) 82'; Wood (yellow card) 87'; Pratley (yellow card) 90+1' (yellow-red card) 90+5' | Report | Appiah (yellow card) 28', (goal) 66'; Francomb 32'; Ferry (yellow card) 37'; Davies (yellow card) 51' | Stadium: Breyer Group Stadium; Attendance: 5,142; Referee: Carl Boyeson |

| 18 December 2021 22 | Tranmere Rovers | 1–0 | Leyton Orient | Birkenhead |
| 15:00 GMT | Davies (yellow card) 34'; Spearing 58' | Report | Happe (yellow card) 48'; Thompson (yellow card) 67'; Sweeney (yellow card) 70' | Stadium: Prenton Park; Referee: Paul Howard |

| 22 January 2022 23 | Leyton Orient | 0–0 | Port Vale | Leyton |
| 15:00 GMT | Mitchell (yellow card) 51'; Ogie (yellow card) 70'; Wood (yellow card) 73'; Beckles (yellow card) 80' | Report | Garrity (yellow card) 42'; Walker (yellow card) 79' | Stadium: Breyer Group Stadium; Attendance: 5,761; Referee: Declan Bourne |

| 25 January 2022 24 | Leyton Orient | 0–1 | Newport County | Leyton |
| 19:45 GMT | Brown (yellow card) 49'; Kyprianou (yellow card) 82' | Report | Demetriou (yellow card) 57'; Norman 85' | Stadium: Breyer Group Stadium; Attendance: 3,413; Referee: James Bell |

| 29 January 2022 25 | Mansfield Town | 2–0 | Leyton Orient | Mansfield |
| 15:00 GMT | Hewitt (yellow card) 41'; Bowery 44'; Clarke 72' | Report | Smith (yellow card) 45' | Stadium: One Call Stadium; Attendance: 5,851; Referee: Sam Allison |

| 1 February 2022 26 | Bradford City | 1–1 | Leyton Orient | Bradford |
| 19:45 GMT | O'Connor (yellow card) 24'; Foulds (yellow card) 69'; Watt 83' | Report | Smith (yellow card) 30'; Pratley 69'; Archibald (yellow card) 80' | Stadium: Utilita Energy Stadium; Attendance: 13,646; Referee: Darren Handley |

| 5 February 2022 27 | Leyton Orient | 0–1 | Colchester United | Leyton |
| 15:00 GMT | Moss (yellow card) 49'; Young (yellow card) 90+6' | Report | Sears 4', (yellow card) 40'; Welch-Hayes (yellow card) 83'; Kennedy (yellow card) 90+5' | Stadium: Breyer Group Stadium; Attendance: 5,641; Referee: Tom Reeves |

| 8 February 2022 28 | Exeter City | 1–0 | Leyton Orient | Exeter |
| 19:45 GMT | Dieng (yellow card) 54'; Brown (yellow card) 81'; Diabate 90+2' | Report | Thompson (yellow card) 24'; Pratley (yellow card) 75'; Beckles (yellow card) 90+1' | Stadium: St James Park; Attendance: 4,111; Referee: Carl Brook |

| 12 February 2022 29 | Leyton Orient | 0–2 | Salford City | Leyton |
| 15:00 GMT | | Report | Shephard 50'; Vassell 60' | Stadium: Breyer Group Stadium; Attendance: 4,427; Referee: Ben Speedie |

| 22 February 2022 30 | Leyton Orient | 0–2 | Bristol Rovers | Leyton |
| 19:45 GMT | Ogie (yellow card) 9'; Beckles (yellow card) 14'; Pratley (yellow card) 40'; Khan (yellow card) 90+4' | Report | Evans (yellow card) 28', (goal) 34'; Collins 37'; Whelan (yellow card) 76'; Loft (yellow card) 82' | Stadium: Breyer Group Stadium; Attendance: 3,840; Referee: Charles Breakspear |

| 26 February 2022 31 | Leyton Orient | 0–1 | Carlisle United | Leyton |
| 15:00 GMT | Beckles (yellow card) 10'; Archibald (yellow card) 48' (yellow-red card) 50' | Report | Patrick 5'; Armer (yellow card) 52'; Riley (yellow card) 56'; Whelan (yellow card) 70'; Simeu (yellow card) 76' | Stadium: Breyer Group Stadium; Attendance: 5,272; Referee: Carl Boyeson |

| 1 March 2022 32 | Colchester United | 2–2 | Leyton Orient | Colchester |
| 19:45 GMT | Judge (yellow card) 36'; Kenlock 75'; Edwards 79'; Sears (yellow card) 90+6' | Report | Sotiriou (yellow card) 11', (goal) 66'; Young (yellow card) 41'; Smith (yellow card) 78'; Smyth (yellow card) 90+2'; Coleman 90+3' | Stadium: JobServe Community Stadium; Attendance: 3,415; Referee: Neil Hair |

| 5 March 2022 33 | Leyton Orient | 2–2 | Stevenage | Leyton |
| 15:00 GMT | Sotiriou 30'; Coleman (yellow card) 85'; Archibald 90+4' | Report | Prosser 24'; Norris 32'; James-Wildin (yellow card) 77' | Stadium: Breyer Group Stadium; Attendance: 4,558; Referee: Darren Drysdale |

| 12 March 2022 34 | Hartlepool United | 0–0 | Leyton Orient | Hartlepool |
| 15:00 GMT | | Report | Kyprianou (yellow card) 16'; Beckles (yellow card) 45+1'; Sotiriou (yellow card) 79' | Stadium: Suit Direct Stadium; Attendance: 5,903; Referee: James Oldham |

| 15 March 2022 35 | Forest Green Rovers | 1–1 | Leyton Orient | Nailsworth |
| 19:45 GMT | Stevens 10'; Adams (yellow card) 58'; Hendry (yellow card) 63' | Report | Sotiriou 67'; Wood (yellow card) 81' | Stadium: The Fully Charged New Lawn; Attendance: 1,891; Referee: Trevor Kettle |

| 19 March 2022 36 | Leyton Orient | 3–1 | Rochdale | Leyton |
| 15:00 GMT | Smyth 40'; Kyprianou (yellow card) 49'; Sotiriou 58'; Smith 80'; Vigouroux (yellow card) 85' | Report | Newby 6'; Ball (yellow card) 82'; Campbell (yellow card) 85' | Stadium: Breyer Group Stadium; Attendance: 4,791; Referee: David Rock |

| 22 March 2022 37 | Harrogate Town | 0–3 | Leyton Orient | Harrogate |
| 19:00 GMT | McArdle (yellow card) 3'; Sheron (yellow card) 90+1' | Report | Drinan 51', 57'; Sotiriou 73' | Stadium: The EnviroVent Stadium; Referee: Ross Joyce |

| 26 March 2022 38 | Leyton Orient | 2–0 | Barrow | Leyton |
| 15:00 GMT | Pratley (yellow card) 27'; Smyth 52'; Sotiriou 62'; Beckles (yellow card) 88' | Report | Brough (yellow card) 16'; Taylor (yellow card) 32'; Rooney (yellow card) 65'; Canavan (yellow card) 80'; White (yellow card) 90+4' | Stadium: Breyer Group Stadium; Attendance: 6,032; Referee: Simon Mather |

| 29 March 2022 39 | Oldham Athletic | 2–0 | Leyton Orient | Oldham |
| 19:45 GMT | Ray 33' (o.g.); Whelan 90+5' | Report | Kyprianou (yellow card) 52'; Pratley (yellow card) 88' | Stadium: Boundary Park; Attendance: 4,619; Referee: Chris Sarginson |

| 2 April 2022 40 | Walsall | 0–2 | Leyton Orient | Bescot |
| 15:00 BST | | Report | Smith 10', (yellow card) 40'; Khan 16'; Beckles (yellow card) 63'; Sotiriou (yellow card) 73' | Stadium: Banks's Stadium; Attendance: 4,849; Referee: Andy Haines |

| 9 April 2022 41 | Sutton United | 1–0 | Leyton Orient | Sutton |
| 15:00 BST | Kizzi 21'; Bugiel (yellow card) 59' | Report | Kyprianou (yellow card) 41'; Archibald (yellow card) 85'; Khan (yellow card) 90+5' | Stadium: VBS Community Stadium; Attendance: 3,152; Referee: Robert Lewis |

| 15 April 2022 42 | Leyton Orient | 3–0 | Scunthorpe United | Leyton |
| 15:00 BST | Smyth 15'; Archibald 24'; Thompson (yellow card) 27'; Sotiriou 30'; Beckles (yellow card) 53' | Report | Hackney (yellow card) 42' | Stadium: Breyer Group Stadium; Attendance: 5,342; Referee: Declan Bourne |

| 18 April 2022 43 | Swindon Town | 1–2 | Leyton Orient | Swindon |
| 15:00 BST | Barry (yellow card) 37'; O'Brien (yellow card) 38'; Davison 78' | Report | Kyprianou (yellow card) 18' (yellow-red card) 24'; Beckles 20', 54'; Pratley (yellow card) 37'; Ogie (yellow card) 37'; Archibald (yellow card) 38'; Brown (yellow card) 89' | Stadium: County Ground; Attendance: 10,264; Referee: Sam Allison |

| 23 April 2022 44 | Leyton Orient | 2–4 | Northampton Town | Leyton |
| 15:00 BST | Archibald 45+1'; Brown 50'; Ogie (red card) 84' | Report | Pinnock 19', (yellow card) 43'; Hoskins (yellow card) 29'; Guthrie 32'; Eppiah 38', 45+3'; McWilliams (yellow card) 41'; Sowerby (yellow card) 75'; Rose (yellow card) 84' | Stadium: Breyer Group Stadium; Attendance: 6,237; Referee: Darren Handley |

| 30 April 2022 45 | Crawley Town | 0–2 | Leyton Orient | Crawley |
| 15:00 BST | Tunnicliffe (yellow card) 18'; Lynch (yellow card) 21'; Hutchinson (yellow card) 70'; Tilley (yellow card) 90'; Nadesan (yellow card) 90+3' | Report | Archibald 8'; Drinan (penalty missed) 18', 90+5'; Mitchell (yellow card) 86' | Stadium: The People's Pension Stadium; Attendance: 3,372; Referee: Paul Howard |

| 7 May 2022 46 | Leyton Orient | 0–1 | Tranmere Rovers | Leyton |
| 15:00 BST | Archibald (yellow card) 78' | Report | O'Connor (yellow card) 29'; Hemmings 37', (yellow card) 55'; Davies (yellow card) 45'; Warrington (yellow card) 69' | Stadium: Breyer Group Stadium; Attendance: 6,623; Referee: Seb Stockbridge |

=== FA Cup ===
Leyton Orient were drawn at home to Ebbsfleet United in the first round, Tranmere Rovers in the second round and away to Stoke City in the third round.

| 6 November 2021 First round | Leyton Orient | 1–0 | Ebbsfleet United | Leyton |
| 15:00 GMT | Drinan 24'; Clay (yellow card) 53' | Report | Chapman (yellow card) 58' | Stadium: Breyer Group Stadium; Attendance: 3,451; Referee: Will Finnie |

| 4 December 2021 Second round | Leyton Orient | 4–0 | Tranmere Rovers | Leyton |
| 15:00 GMT | Smith 22', 83'; Beckles 36'; Drinan 60' (pen.) | Report | Spearing (yellow card) 43'; Dacres-Cogley (yellow card) 45+3'; Knight-Percival (yellow card) 59' | Stadium: Breyer Group Stadium; Attendance: 3,248; Referee: James Oldham |

| 9 January 2022 Third round | Stoke City | 2–0 | Leyton Orient | Stoke-on-Trent |
| 14:00 GMT | Ince 43'; Duhaney (yellow card) 76'; Campbell 89' | Report | Mitchell (yellow card) 72' | Stadium: Bet365 Stadium; Attendance: 5,269; Referee: Sam Barrott |

=== EFL Cup ===
Orient were drawn at home to Queens Park Rangers in the first round.

| 11 August 2021 First round | Leyton Orient | 1–1 (3–5 p) | Queens Park Rangers | Leyton |
| 19:45 BST | Wood (yellow card) 64'; Drinan 74' | Report | Dickie 16'; Odubajo (yellow card) 49' | Stadium: Breyer Group Stadium; Referee: Craig Hicks |
| | Penalties |
| | Drinan (penalty scored); Sotiriou (penalty missed); James (penalty scored); Kemp (penalty scored) | | Dykes (penalty scored); Ball (penalty scored); Dozzell (penalty scored); Kelman (penalty scored); Adomah (penalty scored) |
Note: Live on Sky Sports

=== EFL Trophy ===
Leyton were drawn into Southern Group G alongside Charlton Athletic, Crawley Town and Southampton U21s. The dates for the group stage matches were confirmed on July 14.

| Pos | Div | Team | Pld | W | PW | PL | L | GF | GA | GD | Pts | Qualification |
|---|---|---|---|---|---|---|---|---|---|---|---|---|
| 1 | L2 | Leyton Orient | 3 | 3 | 0 | 0 | 0 | 6 | 0 | +6 | 9 | Advance to Round 2 |
| 2 | L1 | Charlton Athletic | 3 | 2 | 0 | 0 | 1 | 10 | 3 | +7 | 6 | Advance to Round 2 |
| 3 | ACA | Southampton U21 | 3 | 1 | 0 | 0 | 2 | 5 | 5 | 0 | 3 | |
| 4 | L2 | Crawley Town | 3 | 0 | 0 | 0 | 3 | 1 | 14 | −13 | 0 | |

Source: EFL.com

| 14 September 2021 Group game 1 | Leyton Orient | 1–0 | Southampton U21 | Leyton |
| 19:00 BST | Kyprianou (yellow card) 9'; Papadopoulos 82', (yellow card) 90+2' | Report | Simeu (yellow card) 58' | Stadium: Breyer Group Stadium; Attendance: 634; Referee: Trevor Kettle |

| 5 October 2021 Group game 2 | Crawley Town | 0–4 | Leyton Orient | Crawley |
| 19:00 BST | | Report | Sotiriou 7', 59'; Happe 30'; Kemp 77' | Stadium: The People's Pension Stadium; Attendance: 810; Referee: Will Finnie |

| 9 November 2021 Group game 3 | Leyton Orient | 1–0 | Charlton Athletic | Leyton |
| 19:00 GMT | Papadopoulos (yellow card) 57' (yellow-red card) 65'; Smyth 78'; Sotiriou (yellow card) 90+4' | Report | Chin (yellow card) 45+1' | Stadium: Breyer Group Stadium; Attendance: 2,295; Referee: Sam Purkiss |

| 30 November 2021 Second round | Leyton Orient | 0–0 (4–5 p) | Milton Keynes Dons | Leyton |
| 19:00 GMT | Thompson (yellow card) 3' | Report | Parrott (red card) 90+1' | Stadium: Breyer Group Stadium; Attendance: 990; Referee: Craig Hicks |
| | Penalties |
| | Sotiriou (penalty missed); James (penalty scored); Smith (penalty scored); Archibald (penalty scored); Happe (penalty scored) | | Eisa (penalty scored); Boateng (penalty scored); Martin (penalty scored); Darling (penalty scored); Baldwin (penalty scored) |

== Player statistics ==
| No. | Pos | Nat | Player | Total | | League Two | | FA Cup | | EFL Cup | | EFL Trophy | |
| No. | Pos | Nat | Player | Apps | Goals | Apps | Goals | Apps | Goals | Apps | Goals | Apps | Goals |
Goalkeepers
| 1 | GK | (England) ENG | Sam Sargeant | 0 | 0 | 0 | 0 | 0 | 0 | 0 | 0 | 0 | 0 |
| 22 | GK | (Chile) CHI | Lawrence Vigouroux | 50 | 0 | 46 | 0 | 3 | 0 | 1 | 0 | 0 | 0 |
| 27 | GK | (England) ENG | Rhys Byrne | 4 | 0 | 0 | 0 | 0 | 0 | 0 | 0 | 4 | 0 |
| 31 | GK | (England) ENG | Noah Phillips | 0 | 0 | 0 | 0 | 0 | 0 | 0 | 0 | 0 | 0 |
Defenders
| 2 | DF | (Wales) WAL | Tom James | 26 | 4 | 21 | 4 | 2 | 0 | 1 | 0 | 1+1 | 0 |
| 3 | DF | (England) ENG | Connor Wood | 36 | 0 | 29+3 | 0 | 1 | 0 | 1 | 0 | 2 | 0 |
| 5 | DF | (England) ENG | Dan Happe | 18 | 1 | 11+1 | 0 | 0+1 | 0 | 1 | 0 | 4 | 1 |
| 6 | DF | (Northern Ireland) NIR | Adam Thompson | 17 | 0 | 14 | 0 | 1 | 0 | 0 | 0 | 1+1 | 0 |
| 15 | DF | (England) ENG | Alex Mitchell (on loan from Millwall) | 30 | 0 | 23+3 | 0 | 1 | 0 | 0 | 0 | 3 | 0 |
| 17 | DF | (England) ENG | Dan Moss (on loan from Millwall) | 4 | 0 | 3+1 | 0 | 0 | 0 | 0 | 0 | 0 | 0 |
| 19 | DF | (Grenada) GRN | Omar Beckles | 49 | 6 | 44 | 5 | 3 | 1 | 1 | 0 | 1 | 0 |
| 24 | DF | (England) ENG | Jayden Sweeney | 7 | 0 | 3+2 | 0 | 0 | 0 | 0 | 0 | 2 | 0 |
| 25 | DF | (Republic of Ireland) IRL | Shadrach Ogie | 39 | 0 | 29+5 | 0 | 3 | 0 | 0 | 0 | 2 | 0 |
| 35 | DF | (Wales) WAL | George Ray (on loan from Exeter City) | 9 | 0 | 8+1 | 0 | 0 | 0 | 0 | 0 | 0 | 0 |
Midfielders
| 8 | MF | (England) ENG | Craig Clay | 23 | 1 | 14+5 | 1 | 3 | 0 | 0 | 0 | 1 | 0 |
| 11 | MF | (Scotland) SCO | Theo Archibald (on loan from Lincoln City) | 42 | 8 | 35+3 | 8 | 2 | 0 | 1 | 0 | 1 | 0 |
| 14 | MF | (Pakistan) PAK | Otis Khan | 20 | 1 | 17+3 | 1 | 0 | 0 | 0 | 0 | 0 | 0 |
| 18 | MF | (England) ENG | Darren Pratley | 44 | 1 | 34+5 | 1 | 2+1 | 0 | 1 | 0 | 1 | 0 |
| 21 | MF | (England) ENG | Matt Young | 18 | 0 | 6+8 | 0 | 0+2 | 0 | 0 | 0 | 2 | 0 |
| 23 | MF | (England) ENG | Antony Papadopoulos | 3 | 1 | 0 | 0 | 0 | 0 | 0 | 0 | 3 | 1 |
| 26 | MF | (Cyprus) CYP | Hector Kyprianou | 46 | 0 | 31+7 | 0 | 3 | 0 | 1 | 0 | 4 | 0 |
| 29 | MF | (England) ENG | Zech Obiero | 1 | 0 | 1 | 0 | 0 | 0 | 0 | 0 | 0 | 0 |
| 30 | MF | (England) ENG | Jephte Tanga | 3 | 0 | 0+1 | 0 | 0 | 0 | 0 | 0 | 0+2 | 0 |
| 32 | MF | (England) ENG | Jordan Brown | 12 | 1 | 7+5 | 1 | 0 | 0 | 0 | 0 | 0 | 0 |
| 34 | MF | (England) ENG | Ethan Coleman | 15 | 1 | 12+3 | 1 | 0 | 0 | 0 | 0 | 0 | 0 |
Forwards
| 7 | FW | (Northern Ireland) NIR | Paul Smyth | 26 | 4 | 14+10 | 3 | 1 | 0 | 0 | 0 | 1 | 1 |
| 9 | FW | (England) ENG | Harry Smith | 46 | 15 | 32+10 | 13 | 3 | 2 | 0 | 0 | 0+1 | 0 |
| 10 | FW | (England) ENG | Frank Nouble (on loan from Colchester United) | 7 | 0 | 2+5 | 0 | 0 | 0 | 0 | 0 | 0 | 0 |
| 16 | FW | (Republic of Ireland) IRL | Aaron Drinan | 44 | 16 | 36+4 | 13 | 3 | 2 | 1 | 1 | 0 | 0 |
| 20 | FW | (Cyprus) CYP | Ruel Sotiriou | 36 | 10 | 19+13 | 8 | 0 | 0 | 1 | 0 | 3 | 2 |
| 28 | FW | (England) ENG | Daniel Nkrumah | 7 | 0 | 0+3 | 0 | 0 | 0 | 0 | 0 | 1+3 | 0 |
| 33 | FW | (England) ENG | Sonny Fish | 0 | 0 | 0 | 0 | 0 | 0 | 0 | 0 | 0 | 0 |
| 36 | FW | (England) ENG | Reon Smith-Kouassi | 0 | 0 | 0 | 0 | 0 | 0 | 0 | 0 | 0 | 0 |
Out on Loan
| 4 | MF | (Republic of Ireland) IRL | Callum Reilly | 5 | 0 | 0+4 | 0 | 0 | 0 | 0 | 0 | 1 | 0 |
Left the club during the Season
| 10 | MF | (England) ENG | Dan Kemp | 24 | 1 | 15+4 | 0 | 1 | 0 | 1 | 0 | 2+1 | 1 |
| 17 | FW | (Belgium) BEL | Tyrese Omotoye (on loan from Norwich City) | 8 | 0 | 1+3 | 0 | 0 | 0 | 0 | 0 | 4 | 0 |

Last updated: 7 May 2022
Source: Competitions

=== Top scorers ===
Includes all competitive matches. The list is sorted by squad number when total goals are equal.

Last updated 7 May 2022

| Rank | No. | Nationality | Player | League Two | FA Cup | EFL Cup | EFL Trophy | Total |
|---|---|---|---|---|---|---|---|---|
| 1 | 16 | (Republic of Ireland) | Aaron Drinan | 13 | 2 | 1 | 0 | 16 |
| 2 | 11 | (England) | Harry Smith | 13 | 2 | 0 | 0 | 15 |
| 3 | 20 | (Cyprus) | Ruel Sotiriou | 8 | 0 | 0 | 2 | 10 |
| 4 | 11 | (Scotland) | Theo Archibald | 8 | 0 | 0 | 0 | 8 |
| 5 | 19 | (Grenada) | Omar Beckles | 5 | 1 | 0 | 0 | 6 |
| 6 | 2 | (Wales) | Tom James | 4 | 0 | 0 | 0 | 4 |
| 6 | 7 | (Northern Ireland) | Paul Smyth | 3 | 0 | 0 | 1 | 4 |
| 8 | 5 | (England) | Dan Happe | 0 | 0 | 0 | 1 | 1 |
| 8 | 8 | (England) | Craig Clay | 1 | 0 | 0 | 0 | 1 |
| 8 | 10 | (England) | Dan Kemp | 0 | 0 | 0 | 1 | 1 |
| 8 | 14 | (Pakistan) | Otis Khan | 1 | 0 | 0 | 0 | 1 |
| 8 | 18 | (England) | Darren Pratley | 1 | 0 | 0 | 0 | 1 |
| 8 | 23 | (England) | Antony Papadopoulos | 0 | 0 | 0 | 1 | 1 |
| 8 | 32 | (England) | Jordan Brown | 1 | 0 | 0 | 0 | 1 |
| 8 | 34 | (England) | Ethan Coleman | 1 | 0 | 0 | 0 | 1 |
| Own goals | | | | 2 | 0 | 0 | 0 | 2 |
| TOTALS | | | | 62 | 5 | 1 | 6 | 74 |
