= Antony Papadopoulos =

English footballer

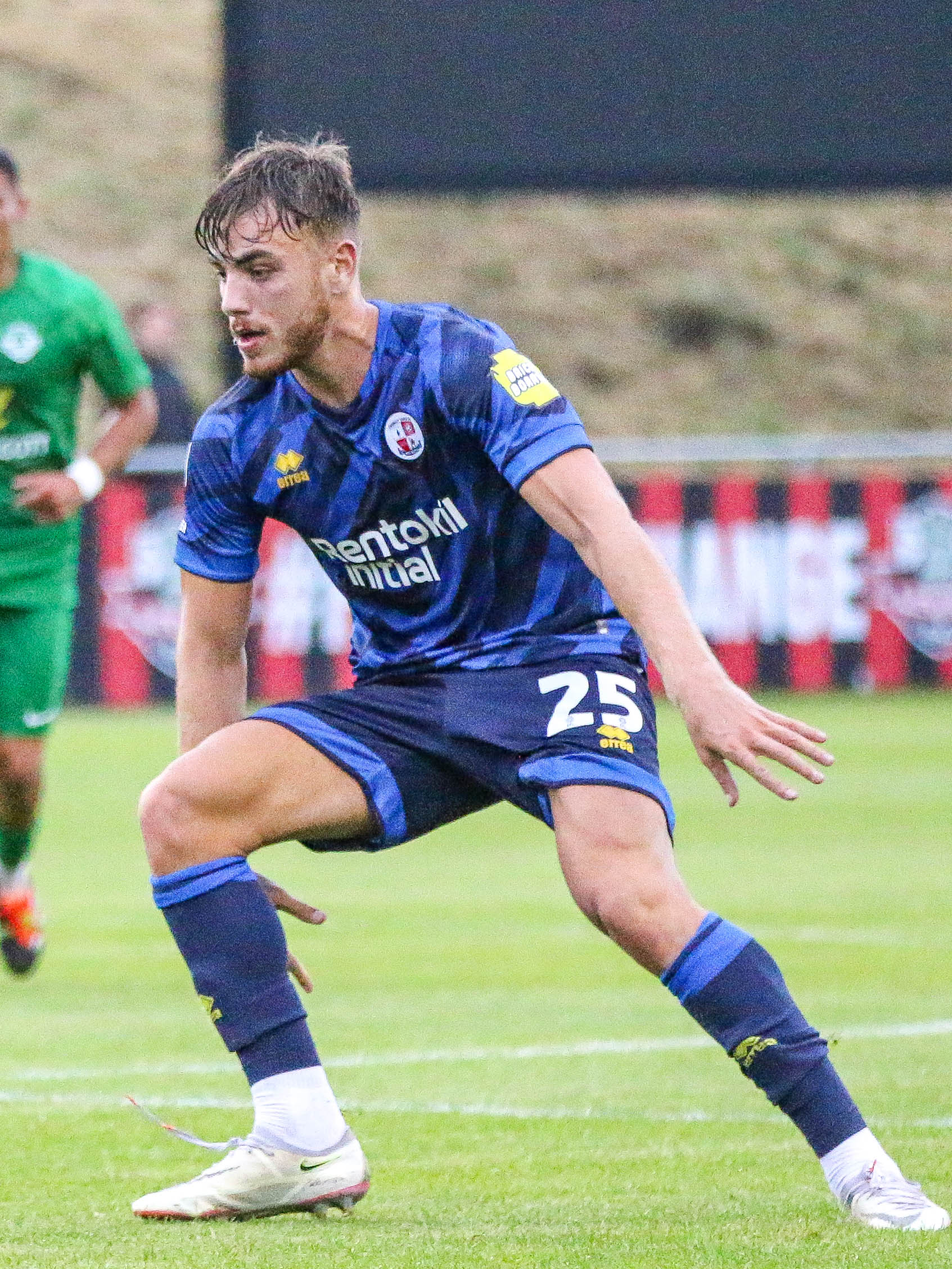
- Papadopoulos with Crawley Town in July 2024

Personal information
- Full name: Antony Papadopoulos
- Date of birth: 12 November 2002 (age 23)
- Place of birth: Enfield, England
- Position: Midfielder

Team information
- Current team: Dagenham and Redbrigde F.C.

Youth career
- –2021: Leyton Orient

Senior career*
Years	Team	Apps	(Gls)
2020–2022	Leyton Orient	0	(0)
2020	→ Harlow Town (loan)	3	(0)
2022–2024	Welling United	70	(4)
2023	→ Bowers & Pitsea (loan)	8	(3)
2024–2026	Crawley Town	6	(0)
2024	→ Maidstone United (loan)	15	(5)
2025–2026	→ Maidstone United (loan)	19	(2)
2026	→ Chelmsford City (loan)	8	(1)
2026–	Dagenham & Redbridge	-	(-)
- * Club domestic league appearances and goals as of 00:52, 21 May 2026 (UTC)

Antony Papadopoulos (born 12 November 2002) is an English professional footballer who plays as a midfielder for Dagenham and Redbridge F.C.

== Career ==
Previously a member of Leyton Orient's academy, and club Youth Team Player of the Year, Papadopoulos signed his first professional contract with the club in May 2021.

Prior to his professional contract being signed, Papadopoulos went on a work experience loan at Harlow Town in October 2020, making four appearances in total before the early curtailment of the season in December, due to the COVID-19 pandemic.

Papadopoulos made his senior debut for Orient in the EFL Trophy at home to Southampton U21 on 14 September 2021. He scored the winning goal in the 82nd minute as Orient won 1–0. He then started in Orient's next two matches in the tournament, the 4–0 win at Crawley Town on 5 October, and the 1–0 win over Charlton Athletic on 9 November, in which he was sent off. Papadopoulos was released at the end of the 2021–22 season.

On 27 July 2022, Papadopoulos signed for National League South club Welling United. In January 2023, he joined Bowers & Pitsea on an initial one-month loan deal.

=== Crawley Town ===
On 20 June 2024, Papadopoulos signed a two-year deal with newly-promoted League One side Crawley Town. He scored his first goal for Crawley in an EFL Trophy tie against Brighton & Hove Albion U21s on 20 August 2024.

In September 2024, he joined National League South side Maidstone United on loan. He was recalled by his parent club on 31 December 2024.

In September 2025, Papadopoulos returned to Maidstone United on loan.

On 23 March 2026, Papadopoulos signed for Chelmsford City on loan.

On 13 May 2026, Crawley announced Papadopoulos had been released by the club.

=== Dagenham & Redbridge ===
On 26 May 2026, Papadopolous agreed to join National League South club Dagenham & Redbridge on a two-year deal.

== Personal life ==
Born in Enfield, Papadopoulos is of Cypriot descent.

== Career statistics ==
As of match played 3 May 2025

Appearances and goals by club, season and competition
Club	Season	League			FA Cup		League Cup		Other		Total	
Club	Season	Division	Apps	Goals	Apps	Goals	Apps	Goals	Apps	Goals	Apps	Goals
Leyton Orient	2020–21	League Two	0	0	0	0	0	0	0	0	0	0
Leyton Orient	2021–22	League Two	0	0	0	0	0	0	3 (Note: Appearance(s) in EFL Trophy)	1	3	1
Leyton Orient	Total		0	0	0	0	0	0	3	1	3	1
Harlow Town (loan)	2020–21	Isthmian League South Central Division	3	0	0	0	—		1	0	4	0
Welling United	2022–23	National League South	29	1	0	0	—		2 (Note: Appearance(s) in FA Trophy)	0	31	1
Welling United	2023–24	National League South	41	3	1	0	—		2	0	44	3
Welling United	Total		70	4	1	0	0	0	4	0	75	4
Bowers & Pitsea (loan)	2022–23	Isthmian League Premier Division	8	3	0	0	—		0	0	8	3
Crawley Town	2024–25	League One	5	0	0	0	1	0	1	1	7	1
Maidstone United (loan)	2024–25	National League South	15	5	4	1	—		1	0	20	6
Career total			101	12	5	1	1	0	10	2	117	15
