= Lawrence Vigouroux =

Chilean footballer (born 1993)

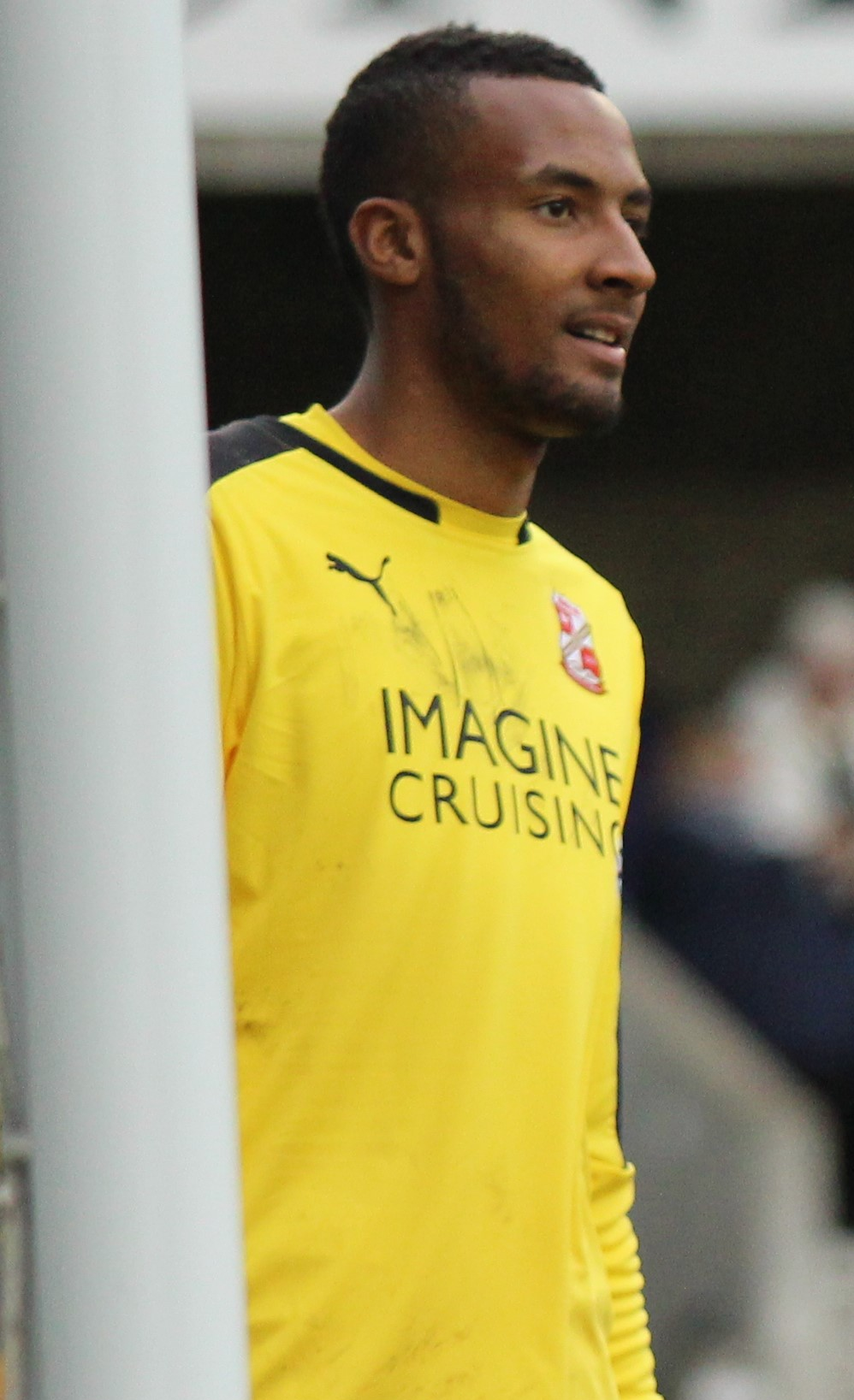
- Vigouroux with Swindon Town in 2015

Personal information
- Full name: Lawrence Ian Vigouroux
- Date of birth: 19 November 1993 (age 32)
- Place of birth: Camden, England
- Height: 6 ft 4 in (1.94 m)
- Position: Goalkeeper

Team information
- Current team: Swansea City
- Number: 22

Youth career
- –2012: Brentford
- 2012–2013: Tottenham Hotspur

Senior career*
Years	Team	Apps	(Gls)
2013–2014	Tottenham Hotspur	0	(0)
2013–2014	→ Hyde (loan)	12	(0)
2014–2016	Liverpool	0	(0)
2015–2016	→ Swindon Town (loan)	33	(0)
2016–2019	Swindon Town	86	(0)
2018	→ Waterford (loan)	19	(0)
2019	Everton de Viña del Mar	0	(0)
2020–2023	Leyton Orient	143	(0)
2023–2024	Burnley	0	(0)
2024–	Swansea City	104	(0)

International career^{‡}
2013	Chile U20	1	(0)
2025–	Chile	12	(0)
- * Club domestic league appearances and goals as of 17:05, 31 October 2026 (UTC) ‡ National team caps and goals as of 22:14, 6 October 2026

Lawrence Ian Vigouroux (born 19 November 1993) is a professional footballer who plays as a goalkeeper for EFL Championship club Swansea City. Born in England, he plays for the Chile national team.

== Club career ==
=== Tottenham Hotspur ===
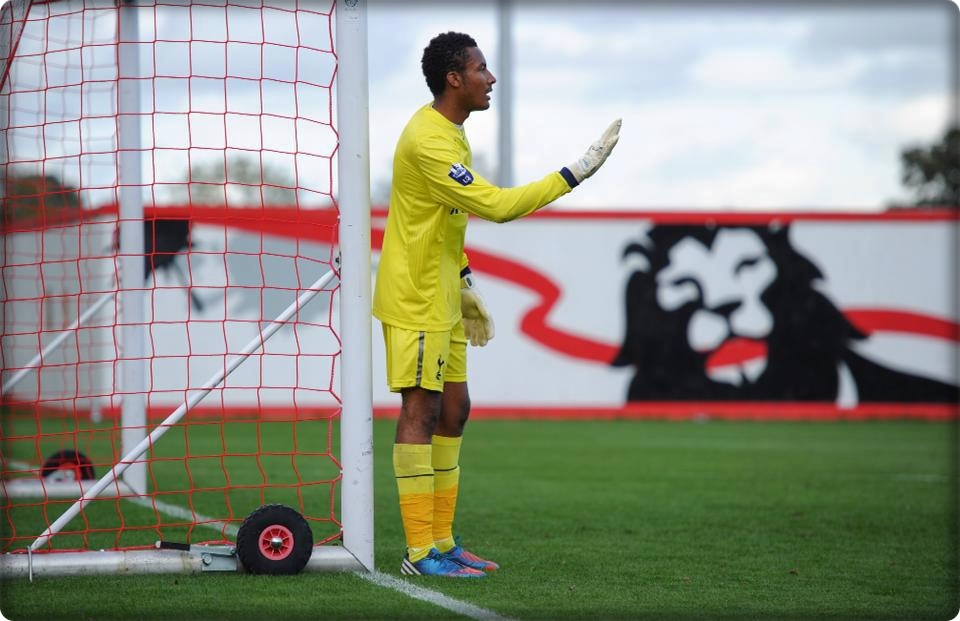
Vigouroux in goal for the Tottenham Hotspur U21 side in 2013.

Born in Camden, England, Vigouroux started his football education within the youth set-up at Brentford. However, he was released by the club in 2012 and joined the Academy at Tottenham Hotspur later that year. Vigouroux signed his first professional contract with Tottenham Hotspur in June 2013 along with fellow graduate Shaq Coulthirst.

During the 2013–14 season, Vigouroux was loaned to non-league side Hyde, initially for a month. On 28 October 2013, he made his debut for Hyde (and played his first professional match), making a number of impressive stops in a 2–0 loss against Wrexham in the FA Cup fourth qualifying round. Despite the club's nine match losing streak, he managed to impress and the loan was extended for a fortnight. He then helped the side win their first match for several months, keeping a clean sheet, in a 2–0 win over Welling United, in what turned out to be his last appearance.

=== Liverpool ===
Vigouroux joined Liverpool on 3 July 2014 after a successful trial following the expiry of his contract at Tottenham Hotspur.

At Liverpool, Vigouroux quickly became the first choice goalkeeper for the reserve side despite competing with Andy Firth and Danny Ward. At the end of the 2014–15 season, he signed a two-year contract extension.

=== Swindon Town ===
On 4 August 2015, Vigouroux was loaned to League One side Swindon Town for the rest of the season. It came after when he played as a trialist in a 4–1 loss against West Bromwich Albion on 25 July 2015. Vigouroux also featured in a friendly match against his parent club Liverpool on 2 August 2015 and the match ended with Swindon Town losing 2–1. Ahead of the 2015–16 season, he was given a number one shirt.

Vigouroux made his professional debut four days later, starting in the opening day fixture versus Bradford City. With Swindon Town 1–0 down, Vigouroux saved a first half Billy Clarke penalty to keep his side in the game as the Wiltshire outfit went on to record a 4–1 victory. Since making his Swindon Town debut, he quickly established himself in the starting eleven for the side as first choice goalkeeper. He was also praised for his performance in number of matches. On 28 September 2015, Vigouroux had his loan terminated for paying a £50 fine in pennies, but was reinstated by Swindon after he apologised. As a result, Vigouroux missed two matches as a result of his termination; where up until this point, he played in every match. He then was in goal when he was at fault after conceding a goal from Lee Angol when he failed to clear a backpass, in a 2–1 loss to Peterborough United. Despite this, Vigouroux continued to remain as the club's first choice goalkeeper. Despite losing 1–0 against Burton Albion on 28 December 2015, Vigouroux made a number of saves, including "two outstanding saves in the first 10 minutes", resulted in him being named Man of the Match by local newspaper, Swindon Advertiser. His performance resulted in the club unsuccessfully attempt to sign him on a permanent basis on two occasions. However, he soon suffered a leg injury that saw him sidelined for the rest of the season. Despite this, Vigouroux finished the 2015–16 season, making 36 appearances in all competitions and kept five clean sheets.

On 1 July 2016, he joined Swindon Town on a three-year permanent contract ahead of the 2016–17 season. The move was an undisclosed fee, which is thought to be in the region of £400,000. Vigouroux started the 2016–17 season, regaining his status as first choice goalkeeper and kept a clean sheet in the opening game of the season, in a 1–0 win over Coventry City. It wasn't until on 10 September 2016 when he was sent–off for a second bookable offence for lashing out against Alex McDonald after a lunge, in a 2–0 loss against Oxford United and served a one match suspension as a result. After returning in goal from suspension, He then kept two clean sheets in two matches between 15 October 2016 and 18 October 2016 against AFC Wimbledon and Rochdale. He later kept two clean sheets in two matches for the second time this season between 25 March 2017 and 1 April 2017 against Millwall and Fleetwood Town. In a 1–1 draw against Southend United on 22 November 2016, Vigouroux made a number of saves to keep the score down. As a result of his performance, he was linked a move away from the club. The club's chairman Lee Power revealed that he rejected several bids for Vigouroux. In the club's second encounter against Oxford United on 5 February 2017 this season, however, Vigouroux was sent–off for a foul on Kane Hemmings following a defensive mix-up, in a 2–1 loss. Eventually, his suspension was overturned after an appeal with the FA. Vigouroux was among four players to be criticised by Manager Luke Williams for their lack of commitment amid in the club's relegation zone and was fined as a result. It came after his hand injury that saw him miss one match. With the club facing relegation towards the end of the season, Vigouroux was determined to beat the drop and survive the relegation. However, the club were relegated to League Two after losing 2–1 to Scunthorpe United on 22 April 2017. Over the course of the 2016–17 season, Vigouroux won the player of the season award for Swindon Town, recording 12 clean sheets in 43 league games despite Swindon getting relegated.

Ahead of the 2017–18 season, Vigouroux was expected to leave the club following the club's relegation in League One. However, after talks with Manager David Flitcroft, he ultimately stayed at the club throughout the summer transfer window. He continued to remain the club's first choice goalkeeper at the start of the 2017–18 season. Despite his Achilles injury shortly after, Vigouroux was praised for his performance in contributions to the club's best start to the season. However, he was soon involved in an incident with the match officials and was sent–off shortly after the end of the match, in a 2–1 loss against Coventry City on 26 September 2017. As a result, he served a four match–ban, which Manager Flitcroft criticised his action as "unacceptable". After serving his suspension, he found himself in a new competition over the first choice goalkeeper against Reice Charles-Cook. As a result, Vigouroux struggled to regain his place, as he was placed on the substitute bench and his own injury concern. It wasn't until on 2 December 2017 when he returned to the starting line–up, conceding five goals, in a 5–2 against Stevenage in the second–round of the FA Cup. Following this, Vigouroux was featured for the next four matches before being dropped again for poor performances. It was revealed that Vigouroux was dropped from the squad for poor disciplinary issues. Because of this, he wanted to leave the club. Shortly after the end of the 2017–18 season, where he made 17 appearances in all competitions, Manager Phil Brown hinted that Vigouroux may have a future at the club. After a strong start to the season at Swindon Town, he got called up for Chile national football team at the start of September. He didn't play for Chile during that call-up and was an unused sub despite doing well in training sessions. When he returned to Swindon fellow goalkeeper Luke McCormick had been performing so well in Vigoroux's absence that there was no need to drop McCormick. Vigoroux made his next appearance for Swindon over a month later in a League game against Mansfield Town who were coached by fellow manager and enemy David Flitcroft. Vigoroux played well and kept his place for the next Town game against Cambridge United.

==== Waterford (loan) ====
In February 2018, Vigouroux joined League of Ireland Premier Division side Waterford on loan. Vigouroux made his debut for Waterford in the club's 2–0 win over St Patrick's Athletic, keeping a clean sheet in the process. Vigouroux was given man of the match in his second game with Waterford in a 2–1 win away to Sligo Rovers. Since joining the club, he quickly established himself in the starting eleven for the side as a first choice goalkeeper. Vigouroux played his last game for Waterford in a 3–0 defeat to Cork City, Vigouroux left after establishing himself as a fan favourite among Waterford supporters.

He was released by Swindon at the end of the 2018–19 season.

=== Everton de Viña del Mar ===
On 31 July 2019, Vigouroux was announced as new goalkeeper for Chilean club Everton from Viña del Mar in a deal until the end of the 2020 season in the Chilean Primera División. In December 2019, he left Chile without having played a single match for Everton after the country's football federation cancelled the tournament due to the social unrest.

=== Leyton Orient ===
On 2 January 2020, Vigouroux signed for Leyton Orient on a free transfer. He signed an 18-month deal.

On 2 October 2021, Vigouroux was playing at Port Vale when he was racially abused by a Port Vale fan, who was later banned from Vale Park. Carol Shanahan apologised to Vigouroux for the incident.

=== Burnley ===
On 27 June 2023, Vigouroux agreed to join newly-promoted, Burnley, signing a three-year deal until 2026.

=== Swansea City ===
On 23 July 2024, Vigouroux agreed to join Swansea City on a two-year deal, with the option to extend by a year. Vigouroux made his debut on 8 August 2024 against Middlesbrough and played every minute of the league and league cup season for Swansea, only sitting out one game in the FA Cup. On 18 March 2025, Vigouroux kept a fourth consecutive clean sheet in a Swansea victory, the first time this had been achieved since 2008. Vigouroux was awarded the club's Men's Best Newcomer Award at the end of season awards.

In October 2025, Vigouroux signed a contract extension through to 2028, this came after a man of the match performance against Southampton, in which he made 8 saves as Swansea drew 0-0.

== International career ==
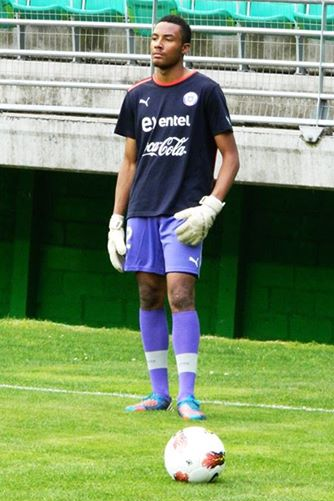
Vigouroux in training for the Chile U20 side.

Vigouroux is eligible to play for England through birth along with Chile and Jamaica through parentage.

Prior to earning any senior caps, Vigouroux pledged his allegiance to Chile and has been involved in Chilean training camps and was part of the 2013 South American Youth Championship.

Vigouroux received his first international call-up for Chile in August 2018 for friendlies against Japan and South Korea. Later, he made his debut in the 2026 FIFA World Cup qualification match against Brazil on 4 September 2025.

== Personal life ==
Growing up in Kentish Town, Vigouroux attended St Thomas More Catholic School. At the beginning of his football career, he initially played as a striker before switching role to goalkeeper.

Vigouroux said he idolised his father, who is of Chilean descent, and supported Chelsea growing up. His mother is Jamaican. He also stated that if he were not a footballer, he would have worked as a builder. He was quoted: "If I wanted to be an individual player, I'd play tennis or something like that."

== Career statistics ==
=== Club ===
As of match played 21 March 2026.

Appearances and goals by club, season and competition
Clubs	Season	League			National cup		League cup		Other		Total	
Clubs	Season	Division	Apps	Goals	Apps	Goals	Apps	Goals	Apps	Goals	Apps	Goals
Tottenham Hotspur	2013–14	Premier League	0	0	0	0	0	0	0	0	0	0
Hyde United (loan)	2013–14	Conference Premier	12	0	1	0	—		1	0	14	0
Liverpool	2014–15	Premier League	0	0	0	0	0	0	0	0	0	0
Liverpool	2015–16	Premier League	0	0	0	0	0	0	0	0	0	0
Liverpool	Total		0	0	0	0	0	0	0	0	0	0
Swindon Town (loan)	2015–16	League One	33	0	1	0	1	0	1	0	36	0
Swindon Town	2016–17	League One	43	0	2	0	1	0	0	0	46	0
Swindon Town	2017–18	League Two	14	0	1	0	1	0	1	0	17	0
Swindon Town	2018–19	League Two	29	0	1	0	1	0	0	0	31	0
Swindon Town	Total		86	0	4	0	3	0	1	0	94	0
Waterford (loan)	2018	League of Ireland Premier Division	19	0	0	0	0	0	—		19	0
Everton SADP	2019	Chilean Primera División	0	0	0	0	0	0	—		0	0
Leyton Orient	2019–20	League Two	6	0	0	0	0	0	0	0	6	0
Leyton Orient	2020–21	League Two	46	0	1	0	2	0	0	0	49	0
Leyton Orient	2021–22	League Two	46	0	3	0	1	0	0	0	50	0
Leyton Orient	2022–23	League Two	45	0	1	0	1	0	0	0	47	0
Leyton Orient	Total		143	0	5	0	4	0	0	0	152	0
Burnley	2023–24	Premier League	0	0	0	0	0	0	—		0	0
Burnley	Total		0	0	0	0	0	0	0	0	0	0
Swansea City	2024–25	Championship	46	0	0	0	2	0	0	0	48	0
Swansea City	2025–26	Championship	39	0	0	0	0	0	0	0	39	0
Swansea City	Total		85	0	0	0	2	0	0	0	87	0
Career total			378	0	11	0	10	0	3	0	402	0

=== International ===
As of match played 6 October 2026.

Appearances and goals by national team and year
National team	Year	Apps	Goals
Chile	2025	5	0
Chile	2026	7	0
Total		12	0

== Honours ==
Leyton Orient

- EFL League Two: 2022–23

Individual

- Swindon Town Player of the Season: 2016–17
- Leyton Orient Player of the Season: 2020–21, 2021–22, 2022–23
- EFL League Two Golden Glove: 2022–23
- EFL League Two Team of the Season: 2022–23
- PFA Team of the Year: 2022–23 League Two
