= Matt Young (footballer, born 2003) =

English footballer

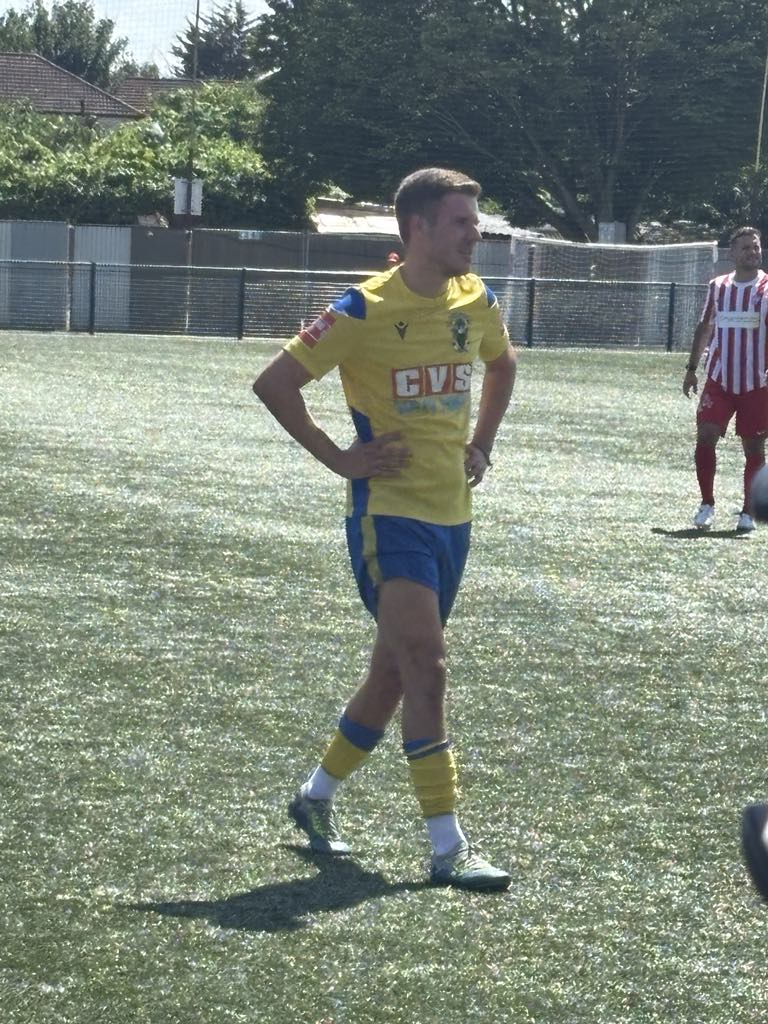
- Matt Young in 2025.

Personal information
- Full name: Matthew Alan Young
- Date of birth: 6 February 2003 (age 23)
- Place of birth: Hatfield, England
- Position: Midfielder

Team information
- Current team: Haringey Borough

Youth career
- –2021: Leyton Orient

Senior career*
Years	Team	Apps	(Gls)
2021–2023	Leyton Orient	15	(0)
2022	Wealdstone (loan)	0	(0)
2022–2023	→ Haringey Borough (loan)	12	(2)
2023	→ Hemel Hempstead Town (loan)	2	(0)
2023–2024	Haringey Borough	33	(15)
2024–	Folkestone Invicta	0	(0)
- * Club domestic league appearances and goals as of 12:45, 19 June 2024 (UTC)

Matthew Alan Young (born 6 February 2003) is an English professional footballer who plays as a midfielder for Folkestone Invicta.

== Playing career ==
Previously a member of their academy, Young signed his first professional contract with Leyton Orient in May 2021.

Young made his debut for Orient in the 3–0 defeat at Salford City on the last day of the 2020–21 season, as an 84th-minute substitute for Hector Kyprianou.

In June 2022 he joined Wealdstone on loan from Leyton Orient. He departed the club in September 2022 having not made an appearance.

Following the conclusion of the 2022–23 season, Young departed Leyton Orient upon the expiration of his contract, subsequently returning to Isthmian League Premier Division side Haringey Borough.

In June 2024, Young joined Isthmian Premier Division side Folkestone Invicta.

== Statistics ==
As of match played 2 April 2022

Appearances and goals by club, season and competition
Club	Season	League			FA Cup		EFL Cup		Other		Total	
Club	Season	Division	Apps	Goals	Apps	Goals	Apps	Goals	Apps	Goals	Apps	Goals
Leyton Orient	2020–21	League Two	1	0	0	0	0	0	0	0	1	0
Leyton Orient	2021–22	League Two	14	0	2	0	0	0	2 (Note: Appearance(s) in EFL Trophy)	0	18	0
Leyton Orient	Leyton Orient total		15	0	2	0	0	0	2	0	19	0
Wealdstone (loan)	2022–23	National League	0	0	0	0	0	0	0	0	0	0
Total			15	0	2	0	0	0	2	0	19	0
Career total			15	0	2	0	0	0	2	0	19	0
