= Danny Johnson (footballer) =

English footballer (born 1993)

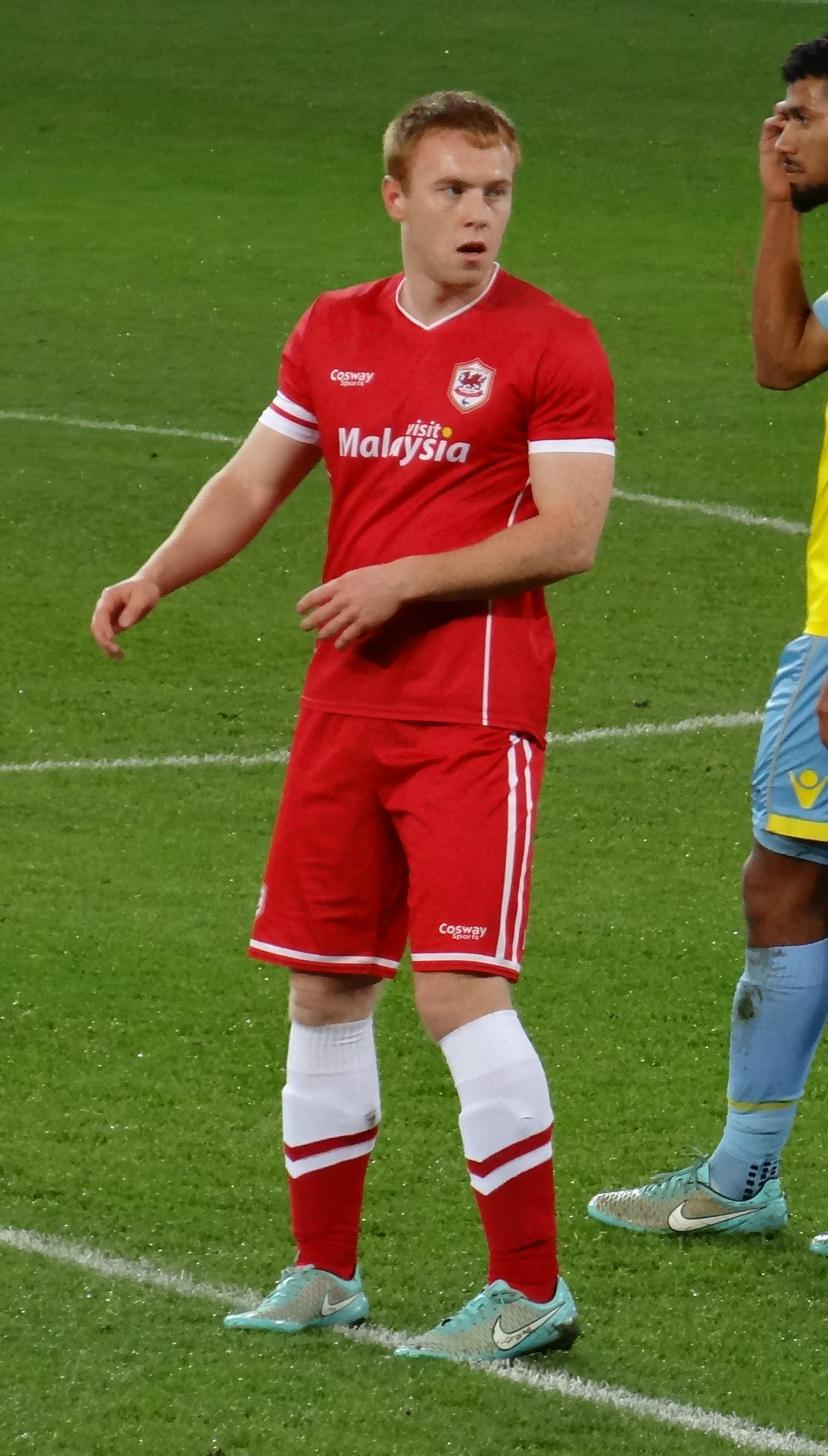
- Johnson playing for Cardiff City in 2014

Personal information
- Full name: Daniel Johnson
- Date of birth: 28 February 1993 (age 33)
- Place of birth: Middlesbrough, England
- Height: 5 ft 10 in (1.78 m)
- Position: Forward

Team information
- Current team: Spennymoor Town
- Number: 39

Youth career
- Middlesbrough
- 2010–2011: Hartlepool United

Senior career*
Years	Team	Apps	(Gls)
2011–2012	Real Murcia B		
2012	Harrogate Town	2	(0)
2012–2013	Billingham Synthonia	17	(9)
2013–2014	Guisborough Town	48	(51)
2014–2015	Cardiff City	0	(0)
2014	→ Tranmere Rovers (loan)	4	(0)
2015	→ Stevenage (loan)	4	(0)
2015–2018	Gateshead	110	(44)
2018–2019	Motherwell	22	(6)
2019–2020	Dundee	19	(5)
2020–2021	Leyton Orient	48	(19)
2021–2023	Mansfield Town	30	(5)
2022–2023	→ Walsall (loan)	22	(12)
2023–2025	Walsall	47	(10)
2025–2026	Hartlepool United	27	(0)
2026–	Spennymoor Town	10	(3)
- * Club domestic league appearances and goals as of 19:59, 31 October 2026 (UTC)

Daniel Johnson (born 28 February 1993) is an English professional footballer, who plays as a striker for Spennymoor Town.

Johnson began his career in the youth academies at home-town club Middlesbrough and Hartlepool United but was released by both clubs without making a first-team appearance. After spells with non-league sides Harrogate Town and Billingham Synthonia, Johnson rose to national prominence after a prolific season with Guisborough Town in the Northern Football League, attracting the attention of several Football League clubs, scoring 59 goals during the 2013–14 season.

His exploits for Guisborough saw him join Football League Championship side Cardiff City the following season. However, he did not make a first-team appearance for the club, spending parts of the season out on loan at Football League Two clubs Tranmere Rovers and Stevenage before being released following the expiration of his contract, signing for Gateshead in July 2015. Johnson moved to Motherwell in 2018, where he spent one year before signing for Dundee in July 2019. In January 2020 he signed for league two club Leyton Orient. While with Mansfield, Johnson would go out on loan to Walsall and would have a remarkable scoring season. In 2023 he returned to the Saddlers on a two-year deal. In 2025, he re-joined his former youth team Hartlepool United for a season.

== Club career ==
=== Early career ===
Johnson began his career as a youngster with Middlesbrough and later moved into the youth system at Hartlepool United, scoring 21 goals for the club's youth team during the 2010–11 season, but was released in May 2011 without making a first-team appearance. He moved to Spain with Real Murcia before returning to England, spending time on trial with Rochdale before having a brief spell with Harrogate Town, making his debut against Histon, before being released. He later joined Billingham Synthonia.

=== Guisborough Town ===
In March 2013, Johnson joined Guisborough Town having impressed manager Chris Hardy and scored six goals in nine league appearances at the end of the 2012–13 season. He started the following year in impressive form, scoring six goals in a pre-season friendly against local side Redcar Athletic and added his first competitive hat-trick soon after in a 3–3 draw with Jarrow Roofing in the qualifying rounds of the FA Cup. He went on to enjoy a prolific season at the club, scoring 59 goals in all competitions, helping the side to win the North Riding Senior Cup, scoring the only goal in the final, a 1–0 win over former club Middlesbrough and finishing top scorer in Division One of the Northern Football League. At the end of his prolific 2013–14 season, Johnson received a plethora of awards, including the clubs Managers' Player of the Year, the Northern Football League's Young Player of the Year award and BBC Newcastle's Player of the Year award.

=== Cardiff City ===
Johnson's scoring exploits for Guisborough attracted interest from numerous clubs including his former club Middlesbrough, where he had two spells training with the first team, Huddersfield Town and Carlisle United before eventually signing for Football League Championship side Cardiff City after scoring for the club's development squad during a pre-season tour against FK Sarajevo. Following his return to professional football, Guisborough manager Chris Hardy commented ""He is an out-and-out goal scorer and more mature now than when he was in the pro game before""

After spending the opening months of the season in the sides development squad, Johnson signed for Football League Two side Tranmere Rovers on an initial one-month loan deal in October 2014. He made his professional debut soon after in a 0–0 draw with Mansfield Town on 21 October 2014, playing 71 minutes before being replaced by George Donnelly, and scored his first professional goal on 11 November in a 2–1 win over Bury in the Football League Trophy. He made just one more appearance for the club before returning to Cardiff.

After continuing to score regularly for Cardiff's under-21 development squad, Johnson was again loaned out, returning to League Two with Stevenage for an initial one month loan deal on 2 February. He made one start for the club and three brief substitute appearances without scoring before returning to Cardiff in late March. At the end of the season, Johnson was not offered a new contract with Cardiff and was subsequently released.

=== Gateshead ===
Following his release, Johnson spent time on trial with League Two side York City, appearing in pre-season friendly matches against Leeds United and Middlesbrough. He was offered a further week long trial at the club following this but instead chose to sign for National League side Gateshead, managed by former Middlesbrough assistant manager Malcolm Crosby, stating that the club had "made him feel wanted from the outset". He made his debut for the club on the opening day of the 2015–16 season, starting in a 2–1 win over Aldershot Town before being replaced by Ryan Bowman after 61 minutes. He scored his first goals for the club soon after with a brace against Guiseley during a 2–0 win on 29 August 2015.

His next goal for the club came three matches later during a 2–1 victory over Eastleigh during which Johnson suffered an injury after a heavy collision with Eastleigh goalkeeper Michael Poke. After a weak header back to Poke by defender Jamie Turley, Johnson beat the Eastleigh goalkeeper to the ball to score but was caught by a strong follow through by Poke. Johnson suffered a bruised lung as well as muscle damage in his ribs and hips and was stretchered off, later claiming that he believed that he was going to suffer a seizure due to the severity of the collision, which kept him out for a month.

=== Motherwell ===
In June 2018, Johnson signed a two-year contract with Scottish Premiership club Motherwell. He started the season well, scoring goals in high-profile matches, including against one against Rangers, a double in a 3–0 victory against Aberdeen, and a late equaliser in a 1–1 draw with Celtic. Despite having a goals to games ratio of one in two start in the first half of the season, a change of formation limited his appearances during the second half of the season.

=== Dundee ===
On 26 July 2019, Johnson moved to Scottish Championship side Dundee on a two-year contract. He scored on his debut for Dundee in a 1–0 victory over Inverness Caledonian Thistle in the Scottish League Cup group stages. Johnson then played a crucial role in the opening game of the league season, scoring two penalties against Dunfermline Athletic to earn his side a point as they came from 2–0 down to draw 2–2, and he scored once again from the spot in a League Cup tie against Aberdeen in a 2–1 defeat. In the first Dundee Derby of the season, Johnson had a goal which would have given Dundee the lead, wrongly disallowed for offside, and his side then went on to lose 6–2. Johnson scored early on in the following match, a 2–1 win over Alloa Athletic.

=== Leyton Orient ===
On 27 January 2020, Johnson signed for EFL League Two side Leyton Orient. He scored his first goal on 22 February, scoring the last goal in a 2–2 draw with Oldham Athletic. At the end of the 2020–21 season, Johnson was offered a new contract to remain in East London.

=== Mansfield Town ===
On 10 June 2021, Johnson was announced to have agreed a two-year deal to join Mansfield Town having rejected the offer of a new contract at Orient.

==== Walsall (loan) ====
On 23 July 2022, Johnson signed for fellow League Two club Walsall on a six-month loan deal. He scored a hat trick on his competitive debut when Walsall beat Hartlepool on the first day of the season on July 30. Johnson would have a very successful short loan spell with Walsall, scoring 15 goals in 30 games. Amid discussion of returning to the Saddlers, Johnson returned to his parent club following the expiry of his loan on 16 January 2023.

==== Return to Mansfield ====
Upon his return to the club, amid claims he was unhappy, Johnson was accused of tying his shoelaces in order to deliberately not celebrate a goal for his side, a claim which he disputed. On 4 March, he scored his first goal since his recall in a 3–1 victory over AFC Wimbledon, celebrating by pretending to tie the laces on his boot in front of the travelling fans.

He was released at the end of the 2022–23 season.

=== Walsall ===
On 28 June 2023, Walsall announced that Danny had signed permanently for Walsall on a two-year deal upon the expiry of his contract on 1 July 2023. He scored on his second debut in 2-1 loss to Morecambe F.C. He also scored in Walsall's first win in the season over Stockport County

After struggling with injuries early in the 2024–25 season, Johnson made his mark on the campaign with a late league winner against Bradford City on 14 September. At the end of the season, Walsall confirmed that Johnson would leave the club.

=== Hartlepool United ===
On 4 July 2025, Johnson joined his former youth club and National League club Hartlepool United on a permanent deal. On 6 May 2026 the club announced he was being released.

=== Spennymoor Town ===
On 10 July 2026, Johnson signed for Spennymoor Town.

== International career ==
In September 2015, Johnson was called up to an England C training camp being held at Warwick University but was forced to withdraw due to injury. In March 2016, Johnson was placed on the standby list for England C's International Challenge Trophy match against Ukraine.

== Career statistics ==
As of match played 31 October 2026

Appearances and goals by club, season and competition
Club	Season	League			FA Cup		League Cup		Other		Total	
Club	Season	Division	Apps	Goals	Apps	Goals	Apps	Goals	Apps	Goals	Apps	Goals
Harrogate Town	2012–13	Conference North	2	0	0	0	—		0	0	2	0
Billingham Synthonia	2012–13	NFL - Div 1	17	9	0	0	—		4	0	21	9
Guisborough Town	2012–13	NFL - Div 1	9	6	0	0	—		0	0	9	6
Guisborough Town	2013–14	NFL - Div 1	39	45	9	9	—		7	5	55	59
Guisborough Town	Total		48	51	9	9	0	0	7	5	64	65
Cardiff City	2014–15	Championship	0	0	0	0	0	0	0	0	0	0
Tranmere Rovers (loan)	2014–15	League Two	4	0	0	0	0	0	1 (Note: Appearance(s) in Football League Trophy)	1	5	1
Stevenage (loan)	2014–15	League Two	4	0	0	0	0	0	0	0	4	0
Gateshead	2015–16	National League	36	13	1	0	—		4 (Note: Appearance(s) in FA Trophy)	2	41	15
Gateshead	2016–17	National League	38	18	1	0	—		1	0	40	18
Gateshead	2017–18	National League	36	13	2	1	—		8	6	46	20
Gateshead	Total		110	44	4	1	0	0	13	8	127	53
Motherwell	2018–19	Scottish Premiership	22	6	1	0	5	2	—		28	8
Dundee	2019–20	Scottish Championship	19	5	1	0	2	2	0	0	22	7
Leyton Orient	2019–20	League Two	6	2	0	0	0	0	0	0	6	2
Leyton Orient	2020–21	League Two	42	17	1	0	2	2	3 (Note: Appearances in EFL Trophy)	1	48	20
Leyton Orient	Total		48	19	1	0	2	2	3	1	54	22
Mansfield Town	2021–22	League Two	22	4	1	0	1	0	2	3	26	7
Mansfield Town	2022–23	League Two	8	1	0	0	0	0	0	0	8	1
Mansfield Town	Total		30	5	1	0	1	0	2	3	34	8
Walsall (loan)	2022–23	League Two	22	12	3	1	2	1	3	1	30	15
Walsall	2023–24	League Two	23	5	2	0	1	0	2	1	28	6
Walsall	2024–25	League Two	24	5	1	0	1	0	4	3	30	8
Walsall	Total		47	10	3	0	2	0	6	4	58	14
Hartlepool United	2025–26	National League	27	0	2	0	0	0	1	0	30	0
Spennymoor Town	2026–27	National League North	10	3	3	4	0	0	0	0	13	7
Career total			410	164	28	15	14	6	40	23	492	209

== Honours ==
Guisborough Town

- North Riding Senior Cup: 2013–14
