= Jordan Thomas (footballer, born January 2001) =

English footballer

Personal information
- Full name: Jordan James Chattenton Thomas
- Date of birth: 2 January 2001 (age 25)
- Place of birth: Greenwich, England
- Height: 1.82 m (6 ft 0 in)
- Position: Defender

Team information
- Current team: Slough Town
- Number: 24

Youth career
- 2010–2015: Charlton Athletic
- 2015–2016: Erith & Belvedere
- 2016–2018: Huddersfield Town
- 2018–2020: Norwich City

Senior career*
Years	Team	Apps	(Gls)
2020–2021	Norwich City	1	(0)
2020–2021	→ Leyton Orient (loan)	1	(0)
2021–2023	Barnet	27	(0)
2023–2024	Hampton & Richmond Borough	41	(3)
2024–2025	Yeovil Town	5	(0)
2024	→ Salisbury (loan)	8	(1)
2024–2025	→ Torquay United (loan)	26	(1)
2025–2026	Torquay United	35	(0)
2026–	Slough Town	0	(0)
- * Club domestic league appearances and goals as of 12:15, 18 September 2026 (UTC)

Jordan James Chattenton Thomas (born 2 January 2001) is an English professional footballer who plays as a defender for National League South club Slough Town. Born in London, he started his career at Charlton Athletic before signing a scholarship at Huddersfield Town.

== Club career ==
=== Charlton Athletic ===
Thomas joined Charlton Athletic at 6 years old, then signed for their academy at age 9. He played there for five years until he was released at age 15.

=== Huddersfield Town ===
Thomas signed a scholarship at Huddersfield Town at the age of 16 after playing one season in the Kent Youth League for Erith & Belvedere. He made his Huddersfield Town U23s debut on 11 September 2017 against Bristol City U23s.

=== Norwich City ===
Aged 18 years Thomas signed his first professional contract for Championship club Norwich City in January 2018, making his Norwich U23s debut on 22 January against Bournemouth U23s.

In the 2019-20 season, Thomas had three times been named as an unused substitute before on 26 July 2020 Daniel Farke gave Thomas his Premier League debut in the last few minutes against Manchester City in a season that saw Norwich City relegated from the top flight of English football.

=== Leyton Orient loan spell ===
In September 2020, Thomas joined Leyton Orient on loan for the 2020–21 season. He made his debut in League Two against Colchester United on 14 November 2020. He played just four times during his loan before being released by Norwich at the end of the season.

=== Non-league ===
Thomas joined Barnet on a two-year deal in July 2021. In March 2023, he joined Hampton & Richmond Borough on a permanent contract.

In June 2024, Thomas joined newly promoted National League side Yeovil Town on a two-year deal. On 6 September 2024, Thomas joined National League South side Salisbury on a one-month loan deal. On 15 November 2024, Thomas joined National League South side Torquay United on loan until the end of the 2024–25 season.

On 26 June 2025, Thomas signed permanently for National League South side Torquay United, agreeing a two-year deal with the club.

On 18 September 2026, Thomas left Torquay United to join fellow National League South side, Slough Town.

== Personal life ==
He is the brother of Bristol Rovers player Dominic Thomas, who retired through injury aged 21.

== Career statistics ==
As of match played 25 April 2026

Appearances and goals by club, season and competition
Club	Season	League			FA Cup		EFL Cup		Other		Total	
Club	Season	Division	Apps	Goals	Apps	Goals	Apps	Goals	Apps	Goals	Apps	Goals
Norwich City	2019–20	Premier League	1	0	0	0	0	0	—		1	0
Norwich City	2020–21	Championship	0	0	0	0	0	0	—		0	0
Norwich City	Total		1	0	0	0	0	0	—		1	0
Norwich City U21	2019–20	—			—		—		2 (Note: Appearance(s) in EFL Trophy)	0	2	0
Leyton Orient (loan)	2020–21	League Two	1	0	0	0	1	0	2	0	4	0
Barnet	2021–22	National League	27	0	1	0	—		4 (Note: One appearance in FA Trophy, three appearances in Middlesex Senior Cup)	0	32	0
Barnet	2022–23	National League	0	0	0	0	—		1 (Note: Appearance(s) in Middlesex Senior Cup)	0	1	0
Barnet	Total		27	0	1	0	—		5	0	33	0
Hampton & Richmond Borough	2022–23	National League South	11	2	0	0	—		0	0	11	2
Hampton & Richmond Borough	2023–24	National League South	30	1	1	0	—		1 (Note: Appearance(s) in FA Trophy)	0	32	1
Hampton & Richmond Borough	Total		41	3	1	0	—		1	0	43	3
Yeovil Town	2024–25	National League	5	0	0	0	—		0	0	5	0
Salisbury (loan)	2024–25	National League South	8	1	2	0	—		0	0	10	1
Torquay United (loan)	2024–25	National League South	26	1	—		—		4 (Note: Three appearances in FA Trophy, one appearance in National League South play-offs)	0	30	1
Torquay United	2025–26	National League South	35	0	1	0	—		2 (Note: One appearance in FA Trophy, one appearance in Devon St Lukes Challenge Cup)	0	38	0
Slough Town	2026–27	National League South	0	0	0	0	—		0	0	0	0
Career total			144	5	5	0	1	0	16	0	166	5
