= Tunji Akinola =

English footballer

Personal information
- Full name: Olatunji Oluwasehun Akinola
- Date of birth: 21 November 1998 (age 27)
- Height: 6 ft 0 in (1.83 m)
- Position: Defender

Team information
- Current team: Woking
- Number: 16

Youth career
- –2006: Brimsdown Rovers
- 2006–2020: West Ham United

Senior career*
Years	Team	Apps	(Gls)
2020–2021	West Ham United	0	(0)
2020–2021	→ Leyton Orient (loan)	33	(0)
2021–2023	Partick Thistle	34	(0)
2023–	Woking	119	(7)
- * Club domestic league appearances and goals as of 19:26 11 October 2026 (UTC)

Olatunji Oluwasehun Akinola (born 21 November 1998) is an English professional footballer who plays as a defender for National League side Woking.

== Career ==
=== West Ham United ===
Akinola first played for Brimsdown Rovers in north London, at around aged seven or eight, before joining West Ham United as a nine-year old.

Akinola was promoted to the under-18 squad at the age of 15, made over 50 appearances at under-23 level and who made his maiden first-team appearance in a pre-season win over Wycombe Wanderers in August 2020. He played in the EFL Trophy against Colchester United in September 2020. His departure from West Ham at the end of June 2021 was announced on 4 June 2021.

=== Leyton Orient ===
Akinola signed for Leyton Orient on loan from West Ham United in October 2020. He made his debut against Barrow on 10 October 2020.

=== Partick Thistle ===
In August 2021, Akinola signed a one-year deal with Scottish Championship club Partick Thistle. Akinola scored the first professional goal of his career, opening the scoring as Thistle won 2–0 away to Stranraer in the Scottish Challenge Cup.

Akinola signed a one-year contract extension with Thistle in January 2022. On 25 January 2023, Akinola left Thistle by mutual consent.

=== Woking ===
In July 2023, following a successful trial period, Akinola joined Woking.

== Style of play ==
During his time at the club, West Ham described Akinola as "tall and composed" and a "ball-playing" centre-back.

== Personal life ==
Akinola is of Nigerian descent.

== Career statistics ==
As of match played 10 November 2026

Appearances and goals by club, season and competition
Club	Season	League			National Cup		League Cup		Other		Total	
Club	Season	Division	Apps	Goals	Apps	Goals	Apps	Goals	Apps	Goals	Apps	Goals
West Ham United U21	2020–21	–							2 (Note: Appearances in the EFL Trophy)	0	2	0
West Ham United	2020–21	Premier League	0	0	—		0	0	—		0	0
Leyton Orient (loan)	2020–21	League Two	33	0	1	0	0	0	0	0	34	0
Partick Thistle	2021–22	Scottish Championship	28	0	2	0	0	0	4 (Note: Two appearances in the Scottish Challenge Cup; two appearances in the Premiership playoffs)	1	34	1
Partick Thistle	2022–23	Scottish Championship	6	0	1	0	3	0	1 (Note: One appearance in the Scottish Challenge Cup.)	0	11	0
Partick Thistle	Total		34	0	3	0	3	0	5	1	45	1
Woking	2023–24	National League	33	4	3	0	—		1 (Note: Appearance(s) in FA Trophy)	0	37	4
Woking	2024–25	National League	40	2	2	0	—		8 (Note: Four appearances in FA Trophy; Four Appearances in National League Cup)	0	50	2
Woking	2025–26	National League	41	1	2	0	—		8 (Note: Four appearances in FA Trophy; Four Appearances in National League Cup)	0	51	1
Woking	2026–27	National League	5	0	0	0	—		4 (Note: 3 Appearance(s) in National League Cup, 1 Appeareance in Surrey Senior Cup)	0	9	0
Woking	Total		119	7	7	0	0	0	21	0	147	7
Career total			184	7	11	0	3	0	28	1	227	8
