= 2020–21 Leyton Orient F.C. season =

Leyton Orient F.C.
2020–21 season
- Chairman: Nigel Travis
- Manager: Ross Embleton (until 27 February); Jobi McAnuff (interim) (from 28 February until 8 May)
- Stadium: Brisbane Road
- League Two: 11th
- FA Cup: First round
- EFL Cup: Third round
- EFL Trophy: Second round
- Top goalscorer: League: Danny Johnson (17); All: Danny Johnson (20)
- Highest home attendance: 1,734 (v. Newport County, 12 Dec 2020)
- Lowest home attendance: 574 (v. Bristol Rovers, 8 Dec 2020)
- Average home league attendance: 1,154 (from 2 matches)
Home colours	Away colours	Third colours

The 2020–21 season is Leyton Orient's 122nd season in their history and the second consecutive season in EFL League Two. Along with League Two, the club also participated in the FA Cup, EFL Cup and EFL Trophy.

The season covers the period from 1 July 2020, to 30 June 2021.

== Transfers ==
=== Transfers in ===
Date	Position	Nationality	Name	From	Fee	Ref.
16 July 2020	DM	(Mali)	Ousseynou Cissé	(England) Gillingham	Free transfer	
15 January 2021	RW	(England)	Dan Kemp	(England) West Ham United	Undisclosed	
30 January 2021	CB	(Northern Ireland)	Adam Thompson	(England) Rotherham United	Free transfer	

=== Loans in ===
Date from	Position	Nationality	Name	From	Date until	Ref.
2 September 2020	RB	(England)	Jordan Thomas	(England) Norwich City	End of season	
6 October 2020	CB	(England)	Olatunji Akinola	(England) West Ham United	End of season	
18 January 2021	CM	(England)	Nick Freeman	(England) Wycombe Wanderers	End of season	
1 February 2021	CF	(England)	Tristan Abrahams	(Wales) Newport County	End of season	

=== Loans out ===
Date from	Position	Nationality	Name	To	Date until	Ref.
3 October 2020	CB	(Republic of Ireland)	Shadrach Ogie	(England) Aldershot Town	End of season	
13 October 2020	DF	(England)	Tristan Francois-Vernal	(England) Harlow Town	November 2020	
13 October 2020	MF	(England)	Antony Papadopoulos	(England) Harlow Town	November 2020	
15 October 2020	DF	(England)	Kyrell Palmer	(England) Saffron Walden Town	November 2020	
30 October 2020	CM	(England)	Brendon Shabani	(England) Concord Rangers	30 November 2020	
30 December 2020	RB	(England)	Myles Judd	(England) Barnet	January 2021	
18 January 2021	RW	(England)	Jordan Maguire-Drew	(England) Crawley Town	End of season	

=== Transfers out ===
Date	Position	Nationality	Name	To	Fee	Ref.
1 July 2020	CF	(England)	James Alabi	(England) Bromley	Released	
1 July 2020	CM	(Northern Ireland)	Dale Gorman	(Northern Ireland) Glentoran	Released	
1 July 2020	CF	(England)	Matt Harrold	Retired		
1 July 2020	GK	(England)	Arthur Janata	(England) East Thurrock United	Released	
2 July 2020	FW	(England)	Malik Mothersille	(England) Chelsea	Free transfer	
8 July 2020	CB	(England)	Marvin Ekpiteta	(England) Blackpool	Free transfer	
7 January 2021	CM	(England)	Josh Wright	(England) Crawley Town	Mutual consent	

== Pre-season ==
22 August 2020 Friendly	Northampton Town	1–0	Leyton Orient	Sixfields
13:00 BST	Hoskins 15'	Report		Stadium: Sixfields Stadium; Attendance: 0

26 August 2020 Friendly	Leyton Orient	1–3	West Ham United Under-23s	Leyton
19:00 BST	Angol 69'	Report	Djú 5'; Kemp 12'; Ling 37' (o.g.)	Stadium: Brisbane Road; Attendance: 0

29 August 2020 Friendly	Leyton Orient	1–0	Gillingham	Leyton
13:00 BST	Johnson 89'	Report		Stadium: Brisbane Road; Attendance: 0

31 August 2020 Friendly	Bishop's Stortford	0–1	Leyton Orient	Bishop's Stortford
15:00 BST			Trialist B 39'	Stadium: Prokit UK Stadium

== Competitions ==
=== EFL League Two ===
==== League table ====
Pos	Team	Pld	W	D	L	GF	GA	GD	Pts	Promotion, qualification or relegation
7	Tranmere Rovers	46	20	13	13	55	50	+5	73	Qualification for League Two play-offs
8	Salford City	46	19	14	13	54	34	+20	71	
9	Exeter City	46	18	16	12	71	50	+21	70	
10	Carlisle United	46	18	12	16	60	51	+9	66	
11	Leyton Orient	46	17	10	19	53	55	−2	61	
12	Crawley Town	46	16	13	17	56	62	−6	61	
13	Port Vale	46	17	9	20	57	57	0	60	
14	Stevenage	46	14	18	14	41	41	0	60	
15	Bradford City	46	16	11	19	48	53	−5	59	

Updated to match(es) played on 31 May 2021. Source: EFL Official Website
Rules for classification: 1) Points; 2) Goal difference; 3) Number of goals scored; 4) Head-to-head results; 5) Wins; 6) Away goals; 7) Penalty points (sec 9.5); 8) 12-point sending off offences

==== Results summary ====
Overall								Home						Away					
Pld	W	D	L	GF	GA	GD	Pts	W	D	L	GF	GA	GD	W	D	L	GF	GA	GD
46	17	10	19	53	55	−2	61	9	7	7	32	25	+7	8	3	12	21	30	−9

Last updated: 8 May 2021.
Source: BBC

==== Results by matchday ====
Matchday	1	2	3	4	5	6	7	8	9	10	11	12	13	14	15	16	17	18	19	20	21	22	23	24	25	26	27	28	29	30	31	32	33	34	35	36	37	38	39	40	41	42	43	44	45	46
Ground	A	H	H	A	A	H	A	A	H	H	A	A	H	H	A	A	H	A	H	A	H	H	H	H	A	A	H	H	A	H	A	A	H	H	A	A	H	A	H	A	A	H	H	A	H	A
Result	W	D	L	D	L	L	W	W	D	W	L	L	W	W	W	L	W	L	L	L	W	W	W	L	L	D	D	D	L	L	W	L	D	D	W	W	W	W	D	L	D	W	L	L	L	L
Position	6	8	17	17	17	18	15	14	13	12	13	14	11	8	6	8	7	10	12	12	10	9	7	9	10	10	10	11	12	14	13	14	14	14	14	11	9	9	9	12	11	9	10	11	11	11

Updated to match(es) played on 8 May 2021. Source: 11v11 for league tables and fixtures
A = Away; H = Home; W = Win; D = Draw; L = Loss

==== Matches ====
Win Draw Loss Postponed

The 2020–21 season fixtures were released on 21 August.

12 September 2020 1	Oldham Athletic	0–1	Leyton Orient	Oldham
15:00 BST		Report	Brophy (yellow card) 25'; Happe (yellow card) 52'; Johnson 89'	Stadium: Boundary Park; Attendance: 0 Referee: Declan Bourne

19 September 2020 2	Leyton Orient	2–2	Mansfield Town	Leyton
15:00 BST	Brophy (yellow card) 51'; Johnson 82'; Sotiriou (yellow card) 89' (goal) 90+2'	Report	Bowery 52' (pen.); O'Keeffe (yellow card) 55'; Cook 72' (yellow card) 85'	Stadium: Brisbane Road; Attendance: 0 Referee: David Rock

3 October 2020 3	Leyton Orient	0–2	Cheltenham Town	Leyton
15:00 BST	Brophy (yellow card) 82'; McAnuff (yellow card) 83'; Cissé (yellow card) 85'; Sotiriou (yellow card) 90+1'; Coulson (yellow card) 90+2'	Report	Ling 16' (o.g.); Azaz 29'; Boyle (yellow card) 57'; Bonds (yellow card) 82'	Stadium: Brisbane Road; Attendance: 0 Referee: Peter Wright

10 October 2020 4	Barrow	1–1	Leyton Orient	Barrow-in-Furness
15:00 BST	Kay 16' (yellow card) 68'; Hardcastle (yellow card) 61'; Beadling (yellow card) 82'; Angus (yellow card) 83'	Report	Ling (yellow card) 7'; Happe (red card) 9'; Johnson 50' (yellow card) 61'; Cissé (yellow card) 61'; Dennis (yellow card) 63'; McAnuff (yellow card) 76'; Wilkinson (yellow card) 87'	Stadium: Holker Street; Attendance: 0 Referee: Andy Haines

13 October 2020 5	Walsall	2–1	Leyton Orient	Bescot
19:00 BST	Holden 25' (yellow card) 89'; Lavery (penalty missed) 34'; Adebayo 61'; Guthrie (yellow card) 67'; Kinsella (yellow card) 79'; McDonald (yellow card) 90+4'; Osadebe (yellow card) 90+6'	Report	Johnson 15'; Widdowson (yellow card) 90+6'; Vigouroux (yellow card) 90+6'	Stadium: Bescot Stadium; Attendance: 0 Referee: Christopher Pollard

17 October 2020 6	Leyton Orient	2–3	Grimsby Town	Leyton
17:30 BST	Wilkinson 5'; Wright (yellow card) 39'; Maguire-Drew 74' (yellow card) 75'; Clay (yellow card) 90'; McAnuff (yellow card) 90+3'	Report	Waterfall 22'; Williams 32'; Clifton (yellow card) 86'; Gibson 90+1' (pen.)	Stadium: Brisbane Road; Attendance: 0 Referee: Tom Nield

20 October 2020 7	Tranmere Rovers	0–1	Leyton Orient	Birkenhead
19:00 BST		Report	Johnson 71'	Stadium: Prenton Park; Attendance: 0 Referee: Sam Barrott

24 October 2020 8	Stevenage	0–2	Leyton Orient	Stevenage
15:00 BST	Hutton (yellow card) 70'; Oteh (yellow card) 90+2'	Report	Maguire-Drew 62'; Wilkinson 66'	Stadium: Broadhall Way; Attendance: 0 Referee: Darren Drysdale

27 October 2020 9	Leyton Orient	1–1	Exeter City	Leyton
19:00 GMT	Wilkinson 4' (yellow card) 23'; Widdowson (yellow card) 88'; Cissé (yellow card) 90+3'	Report	Taylor 47'	Stadium: Brisbane Road; Attendance: 0 Referee: Robert Lewis

31 October 2020 10	Leyton Orient	4–0	Bolton Wanderers	Leyton
15:00 GMT	Johnson 8'; McAnuff 41'; Wilkinson 44'; Clay 57'; Cissé (yellow card) 79'	Report	Sarcevic (yellow card) 13'; Santos (yellow card) 43'; White (yellow card) 88'	Stadium: Brisbane Road; Attendance: 0 Referee: Brett Huxtable

3 November 2020 11	Forest Green Rovers	2–1	Leyton Orient	Nailsworth
19:00 GMT	Bailey 30'; Adams (yellow card) 79'; Stevens 82'; Wilson (yellow card) 90+1'	Report	Turley (yellow card) 29'; Wright 41'	Stadium: The New Lawn; Attendance: 0 Referee: Andy Woolmer

14 November 2020 12	Colchester United	2–1	Leyton Orient	Colchester
15:00 GMT	Brown 10', 72'; Welch-Hayes (yellow card) 65'	Report	Wilkinson 88'	Stadium: Colchester Community Stadium; Attendance: 0 Referee: Carl Boyeson

21 November 2020 13	Leyton Orient	3–0	Harrogate Town	Leyton
15:00 GMT	Johnson 18', 31', 73'; Coulson (yellow card) 26'; Widdowson (yellow card) 70'	Report	Burrell (yellow card) 68'; Jones (yellow card) 80'	Stadium: Brisbane Road; Attendance: 0 Referee: Neil Hair

24 November 2020 14	Leyton Orient	1–0	Bradford City	Leyton
19:00 GMT	Happe 64'	Report	French (yellow card) 20'; Staunton (yellow card) 41'; O'Connor (yellow card) 78'	Stadium: Brisbane Road; Attendance: 0 Referee: Sam Allison

28 November 2020 15	Port Vale	2–3	Leyton Orient	Burslem
13:00 GMT	Legge 8' (yellow card) 90+1'; Montaño 76' (yellow card) 90+3'	Report	Johnson 11'; Wilkinson 31'; Happe (yellow card) 45+1'; Brophy 85'	Stadium: Vale Park; Attendance: 0 Referee: Peter Wright

5 December 2020 16	Scunthorpe United	2–0	Leyton Orient	Scunthorpe
13:00 GMT	Loft 28'; Beestin 78'	Report	Johnson (penalty missed) 7' (yellow card) 79'; Widdowson (yellow card) 33'; Wilkinson (yellow card) 43'; Brophy (yellow card) 83'; McAnuff (yellow card) 84'	Stadium: Glanford Park; Attendance: 0 Referee: Ross Joyce

12 December 2020 17	Leyton Orient	2–1	Newport County	Leyton
15:00 GMT	Johnson 62'; Brophy 70'; Widdowson (yellow card) 87'; Angol (yellow card) 90+5'	Report	Proctor 20'; Bennett (yellow card) 43'; Shephard (yellow card) 47'; Lewis (yellow card) 66'; Twine (yellow card) 74'; Abrahams (yellow card) 84'	Stadium: Brisbane Road; Attendance: 1,734; Referee: Tom Nield

15 December 2020 18	Morecambe	2–1	Leyton Orient	Morecambe
18:30 GMT	Davis (yellow card) 11'; Lavelle 56' (yellow card) 78'; Mendes Gomes 73'; Songo'o (yellow card) 86'; Leitch-Smith (yellow card) 90+3'	Report	Johnson 18'; Angol (yellow card) 44'; Clay (yellow card) 68'; Sotiriou (yellow card) 86'; Vigouroux (yellow card) 89'	Stadium: Globe Arena; Attendance: 0

19 December 2020 19	Leyton Orient	1–2	Crawley Town	Leyton
15:00 GMT	Dallison 41' (o.g.); Happe (yellow card) 44'	Report	Coulson 15' (o.g.); Davies (yellow card) 36'; Watters 82'	Stadium: Brisbane Road; Attendance: 0 Referee: Scott Oldham

26 December 2020 20	Cambridge United	2–1	Leyton Orient	Cambridge
13:00 GMT	Hannant (yellow card) 33'; Hoolahan 55'; Mullin 57'; May (yellow card) 84'	Report	Johnson 23'; Happe (yellow card) 63'	Stadium: Abbey Stadium; Attendance: 0 Referee: Will Finnie

29 December 2020 21	Leyton Orient	2–0	Southend United	Leyton
19:00 GMT	McAnuff 53'; Wilkinson 78'; Angol (yellow card) 90'; Johnson (yellow card) 90+1'	Report	Dieng (yellow card) 52'; Bwomono (yellow card) 53'	Stadium: Brisbane Road; Attendance: 0 Referee: Craig Hicks

2 January 2021 22	Leyton Orient	1–0	Salford City	Leyton
15:00 GMT	Johnson 31'; Brophy (yellow card) 62'; Ling (yellow card) 85'	Report	Lowe (yellow card) 35'	Stadium: Brisbane Road; Attendance: 0 Referee: Carl Brook

16 January 2021 23	Leyton Orient	2–0	Morecambe	Leyton
15:00 GMT	Sotiriou (yellow card) 60'; Angol (yellow card) 83', (goal) 90+2'; Knight-Percival 88' (o.g.)	Report	Lyons (yellow card) 90+1'	Stadium: Brisbane Road; Attendance: 0 Referee: Brett Huxtable

23 January 2021 24	Leyton Orient	0–1	Forest Green Rovers	Leyton
15:00 GMT	McAnuff (yellow card) 32'; Happe (yellow card) 54' (yellow-red card) 64'; Brophy (yellow card) 69'	Report	Cadden 23'; Adams (yellow card) 29'; Cargill (yellow card) 45+2'; Davison (yellow card) 90+1'	Stadium: Brisbane Road; Attendance: 0 Referee: John Busby

30 January 2021 25	Bolton Wanderers	2–0	Leyton Orient	Horwich
15:00 GMT	Brophy 67' (o.g.); Doyle 69'	Report		Stadium: University of Bolton Stadium; Attendance: 0 Referee: Sam Purkiss

2 February 2021 26	Crawley Town	0–0	Leyton Orient	Crawley
18:00 GMT	Nichols (penalty missed) 3'; Rodari (yellow card) 90+4'	Report	Thompson (yellow card) 29'; Kyprianou (red card) 30'; Wilkinson (yellow card) 85'; Clay (yellow card) 88'; Brophy (yellow card) 90+4'	Stadium: Broadfield Stadium; Attendance: 0 Referee: Kevin Johnson

6 February 2021 27	Leyton Orient	0–0	Colchester United	Leyton
15:00 GMT		Report	Doherty (yellow card) 33'; Chilvers (yellow card) 63'	Stadium: Brisbane Road; Attendance: 0 Referee: Neil Hair

20 February 2021 28	Leyton Orient	1–1	Port Vale	Leyton
15:00 GMT	Brophy (yellow card) 48'; Kemp 63'; McAnuff (yellow card) 80'	Report	Worrall 47'	Stadium: Brisbane Road; Attendance: 0 Referee: Graham Salisbury

23 February 2021 29	Bradford City	1–0	Leyton Orient	Bradford
19:00 GMT	Sutton (yellow card) 38'; O'Connor (yellow card) 62'; Cooke 81' (pen.)	Report	Cisse (yellow card) 72'	Stadium: Valley Parade; Attendance: 0 Referee: James Adcock

27 February 2021 30	Leyton Orient	1–3	Tranmere Rovers	Leyton
15:00 GMT	McAnuff (yellow card) 41'; Turley 68'; Akinola (yellow card) 71'	Report	Lewis 24'; Woolery 56'; Morris 63'; Vaughan (yellow card) 73'; Feeney (yellow card) 90+5'	Stadium: Brisbane Road; Attendance: 0 Referee: Antony Coggins

2 March 2021 31	Grimsby Town	0–1	Leyton Orient	Cleethorpes
19:00 GMT		Report	Happe 20'	Stadium: Blundell Park; Attendance: 0 Referee: Steve Martin

6 March 2021 32	Exeter City	4–0	Leyton Orient	Exeter
13:00 GMT	Randall 11'; Jay 13', 42', 50' (pen.)	Report	Widdowson (yellow card) 27'; Akinola (yellow card) 49'; Turley (yellow card) 75'; Clay (yellow card) 86'	Stadium: St James Park; Attendance: 0 Referee: Charles Breakspear

9 March 2021 33	Leyton Orient	0–0	Stevenage	Leyton
19:00 GMT	Turley (yellow card) 52'; Brophy (yellow card) 79'	Report	Newton (yellow card) 58'; Coker (yellow card) 90+2'	Stadium: Brisbane Road; Attendance: 0 Referee: Alan Young

13 March 2021 34	Leyton Orient	1–1	Scunthorpe United	Leyton
13:00 GMT	Cissé 34'; Brophy (yellow card) 50'; Clay (yellow card) 62'; Johnson (yellow card) 90+3'	Report	Loft 12'; Karacan (yellow card) 78'	Stadium: Brisbane Road; Attendance: 0 Referee: Ben Speedie

20 March 2021 35	Newport County	0–1	Leyton Orient	Cardiff
13:00 GMT	Labadie (yellow card) 47'; Ledley (yellow card) 71'	Report	Kemp (yellow card) 31'; Cissé (yellow card) 38'; Wilkinson 61', (yellow card) 86'; McAnuff (yellow card) 68'	Stadium: Cardiff City Stadium; Attendance: 0 Referee: Sam Barrott

23 March 2021 36	Carlisle United	0–1	Leyton Orient	Carlisle
18:30 GMT		Report	Wilkinson 88'	Stadium: Brunton Park; Attendance: 0 Referee: James Bell

27 March 2021 37	Leyton Orient	2–1	Oldham Athletic	Leyton
15:00 GMT	Wilkinson 8'; Kemp 43'; Abrahams (yellow card) 90+1'	Report	McCalmont 61', (yellow card) 90+2'; McAleny (yellow card) 74'; Diarra (yellow card) 90+4'	Stadium: Brisbane Road; Attendance: 0 Referee: Darren Drysdale

2 April 2021 38	Mansfield Town	0–2	Leyton Orient	Mansfield
15:00 BST	Sweeney (yellow card) 89'	Report	Johnson 5', 77'; Kemp (yellow card) 86'	Stadium: Field Mill; Attendance: 0 Referee: Bobby Madley

5 April 2021 39	Leyton Orient	0–0	Walsall	Leyton
15:00 BST	Widdowson (yellow card) 52'; Wilkinson (yellow card) 90+2'	Report	Melbourne (yellow card) 23'	Stadium: Brisbane Road; Attendance: 0 Referee: Paul Howard

10 April 2021 40	Cheltenham Town	1–0	Leyton Orient	Cheltenham
15:00 BST	Thomas (yellow card) 17', (goal) 31' (pen.)	Report	Vigouroux (yellow card) 30'; Turley (yellow card) 60'	Stadium: Whaddon Road; Attendance: 0 Referee: Thomas Bramall

13 April 2021 41	Harrogate Town	2–2	Leyton Orient	Harrogate
19:00 BST	Smith (yellow card) 15'; Jones 58'; Muldoon (penalty missed) 73'; McPake 74'	Report	Wilkinson 46', (yellow card) 57'; Johnson (yellow card) 56', (goal) 63'	Stadium: Wetherby Road; Attendance: 0 Referee: Anthony Backhouse

17 April 2021 42	Leyton Orient	2–0	Barrow	Leyton
12:30 BST	Happe 52'; Kemp 63'	Report	Brough (yellow card) 34'	Stadium: Brisbane Road; Attendance: 0 Referee: Chris Sarginson

20 April 2021 43	Leyton Orient	2–4	Cambridge United	Leyton
19:00 BST	Johnson (yellow card) 21'; Kemp 45+1'; Turley (yellow card) 49'; Drysdale 73' (o.g.); Akinola (yellow card) 78'; Vigouroux (yellow card) 90+6'	Report	Ironside 19', 80'; Tracey 64'; Mullin 69' (pen.)	Stadium: Brisbane Road; Attendance: 0 Referee: Christopher Pollard

24 April 2021 44	Southend United	2–1	Leyton Orient	Southend-on-Sea
15:00 BST	Cordner 42', (yellow card) 83'; Rush 76'; Hart (yellow card) 80'; Walsh (yellow card) 82'	Report	Dennis 45+3'	Stadium: Roots Hall; Attendance: 0 Referee: Trevor Kettle

1 May 2021 45	Leyton Orient	2–3	Carlisle United	Leyton
15:00 BST	Wilkinson 3'; Happe (yellow card) 18'; Kemp (penalty missed) 24', 45+3'; Dennis (yellow card) 62'; Clay (yellow card) 89'	Report	Zanzala (penalty missed) 19'; Mellish 42', (yellow card) 89'; Alessandra 54' (pen.); Walker (yellow card) 80'; Tanner 90+1'	Stadium: Breyer Group Stadium; Attendance: 0 Referee: Sam Allison

8 May 2021 46	Salford City	3–0	Leyton Orient	Salford
16:00 BST	Boyd (penalty missed) 14'; Gotts 42'; Thomas-Asante 50', 66'; Golden (yellow card) 68'	Report	Happe (yellow card) 14'; Akinola (yellow card) 80'	Stadium: Moor Lane; Attendance: 0 Referee: Darren Drysdale

=== FA Cup ===
Win Draw Loss

The draw for the first round was made on Monday 26, October.

7 November 2020 First round	Leyton Orient	1–2	Newport County	Leyton
15:00 GMT	Kyprianou 40'; McAnuff (yellow card) 69'; Turley (yellow card) 75'	Report	Proctor (yellow card) 27'; Baker 37'; Devitt 77'	Stadium: Brisbane Road; Attendance: 0 Referee: James Adcock

=== EFL Cup ===
Win Draw Loss

The first round draw was made on 18 August, live on Sky Sports, by Paul Merson. The draw for both the second and third round were confirmed on September 6, live on Sky Sports by Phil Babb.

5 September 2020 First round	Forest Green Rovers	1–2	Leyton Orient	Nailsworth
15:00 BST	Happe 23' (o.g.); Adams (yellow card) 88'	Report	Johnson 49'; Wilkinson 52'; McAnuff (yellow card) 80'; Angol (yellow card) 90+2'	Stadium: The New Lawn; Attendance: 0 Referee: Craig Hicks

15 September 2020 Second round	Leyton Orient	3–2	Plymouth Argyle	Leyton
19:45 BST	Dennis 55'; McAnuff 74'; Johnson 90+3'	Report	Camará 19'; Watts 34'	Stadium: Brisbane Road; Attendance: 0 Referee: Josh Smith

22 September 2020 Third round	Leyton Orient	W/O	Tottenham Hotspur	Leyton
19:45 BST				Stadium: Brisbane Road

=== EFL Trophy ===
Win Draw Loss

The regional group stage draw was confirmed on 18 August. The second round draw was made by Matt Murray on 20 November, at St Andrew's.

Pos	Div	Team	Pld	W	PW	PL	L	GF	GA	GD	Pts	Qualification
1	L2	Leyton Orient	3	2	0	0	1	6	5	+1	6	Advance to Round 2
2	L1	AFC Wimbledon	3	2	0	0	1	4	3	+1	6	Advance to Round 2
3	L1	Charlton Athletic	3	1	1	0	1	5	4	+1	5	
4	ACA	Brighton & Hove Albion U21	3	0	0	1	2	3	6	−3	1	

Source: EFL.com

8 September 2020 Group stage	Leyton Orient	3–2	Brighton & Hove Albion U21	Leyton
19:00 GMT	Ling 36'; Johnson 55'; Angol (penalty missed) 90+2'; Wilkinson 90+5'	Report	Wilson 84', 88'	Stadium: Brisbane Road; Attendance: 0 Referee: Sam Purkiss

6 October 2020 Group stage	Leyton Orient	2–0	AFC Wimbledon	Leyton
19:00 BST	Angol 32' (pen.); Wilkinson 75'	Report		Stadium: Brisbane Road; Attendance: 0 Referee: Sam Allison

10 November 2020 Group stage	Charlton Athletic	3–1	Leyton Orient	Charlton
19:00 GMT	Aouachria 12' (yellow card) 45+1'; Aidoo (yellow card) 15'; Barker (yellow card) 29'; Mingi 64'; Maddison 74'; Morgan (yellow card) 81'	Report	Wright (yellow card) 49'; Dennis 67'	Stadium: The Valley; Attendance: 0 Referee: Charles Breakspear

8 December 2020 Second round	Leyton Orient	1–2	Bristol Rovers	Leyton
19:00 GMT	Baldwin 28' (o.g.); Turley (red card) 55'; Kyprianou (yellow card) 70'; Johnson (yellow card) 86'; Clay (yellow card) 90+1'	Report	Koiki 12'; Sargeant 29' (o.g.); Upson (yellow card) 78'; Hare (yellow card) 81'; Liddle (yellow card) 90+1'; Ayunga (yellow card) 90+7'	Stadium: Brisbane Road; Attendance: 924; Referee: Alan Young

== Player statistics ==
No.	Pos	Nat	Player	Total		League Two		FA Cup		EFL Cup		EFL Trophy	
No.	Pos	Nat	Player	Apps	Goals	Apps	Goals	Apps	Goals	Apps	Goals	Apps	Goals
Goalkeepers
1	GK	(England) ENG	Sam Sargeant	4	0	0	0	0	0	0	0	4	0
22	GK	(Chile) CHI	Lawrence Vigouroux	49	0	46	0	1	0	2	0	0	0
Defenders
2	DF	(England) ENG	Sam Ling	34	1	27+3	0	0	0	1	0	3	1
3	DF	(England) ENG	Joe Widdowson	33	0	21+5	0	1	0	1+1	0	4	0
5	DF	(England) ENG	Dan Happe	43	3	39+1	3	0	0	1	0	2	0
6	DF	(England) ENG	Josh Coulson	24	0	19+1	0	1	0	2	0	1	0
12	DF	(England) ENG	Jordan Thomas (on loan from Norwich City)	4	0	1	0	0	0	1	0	2	0
18	DF	(England) ENG	Olatunji Akinola (on loan from West Ham United)	34	0	31+2	0	1	0	0	0	0	0
23	DF	(England) ENG	Jamie Turley	23	1	15+3	1	1	0	1	0	3	0
24	DF	(England) ENG	Jayden Sweeney	3	0	0+1	0	0	0	0	0	1+1	0
29	DF	(Northern Ireland) NIR	Adam Thompson	6	0	6	0	0	0	0	0	0	0
Midfielders
4	MF	(Mali) MLI	Ousseynou Cissé	44	1	40+2	1	0	0	1	0	0+1	0
7	MF	(Jamaica) JAM	Jobi McAnuff	43	3	26+14	2	1	0	2	1	0	0
8	MF	(England) ENG	Craig Clay	43	1	31+7	1	0+1	0	1	0	2+1	0
11	MF	(England) ENG	James Dayton	19	0	4+8	0	1	0	0+2	0	4	0
15	MF	(England) ENG	Dan Kemp	24	5	22+2	5	0	0	0	0	0	0
16	MF	(England) ENG	James Brophy	50	2	44	2	0+1	0	1+1	0	1+2	0
26	MF	(Cyprus) CYP	Hector Kyprianou	25	1	12+10	0	1	1	0	0	2	0
28	MF	(England) ENG	Nick Freeman (on loan from Wycombe Wanderers)	15	0	10+5	0	0	0	0	0	0	0
46	MF	(England) ENG	Matt Young	1	0	0+1	0	0	0	0	0	0	0
Forwards
9	FW	(Republic of Ireland) IRL	Conor Wilkinson	46	15	40+2	12	1	0	1	1	0+2	2
17	FW	(England) ENG	Louis Dennis	28	3	11+13	1	1	0	1	1	1+1	1
19	FW	(England) ENG	Lee Angol	17	2	7+5	1	0	0	2	0	2+1	1
20	FW	(Cyprus) CYP	Ruel Sotiriou	25	1	8+14	1	0	0	1	0	2	0
35	FW	(England) ENG	Tristan Abrahams (on loan from Newport County)	14	0	3+11	0	0	0	0	0	0	0
39	FW	(England) ENG	Danny Johnson	48	20	36+6	17	1	0	1+1	2	1+2	1
Out on Loan
10	MF	(England) ENG	Jordan Maguire-Drew	19	2	3+10	2	0+1	0	1	0	4	0
14	DF	(England) ENG	Myles Judd	1	0	0	0	0	0	0	0	1	0
21	MF	(Albania) ALB	Brendon Shabani	0	0	0	0	0	0	0	0	0	0
25	DF	(Republic of Ireland) IRL	Shadrach Ogie	1	0	0	0	0	0	0	0	1	0
Left During the Season
44	MF	(England) ENG	Josh Wright	15	1	4+5	1	0	0	1+1	0	3+1	0

Last updated: 9 May 2021
Source: Competitions

=== Top scorers ===
Includes all competitive matches. The list is sorted by squad number when total goals are equal.

Last updated 9 May 2021.

Rank	No.	Nationality	Player	League Two	FA Cup	EFL Cup	EFL Trophy	Total
1	39	(England)	Danny Johnson	17	0	2	1	20
2	9	(Republic of Ireland)	Conor Wilkinson	12	0	1	2	15
3	15	(England)	Dan Kemp	5	0	0	0	5
4	5	(England)	Dan Happe	3	0	0	0	3
4	7	(Jamaica)	Jobi McAnuff	2	0	1	0	3
4	17	(England)	Louis Dennis	1	0	1	1	3
6	10	(England)	Jordan Maguire-Drew	2	0	0	0	2
6	16	(England)	James Brophy	2	0	0	0	2
6	19	(England)	Lee Angol	1	0	0	1	2
6	2	(England)	Sam Ling	0	0	0	1	1
6	4	(Mali)	Ousseynou Cissé	1	0	0	0	1
6	8	(England)	Craig Clay	1	0	0	0	1
6	20	(Cyprus)	Ruel Sotiriou	1	0	0	0	1
6	23	(England)	Jamie Turley	1	0	0	0	1
6	26	(Cyprus)	Hector Kyprianou	0	1	0	0	1
6	44	(England)	Josh Wright	1	0	0	0	1
Own goals				3	0	0	1	4
TOTALS				52	1	5	7	65
