= Jamie Turley =

English footballer

Personal information
- Full name: Jamie Lee Peter Turley
- Date of birth: 7 April 1990 (age 36)
- Place of birth: Reading, England
- Height: 6 ft 1 in (1.85 m)
- Position: Defender

Youth career
- 2008–2009: Wycombe Wanderers

Senior career*
Years	Team	Apps	(Gls)
2009–2011	Salisbury City	31	(1)
2011–2014	Forest Green Rovers	97	(6)
2014–2016	Eastleigh	49	(3)
2016–2018	Newport County	6	(1)
2017–2018	→ Boreham Wood (loan)	31	(3)
2018–2019	Notts County	18	(0)
2019–2021	Leyton Orient	36	(2)
2021–2022	Barnet	13	(0)
Total		281	(16)

International career
2012–2013	England C	4	(0)
- * Club domestic league appearances and goals

Jamie Lee Peter Turley (born 7 April 1990) is an English former professional footballer who played as a defender.

== Career ==
Turley began his career as a trainee with Wycombe Wanderers but he did not play a competitive match for them and in July 2009 he joined Salisbury City.

In June 2011, he joined Forest Green Rovers. He made his debut for Forest Green on 16 August 2011 in a 1–1 away draw against Luton Town. On his second appearance for the club, against Alfreton Town, he scored his first goal for Forest Green in a 6–1 away win. In April 2014, it was announced that he had left the club after a spell lasting three seasons.

In September 2014, after a spell training with Bristol Rovers, he joined Eastleigh.

In July 2016, Turley joined League Two club Newport County on a two-year contract. Turley made his football league debut for Newport County in a 3–2 defeat to Mansfield Town in League Two on 6 August. He scored his first goal for Newport in the League Two match against Leyton Orient on 13 August.

On 2 August 2017, Turley joined Boreham Wood on loan for the 2017–18 season. He was released by Newport at the end of the 2017–18 season.

On 14 September 2018, Turley signed for Notts County.

On 16 January 2019 Turley signed for Leyton Orient for the remainder of the season He was released at the end of the 2020-21 season.

Turley signed for Barnet in July 2021.

In July 2022, Turley was forced to retire from professional football due to injury.

== International ==
In the 2012–13 season, Turley captained the England C team to semi-final of the International Challenge Trophy, losing the semi-final 1–0 to Turkey. In February 2013, he was selected as England 'C' Player of the Year.

== Career statistics ==
=== Club ===
Appearances and goals by club, season and competition
Club	Season	League			FA Cup		League Cup		Other		Total	
Club	Season	Division	Apps	Goals	Apps	Goals	Apps	Goals	Apps	Goals	Apps	Goals
Salisbury City	2009–10	Conference Premier	31	1	1	0	~	~	0	0	32	1
Salisbury City	2010–11	Conference Premier	0	0	1	0	~	~	4 (Note: Appearances in the FA Trophy)	0	5	0
Salisbury City	Salisbury City		31	1	2	0	~	~	4	0	37	1
Forest Green Rovers	2011–12	Conference Premier	39	2	1	0	~	~	2	0	42	2
Forest Green Rovers	2012–13	Conference Premier	37	3	3	0	~	~	1	0	41	3
Forest Green Rovers	2013–14	Conference Premier	21	1	1	0	~	~	4	0	26	1
Forest Green Rovers	Forest Green		97	6	5	0	~	~	7	0	109	6
Eastleigh	2014–15	Conference Premier	14	2	0	0	~	~	0	0	14	2
Eastleigh	2015–16	Conference Premier	35	1	2	0	~	~	1	0	38	1
Eastleigh	Eastleigh		49	3	2	0	~	~	1	0	52	3
Newport County	2016–17	League Two	6	1	0	0	1	0	0	0	7	1
Boreham Wood (loan)	2017–18	National League	31	3	1	0	~	~	5 (Note: Four appearances in the FA Trophy, one appearance and one goal in the National League play-offs)	1	36	4
Notts County	2018–19	League Two	18	0	1	0	0	0	0	0	19	0
Leyton Orient	2018–19	National League	10	0	0	0	~	~	4	1	14	1
Leyton Orient	2019–20	League Two	8	1	0	0	0	0	2 (Note: Appearances in the EFL Trophy)	0	10	1
Leyton Orient	2020–21	League Two	18	1	1	0	1	0	3	0	23	1
Leyton Orient	Leyton Orient		36	2	1	0	1	0	9	1	47	3
Barnet	2021–22	National League	13	0	0	0	~	~	2 (Note: Appearances in the Middlesex Senior Cup)	0	15	0
Career total			281	16	12	0	2	0	28	2	323	18

== Honours ==
=== Club ===
Leyton Orient

- National League: 2018–19
- FA Trophy runner-up: 2018–19
