= Lee Angol =

English footballer (born 1994)

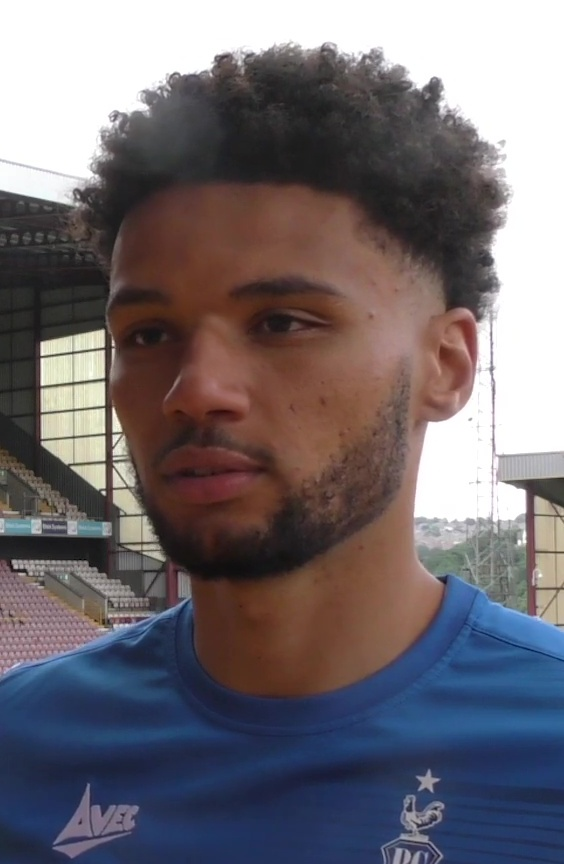
- Angol with Bradford City in 2021

Personal information
- Full name: Lee Anthony Angol
- Date of birth: 4 August 1994 (age 32)
- Place of birth: Carshalton, England
- Height: 6 ft 1 1/2 in (1.87 m)
- Position: Forward

Youth career
- 2011–2012: Tottenham Hotspur

Senior career*
Years	Team	Apps	(Gls)
2012–2014	Wycombe Wanderers	3	(0)
2013	→ Hendon (loan)	9	(2)
2013	→ Hendon (loan)	4	(2)
2013	→ Maidenhead United (loan)	1	(0)
2013–2014	→ Boreham Wood (loan)	19	(5)
2014–2015	Luton Town	0	(0)
2014–2015	→ Boreham Wood (loan)	39	(25)
2015–2017	Peterborough United	46	(12)
2017	→ Lincoln City (loan)	11	(5)
2017–2018	Mansfield Town	29	(9)
2018–2019	Shrewsbury Town	17	(3)
2019	→ Lincoln City (loan)	2	(0)
2019–2021	Leyton Orient	38	(5)
2021–2023	Bradford City	32	(6)
2023–2024	Sutton United	43	(5)
2024	→ Woking (loan)	1	(0)
2024–2025	Morecambe	26	(7)
2025	Cheltenham Town	9	(0)
2026	Eastbourne Borough	8	(0)
- * Club domestic league appearances and goals as of 23:38, 25 April 2026 (UTC)

Lee Anthony Angol (born 4 August 1994) is an English professional footballer who plays as a forward, most recently for Isthmian League Premier Division club Eastbourne Borough.

== Career ==
=== Wycombe Wanderers ===
On 2 July 2012, Angol was signed by Wycombe Wanderers after leaving Tottenham Hotspur, having been a regular in their academy team. He made his professional debut on 11 August as a 100th-minute substitute for Matt Bloomfield against Watford in the League Cup first round, which finished as a 1–0 defeat after extra time. Angol then made his league debut as an 84th-minute substitute for Grant Basey in a 1–0 defeat at home to Gillingham on 21 August. On 28 January 2013, Angol joined Isthmian League Premier Division club Hendon on a five-week loan. He scored on his debut two days later in a 3–1 victory over Croydon in the London Senior Cup, and this was followed up with a goal in the following match, a 2–1 victory over Carshalton Athletic. Angol's loan was extended on 7 March until 2 April. He completed the loan spell with three goals from 10 appearances. Upon his return to Wycombe, Angol signed a new one-year contract with the club in May 2013.

Angol started 2013–14 on loan at Hendon, having rejoined the club on a one-month loan on 17 August 2013. He scored on his second debut later that day in a 5–3 defeat at home to Maidstone United, and completed the loan spell with two goals from four appearances. Angol joined Conference South club Maidenhead United on a one-month youth loan on 5 October. He made his debut and only appearance for the club later that day in a 3–1 defeat at home to Havant & Waterlooville. On 24 January 2014, Angol signed for Maidenhead's Conference South rivals Boreham Wood on an initial one-month loan. He debuted a day later as a 77th-minute substitute in a 2–2 draw at home to Dover Athletic. Angol's loan was extended until the end of the season, which he completed with 22 appearances and seven goals.

=== Luton Town ===
On 9 July 2014, Angol signed a one-year contract with newly promoted League Two club Luton Town on a free transfer, and was immediately sent out on a season-long loan to Boreham Wood. He finished 2014–15 as the Conference South top scorer with 25 goals from 39 appearances, as well as additional goals in Boreham Wood's FA Cup campaign and play-off victory, helping them to promotion to the National League for the first time in their history. He was named as the club's Player of the Season alongside winning the Young Player of the Year accolade at the National Game Awards. Luton offered him a new contract in May 2015 upon his return from the loan, but Angol rejected it.

=== Peterborough United ===
Angol signed a three-year contract with League One club Peterborough United on 20 July 2015. He scored twice on his debut for the club in a 5–1 victory away to Oldham Athletic on 12 September, and finished 2015–16 with 38 appearances and 11 goals.

Angol fractured his ankle in a pre-season friendly against Boston United in July 2016 and required surgery to place a pin in his leg. On 6 March 2017, Angol was loaned to National League club Lincoln City until the end of 2016–17. He scored a hat-trick on his debut a day later in a 4–0 victory away to Braintree Town, and completed the loan spell with 13 appearances and six goals. Upon his return to Peterborough, Angol was transfer-listed by the club.

=== Mansfield Town ===
On 18 May 2017, Angol joined League Two club Mansfield Town for an undisclosed fee.

=== Shrewsbury Town ===
Angol signed for League One club Shrewsbury Town on 9 August 2018 on a two-year contract for an undisclosed fee, with the option of a further year. He rejoined League Two leaders Lincoln on 31 January 2019 on loan until the end of 2018–19, and made only two brief substitute appearances.

=== Leyton Orient ===
On 1 July 2019, Angol joined newly promoted League Two club Leyton Orient for an undisclosed fee, signing a two-year contract. At the end of the 2020–21 season, Angol was released by the club.

=== Bradford City ===
On 22 June 2021, following his departure from Leyton Orient, Angol agreed to join Bradford City on an initial one-year deal.

On 4 May 2022, Angol signed a new one-year contract extension with the option for a further twelve months.

=== Sutton United ===
He signed for Sutton United for an undisclosed fee on 11 January 2023.

On 23 March 2024, Angol returned to the National League, joining Woking on loan for the remainder of the campaign.

Following relegation at the end of the 2023–24 season, Angol was announced to be leaving the club upon the expiration of his contract.

=== Morecambe ===
On 25 July 2024, Angol signed for League Two club Morecambe, signing a one-year contract.

=== Cheltenham Town ===
On 30 June 2025, Angol signed for Cheltenham Town, signing a one-year contract. In December 2025, Angol departed the club having made 11 appearances in all competitions.

=== Eastbourne Borough ===
On 12 March 2026, Angol signed for Eastbourne Borough.

== Career statistics ==
As of match played 29 April 2026

Appearances and goals by club, season and competition
Club	Season	League			FA Cup		League Cup		Other		Total	
Club	Season	Division	Apps	Goals	Apps	Goals	Apps	Goals	Apps	Goals	Apps	Goals
Wycombe Wanderers	2012–13	League Two	3	0	0	0	1	0	0	0	4	0
Wycombe Wanderers	2013–14	League Two	0	0	0	0	0	0	0	0	0	0
Wycombe Wanderers	Total		3	0	0	0	1	0	0	0	4	0
Hendon (loan)	2012–13	Isthmian League Premier Division	9	2	—		—		1 (Note: Appearance(s) in London Senior Cup)	1	10	3
Hendon (loan)	2013–14	Isthmian League Premier Division	4	2	—		—		—		4	2
Hendon (loan)	Total		13	4	—		—		1	1	14	5
Maidenhead United (loan)	2013–14	Conference South	1	0	—		—		—		1	0
Boreham Wood (loan)	2013–14	Conference South	19	5	—		—		3 (Note: Appearance(s) in Herts Senior Cup)	2	22	7
Luton Town	2014–15	League Two	0	0	—		0	0	0	0	0	0
Boreham Wood (loan)	2014–15	Conference South	39	25	4	3	—		6 (Note: One appearance in FA Trophy, two appearances and three goals in Herts Senior Cup, three appearances and two goals in Conference South play-offs)	5	49	33
Peterborough United	2015–16	League One	33	11	5	0	0	0	0	0	38	11
Peterborough United	2016–17	League One	13	1	3	0	0	0	1 (Note: Appearance(s) in EFL Trophy)	0	17	1
Peterborough United	Total		46	12	8	0	0	0	1	0	55	12
Lincoln City (loan)	2016–17	National League	11	5	—		—		2 (Note: Appearance(s) in FA Trophy)	1	13	6
Mansfield Town	2017–18	League Two	29	9	2	0	0	0	3	1	34	10
Mansfield Town	2018–19	League Two	0	0	—		—		—		0	0
Mansfield Town	Total		29	9	2	0	0	0	3	1	34	10
Shrewsbury Town	2018–19	League One	17	3	3	0	1	0	4	1	25	4
Lincoln City (loan)	2018–19	League Two	2	0	—		—		—		2	0
Leyton Orient	2019–20	League Two	26	4	0	0	1	0	2	1	29	5
Leyton Orient	2020–21	League Two	12	1	0	0	2	0	3	1	17	2
Leyton Orient	Total		38	5	0	0	3	0	5	2	46	7
Bradford City	2021–22	League Two	18	6	2	1	1	0	1	0	22	7
Bradford City	2022–23	League Two	14	0	1	0	2	0	3	0	20	0
Bradford City	Total		32	6	3	1	3	0	4	0	42	7
Sutton United	2022–23	League Two	17	3	0	0	0	0	0	0	17	3
Sutton United	2023–24	League Two	26	2	3	1	3	0	2	0	34	3
Sutton United	Total		43	5	3	1	3	0	2	0	51	6
Woking (loan)	2023–24	National League	1	0	—		—		0	0	1	0
Morecambe	2024–25	League Two	26	7	0	0	1	0	1	1	28	8
Cheltenham Town	2025–26	League Two	9	0	0	0	1	0	1	0	11	0
Eastbourne Borough	2025–26	National League South	8	0	—		—		1 (Note: Appearance(s) in Sussex Senior Cup)	0	9	0
Career total			337	86	23	5	13	0	34	14	407	105

== Honours ==
Boreham Wood

- Conference South play-offs: 2014–15

Lincoln City

- National League: 2016–17

Individual

- Conference South Golden Boot: 2014–15
- Boreham Wood Player of the Year: 2014–15
- Boreham Wood Young Player of the Year: 2014–15
