= 2018–19 Bradford City A.F.C. season =

Bradford City A.F.C.
2018–19 season
- Chairman: Edic Rahic; Stefan Rupp
- Head Coach: Michael Collins (Until 3 September); David Hopkin (Between 4 September–25 February); Gary Bowyer (from 4 March)
- Stadium: Valley Parade
- League One: 24th (relegated)
- FA Cup: Round 2 Replay (vs. Peterborough United)
- EFL Cup: Round 1 (vs. Macclesfield Town)
- EFL Trophy: Group Stage
- Top goalscorer: League: Eoin Doyle (11); All: Eoin Doyle (11)
- Highest home attendance: 19,487 vs. Sunderland (League One)
- Lowest home attendance: 902 vs. Everton U21's (EFL Trophy)
- Average home league attendance: 16,130
- Biggest win: 4–0 vs. Walsall (15 December 2018)
- Biggest defeat: 0–4 vs. Gillingham (27 October 2018)
Home colours	Away colours	Third colours

The 2018–19 season is Bradford City's 116th season in their history, their 104th in the English Football League and 106th in the English football league system.

== Pre-season ==
On 18 May 2018, Bradford City announced two friendly games against Farsley Celtic and Sheffield United. Three days later, they revealed further matches with Guiseley and local derby against Bradford Park Avenue. On 23 May 2018, a further date away at York City was added to the preseason schedule followed by an away date against Harrogate Town announced on 11 June. On 22 June 2018, a further away date against Carlisle United was announced.

Date	Opponents	H / A	Result F–A	Scorers	Attendance
7 July 2018	Farsley Celtic	A	A–A	Match cancelled due to safety concerns	
10 July 2018	Guiseley	A	1–2	Powell 46'	
14 July 2018	York City	A	0–1		
17 July 2017	Sheffield United	H	2–3	Payne 53', Brünker 80'	
18 July 2018	Bradford Park Avenue	A	2–1	Colville 71', Clare 90+1'	
21 July 2018	Harrogate Town	A	2–7	Clare (2) 59', 66'	1,082
28 July 2018	Carlisle United	A	0–1		

== Competitions ==
=== League One ===
==== League table ====
Pos	Team	Pld	W	D	L	GF	GA	GD	Pts	Promotion, qualification or relegation
20	AFC Wimbledon	46	13	11	22	42	63	−21	50	
21	Plymouth Argyle (R)	46	13	11	22	56	80	−24	50	Relegation to EFL League Two
22	Walsall (R)	46	12	11	23	49	71	−22	47	Relegation to EFL League Two
23	Scunthorpe United (R)	46	12	10	24	53	83	−30	46	Relegation to EFL League Two
24	Bradford City (R)	46	11	8	27	49	77	−28	41	Relegation to EFL League Two

Source: EFL Official Website
Rules for classification: 1) Points; 2) Goal difference; 3) Number of goals scored; 4) Head-to-head results
(R) Relegated

==== Result summary ====
Overall								Home						Away					
Pld	W	D	L	GF	GA	GD	Pts	W	D	L	GF	GA	GD	W	D	L	GF	GA	GD
46	11	8	27	49	77	−28	41	7	4	12	25	31	−6	4	4	15	24	46	−22

Last updated: 27 April 2019.
Source: Statto.com

==== Matches ====
On 21 June 2018, the League One fixtures for the forthcoming season were announced.

Date	Opponents	H / A	Result F–A	Scorers	Attendance	Position
4 August 2018	Shrewsbury Town	A	1–0	Payne 19'	7,625	10th
11 August 2018	Barnsley	H	0–2		18,986	13th
18 August 2018	Southend United	A	0–2		6,295	18th
21 August 2018	Burton Albion	H	1–0	Payne 32'	15,302	9th
25 August 2018	Wycombe Wanderers	H	1–2	Colville 90+1'	15,563	13th
1 September 2018	Fleetwood Town	A	1–2	Doyle 23' (pen.)	3,347	17th
8 September 2018	Blackpool	A	2–3	Doyle 59' (pen.), Payne 64'	4,393	19th
15 September 2018	Charlton Athletic	H	0–2		15,709	21st
22 September 2018	Doncaster Rovers	A	1–2	Miller 81'	8,481	22nd
29 September 2018	Bristol Rovers	H	0–0		15,916	22nd
2 October 2018	AFC Wimbledon	A	1–0	Payne 45+1' (pen.)	3,630	19th
6 October 2018	Sunderland	H	1–2	A. O'Connor 52'	19,487	22nd
13 October 2018	Accrington Stanley	A	1–3	Doyle 62'	3,346	22nd
20 October 2018	Rochdale	H	0–2		15,875	23rd
23 October 2018	Coventry City	H	2–4	A. O'Connor (2) 62', 78'	11,075	24th
27 October 2018	Gillingham	A	0–4		4,399	24th
3 November 2018	Portsmouth	H	0–1		16,393	24th
17 November 2018	Peterborough United	A	1–1	A. O'Connor 10'	8,046	24th
24 November 2018	Oxford United	H	2–0	Ball 25', Payne 28'	19,084	24th
27 November 2018	Luton Town	A	0–4		8,568	24th
8 December 2018	Plymouth Argyle	A	3–3	Payne (2) 4', 18', Miller 53'	9,092	24th
15 December 2018	Walsall	H	4–0	Caddis 34', Ball (2) 52', 61', Doyle 83'	15,314	22nd
22 December 2018	Scunthorpe United	H	2–0	Payne 10', Doyle 27' (pen.)	16,130	20th
26 December 2018	Sunderland	A	0–1		46,039	21st
29 December 2018	Rochdale	A	4–0	Knight-Percival 23', A. O'Connor 48', Doyle 60' (pen.), Miller 89'	5,673	21st
1 January 2019	Accrington Stanley	H	3–0	L. O'Brien 21', Doyle 30', Wood 49'	16,318	20th
12 January 2019	Barnsley	A	0–3		14,962	22nd
19 January 2019	Southend United	H	0–4		15,517	23rd
26 January 2019	Burton Albion	A	1–1	Akpan 68'	3,162	23rd
29 January 2019	Shrewsbury Town	H	4–3	Grant 19' (o.g.), L. O'Brien 38', Doyle 60', Ball 90+6'	14,906	21st
2 February 2019	Wycombe Wanderers	A	0–0		4,586	22nd
9 February 2019	Fleetwood Town	H	0–1		15,365	23rd
16 February 2019	Plymouth Argyle	H	0–0		15,855	23rd
23 February 2019	Walsall	A	2–3	Doyle 12', A. O'Connor 54'	5,503	23rd
2 March 2019	Portsmouth	A	1–5	Akpan 65'	17,657	23rd
9 March 2019	Peterborough United	H	3–1	Butterfield 70', Doyle 83', L. O'Brien 86'	15,890	23rd
12 March 2019	Luton Town	H	0–1		15,992	23rd
16 March 2019	Oxford United	A	0–1		6,681	24th
23 March 2019	Blackpool	H	1–4	Ball 90+2'	16,307	24th
30 March 2019	Charlton Athletic	A	0–1		11,630	24th
6 April 2019	Doncaster Rovers	H	0–1		16,496	24th
13 April 2019	Bristol Rovers	A	2–3	L. O'Brien 16', Knight-Percival 90'	8,418	24th
19 April 2019	Coventry City	A	0–2		11,711	24th
22 April 2019	Gillingham	H	1–1	Mellor 10'	15,686	24th
27 April 2019	Scunthorpe United	A	3–2	Clarke 2', Anderson 12', Doyle 15'	4,528	24th
4 May 2019	AFC Wimbledon	H	0–0		17,817	24th

=== FA Cup ===
The first round draw was made live on BBC by Dennis Wise and Dion Dublin on 22 October. The draw for the second round was made live on BBC and BT by Mark Schwarzer and Glenn Murray on 12 November.

Date	Round	Opponents	H / A	Result F–A	Scorers	Attendance
10 November 2018	Round 1	Aldershot Town	A	1–1	Knight-Percival 71'	2,455
20 November 2018	Round 1 Replay	Aldershot Town	H	1–1 (4–1 p)	Fowler 101' (o.g.)	2,248
1 December 2018	Round 2	Peterborough United	A	2–2	Mellor 84', Colville 89'	3,750
11 December 2018	Round 2 Replay	Peterborough United	H	4–4 (2–3 p)	Miller (2) 22', 72', Ball 53', Caddis 58'	3,486

=== EFL Cup ===
On 15 June 2018, the draw for the first round was made in Vietnam.

Date	Round	Opponents	H / A	Result F–A	Scorers	Attendance
14 August 2018	Round 1	Macclesfield Town	A	1–1 (2–4p)	Colville 62'	1,422

=== EFL Trophy ===
On 13 July 2018, the initial group stage draw bar the U21 invited clubs was announced.

Pos	Lge	Team	Pld	W	PW	PL	L	GF	GA	GD	Pts	Qualification
1	L1	Barnsley	3	2	1	0	0	5	3	+2	8	Round 2
2	L2	Oldham Athletic	3	2	0	0	1	8	5	+3	6	Round 2
3	ACA	Everton U21	3	0	0	2	1	4	5	−1	2	
4	L1	Bradford City	3	0	1	0	2	3	7	−4	2	

Source: EFL.com

Date	Round	Opponents	H / A	Result F–A	Scorers	Attendance
25 September 2018	Group Stage	Everton U21's	H	1–1 (6–5 p)	Miller 90+2'	902
9 October 2018	Group Stage	Oldham Athletic	H	1–4	Brünker 49'	1,015
13 November 2018	Group Stage	Barnsley	A	1–2	Ball 8'	2,925

== Squad statistics ==
No.	Pos.	Name	League		FA Cup		EFL Cup		EFL Trophy		Total		Discipline	
No.	Pos.	Name	Apps	Goals	Apps	Goals	Apps	Goals	Apps	Goals	Apps	Goals	Yellow card	Red card
1	GK	(England) Richard O'Donnell	42	0	3	0	0	0	3	0	48	0	3	0
2	DF	(England) Joe Riley	5(1)	0	0	0	1	0	0(1)	0	6(2)	0	0	0
3	DF	(England) Adam Chicksen	26(2)	0	3	0	1	0	1	0	31(2)	0	6	2
5	DF	(Republic of Ireland) Paudie O'Connor	8(1)	0	0	0	0	0	0	0	8(1)	0	0	0
6	DF	(Republic of Ireland) Anthony O'Connor	41(1)	6	4	0	1	0	2	0	48(1)	6	8	0
7	MF	(Republic of Ireland) Sean Scannell	15(1)	0	0	0	1	0	1	0	17(1)	0	0	1
8	MF	(England) Jake Reeves	0	0	0	0	0	0	0	0	0	0	0	0
9	FW	(Republic of Ireland) Eoin Doyle	40(4)	11	3(1)	0	0	0	0	0	43(5)	11	5	0
10	FW	(England) Jack Payne	33(6)	8	4	0	1	0	2(1)	0	40(7)	8	3	0
11	DF	(England) Tyrell Robinson	0(2)	0	0	0	0	0	0	0	0(2)	0	0	0
12	FW	(England) George Miller	18(21)	3	2(2)	2	1	0	1	1	22(23)	6	5	1
13	GK	(England) Ben Wilson	4	0	1	0	1	0	0	0	6	0	0	0
15	DF	(England) Kelvin Mellor	17(3)	1	2	1	0	0	0	0	19(3)	2	1	0
16	MF	(England) Jacob Butterfield	11(4)	1	0	0	0	0	0	0	11(4)	1	1	0
17	FW	(Republic of Ireland) Billy Clarke	6(8)	1	0	0	0	0	0	0	6(8)	1	1	0
18	MF	(England) Jermaine Anderson	9(4)	1	0	0	0	0	0	0	9(4)	1	1	0
20	FW	(England) Omari Patrick	0(1)	0	0	0	0	0	0	0	0(1)	0	0	0
21	MF	(Nigeria) Hope Akpan	24(4)	2	2	0	1	0	0	0	27(4)	2	4	0
22	DF	(England) Nathaniel Knight-Percival	34(1)	2	3	1	0	0	3	0	40(1)	3	12	2
23	DF	(England) Connor Wood	18(4)	1	1(1)	0	0	0	1(1)	0	20(6)	1	4	0
24	MF	(England) Daniel Devine	2(1)	0	1(1)	0	0	0	1	0	4(2)	0	0	0
25	DF	(England) Calum Woods	5(1)	0	0	0	0	0	0	0	5(1)	0	0	0
27	FW	(England) Jordan Gibson	1(10)	0	0	0	0	0	2	0	3(10)	0	1	0
28	MF	(England) Cameron Hawkes	0	0	0	0	0	0	0	0	0	0	0	0
32	DF	(England) Josef Hefele	0	0	0	0	0	0	0	0	0	0	0	0
33	FW	(England) Tom Clare	0	0	0	0	0	0	0	0	0	0	0	0
35	DF	(England) Reece Staunton	0	0	0	0	0	0	1	0	1	0	0	0
36	MF	(England) Luca Colville	3(8)	1	0(2)	1	1	1	0	0	4(10)	3	1	0
37	MF	(England) Eliot Goldthorp	0(2)	0	0	0	0	0	1(1)	0	1(3)	0	2	0
38	DF	(Scotland) Paul Caddis	25(2)	1	2	1	0	0	0	0	27(2)	2	8	0
39	MF	(England) Lewis O'Brien	38(2)	4	4	0	0	0	1(1)	0	43(3)	4	9	0
40	FW	(England) David Ball	30(5)	5	4	1	0	0	3	1	37(5)	7	9	0
44	MF	(England) Josh Wright	15(3)	0	0(1)	0	0(1)	0	2	0	17(5)	0	4	0
47	MF	(England) Raecce Ellington	0	0	0	0	0	0	0(1)	0	0(1)	0	0	0
-	–	Own goals	–	1	–	1	–	0	–	0	–	2	–	–
Players out on loan for rest of the season
4	DF	(Australia) Ryan McGowan	22(1)	0	2	0	1	0	0	0	25(1)	0	10	0
14	FW	(Northern Ireland) Shay McCartan	0	0	0	0	0	0	0	0	0	0	0	0
16	DF	(England) Jacob Hanson	0	0	0	0	0	0	0	0	0	0	0	0
19	FW	(England) Alex Jones	0(2)	0	0	0	0	0	0(1)	0	0(3)	0	0	0
29	MF	(Scotland) Callum Gunner	0	0	0	0	0	0	0	0	0	0	0	0
31	GK	(England) George Sykes-Kenworthy	0	0	0	0	0	0	0	0	0	0	0	0
Players left during the season
5	DF	(England) Matthew Kilgallon	0	0	0	0	0	0	0	0	0	0	0	0
5	MF	(Scotland) Jim O'Brien	5(6)	0	2(1)	0	0	0	2	0	9(7)	0	2	0
17	MF	(Netherlands) Sherwin Seedorf	1(5)	0	0	0	1	0	2(1)	0	4(6)	0	0	0
18	FW	(Germany) Kai Bruenker	4(13)	0	0(2)	0	0(1)	0	2	1	6(16)	1	4	0
25	DF	(Sweden) Thomas Isherwood	1(2)	0	0	0	0	0	2	0	3(2)	0	1	0
26	MF	(England) Ellis Hudson	0	0	0	0	0	0	0	0	0	0	0	0
30	MF	(England) Curtis Peters	0	0	0	0	0	0	0	0	0	0	0	0
34	FW	(England) Reece Powell	0	0	0	0	0	0	0	0	0	0	0	0
48	MF	(England) Karl Henry	3(1)	0	1(1)	0	0	0	0	0	4(2)	0	2	0

Statistics accurate as of 4 May 2019

== Transfers ==
=== Transfers in ===
Date from	Position	Nationality	Name	From	Fee	Ref.
1 July 2018	CF	(England)	Tom Clare	Barnsley	Free transfer	
1 July 2018	CB	(Sweden)	Thomas Isherwood	(Germany) Bayern Munich II	Free transfer	
1 July 2018	CB	(Republic of Ireland)	Anthony O'Connor	(Scotland) Aberdeen	Free transfer	
1 July 2018	GK	(England)	Richard O'Donnell	Northampton Town	Free transfer	
1 July 2018	RB	(England)	Joe Riley	Manchester United	Undisclosed	
1 July 2018	LB	(England)	Connor Wood	Leicester City	Undisclosed	
1 July 2018	CM	(England)	Josh Wright	Southend United	Free transfer	
4 July 2018	CM	(Nigeria)	Hope Akpan	Burton Albion	Free transfer	
19 July 2018	RW	(Republic of Ireland)	Sean Scannell	Huddersfield Town	Undisclosed	
28 July 2018	GK	(England)	Ben Wilson	(Wales) Cardiff City	Free transfer	
31 July 2018	RB	(England)	Kelvin Mellor	Blackpool	Free transfer	
1 August 2018	CF	(Republic of Ireland)	Eoin Doyle	Preston North End	Undisclosed	
14 August 2018	RM	(England)	Luca Colville	Huddersfield Town	Free transfer	
13 September 2018	CM	(Scotland)	Jim O'Brien	(Scotland) Ross County	Free transfer	
16 November 2018	RB	(Scotland)	Paul Caddis	Blackburn Rovers	Free transfer	
23 November 2018	DM	(England)	Karl Henry	Bolton Wanderers	Free transfer	
17 January 2019	CM	(England)	Jermaine Anderson	Peterborough United	Undisclosed	
23 January 2019	RB	(England)	Calum Woods	Preston North End	Free transfer	
31 January 2019	AM	(Republic of Ireland)	Billy Clarke	Charlton Athletic	Free transfer	

=== Transfers out ===
Date from	Position	Nationality	Name	To	Fee	Ref.
1 July 2018	DM	(France)	Timothée Dieng	Southend United	Free transfer	
1 July 2018	GK	(Republic of Ireland)	Colin Doyle	(Scotland) Heart of Midlothian	Mutual consent	
1 July 2018	CF	(Germany)	Joel Grodowski	(Germany) Hammer SpVg	Released	
1 July 2018	CB	(England)	Alex Laird	Free agent	Released	
1 July 2018	CM	(England)	Nicky Law	Exeter City	Released	
1 July 2018	RB	(England)	Tony McMahon	Oxford United	Released	
1 July 2018	GK	(Germany)	Lukas Raeder	(Germany) Rot-Weiss Essen	Released	
1 July 2018	GK	(Germany)	Rouven Sattelmaier	(Germany) SV Darmstadt 98	Released	
1 July 2018	LM	(England)	Reece Webb-Foster	Lancaster City	Released	
5 July 2018	CF	(England)	Dominic Poleon	Crawley Town	Undisclosed	
19 July 2018	DM	(France)	Romain Vincelot	Crawley Town	Undisclosed	
1 August 2018	CF	(England)	Charlie Wyke	Sunderland	Undisclosed	
2 August 2018	CF	(England)	Paul Taylor	Doncaster Rovers	Free transfer	
31 August 2018	CB	(England)	Matthew Kilgallon	(Scotland) Hamilton Academical	Mutual consent	
18 December 2018	RM	(England)	Ellis Hudson	Free agent	Mutual consent	
24 December 2018	DM	(England)	Karl Henry	Free agent	Mutual consent	
4 January 2019	RB	(England)	Jacob Hanson	FC Halifax Town	Undisclosed	
7 January 2019	CF	(Germany)	Kai Brünker	(Germany) SG Sonnenhof Großaspach	Mutual consent	
8 January 2019	CM	(Scotland)	Jim O'Brien	Notts County	Released	
23 January 2019	CB	(Sweden)	Thomas Isherwood	Free agent	Mutual consent	

=== Loans in ===
Start date	Position	Nationality	Name	From	End date	Ref.
16 July 2018	CF	(England)	George Miller	Middlesbrough	31 January 2019	
16 July 2018	AM	(England)	Jack Payne	Huddlesfield Town	31 May 2019	
31 August 2018	MF	(England)	Lewis O'Brien	Huddersfield Town	31 May 2019	
3 September 2018	CF	(England)	David Ball	Rotherham United	31 May 2019	
8 January 2019	CB	(Republic of Ireland)	Paudie O'Connor	Leeds United	31 May 2019	
31 January 2019	CM	(England)	Jacob Butterfield	Derby County	31 May 2019	
31 January 2019	CF	(England)	George Miller	Barnsley	31 May 2019	

=== Loans out ===
Start date	Position	Nationality	Name	To	End date	Ref.
4 July 2018	DF	(England)	Jacob Hanson	FC Halifax Town	1 January 2019	
24 July 2018	SS	(Northern Ireland)	Shay McCartan	Lincoln City	31 May 2019	
28 August 2018	CF	(England)	Omari Patrick	Yeovil Town	2 January 2019	
25 January 2019	CF	(England)	Alex Jones	Cambridge United	31 May 2019	
31 January 2019	LW	(England)	Jordan Gibson	Stevenage	31 May 2019	
31 January 2019	CB	(Australia)	Ryan McGowan	(Scotland) Dundee	31 May 2019	
13 March 2019	FW	(England)	Tom Clare	Boston United	31 May 2019	
