= Shay McCartan =

Association and Gaelic football player from Northern Ireland

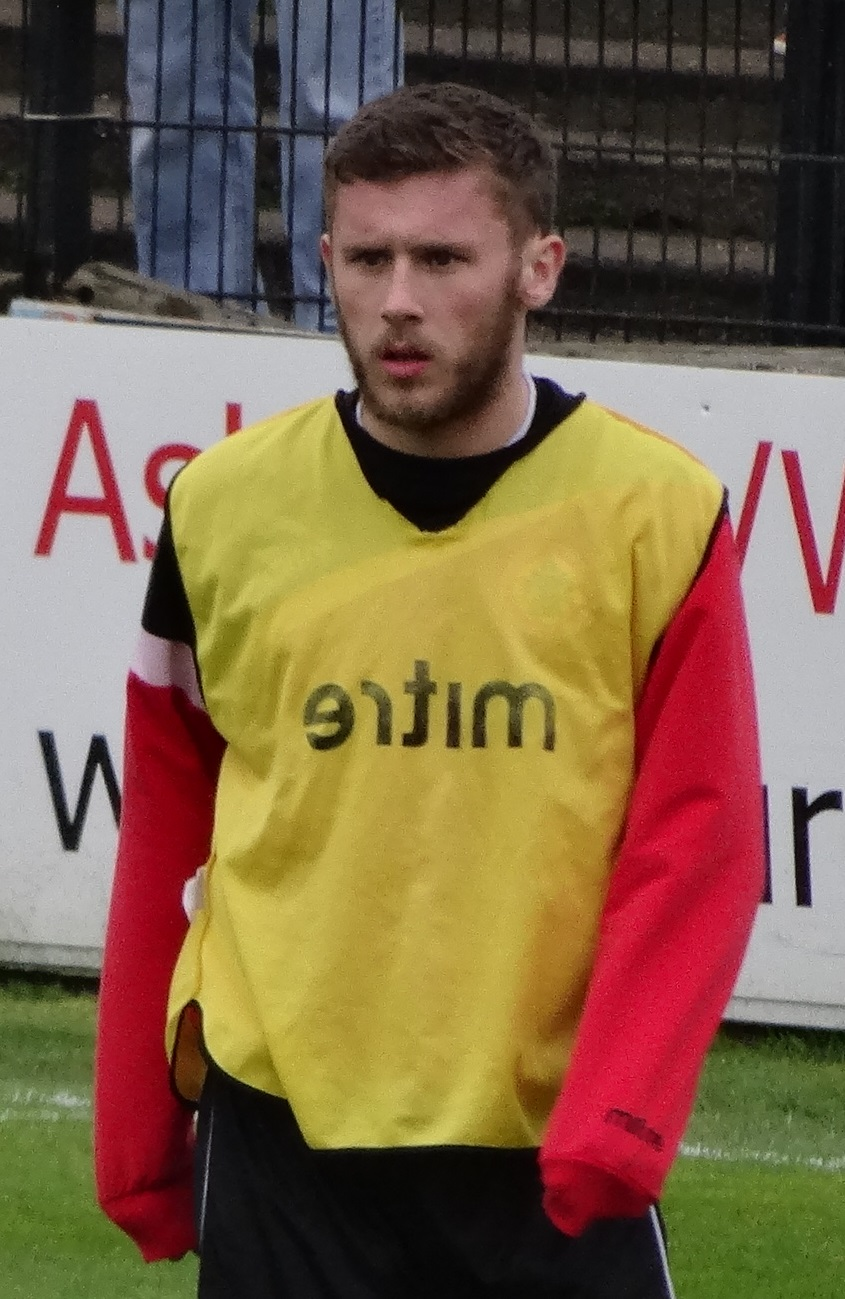
- McCartan training with Accrington Stanley in 2014

Personal information
- Full name: Seamus Vincent McCartan
- Date of birth: 18 May 1994 (age 32)
- Place of birth: Newry, Northern Ireland
- Height: 1.78 m (5 ft 10 in)
- Position: Forward

Team information
- Current team: Portadown
- Number: 24

Youth career
- 2009–2010: Glenavon
- 2010–2012: Burnley

Senior career*
| Years | Team | Apps | (Gls) |
| 2012–2013 | Burnley | 1 | (0) |
| 2013 | → Hyde (loan) | 16 | (1) |
| 2013–2017 | Accrington Stanley | 110 | (24) |
| 2017–2020 | Bradford City | 45 | (8) |
| 2018–2019 | → Lincoln City (loan) | 38 | (7) |
| 2020–2021 | Ballymena United | 36 | (18) |
| 2021–2024 | Glentoran | 89 | (14) |
| 2024– | Portadown | 52 | (4) |

International career^{‡}
| 2010–2011 | Northern Ireland U17 | 5 | (3) |
| 2011–2012 | Northern Ireland U19 | 3 | (2) |
| 2013–2016 | Northern Ireland U21 | 9 | (2) |
| 2017–2018 | Northern Ireland | 2 | (0) |
- * Club domestic league appearances and goals as of 29 April 2026 ‡ National team caps and goals as of 22:00, 5 June 2018 (UTC)

Seamus Vincent McCartan (born 18 May 1994) is a Northern Irish footballer who plays as a forward for NIFL Premiership side Portadown.

McCartan joined Burnley in May 2010 on a two-year scholarship, having previously played for Banbridge Town and Glenavon. He made his debut for the club in the Championship in April 2012 and spent the 2012–13 season on loan at Hyde. He joined Accrington Stanley on a free transfer in July 2013 and went on to play 126 matches over the next four seasons, scoring 24 goals. He was named as League Two Player of the Month in March 2017 and three months later was signed by Bradford City for an undisclosed six-figure fee. He spent the 2018–19 season on loan at Lincoln City, who would win promotion as champions of League Two. He spent the 2019–20 season back at Bradford, before being released in May 2020. It was announced in September 2020 that he had signed with Ballymena United in the Irish Premiership.

Having scored goals for his country at under-17, under-19 and under-21 level, he won his first cap for the senior team in June 2017. He also played Gaelic football, winning the MacRory Cup with St Colman's College, Newry, in March 2010, and featuring for Down minors in May 2011.

== Club career ==
=== Youth career ===
Born in Newry, McCartan started his youth career with his local side Banbridge Town, where he played for several years. In 2009, he joined Glenavon, where he spent one season. He also represented County Down in the 2009 Milk Cup and was named as the side's player of the tournament. In May 2010, McCartan signed for Burnley on a two-year apprenticeship, beating off competition from other clubs. Burnley paid a compensation fee to both Glenavon and Banbridge. He was part of the squad that got to the FA Youth Cup semi-finals for the first time since 1978, scoring a last minute goal against West Bromwich Albion in the process.

=== Burnley ===
McCartan was first involved with the first-team squad in September 2011, when he was an unused substitute in the 2–1 League Cup victory over Milton Keynes Dons. His first Championship involvement came when he was an unused substitute against Brighton & Hove Albion on 6 April 2012. McCartan made his professional debut three days later in a 2–1 win over Doncaster Rovers, coming on as a substitute for Josh McQuoid in the final minute. Manager Eddie Howe had played a number of youth team graduates towards the end of the 2011–12 season in an attempt to fill out the "Clarets" squad. McCartan was given a professional contract after he scored 23 times for the youth team in 2012.

On 31 January 2013, he joined Conference Premier side Hyde on an initial one-month loan, which was later extended until the end of the 2012–13 campaign. He scored his first senior career goal for the "Tigers" in a 2–0 win over Wrexham at Ewen Fields on 30 March. This was his only goal in 16 appearances as Scott McNiven's Hyde avoided relegation with an 18th-place finish despite being the only semi-professional side in the division.

=== Accrington ===
On 2 July 2013, McCartan signed a one-year contract with League Two club Accrington Stanley; Stanley boss James Beattie said he knew a lot of people at Turf Moor were surprised when Sean Dyche released him, whilst McCartan said that hoped that as a former striker Beattie could improve his skills. He scored his first goal in the Football League on 12 April 2014, providing a stoppage time equaliser by heading in a Lee Molyneux corner in a 1–1 draw at York City; speaking four years later he recalled that "we were in a relegation fight at the time and that was a special moment". This was to prove his only goal from 21 matches in the 2013–14 season. He scored a brace on his first start of the 2014–15 season, in a 3–1 win over Hartlepool United at the Crown Ground. He contributed six goals in 36 games throughout the campaign and signed a new 12-month contract in July.

On 13 February 2016, he was sent off for the first in his career in a 4–1 home win over Crawley Town; Crawley's Simon Walton and Stanley's Jason Mooney were also sent off as a melee ensued. Accrington qualified for the play-offs at the end of the 2015–16 season, missing out on automatic promotion after finishing behind third-placed Bristol Rovers on goal difference. They were eliminated from the play-off semi-finals with a 3–2 aggregate defeat to AFC Wimbledon; McCartan was substituted at the end of normal time in the second leg, which Accrington had been winning 2–1 on the night before conceding an equalising goal in extra-time. He signed a new two-year deal in July as the departure of Josh Windass opened up a place in the starting eleven. Manager John Coleman stated that "I am confident he will grab the opportunity with both hands".

He was named as League Two Player of the Month for March 2017 after scoring six goals in seven games, including free-kicks against Barnet, Exeter City, Morecambe and Grimsby Town; Sky Sports pundit Don Goodman said that "His technique from free-kicks rivals the very best on offer anywhere at the moment, and opposition goalkeepers and defenders must fear the worst when they see him lining up". He reached double figures for the first time, ending the 2016–17 campaign with ten goals in 39 appearances.

"I am looking forward to a new challenge and it will be exciting to play in League One. I am sorry to leave Accrington, I have had a great four years here. I have loved my time here and they gave me a chance when I was released from Burnley when no one else wanted me. I was signed by James Beattie and Paul Stephenson and then have continued my development under the current gaffer (John Coleman)."

— McCartan enjoyed his time at Accrington.

=== Bradford City ===
McCartan signed a three-year deal with Bradford City on 29 June 2017 for an undisclosed six-figure fee (later reported to be £200,000). He faced competition from Charlie Wyke and Alex Jones, as well as new signings Dominic Poleon and Paul Taylor. He struggled to settle in at Valley Parade and Head of Recruitment Greg Abbott revealed that nine clubs had expressed an interest in McCartan in the January transfer window. He ended the 2017–18 season with four goals in 28 games, and Lincolnshire Live journalist Mark Whiley reported that: "McCartan showed glimpses of quality but found himself in and out of the team as the Bantams went through two permanent managers, Stuart McCall and Simon Grayson, and one caretaker boss, Greg Abbott".

He moved on loan to Lincoln City in July 2018. He was a first-team regular at first, though was limited to just five league starts following the arrival on loanee Danny Rowe in the January transfer window. This was despite him winning the League Two Goal of the Month award for January for an "exquisitely struck volley" with "ferocity and outright power" in a 2–2 at Swindon Town. McCartan scored a total of seven goals in 43 games in the 2018–19 season, including the goal that secured promotion in a 1–1 draw with Cheltenham Town at Sincil Bank on 13 April. "Imps" manager Danny Cowley said that "He's felt like our player and we look forward to hopefully trying to get something agreed in the summer". As Lincoln went up as champions, Bradford replaced them in League Two after getting relegated in McCartan's absence.

After his loan deal ended and he returned to Bradford City, new manager Gary Bowyer confirmed that he was in his first-team plans for the 2019–20 season. McCartan was initially reluctant to return to the club but soon found that the "poisonous changing room" atmosphere had been transformed by Bowyer into "a positive place to be at". He went on to score four goals in 22 games in a shortened season due to the COVID-19 pandemic in England and his departure from the club was confirmed in May 2020.

=== Ballymena United ===
Ballymena United announced on 29 September 2020 that they had signed McCartan.

=== Glentoran ===
On 1 August 2021, it was announced McCartan had signed for Glentoran for an Irish League record fee of £100,000.

On 7 May 2024, it was announced that McCartan would be one of ten players departing Glentoran upon the expiry of their contracts.

== International career ==
McCartan made his debut for the Northern Ireland U17 side in October 2010, in the 2011 UEFA European Under-17 Championship qualifying round, a 0–0 draw with Montenegro. He scored his first goal for Northern Ireland in a 6–0 qualifying win over Azerbaijan. Northern Ireland qualified for the elite round of qualifying after finishing second in the group. Their first group game was a 3–2 defeat to England, with McCartan bagging a brace. His form for the under-17s saw him get called up to the under-19 squad. He made his debut in October 2011, scoring in the 3–1 win over Belarus, in qualification for the 2012 UEFA European Under-19 Championship. On 26 April 2012, still aged just 17, McCartan was called up to the Northern Ireland U21 squad for the first time for their European Under 21 qualifying game against Macedonia. However, he remained an unused substitute. On 12 July 2012, McCartan was called up for the under-19's as part of the Milk Cup squad, along with fellow Burnley player Luke Conlan. On 21 July 2012, McCartan scored in a 5–3 defeat to Chile. He scored his first goal for the under-21s in their 2–1 defeat to Ukraine on 17 November 2015; the game was part of Northern Ireland's 2017 UEFA European Under-21 Championship qualification campaign. He scored again on 29 March 2016, in a 3–1 qualifying defeat to Scotland.

McCartan made his senior debut for Northern Ireland in a friendly 1–0 win over New Zealand at Windsor Park on 2 June 2017. He was retained in the matchday squad for the 2018 FIFA World Cup qualification matches against San Marino and Czech Republic the following month, as Will Grigg was lacking match fitness. Manager Michael O'Neill handed him a second cap on 3 June 2018, in a 3–0 friendly defeat to Costa Rica at San José's Estadio Nacional.

== Style of play ==
An attacker, McCartan can play as a striker or as a forward, able to drop back into midfield when needed. He is a free-kick taker and has scored from four direct kicks in the space of one month.

== Gaelic football ==
Also a Gaelic footballer, he won a MacRory Cup winners medal with St Colman's College, Newry, in March 2010, coming on as a substitute in the final at Casement Park. All-Ireland success in the Hogan Cup followed in April 2010, with McCartan scoring his school's only goal. In May 2011, McCartan appeared for Down minors in the Ulster Football Championship. He scored a hat-trick, but ended up on the losing team.

== Career statistics ==
=== Club ===
As of match played 19 December 2020

Appearances and goals by club, season and competition
| Club | Season | League | | | National Cup (Note: Includes FA Cup) | | League Cup (Note: Includes EFL Cup) | | Other | | Total | |
| Club | Season | Division | Apps | Goals | Apps | Goals | Apps | Goals | Apps | Goals | Apps | Goals |
|---|---|---|---|---|---|---|---|---|---|---|---|---|
| Burnley | 2011–12 | Championship | 1 | 0 | 0 | 0 | 0 | 0 | — | | 1 | 0 |
| Burnley | 2012–13 | Championship | 0 | 0 | 0 | 0 | 0 | 0 | — | | 0 | 0 |
| Burnley | Total | | 1 | 0 | 0 | 0 | 0 | 0 | — | | 1 | 0 |
| Hyde (loan) | 2012–13 | Conference Premier | 16 | 1 | — | | — | | — | | 16 | 1 |
| Accrington Stanley | 2013–14 | League Two | 18 | 1 | 0 | 0 | 2 | 0 | 1 (Note: Appearance(s) in EFL Trophy) | 0 | 21 | 1 |
| Accrington Stanley | 2014–15 | League Two | 31 | 6 | 4 | 0 | 0 | 0 | 1 | 0 | 36 | 6 |
| Accrington Stanley | 2015–16 | League Two | 27 | 7 | 1 | 0 | 0 | 0 | 2 (Note: Appearances in play-offs) | 0 | 30 | 7 |
| Accrington Stanley | 2016–17 | League Two | 34 | 10 | 2 | 0 | 2 | 0 | 1 | 0 | 39 | 10 |
| Accrington Stanley | Total | | 110 | 24 | 7 | 0 | 4 | 0 | 5 | 0 | 126 | 24 |
| Bradford City | 2017–18 | League One | 24 | 4 | 1 | 0 | 0 | 0 | 3 | 0 | 28 | 4 |
| Bradford City | 2018–19 | League One | 0 | 0 | — | | — | | — | | 0 | 0 |
| Bradford City | 2019–20 | League Two | 21 | 4 | 0 | 0 | 0 | 0 | 1 | 0 | 22 | 4 |
| Bradford City | Total | | 45 | 8 | 1 | 0 | 0 | 0 | 4 | 0 | 50 | 8 |
| Lincoln City (loan) | 2018–19 | League Two | 38 | 7 | 3 | 0 | 1 | 0 | 1 | 0 | 43 | 7 |
| Ballymena United | 2020–21 | NIFL Premiership | 11 | 4 | — | | — | | — | | 11 | 4 |
| Career total | | | 221 | 44 | 11 | 0 | 5 | 0 | 10 | 0 | 247 | 44 |

=== International ===
As of match played 3 June 2018

Appearances and goals by national team and year
| National team | Year | Apps | Goals |
|---|---|---|---|
| Northern Ireland | 2017 | 1 | 0 |
| Northern Ireland | 2018 | 1 | 0 |
| Total | | 2 | 0 |

== Honours ==
Individual

- EFL League Two Player of the Month: March 2017

Lincoln City

- EFL League Two: 2018–19
