= Jacob Hanson =

English footballer

Personal information
- Full name: Jacob Luke Hanson
- Date of birth: 30 November 1997 (age 28)
- Place of birth: Kirkburton, England
- Height: 1.83 m (6 ft 0 in)
- Position: Right back

Team information
- Current team: Macclesfield (dual registration)

Youth career
- Kirkburton Juniors
- Huddersfield Town

Senior career*
Years	Team	Apps	(Gls)
2017–2019	Bradford City	3	(0)
2018	→ FC Halifax Town (loan)	2	(0)
2018–2019	→ FC Halifax Town (loan)	24	(1)
2019–2020	FC Halifax Town	6	(0)
2020–2021	Curzon Ashton		
2021	FC United of Manchester		
2021–	Macclesfield		
- * Club domestic league appearances and goals as of 13:07, 20 April 2019 (UTC)

Jacob Luke Hanson (born 30 November 1997) is an English professional footballer who plays for Macclesfield as a right back.

== Career ==
Hanson signed for Huddersfield Town at the age of 13, from Kirkburton Juniors, turning professional two years later. He signed for Bradford City on transfer deadline day, 31 January 2017, alongside Charlie Wyke, Kevin Toner and Matthew Penney. He scored his first professional goal for Bradford on his debut in an EFL Trophy tie against Chesterfield on 29 August 2017. In January 2018, Hanson stated that he was inspired by Tyrell Robinson's breakthrough into the first-team. He moved on loan to FC Halifax Town in March 2018. He re-joined Halifax on loan in July 2018. Hanson joined Halifax on a permanent two-and-a-half-year deal on 4 January 2019 for an undisclosed fee. He left Halifax in November 2020 after the cancellation of his contract, joining Curzon Ashton. In August 2021 he moved to FC United of Manchester before later joining Macclesfield on dual registration terms.

== Playing style ==
Hanson began his career as a striker before becoming a right winger when he signed for Huddersfield, and then a right back, on account of his pace.

== Career statistics ==
As of 20 April 2019

Appearances and goals by club, season and competition
Club	Season	League			FA Cup		League Cup		Other		Total	
Club	Season	Division	Apps	Goals	Apps	Goals	Apps	Goals	Apps	Goals	Apps	Goals
Bradford City	2017–18	League One	3	0	1	0	0	0	3 (Note: Appearances in the EFL Trophy)	1	7	1
Bradford City	2018–19	League One	0	0	0	0	0	0	0	0	0	0
Bradford City	Total		3	0	1	0	0	0	3	1	7	1
FC Halifax Town (loan)	2017–18	National League	2	0	0	0	0	0	0	0	2	0
FC Halifax Town (loan)	2018–19	National League	24	1	4	0	0	0	1	0	29	1
FC Halifax Town	2018–19	National League	6	0	0	0	0	0	1	0	7	0
Career total			35	1	5	0	0	0	5	1	45	2
