= Kai Brünker =

German footballer

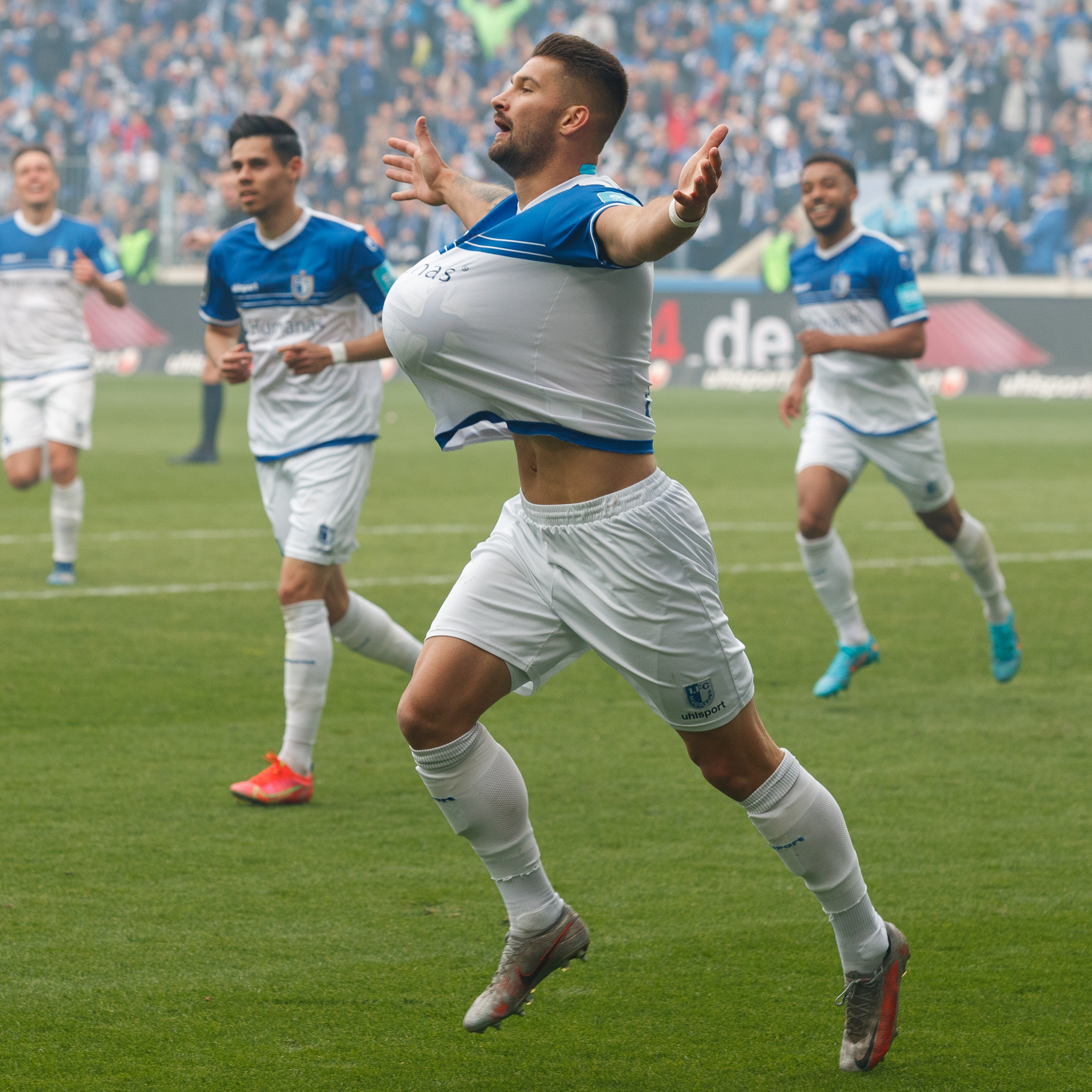
- Brünker in 2022.

Personal information
- Full name: Kai Daniel Brünker
- Date of birth: 10 June 1994 (age 32)
- Place of birth: Villingen-Schwenningen, Germany
- Height: 1.90 m (6 ft 3 in)
- Position: Striker

Team information
- Current team: 1. FC Saarbrücken
- Number: 9

Youth career
- FC Kappel
- SV Zimmern

Senior career*
Years	Team	Apps	(Gls)
2013–2015	FC 08 Villingen	39	(18)
2015–2018	SC Freiburg II	68	(26)
2018–2019	Bradford City	26	(0)
2019–2020	SG Sonnenhof Großaspach	44	(7)
2020–2023	1. FC Magdeburg	79	(12)
2023–	1. FC Saarbrücken	95	(30)
- * Club domestic league appearances and goals as of 30 May 2026

Kai Daniel Brünker (born 10 June 1994) is a German professional footballer who plays for 1. FC Saarbrücken, as a striker.

== Early and personal life ==
Brünker is from Villingen-Schwenningen; in August 2018 he stated that a number of people from his village had bought Bradford City shirts and were watching matches online. During the 2020 coronavirus outbreak in Germany he returned to stay in Villingen after the football season had been ended early.

== Career ==
Brünker spent his early career in Germany with FC Kappel, SV Zimmern, FC 08 Villingen and SC Freiburg II.

He turned professional with English club Bradford City in January 2018, signing an 18-month contract. He was signed by the club as support for Charlie Wyke. He made his debut for the club on 27 January 2018, appearing as a substitute in a 4–0 league defeat at home to AFC Wimbledon. On 12 April 2018, after Bradford's poor form, manager Simon Grayson suggested Brünker was close to making his first start for the club. He made his first start the next day, on 13 April 2018, in a 0–0 league draw at home to Shrewsbury Town. Later that month, he stated that he was becoming used to playing and living in England. Ahead of the 2018–19 season he stated he was looking forward to breaking back into the first team following an ankle injury at the end of the previous season and the appointment of Michael Collins as the new manager.

He scored his first goal for Bradford City in a 4–1 home defeat in the EFL Trophy on 9 October 2018. He described it as a "special moment".

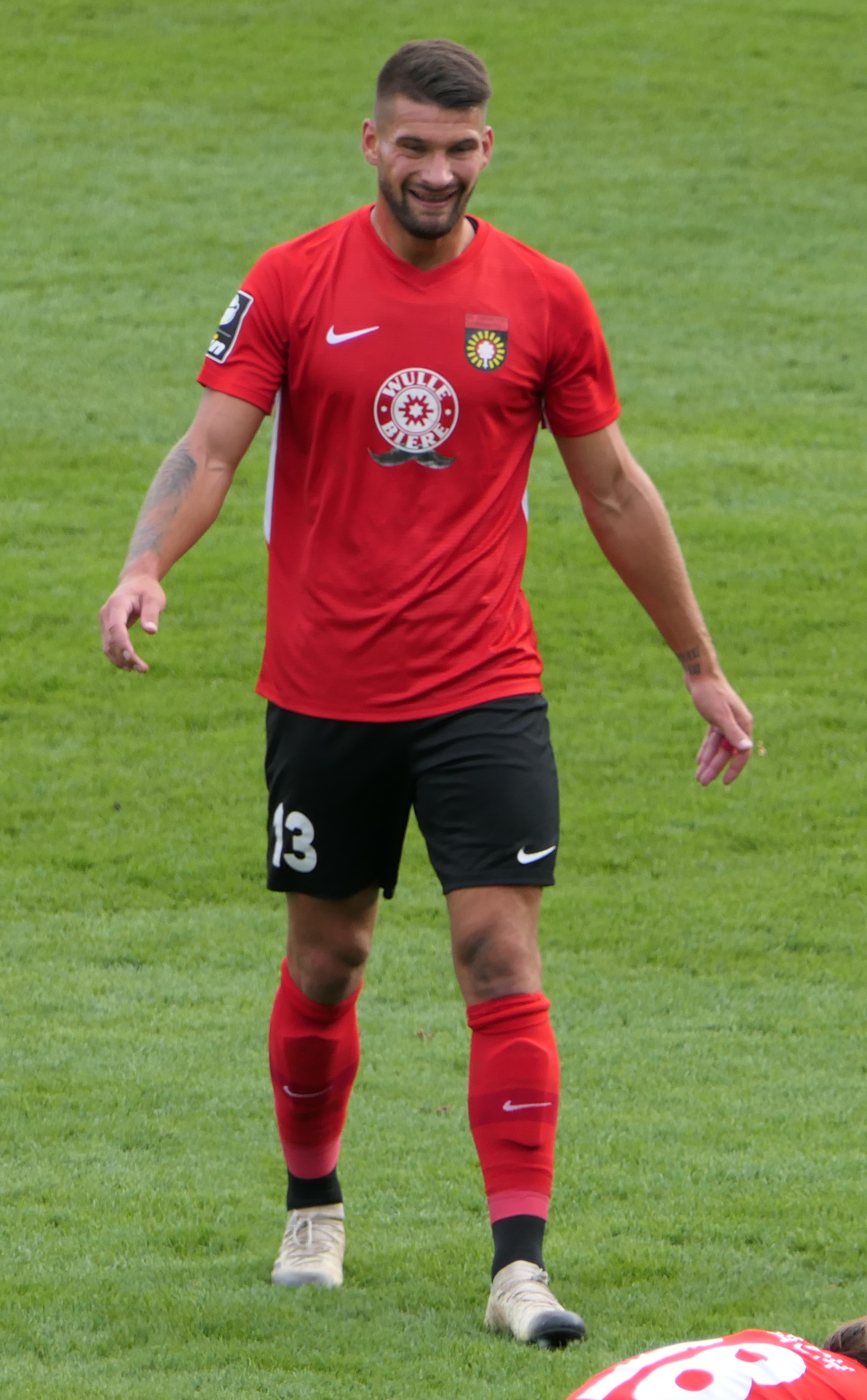
Brünker in 2022.

He left the club in January 2019, to return to Germany, signing for SG Sonnenhof Großaspach on a contract until June 2020. After leaving Bradford City he was described by the local newspaper as "a bit of a cult hero at City, but sadly it was for all the wrong reasons". At the end of the 2019–20 season, following Sonnenhof Großaspach's relegation, he signed for 1. FC Magdeburg on a two-year contract.

In June 2023, he joined 1. FC Saarbrücken. On 12 March 2024, he scored the winning goal for the latter in the stoppage time of a 2–1 victory over Borussia Mönchengladbach in the DFB-Pokal quarter-finals.

== Career statistics ==
As of 1 July 2022

Appearances and goals by club, season and competition
Club	Season	League			National cup		League cup		Other		Total	
Club	Season	Division	Apps	Goals	Apps	Goals	Apps	Goals	Apps	Goals	Apps	Goals
FC 08 Villingen	2013–14	Oberliga BW	17	9	0	0	0	0	0	0	17	9
FC 08 Villingen	2014–15	Oberliga BW	22	9	0	0	0	0	0	0	22	9
FC 08 Villingen	Total		39	18	0	0	0	0	0	0	39	18
SC Freiburg II	2015–16	Regionalliga SW	15	1	0	0	0	0	0	0	15	1
SC Freiburg II	2016–17	Oberliga BW	33	17	0	0	0	0	0	0	33	17
SC Freiburg II	2017–18	Regionalliga SW	20	8	0	0	0	0	0	0	20	8
SC Freiburg II	Total		68	26	0	0	0	0	0	0	68	26
Bradford City	2017–18	League One	9	0	0	0	0	0	0	0	9	0
Bradford City	2018–19	League One	17	0	2	0	1	0	2 (Note: Appearances in the EFL Trophy.)	1	22	1
Bradford City	Total		26	0	2	0	1	0	2	1	31	1
SG Sonnenhof Großaspach	2018–19	3. Liga	14	1	0	0	0	0	0	0	14	1
SG Sonnenhof Großaspach	2019–20	3. Liga	30	6	0	0	0	0	0	0	30	6
SG Sonnenhof Großaspach	Total		44	7	0	0	0	0	0	0	44	7
1. FC Magdeburg	2020–21	3. Liga	28	5	1	0	0	0	0	0	29	5
1. FC Magdeburg	2021–22	3. Liga	28	7	0	0	0	0	0	0	28	7
1. FC Magdeburg	Total		56	12	0	0	0	0	0	0	56	12
Career total			233	63	3	0	1	0	2	1	239	64
