= Omari Patrick =

English footballer

Personal information
- Full name: Omari Joshua Curtis Patrick
- Date of birth: 24 May 1996 (age 30)
- Place of birth: Slough, England
- Height: 6 ft 1 in (1.85 m)
- Positions: Winger; forward

Team information
- Current team: Southend United (on loan from Forest Green Rovers)

Youth career
- FAB Academy

Senior career*
Years	Team	Apps	(Gls)
2014–2015	Beaconsfield SYCOB	38	(10)
2015–2016	Kidderminster Harriers	18	(0)
2016–2017	Barnsley	0	(0)
2017–2020	Bradford City	22	(2)
2018–2019	→ Yeovil Town (loan)	9	(1)
2019–2020	→ Wrexham (loan)	10	(5)
2020–2021	Carlisle United	44	(7)
2021–2022	Burton Albion	7	(0)
2022–2023	Carlisle United	56	(13)
2023–2024	Sutton United	35	(5)
2024–2026	Tranmere Rovers	81	(18)
2026–	Forest Green Rovers	10	(1)
2026–	→ Southend United (loan)	0	(0)
- * Club domestic league appearances and goals as of 19:30, 27 October 2026 (UTC)

Omari Joshua Curtis Patrick (born 24 May 1996) is an English professional footballer who plays as a winger and forward for Southend United, on loan from National League club Forest Green Rovers.

He trained at the FAB Academy and started his career in non-League with Beaconsfield SYCOB. He signed his first professional contract with Kidderminster Harriers and signed for his first EFL club with Barnsley, before moving to Bradford City a season later, where he made his Football League debut.

== Early and personal life ==
Patrick was born in Slough. His father is Commonwealth Games Gold-winning athlete Adrian Patrick, and his godfather is sprinter Linford Christie.

== Career ==
=== Beaconsfield SYCOB ===
After leaving the FAB Academy, Patrick joined Beaconsfield SYCOB after having unsuccessful trials with Brentford, Barnet and Rangers. He scored on his debut against Bedford Town. Whilst at the club he scored 14 goals in 49 matches over one and a half seasons, and went on trial to Oxford United.

=== Kidderminster Harriers ===
On 5 December 2015, Patrick signed a contract with National League side Kidderminster Harriers. He made his debut from the bench on the same day, against Gateshead. At the end of the season, following Harriers' relegation and 18 appearances, Patrick was offered a new contract.

=== Barnsley ===
Following an impressive trial for Barnsley U23s, during which he scored against Ipswich Town U23s, he signed a one-year contract with the club on 21 September 2016. He was initially assigned to the development squad. He never made a first-team appearance for Barnsley.

=== Bradford City ===
He signed a one-year contract with Bradford City in May 2017. Following some "impressive" performances in pre-season friendlies, Patrick was praised by Bradford manager Stuart McCall. He started the first game of the 2017–18 season, scoring the winning goal. Following an "impressive start" to the season, Patrick signed a new three-year contract with the club in August 2017. He was dropped from the first-team halfway through the 2017–18 season, and also suffered a knee injury.

On 28 August 2018, Patrick joined League Two side Yeovil Town on loan until January 2019. His loan ended on 2 January 2019.

On 21 November 2019 he moved on loan to Wrexham, initially for one month. On 19 December the loan was extended for a second month. He returned to Bradford City at the end of his loan on 20 January 2020.

=== Carlisle United ===
Patrick signed an 18-month contract with Carlisle United on 31 January 2020.

=== Burton Albion ===
On 8 June 2021 it was announced that he would sign for Burton Albion on 1 July 2021, on a two-year contract.

=== Return to Carlisle United ===
On 6 January 2022, Patrick returned to Carlisle United on an 18-month contract. On 11 January 2022, Patrick joined Paul Baker, Paul Murray, and Hugh McIlmoyle as one of just four Carlisle players to score on his second permanent debut for the club.

In May 2023 he scored a goal in the League Two play-off final. He left the club at the end of the season.

=== Sutton United ===
In July 2023 he signed for Sutton United. Following relegation at the end of the 2023–24 season, Patrick departed the club having rejected the offer of a new contract.

=== Tranmere Rovers ===
In August 2024 he signed for Tranmere Rovers. He scored 4 goals that month, becoming the club's top scorer, but by 11 October hadn't scored again.

On 12 May 2026, the club announced he would be leaving in the summer once his contract expired.

=== Forest Green Rovers ===
Following the expiry of his contract at Tranmere, on 22 July 2026 it was announced that Patrick had signed for Forest Green Rovers on a two-year contract.

On 27 October 2026, Patrick joined fellow National League side Southend United on loan until the end of the 2026–27 season.

== Playing style ==
Patrick can play across the forward line as a striker or a winger. Upon his signing for Barnsley, Bobby Hassell said "he's quick and strong so he will be a dangerous asset in our attacking play. He is also very hard working off the ball, which is a very important and a valuable skill to have." He has been described by Bradford City Head of Recruitment Greg Abbott as being "lightning quick" and that he "runs in behind [the defence] and is good with both feet".

== Career statistics ==
As of match played 25 April 2026

Appearances and goals by club, season and competition
Club	Season	League			FA Cup		EFL Cup		Other		Total	
Club	Season	Division	Apps	Goals	Apps	Goals	Apps	Goals	Apps	Goals	Apps	Goals
Beaconsfield SYCOB	2014–15	SFL Division One Central	25	6	4	1	—		2 (Note: One appearance in FA Trophy, one appearance in Berks & Bucks Senior Cup)	0	31	7
Beaconsfield SYCOB	2015–16	SFL Division One Central	13	4	1	0	—		4 (Note: One appearance in FA Trophy, one appearance and one goal in Southern League Cup, two appearances and two goals in Berks & Bucks Senior Cup)	3	18	7
Beaconsfield SYCOB	Total		38	10	5	1	0	0	6	3	49	14
Kidderminster Harriers	2015–16	National League	18	0	0	0	—		0	0	18	0
Barnsley	2016–17	Championship	0	0	0	0	0	0	—		0	0
Bradford City	2017–18	League One	19	2	0	0	1	0	4 (Note: Appearance(s) in the EFL Trophy.)	1	24	3
Bradford City	2018–19	League One	1	0	0	0	0	0	0	0	1	0
Bradford City	2019–20	League Two	2	0	0	0	1	0	3	0	6	0
Bradford City	Total		22	2	0	0	2	0	7	1	31	3
Yeovil Town (loan)	2018–19	League Two	9	1	1	0	0	0	3	0	13	1
Wrexham (loan)	2019–20	National League	10	5	0	0	—		0	0	10	5
Carlisle United	2019–20	League Two	7	2	—		—		—		7	2
Carlisle United	2020–21	League Two	37	5	2	0	0	0	1	0	40	5
Carlisle United	Total		44	7	2	0	0	0	1	0	47	7
Burton Albion	2021–22	League One	7	0	1	0	1	0	3	0	12	0
Carlisle United	2021–22	League Two	24	9	0	0	0	0	0	0	24	9
Carlisle United	2022–23	League Two	32	4	0	0	1	0	5 (Note: Two appearances in the EFL Trophy, three appearances and one goal in the play-offs.)	1	38	5
Carlisle United	Total		56	13	0	0	1	0	5	1	62	14
Sutton United	2023–24	League Two	35	5	3	1	3	0	2	0	43	6
Tranmere Rovers	2024–25	League Two	46	11	1	0	3	1	1	1	51	13
Tranmere Rovers	2025–26	League Two	35	7	1	1	1	0	3	0	40	8
Tranmere Rovers	Total		81	18	2	1	4	1	4	1	91	21
Forest Green Rovers	2026–27	National League	0	0	0	0	—		0	0	40	8
Career total			320	61	14	3	11	1	31	6	376	71

== Honours ==
Carlisle United

- EFL League Two play-offs: 2023
