= 2017–18 Bradford City A.F.C. season =

Bradford City A.F.C.
2017–18 season
- Chairman: Edic Rahic; Stefan Rupp
- Manager: Stuart McCall (until 5 February); Simon Grayson (Between 11 February–8 May); Michael Collins (from 18 June)
- Stadium: Valley Parade
- League One: 11th
- FA Cup: Round 3 (vs. Yeovil Town)
- EFL Cup: Round 1 (vs. Doncaster Rovers)
- EFL Trophy: Round 2 (vs. Oldham Athletic)
- Top goalscorer: League: Charlie Wyke (14); All: Charlie Wyke (15)
- Highest home attendance: 21,403 vs. Blackburn Rovers (League One)
- Lowest home attendance: 931 vs. Rotherham United (EFL Trophy)
Home colours	Away colours	Third colours

The 2017–18 season will be Bradford City's 115th season in their history, in the Football League and in the English football league system. Along with League One, the club will also compete in the FA Cup, EFL Cup and EFL Trophy. The season covers the period from 1 July 2017 to 30 June 2018.

== Preseason ==
As of 13 July 2017, Bradford City have announced seven preseason friendlies against Guiseley, Sunderland, Newcastle United, FC Halifax Town, Bradford Park Avenue, TV Echterdingen and Eccleshill United.

Date	Opponents	H / A	Result F–A	Scorers	Attendance
8 July 2017	Bradford Park Avenue	A	0–3		2,020
15 July 2017	TV Echterdingen	A	4–1	Dieng 39', McCartan 78', Patrick 84', Pybus 86'	N/A
18 July 2017	Guiseley	A	2–1	Trialist 64', McMahon 76'	N/A
19 July 2017	Eccleshill United	A	3–0	Robinson 68', Pybus (2) 75', 84'	N/A
22 July 2017	Sunderland	H	2–3	McMahon 65' (pen.), Trialist 90'	3,902
26 July 2017	Newcastle United	H	0–4		7,601
29 July 2017	FC Halifax Town	A	3–0	Patrick 47', Hudson (2) 80', 83'	N/A
15 August 2017	Wigan Athletic	A	3–2	Devine, McCartan (2)	0

== League One ==
=== League table ===
Pos	Team	Pld	W	D	L	GF	GA	GD	Pts
9	Peterborough United	46	17	13	16	68	60	+8	64
10	Southend United	46	17	12	17	58	62	−4	63
11	Bradford City	46	18	9	19	57	67	−10	63
12	Blackpool	46	15	15	16	60	55	+5	60
13	Bristol Rovers	46	16	11	19	60	66	−6	59

Source: BBC Sport
Rules for classification: 1) Points; 2) Goal difference; 3) Number of goals scored

=== Result summary ===
Overall								Home						Away					
Pld	W	D	L	GF	GA	GD	Pts	W	D	L	GF	GA	GD	W	D	L	GF	GA	GD
27	15	3	9	43	36	+7	48	6	1	7	19	21	−2	9	2	2	24	15	+9

Last updated: 9 December 2017.
Source: Statto.com

=== Matches ===
On 21 June 2017, the fixtures for the forthcoming season were announced.

Date	Opponents	H / A	Result F–A	Scorers	Attendance	Position
5 August 2017	Blackpool	H	2–1	Knight-Percival 41', Patrick 59'	20,804	4th
12 August 2017	Gillingham	A	1–0	Poleon 19'	5,267	4th
19 August 2017	Blackburn Rovers	H	0–1		21,403	7th
26 August 2017	Walsall	A	3–3	McCartan 30', Poleon 38', Leahy 49' (o.g.)	4,817	9th
2 September 2017	Bristol Rovers	H	3–1	Wyke (3) 13', 62', 73'	19,284	6th
9 September 2017	Peterborough United	A	3–1	Poleon 7', Vincelot 36', Kilgallon 40'	7,061	4th
12 September 2017	Oxford United	A	2–2	Patrick 30', Vincelot 90+4'	6,558	4th
16 September 2017	Rotherham United	H	1–0	Vincelot 21'	20,881	3rd
23 September 2017	Northampton Town	A	1–0	McMahon 34'	6,355	3rd
26 September 2017	Fleetwood Town	H	0–3		18,799	4th
30 September 2017	Doncaster Rovers	H	2–0	Wyke 18', Knight-Percival 42'	20,430	3rd
7 October 2017	Milton Keynes Dons	A	4–1	Vincelot 11', Wyke (2) 18', 71', Taylor 82'	9,106	3rd
14 October 2017	Bury	A	1–3	Wyke 9'	5,514	3rd
17 October 2017	Oldham Athletic	H	1–1	Taylor 3'	19,840	3rd
21 October 2017	Charlton Athletic	H	0–1		20,066	3rd
28 October 2017	Portsmouth	A	1–0	Kilgallon 80'	18,067	3rd
11 November 2017	Plymouth Argyle	H	0–1		20,227	4th
18 November 2017	Wigan Athletic	A	2–1	Wyke 14', Robinson 90+2'	10,649	3rd
21 November 2017	Scunthorpe United	H	1–2	Taylor 44'	19,163	5th
25 November 2017	Shrewsbury Town	A	1–0	Nsiala 55' (o.g.)	7,165	4th
9 December 2017	Rochdale	H	4–3	Kilgallon 8', Wyke 40', Poleon 42', Robinson 78'	19,621	4th
16 December 2017	Southend United	A	2–1	Poleon 9', Wyke 90' (pen.)	6,097	4th
23 December 2017	AFC Wimbledon	A	1–2	Taylor 47'	4,215	5th
26 December 2017	Peterbourgh United	H	1–3	Taylor 83'	21,220	5th
30 December 2017	Oxford United	H	3–2	Wyke 2', McCartan 54', Dieng 59'	19,691	5th
1 January 2018	Fleetwood Town	A	2–1	Gilliead 56', McCartan 63'	3,089	5th
13 January 2018	Northampton Town	H	1–2	Taylor 90+2'	19,343	5th
20 January 2018	Bristol Rovers	A	1–3	Wyke 38' (pen.)	9,064	5th
23 January 2018	Rotherham United	A	0–2		8,904	5th
27 January 2018	AFC Wimbledon	H	0–4		19,103	5th
3 February 2018	Oldham Athletic	A	1–2	Gibson 88'	5,526	6th
10 February 2018	Bury	H	2–2	Dieng 58', McCartan 89'	19,476	6th
13 February 2018	Charlton Athletic	A	1–1	Robinson 80'	10,650	6th
24 February 2018	Plymouth Argyle	A	0–1		11,113	8th
14 March 2018	Wigan Athletic	H	0–1		19,413	10th
19 March 2018	Doncaster Rovers	A	0–2		7,369	11th
24 March 2018	Gillingham	H	1–0	Poleon 48'	19,654	9th
29 March 2018	Blackburn Rovers	A	0–2		13,443	10th
7 April 2018	Blackpool	A	0–5		5,337	12th
12 April 2018	Shrewsbury Town	H	0–0		18,997	12th
17 April 2018	Portsmouth	H	3–1	Knight-Percival 14', Lund 71', Wyke 90+5'	19,554	10th
21 April 2018	Rochdale	A	1–1	Wyke 90+1'	4,365	11th
24 April 2018	Milton Keynes Dons	H	2–0	Dieng 12', Knight-Percival 80'	19,192	10th
28 April 2018	Southend United	H	0–2		19,960	11th
1 May 2018	Walsall	H	1–1	Lund 45+1'	18,976	11th
5 May 2018	Scunthorpe United	A	1–1	Kilgallon 56'	5,452	11th

== FA Cup ==
In the FA Cup, Bradford City were drawn at home to Chesterfield for the first round, Plymouth Argyle also at home in the second round and either Port Vale or Yeovil Town away in the third round. The latter won their replayed match 3–2 (a.e.t.) to host the Bantams.

Date	Round	Opponents	H / A	Result F–A	Scorers	Attendance
4 November 2017	Round 1	Chesterfield	H	2–0	Gilliead 4', Jones 44'	4,747
2 December 2017	Round 2	Plymouth Argyle	H	3–1	Vincelot 38', Knight-Percival 50', Wyke 64'	4,957
6 January 2018	Round 3	Yeovil Town	A	0–2		3,040

== EFL Cup ==
On 16 June 2017, Bradford City were drawn at home to Doncaster Rovers in the first round.

Date	Round	Opponents	H / A	Result F–A	Scorers	Attendance
8 August 2017	Round 1	Doncaster Rovers	H	2–3	Poleon 35', Jones 84'	3,175

== EFL Trophy ==
On 12 July 2017 the group stage draw was completed with Bradford City facing Chesterfield, Manchester City U23 and Rotherham United. After winning their group, Bradford City were drawn at home to either Oldham Athletic or Fleetwood Town.

Pos	Lge	Team	Pld	W	PW	PL	L	GF	GA	GD	Pts	Qualification
1	L1	Bradford City (Q)	3	2	0	0	1	6	6	0	6	Round 2
2	L2	Chesterfield (Q)	3	1	1	0	1	6	7	−1	5	Round 2
3	L1	Rotherham United (E)	3	1	0	1	1	5	3	+2	4	
4	ACA	Manchester City EDS (E)	3	0	1	1	1	4	5	−1	3	

Updated to match(es) played on 7 November 2017. Source: EFL.com
(E) Eliminated; (Q) Qualified to the phase indicated

Date	Round	Opponents	H / A	Result F–A	Scorers	Attendance
29 August 2017	Group Stage	Chesterfield	A	4–2	Patrick 45+4', Jones (2) 57', 62', Hanson 80'	1,099
24 October 2017	Group Stage	Manchester City U21s	H	2–1	Thompson 18', Jones 35'	1,260
7 November 2017	Group Stage	Rotherham United	H	0–3		931
5 December 2017	Round 2	Oldham Athletic	H	0–1		1,036

== Squad statistics ==
No.	Pos.	Name	League		FA Cup		EFL Cup		EFL Trophy		Total		Discipline	
No.	Pos.	Name	Apps	Goals	Apps	Goals	Apps	Goals	Apps	Goals	Apps	Goals	Yellow card	Red card
1	GK	(Republic of Ireland) Colin Doyle	35	0	1	0	1	0	0(1)	0	37(1)	0	2	0
2	DF	(Australia) Ryan McGowan	3	0	0	0	0	0	0	0	3	0	1	0
3	DF	(England) Adam Chicksen	16(2)	0	0	0	0	0	0	0	16(2)	0	4	1
4	MF	(England) Jake Reeves	24(1)	0	1	0	1	0	0	0	26(1)	0	3	0
5	DF	(England) Matthew Kilgallon	42	4	3	0	0(1)	0	0	0	45(1)	4	5	1
6	MF	(France) Romain Vincelot	37(1)	4	3	1	1	0	1	0	42(1)	5	9	1
7	MF	(England) Nicky Law	33(5)	0	2(1)	0	0	0	0(2)	0	35(8)	0	0	0
8	MF	(France) Timothee Dieng	19(7)	3	2	0	1	0	1	0	23(7)	3	8	0
9	FW	(England) Charlie Wyke	38(2)	14	3	1	0	0	0	0	41(2)	15	2	2
10	FW	(England) Paul Taylor	18(9)	6	3	0	0(1)	0	1(1)	0	22(11)	6	2	0
11	FW	(England) Dominic Poleon	16(16)	6	0(2)	0	1	1	1(1)	0	18(19)	7	2	0
12	GK	(Germany) Rouven Sattelmaier	10(1)	0	1	0	0	0	2	0	13(1)	0	1	0
14	FW	(Northern Ireland) Shay McCartan	13(11)	4	1	0	0	0	3	0	17(11)	4	3	0
15	DF	(England) Stephen Warnock	13	0	0	0	0	0	0	0	13	0	1	0
16	DF	(England) Jacob Hanson	1(2)	0	1	0	0	0	3	1	5(2)	1	0	0
17	MF	(England) Alex Gilliead	36(6)	1	3	1	1	0	2	0	42(6)	2	3	0
18	MF	(England) Callum Guy	15(2)	0	0	0	0	0	0	0	15(2)	0	3	0
19	FW	(England) Alex Jones	4(3)	0	1	1	0(1)	1	2	3	7(4)	5	1	0
20	DF	(England) Daniel Pybus	0(1)	0	0	0	1	0	4	0	5(1)	0	0	0
21	FW	(Germany) Kai Bruenker	5(4)	0	0	0	0	0	0	0	5(4)	0	1	0
22	DF	(England) Nathaniel Knight-Percival	40(1)	4	2	1	1	0	2	0	45(1)	5	7	0
23	GK	(Germany) Lukas Raeder	1	0	1	0	0	0	2	0	4	0	0	0
24	MF	(England) Daniel Devine	0(3)	0	0(2)	0	0	0	4	0	4(5)	0	1	0
25	FW	(England) Reece Webb-Foster	0	0	0	0	0	0	0	0	0	0	0	0
27	FW	(England) Jordan Gibson	1(4)	1	0	0	0	0	3(1)	0	4(5)	1	0	0
28	MF	(England) Cameron Hawkes	0(2)	0	0	0	0	0	0	0	0(2)	0	0	0
29	DF	(England) Tony McMahon	38	1	1	0	1	0	0	0	40	1	10	0
30	DF	(England) Matthew Lund	7(3)	2	0	0	0	0	0	0	7(3)	2	1	0
31	MF	(England) Curtis Peters	0	0	0	0	0	0	0	0	0	0	0	0
32	MF	(England) Ellis Hudson	0	0	0	0	0	0	0(2)	0	0(2)	0	0	0
33	FW	(England) Alex Laird	0	0	0	0	0	0	1(1)	0	1(1)	0	0	0
34	FW	(England) Omari Patrick	8(11)	2	0	0	1	0	3(1)	1	12(12)	3	1	0
35	DF	(England) Tyrell Robinson	13(8)	3	2(1)	0	0	0	2	0	17(9)	3	1	0
36	MF	(Scotland) Callum Gunner	0	0	0	0	0	0	0	0	0	0	0	0
37	FW	(Germany) Joel Grodowski	0(1)	0	0	0	0	0	0	0	0(1)	0	0	0
38	MF	(England) Jake Maltby	0	0	0	0	0	0	0(1)	0	0(1)	0	0	0
39	DF	(England) Reece Staunton	0(1)	0	0	0	0	0	0(1)	0	0(2)	0	0	0
-	DF	(Northern Ireland) Adam Thompson	4(5)	0	1(1)	0	0	0	3	1	8(6)	1	2	0
-	DF	(Republic of Ireland) Tom Field	7(1)	0	0	0	1	0	0	0	8(1)	0	1	0
-	DF	(England) Luke Hendrie	9(4)	0	1(1)	0	0	0	3	0	13(5)	0	1	0
-	DF	(Australia) Lachlan Barr	0(1)	0	0	0	0	0	1	0	1(1)	0	0	0
-	–	Own goals	–	2	–	0	–	0	–	0	–	2	–	–

Statistics accurate as of 5 May 2018

== Transfers ==
=== Transfers in ===
Date from	Position	Nationality	Name	From	Fee	Ref.
1 July 2017	LB	(England)	Adam Chicksen	Charlton Athletic	Free	
1 July 2017	CM	(Scotland)	Callum Gunner	Swindon Town	Free	
1 July 2017	ST	(Northern Ireland)	Shay McCartan	Accrington Stanley	Undisclosed	
1 July 2017	CF	(England)	Omari Patrick	Barnsley	Free	
1 July 2017	LB	(England)	Tyrell Robinson	Free agent	Free	
1 July 2017	CF	(England)	Dominic Poleon	AFC Wimbledon	Undisclosed	
1 July 2017	ST	(England)	Paul Taylor	Peterborough United	Free	
4 July 2017	CM	(England)	Jake Reeves	AFC Wimbledon	£150,000	
7 July 2017	CB	(Australia)	Lachlan Barr	FC Internationale Berlin	Free	
7 July 2017	ST	(Germany)	Joel Grodowski	PSV Bork	Free	
15 August 2017	FW	(England)	Jordan Gibson	Rangers	Free	
31 August 2017	GK	(Germany)	Lukas Raeder	Vitória de Setúbal	Free	
25 January 2018	ST	(Germany)	Kai Bruenker	SC Freiburg	Free	
26 January 2018	DF	(Australia)	Ryan McGowan	Al-Sharjah	Free	

=== Transfers out ===
Date from	Position	Nationality	Name	To	Fee	Ref.
1 July 2017	SS	(Republic of Ireland)	Billy Clarke	Charlton Athletic	Undisclosed	
1 July 2017	GK	(England)	Joe Cracknell	Free agent	Released	
1 July 2017	RB	(England)	Stephen Darby	Bolton Wanderers	Released	(Note: Stephen Darby joined Bolton Wanderers following his release.)
1 July 2017	CB	(England)	James King	Free agent	Released	
1 July 2017	LW	(Jamaica)	Mark Marshall	Charlton Athletic	Free	
1 July 2017	CB	(England)	Rory McArdle	Scunthorpe United	Free	
1 July 2017	LB	(Australia)	James Meredith	Millwall	Free	

=== Loans in ===
Start date	Position	Nationality	Name	From	End date	Ref.
7 July 2017	RW	(England)	Alex Gilliead	Newcastle United	January 2018	
30 August 2017	CB	(Northern Ireland)	Adam Thompson	Bury	30 June 2018	
12 January 2018	MF	(England)	Callum Guy	Derby County	30 June 2018	
26 January 2018	DF	(England)	Matty Lund	Burton Albion	30 June 2018	
26 January 2018	DF	(England)	Stephen Warnock	Burton Albion	30 June 2018	

=== Loans out ===
Start date	Position	Nationality	Name	To	End date	Ref.
23 November 2017	CB	(Australia)	Lachlan Barr	Harrogate Town	24 December 2017	
23 November 2017	RM	(England)	Ellis Hudson	Harrogate Town	24 December 2017	
