= Cameron Hawkes =

English footballer

Personal information
- Date of birth: 15 March 2000 (age 26)
- Position: Midfielder

Youth career
- Sheffield United

Senior career*
Years	Team	Apps	(Gls)
2018–2019	Bradford City	2	(0)
2019	→ Boston United (loan)	3	(0)
- * Club domestic league appearances and goals as of 22:28, 13 June 2019 (UTC)

Cameron Hawkes (born 15 March 2000) is an English professional footballer who plays as a midfielder.

== Career ==
After playing for Sheffield United, he signed a one-year professional contract with Bradford City in March 2018. He made his professional debut on 1 May 2018, in a 1–1 home draw in the league against Walsall, appearing as a 67th minute substitute for Callum Guy. On 28 March 2019, Hawkes was loaned out to Boston United for the rest of the season.

In May 2019, following Bradford City's relegation to League Two, it was announced that he would leave the club upon the expiry of his contract on 30 June 2019, one of 11 players to be released.

== Career statistics ==
As of match played 5 May 2018

Appearances and goals by club, season and competition
Club	Season	League			FA Cup		League Cup		Other		Total	
Club	Season	Division	Apps	Goals	Apps	Goals	Apps	Goals	Apps	Goals	Apps	Goals
Bradford City	2017–18	League One	2	0	0	0	0	0	0	0	2	0
Bradford City	2018–19	League One	0	0	0	0	0	0	0	0	0	0
Career total			2	0	0	0	0	0	0	0	2	0
