= Jordan Gibson =

English footballer (born 1998)

Personal information
- Full name: Jordan Lewis Gibson
- Date of birth: 28 February 1998 (age 28)
- Place of birth: Birmingham, England
- Height: 5 ft 10 in (1.78 m)
- Position: Winger

Team information
- Current team: Crewe Alexandra
- Number: 14

Youth career
- 2015–2017: Rangers

Senior career*
Years	Team	Apps	(Gls)
2017–2020	Bradford City	22	(1)
2019	→ Stevenage (loan)	6	(1)
2020	St Patrick's Athletic	14	(2)
2021	Sligo Rovers	22	(7)
2021–2024	Carlisle United	124	(15)
2024–2026	Doncaster Rovers	82	(9)
2026–	Crewe Alexandra	15	(5)
- * Club domestic league appearances and goals as of 16:32, 21 November 2026 (UTC)

Jordan Lewis Gibson (born 28 February 1998) is an English professional footballer who plays as a winger for EFL League Two club Crewe Alexandra.

== Career ==
=== Early career ===
Born in Birmingham, Gibson played youth football with Rangers, joining the Scottish club in June 2015.

=== Bradford City ===
After being released by Rangers, he went on trial with Bradford City, signing a one-year contract with the club in August 2017. He made his professional debut on 29 August 2017, in a Football League Trophy game, and started to be considered part of the first team squad in November 2017. The next month he stated that he wished his break into the first team. He scored his first goal for Bradford in a 2–1 loss against Oldham Athletic on 3 February 2018.

In May 2018 he signed a new two-year contract with Bradford City. Later that month he criticised comments made about him by former City manager Simon Grayson.

In September 2018 he stated that he wished to play more first-team football, and also praised young teammates Eliot Goldthorp and Reece Staunton.

In January 2019 he was linked with a loan move to EFL League Two side Stevenage. The deal was completed on transfer deadline day, 31 January 2019. Gibson scored on his final game for the club, a 2–0 win over Cheltenham Town on the final day of the season, as Stevenage missed out on a play-off spot.

After his loan deal ended and he returned to Bradford City, new manager Gary Bowyer confirmed that he was in his first-team plans for the 2019–20 season. After starting the first game of the season, Gibson said that his self-belief had been encouraged by Bowyer. Gibson missed City's first victory of the season due to a hamstring injury, and remained injured into October 2019. By early December he was nearing fitness.

On 26 May 2020 it was announced that he was one of 10 players who would leave Bradford City when their contract expired on 30 June 2020. During his time with Bradford City he made 11 starts, appearing for six different managers.

=== St Patrick's Athletic ===
In July 2020 he signed for Irish club St Patrick's Athletic. Gibson made his debut on 31 July 2020 in a 1–1 draw away to champions Dundalk at Oriel Park. On 3 October 2020, Gibson scored his first goal for the club, netting what turned out to be the winning goal in a 2–1 win away to Cork City at Turners Cross. He scored in what turned out to be the last of his 15 appearances for the club, opening the scoring in a 2–1 loss at home to Dublin rivals Bohemians on 9 November 2020 as his side missed out on European football on the last day of the season.

=== Sligo Rovers ===
On 4 January 2021 it was announced that Gibson had signed for fellow League of Ireland Premier Division club Sligo Rovers. He scored his first goal for the club in his second appearance, away to Waterford on 26 March 2021, setting up the equalizer for Romeo Parkes before going on to score a spectacular winner in the 53rd minute.

=== Carlisle United ===
He returned to England on 30 August 2021, signing with Carlisle United. Gibson scored his first goal for the club on 18 September, against Scunthorpe United in a 2–2 draw.

On 7 October 2023, Gibson scored a hat-trick in a 3–1 win over Bolton Wanderers. Following relegation in the 2023–24 season, he was released by the club at the end of the season.

=== Doncaster Rovers ===
In May 2024, it was announced that he would sign for Doncaster Rovers on 1 July 2024.

Gibson made his debut for Doncaster on 10 August 2024, in a 4–1 opening-day victory over Accrington Stanley in League Two. He marked the occasion by scoring his first goal for the club, a long-range strike that extended Doncaster’s lead in the second half.

During the 2024–25 season, Gibson became an important attacking player for Doncaster as they mounted a successful promotion campaign. He contributed regularly in league and cup competitions and scored several goals as part of the squad that won EFL League Two and earned promotion to League One.

On 26 April 2025, Gibson featured in the 2–1 victory over Bradford City that secured Doncaster’s automatic promotion to League One, with teammate Billy Sharp scoring the winner. Gibson hit the woodwork during the match as Doncaster clinched promotion on the penultimate weekend of the season.

In the 2025–26 season, Gibson continued as a regular in the first team following Doncaster’s promotion to EFL League One. On 12 August 2025 in the Carabao Cup First Round, Doncaster stunned Middlesbrough with a 4–0 victory at the Riverside Stadium; Gibson played a key role in Doncaster’s attacking play, helping create pressure and involvement in the build-up to the early goals as the League One side eliminated their Championship opponents

In September 2025, Gibson scored against former club Bradford City, subsequently receiving racist abuse online from a Bradford City fan.

On 29 November 2025, Gibson scored both goals in Doncaster’s 2–1 League One victory over Peterborough United at the Eco-Power Stadium, opening the scoring in the seventh minute and doubling the lead on 24 minutes to help end a ten-game winless run.

He was released by the club upon the expiry of his contract at the end of the 2025–26 season.

=== Crewe Alexandra ===
On 9 June 2026, Gibson agreed to join League Two club Crewe Alexandra on an initial three-year deal with the option for a further year.

== Career statistics ==
As of match played 21 November 2026

Appearances and goals by club, season and competition
Club	Season	League			National Cup		League Cup		Other		Total	
Club	Season	Division	Apps	Goals	Apps	Goals	Apps	Goals	Apps	Goals	Apps	Goals
Rangers U20	2016–17	—	—		—		—		1 (Note: Appearance(s) in the Scottish Challenge Cup.)	0	1	0
Bradford City	2017–18	League One	5	1	0	0	0	0	4 (Note: Appearance(s) in the EFL Trophy.)	0	9	1
Bradford City	2018–19	League One	11	0	0	0	0	0	2	0	13	0
Bradford City	2019–20	League Two	6	0	0	0	0	0	1	0	7	0
Bradford City	Total		22	1	0	0	0	0	7	0	29	1
Stevenage (loan)	2018–19	League Two	6	1	—		—		—		6	1
St Patrick's Athletic	2020	LOI Premier Division	14	2	1	0	—		—		15	2
Sligo Rovers	2021	LOI Premier Division	22	7	1	0	—		2 (Note: Appearance(s) in the UEFA Europa Conference League.)	0	25	7
Carlisle United	2021–22	League Two	39	6	2	1	0	0	3	1	44	8
Carlisle United	2022–23	League Two	45	2	2	1	1	0	6	0	54	3
Carlisle United	2023–24	League One	40	7	1	0	1	0	3	2	45	9
Carlisle United	Total		124	15	5	2	2	0	12	3	143	20
Doncaster Rovers	2024–25	League Two	42	6	4	0	2	0	4	0	52	6
Doncaster Rovers	2025–26	League One	40	3	3	1	3	0	5	2	51	6
Doncaster Rovers	Total		82	9	7	1	5	0	9	2	103	12
Crewe Alexandra	2026–27	League Two	15	5	1	0	2	0	2	1	20	6
Career total			285	40	15	3	9	0	33	6	342	49

== Honours ==
Carlisle United

- EFL League Two play-offs: 2023

Doncaster Rovers

- EFL League Two: 2024–25
