= Ryan McGowan =

Australian association football player

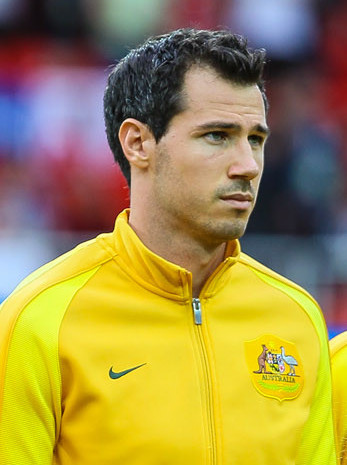
- McGowan with Australia at the 2017 FIFA Confederations Cup

Personal information
- Full name: Ryan James McGowan
- Date of birth: 15 August 1989 (age 37)
- Place of birth: Adelaide, Australia
- Height: 1.91 m (6 ft 3 in)
- Positions: Defender; midfielder

Team information
- Current team: Livingston
- Number: 5

Youth career
- 2001–2004: Para Hills Knights
- 2004–2006: SASI
- 2006–2008: Heart of Midlothian

Senior career*
Years	Team	Apps	(Gls)
2006	Para Hills Knights	10	(1)
2008–2013	Heart of Midlothian	57	(2)
2009–2010	→ Ayr United (loan)	28	(1)
2011	→ Partick Thistle (loan)	8	(0)
2013–2014	Shandong Luneng Taishan	46	(2)
2015–2016	Dundee United	34	(1)
2016	Henan Jianye	28	(2)
2017	Guizhou Zhicheng	12	(0)
2017–2018	Al-Sharjah	10	(0)
2018–2019	Bradford City	26	(1)
2019	→ Dundee (loan)	15	(0)
2019–2021	Sydney FC	50	(1)
2021–2022	Kuwait SC	15	(1)
2022–2024	St Johnstone	57	(2)
2024–	Livingston	62	(0)

International career^{‡}
2005–2006	Australia U17	3	(0)
2007–2009	Australia U20	21	(0)
2011–2012	Australia U23	3	(0)
2012–2021	Australia	22	(0)
- * Club domestic league appearances and goals as of 4 September 2026 ‡ National team caps and goals as of 2 February 2022

Ryan James McGowan (born 15 August 1989) is an Australian soccer player who plays as a defender for Scottish Championship club Livingston.

He has previously played for Para Hills Knights, Heart of Midlothian, Shandong Luneng Taishan, Dundee United, Henan Jianye, Guizhou Zhicheng, Al-Sharjah, Bradford City, Sydney FC, Kuwait SC and St Johnstone, with loan spells at Ayr United, Partick Thistle and Dundee.

McGowan has represented Australia at under-17, under-20, under-23 and at senior levels. McGowan has been officially designated as Socceroo #546 (2012).

== Club career ==
=== Heart of Midlothian ===
McGowan began his career at Para Hills Knights and was part of the South Australian Sports Institute, before moving to Scottish Premier League club Hearts in 2006 and was promoted to the first-team in 2008. He was the captain of Hearts' under 19 squad before making his SPL debut as substitute on 13 May that year in the final league match of the 2007–08 season against Gretna. Shortly after he signed a five-year contract with the club.

After just the one first team appearance he was sent out on loan to Ayr United in October 2009. His debut for Ayr came on 14 October, when he scored one of the goals in a 2–2 draw at home to Dundee. In January 2010, the loan was extended until the end of the season. In total, he made 30 appearances in all competitions, scoring one goal for Ayr.

On his return under new manager Jim Jefferies he played as a substitute against Hamilton on 21 August 2010, and against Celtic in September. On 15 February 2011, he joined First Division team Partick Thistle on a three-month loan deal and made his debut the same night. In all he made eight appearances before returning to Hearts at the start of April. After returning from his loan at Partick, McGowan made six more appearances for Hearts that season, with his first start for Hearts coming on 7 May 2011 against Rangers

On 23 July 2011, he started the 2011–12 season with a Sky Sports 'Man of the Match' performance against Rangers at Ibrox. He began to establish himself as a member of the first team and played in the Europa League qualifiers against Paks and in the second leg against Tottenham at White Hart Lane, where Hearts drew 0–0 (losing 5–0 on aggregate). McGowan scored his first goal for Hearts in an Edinburgh derby on 2 January. Later in the same game he headbutted Ivan Sproule in the stomach, which the referee viewed and took no action, however the SFA compliance officer opened an investigation. The compliance officer offered a two match ban. Hearts denied it was violent conduct but accepted the ban offered. The 2011–12 SPL season was a good one for McGowan, scoring 3 goals – including one in the 2012 Scottish Cup Final victory against Hibs – and winning the Hearts Young Player of the Year award.

Ahead of the last day of summer transfer window, Rangers made a bid for Hearts duo McGowan and David Templeton worth combined £1.3m valuation for the duo but the move rejected. Templeton went on to join Rangers but McGowan stayed, explaining that he needs to keep his international career status alive. On 2 January 2013, it was announced that Hearts had accepted a bid of around £400,000 from Chinese side Shandong Luneng Taishan. In all, McGowan made 73 appearances for the club.

=== Shandong Luneng Taishan ===
On 7 January 2013, McGowan signed a two-year contract with Chinese Super League side Shandong Luneng Taishan. He made his Chinese Super League debut for Shandong Luneng Taishan on 9 March 2013 against Dalian Aerbin. In his last match for Shandong, he scored the winning goal in the injury time against Jiangsu Sainty in the second leg of 2014 Chinese FA Cup final. However, Shandong Luneng decided not to extend his contract at the end of 2014 season.

=== Dundee United ===
On 23 January 2015, McGowan moved back to Scotland, signing an 18-month contract with Dundee United. He made his debut on 31 January 2015, as Dundee United beat Aberdeen 2–1 in the semi-final of the Scottish League Cup at Hampden Park.

=== Henan Jianye ===
McGowan returned to China on 21 January 2016 after he was transferred from Dundee United to Henan Jianye. The transfer fee was reported to be approximately £350,000. He made his debut by scoring an own goal as Shanghai SIPG beat Henan Jianye 5–0. On 27 January 2017, McGowan was released by Henan Jianye.

=== Guizhou Hengfeng Zhicheng ===
One month after leaving Henan Jianye, McGowan joined newly promoted Chinese Super League club Guizhou Hengfeng Zhicheng. On 3 March 2017, he made his debut for Guizhou in a 1–1 home draw against Liaoning FC.

=== Al-Sharjah ===
On 21 August 2017, McGowan joined UAE Arabian Gulf League side Al-Sharjah.

=== Bradford City ===
On 26 January 2018, Ryan joined EFL League One side Bradford City from Al-Sharjah for an undisclosed fee.

In January 2019 he was linked with a departure from the club, and a return to Scottish football with Dundee. Later that month he moved on loan to Dundee.

In May 2019, following Bradford City's relegation to League Two, it was announced that he would leave the club upon the expiry of his contract on 30 June 2019, one of 11 players to be released.

=== Sydney FC ===
On 3 July 2019, McGowan signed a two-year contract with A-League club Sydney FC, while his brother Dylan earlier joining their derby rivals Western Sydney Wanderers.

On 3 July 2021, Sydney FC announced that McGowan was leaving the club, having agreed to terms with an overseas club.

=== Kuwait SC ===
On 7 July 2021, McGowan signed with Kuwait Premier League club Kuwait SC.

=== St Johnstone ===
McGowan returned to Scottish football in July 2022, signing for St Johnstone. He would score his first goal for the Saintees on 24 May 2023, a last-minute equaliser against Ross County. After two seasons with the Saintees, the club confirmed on 3 July 2024 that McGowan had left the club after the expiry of his contract.

=== Livingston ===
In July 2024, McGowan signed for Scottish Championship club Livingston on a two-year deal. McGowan made his competitive debut for the Lions on 13 July in a victory over Forfar Athletic in the Scottish League Cup group stage. On 8 February 2025, McGowan scored his first goal for Livi in a Scottish Cup fifth round victory over Cove Rangers. On 30 March 2025, McGowan won the Scottish Challenge Cup with Livingston, playing the full game in a five-goal hammering over Queen's Park. In April 2025, McGowan was one of four Lions named as part of the 2024–25 PFA Scotland Championship Team of the Year. In total, McGowan played every minute in all 53 games of the season, and finished off in style by winning the Scottish Premiership play-offs to return the Lions to the Scottish Premiership.

== International career ==
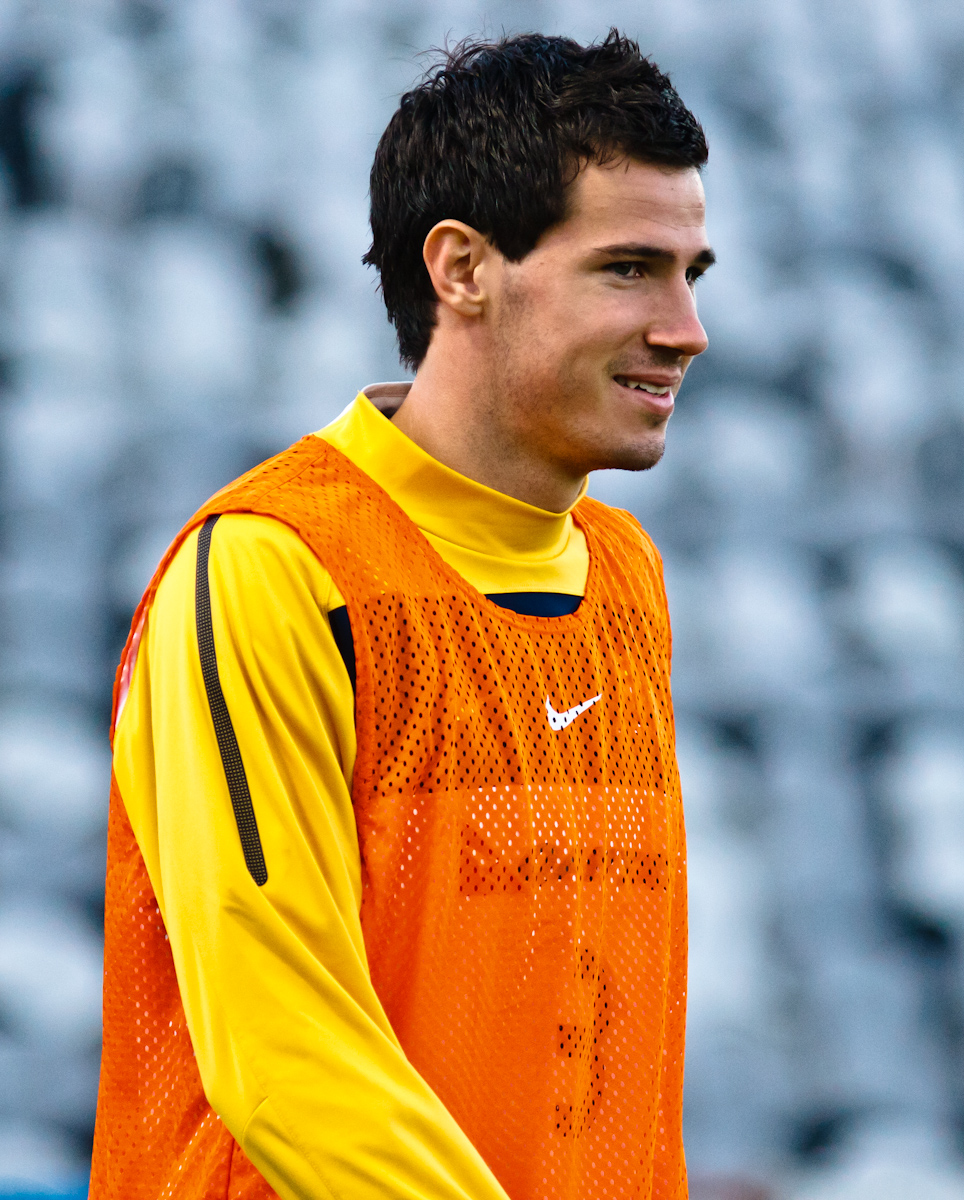
McGowan with Olyroos in 2011

McGowan was part of the Australia team that qualified for the AFC Youth Championship 2008 in November 2007. McGowan was selected for the 2009 FIFA U-20 World Cup in Egypt; his brother and teammate Dylan McGowan, was not selected.

McGowan started in the first match for the Young Socceroos in the 2009 FIFA U-20 World Cup, and received a yellow and a straight red against the Czech Republic for a studs up challenge which resulted in a penalty.

He received his first call-up to the Australia senior squad in August 2012, when he was selected for the friendly match against Scotland, making his debut as a late substitute replacing Sasa Ognenovski. McGowan was booed by some sections of the home support due to his Hearts connections, with the game being played at Easter Road.

He was named in Australia's 2014 FIFA World Cup squad and provided the assist to Tim Cahill's goal in Australia's 3–2 loss to the Netherlands.

== Family and personal life ==
His parents emigrated to Australia in 1980, and McGowan was born in Adelaide into a Scottish family from Glasgow. His brother Dylan currently plays for Hamilton Academical.

== Career statistics ==
=== Club ===
As of 4 September 2026

Appearances and goals by club, season and competition
Club	Season	League			National Cup		League Cup		Continental		Other		Total	
Club	Season	Division	Apps	Goals	Apps	Goals	Apps	Goals	Apps	Goals	Apps	Goals	Apps	Goals
Para Hills Knights	2006	South Australia Super League	10	1	2	0	—		—		—		12	1
Hearts	2007–08	Scottish Premier League	1	0	0	0	0	0	—		—		1	0
Hearts	2008–09	Scottish Premier League	0	0	0	0	0	0	—		—		0	0
Hearts	2010–11	Scottish Premier League	8	0	0	0	0	0	—		—		8	0
Hearts	2011–12	Scottish Premier League	28	2	6	1	1	0	3	0	—		38	3
Hearts	2012–13	Scottish Premier League	20	0	1	0	2	0	2	0	—		25	0
Hearts	Hearts total		57	2	7	1	3	0	5	0	0	0	72	3
Ayr United (loan)	2009–10	Scottish First Division	28	1	2	0	2	0	—		1 (Note: Appearance(s) in Scottish Challenge Cup)	0	33	1
Partick Thistle (loan)	2010–11	Scottish First Division	8	0	0	0	0	0	—		0	0	8	0
Shandong Luneng Taishan	2013	Chinese Super League	29	1	1	0	—		—		—		30	1
Shandong Luneng Taishan	2014	Chinese Super League	17	1	5	1	—		3	0	—		25	2
Shandong Luneng Taishan	Shandong total		46	2	6	1	0	0	3	0	0	0	55	3
Dundee United	2014–15	Scottish Premiership	12	1	3	0	2	0	—		—		17	1
Dundee United	2015–16	Scottish Premiership	22	0	0	0	2	0	—		—		24	0
Dundee United	Dundee United total		34	1	3	0	4	0	0	0	0	0	41	1
Henan Jianye	2016	Chinese Super League	28	2	2	0	—		—		—		30	2
Guizhou Hengfeng Zhicheng	2017	Chinese Super League	12	0	0	0	—		—		—		12	0
Al-Sharjah	2017–18	UAE Pro League	10	0	0	0	2	0	—		—		12	0
Bradford City	2017–18	League One	3	0	0	0	0	0	—		0	0	3	0
Bradford City	2018–19	League One	23	1	2	0	1	0	—		0	0	26	1
Bradford City	Bradford City total		26	1	2	0	1	0	0	0	0	0	29	1
Dundee	2018–19	Scottish Premiership	15	0	0	0	0	0	—		—		15	0
Sydney FC	2019–20	A-League	28	1	1	0	—		2	0	—		31	1
Sydney FC	2020–21	A-League	22	0	—		—		—		—		22	0
Sydney FC	Sydney total		50	1	1	0	0	0	2	0	0	0	53	1
Kuwait SC	2021–22	Kuwait Premier League	15	1	0	0	0	0	1	0	0	0	16	1
St Johnstone	2022–23	Scottish Premiership	28	1	0	0	1	0	—		0	0	29	1
St Johnstone	2023–24	Scottish Premiership	29	1	1	0	4	1	—		0	0	34	2
St Johnstone	St Johnstone total		57	2	1	0	5	1	0	0	0	0	63	3
Livingston	2024–25	Scottish Championship	36	0	4	1	4	0	—		9 (Note: Five appearances in the Scottish Challenge Cup, four appearances in the Scottish Premiership play-offs)	0	53	1
Livingston	2025–26	Scottish Premiership	22	0	1	0	5	0	—		0	0	28	0
Livingston	2026–27	Scottish Championship	4	0	0	0	1	0	—		0	0	5	0
Livingston	Livingston total		62	0	5	1	10	0	0	0	9	0	86	1
Career total			448	14	17	3	27	1	11	0	10	0	523	18

=== International ===
As of match played 3 June 2021

Australia
Year	Apps	Goals
2012	2	0
2013	6	0
2014	4	0
2015	2	0
2016	4	0
2017	2	0
2021	1	0
Total	21	0

== Honours ==
Hearts

- Scottish Cup: 2011–12

Shandong Luneng Taishan

- Chinese FA Cup: 2014

Sydney

- A-League Championship: 2019–20
- A-League Premiership: 2019–20

Livingston

- Scottish Challenge Cup: 2024–25
- Scottish Premiership play-offs: 2025

Australia U-20

- AFF U19 Youth Championship: 2008

Individual

- Chinese FA Cup Most Valuable Player: 2014
- PFA Scotland Team of the Year: 2024–25 Scottish Championship
