= Ellis Hudson =

English footballer

Personal information
- Full name: Ellis Luke Hudson
- Date of birth: 4 February 1999 (age 27)
- Place of birth: Bradford, England
- Height: 5 ft 8 in (1.73 m)
- Position: Left winger

Team information
- Current team: Silsden

Youth career
- 2007–2016: Bradford City

College career
Years	Team	Apps	(Gls)
2019–2021	Florida Tech Panthers		

Senior career*
Years	Team	Apps	(Gls)
2016–2018	Bradford City	1	(0)
2017	→ Harrogate Town (loan)	2	(0)
2018	→ Guiseley (loan)	2	(1)
2022	Bingley Town		
2022–	Silsden		
- * Club domestic league appearances and goals as of 18:56, 13 December 2022 (UTC)

Ellis Luke Hudson (born 4 February 1999) is an English professional footballer who plays for Silsden, as a left winger.

== Early and personal life ==
Born in Bradford, Hudson attended Bingley Grammar School.

== Career ==
Hudson joined Bradford City at the age of 8. He made his senior debut on 30 August 2016, in an EFL Trophy game against Stoke under-23s. He turned professional in September 2016, signing a two-year contract. Hudson joined Harrogate Town on loan in November 2017, alongside teammate Lachlan Barr. He then moved on loan to Guiseley in March 2018.

He was offered a new contract by Bradford City at the end of the 2017–18 season. He left the club in December 2018 by mutual consent.

He moved to the United States to play college soccer for the Florida Tech Panthers.

He joined Silsden in September 2022 after a spell at Bingley Town.

== Career statistics ==
As of 19 December 2018

Appearances and goals by club, season and competition
Club	Season	League			FA Cup		League Cup		Other		Total	
Club	Season	Division	Apps	Goals	Apps	Goals	Apps	Goals	Apps	Goals	Apps	Goals
Bradford City	2016–17	League One	1	0	0	0	0	0	3 (Note: Appearances in the EFL Trophy)	0	4	0
Bradford City	2017–18	League One	0	0	0	0	0	0	2	0	2	0
Bradford City	2018–19	League One	0	0	0	0	0	0	0	0	0	0
Bradford City	Bradford City total		1	0	0	0	0	0	5	0	6	0
Harrogate Town (loan)	2017–18	National League North	2	0	0	0	—		1 (Note: Appearance in the FA Trophy)	0	3	0
Guiseley (loan)	2017–18	National League	2	1	0	0	—		0	0	2	1
Career total			5	1	0	0	0	0	6	0	11	1
