= Alex Laird =

English footballer

Personal information
- Date of birth: 21 April 1999 (age 27)
- Position: Central defender

Team information
- Current team: Silsden

Youth career
- Bradford City

Senior career*
| Years | Team | Apps | (Gls) |
| 2017–2018 | Bradford City | 0 | (0) |
| 2018–2019 | Albion Sports | | |
| 2019–2020 | Bradford (Park Avenue) | | |
| 2020–2022 | Eccleshill United | | |
| 2022– | Silsden | | |
- * Club domestic league appearances and goals as of 09:20, 13 June 2019 (UTC)

Alex Laird (born 21 April 1999) is an English footballer who plays for Silsden, as a central defender.

== Career ==
Laird signed a one-year professional contract with Bradford City in April 2017, and made his senior debut on 24 October 2017, in a Football League Trophy game.

He was released by Bradford City at the end of the 2017–18 season.

After playing with Albion Sports, he signed for Bradford (Park Avenue) in June 2019.

He joined Silsden from Eccleshill United in July 2022.

== Career statistics ==
As of 30 June 2018

Appearances and goals by club, season and competition
| Club | Season | League | | | FA Cup | | League Cup | | Other | | Total | |
| Club | Season | Division | Apps | Goals | Apps | Goals | Apps | Goals | Apps | Goals | Apps | Goals |
|---|---|---|---|---|---|---|---|---|---|---|---|---|
| Bradford City | 2017–18 | League One | 0 | 0 | 0 | 0 | 0 | 0 | 2 (Note: Appearances in the EFL Trophy.) | 0 | 2 | 0 |
| Career total | | | 0 | 0 | 0 | 0 | 0 | 0 | 2 | 0 | 2 | 0 |
