= Lukas Raeder =

German footballer

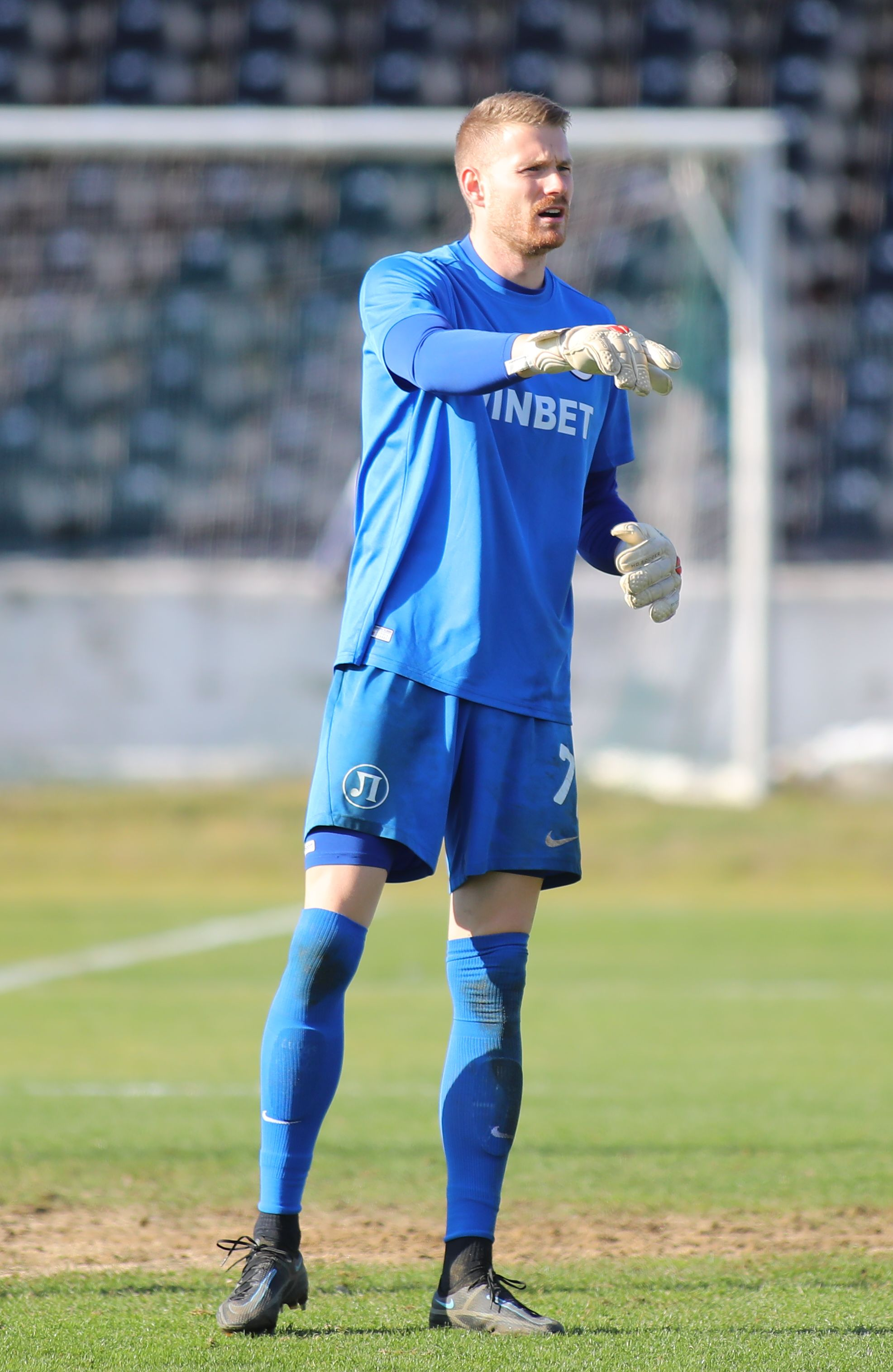
- Raeder with Lokomotiv Plovdiv in 2022

Personal information
- Full name: Lukas Raeder
- Date of birth: 30 December 1993 (age 32)
- Place of birth: Essen, Germany
- Height: 1.94 m (6 ft 4 in)
- Position: Goalkeeper

Youth career
- 1999–2001: Essener SV
- 2001–2004: ESC Rellinghausen 06
- 2004–2007: MSV Duisburg
- 2007–2010: Rot-Weiss Essen
- 2010–2012: Schalke 04

Senior career*
| Years | Team | Apps | (Gls) |
| 2012–2014 | Bayern Munich II | 37 | (0) |
| 2012–2014 | Bayern Munich | 2 | (0) |
| 2014–2017 | Vitória Setúbal | 27 | (0) |
| 2017–2018 | Bradford City | 1 | (0) |
| 2018–2019 | Rot-Weiss Essen | 19 | (0) |
| 2019–2021 | VfB Lübeck | 59 | (0) |
| 2021–2022 | Lokomotiv Plovdiv | 18 | (0) |
| 2022–2023 | MSV Duisburg | 2 | (0) |
| Total | | 165 | (0) |
- * Club domestic league appearances and goals

Lukas Raeder (born 30 December 1993) is a German former professional footballer who played as a goalkeeper.

== Career ==
=== Early career ===
Raeder was at Essener SV, ESC Rellinghausen 06, MSV Duisburg, Rot-Weiss Essen, and Schalke 04 during his youth team career.

=== Bayern Munich ===
Raeder joined Bayern Munich in 2012 from Schalke 04. He made his Bundesliga debut at 12 April 2014 in a 3–0 home defeat against Borussia Dortmund. He replaced Manuel Neuer at half-time. He conceded two goals. He then started in the DFB-Pokal semi-final against 1. FC Kaiserslautern, which his team won 5–1.

=== Vitória Setúbal ===
On 7 July 2014, Raeder signed for Portuguese club Vitória Setúbal on a three-year contract.

=== Bradford City ===
He joined Bradford City on a short-term deal on 31 August 2017. He was released by Bradford City at the end of the 2017–18 season.

=== Lokomotiv Plovdiv ===
In July 2021, Raeder signed a two-year contract with Bulgarian club Lokomotiv Plovdiv.

=== MSV Duisburg ===
In 2022, Raeder returned to Germany and signed for MSV Duisburg. After one season, he left Duisburg.

In November 2023, having been without a club since the summer, Raeder announced his retirement from playing.

== Career statistics ==
Appearances and goals by club, season and competition
| Club | Season | League | | | National cup | | League cup | | Continental | | Other | | Total | | Ref. |
| Club | Season | League | Apps | Goals | Apps | Goals | Apps | Goals | Apps | Goals | Apps | Goals | Apps | Goals | Ref. |
|---|---|---|---|---|---|---|---|---|---|---|---|---|---|---|---|
| Bayern Munich II | 2012–13 | Regionalliga Bayern | 19 | 0 | — | | — | | — | | — | | 19 | 0 | |
| Bayern Munich II | 2013–14 | Regionalliga Bayern | 18 | 0 | — | | — | | — | | 2 | 0 | 20 | 0 | |
| Bayern Munich II | Total | | 37 | 0 | — | | — | | — | | 2 | 0 | 39 | 0 | — |
| Bayern Munich | 2013–14 | Bundesliga | 2 | 0 | 1 | 0 | — | | 0 | 0 | 0 | 0 | 3 | 0 | |
| Vitória Setúbal | 2014–15 | Primeira Liga | 17 | 0 | 0 | 0 | 1 | 0 | — | | — | | 18 | 0 | |
| Vitória Setúbal | 2015–16 | Primeira Liga | 10 | 0 | 0 | 0 | 0 | 0 | — | | — | | 10 | 0 | |
| Vitória Setúbal | 2016–17 | Primeira Liga | 0 | 0 | 0 | 0 | 0 | 0 | — | | — | | 0 | 0 | |
| Vitória Setúbal | Total | | 27 | 0 | 0 | 0 | 1 | 0 | — | | — | | 28 | 0 | — |
| Bradford City | 2017–18 | League One | 1 | 0 | 1 | 0 | — | | 0 | 0 | 0 | 0 | 2 | 0 | |
| Rot-Weiss Essen | 2018–19 | Regionalliga West | 19 | 0 | 0 | 0 | — | | 0 | 0 | 0 | 0 | 19 | 0 | |
| VfB Lübeck | 2019–20 | Regionalliga Nord | 22 | 0 | 1 | 0 | — | | — | | — | | 18 | 0 | |
| VfB Lübeck | 2020–21 | 3. Liga | 37 | 0 | 0 | 0 | — | | — | | — | | 37 | 0 | |
| VfB Lübeck | Total | | 59 | 0 | 1 | 0 | — | | — | | — | | 60 | 0 | — |
| Lokomotiv Plovdiv | 2021–22 | First League | 18 | 0 | 2 | 0 | — | | 0 | 0 | 0 | 0 | 20 | 0 | |
| MSV Duisburg | 2022–23 | 3. Liga | 2 | 0 | — | | — | | — | | — | | 2 | 0 | |
| Career total | | | 165 | 0 | 5 | 0 | 1 | 0 | 0 | 0 | 2 | 0 | 173 | 0 | — |

== Honours ==
Bayern Munich

- Bundesliga: 2013–14
- DFB-Pokal: 2013–14
- FIFA Club World Cup: 2013
