= Lachlan Barr =

Australian professional footballer

Personal information
- Full name: Lachlan Ryan Barr
- Date of birth: 24 September 1994 (age 32)
- Place of birth: Adelaide, Australia
- Height: 1.89 m (6 ft 2 1/2 in)
- Position: Central defender

Team information
- Current team: MetroStars

Youth career
- Westlands United
- 2013–2014: Adelaide United

Senior career*
Years	Team	Apps	(Gls)
2012	Westlands United		
2013–2015	White City	46	(3)
2016–2017	Internationale Berlin	24	(1)
2017–2018	Bradford City	1	(0)
2017	→ Harrogate Town (loan)	0	(0)
2018–2019	MetroStars	39	(6)
2020	Heidelberg United	5	(1)
2020–2021	Adelaide City	37	(3)
2021–2024	Adelaide United	35	(3)
2024–2025	Perth Glory	7	(0)
2025–	MetroStars	0	(0)
- * Club domestic league appearances and goals as of 9 July 2025

Lachlan Ryan Barr (born 24 September 1994) is an Australian professional soccer player who plays as a central defender for MetroStars.

== Early and personal life ==
Barr was born in Adelaide, Australia.

== Career ==
Barr played youth football for Westland United and Adelaide United. He played senior football for White City in the 2013, 2014 and 2015 seasons. After a spell in Germany with Internationale Berlin, which he combined with working in an ice cream parlour, he moved to English club Bradford City in July 2017.

Barr joined Harrogate Town on loan in November 2017, alongside teammate Ellis Hudson. He scored on his debut for the club, in the FA Trophy, but did not make a league appearance for them.

Upon his return to Australia, Lachlan signed for MetroStars in the FFSA NPL, where he won the club's Player of the Year award in his first season. He moved to Heidelberg United for the 2020 season. He signed for Adelaide City in August 2020.

He moved to Adelaide United in December 2021. On 9 June 2022 he signed a two-year deal with the club transitioning from an injury replacement contract. He left the club at the end of the 2023–24 season.

On 5 July 2024, Perth Glory announced the signing of Barr ahead of the 2024–25 season.

After departing Perth Glory in May 2025, in July 2025, Barr returned to MetroStars.
