= Tyrell Robinson =

English footballer

Personal information
- Date of birth: 16 September 1997 (age 29)
- Place of birth: Basildon, England
- Positions: Left back; left winger

Youth career
- 2004–2017: Arsenal

Senior career*
Years	Team	Apps	(Gls)
2017–2020	Bradford City	23	(3)
- * Club domestic league appearances and goals as of 13:38, 24 February 2020 (UTC)

Tyrell Robinson (born 16 September 1997) is an English former professional footballer who played as a left back and left winger. In 2020, he was convicted of child sex offences.

== Career ==
=== Early career ===
Born in Basildon, Robinson played youth football with Arsenal, joining in 2004, at the age of seven. He turned professional in January 2015, and was released by the club in February 2017. He had a trial with Watford in April 2017.

=== Bradford City ===
He signed a one-year contract with Bradford City in May 2017. He made his senior debut on 21 October 2017, appearing as a substitute in a league match; this was followed three days later by a start in an EFL Trophy game. He scored his first goal for the club on 18 November 2017, and was praised by manager Stuart McCall. In January 2018 he signed a new contract with the club until summer 2020. Later that month he stated that the new contract would not impact on his form. At the end of his first season as a professional, where he scored 3 goals in 26 appearances in all competitions, he was named Bradford City's 'Supporters' Trust Under 23s Player of the Year'. He also commented that his football was still developing.

==== Suspension and criminal conviction ====
On 15 August 2018, ten minutes before kick-off of an EFL Cup game against Macclesfield Town, Robinson was removed from the locker room for questioning by police. He was suspended by the club the next day, and then arrested on suspicion of sexual assault. He was sacked by Bradford City on 24 February 2020 due to gross misconduct, after police announced charges against him.

At Bradford Crown Court on 16 June, Robinson pleaded guilty to sex offences involving a 14-year-old girl. His co-accused changed his plea from not guilty to guilty. On 26 January 2021, Robinson began his prison sentence of three and a half years.

== Playing style ==
In May 2017 Robinson was described by Bradford City Head of Recruitment Greg Abbott as having "bags of pace" and being "a strong, athletic kid with a great desire to prove everybody wrong". Primarily a left winger, Robinson was also occasionally used by Bradford City manager Stuart McCall as a left back.

== Career statistics ==
As of 24 February 2020

Appearances and goals by club, season and competition
Club	Season	League			FA Cup		League Cup		Other		Total	
Club	Season	Division	Apps	Goals	Apps	Goals	Apps	Goals	Apps	Goals	Apps	Goals
Bradford City	2017–18	League One	21	3	3	0	0	0	2 (Note: Appearances in the EFL Trophy.)	0	26	3
Bradford City	2018–19	League One	2	0	0	0	0	0	0	0	2	0
Bradford City	2019–20	League Two	0	0	0	0	0	0	0	0	0	0
Career total			23	3	3	0	0	0	2	0	28	3
