= Alex Jones (footballer, born 1994) =

English footballer (born 1994)

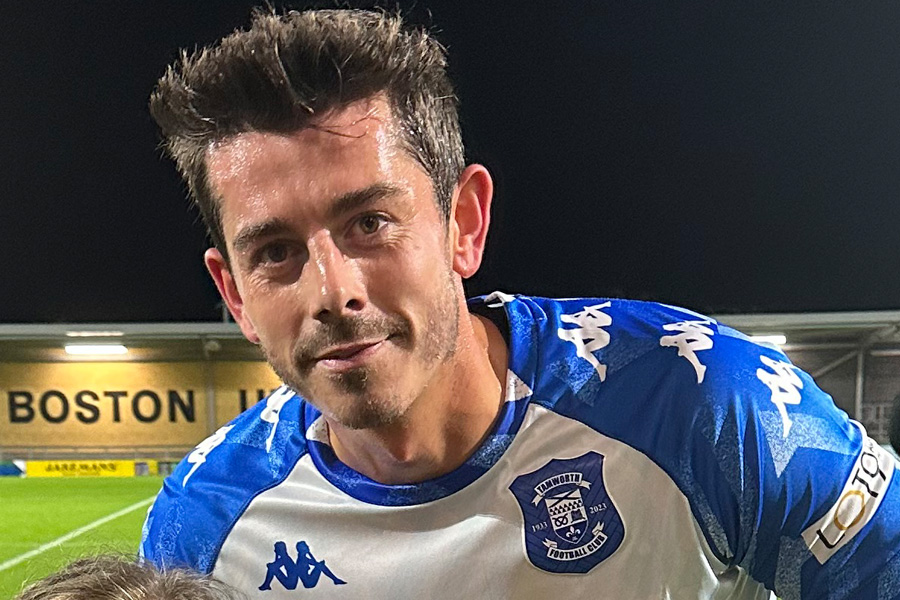
- Jones in November 2021

Personal information
- Full name: Alexander Richard Jones
- Date of birth: 28 September 1994 (age 32)
- Place of birth: Sutton Coldfield, England
- Height: 1.85 m (6 ft 1 in)
- Position: Forward

Youth career
- 2006–2014: West Bromwich Albion

Senior career*
Years	Team	Apps	(Gls)
2014–2015	West Bromwich Albion	0	(0)
2015–2017	Birmingham City	0	(0)
2015	→ Grimsby Town (loan)	4	(0)
2016–2017	→ Port Vale (loan)	19	(9)
2017–2019	Bradford City	24	(5)
2019	→ Cambridge United (loan)	12	(1)
2019–2020	Partick Thistle	12	(2)
2021	Northampton Town	9	(1)
2021–2024	Tamworth	40	(5)
2024	→ Stourbridge (loan)	6	(3)
2024–2025	Stourbridge	23	(2)
- * Club domestic league appearances and goals as of 09:59, 15 May 2025 (UTC)

Alexander Richard Jones (born 28 September 1994) is an English footballer who plays as a striker.

Jones began his career with West Bromwich Albion; in 2015, he spent time with Grimsby Town of the National League. A loan move to A-League club Wellington Phoenix in 2016 fell through because of an administrative error by New Zealand Football. He joined Port Vale on a five-month loan deal in August 2016 and signed a two-and-a-half-year contract with Bradford City the following January. He left Bradford in 2019, following a loan spell at Cambridge United. He spent the 2019–20 season with Scottish club Partick Thistle and later signed with Northampton Town in March 2021. He joined Tamworth in November 2021 and helped the club to the Southern League Premier Division Central title at the end of the 2022–23 season. Tamworth won the National League North title the following season, though Jones spent some of the campaign away on loan at Stourbridge. He joined Stourbridge permanently in June 2024.

== Career ==
=== West Bromwich Albion ===
Jones was born in Sutton Coldfield, and began his football career as a youngster with West Bromwich Albion at the age of 12. He was a member of the team that won the UK finals of the Nike Premier Cup in 2009, and took up a two-year scholarship in 2011. When his initial scholarship ended in 2013, he was given a third year. During the 2013–14 season he helped the club's reserve team win the Birmingham Senior Cup, and in May 2015 he signed his first professional contract, of one year with the option of a second. Jones sustained an injury during a pre-season friendly that kept him out for three months; he scored twice on his return to the under-21 team, and came up with another two goals in his next three matches. Nevertheless, the club decided not to take up the option on his contract – which came as a shock to the player – and in the latter part of the season he had trials with Walsall and Birmingham City.

=== Birmingham City ===
After appearing in two under-21 matches as part of his trial, the Championship club were sufficiently impressed to offer Jones a two-year contract, which he accepted. He played regularly for the club's under-21 team in the 2015–16 season, and in November, he joined National League club Grimsby Town on a month's loan to gain experience of senior football. Although only meeting the team on the way to the match, he came on as a late substitute and set up a goal for Pádraig Amond as Grimsby won 3–0 away to Barrow. Jones made six appearances during the month; although he did not score, his contribution to the team was such that Grimsby wanted to keep him on, but Birmingham were not prepared to extend the loan.

West Bromwich Albion's goalkeeping coach Jonathan Gould, who formerly coached at Wellington Phoenix, had recommended Jones to the New Zealand-based A-League club before his move to Birmingham, but at the time they had no vacancy for a foreign player. In January 2016, they renewed their interest, and Jones signed on loan to the end of the 2015–16 season. Birmingham's development coach Richard Beale said the player would benefit from playing regular senior football, and that he deserved his chance because of his professionalism and positive attitude despite not being able to force his way into Birmingham's first-team. The move fell through when New Zealand Football failed to forward the completed paperwork to FIFA before the transfer deadline despite having received it from the Phoenix three days previously. An appeal to the world governing body was unsuccessful, as FIFA "ruled to protect the integrity of their global deadlines for the transfer of players". He remained with Birmingham and was a member of the reserve team that lost the 2016 Birmingham Senior Cup final to National League North champions Solihull Moors.

==== Port Vale (loan) ====
Jones joined League One club Port Vale on a five-month loan deal in August 2016. He remained eligible to play in non-first-team fixtures for Birmingham City during the loan spell. He made his Football League debut at Vale Park on 16 August, as an 84th-minute substitute for Anton Forrester in a 1–0 win over Rochdale; he won a penalty within two minutes of coming onto the field, though JJ Hooper missed the ensuing penalty. Jones also had a shot blocked by the last defender after running past goalkeeper Josh Lillis deep into stoppage time. On 27 August, he scored twice to help the "Valiants" record a 3–1 victory over Scunthorpe United despite being played at wide right of the front three. Manager Bruno Ribeiro praised him after the match. His performance won him a place on the Football League Paper's League One Team of the Day. He was nominated for the League One Player of the Month award for August and September after scoring six goals in eight games. By the end of his loan spell, Jones had scored ten goals from 21 matches. Port Vale had hoped to convert the loan to a permanent deal and, according to club chairman Norman Smurthwaite, had agreed on a fee with Birmingham but were unable to agree on terms with the player's agent.

=== Bradford City ===
On 5 January 2017, Jones signed for another League One club, Bradford City, on a two-and-a-half-year deal for an undisclosed fee. After spending five weeks out with a hip injury, he recorded his first goal for Bradford after coming on as a substitute to score the winning goal in a 2–1 victory over former club Port Vale at Vale Park on 25 February. He scored five goals in 15 league games for the "Bantams" in the second half of the 2016–17 season, and also appeared as a 74th-minute substitute for Billy Clarke in the play-off final defeat to Millwall at Wembley Stadium.

Jones opened the 2017–18 campaign with five goals in 11 games before damaging his ankle in a 1–0 defeat to Plymouth Argyle at Valley Parade on 11 November; he was forced to undergo surgery and was subsequently ruled out of action for four months. He went on to miss almost an entire year with injuries, during which time the club cycled through three managers after Stuart McCall's departure, and Jones admitted that he had hardly even spoke to Simon Grayson, McCall's initial replacement. Finding himself out of then-incumbent David Hopkin's first-team plans, on 25 January 2019, Jones moved to League Two club Cambridge United on loan for the remainder of the 2018–19 season. He stated that his aim at the Abbey Stadium was simply "to gain plenty of match minutes under the belt". In May 2019, following Bradford City's relegation to League Two, it was announced that he would leave the club upon the expiry of his contract on 30 June 2019, one of 11 players to be released.

=== Partick Thistle ===
On 13 July 2019, Jones signed a one-year deal with Scottish Championship club Partick Thistle, becoming "Jags" manager Gary Caldwell's eighth summer signing. After three months out injured Jones returned to the Thistle team to start in a 2–1 win over Queen of the South on 7 December. The following week he scored his first goal for the club in a 3–1 win over Inverness Caledonian Thistle. He scored two goals in 17 games in the 2019–20 season, which ended in relegation when the season was declared early with nine games left to play due to the COVID-19 pandemic in Scotland. Jones left Thistle at the expiry of his contract in July 2020.

=== Northampton Town ===
On 2 March 2021, Jones joined Northampton Town until the end of the 2020–21 season. He made his debut for the club seven days later and scored his side's only goal of the game in the 93rd-minute after entering the game as a substitute in a 2–1 defeat away at Charlton Athletic. The "Cobblers" were relegated out of League One at the end of the season and though his contract was due to expire in the summer it was reported that he had been invited to train with the club by manager Jon Brady. However, he declined the invitation.

=== Tamworth ===
On 2 November 2021, Jones was announced as a signing for Southern League Premier Division Central side Tamworth. Jones made his debut four days later away at Barwell, coming on in as a substitute on the 60th-minute for Michael Taylor; Tamworth won the match 1–0. He made a further seven appearances in the 2021–22 campaign. Tamworth produced a newsletter on 17 June 2022, which confirmed that Jones was in fact on a contract that would see him remain with the club for the 2022–23 season.

Jones returned to action for Tamworth after coming on as a 75th-minute substitute for Alex Bradley in a 1–1 draw at home with Ilkeston Town on 6 August 2022. On 20 August, he scored his first goal for Tamworth by converting a penalty he had won in an 8–1 victory at Bedford Town. He ended the 2022–23 campaign with seven goals from 24 games as Tamworth won promotion as champions of the Premier Division Central.

After illness and injury disrupted the first half of his 2023–24 season, Jones joined Southern League Premier Division Central club Stourbridge in January 2024 on a month's loan. On his debut, he scored the match's only goal to beat Alvechurch in stoppage time. He returned to Tamworth, who went on to be crowned as National League North champions.

=== Stourbridge ===
On 6 June 2024, Jones signed permanently for Stourbridge. Not long after signing, he was named the club captain for the upcoming season. He scored two goals in 24 games in the 2024–25 campaign.

== Career statistics ==
As of end of 2024–25 season

Appearances and goals by club, season and competition
Club	Season	League			National Cup (Note: Includes FA Cup, Scottish Cup)		League Cup (Note: Includes EFL Cup, Scottish League Cup)		Other		Total	
Club	Season	Division	Apps	Goals	Apps	Goals	Apps	Goals	Apps	Goals	Apps	Goals
Birmingham City	2015–16	Championship	0	0	—		0	0	—		0	0
Birmingham City	2016–17	Championship	0	0	—		0	0	—		0	0
Birmingham City	Total		0	0	—		0	0	—		0	0
Grimsby Town (loan)	2015–16	National League	4	0	1	0	—		1 (Note: Appearance in FA Trophy)	0	6	0
Port Vale (loan)	2016–17	League One	19	9	1	1	0	0	1 (Note: Appearances in EFL Trophy)	0	21	10
Bradford City	2016–17	League One	15	5	—		—		1 (Note: Appearance in League One play-offs)	0	16	5
Bradford City	2017–18	League One	7	0	1	1	1	1	2	3	11	5
Bradford City	2018–19	League One	2	0	0	0	0	0	1	0	3	0
Bradford City	Total		24	5	1	1	1	1	4	3	30	10
Cambridge United	2018–19	League Two	12	1	—		—		—		12	1
Partick Thistle	2019–20	Scottish Championship	12	2	0	0	4	0	1 (Note: Appearance in Scottish Challenge Cup)	0	17	2
Northampton Town	2020–21	League One	9	1	—		—		—		9	1
Tamworth	2021–22	Southern League Premier Division Central	7	0	0	0	—		1	0	8	0
Tamworth	2022–23	Southern League Premier Division Central	20	5	2	2	—		2	0	24	7
Tamworth	2023–24	National League North	13	0	1	0	—		0	0	14	0
Tamworth	Total		40	5	3	2	0	0	3	0	46	7
Stourbridge (loan)	2023–24	Southern League Premier Division Central	6	3	—		—		—		6	3
Stourbridge	2024–25	Southern League Premier Division Central	23	2	0	0	—		1 (Note: Appearance in Walsall Senior Cup)	0	24	2
Stourbridge	Total		29	5	0	0	—		1	0	30	5
Career total			149	28	6	4	5	1	11	3	171	36

== Honours ==
Tamworth

- Southern League Premier Division Central: 2022–23
- National League North: 2023–24
