= Charlie Wyke =

English footballer (born 1992)

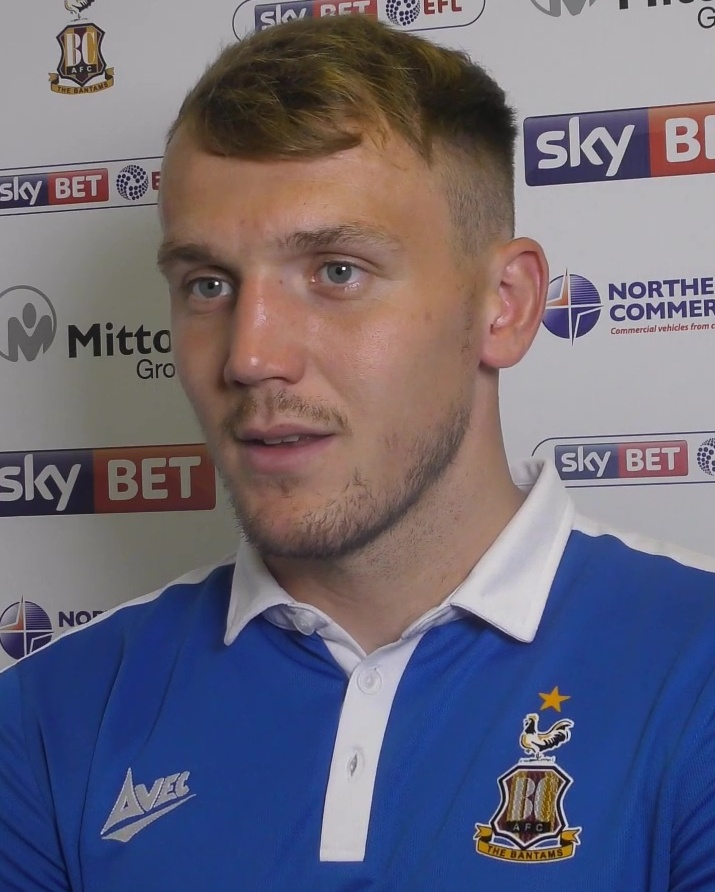
- Wyke with Bradford in 2017

Personal information
- Full name: Charles Thomas Wyke
- Date of birth: 6 December 1992 (age 33)
- Place of birth: Middlesbrough, England
- Height: 6 ft 2 in (1.88 m)
- Position: Striker

Youth career
- 1997–2011: Middlesbrough

Senior career*
Years	Team	Apps	(Gls)
2011–2015	Middlesbrough	0	(0)
2012	→ Kettering Town (loan)	12	(2)
2012–2013	→ Hartlepool United (loan)	25	(2)
2014	→ AFC Wimbledon (loan)	17	(2)
2014	→ Hartlepool United (loan)	13	(4)
2015–2017	Carlisle United	77	(32)
2017–2018	Bradford City	56	(22)
2018–2021	Sunderland	94	(34)
2021–2024	Wigan Athletic	51	(14)
2024	→ Rotherham United (loan)	12	(1)
2024–2026	Carlisle United	21	(2)
Total		378	(115)
- * Club domestic league appearances and goals as of 13:37, 7 June 2026 (UTC)

Charles Thomas Wyke (born 6 December 1992) is a former English professional footballer who played as a forward.

== Career ==
=== Middlesbrough ===
Wyke started his career in the academy at Middlesbrough and progressed through the system. After scoring close to 30 goals in the 2010–11 season in all competitions, he was rewarded with a three-year contract in May 2011.

==== Loan spells ====
In March 2012, Wyke joined Football Conference side Kettering Town on a youth loan.

In October 2012, Wyke joined Football League One side Hartlepool United in a one-month loan deal. He made his professional debut on 9 October, in a Football League Trophy defeat to Bradford City on penalties where he scored in the shoot-out. After impressing for Pools, Wyke had his loan deal extended until the end of the season with boss John Hughes saying "I'm really pleased that we've been able to get things sorted because Charlie has done well in his time with us".

He then joined up with League Two side AFC Wimbledon on a months loan in January 2014, before having his deal extended by a further 3 months. He made 17 appearances for the Dons, netting two goals.

Wyke rejoined Hartlepool United on a one-month loan on 21 August 2014. The deal was later extended keeping him at Victoria Park until the end of November. He made 14 appearances in this second spell, scoring four times.

=== Carlisle United ===
On 23 January 2015, Wyke signed for League Two side Carlisle United on an 18-month contract for an undisclosed fee following a successful spell at fellow League Two side Hartlepool, in which he netted 4 goals in 13 league appearances.

He scored his first goal in a Carlisle shirt on his full-home debut against fellow strugglers Mansfield Town, picking up an assist along the way in a 2–1 victory. Wyke followed up his impressive home-debut by netting a brace away at fellow strugglers Tranmere Rovers in a 2–0 victory. Wyke then followed up his impressive brace with his fourth goal in three starts against high-flyers Shrewsbury Town. During his first season at the club in 2015–16, he scored 15 goals in 38 appearances in all competitions.

On 28 January 2017, Wyke who had been in prolific form in the continuing season, scored his 18th goal of the 2016–17 season for Carlisle United against Barnet.

=== Bradford City ===
Wyke signed for Bradford City for an undisclosed fee on transfer deadline day, 31 January 2017, alongside Jacob Hanson, Kevin Toner and Matthew Penney. Wyke took just 15 minutes to score on his debut for the club, scoring in a 2–2 draw at home to Gillingham four days later. He then scored a brace in another 2–2 draw later that month, this time at home to play-off rivals Bolton Wanderers.

=== Sunderland ===
For circa £400,000, Wyke signed for Sunderland on 1 August 2018. Due to a minor injury, his first goal for the club came exactly one month later when he was brought on as a substitute during a league game against Oxford United on 1 September 2018. After disappointing seasons in 2018–19 and 2019–20, where he combined for only 9 goals in 51 total league appearances, he became the centerpiece of the Sunderland attack in the 2020–21 season. He scored his first goal of the campaign in a 2–0 win over Swindon Town on 17 October. He had his first multi-goal match of the season in the league on 12 December with two goals in a 4–0 win over Lincoln City. His form only improved as he scored 15 times in 15 league matches between 2 January and 6 March, during which he crossed the 20 goal mark in the league. In Sunderland's EFL Trophy run, he scored five goals in six appearances, not only putting himself in a tie as top goalscorer for the competition but also helping lead the club to the final.

Following an impressive season, Wyke was named in the 2020–21 EFL League One Team of the Season at the league's annual awards ceremony. On 18 May 2021, he was named Sunderland Player of the Year.

=== Wigan Athletic ===
On 7 July 2021, Wigan Athletic completed the signing of Wyke on a three-year deal. He scored his first goals for Wigan when he scored twice in a 4–1 win at Accrington Stanley on 18 September 2021. In November 2021, Wyke collapsed in training during the build-up to a League One fixture with Cambridge United. On 25 November, two days after the match, the club issued a statement that Wyke was in a stable condition in hospital where he would continue to be monitored.

Following an impressive start to the 2023–24 season that saw him score five goals in as many matches, Wyke won the EFL League One Player of the Month award for August 2023.

==== Rotherham United loan ====
Wyke joined Rotherham United on loan until the end of the season, on transfer deadline day, 1 February 2024.

On 10 May 2024, Wigan said he would be released in the summer when his contract expired.

=== Carlisle United ===
On 1 July 2024, Wyke returned to League Two club Carlisle United on a two-year deal.

On 26 October 2024, Wyke suffered an ankle injury that would require surgery in a 1–0 defeat to Cheltenham Town, ruling him out for the remainder of the season. On 9 May 2026, the club announced it would be releasing the player. On 27 July 2026, Wyke announced his retirement from football.

== Career statistics ==
As of match played 25 April 2026

Appearances and goals by club, season and competition
Club	Season	League			FA Cup		League Cup		Other		Total	
Club	Season	Division	Apps	Goals	Apps	Goals	Apps	Goals	Apps	Goals	Apps	Goals
Kettering Town (loan)	2011–12	Conference Premier	12	2	0	0	—		0	0	12	2
Hartlepool United (loan)	2012–13	League One	25	2	0	0	0	0	1 (Note: Appearance(s) in EFL Trophy)	0	26	2
AFC Wimbledon (loan)	2013–14	League Two	17	2	0	0	0	0	0	0	17	2
Hartlepool United (loan)	2014–15	League Two	13	4	0	0	0	0	1	0	14	4
Carlisle United	2014–15	League Two	17	6	0	0	0	0	0	0	17	6
Carlisle United	2015–16	League Two	34	12	3	3	1	0	0	0	38	15
Carlisle United	2016–17	League Two	26	14	2	0	2	1	4	3	34	18
Carlisle United	Total		77	32	5	3	3	1	4	3	89	39
Bradford City	2016–17	League One	16	7	0	0	0	0	3 (Note: Appearances in the League One play-offs)	0	19	7
Bradford City	2017–18	League One	40	15	3	1	0	0	0	0	43	16
Bradford City	Total		56	22	3	1	0	0	3	0	62	23
Sunderland	2018–19	League One	24	4	0	0	0	0	6 (Note: Three appearances in the EFL Trophy, three appearances in the League One play-offs)	1	30	5
Sunderland	2019–20	League One	27	5	0	0	3	1	0	0	30	6
Sunderland	2020–21	League One	43	25	1	0	1	0	9 (Note: Seven appearances in the EFL Trophy, two appearances in the League One play-offs)	6	54	31
Sunderland	Total		94	34	1	0	4	1	15	7	114	42
Wigan Athletic	2021–22	League One	15	5	2	0	0	0	0	0	17	5
Wigan Athletic	2022–23	Championship	18	2	0	0	0	0	0	0	18	2
Wigan Athletic	2023–24	League One	18	7	0	0	1	0	3	1	24	8
Wigan Athletic	Total		51	14	2	0	1	0	3	1	57	16
Rotherham United (loan)	2023–24	Championship	12	1	—		—		—		12	1
Carlisle United	2024–25	League Two	13	2	0	0	1	0	0	0	14	2
Carlisle United	2025–26	National League	8	0	0	0	0	0	0	0	8	0
Carlisle United	Total		21	2	0	0	1	0	0	0	22	2
Career total			378	115	11	4	9	2	27	11	425	132

== Honours ==
Sunderland

- EFL Trophy: 2020–21; runner-up: 2018–19

Wigan Athletic

- EFL League One: 2021–22

Individual

- PFA Team of the Year: 2020–21 League One
- EFL League One Team of the Season: 2020–21
- Sunderland Player of the Year: 2020–21
- EFL League One Player of the Month: August 2023
