= 2023–24 Wisła Kraków season =

Wisła Kraków 2023–24 football season

Wisła Kraków
2023–24 season
- Chairman: Jarosław Królewski
- Manager(s): Radosław Sobolewski (until 2 December 2023); Mariusz Jop (interim, 3−29 December 2023); Albert Rudé (since 29 December 2023)
- I liga: 10th
- Polish Cup: Winners
- Top goalscorer: League: Ángel Rodado (22); All: Ángel Rodado (26)
- Highest home attendance: 33,000 (vs. Piast Gliwice, 3 April 2024, Polish Cup)
- Lowest home attendance: 5,417 (vs. Górnik Łęczna, 10 December 2023, I liga)
- Average home league attendance: 16,613
Home colours	Away colours	Third colours
- All statistics correct as of 26 May 2024.

The 2023–24 Wisła Kraków season was the ninth season in the I liga and the 71st season in the Polish Cup.

== Transfers ==
=== Summer transfer window ===
==== Arrivals ====
- The following players moved to Wisła.

	Name	Position	Transfer type	Previous club	Fee	Ref.
Substituted on	(Spain) Jesús Alfaro	Midfielder	21 June 2023	(Spain) CD Badajoz	Free	
Substituted on	(Spain) Álvaro Ratón	Goalkeeper	24 June 2023	(Spain) Real Zaragoza	Free	
Substituted on	(Poland) Dawid Olejarka	Midfielder	24 June 2023	(Poland) Stal Rzeszów	€50,000	
Substituted on	(Spain) Goku	Forward	28 June 2023	(Poland) Podbeskidzie Bielsko-Biała	€125,000	
Substituted on	(Poland) Patryk Gogół	Midfielder	29 June 2023	(Poland) Lech Poznań II	Free	
Substituted on	(Poland) Szymon Sobczak	Forward	30 June 2023	(Poland) Zagłębie Sosnowiec	Free	
Substituted on	(Spain) Eneko Satrústegui	Defender	4 July 2023	(Spain) Racing de Santander	Free	
Substituted on	(Poland) Karol Tokarczyk	Midfielder	15 July 2023	(Poland) Wisła Kraków U19	Free	
Substituted on	(Poland) Patryk Letkiewicz	Goalkeeper	15 July 2023	(Poland) Wisła Kraków U19	Free	
Substituted on	(Poland) Mariusz Kutwa	Defender	15 July 2023	(Poland) Wisła Kraków U19	Free	
Substituted on	(Spain) Ángel Baena	Midfielder	17 July 2023	(Spain) CD Lugo	Free	
Substituted on	(Spain) Marc Carbó	Midfielder	3 August 2023	(Spain) CD Lugo	Free	
	Return from loan spell					
Substituted on	(Serbia) Nikola Kuveljić	Midfielder	30 June 2023	(Serbia) TSC Bačka Topola	Free	
Substituted on	(Israel) Dor Hugi	Midfielder	30 June 2023	(Israel) Bnei Sakhnin F.C.	Free	
Substituted on	(North Macedonia) Enis Fazlagikj	Midfielder	30 June 2023	(Slovakia) FC DAC 1904 Dunajska Streda	Free	
Substituted on	(Croatia) Ivan Jelić Balta	Midfielder	30 June 2023	(Bosnia and Herzegovina) FK Sarajevo	Free	
Substituted on	(Poland) Hubert Sobol	Forward	30 June 2023	(Poland) Górnik Łęczna	Free	
Substituted on	(Poland) Dorian Gądek	Midfielder	30 June 2023	(Poland) Garbarnia Kraków	Free	
Substituted on	(Poland) Daniel Hoyo-Kowalski	Defender	30 June 2023	(Poland) Wieczysta Kraków	Free	
Substituted on	(Poland) Paweł Koncewicz–Żyłka	Defender	30 June 2023	(Poland) Wieczysta Kraków	Free	

==== Departures ====
- The following players moved from Wisła.

	Name	Position	Transfer type	New club	Fee	Ref.
	Transfer					
Substituted off	(Poland) Patryk Plewka	Midfielder	23 June 2023	(Poland) Chrobry Głogów	Free	
Substituted off	(Serbia) Nikola Kuveljić	Midfielder	1 July 2023	(Serbia) FK TSC	€150,000	
Substituted off	(Spain) Sergio Benito	Forward	1 July 2023	(Spain) CF Fuenlabrada	Free	
Substituted off	(Czech Republic) Zdeněk Ondrášek	Forward	1 July 2023	(Czech Republic) SK Dynamo České Budějovice	Free	
Substituted off	(Poland) Daniel Hoyo-Kowalski	Defender	1 July 2023	(Poland) Hutnik Kraków	Free	
Substituted off	(Poland) Kacper Przybyłko	Defender	1 July 2023	(Poland) Warta Poznań	Free	
Substituted off	(Poland) Paweł Koncewicz-Żyłka	Defender	1 July 2023	(Poland) Wieczysta Kraków	Free	
Substituted off	(Poland) Konrad Gruszkowski	Midfielder	1 July 2023	(Slovakia) DAC Dunajská Streda	Free	
Substituted off	(Spain) Álex Mula	Forward	3 July 2023	(Greece) PAS Lamia 1964	Free	
Substituted off	(Croatia) Ivan Jelić Balta	Defender	4 July 2023	(Bosnia and Herzegovina) FK Sarajevo	Free	
Substituted off	(Spain) Luis Fernández	Forward	12 July 2023	(Poland) Lechia Gdańsk	Free	
Substituted off	(Israel) Dor Hugi	Midfielder	17 July 2023	(Israel) Bnei Sakhnin	Free	
Substituted off	(Poland) Jakub Błaszczykowski	Midfielder	20 July 2023	Retired		
Substituted off	(Poland) Hubert Sobol	Forward	25 July 2022	(Poland) KKS Kalisz	Free	
Substituted off	(Spain) Tachi	Defender	4 August 2023	(Spain) CD Mirandés	Free	
Substituted off	(France) Boris Moltenis	Defender	16 August 2023	Austria Lustenau	€25,000	
	On loan					
Substituted off	(Poland) Piotr Starzyński	Defender	1 July 2023	(Poland) Wieczysta Kraków	Free	
Substituted off	(Poland) Kacper Skrobański	Defender	4 July 2023	(Poland) Górnik Łęczna	Free	
Substituted off	(Poland) Patryk Letkiewicz	Goalkeeper	31 August 2023	(Poland) Wieczysta Kraków	Free	
Substituted off	(Poland) Mateusz Młyński	Forward	1 September 2023	(Poland) Górnik Łęczna	Free	
	End of loan					
Substituted off	(Nigeria) James Igbekeme	Midfielder	30 June 2023	(Spain) Real Zaragoza	Free	
Substituted off	(Guinea) Momo Cissé	Midfielder	30 June 2023	(Germany) VfB Stuttgart	Free	

=== Winter transfer window ===
==== Arrivals ====
- The following players moved to Wisła.

	Name	Position	Transfer type	Previous club	Fee	Ref.
Substituted on	(Albania) Dejvi Bregu	Forward	26 January 2024	(Turkey) Ümraniyespor	Free	
Substituted on	(Belarus) Anton Chichkan	Goalkeeper	20 February 2024	(Georgia (country)) Dinamo Batumi	Free	
Substituted on	(Poland) Karol Dziedzic	Midfielder	24 February 2024	(Poland) Garbarnia Kraków	Free	
Substituted on	(Algeria) Billel Omrani	Forward	26 February 2024	(Romania) Petrolul Ploiești	Free	

==== Departures ====
- The following players moved from Wisła.

	Name	Position	Transfer type	New club	Fee	Ref.
	Transfer					
Substituted off	(Poland) Dorian Frątczak	Goalkeeper	1 February 2024	(Poland) Hutnik Kraków	Free	
	On loan					
Substituted off	(Poland) Mikołaj Biegański	Goalkeeper	8 February 2024	(United States) San Jose Earthquakes	Free	
Substituted off	(North Macedonia) Enis Fazlagikj	Midfielder	16 February 2024	(Poland) Górnik Łęczna	Free	

== Competitions ==
Win Draw Loss Cancelled Fixtures

=== Preseason and friendlies ===
1 July 2023	Wisła Kraków	3−2	Stal Mielec	Myślenice, Poland
11:35 UTC+2	Rodado 41'; Ehmann 47' (o.g.); Villar 53'; Tachi (yellow card); Goku (yellow card); Krzyżanowski (yellow card); Młyński (yellow card)	Report	Wołkowicz 46'; Ehmann 58'	Stadium: Sport Myślenice; Attendance: 300; Referee: Robert Marciniak (Kraków)

7 July 2023	Wisła Kraków	3−1	(Israel) Hapoel Be'er Sheva	Myślenice, Poland
11:30 UTC+2	Rodado 1', 7', 36'; Tachi (yellow card)	Report	Safouri 69'; Elias (yellow card)	Stadium: Sport Myślenice; Referee: Tomasz Musiał (Kraków)

12 July 2023	Wisła Kraków	0−2	Polonia Bytom	Myślenice, Poland
12:00 UTC+2		Report	Gajda 58'; Andrzejczak 67', (yellow card); Ławrynowicz (yellow card); Radkiewicz (yellow card); Konieczny (yellow card)	Stadium: Sport Myślenice; Referee: Paweł Kukla (Kraków)

15 July 2023	Zagłębie Sosnowiec	0−0	Wisła Kraków	Sosnowiec, Poland
17:30 UTC+2	Ryndak (yellow card)	Report	Rodado (yellow card); Szot (yellow card)	Stadium: ArcelorMittal Park; Attendance: 900; Referee: Jacek Bielecki (Tychy)

25 July 2023	Wisła Kraków	1−1	(Israel) Hapoel Jerusalem	Myślenice, Poland
11:30 UTC+2	Tokarczyk 21'	Report	Bitton 25'	Stadium: Sport Myślenice; Referee: Seweryn Kozub (Brzesko)

8 September 2023	Wisła Kraków	0−2	GKS Tychy	Myślenice, Poland
11:30 UTC+2	Alfaro (yellow card)	Report	Rumin 53', (yellow card); Dijakovic 66', (yellow card)	Stadium: Sport Myślenice; Attendance: 0 Referee: Sebastian Krasny (Kraków)

13 October 2023	Stal Mielec	1−1	Wisła Kraków	Wola Chorzelowska, Poland
12:00 UTC+2	Shkurin 87'	Report	Sobczak 27'	Stadium: Hotel Rado

17 November 2023	Górnik Zabrze	1−0	Wisła Kraków	Zabrze, Poland
11:30 UTC+1	Musiolik 76'; Pacheco (yellow card)	Report		Stadium: Boczne boisko Górnika; Attendance: without spectators Referee: Sebastian Jarzębak (Bytom)

24 January 2024	Nassaji Mazandaran (Iran)	0−0	Wisła Kraków	Kadriye, Turkey
13:00 UTC+1		Report	Uryga (yellow card); Szot (red card) 87'	Stadium: IC Hotels Football Center

27 January 2024	Atyrau (Kazakhstan)	0−2	Wisła Kraków	Kadriye, Turkey
13:00 UTC+1	Noyok (yellow card)	Report	Baena 6'; Rodado 90'; Goku (yellow card); Fazlagikj (yellow card)	Stadium: IC Hotels Football Center

30 January 2024	Kolding IF (Denmark)	1−2	Wisła Kraków	Kadriye, Turkey
12:30 UTC+1	Tånnander 47'; Kristensen (yellow card); Jespersen (yellow card)	Report	Villar 28'; Carbó (yellow card) (red card) 45'; Szot 64', (yellow card); Łasicki (yellow card)	Stadium: Megasaray Football Center; Referee: Grzegorz Kawałko (Olsztyn)

2 February 2024	Arda Kardzhali (Bulgaria)	2−2	Wisła Kraków	Çolaklı, Turkey
12:55 UTC+1	Kotev 60'; Yordanov 65'	Report	Rodado 25', (yellow card); Goku 28'	Stadium: Kamelya World

10 February 2024	Wisła Kraków	1−0	Górnik Łęczna	Myślenice, Poland
11:30 UTC+1	Basha (red card) 86'; Sobczak 95'; Carbó (yellow card)	Report		Stadium: Sport Myślenice; Referee: Mateusz Czerwień (Kraków)
Note: The game was played in two halves of 50 minutes each.

22 March 2024	Wisła Kraków	1−2	Stal Rzeszów	Myślenice, Poland
12:30 UTC+1	Bregu 43'	Report	Da Silva (penalty missed) 20'; Łysiak 45' (pen.); Danielewicz 78'	Stadium: Sport Myślenice; Referee: Tomasz Musiał (Kraków)

=== I liga ===
==== League table ====
Pos	Team	Pld	W	D	L	GF	GA	GD	Pts	Promotion or Relegation
8	Miedź Legnica	34	13	12	9	52	36	+16	51 (Note: Wisła Płock finished ahead of Miedź Legnica and GKS Tychy on head-to-head points: Wisła Płock 9, Miedź Legnica 5, GKS Tychy 2)	
9	GKS Tychy	34	16	3	15	43	47	−4	51	
10	Wisła Kraków	34	13	11	10	62	50	+12	50	Qualification for Europa League first qualifying round (Note: Wisła Kraków qualified for the Europa League first qualifying round as the 2023–24 Polish Cup winners.)
11	Stal Rzeszów	34	14	6	14	53	60	−7	48	
12	Chrobry Głogów	34	11	9	14	35	49	−14	42 (Note: Chrobry Głogów finished ahead of Znicz Pruszków on head-to-head points: Chrobry Głogów 1–0 Znicz Pruszków, Znicz Pruszków 0–0 Chrobry Głogów)	

Source: 1liga.org, 90minut.pl
Rules for classification: 1) Points; 2) Head-to-head points; 3) Head-to-head goal difference; 4) Goal difference; 6) Goals scored; 7) Number of wins; 8) Number of away wins.
(Note: Head-to-head record was used only after all the matches between the teams in question have been played)

==== Results summary ====
Overall								Home						Away					
Pld	W	D	L	GF	GA	GD	Pts	W	D	L	GF	GA	GD	W	D	L	GF	GA	GD
34	13	11	10	62	50	+12	50	8	4	5	35	23	+12	5	7	5	27	27	0

Last updated: 26 May 2024.
Source: 90minut

==== Results by round ====
Round	1	2	3	4	5	6	7	8	9	10	11	12	13	14	15	16	17	18	19	20	21	22	23	24	25	26	27	28	29	30	31	32	33	34
Ground	A	A	H	A	H	H	A	H	A	H	H	H	A	H	A	H	A	H	H	A	H	A	A	H	A	H	A	A	A	H	A	H	A	H
Result	D	W	D	L	L	W	D	D	W	D	W	W	L	D	D	W	L	W	W	W	L	W	D	W	L	L	D	W	D	W	D	L	L	L
Position	7	6	6	10	14	8	9	11	10	9	5	5	8	8	9	8	8	7	5	5	5	5	5	4	5	7	7	4	5	5	6	7	9	10

Updated to match(es) played on 26 May 2024. Source: 90minut
A = Away; H = Home; W = Win; D = Draw; L = Loss

==== Matches ====
23 July 2023 1	Górnik Łęczna	2−2	Wisła Kraków	Łęczna
17:30 UTC+2	Kozak 28'; Deja 86'; De Amo (yellow card) 90+1'; Gostomski (yellow card) 90+4'; Kozak (yellow card) 90+4'	Report	Łasicki (yellow card) 1'; Goku 39', (yellow card) 90+4'; Villar 50', (yellow card) 90+5'; Juncà (yellow card) 90+4'; Olejarka (yellow card) 90+8'	Stadium: Stadion Górnika Łęczna; Attendance: 2,450; Referee: Leszek Lewandowski (Zabrze)

30 July 2023 2	Polonia Warsaw	2–3	Wisła Kraków	Warsaw
12:40 UTC+2	Bajdur (yellow card) 24'; Michalski 64'; Koton (yellow card) 68'; Kobusiński (yellow card) 70' (yellow-red card) 90+6'; Pawłowski (yellow card) 90+3'; Grudniewski 90+7'	Report	Basha (yellow card) 4'; Villar 44'; Rodado 53'; Juncà (yellow card) 74'; Sobczak 90'	Stadium: Stadion Miejski im. gen. Kazimierza Sosnkowskiego; Attendance: 4,151; Referee: Grzegorz Kawałko (Olsztyn)

5 August 2023 3	Wisła Kraków	0−0	Stal Rzeszów	Kraków
17:30 UTC+2	Satrústegui (yellow card) 23'; Gogół (yellow card) 78'; Krzyżanowski (yellow card) 80'; Jaroch (yellow card) 86'; Alfaro (yellow card) 90+8'	Report	Prokić (yellow card) 21'; Danielewicz (yellow card) 75'; Sadłocha (yellow card) 84'; Wrąbel (yellow card) 88'; Poczobut (yellow card) 88'; Yavorskyi (yellow card) 90+1'	Stadium: Stadion im. Henryka Reymana; Attendance: 31,916; Referee: Jacek Małyszek (Lublin)

12 August 2023 4	GKS Tychy	1−0	Wisła Kraków	Tychy
17:30 UTC+2	Nedić (yellow card) 35'; Błachewicz 41'; Połap (yellow card) 43'; Budnicki (yellow card) 65'; Radecki (yellow card) 84'	Report	Jaroch (yellow card) 26'; Szot (yellow card) 80'; Satrústegui (yellow card) 84'	Stadium: Stadion Miejski; Attendance: 7,198; Referee: Piotr Urban (Warsaw)

18 August 2023 5	Wisła Kraków	1−3	Odra Opole	Kraków
20:30 UTC+2	Duda (yellow card) 6'; Sapała (yellow card) 18' (yellow-red card) 19'; Alfaro 45+1'; Rodado (yellow card) 49'; Szot (yellow card) 54'; Sobczak (yellow card) 76'	Report	Szrek (yellow card) 25'; Purzycki (yellow card) 38'; Żemło 80'; Sula 84', 90+7'; Antczak (yellow card) 90+4'	Stadium: Stadion im. Henryka Reymana; Attendance: 13,376; Referee: Marcin Szczerbowicz (Olsztyn)

27 August 2023 6	Wisła Kraków	5−1	Arka Gdynia	Kraków
12:40 UTC+2	Rodado 5', 37', 83'; Goku (yellow card) 24', (goal) 73'; Colley (yellow card) 89'; Olejarka 90+5'	Report	Czubak 10', (yellow card) 87'; Gojny (yellow card) 51'; Azatskyi (yellow card) 54'	Stadium: Stadion im. Henryka Reymana; Attendance: 14,118; Referee: Piotr Lasyk (Bytom)

1 September 2023 7	Miedź Legnica	1−1	Wisła Kraków	Legnica
20:30 UTC+2	Hoogenhout (yellow card) 16'; Aguado (yellow card) 77'; Mansfeld 80'	Report	Satrústegui (yellow card) 22'; Alfaro 46'; Jaroch (yellow card) 51'; Juncà (yellow card) 70'; Carbó (yellow card) 76'; Basha (yellow card) 84'; Uryga (yellow card) 87'	Stadium: Stadion Miejski im. Orła Białego; Attendance: Szymon Marciniak (Płock); Referee: 4,764

16 September 2023 8	Wisła Kraków	1−1	Chrobry Głogów	Kraków
17:30 UTC+2	Goku 40'	Report	Lebedyński 7', (yellow card) 39'; Mucha (yellow card) 69'	Stadium: Stadion im. Henryka Reymana; Attendance: 15,069; Referee: Wojciech Myć (Lublin)

23 September 2023 9	Motor Lublin	1−4	Wisła Kraków	Lublin
17:30 UTC+2	Najemski 74'; Król (yellow card) 90+2'; Wojtkowski (red card) 90+2'; Wolski (red card) 90+6'	Report	Rodado (yellow card) 18', (goal) 29', 63' (pen.); Najemski 22' (o.g.); Carbó (yellow card) 45+4'; Basha (yellow card) 83'; Alfaro (yellow card) 87'; Goku (penalty missed) 90+4, 90+4'; Colley (yellow card) 90+5'; Juncà (red card) 90+5'	Stadium: Arena Lublin; Attendance: 11,827; Referee: Tomasz Kwiatkowski (Warsaw)

1 October 2023 10	Wisła Kraków	0−0	Wisła Płock	Kraków
12:40 UTC+2	Colley (yellow card) 42'	Report	Srećković (yellow card) 33'; Spremo (yellow card) 44'; Thiakane (yellow card) 52'; Hiszpański (yellow card) 90+4'	Stadium: Stadion im. Henryka Reymana; Attendance: 14,881; Referee: Piotr Lasyk (Bytom)

7 October 2023 11	Wisła Kraków	6−2	Znicz Pruszków	Kraków
17:30 UTC+2	Carbó (yellow card) 29'; Goku 37', 90+3'; Rodado 45+1', 45+3'; Baena 60'; Duda (yellow card) 79'; Villar 84'; Colley (yellow card) 89'	Report	Nagamatsu 22', 82'; Wójcicki (yellow card) 64'; Tkachuk (yellow card) 70'	Stadium: Stadion im. Henryka Reymana; Attendance: 12,603; Referee: Jacek Małyszek (Lublin)

20 October 2023 12	Wisła Kraków	4−1	Resovia Rzeszów	Kraków
20:30 UTC+2	Jaroch 19'; Rodado 55', (penalty missed) 75'; Sobczak 85'; Villar 89'; Goku (yellow card) 90+3'	Report	Mikulec (yellow card) 32'; Mazek 81'	Stadium: Stadion im. Henryka Reymana; Attendance: 13,748; Referee: Marcin Kochanek (Opole)

27 October 2023 13	Podbeskidzie Bielsko-Biała	2−1	Wisła Kraków	Bielsko-Biała
20:30 UTC+2	Banaszewski 23'; Milašius (yellow card) 39'; Kolenc (penalty missed) 42'; Willmann (yellow card) 45+2'; Bida 45+7', (yellow card) 73'; Chlumecký (yellow card) 90+2'; Procek (yellow card) 90+4'	Report	Villar 21'; Duda (red card) 30'; Jaroch (yellow card) 39'; Ratón (yellow card) 40'; Rodado (yellow card) 44'; Szot (yellow card) 72'	Stadium: Stadion Miejski; Attendance: 5,079; Referee: Krzysztof Jakubik (Siedlce)

3 November 2023 14	Wisła Kraków	0−0	Zagłębie Sosnowiec	Kraków
20:30 UTC+1	Gogół (yellow card) 26'	Report	Karwot (yellow card) 34'; Machała (yellow card) 43'; Fábry (yellow card) 86'; Guezen (yellow card) 88'	Stadium: Stadion im. Henryka Reymana; Attendance: 14,269; Referee: Patryk Gryckiewicz (Toruń)

10 November 2023 15	Lechia Gdańsk	0−0	Wisła Kraków	Gdańsk
20:30 UTC+2	Neugebauer (yellow card) 36'; Zhelizko (yellow card) 90'	Report	Villar (yellow card) 10'; Gogół (yellow card) 25'; Carbó (yellow card) 65'	Stadium: Polsat Plus Arena Gdańsk; Attendance: 12,003; Referee: Łukasz Kuźma (Białystok)

25 November 2023 16	Wisła Kraków	3−2	GKS Katowice	Kraków
17:30 UTC+1	Goku 3', (yellow card); Colley (yellow card) 21'; Gogół 90+7'; Baena 90+10'; Olejarka (yellow card) 90+13'	Report	Repka (yellow card) 11'; Rogala (yellow card) 56'; Bergier (yellow card) 21', (goal) 57'; Mak 63'	Stadium: Stadion im. Henryka Reymana; Attendance: 15,221; Referee: Wojciech Myć (Lublin)

1 December 2023 17	Bruk-Bet Termalica Nieciecza	2−1	Wisła Kraków	Nieciecza
20:30 UTC+1	Biedrzycki (yellow card) 27'; Spendlhofer 35'; Purece 44'; Radwański (yellow card) 49'; Karasek (yellow card) 58'; Hilbrycht (yellow card) 67'; Ambrosiewicz (yellow card) 90+5'	Report	Sobczak 28' (pen.); Uryga (yellow card) 72'; Duda (yellow card) 75'; Satrústegui (yellow card) 88'	Stadium: Stadion Sportowy Bruk-Bet Termalica; Attendance: 2,571; Referee: Paweł Raczkowski (Warsaw)

10 December 2023 18	Wisła Kraków	4−0	Górnik Łęczna	Kraków
12:40 UTC+1	Baena (yellow card) 14'; Goku 26', 90+2'; Duda (yellow card) 48'; Sobczak 67', 74' (pen.)	Report		Stadium: Stadion im. Henryka Reymana; Attendance: 5,417; Referee: Sebastian Jarzębak (Bytom)

17 December 2023 19	Wisła Kraków	2−1	Polonia Warsaw	Kraków
12:40 UTC+1	Rodado 18', 90+5'; Colley (yellow card) 76'	Report	Okhronchuk (yellow card) 12'; Kobusiński 77'	Stadium: Stadion im. Henryka Reymana; Attendance: 14,417; Referee: Leszek Lewandowski (Zabrze)

18 February 2024 20	Stal Rzeszów	1−2	Wisła Kraków	Rzeszów
12:40 UTC+1	Bukowski 28'; Thill (yellow card) 67'; Danielewicz (penalty missed) 90'+1	Report	Rodado 43'; Carbó (yellow card) 85'; Satrústegui 90+6'	Stadium: Stadion Miejski Stal; Attendance: 6,018; Referee: Daniel Stefański (Bydgoszcz)

23 February 2024 21	Wisła Kraków	0−1	GKS Tychy	Kraków
20:30 UTC+1	Goku (yellow card) 29'; Duda (yellow card) 35'	Report	Budnicki (yellow card) 10'; Ertlthaler 20'; Nedić (yellow card) 34'; Kikolski (yellow card) 90+5'	Stadium: Stadion im. Henryka Reymana; Attendance: 16,254; Referee: Jarosław Przybył (Kluczbork)

2 March 2024 22	Odra Opole	1−2	Wisła Kraków	Opole
17:30 UTC+1	Spychała (yellow card) 52'; Niziołek (yellow card) 63', (goal) 90+4' (pen.); Piroch (yellow card) 80'	Report	Goku 50'; Bregu 54'; Carbó (yellow card) 88'; Ratón (yellow card) 90+3'; Sobczak (yellow card) 90+7'; Jaroch (yellow card) 90+9'	Stadium: Stadion Miejski Odra; Attendance: 3,482; Referee: Tomasz Wajda (Żywiec)

8 March 2024 23	Arka Gdynia	1−1	Wisła Kraków	Gdynia
20:30 UTC+1	Kobacki 13', (yellow card) 29'; Gojny (yellow card) 37'; Milewski (yellow card) 80'; Borecki (yellow card) 90+4'	Report	Alfaro (yellow card) 34'; Sobczak 75'	Stadium: Stadion Miejski; Attendance: 8,991; Referee: Paweł Raczkowski (Warsaw)

15 March 2024 24	Wisła Kraków	2−0	Miedź Legnica	Kraków
20:30 UTC+1	Krzyżanowski (yellow card) 45+2'; Rodado 79', 90+1'	Report	Antonik (yellow card) 17'; Mijušković (yellow card) 34'; Aguado (yellow card) 45'; Salvador (yellow card) 55'	Stadium: Stadion im. Henryka Reymana; Attendance: 17,129; Referee: Tomasz Kwiatkowski (Warsaw)

30 March 2024 25	Chrobry Głogów	3−2	Wisła Kraków	Głogów
17:30 UTC+2	Bartlewicz 48'; Lebedyński 56' (pen.); Zarówny 74', (yellow card) 87'; Michalec (yellow card) 90+8'	Report	Jaroch (yellow card) 13'; Sobczak 45+4', (yellow card) 90+8'; Ratón (yellow card) 55'; Uryga (yellow card) 59', (goal) 90+5'; Colley (yellow card) 72'	Stadium: Stadion Chrobrego Głogów; Attendance: 2,122; Referee: Marcin Kochanek (Opole)

7 April 2024 26	Wisła Kraków	1−3	Motor Lublin	Kraków
12:40 UTC+2	Jaroch (red card) 7'; Alfaro (yellow card) 16'; Szot (yellow card) 18'; Goku 26'; Łasicki (yellow card) 89'	Report	Stolarski (yellow card) 16'; Mráz 16', 58'; Rudol (yellow card) 45'; Ceglarz 49'; M. Król (yellow card) 57'; Scalet (yellow card) 62'	Stadium: Stadion im. Henryka Reymana; Attendance: 21,029; Referee: Marcin Szczerbowicz (Olsztyn)

13 April 2024 27	Wisła Płock	1−1	Wisła Kraków	Płock
17:30 UTC+2	Grič (yellow card) 29'; Gerbowski 58'; Hiszpański (yellow card) 88'	Report	Sapała 90'	Stadium: Orlen Stadion im. Kazimierza Górskiego; Attendance: 7,005; Referee: Wojciech Myć (Lublin)

19 April 2024 28	Znicz Pruszków	2−3	Wisła Kraków	Pruszków
20:30 UTC+2	Tabara 5'; Moskwik 22'; Nowak (yellow card) 32'; Kendzia (yellow card) 83'; Imai (yellow card) 86'	Report	Uryga (yellow card) 36', (goal) 70'; Żyro 53'; Rodado 78' (pen.)	Stadium: Stadion MZOS; Attendance: 1,672; Referee: Patryk Gryckiewicz (Toruń)

23 April 2024 29	Resovia Rzeszów	1−1	Wisła Kraków	Rzeszów
20:30 UTC+2	Wasiluk (yellow card) 13'; Eizenchart (yellow card) 45+2'; Tomal (yellow card) 60'; Górski 90+2'; Ciepiela (yellow card) 90+6'	Report	Carbó (yellow card) 73'; Rodado 90+1'; Żyro (yellow card) 90+4'	Stadium: Stadion Miejski Stal; Attendance: Daniel Stefański (Bydgoszcz); Referee: 2,126

26 April 2024 30	Wisła Kraków	3−1	Podbeskidzie Bielsko-Biała	Kraków
20:30 UTC+2	Duda (yellow card) 10'; Alfaro 16'; Rodado 32'; Carbó (yellow card) 54'; Uryga (yellow card) 90+1'; Gogół 90+3'	Report	Iličić 26'; Hlavica (yellow card) 45+2'; Senić (yellow card) 49'; Mikołajewski (yellow card) 90'	Stadium: Stadion im. Henryka Reymana; Attendance: 14,762; Referee: Łukasz Kuźma (Białystok)

6 May 2024 31	Zagłębie Sosnowiec	1−1	Wisła Kraków	Sosnowiec
18:00 UTC+2	Rozwandowicz 26'; Bonecki (yellow card) 29'; Polyarus (yellow card) 43' (yellow-red card) 57'; Kos (yellow card) 50'; Lipka (yellow card) 73'	Report	Duda (yellow card) 37'; Carbó (yellow card) 38'; Alfaro (yellow card) 50'; Rodado 90'; Sobczak (penalty missed) 90+5'; Łasicki (yellow card)	Stadium: ArcelorMittal Park; Attendance: 5,792; Referee: Patryk Gryckiewicz (Toruń)

11 May 2024 32	Wisła Kraków	3−4	Lechia Gdańsk	Kraków
17:30 UTC+2	Rodado 19', 89' (pen.); Juncà (yellow card) 25' (yellow-red card) 56'; Jaroch 43'; Colley (red card) 82'; Uryga (yellow card) 83'	Report	Khlan 32', 71'; Neugebauer 45+3' (pen.), 58' (pen.)	Stadium: Stadion im. Henryka Reymana; Attendance: 25,327; Referee: Bartosz Frankowski (Toruń)

18 May 2024 33	GKS Katowice	5−2	Wisła Kraków	Katowice
17:30 UTC+2	Jędrych 22'; Błąd 33'; Rogala 47'; Carbó 63' (o.g.); Marzec 90+2'	Report	Satrústegui (red card) 5'; Rodado 19', 82'; Duda (yellow card) 32'; Carbó (yellow card) 47'; Alfaro (yellow card) 64'; Uryga (yellow card) 89'	Stadium: Stadion GKS Katowice; Attendance: 7,455; Referee: Paweł Raczkowski (Warsaw)

26 May 2024 34	Wisła Kraków	0−3	Bruk-Bet Termalica Nieciecza	Kraków
15:00 UTC+2	Carbó (red card) 25'; Rodado (yellow card) 68'	Report	Kasperkiewicz (yellow card) 9'; Wolski (yellow card) 17', (goal) 53', 72'; Wróbel 89'	Stadium: Stadion im. Henryka Reymana; Attendance: 22,886; Referee: Piotr Lasyk (Bytom)

=== Polish Cup ===
28 September 2023 Round 1	Wisła Kraków	2−1 (a.e.t.)	Lechia Gdańsk	Kraków
21:00 UTC+2	Olejarka 21', (yellow card) 49'; Baena 105'; Rodado (yellow card) 112'	Report	Kałahur (yellow card) 51'; Fernández (penalty missed) 90, 90+7' (pen.), (yellow card) 90+7'; Khlan (yellow card) 90+8' (yellow-red card) 118'	Stadium: Stadion im. Henryka Reymana; Attendance: 10,091; Referee: Jarosław Przybył (Kluczbork)

7 November 2023 Round 2	Wisła Kraków	3−0	Polonia Warsaw	Kraków
21:00 UTC+1	Łasicki (yellow card) 30'; Satrústegui (yellow card) 44'; Sobczak 68'; Jaroch 84'; Rodado 89'; Goku (penalty missed) 90'+4	Report	Piątek (yellow card) 25' (yellow-red card) 35'; Kobusiński (yellow card) 90+5'	Stadium: Stadion im. Henryka Reymana; Attendance: 11,088; Referee: Damian Kos (Gdańsk)

7 December 2023 Round of 16	Wisła Kraków	4−1	Stal Rzeszów	Kraków
18:00 UTC+1	Szot 7'; Rodado 50'; Talar 52'; Gogół 67'	Report	Šimčák (yellow card) 30'; Kądziołka 66'	Stadium: Stadion im. Henryka Reymana; Attendance: 9,580; Referee: Tomasz Wajda (Żywiec)

28 February 2024 Quarterfinal	Wisła Kraków	2−1 (a.e.t.)	Widzew Łódź	Kraków
20:30 UTC+1	Łasicki (yellow card) 33'; Colley (yellow card) 38'; Sobczak (yellow card) 89', (goal) 119'; Carbó (yellow card) 90+12'; Rodado 90+19'; Uryga (yellow card) 90+21'; Szot (yellow card) 111'	Report	Nunes (yellow card) 49'; Pawłowski 80' (pen.); Rondić (yellow card) 90+2'; Kastrati (yellow card) 90+15'; Cybulski (yellow card) 90+18'; Szota (yellow card) 90+21'	Stadium: Stadion im. Henryka Reymana; Attendance: 26,742; Referee: Damian Kos (Gdańsk)

3 April 2024 Semifinal	Wisła Kraków	2−1	Piast Gliwice	Kraków
17:30 UTC+2	Sobczak 1'; Alfaro 37'; Colley (yellow card) 55'; Bregu (yellow card) 73'; Carbó (yellow card) 76'	Report	Czerwiński (yellow card) 44'; Mosór 54'; Kostadinov (yellow card) 75'	Stadium: Stadion im. Henryka Reymana; Attendance: 33,000; Referee: Bartosz Frankowski (Toruń)

2 May 2024 Final	Pogoń Szczecin	1−2 (a.e.t.)	Wisła Kraków	Warsaw
16:00 UTC+2	Gamboa (yellow card) 19'; Koulouris 75', (yellow card) 90+2'; Wędrychowski (yellow card) 90+5'; Cojocaru (yellow card) 90+6'; Bichakhchyan (yellow card) 90+7'; Malec (yellow card) 90+8'	Report	Jaroch (yellow card) 40'; Uryga (yellow card) 90+2'; Satrústegui 90+9'; Rodado 93', (yellow card) 110'; Chichkan (yellow card) 120+2'	Stadium: Stadion Narodowy im. Kazimierza Górskiego; Attendance: 47,506; Referee: Tomasz Kwiatkowski (Warsaw)

== Squad and statistics ==
=== Appearances, goals and discipline ===
As of match played 26 May 2024

No.	Pos.	Nat	Name	Total		I liga		Polish Cup		Discipline	
No.	Pos.	Nat	Name	Apps	Goals	Apps	Goals	Apps	Goals	Yellow card	Red card
1	GK	(Poland) POL	Kamil Broda	5	0	2	0	3	0	0	0
5	DF	(Sweden) SWE	Joseph Colley	33	0	27+1	0	5	0	9	1
6	DF	(Poland) POL	Alan Uryga	33	2	28+1	2	3+1	0	8	0
7	MF	(Poland) POL	Igor Sapała	19	1	6+11	1	1+1	0	1	1
8	MF	(Spain) ESP	Marc Carbó	33	0	27	0	4+2	0	12	1
9	FW	(Spain) ESP	Ángel Rodado	35	26	28+2	22	2+3	4	6	0
10	FW	(Spain) ESP	Miki Villar	34	5	22+7	5	1+4	0	2	0
11	FW	(Albania) ALB	Dejvi Bregu	14	1	4+8	1	1+1	0	1	0
14	FW	(Poland) POL	Michał Żyro	11	1	0+8	1	0+3	0	1	0
15	FW	(Poland) POL	Marcin Bartoń	0	0	0	0	0	0	0	0
17	FW	(Spain) ESP	Jesús Alfaro	39	4	29+4	3	6	1	6	0
18	MF	(Poland) POL	Bartosz Talar	10	1	0+7	0	1+2	1	0	0
19	DF	(Spain) ESP	Eneko Satrústegui	17	2	11+4	1	1+1	1	4	1
20	MF	(Poland) POL	Karol Dziedzic	1	0	0+1	0	0	0	0	0
21	MF	(Poland) POL	Patryk Gogół	19	3	3+14	2	0+2	1	3	0
22	MF	(Spain) ESP	Goku	34	11	24+5	11	2+3	0	5	0
23	FW	(Poland) POL	Szymon Sobczak	35	10	13+17	7	5	3	4	0
25	DF	(Poland) POL	Bartosz Jaroch	34	3	25+4	2	4+1	1	7	1
26	DF	(Poland) POL	Igor Łasicki	14	0	8+2	0	3+1	0	5	0
28	DF	(Spain) ESP	David Juncà	18	0	12+5	0	1	0	4	2
29	FW	(Algeria) ALG	Billel Omrani	2	0	0+2	0	0	0	0	0
31	GK	(Belarus) BLR	Anton Chichkan	6	0	5	0	1	0	1	0
41	MF	(Poland) POL	Kacper Duda	34	0	29+1	0	4	0	8	1
43	DF	(Poland) POL	Dawid Szot	32	1	14+12	0	6	1	5	0
50	DF	(Poland) POL	Mariusz Kutwa	7	0	1+5	0	0+1	0	0	0
51	MF	(Poland) POL	Karol Tokarczyk	0	0	0	0	0	0	0	0
52	DF	(Poland) POL	Jakub Krzyżanowski	21	0	10+9	0	1+1	0	2	0
53	GK	(Poland) POL	Jakub Stępak	0	0	0	0	0	0	0	0
54	DF	(Poland) POL	Kuba Wiśniewski	1	0	0+1	0	0	0	0	0
55	FW	(Poland) POL	Dominik Sarga	1	0	0+1	0	0	0	0	0
66	MF	(Albania) ALB	Vullnet Basha	10	0	4+4	0	1+1	0	3	0
77	FW	(Spain) ESP	Ángel Baena	36	3	14+16	2	5+1	1	1	0
80	MF	(Poland) POL	Dawid Olejarka	12	2	1+8	1	2+1	1	2	0
93	GK	(Spain) ESP	Álvaro Ratón	29	0	27	0	2	0	3	0
Players transferred or loaned out during the season
3	DF	(Spain) ESP	Tachi	1	0	0+1	0	0	0	0	0
4	DF	(France) FRA	Boris Moltenis	0	0	0	0	0	0	0	0
11	MF	(Poland) POL	Mateusz Młyński	0	0	0	0	0	0	0	0
24	MF	(North Macedonia) MKD	Enis Fazlagikj	0	0	0	0	0	0	0	0
31	GK	(Poland) POL	Mikołaj Biegański	0	0	0	0	0	0	0	0
53	GK	(Poland) POL	Patryk Letkiewicz	0	0	0	0	0	0	0	0

=== Goalscorers ===
As of match played 26 May 2024

Rank	Pos.	Nat	No.	Player	I liga	Polish Cup	Total
1	FW	(Spain)	9	Ángel Rodado	22	4	26
2	MF	(Spain)	22	Goku	11	0	11
3	FW	(Poland)	23	Szymon Sobczak	7	3	10
4	FW	(Spain)	10	Miki Villar	5	0	5
5	FW	(Spain)	17	Jesús Alfaro	3	1	4
6	MF	(Poland)	21	Patryk Gogół	2	1	3
6	DF	(Poland)	25	Bartosz Jaroch	2	1	3
6	FW	(Spain)	77	Ángel Baena	2	1	3
9	DF	(Poland)	6	Alan Uryga	2	0	2
9	DF	(Spain)	19	Eneko Satrústegui	1	1	2
9	MF	(Poland)	80	Dawid Olejarka	1	1	2
12	MF	(Poland)	7	Igor Sapała	1	0	1
12	FW	(Albania)	11	Dejvi Bregu	1	0	1
12	FW	(Poland)	14	Michał Żyro	1	0	1
12	MF	(Poland)	18	Bartosz Talar	0	1	1
12	DF	(Poland)	43	Dawid Szot	0	1	1
				Own goal	1	0	1
TOTALS					62	15	77

=== Disciplinary record ===
No.	Pos.	Nat	Name	I liga			Polish Cup			Total			Notes
No.	Pos.	Nat	Name	Yellow card	Second yellow card	Red card	Yellow card	Second yellow card	Red card	Yellow card	Second yellow card	Red card	Notes
5	DF	(Sweden)	Joseph Colley	7		1	2			9		1	
6	DF	(Poland)	Alan Uryga	7			2			9			
7	MF	(Poland)	Igor Sapała	1	1					1	1		
8	MF	(Spain)	Marc Carbó	10		1	2			12		1	
9	FW	(Spain)	Ángel Rodado	4			2			6			
10	FW	(Spain)	Miki Villar	2						2			
11	FW	(Albania)	Dejvi Bregu				1			1			
14	FW	(Poland)	Michał Żyro	1						1			
17	FW	(Spain)	Jesús Alfaro	6						6			
19	DF	(Spain)	Eneko Satrústegui	4		1	1			5		1	
21	MF	(Poland)	Patryk Gogół	3						3			
22	MF	(Spain)	Goku	5						5			
23	FW	(Poland)	Szymon Sobczak	3			1			4			
25	DF	(Poland)	Bartosz Jaroch	6		1	1			7		1	
26	DF	(Poland)	Igor Łasicki	3			2			5			
28	DF	(Spain)	David Juncà	4	1	1				4	1	1	
31	GK	(Belarus)	Anton Chichkan				1			1			
41	MF	(Poland)	Kacper Duda	8		1				8		1	
43	DF	(Poland)	Dawid Szot	4			1			5			
52	DF	(Poland)	Jakub Krzyżanowski	2						2			
66	MF	(Albania)	Vullnet Basha	3						3			
77	FW	(Spain)	Ángel Baena	1			1			2			
80	MF	(Poland)	Dawid Olejarka	2			1			3			
93	GK	(Spain)	Álvaro Ratón	3			1			4			

Last updated: 26 May 2024
Source: Competitive matches
Only competitive matches
(yellow card) = Number of bookings; (second yellow card) = Number of sending offs after a second yellow card; (red card) = Number of sending offs by a direct red card.
