= Igor Sapała =

Polish footballer (born 1995)

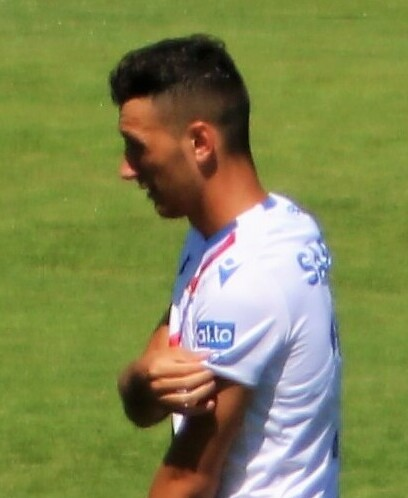
- Sapała with Raków Częstochowa in 2021

Personal information
- Date of birth: 11 October 1995 (age 31)
- Place of birth: Kartuzy, Poland
- Height: 1.87 m (6 ft 2 in)
- Position: Midfielder

Youth career
- –2012: Polonia Warsaw

Senior career*
Years	Team	Apps	(Gls)
2012–2015	Polonia Warsaw		
2014	→ Żyrardowianka Żyrardów (loan)		
2015	→ Bzura Chodaków (loan)		
2015–2016	Dolcan Ząbki	14	(1)
2016–2018	Piast Gliwice	4	(1)
2017	→ GKS Katowice (loan)	6	(0)
2017–2018	→ Raków Częstochowa (loan)	16	(1)
2018–2022	Raków Częstochowa	86	(2)
2023–2024	Wisła Kraków	25	(1)
2024	Wisła Kraków II	4	(1)

International career
2016	Poland U20	1	(0)
- * Club domestic league appearances and goals as of 8 November 2024

Igor Sapała (born 11 October 1995) is a Polish professional footballer who plays as a midfielder.

== Club career ==
=== Early career ===
At the age of 6, Sapała joined the junior teams of Polonia Warsaw. He was sent on loan to Żyrardowianka Żyrardów in 2014, then to Bzura Chodaków in early 2015.

=== Dolcan Ząbki ===
On 8 July 2015, after a short trial, he signed a contract with Dolcan Ząbki. He made his debut for the team on 1 August 2015 in a I liga match against Pogoń Siedlce. He scored the team's first goal in a league match against Zagłębie Sosnowiec on 31 October 2015.

=== Piast Gliwice and loan to GKS ===
On 3 March 2016, Sapała joined Piast Gliwice. He made his Ekstraklasa debut on 8 May 2016 against Legia Warsaw. He scored his first goal for Piast on 11 December 2016 in a 1–5 league defeat against Legia Warsaw. On 8 February 2017, he was loaned to GKS Katowice for six months. He made his debut for GKS on 10 March 2017 against Stomil Olsztyn.

=== Raków Częstochowa ===
On 25 July 2017, Sapała joined Raków Częstochowa on a one-year loan. He made his debut on 6 August 2017 in a league match against Puszcza Niepołomice. After the loan expired, Sapała joined Raków on a permanent basis. On 22 September 2018, during a I liga fixture against Warta Poznań, he fell on the ball and suffered a hand injury, which was a fracture of two forearm bones, with splinters and dislocations.

=== Wisła Kraków ===
On 13 December 2022, Sapała signed a contract with Wisła Kraków until June 2025. Throughout the 2023–24 season, Sapała made two Polish Cup appearances in the early rounds, as Wisła went on to win their fifth, and Sapała's third, cup title on 2 May 2024.

On 8 November 2024, having made his last first-team appearance in August, Sapała and Wisła agreed to part ways.

== International career ==
Sapała was called up to the Poland U20 in 2016. He made his debut on 23 March 2016 against Italy.

== Career statistics ==
As of match played 29 September 2024

Appearances and goals by club, season and competition
Club	Season	League			Polish Cup		Continental		Other		Total	
Club	Season	Division	Apps	Goals	Apps	Goals	Apps	Goals	Apps	Goals	Apps	Goals
Dolcan Ząbki	2015–16	I liga	14	1	0	0	—		—		14	1
Piast Gliwice	2015–16	Ekstraklasa	2	0	—		—		—		2	0
Piast Gliwice	2016–17	Ekstraklasa	2	1	0	0	—		—		2	1
Piast Gliwice	Total		4	1	0	0	—		—		4	1
GKS Katowice (loan)	2016–17	I liga	6	0	—		—		—		6	0
Raków Częstochowa (loan)	2017–18	I liga	16	1	—		—		—		16	1
Raków Częstochowa	2018–19	I liga	18	0	2	0	—		—		20	0
Raków Częstochowa	2019–20	Ekstraklasa	34	2	2	1	—		—		36	3
Raków Częstochowa	2020–21	Ekstraklasa	24	0	5	0	—		—		29	0
Raków Częstochowa	2021–22	Ekstraklasa	9	0	2	0	1 (Note: Appearance in UEFA Conference League)	0	—		12	0
Raków Częstochowa	2022–23	Ekstraklasa	1	0	0	0	1	0	1 (Note: Appearance in Polish Super Cup)	0	3	0
Raków Częstochowa	Total		102	3	11	1	2	0	1	0	116	4
Wisła Kraków	2022–23	I liga	7	0	0	0	—		—		7	0
Wisła Kraków	2023–24	I liga	17	1	2	0	—		—		19	1
Wisła Kraków	2024–25	I liga	1	0	0	0	3 (Note: Appearances in UEFA Europa League)	1	0	0	4	1
Wisła Kraków	Total		25	1	2	0	3	1	0	0	30	2
Wisła Kraków II	2024–25	III liga, group IV	4	1	—		—		—		4	1
Career total			155	7	13	1	5	1	1	0	174	9

== Honours ==
Raków Częstochowa

- Ekstraklasa: 2022–23
- I liga: 2018–19
- Polish Cup: 2020–21, 2021–22
- Polish Super Cup: 2022

Wisła Kraków

- Polish Cup: 2023–24
