= Bartosz Talar =

Polish footballer (born 2002)

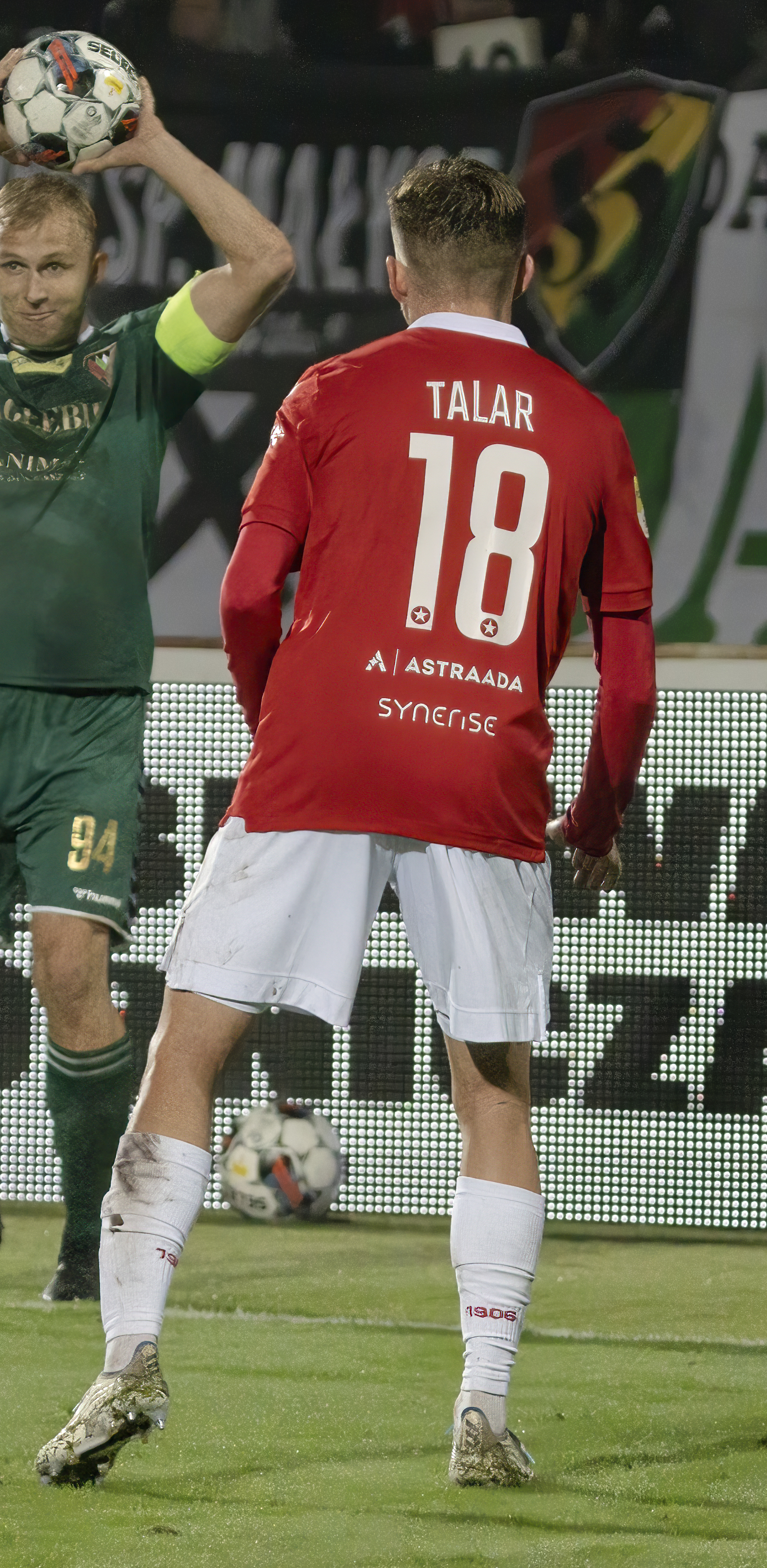
- Talar with Wisła Kraków in 2022

Personal information
- Date of birth: 23 September 2002 (age 24)
- Place of birth: Nowy Sącz, Poland
- Height: 1.76 m (5 ft 9 in)
- Position: Midfielder

Team information
- Current team: Wisła Kraków
- Number: 18

Youth career
- –2015: Dunajec Nowy Sącz
- 2015–2016: Lech Poznań
- 2016–2019: Dunajec Nowy Sącz
- 2019–2020: Lyon

Senior career*
| Years | Team | Apps | (Gls) |
| 2020–2022 | Lyon B | 21 | (0) |
| 2022– | Wisła Kraków | 20 | (0) |
| 2023– | Wisła Kraków II | 10 | (3) |

International career
| 2022 | Poland U20 | 5 | (0) |
- * Club domestic league appearances and goals as of 13:37, 26 May 2026 (UTC)

Bartosz Talar (born 23 September 2002) is a Polish professional footballer who plays as a midfielder for Ekstraklasa club Wisła Kraków.

== Early life ==
Talar was born in 2002 in Poland. He is a native of Nowy Sącz, Poland.

== Club career ==
In 2019, Talar signed for French side Lyon.

In 2022, he returned to Poland to join I liga outfit Wisła Kraków. In early 2024, he ruptured his ACL during training, ruling him out of play for the rest of the season. Before suffering his injury, Talar made three Polish Cup appearances during the 2023–24 campaign, as Wisła would go on to win the competition in May 2024. In July 2024, he extended his contract until the end of June 2026. His return from injury came on 29 March 2025, starting for Wisła II in a 5–0 win over Unia Tarnów. Two weeks later, during a league match against Wiślanie Skawina on 12 April, he sustained an ACL rupture in his right leg which would sideline him for the rest of the season. On 3 September 2026, while still recovering, Talar extended his contract with Wisła for another year.

== International career ==
Talar has represented Poland internationally at youth level, making five appearances for the under-20 team in 2022.

== Style of play ==
Talar mainly operates as a midfielder. He has operated as a winger while playing for Polish side Wisła Kraków.

== Career statistics ==
As of match played 12 April 2025

Appearances and goals by club, season and competition
| Club | Season | League | | | National cup (Note: Includes Polish Cup) | | Europe | | Other | | Total | |
| Club | Season | Division | Apps | Goals | Apps | Goals | Apps | Goals | Apps | Goals | Apps | Goals |
|---|---|---|---|---|---|---|---|---|---|---|---|---|
| Lyon B | 2021–22 | Ch. National 2 Group C | 1 | 0 | — | | — | | — | | 1 | 0 |
| Lyon B | 2021–22 | Ch. National 2 Group C | 20 | 0 | — | | — | | — | | 20 | 0 |
| Lyon B | Total | | 21 | 0 | — | | — | | — | | 21 | 0 |
| Wisła Kraków | 2022–23 | I liga | 13 | 0 | 2 | 0 | — | | — | | 15 | 0 |
| Wisła Kraków | 2023–24 | I liga | 7 | 0 | 3 | 1 | — | | — | | 10 | 1 |
| Wisła Kraków | 2024–25 | I liga | 0 | 0 | 0 | 0 | 0 | 0 | 0 | 0 | 0 | 0 |
| Wisła Kraków | 2025–26 | I liga | 0 | 0 | 0 | 0 | — | | — | | 0 | 0 |
| Wisła Kraków | 2026–27 | Ekstraklasa | 0 | 0 | 0 | 0 | — | | — | | 0 | 0 |
| Wisła Kraków | Total | | 20 | 0 | 5 | 1 | 0 | 0 | 0 | 0 | 25 | 1 |
| Wisła Kraków II | 2023–24 | IV liga Lesser Poland | 7 | 3 | — | | — | | — | | 7 | 3 |
| Wisła Kraków II | 2024–25 | III liga, group IV | 3 | 0 | — | | — | | — | | 3 | 0 |
| Wisła Kraków II | Total | | 10 | 3 | 0 | 0 | — | | — | | 10 | 3 |
| Career total | | | 51 | 3 | 5 | 1 | 0 | 0 | 0 | 0 | 56 | 4 |

== Honours ==
Wisła Kraków

- Polish Cup: 2023–24

Wisła Kraków II

- IV liga Lesser Poland: 2023–24
