= Kacper Duda =

Polish footballer (born 2004)

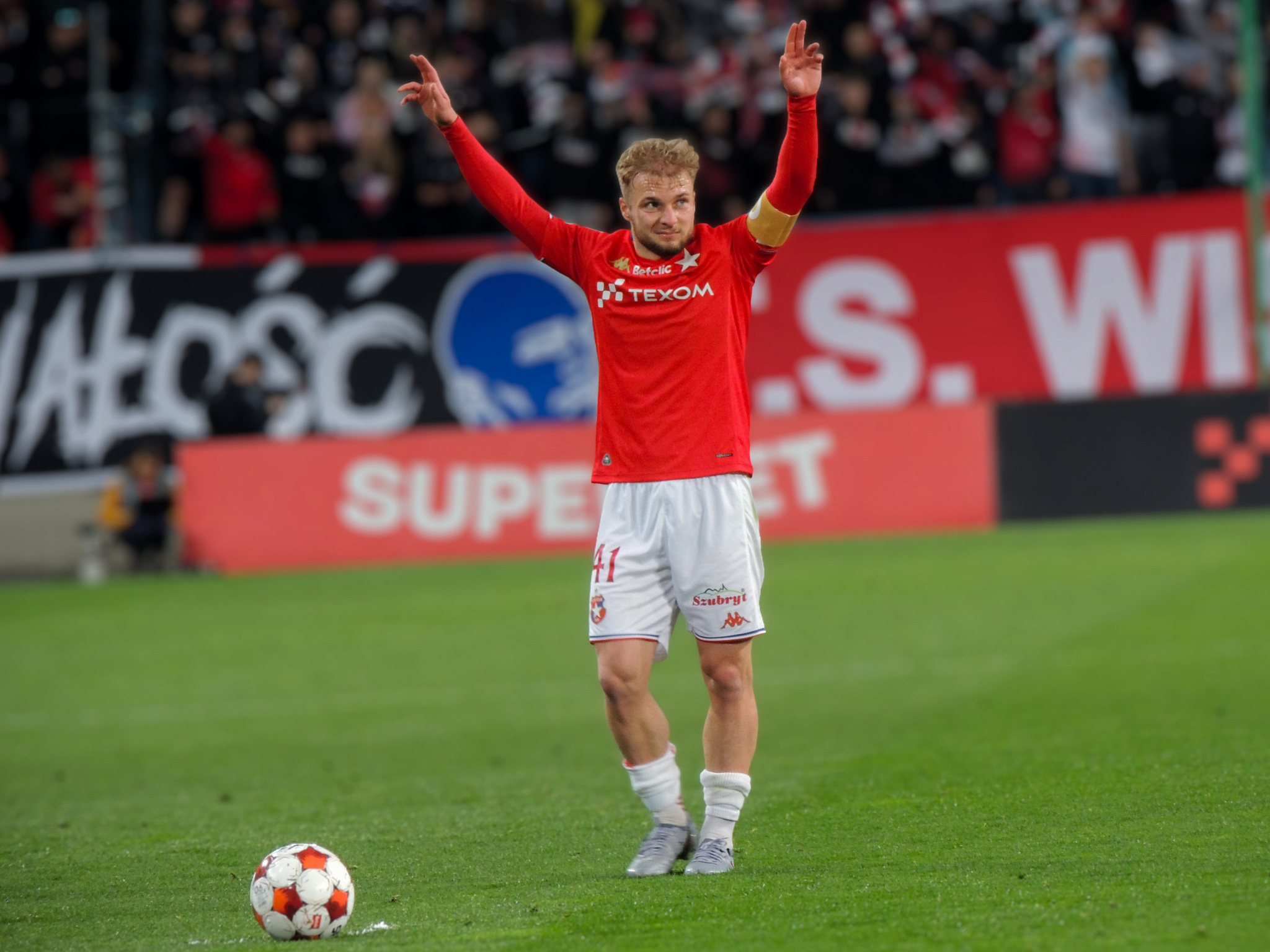
- Duda with Wisła Kraków in 2026

Personal information
- Date of birth: 1 January 2004 (age 22)
- Place of birth: Lędziny, Poland
- Height: 1.70 m (5 ft 7 in)
- Position: Midfielder

Team information
- Current team: Wisła Kraków
- Number: 41

Youth career
- –2016: Gol Bieruń
- 2016–2019: GKS Tychy

Senior career*
Years	Team	Apps	(Gls)
2019–	Wisła Kraków	129	(3)
2021–2022	→ Garbarnia Kraków (loan)	26	(2)

International career^{‡}
2019	Poland U15	6	(1)
2019	Poland U16	5	(0)
2023–2025	Poland U20	5	(0)
2024–	Poland U21	13	(1)
- * Club domestic league appearances and goals as of 14:52, 10 November 2026 (UTC) ‡ National team caps and goals as of 21:26, 19 November 2026 (UTC)

Kacper Duda (born 1 January 2004) is a Polish professional footballer who plays as a midfielder for Ekstraklasa club Wisła Kraków.

== Career ==
Duda started his senior career with Polish side Wisła Kraków. After coming back from a loan move to II liga club Garbarnia Kraków at the age of 18, Duda established himself as a regular in Wisła's line-up.

He started the 2023–24 Polish Cup final on 2 May 2024 before coming off in the 84th minute, as Wisła defeated Pogoń Szczecin 2–1 after extra time.

On 11 November 2024, Duda signed a contract extension with Wisła, keeping him at the club until mid-2027.

== Personal life ==
A native of Bieruń, Duda has an older brother Mateusz; they played together at Garbarnia during Kacper's loan move there. He supports Spanish La Liga side Barcelona.

== Career statistics ==
As of match played 6 November 2026

Appearances and goals by club, season and competition
Club	Season	League			Polish Cup		Europe		Other		Total	
Club	Season	Division	Apps	Goals	Apps	Goals	Apps	Goals	Apps	Goals	Apps	Goals
Garbarnia Kraków (loan)	2021–22	II liga	26	2	3	0	—		—		29	2
Wisła Kraków	2022–23	I liga	34	0	3	1	—		—		37	1
Wisła Kraków	2023–24	I liga	30	0	4	0	—		—		34	0
Wisła Kraków	2024–25	I liga	20	1	1	0	0	0	2 (Note: One appearance in I liga promotion play-offs, one appearance in Polish Super Cup)	0	23	1
Wisła Kraków	2025–26	I liga	30	1	3	1	—		—		33	2
Wisła Kraków	2026–27	Ekstraklasa	14	1	1	0	—		—		15	1
Wisła Kraków	Total		128	3	12	2	0	0	2	0	142	5
Career total			154	5	15	2	0	0	2	0	171	7

== Honours ==
Wisła Kraków

- I liga: 2025–26
- Polish Cup: 2023–24

Individual

- Polish Union of Footballers' I liga Young Player of the Season: 2023–24
