= Patryk Gogół =

Polish footballer (born 2003)

Personal information
- Date of birth: 18 March 2003 (age 23)
- Place of birth: Żory, Poland
- Height: 1.73 m (5 ft 8 in)
- Position: Midfielder

Team information
- Current team: Zagłębie Sosnowiec
- Number: 8

Youth career
- –2017: MKS Żory
- 2017–2020: Lech Poznań

Senior career*
Years	Team	Apps	(Gls)
2020–2023	Lech Poznań II	51	(1)
2023–2025	Wisła Kraków	33	(2)
2023	Wisła Kraków II	1	(0)
2025–	Zagłębie Sosnowiec	26	(3)

International career
2019	Poland U16	5	(1)
2019	Poland U17	4	(0)
2023–2024	Poland U20	2	(1)
- * Club domestic league appearances and goals as of 09:44, 31 May 2026 (UTC)

Patryk Gogół (born 18 March 2003) is a Polish professional footballer who plays as a midfielder for III liga club Zagłębie Sosnowiec.

== Early life ==
He is a native of Żory, Poland. He joined the youth academy of Polish side Lech Poznań at the age of fourteen.

== Club career ==
Gogół started his senior career playing for Lech Poznań's reserve team. In 2023, he moved to second-tier club Wisła Kraków. He suffered a knee injury in early 2024, keeping him out of play until April. On 2 May 2024, he came on the pitch in the 84th minute of a 2–1 win over Pogoń Szczecin in the 2023–24 Polish Cup final. Gogół left Wisła at the end of his contract in June 2025.

On 16 July 2025, Gogół signed a two-year deal with II liga club Zagłębie Sosnowiec.

== International career ==
Gogół was a Poland youth international. He was first called up to the Poland under-20s for a friendly match against the Czech Republic in November 2023.

== Style of play ==
He is mainly a midfielder, and can operate in every midfield position.

== Career statistics ==
As of match played 30 May 2026

Appearances and goals by club, season and competition
Club	Season	League			Polish Cup		Europe		Other		Total	
Club	Season	Division	Apps	Goals	Apps	Goals	Apps	Goals	Apps	Goals	Apps	Goals
Lech Poznań II	2020–21	II liga	1	0	0	0	—		—		1	0
Lech Poznań II	2021–22	II liga	23	0	3	1	—		—		26	1
Lech Poznań II	2022–23	II liga	27	1	0	0	—		—		27	1
Lech Poznań II	Total		51	1	3	1	—		—		54	2
Wisła Kraków	2023–24	I liga	17	2	2	1	—		—		19	3
Wisła Kraków	2024–25	I liga	16	0	1	0	8 (Note: Four appearances in UEFA Europa League, four appearances and one goal in UEFA Conference League)	1	0	0	25	1
Wisła Kraków	Total		33	2	3	1	8	1	0	0	44	4
Wisła Kraków II	2023–24	IV liga L. Pol.	1	0	—		—		—		1	0
Zagłębie Sosnowiec	2025–26	II liga	26	3	1	0	—		—		27	3
Career total			111	6	7	2	8	1	0	0	126	9

== Honours ==
Wisła Kraków

- Polish Cup: 2023–24

Wisła Kraków II

- IV liga Lesser Poland: 2023–24
