= Álvaro Ratón =

Spanish footballer

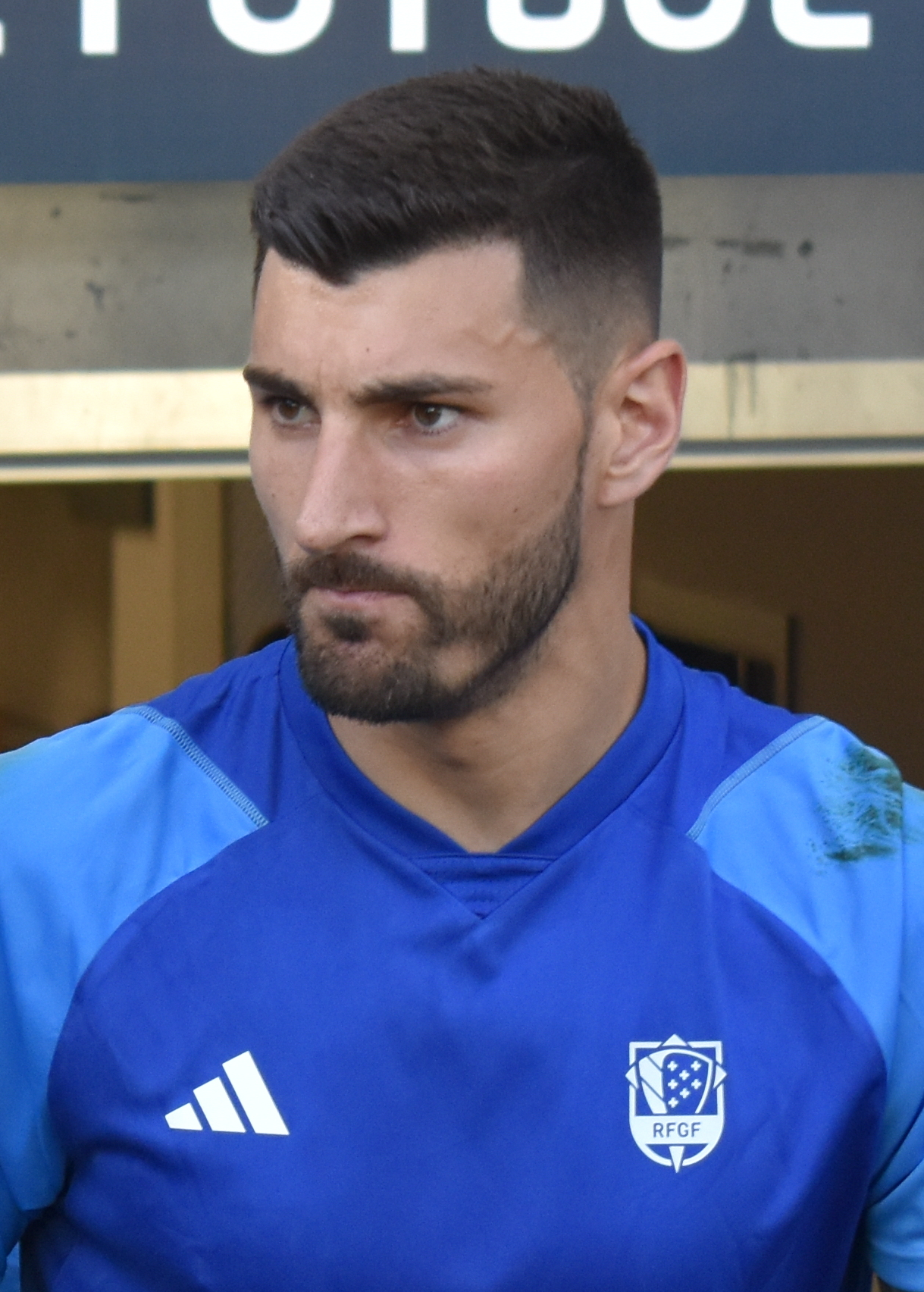
- Ratón with Galicia in 2024

Personal information
- Full name: Álvaro López Ratón
- Date of birth: 29 January 1993 (age 33)
- Place of birth: O Carballiño, Spain
- Height: 1.92 m (6 ft 3 1/2 in)
- Position: Goalkeeper

Team information
- Current team: Ourense
- Number: 1

Youth career
- Arenteiro
- Pabellón
- 2007–2010: Valencia
- 2010–2011: Deportivo La Coruña
- 2011–2012: Montañeros

Senior career*
| Years | Team | Apps | (Gls) |
| 2012–2013 | Arroyo | 0 | (0) |
| 2013 | Algeciras | 5 | (0) |
| 2013–2014 | Betis B | 2 | (0) |
| 2014–2015 | Villanovense | 15 | (0) |
| 2015–2016 | Zaragoza B | 43 | (0) |
| 2016–2023 | Zaragoza | 56 | (0) |
| 2023–2024 | Wisła Kraków | 27 | (0) |
| 2024–2025 | Lamia | 12 | (0) |
| 2025– | Ourense | 33 | (0) |

International career^{‡}
| 2024– | Galicia | 1 | (0) |
- * Club domestic league appearances and goals as of 10 June 2026 ‡ National team caps and goals as of 3 June 2024

Álvaro López Ratón (born 29 January 1993) is a Spanish professional footballer who plays as a goalkeeper for Primera Federación club Ourense.

== Club career ==
=== Early career ===
Born in O Carballiño, Ourense, Galicia, Ratón joined Valencia CF's youth setup in 2007, aged 13, after spells at CD Arenteiro and Pabellón CF. He subsequently represented Deportivo de La Coruña and Montañeros CF as a youth, before signing for Arroyo CP in 2012.

After making no appearances for Arroyo, Ratón left the club in December 2012 and moved to Algeciras CF in Tercera División. He made his senior debut on 10 February 2013, starting in a 2–0 home win against CD Alcalá.

Ratón joined Real Betis' reserve team also in the fourth level in June 2013, after impressing on a trial. After being rarely used, he signed with CF Villanovense on 17 July 2014.

=== Zaragoza ===
On 12 June 2015 Ratón moved to another reserve team, Real Zaragoza B in the fourth division. On 15 July of the following year, after being an undisputed starter, he renewed his contract until 2019 and was definitely promoted to the first team.

Ratón made his professional debut on 7 September, starting in a 1–2 Copa del Rey home loss against Real Valladolid. He made his Segunda División debut on 23 October, playing the full 90 minutes in a 0–0 away draw against the same opponent.

After overtaking Xabi Irureta and Sebastián Saja in his first season, Ratón spent the following years as a backup to Cristian Álvarez. On 2 June 2023, he left the club after eight seasons as his contract was due to expire.

=== Wisła Kraków ===
On 24 June 2023, Ratón moved abroad to join Polish second division side Wisła Kraków on a one-year deal. He made two Polish Cup appearances during the 2023–24 season, in two 2–1 victories over Ekstraklasa clubs Widzew Łódź and Piast Gliwice, as Wisła went on to win the final against Pogoń Szczecin on 2 May 2024.

On 26 April 2024, his contract was extended for another year. He made no further appearances for Wisła past that point, and left the club by mutual consent on 13 June 2024.

=== Lamia ===
On 4 July 2024, Ratón signed with Super League Greece club Lamia.

== International career ==
Ratón earned his first cap for Galicia in the region's first match in eight years on 31 May 2024, coming on as a substitute in the 33rd minute of a 0–2 friendly loss to Panama.

== Honours ==
Wisła Kraków

- Polish Cup: 2023–24
