= Jakub Krzyżanowski =

Polish footballer (born 2006)

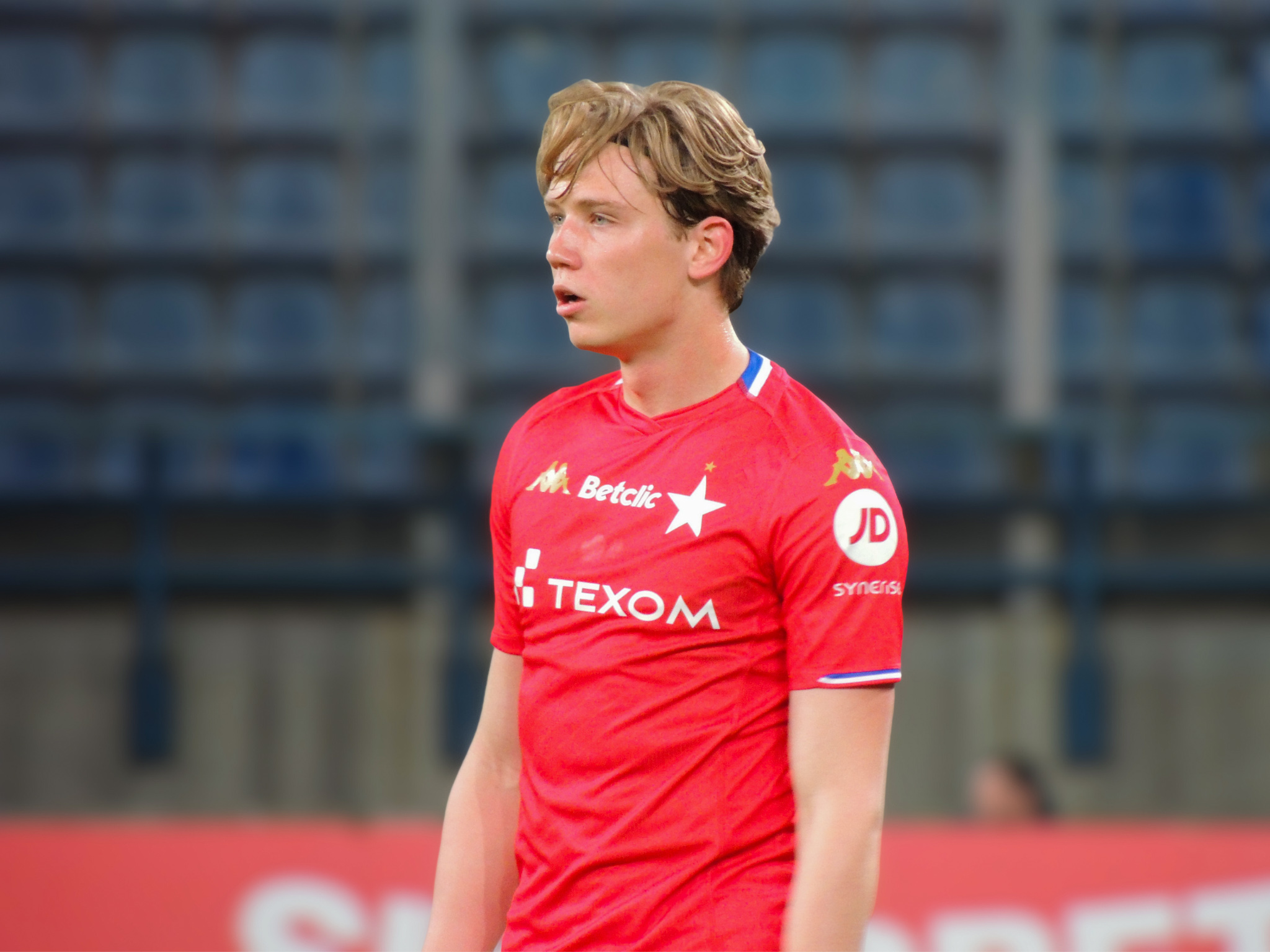
- Krzyżanowski with Wisła Kraków in 2026

Personal information
- Full name: Jakub Bartosz Krzyżanowski
- Date of birth: 19 January 2006 (age 20)
- Place of birth: Kraków, Poland
- Height: 1.81 m (5 ft 11 in)
- Position: Left-back

Team information
- Current team: Wisła Kraków
- Number: 52

Youth career
- –2018: Bronowianka Kraków
- 2018–2023: Wisła Kraków
- 2024–2025: → Torino (loan)

Senior career*
Years	Team	Apps	(Gls)
2023–	Wisła Kraków	63	(2)

International career^{‡}
2021–2022	Poland U16	9	(1)
2022–2023	Poland U17	17	(3)
2023	Poland U18	5	(1)
2024	Poland U19	8	(0)
2025–	Poland U20	5	(0)
2026–	Poland U21	1	(0)
- * Club domestic league appearances and goals as of 14:51, 10 November 2026 (UTC) ‡ National team caps and goals as of 21:27, 13 November 2026 (UTC)

Jakub Bartosz Krzyżanowski (born 19 January 2006) is a Polish professional footballer who plays as a left-back for Ekstraklasa club Wisła Kraków.

== Career ==
=== Wisła Kraków ===
Krzyżanowski started his career with Polish side Wisła Kraków. He made his debut for the club as a substitute in a 0–0 draw against Stal Rzeszów on 5 August 2023. He made two Polish Cup appearances that season, and remained on the bench during the final played on 2 May 2024, as Wisła defeated Pogoń Szczecin 2–1 after extra time.

==== Loan to Torino ====
On 7 August 2024, a week after extending his contract with Wisła until June 2026, Krzyżanowski joined Serie A club Torino on a season-long loan with an option to buy. After spending the season playing for Torino's Primavera squad, he returned to Kraków.

== Style of play ==
He mainly operates as a defender. He was described as "attracted attention with his bold and offensive play".

== International career ==
A youth international, he represented Poland at the 2023 FIFA U-17 World Cup in Indonesia, and appeared in all three games played in the tournament by the Poland U17s.

== Personal life ==
Krzyżanowski practiced judo as a child. He has regarded England international Trent Alexander-Arnold as his football idol. He is a native of the Bronowice district of Kraków.

== Career statistics ==
As of match played 6 November 2026

Appearances and goals by club, season and competition
Club	Season	League			Polish Cup		Europe		Other		Total	
Club	Season	Division	Apps	Goals	Apps	Goals	Apps	Goals	Apps	Goals	Apps	Goals
Wisła Kraków	2023–24	I liga	19	0	2	0	—		—		21	0
Wisła Kraków	2024–25	I liga	0	0	—		1 (Note: Appearance in UEFA Europa League)	0	—		1	0
Wisła Kraków	2025–26	I liga	30	1	2	0	—		—		32	1
Wisła Kraków	2026–27	Ekstraklasa	14	1	1	0	—		—		15	1
Career total			63	2	5	0	1	0	0	0	69	2

== Honours ==
Wisła Kraków

- I liga: 2025–26
- Polish Cup: 2023–24
