= Joseph Colley =

Swedish footballer

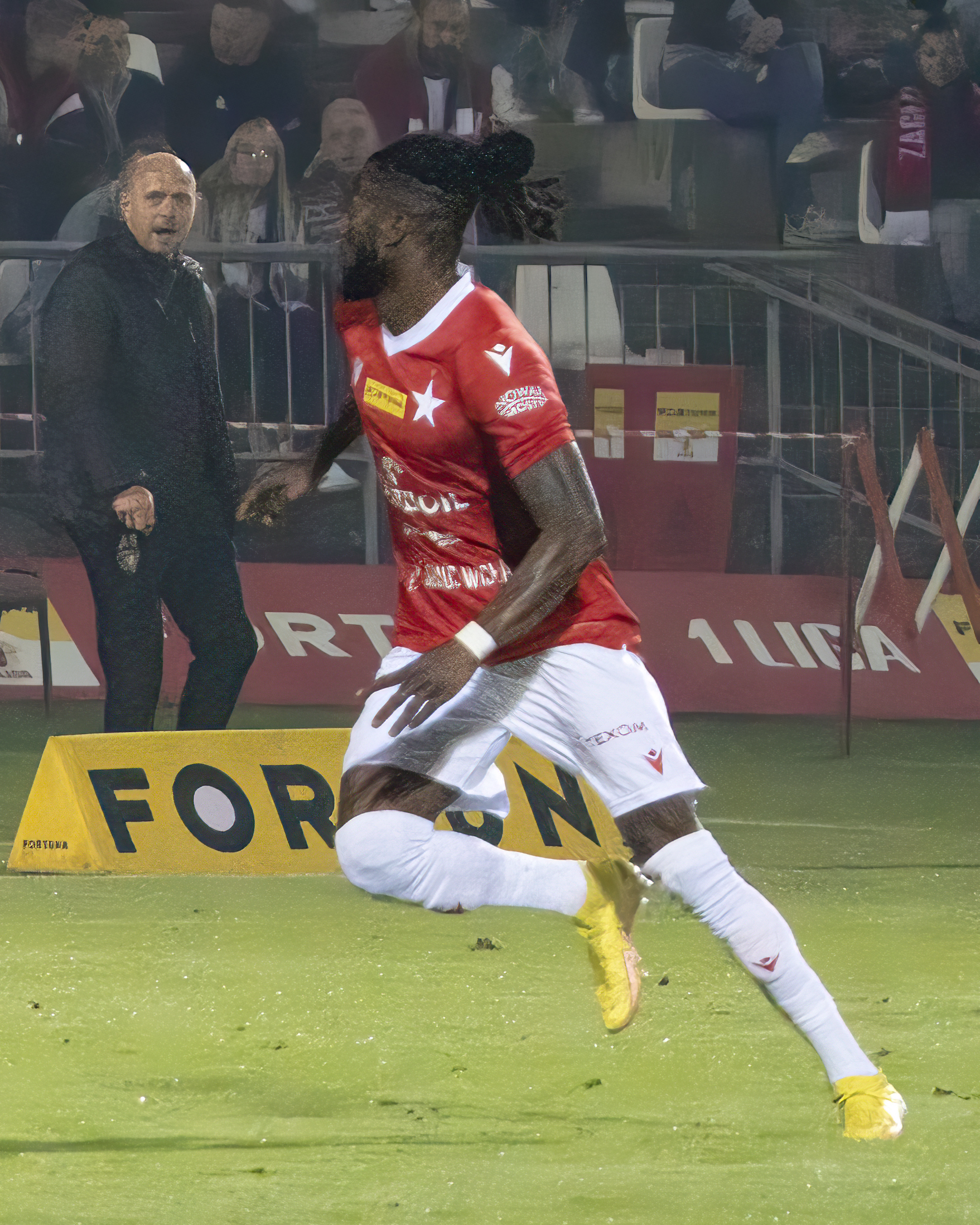
- Colley in 2022 playing for Wisła Kraków

Personal information
- Date of birth: 13 April 1999 (age 27)
- Place of birth: Kanifing, Gambia
- Height: 1.90 m (6 ft 3 in)
- Position: Centre-back

Team information
- Current team: Tirana
- Number: 5

Youth career
- Bro IK
- –2015: IF Brommapojkarna
- 2015–2019: Chelsea

Senior career*
| Years | Team | Apps | (Gls) |
| 2019–2021 | Chievo | 0 | (0) |
| 2021 | → IK Sirius (loan) | 23 | (0) |
| 2022–2026 | Wisła Kraków | 64 | (0) |
| 2025 | Wisła Kraków II | 4 | (1) |
| 2026– | Tirana | 9 | (0) |

International career
| 2014–2016 | Sweden U17 | 27 | (2) |
| 2017–2018 | Sweden U19 | 18 | (1) |
- * Club domestic league appearances and goals as of 16:51, 7 September 2026 (UTC)

Joseph Colley (born 13 April 1999) is a Gambian professional footballer who plays as a centre-back for Kategoria Superiore club Tirana. Having represented Sweden at youth level, he has been called up to the Gambia national team.

== Club career ==
Beginning his footballing career with Bro IK's, IF Brommapojkarna's, and Chelsea's youth academies, Colley signed with Serie B club Chievo in the summer of 2019. In 2021, he joined IK Sirius on loan over the 2021 Allsvenskan season.

On 18 January 2022, he signed a three-and-a-half-year deal with Polish Ekstraklasa club Wisła Kraków. He played the full 120 minutes in a 2–1 victory over Pogoń Szczecin in the 2023–24 Polish Cup final played on 2 May 2024. He departed Wisła in June 2026 upon the expiration of his contract.

== International career ==
Colley has represented the Sweden U17 and U19 teams.

== Personal life ==
Colley was born in Kanifing, Gambia and moved to Sweden in 2008.

== Career statistics ==
As of match played 24 May 2026

Appearances and goals by club, season and competition
| Club | Season | League | | | National cup (Note: Includes Svenska Cupen, Polish Cup) | | League cup | | Europe | | Other | | Total | |
| Club | Season | Division | Apps | Goals | Apps | Goals | Apps | Goals | Apps | Goals | Apps | Goals | Apps | Goals |
|---|---|---|---|---|---|---|---|---|---|---|---|---|---|---|
| Chievo | 2019–20 | Serie B | 0 | 0 | 0 | 0 | — | | — | | — | | 0 | 0 |
| Chievo | 2020–21 | Serie B | 0 | 0 | 0 | 0 | — | | — | | — | | 0 | 0 |
| Chievo | Total | | 0 | 0 | 0 | 0 | — | | — | | — | | 0 | 0 |
| IK Sirius | 2021 | Allsvenskan | 23 | 0 | 1 | 0 | — | | — | | — | | 24 | 0 |
| Wisła Kraków | 2021–22 | Ekstraklasa | 11 | 0 | 1 | 0 | — | | — | | — | | 12 | 0 |
| Wisła Kraków | 2022–23 | I liga | 15 | 0 | 1 | 0 | — | | — | | 1 (Note: Appearance in I liga promotion play-offs) | 0 | 17 | 0 |
| Wisła Kraków | 2023–24 | I liga | 28 | 0 | 5 | 0 | — | | — | | — | | 33 | 0 |
| Wisła Kraków | 2024–25 | I liga | 3 | 0 | 0 | 0 | — | | 4 (Note: Appearances in UEFA Europa League) | 0 | 1 | 0 | 8 | 0 |
| Wisła Kraków | 2025–26 | I liga | 5 | 0 | 3 | 0 | — | | — | | — | | 8 | 0 |
| Wisła Kraków | Total | | 62 | 0 | 10 | 0 | — | | 4 | 0 | 2 | 0 | 78 | 0 |
| Wisła Kraków II | 2024–25 | III liga, gr. IV | 2 | 1 | — | | — | | — | | — | | 2 | 1 |
| Wisła Kraków II | 2025–26 | III liga, gr. IV | 2 | 0 | — | | — | | — | | — | | 2 | 0 |
| Wisła Kraków II | Total | | 4 | 1 | — | | — | | — | | — | | 4 | 1 |
| Career total | | | 89 | 1 | 11 | 0 | — | | 4 | 0 | 2 | 0 | 106 | 1 |

== Honours ==
Chelsea

- UEFA Youth League: 2015–16

Wisła Kraków

- I liga: 2025–26
- Polish Cup: 2023–24
