= Szot =

Szot is a Polish surname. Archaic feminine forms: Szotowa (by husband), Szotówna (by father) Notable people with the surname include:

- Dawid Szot (born 2001), Polish footballer
- Paulo Szot (born 1969), Brazilian operatic baritone singer and actor
- Walt Szot (1920–1981), American football player
