= Marc Carbó =

Spanish footballer (born 1994)

Personal information
- Full name: Marc Carbó Bellapart
- Date of birth: 21 May 1994 (age 32)
- Place of birth: Salt, Spain
- Height: 1.85 m (6 ft 1 in)
- Position: Midfielder

Team information
- Current team: Wisła Kraków
- Number: 8

Youth career
- 2004–2010: Girona
- 2010–2011: Quart
- 2011–2012: Gironès-Sàbat
- 2012–2013: Manlleu

Senior career*
Years	Team	Apps	(Gls)
2013	Manlleu	1	(0)
2013–2014	Cornellà Terri	30	(5)
2014–2015	Farners	31	(3)
2015–2016	Girona B	31	(0)
2016–2017	Peralada	32	(2)
2016	Girona	1	(0)
2017–2018	Llagostera	37	(0)
2018–2020	Badalona	60	(1)
2020–2021	Mérida	23	(1)
2021–2022	San Fernando	35	(3)
2022–2023	Lugo	29	(0)
2023–	Wisła Kraków	84	(2)
- * Club domestic league appearances and goals as of 13:15, 8 November 2026 (UTC)

Marc Carbó Bellapart (born 21 May 1994) is a Spanish professional footballer who plays as a midfielder for Polish club Wisła Kraków.

== Club career ==
Born in Salt, Girona, Catalonia, Carbó finished his formation with AEC Manlleu. He made his senior debut on 19 May 2013, coming on as a late substitute in a 0–3 Tercera División away loss against CF Montañesa.

After being released by the club, Carbó subsequently represented AE Cornellà del Terri and CE Farners in the lower leagues. In July 2015 he joined Girona FC, a club he already represented as a youth, being initially assigned to the reserve team.

On 18 July 2016, Carbó moved to CF Peralada as the club became Girona's new reserve side. On 30 October, he made his professional debut with the Blanquivermells' first team, replacing goalscorer Portu in a 3–0 home win against CD Numancia in the Segunda División.

On 14 July 2017, Carbó agreed to a deal with Segunda División B side UE Llagostera. After suffering relegation, he moved to fellow league team CF Badalona, and was a regular starter during his two-year spell.

On 30 July 2020, Carbó signed for Mérida AD also in the third tier. Roughly one year later, he joined San Fernando CD in the new Primera División RFEF.

On 5 July 2022, he signed a two-year deal with second division side CD Lugo.

On 3 August 2023, Carbó joined nine of his compatriots at Polish second division side Wisła Kraków, with whom he signed a one-year deal with an option for another season, which was exercised in late April 2024. He played the entirety of the 2023–24 Polish Cup final on 2 May, as Wisła defeated Pogoń Szczecin 2–1 after extra time.

== Personal life ==
Carbó's uncle Manuel was also a footballer. A defender, he mainly represented CE Sabadell FC in the second tier.

== Honours ==
Wisła Kraków

- I liga: 2025–26
- Polish Cup: 2023–24
