= Szymon Sobczak =

Polish footballer (born 1992)

Personal information
- Date of birth: 7 December 1992 (age 33)
- Place of birth: Zakopane, Poland
- Height: 1.81 m (5 ft 11 in)
- Position: Striker

Team information
- Current team: Podhale Nowy Targ
- Number: 14

Youth career
- –2008: Wisła Kraków
- 2008–2010: Górnik Zabrze

Senior career*
Years	Team	Apps	(Gls)
2010–2014	Górnik Zabrze	5	(0)
2012–2013	→ Termalica Bruk-Bet (loan)	17	(3)
2013	→ Calisia Kalisz (loan)	12	(6)
2014	→ ROW 1964 Rybnik (loan)	14	(1)
2014–2015	ROW 1964 Rybnik	32	(9)
2015–2016	MKS Kluczbork	14	(1)
2016–2017	Stal Mielec	45	(10)
2017–2018	Podbeskidzie Bielsko-Biała	15	(1)
2018–2019	Stal Mielec	7	(0)
2019–2020	Stomil Olsztyn	46	(14)
2020–2021	Jagiellonia Białystok	1	(0)
2020–2021	Jagiellonia Białystok II	10	(6)
2021–2023	Zagłębie Sosnowiec	77	(27)
2023–2024	Wisła Kraków	30	(7)
2024–2026	Arka Gdynia	41	(13)
2026	Zagłębie Sosnowiec	12	(0)
2026–	Podhale Nowy Targ	0	(0)
- * Club domestic league appearances and goals as of 09:44, 31 May 2026 (UTC)

Szymon Sobczak (born 7 December 1992) is a Polish professional footballer who plays as a striker for II liga club Podhale Nowy Targ.

== Early life ==
Sobczak was born in 1992 in Poland. He is a native of Zakopane, Poland.

== Career ==
Having spent most of his youth career with Wisła Kraków, Sobczak started his senior career with Ekstraklasa club Górnik Zabrze. In 2012, he was sent on loan to I liga club Bruk-Bet Termalica Nieciecza. In 2013, he moved on loan to third-tier outfit Calisia Kalisz. In 2014, he left Górnik on loan again, this time joining ROW 1964 Rybnik, before moving there on a permanent basis following his loan spell. In 2015, he moved to MKS Kluczbork for a brief period, before joining Stal Mielec in early 2016. After spending a year-and-a-half in Mielec, Sobczak moved to Podbeskidzie Bielsko-Biała. In 2018, he returned to Stal. In early 2019, he joined Stomil Olsztyn. In 2020, he signed for Polish side Jagiellonia Białystok. In 2021, he moved to Zagłębie Sosnowiec. He was regarded as one of the club's most important players.

On 30 June 2023, Sobczak returned to his maiden club Wisła Kraków on a one-year deal, with an extension option. Initially a back-up striker, he earned a regular spot in the starting line-up in November, and enjoyed a run of good form the following month, scoring thrice in three league games, which earned him Player of the Month honours.

He was named in the starting line-up for the 2023–24 Polish Cup final against Pogoń Szczecin on 2 May 2024; the game ended with Wisła winning 2–1 after extra time. In the 2023–24 season, he recorded 10 goals and six assists in 35 appearances across all competitions, as Wisła decided not to extend his contract.

On 25 June 2024, he signed a two-year deal with fellow I liga club Arka Gdynia. He scored 13 goals in 33 league appearances as Arka finished the 2024–25 season as champions. After promotion to the Ekstraklasa, he was rarely used and featured mainly as a substitute.

On 19 February 2026, Sobczak terminated his contract with Arka and returned to Zagłębie Sosnowiec on a two-and-a-half-year deal. He stayed goalless in twelve league appearances as Zagłębie suffered relegation to the III liga. He left the club on 3 July 2026.

On 23 July 2026, Sobczak agreed to join II liga side Podhale Nowy Targ.

== Style of play ==
Sobczak mainly operates as a striker. He has been described as a player who "plays well with his head, can go lower to play and shoot from distance".

== Career statistics ==
As of match played 10 May 2026

Appearances and goals by club, season and competition
Club	Season	League			Polish Cup		Other		Total	
Club	Season	Division	Apps	Goals	Apps	Goals	Apps	Goals	Apps	Goals
Górnik Zabrze	2010–11	Ekstraklasa	4	0	1	0	—		5	0
Górnik Zabrze	2011–12	Ekstraklasa	1	0	0	0	—		1	0
Górnik Zabrze	Total		5	0	1	0	—		6	0
Termalica Bruk-Bet (loan)	2012–13	I liga	17	3	2	1	—		19	4
Calisia Kalisz (loan)	2013–14	II liga West	12	6	0	0	—		12	6
ROW 1964 Rybnik (loan)	2013–14	I liga	14	1	—		—		14	1
ROW 1964 Rybnik	2014–15	I liga	32	9	2	1	—		34	10
ROW 1964 Rybnik	Total		46	10	2	1	—		48	11
MKS Kluczbork	2015–16	I liga	14	1	1	0	—		15	1
Stal Mielec	2015–16	II liga	14	5	—		—		14	5
Stal Mielec	2016–17	I liga	31	5	3	3	—		34	8
Stal Mielec	Total		45	10	3	3	—		48	13
Podbeskidzie	2017–18	I liga	15	1	2	1	—		17	2
Stal Mielec	2017–18	I liga	7	0	—		—		7	0
Stomil Olsztyn	2018–19	I liga	13	4	—		—		13	4
Stomil Olsztyn	2019–20	I liga	33	10	3	2	—		36	12
Stomil Olsztyn	Total		46	14	3	2	—		49	16
Jagiellonia Białystok	2020–21	Ekstraklasa	1	0	0	0	—		1	0
Jagiellonia Białystok II	2020–21	III liga, gr. I	10	6	—		—		10	6
Zagłębie Sosnowiec	2020–21	I liga	14	1	—		—		14	1
Zagłębie Sosnowiec	2021–22	I liga	34	17	2	3	—		36	20
Zagłębie Sosnowiec	2022–23	I liga	29	9	2	1	—		31	10
Zagłębie Sosnowiec	Total		77	27	4	4	—		81	31
Wisła Kraków	2023–24	I liga	30	7	5	3	—		35	10
Arka Gdynia	2024–25	I liga	33	13	2	0	—		35	13
Arka Gdynia	2025–26	Ekstraklasa	8	0	1	0	—		9	0
Arka Gdynia	Total		41	13	3	0	—		44	13
Zagłębie Sosnowiec	2025–26	II liga	12	0	—		—		12	0
Podhale Nowy Targ	2026–27	II liga	0	0	0	0	—		0	0
Career total			378	98	26	15	0	0	404	113

== Honours ==
Stal Mielec

- II liga: 2015–16

Wisła Kraków

- Polish Cup: 2023–24

Arka Gdynia

- I liga: 2024–25

Individual

- I liga Player of the Month: December 2023
