= Szymon Bartlewicz =

Polish footballer (born 2005)

Personal information
- Date of birth: 14 November 2005 (age 20)
- Place of birth: Leszno, Poland
- Height: 1.76 m (5 ft 9 in)
- Position: Attacking midfielder

Team information
- Current team: GKS Katowice
- Number: 31

Youth career
- Tęcza-Osa Osieczna
- GKS Krzemieniewo
- 2018–2023: Chrobry Głogów

Senior career*
Years	Team	Apps	(Gls)
2022–2023	Chrobry Głogów II	43	(1)
2023–2026	Chrobry Głogów	94	(12)
2026–	GKS Katowice	2	(1)

International career^{‡}
2023	Poland U19	3	(0)
2025–	Poland U20	2	(3)
- * Club domestic league appearances and goals as of 2 August 2026 ‡ National team caps and goals as of 31 March 2026

Szymon Bartlewicz (born 14 November 2005) is a Polish professional footballer who plays as an attacking midfielder for Ekstraklasa club GKS Katowice.

He previously played for Chrobry Głogów in the I liga and has represented Poland at under-19 and under-20 level.

== Club career ==
=== Chrobry Głogów ===
Bartlewicz was born in Leszno and is from nearby Świerczyna. He began playing football with Tęcza-Osa Osieczna, later joined the youth teams of GKS Krzemieniewo, and moved to the academy of Chrobry Głogów in 2018. Initially used as a winger, he was subsequently moved into central midfield.

He made one I liga appearance for Chrobry's first team during the 2022–23 season. In the 2023–24 season, his first full senior campaign, he scored five goals in 31 league appearances. He followed this with six goals in 29 league matches in the next campaign.

At the beginning of the 2025–26 season, Chrobry coach Łukasz Becella described Bartlewicz as one of the team's intended leaders and confirmed that Ekstraklasa clubs had shown interest in him. Bartlewicz made 31 regular-season league appearances that season and also played in both promotion play-off matches. Chrobry defeated ŁKS Łódź on penalties in the semi-final before losing 2–1 to Wieczysta Kraków in the final; Bartlewicz started both games.

=== GKS Katowice ===
On 2 June 2026, Bartlewicz agreed to join Ekstraklasa club GKS Katowice as a free agent after the expiry of his Chrobry contract. He signed a deal until 30 June 2029, with an option for a further year. His move followed Chrobry's unsuccessful promotion campaign, during which he had attracted interest from more than one top-flight club.

He made his GKS debut on 23 July 2026, replacing Bartosz Nowak in the 84th minute of a 2–1 away defeat to MŠK Žilina in the UEFA Conference League second qualifying round. Three days later, he made his Ekstraklasa debut as a substitute against Wisła Kraków. He scored four minutes after entering the match, although GKS lost 2–1.

== International career ==
Bartlewicz made three appearances for the Poland under-19 team in 2023. He received his first under-20 call-up in October 2025. On 13 October, he came on as a substitute and scored twice in a 4–1 win over Switzerland. He was selected again for under-20 fixtures in March 2026, before being called into the Poland under-21 squad for European Championship qualifiers against Armenia and Montenegro. He remained an unused substitute in both matches.

== Career statistics ==
As of match played 12 August 2026

Appearances and goals by club, season and competition
Club	Season	League			Polish Cup		Europe		Other		Total	
Club	Season	Division	Apps	Goals	Apps	Goals	Apps	Goals	Apps	Goals	Apps	Goals
Chrobry Głogów II	2021–22	IV liga Lower Silesia	11	1	—		—		2 (Note: Appearances in IV liga promotion play-offs)	0	13	1
Chrobry Głogów II	2022–23	III liga, group III	30	0	—		—		—		30	0
Chrobry Głogów II	Total		41	1	—		—		2	0	43	1
Chrobry Głogów	2022–23	I liga	1	0	0	0	—		—		1	0
Chrobry Głogów	2023–24	I liga	31	5	1	1	—		—		32	6
Chrobry Głogów	2024–25	I liga	29	6	1	0	—		—		30	6
Chrobry Głogów	2025–26	I liga	31	1	1	0	—		2 (Note: Appearances in I liga promotion play-offs)	0	34	1
Chrobry Głogów	Total		92	12	3	1	—		2	0	97	13
GKS Katowice	2026–27	Ekstraklasa	2	1	0	0	4 (Note: Appearances in UEFA Europa Conference League)	0	—		6	1
Career total			135	14	3	1	4	0	4	0	146	15

== Honours ==
Chrobry Głogów II

- IV liga Lower Silesia West: 2021–22
