= Joan Román =

Spanish footballer

Goku Román
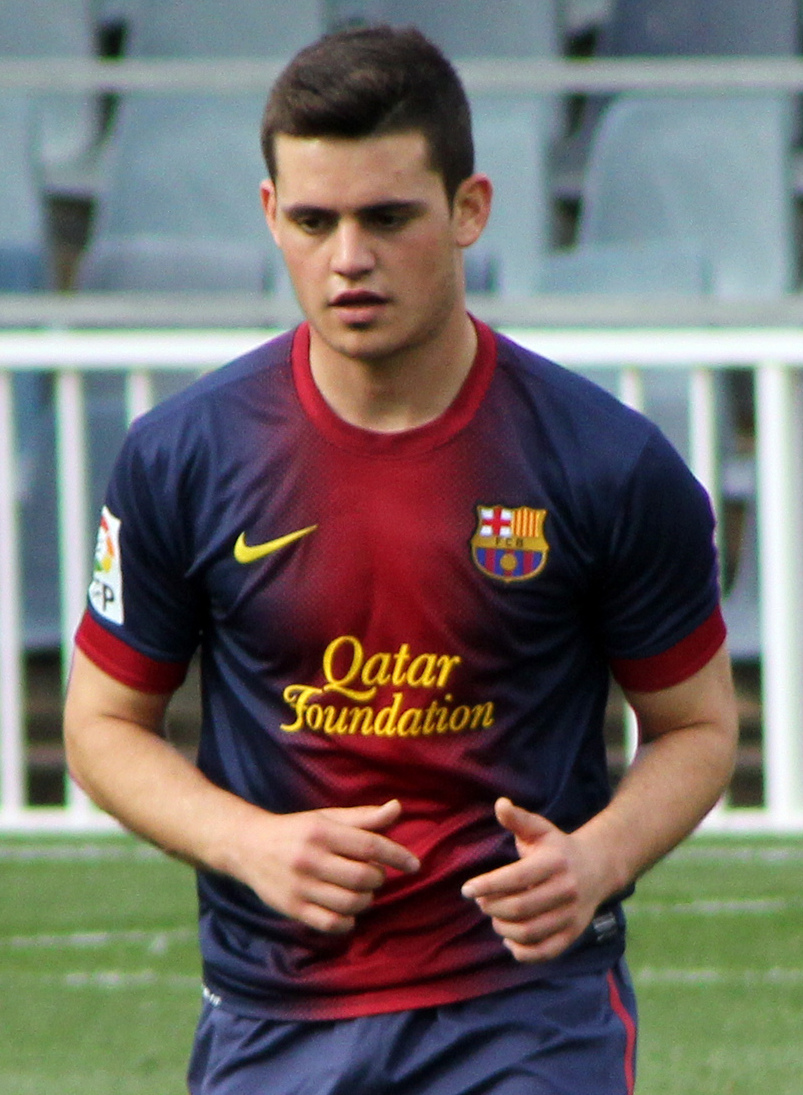
- Román with Barcelona B in 2012

Personal information
- Full name: Joan Ángel Román Ollè
- Date of birth: 18 May 1993 (age 33)
- Place of birth: Reus, Spain
- Height: 1.71 m (5 ft 7 in)
- Positions: Attacking midfielder; winger

Team information
- Current team: Sandecja Nowy Sącz
- Number: 22

Youth career
- 2002–2003: Santes Creus
- 2003–2009: Espanyol
- 2009–2012: Manchester City

Senior career*
Years	Team	Apps	(Gls)
2012–2015	Barcelona B	70	(9)
2014	→ Villarreal (loan)	2	(0)
2015–2018	Braga	6	(1)
2016	→ Nacional (loan)	6	(0)
2016–2017	→ Śląsk Wrocław (loan)	12	(1)
2018–2019	AEL Limassol	16	(4)
2019	Miedź Legnica	12	(5)
2019–2020	Panetolikos	7	(0)
2020–2021	Miedź Legnica	45	(12)
2021–2023	Podbeskidzie	62	(22)
2023–2024	Wisła Kraków	29	(11)
2024–2026	Wieczysta Kraków	30	(11)
2025–2026	Wieczysta Kraków II	4	(2)
2026–	Sandecja Nowy Sącz	0	(0)

International career
2009	Spain U16	3	(2)
- * Club domestic league appearances and goals as of 21:41, 31 May 2026 (UTC)

Joan Ángel Román Ollè (born 18 May 1993), also known as Goku, is a Spanish professional footballer who plays as an attacking midfielder or a winger for II liga club Sandecja Nowy Sącz.

== Club career ==
=== Early years ===
Born in Reus, Tarragona, Catalonia, Román began playing football with local UE Barri Santes Creus before joining the youth ranks of RCD Espanyol at the age of 10. Six years later he signed for Manchester City, playing exclusively with the reserves during his spell and being called up once by the first team, in a 3–2 win against Sporting CP in the round of 16 of the UEFA Europa League where he remained an unused substitute.

=== Barcelona B ===
On 27 June 2012, Román returned to his homeland after signing a three-year contract with FC Barcelona B. He made his professional debut on 8 September away to CD Guadalajara, replacing Sergio Araujo for the final 24 minutes of the 1–0 Segunda División win. In his next game, on 13 October, again off the bench, he scored his first goal to conclude a 3–0 victory over Sporting de Gijón at the Mini Estadi; he made 22 appearances in his first season, also netting on 13 January 2013 in a 4–2 home defeat of Xerez CD within a minute of entering the field of play.

On 31 January 2014, after adding another couple of goals in 16 second-tier matches over the first half of 2013–14, Román was loaned to La Liga side Villarreal CF for the remainder of the campaign. Eight days later he made his debut in the latter competition, playing the final 28 minutes of a 4–2 away loss to Real Madrid in place of Moi Gómez. His only other appearance was on 5 April, starting in a 1–0 defeat at Atlético Madrid.

Román returned to his parent club for 2014–15, playing 32 games en route to an eventual relegation. He totalled five goals over its course, including two on 23 May in a 4–2 away defeat against UD Las Palmas where he featured only 22 minutes.

=== Braga ===
After his contract expired at Barcelona, Román moved to S.C. Braga in Portugal, signing a three-year deal on 28 June 2015. He made his Primeira Liga debut on the first day of the season, scoring the winner in a 2–1 home win over C.D. Nacional seven minutes after coming on.

After playing only six more games in any competition, Román was loaned to Nacional alongside teammate Rodrigo Pinho on 18 January 2016, until the end of the campaign. In August, he moved to Śląsk Wrocław in Poland's Ekstraklasa on the same basis, for the full campaign.

=== Later career ===
Román left Braga in January 2018, joining AEL Limassol until the end of the Cypriot First Division season. Just over a year later, he was back in Poland's top flight with Miedź Legnica. His contract ended following their relegation, and he signed for Panetolikos F.C. of Super League Greece in July 2019.

== Career statistics ==
As of match played 10 May 2026

Appearances and goals by club, season and competition
Club	Season	League			National cup (Note: Includes Taça de Portugal, Polish Cup, Greek Cup)		Continental		Total	
Club	Season	Division	Apps	Goals	Apps	Goals	Apps	Goals	Apps	Goals
Barcelona B	2012–13	Segunda División	22	2	—		—		22	2
Barcelona B	2013–14	Segunda División	16	2	—		—		16	2
Barcelona B	2014–15	Segunda División	32	5	—		—		32	5
Barcelona B	Total		70	9	—		—		70	9
Villarreal (loan)	2013–14	La Liga	2	0	0	0	—		2	0
Braga	2015–16	Primeira Liga	6	1	1	0	0	0	7	1
Nacional (loan)	2015–16	Primeira Liga	6	0	2	0	—		8	0
Śląsk Wrocław (loan)	2016–17	Ekstraklasa	12	1	1	0	—		13	1
AEL Limassol	2017–18	Cypriot First Division	11	2	0	0	—		11	2
AEL Limassol	2018–19	Cypriot First Division	5	2	0	0	—		5	2
AEL Limassol	Total		16	4	0	0	—		16	4
Miedź Legnica	2018–19	Ekstraklasa	12	5	—		—		12	5
Panetolikos	2019–20	Super League Greece	7	0	2	1	—		9	1
Miedź Legnica	2019–20	I liga	15	3	1	0	—		16	3
Miedź Legnica	2020–21	I liga	30	9	1	0	—		31	9
Miedź Legnica	Total		45	12	2	0	—		47	12
Podbeskidzie	2021–22	I liga	31	6	1	0	—		32	6
Podbeskidzie	2022–23	I liga	31	16	1	0	—		32	16
Podbeskidzie	Total		62	22	2	0	—		64	22
Wisła Kraków	2023–24	I liga	29	11	5	0	—		34	11
Wieczysta Kraków	2024–25	II liga	27	10	—		—		27	10
Wieczysta Kraków	2025–26	I liga	3	1	0	0	—		3	1
Wieczysta Kraków	Total		30	11	0	0	—		30	11
Wieczysta Kraków II	2025–26	IV liga Lesser Poland	4	2	—		—		4	2
Sandecja Nowy Sącz	2026–27	II liga	0	0	0	0	—		0	0
Career total			301	78	15	1	0	0	316	79

== Honours ==
Wisła Kraków

- Polish Cup: 2023–24

Wieczysta Kraków II

- IV liga Lesser Poland: 2025–26
