= Jesús Alfaro =

Spanish footballer

Personal information
- Full name: Jesús Alfaro Ligero
- Date of birth: 24 June 1991 (age 35)
- Place of birth: La Palma del Condado, Spain
- Height: 1.70 m (5 ft 7 in)
- Position: Attacking midfielder

Team information
- Current team: Kolding
- Number: 8

Youth career
- Sevilla

Senior career*
Years	Team	Apps	(Gls)
2010–2013	Sevilla B	52	(2)
2010–2011	Sevilla C	17	(6)
2013	Arroyo	18	(1)
2013–2014	Algeciras	38	(12)
2014–2016	Alcoyano	60	(15)
2016–2018	Barcelona B	41	(9)
2018–2019	Zaragoza	4	(0)
2018–2019	→ Murcia (loan)	13	(2)
2019	→ Hércules (loan)	23	(1)
2019–2021	Hércules	42	(1)
2021–2022	Logroñés	36	(3)
2022–2023	Badajoz	36	(2)
2023–2025	Wisła Kraków	60	(6)
2025–	Kolding	23	(1)
- * Club domestic league appearances and goals as of 2 June 2026

Jesús Alfaro Ligero (born 24 June 1991) is a Spanish professional footballer who plays as an attacking midfielder for Danish 1st Division club Kolding.

== Club career ==
Born in La Palma del Condado, Huelva, Andalusia, Alfaro was a Sevilla youth graduate. He made his senior debut with the reserves on 3 January 2010, starting in a 0–0 Segunda División B home draw against Marbella.

On 3 January 2013, after only sparingly for the B-side in the following years, Alfaro terminated his contract and immediately joined fellow third division club Arroyo. He remained in the category in the following four seasons, representing Algeciras, Alcoyano and Barcelona B, achieving promotion to Segunda División with the latter in 2017.

Alfaro made his professional team debut on 28 August 2017, coming on as a substitute for Ferrán Sarsanedas in an 0–3 home loss against Tenerife. The following 17 January, he signed a two-and-a-half-year contract with fellow second division side Real Zaragoza.

On 8 August 2018, Alfaro was loaned to third division club Real Murcia for the season. The following January, he moved to Hércules also in a temporary deal, before signing a permanent contract with the latter club on 11 July 2019.

On 21 June 2023, Alfaro signed for Polish second division club Wisła Kraków on a one-year deal with an extension option, which was exercised in late April 2024. On 2 May, he was named in the starting line-up for the 2023–24 Polish Cup final against Pogoń Szczecin. Alfaro was substituted in the 77th minute, as Wisła went on to win 2–1 after extra time. Alfaro left Wisła upon the expiration of his contract in June 2025.

On 29 July 2025, Alfaro joined Danish 1st Division side Kolding, where he was reunited with his former coach, Albert Rudé.

== Personal life ==
Alfaro's two brothers are also footballers: Juan José (1981), a midfielder, graduated in Barcelona's La Masia, but spent his entire career in Segunda División B or lower. Winger Alejandro (1986) appeared several seasons for Sevilla B, after emerging through the club's youth ranks.

== Honours ==
Wisła Kraków

- Polish Cup: 2023–24
