= Eneko Satrústegui =

Spanish footballer

Personal information
- Full name: Eneko Satrústegui Plano
- Date of birth: 25 September 1990 (age 36)
- Place of birth: Pamplona, Spain
- Height: 1.87 m (6 ft 2 in)
- Position: Defender

Team information
- Current team: NorthEast United

Youth career
- Osasuna

Senior career*
Years	Team	Apps	(Gls)
2009–2012	Osasuna B	23	(2)
2009–2010	→ Izarra (loan)	26	(0)
2011–2014	Osasuna	10	(0)
2012–2013	→ Numancia (loan)	14	(0)
2014–2016	Murcia	31	(0)
2016–2017	Ebro	36	(0)
2017–2018	Lleida Esportiu	35	(0)
2018–2021	Castellón	81	(2)
2021–2023	Racing Santander	60	(0)
2023–2024	Wisła Kraków	15	(1)
2024–2026	Cultural Leonesa	39	(2)
2026–	NorthEast United	5	(0)
- * Club domestic league appearances and goals as of 5 November 2026

Eneko Satrústegui Plano (born 25 September 1990) is a Spanish professional footballer who plays as a left-back or a central defender for Indian Super League club NorthEast United.

== Club career ==
Born in Pamplona, Navarre, Satrústegui's first professional club was local CD Izarra, to which he was loaned by neighbours CA Osasuna. He played with the team in the 2009–10 season, appearing regularly but being relegated from the Segunda División B.

Satrústegui returned to Osasuna in the summer of 2010, being assigned to the B side also in the third tier. On 6 November 2011 he made his La Liga debut, starting in a 7–1 away defeat against Real Madrid and being sent off in the match.

In his second appearance with the main squad, a 2–1 win at RCD Espanyol on 27 November 2011, Satrústegui also played from the start and was red-carded again, thus becoming the first player to be sent off in his first two games in the Spanish top flight. On 5 July of the following year, he was loaned to Segunda División's CD Numancia in a season-long deal, featuring scarcely due to an anterior cruciate ligament injury.

Satrústegui returned to Osasuna in the 2013 off-season, appearing in only two Copa del Rey matches during the whole campaign, which ended in relegation. In August 2014 he rejected a contract offer from the club, and moved to Real Murcia CF of the third division the following month.

Satrústegui alternated between the second and third tiers the following seasons, with CD Ebro, Lleida Esportiu, CD Castellón and Racing de Santander. On 7 December 2020, while in service of the third team, he scored the first of two career goals in the second division, but in a 3–1 away loss to RCD Mallorca.

On 4 July 2023, aged 32, Satrústegui signed for Polish I liga side Wisła Kraków on a one-year deal, with an extension option. On 2 May 2024, he scored in the 100th minute of the final of the Polish Cup against Pogoń Szczecin, sending the game to extra time in an eventual 2–1 victory in Warsaw. Later that month, it was announced he would be released in June.

On 24 July 2024, Satrústegui moved to Cultural y Deportiva Leonesa on a one-year contract with an optional additional year. The 35-year-old went abroad again in July 2026, signing for Indian Super League's NorthEast United FC.

== Honours ==
Racing Santander

- Primera División RFEF: 2021–22

Wisła Kraków

- Polish Cup: 2023–24
