= Arkadiusz Najemski =

Polish footballer

Personal information
- Date of birth: 12 January 1996 (age 30)
- Place of birth: Warsaw, Poland
- Height: 1.79 m (5 ft 10 in)
- Position: Centre-back

Team information
- Current team: Warta Poznań
- Number: 18

Youth career
- –2013: Legia Warsaw

Senior career*
Years	Team	Apps	(Gls)
2013–2017	Legia Warsaw II	34	(0)
2016–2017	→ Zagłębie Sosnowiec (loan)	24	(2)
2017–2018	Zagłębie Sosnowiec	3	(0)
2018	Legia Warsaw II	11	(1)
2018–2020	Wigry Suwałki	45	(5)
2020	GKS Bełchatów	9	(0)
2021–2026	Motor Lublin	109	(6)
2026–	Warta Poznań	0	(0)

International career
2010	Poland U15	4	(0)
2012	Poland U16	4	(0)
2012–2013	Poland U17	9	(0)
2013	Poland U18	2	(0)
- * Club domestic league appearances and goals as of 21:35, 29 May 2026 (UTC)

Arkadiusz Najemski (born 12 January 1996) is a Polish professional footballer who plays as a centre-back for I liga club Warta Poznań.

== Club career ==
Najemski made his I liga debut for Zagłębie Sosnowiec on 6 August 2016 in a game against Pogoń Siedlce.

On 10 August 2020, he joined GKS Bełchatów on a one-year contract.

== Career statistics ==
As of match played 23 May 2026

Appearances and goals by club, season and competition
Club	Season	League			Polish Cup		Other		Total	
Club	Season	Division	Apps	Goals	Apps	Goals	Apps	Goals	Apps	Goals
Legia Warsaw II	2014–15	III liga, group A	7	0	—		—		7	0
Legia Warsaw II	2015–16	III liga, group A	27	0	—		—		27	0
Legia Warsaw II	Total		34	0	—		—		34	0
Zagłębie Sosnowiec (loan)	2016–17	I liga	24	2	0	0	—		24	2
Zagłębie Sosnowiec	2017–18	I liga	3	0	1	0	—		4	0
Zagłębie Sosnowiec	Total		27	2	1	0	—		28	2
Legia Warsaw II	2017–18	III liga, group I	11	1	—		—		11	1
Wigry Suwałki	2018–19	I liga	26	2	2	0	—		28	2
Wigry Suwałki	2019–20	I liga	19	3	0	0	—		19	3
Wigry Suwałki	Total		45	5	2	0	—		47	5
GKS Bełchatów	2020–21	I liga	9	0	1	0	—		10	0
Motor Lublin	2020–21	II liga	2	0	—		—		2	0
Motor Lublin	2021–22	II liga	15	1	0	0	2 (Note: Appearance(s) in II liga promotion play-offs)	0	17	1
Motor Lublin	2022–23	II liga	16	1	2	0	1	0	19	1
Motor Lublin	2023–24	I liga	27	3	2	0	2 (Note: Appearances in I liga promotion play-offs)	0	31	3
Motor Lublin	2024–25	Ekstraklasa	27	1	0	0	—		27	1
Motor Lublin	2025–26	Ekstraklasa	17	0	0	0	—		17	0
Motor Lublin	Total		104	6	4	0	5	0	113	6
Warta Poznań	2026–27	I liga	0	0	0	0	—		0	0
Career total			230	14	8	0	5	0	243	14
