= Maksymilian Banaszewski =

Polish professional footballer

Personal information
- Full name: Maksymilian Banaszewski
- Date of birth: 22 March 1995 (age 31)
- Place of birth: Warsaw, Poland
- Height: 1.73 m (5 ft 8 in)
- Position: Winger

Team information
- Current team: Chełmianka Chełm
- Number: 22

Youth career
- Hutnik Warsaw
- Varsovia Warsaw
- 2006–2008: Marymont Warsaw
- 2009–2011: Unia Warsaw

Senior career*
Years	Team	Apps	(Gls)
2012–2017	Znicz Pruszków	159	(11)
2017–2019	Stal Mielec	52	(7)
2019	Arka Gdynia	8	(0)
2019–2020	Arka Gdynia II	13	(7)
2020–2021	Chrobry Głogów	44	(8)
2021–2023	Zagłębie Sosnowiec	57	(6)
2023–2024	Podbeskidzie	32	(1)
2024–2025	Odra Opole	16	(0)
2025–	Chełmianka Chełm	21	(2)
- * Club domestic league appearances and goals as of 10:04, 4 June 2026 (UTC)

Maksymilian Banaszewski (born 22 March 1995) is a Polish professional footballer who plays as a winger for III liga club Chełmianka Chełm.
