= Poland national under-21 football team =

National under-21 football team of Poland

Poland Under-21
- Nickname(s): Biało-czerwoni (The White and Reds); Białe Orły (The White Eagles)
- Association: Polish Football Association (Polski Związek Piłki Nożnej)
- Confederation: UEFA (Europe)
- Head coach: Jerzy Brzęczek
- Most caps: Arkadiusz Głowacki (32)
- Top scorer: Dawid Kownacki (15)
First colours	Second colours

European Under-21 Championship
- Appearances: 8 (first in 1982)
- Best result: Quarter-finals (1982, 1984, 1986, 1992, 1994)

The Poland national under-21 football team (Polish: Reprezentacja Polski U-21 w piłce nożnej) is the national under-21 football team of Poland and is controlled by the Polish Football Association.

This team is for Polish players aged 21 or under at the start of a two-year European Under-21 Championship campaign, so players can be, and often are, up to 23 years old.

The performance of Poland in the U-21 Euro is used to decide if Poland can qualify for the Summer Olympics. Since the team's foundation, Poland only managed to qualify once, the 1992 Summer Olympics due to having the best coefficence point among losing quarter-finalists in the 1992 UEFA European Under-21 Championship, but managed to finish second in the tournament.

== Competitive record ==
*Denotes draws include knockout matches decided on penalty kicks.
Gold background colour indicates that the tournament was won.
Silver background colour indicates second place finish.
Bronze background colour indicates third place finish.
Red border color indicates tournament was held on home soil.

=== UEFA European U-21 Championship ===
UEFA European Under-21 Championship record
Year	Round	Pld	W	D *	L	GF	GA
1978	did not qualify						
1980	did not qualify						
1982	Quarter-finals	2	0	1	1	3	4
1984	Quarter-finals	2	0	1	1	3	6
1986	Quarter-finals	2	1	0	1	1	5
1988	did not qualify						
1990	did not qualify						
1992	Quarter-finals	2	0	1	1	1	6
(France) 1994	Quarter-finals	2	0	0	2	1	5
(Spain) 1996	did not qualify						
(Romania) 1998	did not qualify						
(Slovakia) 2000	did not qualify						
(Switzerland) 2002	did not qualify						
(Germany) 2004	did not qualify						
(Portugal) 2006	did not qualify						
(Netherlands) 2007	did not qualify						
(Sweden) 2009	did not qualify						
(Denmark) 2011	did not qualify						
(Israel) 2013	did not qualify						
(Czech Republic) 2015	did not qualify						
(Poland) 2017	Group stage	3	0	1	2	3	7
(Italy) (San Marino) 2019	Group stage	3	2	0	1	4	7
(Hungary) (Slovenia) 2021	did not qualify						
(Romania) (Georgia (country)) 2023	did not qualify						
(Slovakia) 2025	Group stage	3	0	0	3	2	11
(Albania) (Serbia) 2027	Qualified						
Total	Quarter-finals	19	3	4	12	18	51

== Results and fixtures ==
The following is a list of match results from the last 12 months, as well as any future matches that have been scheduled.

Win Draw Loss Fixture

27 March 2026 2027 UEFA Euro qualifying	Poland	4–1	Armenia	Stadion im. Braci Czachorów, Radom
18:00 CET (UTC+01:00)	Reguła 43'; Kozubal 48' (pen.), 78' (pen.); Mikołajewski 90+1'	UEFA	Hakobyan 69' (pen.)	Attendance: 13,007; Referee: Vitālijs Spasjoņņikovs (Latvia)

31 March 2026 2027 UEFA Euro qualifying	Montenegro	0–1	Poland	Stadion Tuško Polje, Tuzi, Montenegro
14:00 CEST (UTC+02:00)		UEFA	Krajewski 37'	Attendance: 330; Referee: Alexandros Tsakalidis (Greece)

30 September 2026 2027 UEFA Euro qualifying	Poland	3–0	Sweden	Arena Katowice, Katowice
18:00 CEST (UTC+02:00)	Mazurek 41', 58'; Bąk 90+1'	UEFA		Attendance: 5,237; Referee: Danilo Nikolić (Serbia)

5 October 2026 2027 UEFA Euro qualifying	Italy	6–2	Poland	Stadio Adriatico – Giovanni Cornacchia, Pescara, Italy
18:15 CEST (UTC+02:00)	Koleosho 16'; Ndour 27', 54'; Lipani 59'; Fini 66'; Cherubini 86'	UEFA	Mikołajewski 65'; Żewłakow 85'	Referee: Florian Badstübner (Germany)

13 November 2026 Friendly	Poland	2–0	Norway	Pinatar Arena, San Pedro del Pinatar, Spain
17:30 CET (UTC+01:00)	Pieńko 43'; Duda 46'	PZPN

17 November 2026 Friendly	Poland	1–0	Serbia	Pinatar Arena, San Pedro del Pinatar, Spain
18:00 CET (UTC+01:00)	Pieńko 3'	PZPN		Referee: Juan Antonio Campos Salinas (Spain)

== Players ==
=== Current squad ===
Players born in or after 2004 are eligible for the 2027 UEFA European Under-21 Championship.

The following players were selected for the friendly matches against Norway and Serbia on 13 and 17 November 2026.

Caps and goals updated as of 17 November 2026 after the match against Serbia. Names in italics denote players who have been capped for the senior team.

No.	Pos.	Player	Date of birth (age)	Caps	Goals	Club
1	GK	Marcel Łubik	19 May 2004 (age 22)	8	0	(Polish Football Association) Wisła Kraków
12	GK	Axel Holewiński	22 February 2006 (age 20)	0	0	(Polish Football Association) Lechia Gdańsk
22	GK	Oliwier Zych	28 June 2004 (age 22)	2	0	(Portuguese Football Federation) Vitória de Guimarães
2	DF	Igor Drapiński	31 May 2004 (age 22)	10	0	(Turkish Football Federation) Samsunspor
3	DF	Michał Gurgul	30 January 2006 (age 20)	13	0	(Polish Football Association) Lech Poznań
4	DF	Miłosz Matysik	26 April 2004 (age 22)	18	2	(Cyprus Football Association) Aris Limassol
6	DF	Nikodem Leśniak-Paduch	12 January 2006 (age 20)	1	0	(Polish Football Association) Ruch Chorzów
13	DF	Filip Luberecki	25 April 2005 (age 21)	7	0	(Polish Football Association) Motor Lublin
16	DF	Jakub Krzyżanowski	19 January 2006 (age 20)	1	0	(Polish Football Association) Wisła Kraków
19	DF	Marcel Krajewski	21 October 2004 (age 22)	10	2	(Polish Football Association) Widzew Łódź
7	MF	Mateusz Szczepaniak	5 January 2007 (age 19)	2	0	(Polish Football Association) Legia Warsaw
8	MF	Mateusz Kowalczyk	16 April 2004 (age 22)	13	0	(Polish Football Association) GKS Katowice
10	MF	Tomasz Pieńko (captain)	5 January 2004 (age 22)	27	8	(Polish Football Association) Raków Częstochowa
11	MF	Dawid Drachal	31 January 2005 (age 21)	10	0	(Polish Football Association) Jagiellonia Białystok
14	MF	Maxi Oyedele	7 November 2004 (age 22)	6	0	(French Football Federation) Strasbourg
15	MF	Filip Kocaba	13 November 2004 (age 22)	12	1	(Polish Football Association) Zagłębie Lubin
17	MF	Eryk Kozłowski	27 September 2006 (age 20)	2	0	(Polish Football Association) Jagiellonia Białystok
18	MF	Kacper Duda	1 January 2004 (age 22)	13	1	(Polish Football Association) Wisła Kraków
21	MF	Wojciech Urbański	12 January 2005 (age 21)	7	0	(Polish Football Association) Legia Warsaw
23	MF	Antoni Kozubal (vice-captain)	18 August 2004 (age 22)	19	4	(Polish Football Association) Lech Poznań
9	FW	Daniel Mikołajewski	24 January 2006 (age 20)	6	2	(Swiss Football Association) Luzern
20	FW	Daniel Bąk	10 October 2006 (age 20)	4	1	(Polish Football Association) Korona Kielce

=== Recent call-ups ===
The following players (born in 2004 or later) have previously been called up to the Poland under-21 squad in the last 12 months and are still eligible to represent:

Pos.	Player	Date of birth (age)	Caps	Goals	Club	Latest call-up
GK	Maciej Kikolski	23 February 2004 (age 22)	0	0	(Poland) GKS Katowice	v. Italy, 5 October 2026
GK	Sławomir Abramowicz	9 June 2004 (age 22)	4	0	(Poland) Jagiellonia Białystok	v. Sweden, 30 September 2026 ^{SEN}
DF	Filip Koperski	24 February 2004 (age 22)	1	0	(Poland) Radomiak Radom	v. Serbia, 17 November 2026 ^{INJ}
DF	Bright Ede	18 February 2007 (age 19)	2	0	(Spain) Deportivo A Coruña	v. Italy, 5 October 2026
DF	Wojciech Mońka	18 January 2007 (age 19)	2	0	(Poland) Lech Poznań	v. Italy, 5 October 2026
DF	Kacper Potulski	19 October 2007 (age 19)	2	0	(Germany) Mainz 05	v. Montenegro, 31 March 2026
MF	Bartosz Mazurek	3 January 2007 (age 19)	2	2	(Austria) Red Bull Salzburg	v. Italy, 5 October 2026
MF	Jakub Żewłakow	2 December 2006 (age 19)	2	1	(Poland) Legia Warsaw	v. Italy, 5 October 2026
MF	Kamil Jakubczyk	10 August 2004 (age 22)	1	0	(Poland) Korona Kielce	v. Italy, 5 October 2026
MF	Dariusz Stalmach	8 December 2005 (age 20)	1	0	(Germany) Werder Bremen	v. Italy, 5 October 2026
MF	Marcel Reguła	26 October 2006 (age 20)	7	2	(Poland) Zagłębie Lubin	v. Sweden, 30 September 2026 ^{SEN}
MF	Oskar Kubiak	25 September 2006 (age 20)	0	0	(Czech Republic) Slavia Prague	v. Sweden, 30 September 2026 ^{INJ}
MF	Wiktor Nowak	20 September 2004 (age 22)	6	0	(Czech Republic) Slavia Prague	v. Montenegro, 31 March 2026
MF	Kacper Urbański	7 September 2004 (age 22)	5	1	(Poland) Górnik Zabrze	v. Montenegro, 31 March 2026
MF	Maciej Kuziemka	19 March 2006 (age 20)	4	1	(Poland) Wisła Kraków	v. Montenegro, 31 March 2026
MF	Szymon Bartlewicz	14 November 2005 (age 21)	0	0	(Poland) GKS Katowice	v. Montenegro, 31 March 2026
MF	Jan Faberski	22 April 2006 (age 20)	6	0	(Netherlands) Jong Ajax	v. Montenegro, 31 March 2026 ^{INJ}
^{WD} Withdrew from the squad.^{INJ} Withdrew from the squad due to an injury.^{SEN} Withdrew due to a call up to the senior team.

== Coaching history ==
Note: List is not complete

- 1972–1974 – Andrzej Strejlau
- 1974–1975 – Ryszard Kulesza (U-21)
- 1975–1978 – Ryszard Kulesza (U-23)
- 1979–1982 – Waldemar Obrębski
- 1983–1986 – Edmund Zientara
- 1987–1989 – Bogusław Hajdas
- 1990–1992 – Janusz Wójcik
- 1992–1994 – Wiktor Stasiuk
- 1994–1995 – Mieczysław Broniszewski
- 1996–1997 – Edward Lorens
- 1998–1999 – Paweł Janas
- 2000–2001 – Lesław Ćmikiewicz
- 2002–2003 – Edward Klejndinst
- 2004–2005 – Władysław Żmuda
- 2006–2010 – Andrzej Zamilski
- 2011–2012 – Stefan Majewski
- 2013–2017 – Marcin Dorna
- 2017–2020 – Czesław Michniewicz
- 2020–2022 – Maciej Stolarczyk
- 2022–2023 – Michał Probierz
- 2023–2025 – Adam Majewski
- 2025–present – Jerzy Brzęczek

== Honours ==
=== Friendly ===
- Fajr International Tournament
  - Champions: 1986

== See also ==
- Poland national football team
- Poland Olympic football team
- Poland national under-20 football team
- Poland national under-19 football team
- Poland national under-18 football team
- Poland national under-17 football team
- Poland national under-16 football team
