= Dawid Ryndak =

Polish footballer (born 1989)

Personal information
- Date of birth: 12 March 1989 (age 37)
- Place of birth: Dynów, Poland
- Height: 1.77 m (5 ft 10 in)
- Position: Midfielder

Team information
- Current team: Zagłębie Sosnowiec (fitness coach)

Senior career*
Years	Team	Apps	(Gls)
2008–2013	Zagłębie Sosnowiec	51	(3)
2010	→ Orzeł Balin (loan)		
2011	→ Skałka Żabnica (loan)	12	(5)
2013	Ząbkovia Ząbki	3	(0)
2014	Legionovia Legionowo	16	(6)
2014–2017	Zagłębie Sosnowiec	76	(6)
2017–2019	Puszcza Niepołomice	50	(4)
2019–2024	Zagłębie Sosnowiec	87	(0)
2019–2026	Zagłębie Sosnowiec II	63	(3)
- * Club domestic league appearances and goals

Dawid Ryndak (born 12 March 1989) is a Polish former professional footballer who played as a right midfielder. He currently serves as a fitness coach of Zagłębie Sosnowiec.

== Honours ==
Zagłębie Sosnowiec II

- Regional league Silesia IV: 2021–22
- Polish Cup (Sosnowiec regionals): 2023–24, 2024–25
