= Dawid Szot =

Polish footballer

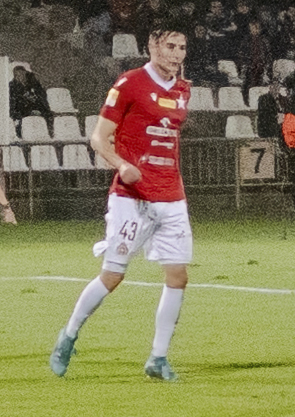
- Szot in 2022 with Wisła Kraków

Personal information
- Full name: Dawid Szot
- Date of birth: 29 April 2001 (age 25)
- Place of birth: Kraków, Poland
- Height: 1.83 m (6 ft 0 in)
- Position: Defender

Team information
- Current team: Chojniczanka Chojnice
- Number: 43

Youth career
- Hutnik Nowa Huta
- 2012–2018: Progres Kraków
- 2018–2019: Wisła Kraków

Senior career*
Years	Team	Apps	(Gls)
2019–2025	Wisła Kraków II	15	(2)
2019–2025	Wisła Kraków	81	(3)
2025–2026	Zagłębie Sosnowiec	28	(1)
2026–	Chojniczanka Chojnice	0	(0)
- * Club domestic league appearances and goals as of 09:37, 31 May 2026 (UTC)

Dawid Szot (born 29 April 2001) is a Polish professional footballer who plays as a defender for II liga club Chojniczanka Chojnice.

== Club career ==
Szot started his career with Wisła Kraków. On 2 May 2024, he played the full 120 minutes of a 2–1 victory over Pogoń Szczecin in the 2023–24 Polish Cup final on 2 May 2024, as Wisła became only the fifth team to win the competition while playing in the second division. On 16 June 2025, Wisła announced they would not extend Szot's contract beyond the 2024–25 season.

On 14 July 2025, Szot signed a two-year deal with II liga club Zagłębie Sosnowiec. On 3 July 2026, his contract was terminated.

On 16 September 2026, Szot joined II side Chojniczanka Chojnice on a deal until the end of the season, with an option to extend.

== Honours ==
Wisła Kraków

- Polish Cup: 2023–24
