= 2023–24 Polish Cup =

Fortuna Puchar Polski

Tournament details
- Country: Poland
- Dates: 2 August 2023 – 2 May 2024
- Teams: 70

Final positions
- Champions: Wisła Kraków (5th title)
- Runners-up: Pogoń Szczecin
- UEFA Europa League: Wisła Kraków

Tournament statistics
- Matches played: 69
- Goals scored: 233 (3.38 per match)
- Top goal scorer(s): Martin Remacle; Ángel Rodado (4 goals each)

The 2023–24 Polish Cup (Polish: Puchar Polski [ˌpuxar ˈpɔlskʲi]) was the 70th season of the annual Polish football knockout tournament. The competition began on 2 August 2023 with the preliminary round the first of seven rounds and ended on 2 May 2024 with the final match at the Stadion Narodowy in Warsaw. The Polish Cup is considered the second-most important club title in Polish football after the Ekstraklasa championship. The competition is organised by the Polish Football Association (PZPN). The Polish Cup is sponsored by Fortuna, making the official name Fortuna Puchar Polski. The winners were assured a place in the first qualifying round of the 2024–25 UEFA Europa League.

The defending champions Legia Warsaw were knocked out in the round of 16 by Korona Kielce. In the final, Wisła Kraków defeated Pogoń Szczecin 2–1 after extra time, winning their fifth title and becoming the fifth second-division club to win the competition. The last time it happened was in the 1995–96 season.

== Participating teams ==
Teams starting the competition from Round of 32	Teams starting the competition from First round			Teams starting the competition from Preliminary round	
2022–23 Ekstraklasa; 4 teams (teams participating in 2023–24 UEFA club competitions)	2022–23 Ekstraklasa; 14 teams (teams not participating in 2023–24 UEFA club competitions)	2022–23 I liga 16 teams (from position 1–16)	Winners of 16 regional cup competitions 16 teams	2022–23 I liga 2 teams (from position 17–18)	2022–23 II liga 18 teams
Raków Częstochowa; Legia Warsaw; Lech Poznań; Pogoń Szczecin	Piast Gliwice; Górnik Zabrze; Cracovia; Warta Poznań; Zagłębie Lubin; Radomiak Radom; Stal Mielec; Widzew Łódź; Korona Kielce; Jagiellonia Białystok; Śląsk Wrocław; Wisła Płock; Lechia Gdańsk; Miedź Legnica	ŁKS Łódź; Ruch Chorzów; Bruk-Bet Termalica Nieciecza; Wisła Kraków; Puszcza Niepołomice; Stal Rzeszów; Podbeskidzie Bielsko-Biała; Arka Gdynia; Chrobry Głogów; GKS Katowice; Zagłębie Sosnowiec; Górnik Łęczna; GKS Tychy; Resovia Rzeszów; Odra Opole; Skra Częstochowa	Miedź Legnica II (dolnośląskie); Zawisza Bydgoszcz (kujawsko-pomorskie); Start Krasnystaw (lubelskie); Carina Gubin (lubuskie); Unia Skierniewice (łódzkie); Wieczysta Kraków (małopolskie); Legia Warsaw II (mazowieckie); Stal Brzeg (opolskie); Stal Stalowa Wola (podkarpackie); Jagiellonia Białystok II (podlaskie); Gryf Wejherowo (pomorskie); Polonia Bytom (śląskie); KSZO Ostrowiec Świętokrzyski (świętokrzyskie); Concordia Elbląg (warmińsko-mazurskie); Sokół Kleczew (wielkopolskie); Pogoń Szczecin II (zachodniopomorskie)	Chojniczanka Chojnice; Sandecja Nowy Sącz	Polonia Warsaw; Znicz Pruszków; Kotwica Kołobrzeg; Stomil Olsztyn; Wisła Puławy; Motor Lublin; KKS 1925 Kalisz; Pogoń Siedlce; Olimpia Elbląg; GKS Jastrzębie; Lech Poznań II; Hutnik Kraków; Radunia Stężyca; Zagłębie Lubin II; Górnik Polkowice; Siarka Tarnobrzeg; Garbarnia Kraków; Śląsk Wrocław II

== Prize money ==
The PZPN Board of Directors determined the size of the prizes.

Round reached	Amount
First round	regional cup winner: 40,000 PLN remainder teams: 15,000 PLN
Round of 32	45,000 PLN
Round of 16	90,000 PLN
Quarter-finals	190,000 PLN
Semi-finals	380,000 PLN
Final	760,000 PLN
Winner	5,000,000 PLN

== Round and draw dates ==
Round	Draw date	Number of teams	Date of matches	Teams entered for the competition
Preliminary round	None	70 → 60	2–10 August 2023	• 2022–23 I liga teams from positions 17–18, • 2022–23 II liga teams.
First round	11 August 2023	60 → 32	19–28 September 2023	• 2022–23 Ekstraklasa teams not participating in 2023–24 UEFA club competitions, • 2022–23 I liga teams from positions 1–16, • 16 winners of the regional cups.
Round of 32	29 September 2023	32 → 16	31 October – 8 November 2023	• 2022–23 Ekstraklasa teams participating in 2023–24 UEFA club competitions.
Round of 16	10 November 2023	16 → 8	5–7 December 2023	None
Quarter-finals	8 December 2023	8 → 4	27–28 February 2024	None
Semi-finals	1 March 2024	4 → 2	2–4 April 2024	None
Final	None	2	2 May 2024	None

== Preliminary round ==
The matches were played on 2–10 August 2023. Participating in this round were the 2 lowest ranked teams from 2022–23 I liga (which finished 2022–23 season on positions 17–18) and 18 teams from the 2022–23 II liga. With reference to the competition regulations, the matches were played according to the following scheme:

- 17th team of 2022–23 I liga season will be a host of match against 18th team of 2022–23 II liga season,
- 18th team of I liga season will be a host of match against 17th team of II liga season,
- 1st team of II liga season will be a host of match against 16th team of II liga season,
- 2nd team of II liga season will be a host of match against 15th team of II liga season,
- 3rd team of II liga season will be a host of match against 14th team of II liga season,
- 4th team of II liga season will be a host of match against 13th team of II liga season,
- 5th team of II liga season will be a host of match against 12th team of II liga season,
- 6th team of II liga season will be a host of match against 11th team of II liga season,
- 7th team of II liga season will be a host of match against 10th team of II liga season,
- 8th team of II liga season will be a host of match against 9th team of II liga season.

Team 1	Score	Team 2
2 August 2023
Kotwica Kołobrzeg (3)	2–1	Zagłębie II Lubin (3)
8 August 2023
Znicz Pruszków (2)	4–1	Górnik Polkowice (4)
KKS 1925 Kalisz (3)	1–1 (a.e.t.) (3–0 p)	GKS Jastrzębie (3)
9 August 2023
Pogoń Siedlce (3)	2–1	Olimpia Elbląg (3)
Sandecja Nowy Sącz (3)	1–2	Garbarnia Kraków (4)
Stomil Olsztyn (3)	1–2	Radunia Stężyca (3)
Wisła Puławy (3)	2–0	Hutnik Kraków (3)
Chojniczanka Chojnice (3)	2–0	Śląsk Wrocław II (4)
Motor Lublin (2)	1–0	Lech Poznań II (3)
10 August 2023
Polonia Warsaw (2)	3–2	Siarka Tarnobrzeg (4)

== First round ==
The draw for this round was conducted in the headquarter of Polish Football Association on 11 August 2023. The matches were played from 26 to 28 September 2023. Participating in this round were the 10 winners from the previous round, 14 teams from 2022–23 Ekstraklasa which were not qualified to 2023–24 UEFA club competitions, top 16 teams of 2022–23 I liga and 16 winners of the regional cup competitions. Games were hosted by teams playing in the lower division in the 2023–24 season or by first drawn team in a case of match between clubs from the same division.

Team 1	Score	Team 2
19 September 2023
Miedź Legnica II (5)	0–3	Stal Rzeszów (2)
26 September 2023
Pogoń Siedlce (3)	1–3	Podbeskidzie Bielsko-Biała (2)
Concordia Elbląg (4)	0–4	Widzew Łódź (1)
Odra Opole (2)	1–2	Stal Mielec (1)
Motor Lublin (2)	0–1	Puszcza Niepołomice (1)
Jagiellonia Białystok II (4)	1–2	Korona Kielce (1)
KKS 1925 Kalisz (3)	2–3	ŁKS Łódź (1)
Start Krasnystaw (5)	0–4	Zawisza Bydgoszcz (4)
Wisła Puławy (3)	3–1	Chrobry Głogów (2)
Wieczysta Kraków (4)	0–4	Piast Gliwice (1)
Skra Częstochowa (3)	2–3 (a.e.t.)	Polonia Warsaw (2)
Jagiellonia Białystok (1)	2–0	Śląsk Wrocław (1)
Miedź Legnica (2)	0–2	Arka Gdynia (2)
27 September 2023
Stal Brzeg (5)	4–0	Unia Skierniewice (4)
Sokół Kleczew (4)	2–3 (a.e.t.)	Zagłębie Lubin (1)
Stal Stalowa Wola (3)	2–0	Znicz Pruszków (2)
Carina Gubin (4)	4–1	Radunia Stężyca (3)
Legia Warsaw II (4)	3–2	Ruch Chorzów (1)
KSZO Ostrowiec Świętokrzyski (4)	1–2	Warta Poznań (1)
GKS Katowice (2)	0–4	Górnik Zabrze (1)
Gryf Wejherowo (5)	1–3	Zagłębie Sosnowiec (2)
Górnik Łęczna (2)	3–4	Cracovia (1)
Garbarnia Kraków (4)	2–1	Radomiak Radom (1)
Chojniczanka Chojnice (3)	2–3	Resovia Rzeszów (2)
28 September 2023
GKS Tychy (2)	3–1	Wisła Płock (2)
Kotwica Kołobrzeg (3)	4–4 (a.e.t.) (3–4 p)	Bruk-Bet Termalica Nieciecza (2)
Pogoń Szczecin II (4)	1–4	Polonia Bytom (3)
Wisła Kraków (2)	2–1 (a.e.t.)	Lechia Gdańsk (2)

== Round of 32 ==
The draw for this round was conducted in the headquarter of Polish Football Association on 29 September 2023. The matches were played from 31 October to 8 November 2023. Participating in this round were the 28 winners from the previous round and 4 teams from 2022–23 Ekstraklasa which were qualified to 2023–24 UEFA club competitions. Games were hosted by teams playing in the lower division in the 2023–24 season or by first drawn team in a case of match between clubs from the same division.

Team 1	Score	Team 2
31 October 2023
Stal Brzeg (5)	0–4	Warta Poznań (1)
Carina Gubin (4)	1–0	Stal Stalowa Wola (3)
Bruk-Bet Termalica Nieciecza (2)	0–1	Piast Gliwice (1)
Stal Rzeszów (2)	1–0	Puszcza Niepołomice (1)
Legia Warsaw II (4)	2–4 (a.e.t.)	Korona Kielce (1)
Zawisza Bydgoszcz (4)	0–4	Lech Poznań (1)
Zagłębie Sosnowiec (2)	1–2 (a.e.t.)	Górnik Zabrze (1)
2 November 2023
GKS Tychy (2)	0–3	Legia Warsaw (1)
ŁKS Łódź (1)	0–2 (a.e.t.)	Raków Częstochowa (1)
Cracovia (1)	1–0	Zagłębie Lubin (1)
7 November 2023
Podbeskidzie Bielsko-Biała (2)	0–1	Pogoń Szczecin (1)
Wisła Kraków (2)	3–0	Polonia Warsaw (2)
8 November 2023
Polonia Bytom (3)	1–3 (a.e.t.)	Arka Gdynia (2)
Garbarnia Kraków (4)	2–4 (a.e.t.)	Stal Mielec (1)
Resovia Rzeszów (2)	1–3	Jagiellonia Białystok (1)
Wisła Puławy (3)	1–4	Widzew Łódź (1)

== Round of 16 ==
The draw for this round was conducted in the headquarter of Polish Football Association on 10 November 2023. The matches were played on 5–7 December 2023. Participating in this round were the 16 winners from the previous round. Games were hosted by teams playing in the lower division in the 2023–24 season or by first drawn team in a case of match between clubs from the same division.

Team 1	Score	Team 2
5 December 2023
Pogoń Szczecin (1)	2–1 (a.e.t.)	Górnik Zabrze (1)
Jagiellonia Białystok (1)	2–0	Warta Poznań (1)
6 December 2023
Korona Kielce (1)	2–1 (a.e.t.)	Legia Warsaw (1)
Raków Częstochowa (1)	1–0 (a.e.t.)	Cracovia (1)
Stal Mielec (1)	1–2	Widzew Łódź (1)
7 December 2023
Carina Gubin (4)	2–5	Piast Gliwice (1)
Wisła Kraków (2)	4–1	Stal Rzeszów (2)
Arka Gdynia (2)	0–1	Lech Poznań (1)

== Quarter-finals ==
The draw for this round was conducted in the headquarter of Polish Football Association on 8 December 2023. The matches were played on 27 and 28 February 2024. Participating in this round were the 8 winners from the previous round. Games were hosted by teams playing in the lower division in the 2023–24 season or by first drawn team in a case of match between clubs from the same division.

Team 1	Score	Team 2
27 February 2024
Lech Poznań (1)	0–1 (a.e.t.)	Pogoń Szczecin (1)
Piast Gliwice (1)	3–0	Raków Częstochowa (1)
28 February 2024
Wisła Kraków (2)	2–1 (a.e.t.)	Widzew Łódź (1)
Jagiellonia Białystok (1)	2–1 (a.e.t.)	Korona Kielce (1)

== Semi-finals ==
The draw for this round was conducted in the headquarter of Polish Football Association on 1 March 2024. The matches will be played on 2–4 April 2024. Participating in this round are the 4 winners from the previous round. Games will be hosted by teams playing in the lower division in the 2023–24 season or by first drawn team in a case of match between clubs from the same division.

Team 1	Score	Team 2
3 April 2024
Pogoń Szczecin (1)	2–1 (a.e.t.)	Jagiellonia Białystok (1)
Wisła Kraków (2)	2–1	Piast Gliwice (1)

3 April 2024	Pogoń Szczecin	2–1 (a.e.t.)	Jagiellonia Białystok	Szczecin
20:30 CEST (UTC+02:00)	Koulouris 59'; Ulvestad 98'	Report	Wdowik 79'	Stadium: Stadion Miejski; Attendance: 19,739; Referee: Paweł Raczkowski (Warsaw)

3 April 2024	Wisła Kraków	2–1	Piast Gliwice	Kraków
17:30 CEST (UTC+02:00)	Sobczak 1'; Alfaro 37'	Report	Mosór 54'	Stadium: Stadion Miejski; Attendance: 33,000; Referee: Bartosz Frankowski (Toruń)

== Final ==
2 May 2024
16:00 CEST (UTC+02:00)

Pogoń Szczecin	1–2 (a.e.t.)	Wisła Kraków
Koulouris 75'	90minut Łączy nas piłka	Satrústegui 90+9'; Rodado 93'

PGE Narodowy, Warsaw
Attendance: 47,506
Referee: Tomasz Kwiatkowski (Warsaw)
