= 2019–20 CFR Cluj season =

CFR Cluj
2019–20 season
- Chairman: Marian Bagacean
- Manager: Dan Petrescu
- Stadium: Dr. Constantin Rădulescu
- Liga I: 1st
- Cupa României: Round of 32
- Supercupa României: Runners-up
- UEFA Champions League: Play-off round
- UEFA Europa League: Round of 32
- Top goalscorer: League: Ciprian Deac (14 goals); All: Ciprian Deac (18 goals)
Home colours	Away colours	Third colours

The 2019–20 season is the 49th season in CFR Cluj's history, and the 24th in the top-flight of Romanian football. CFR Cluj is competing in Liga I, in the Cupa României and in the Champions League.

== Players ==
=== First-team squad ===
As of 8 February 2020

Note: Flags indicate national team as defined under FIFA eligibility rules; some limited exceptions apply. Players may hold more than one non-FIFA nationality.

No.	Pos.	Nation	Player
3	DF	ROU	Andrei Burcă
4	DF	ROU	Cristian Manea
5	MF	MLI	Yacouba Sylla
6	MF	POR	Luís Aurélio
7	MF	ROU	Alexandru Păun
8	MF	CRO	Damjan Djoković
9	FW	FRA	Billel Omrani
10	MF	ROU	Ciprian Deac
11	MF	FRA	Michaël Pereira
12	GK	POL	Grzegorz Sandomierski
13	DF	ROU	Denis Ciobotariu
16	DF	BIH	Mateo Sušić
18	FW	ROU	Valentin Costache
20	FW	ROU	George Țucudean
21	DF	CIV	Kévin Boli (on loan from Guizhou Hengfeng)
23	FW	ROU	Cătălin Golofca

No.	Pos.	Nation	Player
27	MF	ROU	Alexandru Chipciu
28	MF	ROU	Ovidiu Hoban
37	MF	ROU	Mihai Bordeianu
45	DF	POR	Camora (Captain)
55	DF	BRA	Paulo Vinícius
62	MF	ROU	Claudiu Petrila
74	GK	ROU	Ionuț Rus
87	GK	LTU	Giedrius Arlauskis
90	FW	CIV	Lacina Traoré
91	MF	ROU	Răzvan Andronic
92	DF	COD	Mike Cestor
94	MF	ROU	Cătălin Itu
96	DF	ROU	Dodi Joca
97	MF	ROU	Alin Fica
99	FW	VEN	Mario Rondón

=== Transfers ===
==== In ====
No.	Pos.	Nation	Player
27	MF	ROU	Sebastian Mailat (loan return from Gaz Metan Mediaș)
12	GK	ROU	Cosmin Vâtcă (from Voluntari)
3	DF	ROU	Andrei Burcă (from Botoșani)
25	DF	ROU	Mihai Butean (from Astra Giurgiu)
92	DF	COD	Mike Cestor (from Astra Giurgiu)
16	DF	BIH	Mateo Sušić (from (Moldova) Sheriff Tiraspol)
6	MF	POR	Luís Aurélio (from Gaz Metan Mediaș)
11	MF	FRA	Michaël Pereira (from (Turkey) Yeni Malatyaspor)
5	MF	MLI	Yacouba Sylla (from (Norway) Strømsgodset)
99	FW	VEN	Mario Rondón (from Gaz Metan Mediaș)
90	FW	CIV	Lacina Traoré (from (Hungary) Újpest)
23	FW	ROU	Cătălin Golofca (from Botoșani)
2	DF	ROU	Alex Pașcanu (from (England) Leicester City)
—	DF	GRE	Giannis Kontoes (from (Greece) Apollon Smyrnis)
13	DF	ROU	Denis Ciobotariu (from Dinamo București)
27	MF	ROU	Alexandru Chipciu (from (Belgium) Anderlecht)
12	GK	POL	Grzegorz Sandomierski (from (Poland) Jagiellonia Białystok)
74	GK	ROU	Ionuț Rus (loan return from Turris Turnu Măgurele)
91	MF	ROU	Răzvan Andronic (from Botoșani)

==== Loans in ====
No.	Pos.	Nation	Player
4	DF	ROU	Cristian Manea (from (Cyprus) Apollon Limassol, previously on loan at FCSB)

==== Out ====
No.	Pos.	Nation	Player
21	DF	CIV	Kévin Boli (loan return to (China) Guizhou Hengfeng)
6	DF	ROU	Cristian Manea (loan return to (Cyprus) Apollon Limassol)
22	DF	HUN	Ádám Lang (to (Cyprus) Omonia)
5	MF	CRO	Mate Maleš (to (Norway) Sarpsborg 08)
14	MF	POR	Thierry Moutinho (to FCSB)
—	MF	FRA	Bryan Nouvier (to (Poland) Raków Częstochowa, previously on loan at Sepsi Sfântu Gheorghe)
26	FW	ROU	Cristian Bud (to Turris Turnu Măgurele)
—	FW	ROU	Gabriel Dodoi (to Rapid București, previously on loan at Pandurii Târgu Jiu)
19	MF	ARG	Emmanuel Culio (to (Argentina) Quailmes)
30	DF	ROU	Andrei Mureșan (to Universitatea Cluj)
4	DF	ROU	Răzvan Horj (to Universitatea Cluj)
77	DF	ROU	Andrei Peteleu (to (Moldova) Sheriff Tiraspol)
12	GK	ROU	Cosmin Vâtcă (released)
88	FW	CMR	Robert Tambe (to (China) Shaanxi Chang'an Athletic, previously on loan)
33	GK	ROU	Adrian Rus (released)

==== Loans out ====
No.	Pos.	Nation	Player
31	MF	ROU	Alexandru Ioniță (to Universitatea Craiova)
88	FW	CMR	Robert Tambe (to (Moldova) Sheriff Tiraspol)
—	GK	ROU	Ionuț Rus (to Turris Turnu Măgurele)
—	DF	ROU	Andrei Radu (to Politehnica Iasi)
95	DF	ROU	Rareș Ispas (to Sportul Snagov)
2	DF	ROU	Alex Pașcanu (to Voluntari)
25	DF	ROU	Mihai Butean (to Gaz Metan Mediaș)
1	GK	ESP	Jesús Fernández (to (Greece) Panetolikos)
31	MF	ROU	Alexandru Ioniță (to Astra Giurgiu, previously on loan at Universitatea Craiova)
27	MF	ROU	Sebastian Mailat (to Universitatea Cluj)
—	DF	GRE	Giannis Kontoes (to Academica Clinceni)

==== Overall transfer activity ====
===== Expenditure =====
Summer: ▼€1,100,000

Winter: ▼€210,000

Total: ▼€1,310,000

===== Income =====
Summer: ▲€200,000

Winter: ▲€000,000

Total: ▲€200,000

===== Net Totals =====
Summer: ▼€900,000

Winter: ▼€210,000

Total: ▼€1,110,000

== Preseason and friendlies ==
Win Draw Loss

18 June 2019	CFR Cluj	1–0	Orenburg
EEST (UTC+3)	Djoković 31'	Report

22 June 2019	Red Star Belgrade	1–1	CFR Cluj	Windischgarsten, Austria
EEST (UTC+3)	Savić 67'	Report	Vinícius 80'	Stadium: DANA Arena; Attendance: 200

26 June 2019	Osijek	1–2	CFR Cluj
EEST (UTC+3)

28 June 2019	CFR Cluj	1–0	Mladá Boleslav
EEST (UTC+3)	Burcă 38'	Report

29 June 2019	CFR Cluj	1–0	Sparta Prague
EEST (UTC+3)	Țucudean 87'	Report

17 January 2020	CFR Cluj	1–2	Holstein Kiel	Oliva, Spain
16:00 EET (UTC+2)	Omrani 67'		Baku 57'; Eberwein 82'	Stadium: Oliva Nova Golf & Beach Resort Campo 1 Attendance: 300

20 January 2020	CFR Cluj	cancelled	Ferencvárosi TC	La Nucia, Spain
18:30 EET (UTC+2)				Stadium: Estadio Camilo Cano

21 January 2020	CFR Cluj	1–1	SV Wehen Wiesbaden	Oliva, Spain
15:00 EET (UTC+2)	Camora 47'		Schäffler 23'	Stadium: Oliva Nova Golf & Beach Resort Campo 1

22 January 2020	CFR Cluj	2–1	Dundalk	Oliva, Spain
16:00 EET (UTC+2)	Țucudean 72'; Petrila 88'		Boyle 26'	Stadium: Oliva Nova Golf & Beach Resort Campo 1

24 January 2020	CFR Cluj	0–1	ES Sétif	La Nucia, Spain
16:00 EET (UTC+2)			Kendouci 73'	Stadium: Stade Olímpico Camilo Cano

25 January 2020	CFR Cluj	3–2	Emelec	La Nucia, Spain
12:00 EET (UTC+2)	Vinícius 35'; Păun 37'; Țucudean 90'		Cevallos 26'; Barceló 69'	Stadium: Stade Olímpico Camilo Cano

== Competitions ==
Win Draw Loss

=== Overview ===
Competition	First match	Last match	Starting round	Final position	Record							
Competition	First match	Last match	Starting round	Final position	Pld	W	D	L	GF	GA	GD	Win %
Liga I	13 July 2019	3 August 2020	Matchday 1	Winners	36	22	9	5	68	23	+45	61.11
Cupa României	25 September 2019		Round of 32	Round of 32	1	0	1	0	2	2	+0	0.00
Supercupa României	6 July 2019		Final	Runners-up	1	0	0	1	0	1	−1	0.00
UEFA Champions League	9 July 2019	28 August 2019	First Qualifying Round	Play-off round	8	3	2	3	11	10	+1	37.50
UEFA Europa League	19 September 2019	27 February 2020	Group stage	Round of 32	8	4	2	2	7	5	+2	50.00
Total					54	29	14	11	88	41	+47	53.70

Last updated: 3 August 2020
Source: Competitions

=== Liga I ===
The Liga I fixture list was announced in July 2019.

==== Regular season ====
===== Table =====
Pos	Team	Pld	W	D	L	GF	GA	GD	Pts	Qualification
1	CFR Cluj	26	15	7	4	51	16	+35	52	Qualification for the Championship round
2	Universitatea Craiova	26	14	4	8	41	28	+13	46	Qualification for the Championship round
3	Botoșani	26	12	9	5	36	30	+6	45	Qualification for the Championship round
4	FCSB	26	13	5	8	37	29	+8	44	Qualification for the Championship round
5	Gaz Metan Mediaș	26	12	7	7	34	30	+4	43	Qualification for the Championship round

Source: LPF (in Romanian), Soccerway
Rules for classification: 1) Points; 2) Head-to-head points; 3) Head-to-head goal difference; 4) Head-to-head goals scored; 5) Goal difference; 6) Goals scored; 7) Play-off.

===== Results summary =====
Overall								Home						Away					
Pld	W	D	L	GF	GA	GD	Pts	W	D	L	GF	GA	GD	W	D	L	GF	GA	GD
26	15	7	4	51	16	+35	52	11	2	0	30	2	+28	4	5	4	21	14	+7

Last updated: 23 February 2020.
Source: Liga I

===== Results by round =====
Round	1	2	3	4	5	6	7	8	9	10	11	12	13	14	15	16	17	18	19	20	21	22	23	24	25	26
Ground	H	A	H	A	H	A	H	A	H	A	H	A	H	A	H	A	H	A	H	A	H	A	H	A	H	A
Result	D	W	W	W	W	D	W	L	W	D	W	L	W	L	W	D	W	D	W	L	W	W	W	D	D	W
Position	9	4	4	2	1	1	1	2	1	1	1	1	1	1	1	1	1	1	1	2	1	1	1	1	1	1

Updated to match(es) played on 23 February 2020. Source: Liga I
A = Away; H = Home; W = Win; D = Draw; L = Loss

===== Matches =====
Win Draw Loss

13 July 2019 1	CFR Cluj	1–1	Politehnica Iași	Cluj-Napoca
21:00 EEST (UTC+03)	Deac 23'; Itu (yellow card) 40'; Sylla (yellow card) 51'; Djoković (yellow card) 78'	Report	Gallego (yellow card) 56'; Loshaj 62'	Stadium: Dr. Constantin Rădulescu; Attendance: 2,000; Referee: Cătălin Popa

20 July 2019 2	Academica Clinceni	1–4	CFR Cluj	Clinceni
21:00 EEST (UTC+03)	Patriche (yellow card) 43'; Jakub Vojtuš (yellow card) 56'; Răuță (yellow card) 56' (yellow-red card) 58'; Dobrescu 90'	Report	Cestor 11'; Costache 15'; Itu 45'; Aurélio (yellow card) 47', (goal) 72'; Petrila (yellow card) 90'	Stadium: Clinceni; Attendance: 500; Referee: Marius Avram

27 July 2019 3	CFR Cluj	1–0	Dinamo București	Cluj-Napoca
21:00 EEST (UTC+03)	Arlauskis (yellow card) 11'; Costache (yellow card) 60'; Hoban (yellow card) 66'; Mailat (yellow card) 73' (yellow-red card) 89'; Omrani 83' (pen.)	Report		Stadium: Dr. Constantin Rădulescu; Attendance: 5,000; Referee: Andrei Chivulete

3 August 2019 4	Chindia Târgoviște	1–4	CFR Cluj	Ploiești
21:00 EEST (UTC+03)	Novac (yellow card) 13'; Neicuțescu 27'; Yaméogo (yellow card) 44'	Report	Țucudean 49'; Păun 67'; Deac 73', 89'	Stadium: Ilie Oană; Attendance: 6,000; Referee: George Găman

10 August 2019 5	CFR Cluj	3–0	Hermannstadt	Cluj-Napoca
21:00 EEST (UTC+03)	Păun 14', (yellow card) 72'; Sylla (yellow card) 76'; Costache 84'; Omrani 89' (pen.)	Report	Pires (yellow card) 7'; Opruț (yellow card) 88'	Stadium: Dr. Constantin Rădulescu; Attendance: 3,000; Referee: Horia Mladinovici

17 August 2019 6	Sepsi Sfântu Gheorghe	1–1	CFR Cluj	Sibiu
21:00 EEST (UTC+03)	Flores 31'; Barišić (yellow card) 45+1'	Report	Păun 10', (yellow card) 35'; Costache (yellow card) 30'; Cestor (yellow card) 57'; Butean (yellow card) 86'	Stadium: Municipal; Attendance: 4,500; Referee: István Kovács

24 August 2019 7	CFR Cluj	4–1	Botoșani	Cluj-Napoca
21:00 EEST (UTC+03)	Pereira 19'; Deac 25', 73' (pen.); Păun 37'; Costache (yellow card) 55'; Itu (yellow card) 61'; Peteleu (yellow card) 90+1'; Hoban (yellow card) 90+1'	Report	Miron (yellow card) 24'; Rodríguez (yellow card) 56'; Cîmpanu 79'; Ofosu (yellow card) 89'; Pierce (yellow card) 90+1'	Stadium: Dr. Constantin Rădulescu; Attendance: 3,000; Referee: Marcel Bîrsan

31 August 2019 8	Astra Giurgiu	3–2	CFR Cluj	Giurgiu
21:00 EEST (UTC+03)	Șerban (yellow card) 14'; Tamaș (yellow card) 22'; Radunović 38' (pen.), 64' (pen.); Gheorghe 57'; Silva (yellow card) 90+1'	Report	Păun 28', 90+1', (yellow card) 59'; Camora (yellow card) 39' (yellow-red card) 59'; Pereira (yellow card) 42'; Cestor (yellow card) 48'; Vâtcă (red card) 63'; Peteleu (yellow card) 90+1'	Stadium: Marin Anastasovici; Attendance: 1,000; Referee: Sebastian Colțescu

13 September 2019 9	CFR Cluj	5–0	Voluntari	Cluj-Napoca
21:00 EEST (UTC+03)	Itu 3'; Hoban 36'; Costache 37'; Achim 51' (o.g.); Omrani 68'	Report	Julio (red card) 12'; Simonovski (red card) 28'	Stadium: Dr. Constantin Rădulescu; Attendance: 2,500; Referee: Iulian Călin

22 September 2019 10	FCSB	0–0	CFR Cluj	Bucharest
20:30 EEST (UTC+03)	Cristea (yellow card) 45'; Tsoumou (yellow card) 49'; Panțîru (yellow card) 90+1'	Report	Bordeianu (yellow card) 90+5'	Stadium: Arena Națională; Attendance: 15,877; Referee: Ovidiu Hațegan

29 September 2019 11	CFR Cluj	3–0	Gaz Metan Mediaș	Cluj-Napoca
20:30 EEST (UTC+03)	Vinícius 20', (yellow card) 34'; Deac (yellow card) 22'; Peteleu (yellow card) 35'; Boli 42'; Omrani 56'; Pereira (yellow card) 90+4'	Report	Droppa (yellow card) 23'	Stadium: Dr. Constantin Rădulescu; Attendance: 4,000; Referee: István Kovács

6 October 2019 12	Viitorul Constanța	3–1	CFR Cluj	Ovidiu
20:30 EEST (UTC+03)	Peteleu 27' (o.g.); Matei 37'; Boboc (yellow card) 45'; Rivaldinho 57'; Țîru (yellow card) 71'; Filip (yellow card) 75'	Report	Cestor (yellow card) 8'; Culio (yellow card) 69', (goal) 76' (pen.)	Stadium: Viitorul; Attendance: 4,000; Referee: George Găman

19 October 2019 13	CFR Cluj	2–0	Universitatea Craiova	Cluj-Napoca
20:30 EEST (UTC+03)	Culio (yellow card) 56'; Traoré 70'; Pereira (yellow card) 74'; Omrani 78'	Report	Mihăilă (yellow card) 52'; Bălașa (yellow card) 61'; Vătăjelu (yellow card) 76'; Ivan (yellow card) 89'	Stadium: Dr. Constantin Rădulescu; Attendance: 6,000; Referee: Radu Petrescu

28 October 2019 14	Politehnica Iași	2–1	CFR Cluj	Botoșani
20:30 EEST (UTC+02)	Loshaj (yellow card) 20'; Passaglia 45'; Gallego 76'; Diallo (yellow card) 77'; Bădic (yellow card) 83'; Târnovanu (yellow card) 90+4'	Report	Costache 10'	Stadium: Municipal; Attendance: 200; Referee: Marius Avram

2 November 2019 15	CFR Cluj	3–0	Academica Clinceni	Cluj-Napoca
20:30 EET (UTC+02)	Burcă (yellow card) 45+3'; Culio 52' (pen.); Traoré 69'; Deac 71'	Report	Cebotaru (yellow card) 45+1'; Șut (yellow card) 66'; Patriche (yellow card) 82'	Stadium: Dr. Constantin Rădulescu; Attendance: 2,980; Referee: Cătălin Buși

10 November 2019 16	Dinamo București	0–0	CFR Cluj	Bucharest
19:00 EET (UTC+02)	Puljić (yellow card) 79'	Report	Aurélio (yellow card) 76'	Stadium: Dinamo; Attendance: 4,311; Referee: Ovidiu Hațegan

22 November 2019 17	CFR Cluj	4–0	Chindia Târgoviște	Cluj-Napoca
20:30 EET (UTC+02)	Itu 3'; Bordeianu (yellow card) 34', (goal) 71', 79'; Camora 86'	Report		Stadium: Dr. Constantin Rădulescu; Attendance: 1,500; Referee: Iulian Călin

1 December 2019 18	Hermannstadt	1–1	CFR Cluj	Sibiu
19:00 EET (UTC+02)	Bușu (yellow card) 11'; Viera (yellow card) 49'; Luchin (yellow card) 64'; Petrescu 85' (pen.); Cristiano (yellow card) 90+4'	Report	Omrani (yellow card) 78', (goal) 79'; Pașcanu (yellow card) 84'	Stadium: Municipal; Attendance: 4,000; Referee: Lucian Rușandu

4 December 2019 19	CFR Cluj	1–0	Sepsi Sfântu Gheorghe	Cluj-Napoca
18:00 EET (UTC+02)	Vinícius 87'; Bordeianu (yellow card) 90+2'	Report	Dimitrov (yellow card) 29'; Bouhenna (yellow card) 61'	Stadium: Dr. Constantin Rădulescu; Attendance: 1,650; Referee: Andrei Chivulete

8 December 2019 20	Botoșani	2–1	CFR Cluj	Botoșani
17:30 EET (UTC+02)	Aškovski 14'; Haruț (yellow card) 68'; Roman 71'; Țigănașu (yellow card) 73'; Miron (yellow card) 78'; Patache (yellow card) 85'; Moussa (yellow card) 90+2'	Report	Pereira 21'; Djoković (yellow card) 80'; Cestor (yellow card) 86'	Stadium: Municipal; Attendance: 1,400; Referee: Marcel Bîrsan

16 December 2019 21	CFR Cluj	2–0	Astra Giurgiu	Cluj-Napoca
20:00 EET (UTC+02)	Burcă 23'; Culio 84'; Bordeianu (yellow card) 90'; Arlauskis (yellow card) 90+1'	Report	Gheorghe (yellow card) 3'; Simion (yellow card) 29'; Bègue (yellow card) 63'; Tamaș (yellow card) 66'; Budescu (yellow card) 80' (yellow-red card) 83'; Dandea (yellow card) 90+5'	Stadium: Dr. Constantin Rădulescu; Attendance: 5,000; Referee: István Kovács

21 December 2019 22	Voluntari	0–4	CFR Cluj	Voluntari
20:00 EET (UTC+02)	Vlad (yellow card) 13'	Report	Sušić 5'; Culio 14' (pen.); Deac 37'; Camora 90+2'	Stadium: Anghel Iordănescu; Attendance: 350; Referee: George Rădulescu

2 February 2020 23	CFR Cluj	1–0	FCSB	Cluj-Napoca
20:00 EET (UTC+02)	Omrani (yellow card) 30'; Djoković (yellow card) 64'; Vinícius 79'; Deac (yellow card) 82'	Report	Man (yellow card) 64'; Olaru (yellow card) 73'; Planić (red card) 77'; Crețu (yellow card) 77'; Coman (yellow card) 79'	Stadium: Dr. Constantin Rădulescu; Attendance: 9,800; Referee: István Kovács

8 February 2020 24	Gaz Metan Mediaș	0–0	CFR Cluj	Mediaș
20:00 EET (UTC+02)	Moura (yellow card) 69'; Constantin (yellow card) 84'	Report	Vinícius (yellow card) 85'	Stadium: Gaz Metan; Attendance: 1,300; Referee: Andrei Chivulete

14 February 2020 25	CFR Cluj	0–0	Viitorul Constanța	Cluj-Napoca
20:00 EET (UTC+02)		Report	Artean (yellow card) 60'; Iacob (yellow card) 70'; Matei (yellow card) 86'; Boboc (yellow card) 90+1'	Stadium: Dr. Constantin Rădulescu; Attendance: 4,000; Referee: Radu Petrescu

23 February 2020 26	Universitatea Craiova	0–2	CFR Cluj	Craiova
20:00 EET (UTC+02)	Martić (yellow card) 68'; Ćosić (yellow card) 90'	Report	Rondón 9'; Costache (yellow card) 41'; Martić 68' (o.g.); Chipciu (yellow card) 80'	Stadium: Ion Oblemenco; Attendance: 29,000; Referee: Marcel Bîrsan

==== Championship round ====
===== Table =====
Pos	Team	Pld	W	D	L	GF	GA	GD	Pts	Qualification
1	CFR Cluj (C)	10	7	2	1	17	7	+10	49	Qualification to Champions League first qualifying round
2	Universitatea Craiova	9	7	0	2	17	14	+3	44	Qualification to Europa League first qualifying round
3	Astra Giurgiu (Note: Astra Giurgiu failed to obtain a UEFA licence.)	8	3	3	2	12	8	+4	33	
4	Botoșani	10	2	3	5	10	12	−2	32	Qualification to Europa League first qualifying round
5	FCSB (Note: FCSB qualified for the Europa League first qualifying round by winning the 2019–20 Cupa României.)	9	2	3	4	13	14	−1	31	Qualification to Europa League first qualifying round
6	Gaz Metan Mediaș	10	0	3	7	5	19	−14	25	

Source: Soccerway, FRF (in Romanian), LPF (in Romanian)
Rules for classification: 1) Points; 2) Points without rounding; 3) Head-to-head points; 4) Head-to-head goal difference; 5) Head-to-head goals scored; 6) Goal difference; 7) Goals scored; 8) Play-off (only if needed to decide champion or teams for UEFA competitions). (Note: only criteria 6 and 7 are applied to establish the classification during the competition.)
(C) Champions

===== Results summary =====
Overall								Home						Away					
Pld	W	D	L	GF	GA	GD	Pts	W	D	L	GF	GA	GD	W	D	L	GF	GA	GD
10	7	2	1	17	7	+10	23	4	0	1	8	4	+4	3	2	0	9	3	+6

Last updated: 3 August 2020.
Source: Liga I

===== Position by round =====
Round	1	2	3	4	5	6	7	8	9	10
Ground	H	A	H	A	H	A	H	H	A	A
Result	W	D	W	W	L	D	W	W	W	W
Position	1	1	1	1	1	2	2	2	1	1

Updated to match(es) played on 3 August 2020. Source: Liga I
A = Away; H = Home; W = Win; D = Draw; L = Loss

===== Matches =====
Win Draw Loss

2 March 2020 1	CFR Cluj	2–1	Astra Giurgiu	Cluj-Napoca
20:30 EET (UTC+02)	Deac 9'; Arlauskis (yellow card) 57'; Petrila (yellow card) 79'; Păun 81'; Bordeianu (yellow card) 89'	Report	Răduț (yellow card) 40'; Alibec 58', (yellow card) 78'; Bègue (yellow card) 65'; Radunović (yellow card) 72'	Stadium: Dr. Constantin Rădulescu; Attendance: 6,000; Referee: Cătălin Popa

9 March 2020 2	Gaz Metan Mediaș	0–0	CFR Cluj	Mediaș
20:30 EET (UTC+02)	Constantin (yellow card) 5'; Larie (yellow card) 75'	Report	Omrani (yellow card) 37'; Hoban (yellow card) 86' (yellow-red card) 90+2'	Stadium: Gaz Metan; Attendance: 0 Referee: George Găman
Note: Match was played behind closed doors due to concerns over the coronavirus outbreak.

14 June 2020 3	CFR Cluj	1–0	FCSB	Cluj-Napoca
20:00 EEST (UTC+03)	Popescu 23' (o.g.); Deac (yellow card) 29'; Bordeianu (yellow card) 72'; Burcă (yellow card) 75'; Păun (yellow card) 87'; Rondón (yellow card) 89'	Report	Tănase (yellow card) 37'; Nedelcu (yellow card) 45+1'; Planić (yellow card) 75'; Olaru (yellow card) 78'	Stadium: Dr. Constantin Rădulescu; Attendance: 0 Referee: Ovidiu Hațegan
Note: The match should have been played on 15 March 2020, but it was postponed due to concerns over the coronavirus outbreak.

20 June 2020 4	Botoșani	0–2	CFR Cluj	Botoșani
20:00 EEST (UTC+03)	Aškovski (yellow card) 7'; Țigănașu (yellow card) 90+2'	Report	Deac 3' (pen.), 12'	Stadium: Municipal; Attendance: 0 Referee: Cătălin Popa
Note: The match should have been played on 20 March 2020, but it was postponed due to concerns over the coronavirus outbreak. On 11 June announced the league administration that a member of the medical staff of FC Botoșani has tested positive for the COVID-19, which prompted the league the administration to postpone all FC Botoșani games until further notice. On 18 June FC Botoșani received a medical clearance to return to play, so its game against CFR Cluj has been kept as scheduled.

28 June 2020 5	CFR Cluj	2–3	Universitatea Craiova	Cluj-Napoca
20:00 EEST (UTC+03)	Costache (yellow card) 6'; Deac 60'; Vinícius 70'; Traoré (yellow card) 89'	Report	Koljić 9'; Bălașa (yellow card) 51'; Mihăilă 55'; Cicâldău 87'; Pigliacelli (yellow card) 90+5'	Stadium: Dr. Constantin Rădulescu; Attendance: 0 Referee: István Kovács
Note: The match should have been played on 4 April 2020, but it was postponed due to concerns over the coronavirus pandemic.

5 July 2020 6	Astra Giurgiu	2–2	CFR Cluj	Giurgiu
20:00 EEST (UTC+03)	Bordeianu 31' (o.g.); Seto (yellow card) 36'; Alibec 79'; Răduț (yellow card) 85'; Lazar (yellow card) 90+2'; Dima (yellow card) 90+3'	Report	Rondón 12'; Burcă 16', (yellow card) 81'; Sušić (yellow card) 49'; Bordeianu (yellow card) 90'	Stadium: Marin Anastasovici; Attendance: 0 Referee: Andrei Chivulete
Note: The match should have been played on 11 April 2020, but it was postponed due to concerns over the coronavirus pandemic.

13 July 2020 7	CFR Cluj	2–0	Gaz Metan Mediaș	Cluj-Napoca
20:30 EEST (UTC+03)	Deac 39' (pen.); Đoković 49'; Rondón (yellow card) 50'; Boli (red card) 80'	Report	Larie (yellow card) 6'; Droppa (yellow card) 22'; Chamed (yellow card) 34'	Stadium: Dr. Constantin Rădulescu; Attendance: 0 Referee: Ovidiu Hațegan
Note: The match should have been played on 18 April 2020, but it was postponed due to concerns over the coronavirus pandemic.

28 July 2020 9	CFR Cluj	1–0	Botoșani	Cluj-Napoca
21:00 EEST (UTC+03)	Deac 41' (pen.); Bordeianu (yellow card) 44'; Rondón (yellow card) 85'	Report	Papa (yellow card) 7'; Babunski (yellow card) 90+3'	Stadium: Dr. Constantin Rădulescu; Attendance: 0 Referee: Marius Avram
Note: The match should have been played on 2 May 2020, but it was postponed due to concerns over the coronavirus pandemic. Following its rescheduling for the 26 July 2020, the game was postponed for a second time after the league administration announced on 24 July that several members of CFR Cluj tested positive for COVID-19. The game was then rescheduled for 28 July.

31 July 2020 8	FCSB	0–2	CFR Cluj	Bucharest
21:30 EEST (UTC+03)	Crețu (yellow card) 39'	Report	Sušić 85'; Itu 87'	Stadium: Arena Națională; Attendance: 0 Referee: István Kovács
Note: The match should have been played on 25 April 2020, but it was postponed due to concerns over the coronavirus pandemic. Following its rescheduling for the 18 July 2020, the game was postponed for a second time after the league administration announced on 18 July that several members of CFR Cluj tested positive for COVID-19. The game was later rescheduled for the 30 July 2020. Following the rescheduling of the CFR Cluj v Botoșani game, the game was moved with one to be played on 31 July.

3 August 2020 10	Universitatea Craiova	1−3	CFR Cluj	Craiova
21:00 EEST (UTC+03)	Nistor 9', (yellow card) 58'; Ćosić (yellow card) 76'	Report	Vinícius 36'; Chipciu (yellow card) 41'; Boli 56'; Deac 77' (pen.); Pereira (yellow card) 90+1'	Stadium: Ion Oblemenco; Attendance: 0 Referee: Ovidiu Hațegan
Note: The match should have been played on 9 May 2020, but it was postponed due to concerns over the coronavirus pandemic.

=== Cupa României ===
CFR Cluj will enter the Cupa României at the Round of 32.

==== Round of 32 ====
25 September 2019 Round of 32	Botoșani	2–2 (a.e.t.) (4–2 p)	CFR Cluj	Botoșani
16:30 EEST (UTC+03)	Papa (yellow card) 10'; Aškovski 37'; Chindriș (yellow card) 39'; Ebenhofer (yellow card) 72'; Rodríguez 81' (pen.); Pierce (yellow card) 97'; Keyta (yellow card) 99'; Mendoza (yellow card) 120+1'	Report	Sušić (yellow card) 20'; Bordeianu (yellow card) 27' (yellow-red card) 31'; Burcă (yellow card) 45', (goal) 60'; Golofca 56'; Djoković (yellow card) 61'; Mailat (yellow card) 61'	Stadium: Municipal; Attendance: 2,000; Referee: Andrei Chivulete
	Penalties
	Rodríguez (penalty scored); Cîmpanu (penalty missed); Holzmann (penalty scored); Cascini (penalty scored); Pierce (penalty scored)		(penalty scored) Mureșan; (penalty scored) Djoković; (penalty missed) Aurélio; (penalty missed) Mailat

=== Supercupa României ===
CFR Cluj will play in the Romanian Supercup as winners of the Liga I against Cupa României winners Viitorul Constanța.

6 July 2019 Final	CFR Cluj	0–1	Viitorul Constanța	Ploiești
20:00 EEST (UTC+03)	Omrani (yellow card) 12'; Djoković (yellow card) 28'; Camora (yellow card) 90'		Iacob (yellow card) 41'; Iancu (yellow card) 50'; Artean 86'	Stadium: Ilie Oană; Attendance: 7,218; Referee: Constantin Colțescu

=== UEFA Champions League ===
As winners of the 2018-19 Liga I, CFR Cluj entered the Champions League at the first qualifying round.

==== First qualifying round ====
The draw for the first round took place on 18 June. CFR Cluj was drawn to play against Kazakh champions Astana.

9 July 2019 1st Leg	Astana (Kazakhstan)	1–0	(Romania) CFR Cluj	Nur-Sultan
16:00 EEST (UTC+03)	Postnikov 68', (yellow card) 90+5'	Report	Camora (yellow card) 85'	Stadium: Astana Arena; Attendance: 18,587; Referee: Lawrence Visser (Belgium)

17 July 2019 2nd Leg	CFR Cluj (Romania)	3–1 (3–2 agg.)	(Kazakhstan) Astana	Cluj-Napoca
21:00 EEST (UTC+03)	Omrani 10', 26', 73'	Report	Murtazayev 4'	Stadium: Dr. Constantin Rădulescu; Attendance: 8,092; Referee: Alexander Harkam (Austria)

==== Second qualifying round ====
CFR Cluj advanced to the second qualifying round. The draw for the second round took place on 19 June. CFR Cluj was drawn to play against Israeli champions Maccabi Tel Aviv.

24 July 2019 1st Leg	CFR Cluj (Romania)	1–0	(Israel) Maccabi Tel Aviv	Cluj-Napoca
21:00 EEST (UTC+03)	Omrani 22'; Djoković (yellow card) 42'	Report	Kandil (yellow card) 80'	Stadium: Dr. Constantin Rădulescu; Attendance: 11,150; Referee: José María Sánchez Martínez (Spain)

30 July 2019 2nd Leg	Maccabi Tel Aviv (Israel)	2–2 (2–3 agg.)	(Romania) CFR Cluj	Netanya
20:00 EEST (UTC+03)	Blackman 15'; Cohen 48'; Atar (yellow card) 74'	Report	Deac (yellow card) 14'; Culio 18' (pen.); Rondón 42'; Burcă (yellow card) 90'	Stadium: Netanya Stadium; Attendance: 11,947; Referee: Marco Fritz (Germany)

==== Third qualifying round ====
CFR Cluj advanced to the third qualifying round. The draw for the third round took place on 22 July. CFR Cluj was drawn to play against Scottish champions Celtic.

7 August 2019 1st Leg	CFR Cluj (Romania)	1–1	(Scotland) Celtic	Cluj-Napoca
20:00 EEST (UTC+03)	Bordeianu (yellow card) 25'; Aurélio (yellow card) 34'; Rondón 28'; Sušić (yellow card) 64'	Report	Bolingoli-Mbombo (yellow card) 30'; Forrest 37'; Morgan (yellow card) 42'; Bitton (yellow card) 90+2'	Stadium: Dr. Constantin Rădulescu; Attendance: 13,055; Referee: Srđan Jovanović (Serbia)

13 August 2019 2nd Leg	Celtic (Scotland)	3–4 (4–5 agg.)	(Romania) CFR Cluj	Glasgow
21:45 EEST (UTC+03)	Abd Elhamed (yellow card) 41'; Forrest 51'; Édouard 61'; Christie 76'	Report	Deac 27'; Rondón (yellow card) 40'; Deac (yellow card) 62'; Omrani 74' (pen.), 80'; Arlauskis (yellow card) 87'; Țucudean 90+7'	Stadium: Celtic Park; Attendance: 50,964; Referee: Andris Treimanis (Latvia)

==== Play-off Round ====
CFR Cluj advanced to the play-off round. The draw for the play-off round took place on 5 August. CFR Cluj was drawn to play against Czech champions Slavia Prague.

20 August 2019 1st Leg	CFR Cluj (Romania)	0–1	(Czech Republic) Slavia Prague	Cluj-Napoca
22:00 EEST (UTC+03)	Djoković (yellow card) 31'; Bordeianu (yellow card) 45'; Burcă (yellow card) 70'; Omrani (penalty missed) 79'	Report	Masopust 28'; Coufal (yellow card) 43'; Souček (yellow card) 87'; Škoda (yellow card) 90+2'	Stadium: Dr. Constantin Rădulescu; Attendance: 15,196; Referee: Cüneyt Çakır (Turkey)

28 August 2019 2nd Leg	Slavia Prague (Czech Republic)	1–0 (2–0 agg.)	(Romania) CFR Cluj	Prague
22:00 EEST (UTC+03)	Masopust (yellow card) 40'; Kúdela (yellow card) 47'; Bořil 66'	Report	Mureșan (yellow card) 40'; Deac (yellow card) 44'; Țucudean (yellow card) 80'; Djoković (yellow card) 90+5'	Stadium: Sinobo Stadium; Attendance: 18,562; Referee: Gianluca Rocchi (Italy)

=== UEFA Europa League ===
After losing to Slavia Prague in the Champions League play-off round, CFR Cluj progressed to the Europa League group stage. The draw was held on 30 August. CFR Cluj was drawn with Lazio, Celtic and Rennes.

==== Group stage ====
Pos	Team	Pld	W	D	L	GF	GA	GD	Pts	Qualification	CEL	CLJ	LAZ	REN
1	(Scotland) Celtic	6	4	1	1	10	6	+4	13	Advance to knockout phase	—	2–0	2–1	3–1
2	(Romania) CFR Cluj	6	4	0	2	6	4	+2	12	Advance to knockout phase	2–0	—	2–1	1–0
3	(Italy) Lazio	6	2	0	4	6	9	−3	6		1–2	1–0	—	2–1
4	(France) Rennes	6	1	1	4	5	8	−3	4		1–1	0–1	2–0	—

Source: UEFA
Rules for classification: Group stage tiebreakers

19 September 2019 1	CFR Cluj (Romania)	2–1	(Italy) Lazio	Cluj-Napoca
19:55 EEST (UTC+03)	Deac 41' (pen.); Omrani 75'; Arlauskis (yellow card) 85'; Cestor (yellow card) 90+2'	Report	Bastos 25'; Lucas (yellow card) 40'; Cataldi (yellow card) 70'; Milinković-Savić (yellow card) 83'	Stadium: Dr. Constantin Rădulescu; Attendance: 9,222; Referee: Daniel Stefański (Poland)

3 October 2019 2	Celtic (Scotland)	2–0	(Romania) CFR Cluj	Glasgow
22:00 EEST (UTC+03)	Édouard 20', (yellow card) 88'; McGregor (yellow card) 25'; Jullien (yellow card) 47'; Elyounoussi 59'	Report	Rondón (yellow card) 42'; Djoković (yellow card) 51'	Stadium: Celtic Park; Attendance: 56,172; Referee: Daniel Siebert (Germany)

24 October 2019 3	Rennes (France)	0–1	(Romania) CFR Cluj	Rennes
22:00 EEST (UTC+03)	Mendy (red card) 5'; Niang (yellow card) 9', (penalty missed) 28'; Raphinha (yellow card) 23'; Camavinga (red card) 46'; Maouassa (yellow card) 51'	Report	Deac 9'; Sušić (yellow card) 17' (yellow-red card) 82'; Arlauskis (yellow card) 90+1'	Stadium: Roazhon Park; Attendance: 27,330; Referee: Aleksei Eskov (Russia)

7 November 2019 4	CFR Cluj (Romania)	1–0	(France) Rennes	Cluj-Napoca
19:55 EET (UTC+02)	Traoré (yellow card) 30'; Rondón 87', (red card) 90'	Report	Gnagnon (yellow card) 16'; Gboho (yellow card) 84'; Grenier (yellow card) 90+2'; Siebatcheu (yellow card) 90+4'	Stadium: Dr. Constantin Rădulescu; Attendance: 11,067; Referee: Tiago Martins (Portugal)

28 November 2019 5	Lazio (Italy)	1–0	(Romania) CFR Cluj	Rome
22:00 EET (UTC+02)	Correa 24'; Adekanye (yellow card) 57'	Report	Djoković (yellow card) 45+3'; Traoré (yellow card) 68'	Stadium: Olimpico; Attendance: 7,604; Referee: Ali Palabıyık (Turkey)

12 December 2019 6	CFR Cluj (Romania)	2–0	(Scotland) Celtic	Cluj-Napoca
19:55 EET (UTC+02)	Burcă 49'; Camora (yellow card) 68'; Djoković 70'	Report	Griffiths (yellow card) 71'	Stadium: Dr. Constantin Rădulescu; Attendance: 12,890; Referee: Halis Özkahya (Turkey)

==== Round of 32 ====
CFR Cluj advanced to the round of 32. The draw for the round of 32 took place on 16 December. CFR Cluj was drawn to play against the Spanish record-winner of the UEFA Europa League Sevilla.

20 February 2020 1st Leg	CFR Cluj (Romania)	1–1	(Spain) Sevilla	Cluj-Napoca
19:55 EET (UTC+02)	Deac 59' (pen.)	Report	Fernando (yellow card) 44'; Reguilón (yellow card) 74'; En-Nesyri 82'	Stadium: Dr. Constantin Rădulescu; Attendance: 14,820; Referee: Deniz Aytekin (Germany)

27 February 2020 2nd Leg	Sevilla (Spain)	0–0 (1–1 (a) agg.)	(Romania) CFR Cluj	Seville
22:00 EET (UTC+02)	Navas (yellow card) 44'; Ocampos (yellow card) 88'; En-Nesyri (yellow card) 90+2'	Report	Deac (yellow card) 59'; Đoković (yellow card) 73'; Bordeianu (yellow card) 74' (yellow-red card) 90+1'; Boli (yellow card) 85'	Stadium: Ramón Sánchez Pizjuán; Attendance: 31,338; Referee: Andris Treimanis (Latvia)

== Statistics ==
=== Appearances and goals ===
As of 3 August 2020

No.	Pos	Player	Liga I		Cupa României		Supercupa României		UEFA Champions League		UEFA Europa League		Total	
No.	Pos	Player	Apps	Goals	Apps	Goals	Apps	Goals	Apps	Goals	Apps	Goals	Apps	Goals
3	DF	(Romania) Andrei Burcă	19+2	2	1	1	0	0	8	0	8	1	38	4
4	DF	(Romania) Cristian Manea	5	0	0	0	0	0	0	0	2	0	7	0
5	MF	(Mali) Yacouba Sylla	2+2	0	0	0	0	0	0+1	0	0	0	5	0
6	MF	(Portugal) Luís Aurélio	3+7	1	1	0	0	0	4+1	0	1+1	0	18	1
7	MF	(Romania) Alexandru Păun	13+11	7	0	0	0	0	1+6	0	4+3	0	38	7
8	MF	(Croatia) Damjan Djoković	15+3	1	1	0	1	0	7	0	8	1	35	2
9	FW	(France) Billel Omrani	12+16	6	0	0	1	0	8	6	7+1	1	45	13
10	MF	(Romania) Ciprian Deac	23+2	14	0	0	1	0	8	1	7+1	3	42	18
11	MF	(France) Michaël Pereira	10+6	2	0	0	0	0	0+2	0	0	0	18	2
12	GK	(Poland) Grzegorz Sandomierski	1	0	0	0	0	0	0	0	0	0	1	0
13	DF	(Romania) Denis Ciobotariu	0+1	0	0	0	0	0	0	0	0	0	1	0
16	DF	(Bosnia and Herzegovina) Mateo Sušić	15+1	2	1	0	0	0	8	0	3+1	0	29	2
18	MF	(Romania) Valentin Costache	31+3	4	0	0	1	0	0+1	0	0	0	36	4
20	FW	(Romania) George Țucudean	2+3	1	0	0	0+1	0	1+4	1	0	0	11	2
21	DF	(Ivory Coast) Kévin Boli	15	2	0	0	0	0	0	0	5+1	0	21	2
23	FW	(Romania) Cătălin Golofca	1+6	0	1	1	0	0	0	0	0+5	0	13	1
27	MF	(Romania) Alexandru Chipciu	3+6	0	0	0	0	0	0	0	0	0	9	0
28	MF	(Romania) Ovidiu Hoban	21+6	1	0	0	0	0	1+3	0	0+4	0	35	1
37	MF	(Romania) Mihai Bordeianu	13+8	2	1	0	1	0	8	0	8	0	39	2
45	DF	(Portugal) Camora	29	2	0	0	1	0	8	0	8	0	46	2
55	DF	(Brazil) Paulo Vinícius	25	5	0	0	1	0	6	0	2	0	34	5
62	MF	(Romania) Claudiu Petrila	1+13	0	1	0	0+1	0	0	0	0	0	16	0
74	GK	(Romania) Ionuț Rus	0	0	0	0	0	0	0	0	0	0	0	0
87	GK	(Lithuania) Giedrius Arlauskis	28	0	0	0	1	0	8	0	8	0	45	0
89	GK	(Romania) Otto Hindrich	1	0	0	0	0	0	0	0	0	0	1	0
90	FW	(Ivory Coast) Lacina Traoré	6+5	2	0+1	0	0	0	0	0	6+1	0	19	2
91	MF	(Romania) Răzvan Andronic	0	0	0	0	0	0	0	0	0	0	0	0
92	DF	(Democratic Republic of the Congo) Mike Cestor	10+1	1	0+1	0	0	0	1	0	3+1	0	17	1
94	MF	(Romania) Cătălin Itu	31+2	4	0	0	1	0	0	0	0	0	34	4
96	MF	(Romania) Dodi Joca	4+1	0	0	0	0	0	0	0	0	0	5	0
97	MF	(Romania) Alin Fica	2	0	0	0	0	0	0	0	0	0	2	0
99	FW	(Venezuela) Mario Rondón	15+9	2	1	0	0	0	6+2	2	1+3	1	37	5
Players who appeared for CFR Cluj that left during the season:
1	GK	(Spain) Jesús Fernández	2	0	1	0	0	0	0	0	0	0	3	0
2	DF	(Romania) Alex Pașcanu	2+2	0	1	0	0	0	0	0	0	0	5	0
4	DF	(Romania) Răzvan Horj	0	0	0	0	0	0	0	0	0	0	0	0
12	GK	(Romania) Cosmin Vâtcă	4	0	0	0	0	0	0	0	0	0	4	0
19	MF	(Argentina) Emmanuel Culio	8+1	4	0	0	0+1	0	4	1	4+2	0	20	5
25	DF	(Romania) Mihai Butean	4	0	1	0	0	0	0	0	0	0	5	0
27	MF	(Romania) Sebastian Mailat	0+1	0	0+1	0	0	0	0+1	0	0	0	3	0
30	DF	(Romania) Andrei Mureșan	7	0	0+1	0	1	0	1+2	0	0	0	12	0
33	GK	(Romania) Adrian Rus	0+1	0	0	0	0	0	0	0	0	0	1	0
77	DF	(Romania) Andrei Peteleu	13	0	0	0	1	0	0	0	3	0	17	0
95	DF	(Romania) Rareș Ispas	0	0	0	0	0	0	0	0	0	0	0	0

=== Squad statistics ===
	Liga I	Cupa României	UEFA Champions League	UEFA Europa League	Home	Away	Total Stats
Games played	36	1	8	8	27	26	53
Games won	22	0	3	4	20	9	29
Games drawn	9	1	2	2	5	9	14
Games lost	5	0	3	2	2	8	10
Goals scored	68	2	11	7	49	39	88
Goals conceded	33	2	10	5	11	29	40
Goal difference	45	0	1	2	38	10	48
Clean sheets	22	0	1	4	17	10	27
Goal by Substitute	0	0	0	0	0	0	0
Total shots	–	–	–	–	–	–	–
Shots on target	–	–	–	–	–	–	–
Corners	–	–	–	–	–	–	–
Players used	–	–	–	–	–	–	–
Offsides	–	–	–	–	–	–	–
Fouls suffered	–	–	–	–	–	–	–
Fouls committed	–	–	–	–	–	–	–
Yellow cards	0	0	0	0	0	0	0
Red cards	0	0	0	0	0	0	0
Winning rate	0%	0%	0%	0%	0%	0%	0%

Last updated: 3 August 2020
Source: Competitive matches

=== Goalscorers ===
As of 3 August 2020

Rank	Position	Name	Liga I	Cupa României	Champions League	Europa League	Total
1	MF	(Romania) Ciprian Deac	14	0	1	3	18
2	FW	(France) Billel Omrani	6	0	6	1	13
3	MF	(Romania) Alexandru Păun	7	0	0	0	7
4	MF	(Argentina) Emmanuel Culio	4	0	1	0	5
5	FW	(Venezuela) Mario Rondón	2	0	2	1	5
6	DF	(Brazil) Paulo Vinícius	5	0	0	0	5
7	FW	(Romania) Valentin Costache	4	0	0	0	4
8	DF	(Romania) Andrei Burcă	2	1	0	1	4
9	MF	(Romania) Cătălin Itu	4	0	0	0	4
10	FW	(Romania) George Țucudean	1	0	1	0	2
11	FW	(Ivory Coast) Lacina Traoré	2	0	0	0	2
12	MF	(Romania) Mihai Bordeianu	2	0	0	0	2
13	MF	(France) Michaël Pereira	2	0	0	0	2
14	DF	(Portugal) Camora	2	0	0	0	2
15	MF	(Croatia) Damjan Djoković	1	0	0	1	2
16	DF	(Bosnia and Herzegovina) Mateo Sušić	2	0	0	0	2
17	DF	(Ivory Coast) Kévin Boli	2	0	0	0	2
18	DF	(Democratic Republic of the Congo) Mike Cestor	1	0	0	0	1
19	MF	(Portugal) Luís Aurélio	1	0	0	0	1
20	MF	(Romania) Ovidiu Hoban	1	0	0	0	1
21	FW	(Romania) Cătălin Golofca	0	1	0	0	1
–	–	Own goal	3	0	0	0	3

=== Goal minutes ===
	1'–15'	16'–30'	31'–HT	46'–60'	61'–75'	76'–FT	Extra time	Forfeit
Goals	16	14	11	11	15	21	0	0
Percentage	18.18%	15.91%	12.5%	12.5%	17.05%	23.86%	0%	0%

Last updated: 3 August 2020
Source: Soccerway

=== Hat-tricks ===
Player	Against	Result	Date	Competition
(France) Omrani	(Kazakhstan) Astana	3–1 (H)	17 July 2019	Champions League

=== Clean sheets ===
As of 3 August 2020

Rank	Name	Liga I	Cupa României	UEFA Champions League	UEFA Europa League	Total	Games played
1	(Lithuania) Giedrius Arlauskis	19	0	1	4	24	45
2	(Romania) Cosmin Vâtcă	1	0	0	0	1	4
3	(Spain) Jesús Fernández	0	0	0	0	0	3
4	(Poland) Grzegorz Sandomierski	1	0	0	0	1	1
5	(Romania) Otto Hindrich	1	0	0	0	1	1
6	(Romania) Adrian Rus	0	0	0	0	0	(1)
Total		22	0	1	4	27	54

=== Disciplinary record ===
N	P	Nat.	Name	Liga I			Cupa României			Supercupa României			UEFA Champions League			UEFA Europa League			Total			Notes
N	P	Nat.	Name	Yellow card	Second yellow card	Red card	Yellow card	Second yellow card	Red card	Yellow card	Second yellow card	Red card	Yellow card	Second yellow card	Red card	Yellow card	Second yellow card	Red card	Yellow card	Second yellow card	Red card	Notes
2	DF	(Romania)	Pașcanu	1															1			
3	DF	(Romania)	Burcă	3			1						2						6			
5	MF	(Mali)	Sylla	2															2			
6	MF	(Portugal)	Aurélio	2									1						3			
7	MF	(Romania)	Păun	4															4			
8	MF	(Croatia)	Djoković	3			1			1			3			3			11			
9	FW	(France)	Omrani	3						1									4			
10	MF	(Romania)	Deac	3									3			1			7			
11	MF	(France)	Pereira	4															4			
12	GK	(Romania)	Vâtcă			1															1	
16	DF	(Bosnia and Herzegovina)	Sušić	1			1						1			1	1		4	1		
18	MF	(Romania)	Costache	5															5			
19	MF	(Argentina)	Culio	2															2			
20	FW	(Romania)	Țucudean										1						1			
21	DF	(Ivory Coast)	Boli			1										1			1		1	
25	DF	(Romania)	Butean	1															1			
27	MF	(Romania)	Chipciu	2															2			
27	MF	(Romania)	Mailat	1	1		1												2	1		
28	MF	(Romania)	Hoban	3	1														3	1		
30	DF	(Romania)	Mureșan										1						1			
37	MF	(Romania)	Bordeianu	8			1	1					2			1	1		12	2		
45	DF	(Portugal)	Camora	1	1					1			1			1			4	1		
55	DF	(Brazil)	Vinícius	2															2			
62	MF	(Romania)	Petrila	2															2			
77	DF	(Romania)	Peteleu	3															3			
87	GK	(Lithuania)	Arlauskis	3									1			2			6			
90	FW	(Ivory Coast)	Traoré	1												2			3			
92	DF	(Democratic Republic of the Congo)	Cestor	4												1			5			
94	MF	(Romania)	Itu	2															2			
99	FW	(Colombia)	Rondón	3									1			1		1	5		1	

Last updated: 3 August 2020
Source: Competitive matches
Only competitive matches
Ordered by (red card) , (second yellow card) and (yellow card)
(yellow card) = Number of bookings; (second yellow card) = Number of sending offs after a second yellow card; (red card) = Number of sending offs by a direct red card.

=== Attendances ===
As of 8 March 2020

	Matches	Attendances	Average	High	Low
Liga I	14	46,630	3,330	9,800	1,500
UEFA Champions League	4	47,493	11,873	15,196	8,092
UEFA Europa League	4	47,999	12,000	14,820	9,222
Total	22	151,922	6,905	15,196	1,500

== See also ==
- 2019–20 Cupa României
- 2019–20 Liga I
