= Cătălin Golofca =

Romanian professional footballer

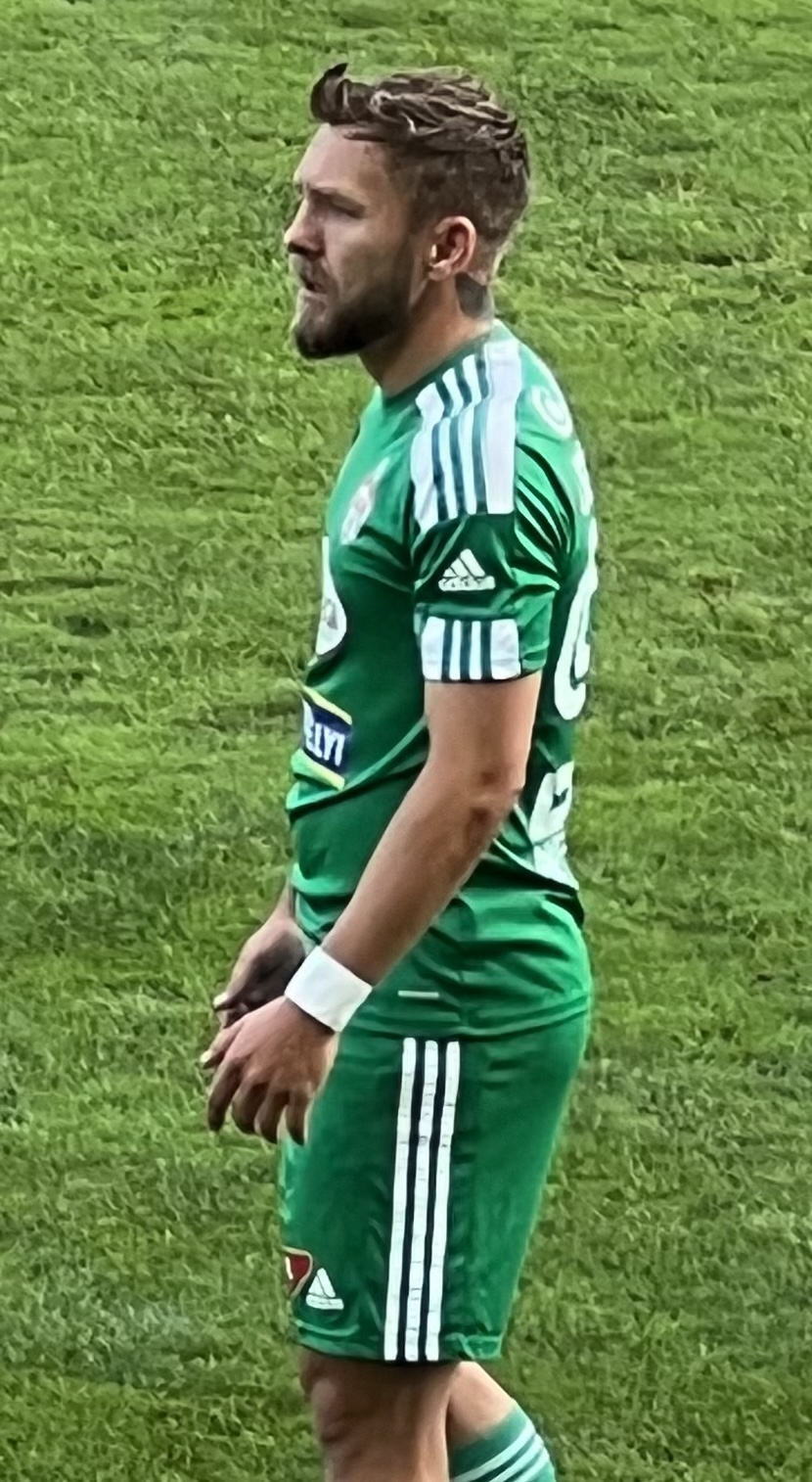
- Golofca playing for Sepsi OSK in 2022

Personal information
- Full name: Cătălin Gheorghiță Golofca
- Date of birth: 21 April 1990 (age 36)
- Place of birth: Suceava, Romania
- Height: 1.69 m (5 ft 7 in)
- Positions: Winger; attacking midfielder

Team information
- Current team: Cetatea Suceava
- Number: 27

Youth career
- –2009: Cetatea Suceava

Senior career*
Years	Team	Apps	(Gls)
2009–2010	CS Gura Humorului	20	(11)
2010–2015	Rapid CFR Suceava	63	(9)
2016–2017	Botoșani	38	(12)
2016	→ Rapid CFR Suceava (loan)	14	(4)
2017–2018	FCSB	8	(0)
2017–2018	→ Botoșani (loan)	17	(2)
2018–2019	Botoșani	45	(8)
2019–2021	CFR Cluj	8	(0)
2020–2021	→ Sepsi OSK (loan)	31	(3)
2021–2022	Sepsi OSK	42	(4)
2023	Botoșani	8	(0)
2023–2024	Chindia Târgoviște	12	(2)
2024	CSM Slatina	12	(1)
2025–	Unirea Alba Iulia	6	(4)
2025–2026	Șoimii Gura Humorului		
2026–	Cetatea Suceava	12	(1)
- * Club domestic league appearances and goals as of 31 October 2026

Cătălin Gheorghiță Golofca (born 21 April 1990) is a Romanian professional footballer who plays as a winger or an attacking midfielder for Liga II club Cetatea Suceava.

== Career ==
=== Early career / Botoșani ===
Golofca joined FC Botoșani of the Romanian first division in January 2016, aged 25, but spent the rest of the 2015–16 season on loan at former club Rapid CFR Suceava. He previously only had stints with lower league teams from his native Suceava County area.

On 5 August 2016, Golofca recorded his Liga I debut in a 2–4 loss to FC Voluntari. Thirtheen days later, he scored his first goal for Botoșani in a 5–0 away thrashing of ACS Poli Timișoara. In his debut campaign at the club, Golofca amassed 34 league appearances and netted nine times.

=== FCSB / Return to Botoșani ===
After scoring three goals in the first four opening games of the 2017–18 Liga I, FCSB announced the signing of Golofca on a four-year deal on 7 August 2017. The capital-based team paid €400,000 for 40% of his economic rights. On the 15th that month he played his first European match, starting in a goalless draw with Sporting CP at the Estádio José Alvalade in the UEFA Champions League play-off round.

Golofca's only goal at FCSB came in a Cupa României 3–0 victory over ACS Poli Timișoara, on 30 November. His poor form and rumours about his nightlife made him fall out of favor and be loaned back to FC Botoșani in the 2018 winter transfer window, eventually rejoining the club on a permanent basis in the summer of that year.

=== CFR Cluj ===
On 30 August 2019, Golofca was transferred by two-time defending champions CFR Cluj for an undisclosed fee. The following day, he made his debut and assisted Adrian Păun's late goal in a 2–3 loss to Astra Giurgiu.

== Style of play ==
Golofca primarily plays as a winger on the right flank, although he has been deployed in the centre as an attacking midfielder or even a main striker on occasion.

== Career statistics ==
As of match played 31 October 2026

Appearances and goals by club, season and competition
Club	Season	League			Cupa României		Cupa Ligii		Continental		Other		Total	
Club	Season	Division	Apps	Goals	Apps	Goals	Apps	Goals	Apps	Goals	Apps	Goals	Apps	Goals
CS Gura Humorului	2009–10	Liga III	20	11	?	?	—		—		—		20	11
Rapid CFR Suceava	2010–11	Liga III	?	?	?	?	—		—		—		?	?
Rapid CFR Suceava	2011–12	Liga III	?	?	?	?	—		—		—		?	?
Rapid CFR Suceava	2012–13	Liga II	4	1	0	0	—		—		—		4	1
Rapid CFR Suceava	2013–14	Liga II	21	2	1	0	—		—		—		22	2
Rapid CFR Suceava	2014–15	Liga II	24	4	3	1	—		—		—		27	5
Rapid CFR Suceava	2015–16	Liga II	29	6	1	0	—		—		—		30	6
Rapid CFR Suceava	Total		78	13	5	1	—		—		—		83	14
Botoșani	2016–17	Liga I	34	9	1	0	2	0	—		—		37	9
Botoșani	2017–18	Liga I	4	3	0	0	—		—		—		4	3
Botoșani	Total		38	12	1	0	2	0	—		—		41	12
FCSB	2017–18	Liga I	8	0	2	1	—		5 (Note: Two appearances in UEFA Champions League, three appearances in UEFA Europa League)	0	—		15	1
FCSB II	2017–18	Liga III	5	5	—		—		—		—		5	5
Botoșani (loan)	2017–18	Liga I	17	2	3	0	—		—		—		20	2
Botoșani	2018–19	Liga I	39	7	1	0	—		—		—		40	7
Botoșani	2019–20	Liga I	6	1	0	0	—		—		—		6	1
Botoșani	Total		62	10	4	0	—		—		—		66	10
CFR Cluj	2019–20	Liga I	7	0	1	1	—		5 (Note: Appearances in UEFA Europa League)	0	—		13	1
CFR Cluj	2020–21	Liga I	1	0	0	0	—		2 (Note: Appearances in UEFA Champions League)	1	—		3	1
CFR Cluj	Total		8	0	1	1	—		7	1	—		16	2
Sepsi OSK (loan)	2020–21	Liga I	31	3	1	0	—		—		1 (Note: Appearance in Liga I play-offs for UEFA Europa Conference League)	0	33	3
Sepsi OSK	2021–22	Liga I	31	2	5	1	—		0	0	—		36	3
Sepsi OSK	2022–23	Liga I	11	2	2	0	—		3 (Note: Appearances in UEFA Europa Conference League)	0	1 (Note: Appearance in Supercupa României)	0	17	2
Sepsi OSK	Total		73	7	8	1	—		3	0	2	0	86	8
Botoșani	2022–23	Liga I	7	0	—		—		—		—		7	0
Botoșani	2023–24	Liga I	1	0	—		—		—		—		1	0
Botoșani	Total		8	0	—		—		—		—		8	0
Chindia Târgoviște	2023–24	Liga II	12	2	3	2	—		—		—		15	4
CSM Slatina	2024–25	Liga II	12	1	1	0	—		—		—		13	1
Unirea Alba Iulia	2024–25	Liga III	6	4	2	0	—		—		2 (Note: Appearances in Liga III promotion play-offs)	0	10	4
Șoimii Gura Humorului	2025–26	Liga III	?	?	3	1	—		—		1	1	4	2
Cetatea Suceava	2026–27	Liga III	12	1	0	0	—		—		—		12	1
Career total			342	66	30	7	2	0	15	1	5	1	393	75

== Honours ==
Rapid CFR Suceava

- Liga III: 2011–12

CFR Cluj

- Liga I: 2019–20, 2020–21

Sepsi OSK

- Cupa României: 2021–22
- Supercupa României: 2022
