= Sebastian Mailat =

Romanian footballer (born 1997)

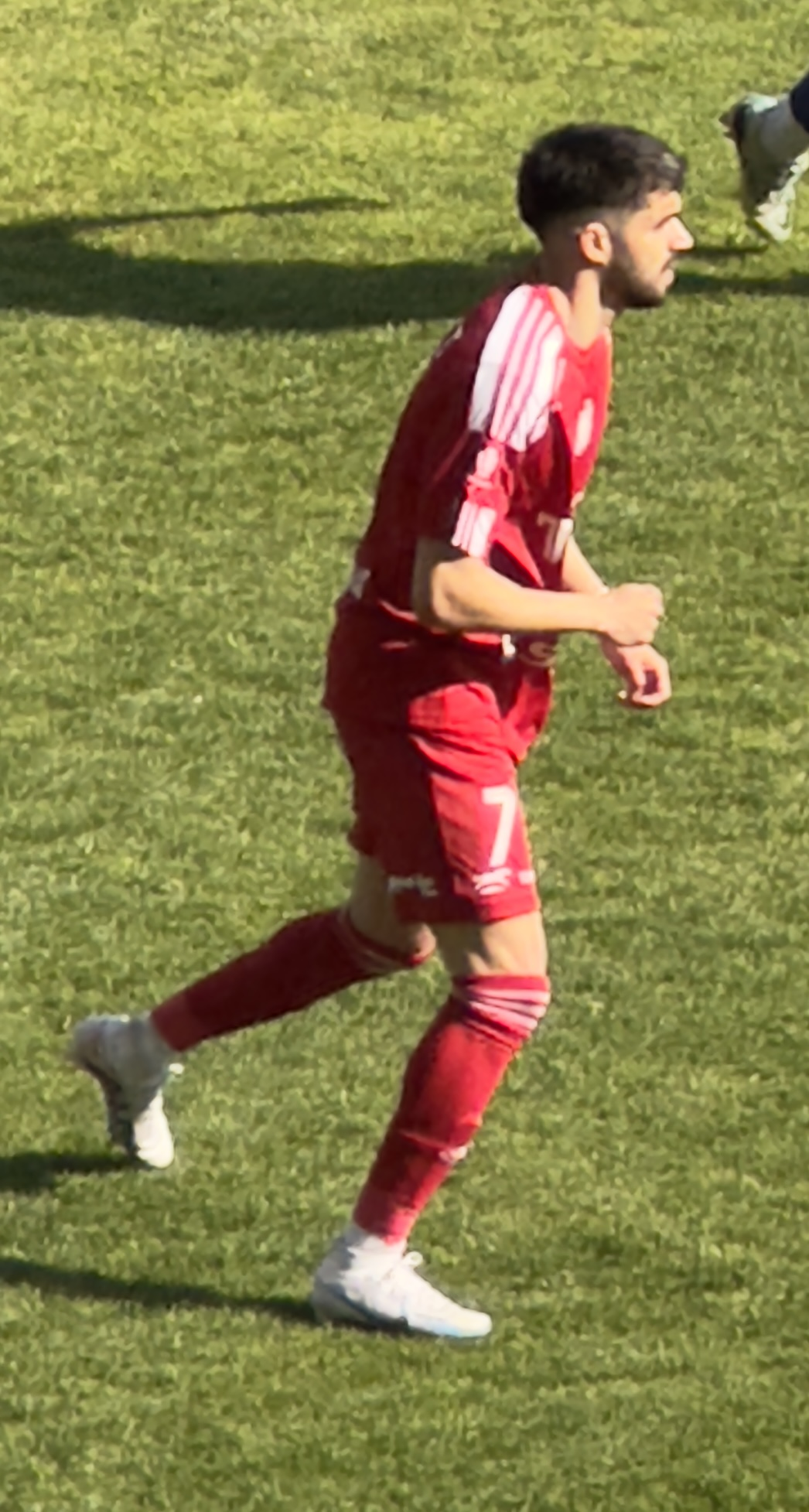
- Mailat with Botoșani in 2023

Personal information
- Full name: Árpád Sebastian Mailat
- Date of birth: 12 December 1997 (age 28)
- Place of birth: Timișoara, Romania
- Height: 1.72 m (5 ft 8 in)
- Position: Winger

Team information
- Current team: Botoșani
- Number: 7

Youth career
- 2010–2015: LPS Banatul Timișoara
- 2015: ACS Poli Timișoara

Senior career*
Years	Team	Apps	(Gls)
2015–2017	ACS Poli Timișoara	38	(6)
2017–2021	CFR Cluj	24	(1)
2019	→ Gaz Metan Mediaș (loan)	18	(0)
2020	→ Universitatea Cluj (loan)	3	(2)
2020–2021	→ Voluntari (loan)	22	(4)
2022–2024	Botoșani	62	(21)
2024	Suwon Samsung Bluewings	10	(2)
2025	Sepsi OSK	13	(1)
2025–	Botoșani	49	(17)

International career
2013–2014	Romania U17	6	(2)
2014–2015	Romania U18	7	(0)
2015–2016	Romania U19	5	(0)
- * Club domestic league appearances and goals as of 1 November 2026

Árpád Sebastian Mailat (born 12 December 1997) is a Romanian professional footballer who plays as a winger for Liga I club Botoșani.

Mailat started out as a senior at his hometown side ACS Poli Timișoara in 2016, and moved to CFR Cluj the following year. He did not impose himself in Cluj-Napoca and was loaned out several times, before signing for Botoșani upon the expiration of his contract in 2022.

Internationally, Mailat represented Romania at under-17, under-18 and under-19 levels.

== Club career ==
=== Early career and ACS Poli Timișoara ===
Mailat first came to prominence at age 12, when he won an award for being the most technically gifted player in his age group at a national competition organised by Gheorghe Hagi. After playing as a junior for LPS Banatul Timișoara, he attracted the attention of Steaua București in the summer of 2015, but ultimately chose to sign for his hometown club ACS Poli Timișoara.

On 26 May 2016, Mailat made his professional debut in the Liga I and scored a long-range goal in a 2–3 loss to CSM Studențesc Iași.

=== CFR Cluj ===
On 12 November 2017, aged 19, Mailat agreed to a four-year contract with fellow league team CFR Cluj. He made his debut 15 days later, coming on as a 66th-minute substitute for Adrian Păun in a 2–0 Liga I victory over Sepsi OSK. Mailat totalled 13 appearances and scored one goal for "the White-Burgundies" in the 2017–18 season, as they clinched their fourth championship in their history.

On 14 July 2018, he started in the 1–0 win against Universitatea Craiova in the Supercupa României. On 1 August 2018, Mailat registered his European debut by coming on for Ciprian Deac in the 43rd minute of a UEFA Champions League second qualifying round game with Malmö FF (1–1 home draw, 1–2 loss on aggregate). On the 16th that month, he scored in a 5–0 thrashing of Alashkert in the Europa League third qualifying round.

==== Various loans ====
On 11 January 2019, Mailat joined Gaz Metan Mediaș on loan for the remainder of the season. The next January, he moved to the Liga II with Universitatea Cluj also on loan, but only made three appearances for CFR's city rivals.

On 25 August 2020, Mailat agreed to a campaign-long loan with Voluntari, for which he amassed 25 games and four goals in all competitions.

=== Botoșani ===
On 4 January 2022, Botoșani owner Valeriu Iftime announced the signing of Mailat as a free agent. He made his debut in a 1–0 win against Sepsi OSK on the 20th that month, and scored his only goal of the season in a 5–0 defeat of his former team Gaz Metan Mediaș on 14 March.

On 18 July 2022, Mailat scored his first career double in a 3–2 home win over Chindia Târgoviște in the campaign's opener. He repeated the performance in a 2–3 home loss to FCSB, on 1 December that year. On 20 May 2023, he netted his sixth brace of the season in a 5–1 win against Mioveni, taking his final tally to 16 goals in 36 league matches.

== Career statistics ==
As of match played 1 November 2026

Appearances and goals by club, season and competition
Club	Season	League			Cupa României		Cupa Ligii		Continental		Other		Total	
Club	Season	Division	Apps	Goals	Apps	Goals	Apps	Goals	Apps	Goals	Apps	Goals	Apps	Goals
ACS Poli Timișoara	2015–16	Liga I	1	1	0	0	0	0	—		—		1	1
ACS Poli Timișoara	2016–17	Liga I	23	3	3	0	1	0	—		2 (Note: Appearances in Liga I promotion/relegation play-offs)	0	29	3
ACS Poli Timișoara	2017–18	Liga I	14	2	1	0	—		—		—		15	2
ACS Poli Timișoara	Total		38	6	4	0	1	0	—		2	0	45	6
CFR Cluj	2017–18	Liga I	13	1	0	0	—		—		—		13	1
CFR Cluj	2018–19	Liga I	10	0	1	0	—		5 (Note: One appearance in UEFA Champions League, four appearances and one goal in UEFA Europa League)	1	1 (Note: Appearance in Supercupa României)	0	17	1
CFR Cluj	2019–20	Liga I	1	0	1	0	—		1 (Note: Appearance in UEFA Champions League)	0	—		3	0
CFR Cluj	Total		24	1	2	0	—		6	1	1	0	33	2
Gaz Metan Mediaș (loan)	2018–19	Liga I	18	0	0	0	—		—		—		18	0
Universitatea Cluj (loan)	2019–20	Liga II	3	2	—		—		—		—		3	2
Voluntari (loan)	2020–21	Liga I	22	4	1	0	—		—		2	0	25	4
Botoșani	2021–22	Liga I	17	1	—		—		—		1 (Note: Appearances in Liga I European play-offs)	0	18	1
Botoșani	2022–23	Liga I	36	16	2	1	—		—		—		38	17
Botoșani	2023–24	Liga I	7	3	0	0	—		—		2	1	9	4
Botoșani	2024–25	Liga I	2	1	—		—		—		—		2	1
Botoșani	Total		62	21	2	1	—		0	0	3	1	67	23
Suwon Samsung Bluewings	2024	K League 2	10	2	—		—		—		—		10	2
Sepsi OSK	2024–25	Liga I	13	1	—		—		—		—		13	1
Botoșani	2025–26	Liga I	38	13	1	0	—		—		1	2	40	15
Botoșani	2026–27	Liga I	11	4	0	0	—		—		—		11	4
Botoșani	Total		49	17	1	0	—		—		1	2	51	19
Career total			239	54	10	1	1	0	6	1	9	3	265	59

== Honours ==
ACS Poli Timișoara

- Cupa Ligii runner-up: 2016–17

CFR Cluj

- Liga I: 2017–18, 2018–19, 2019–20
- Supercupa României: 2018
