= Paulo Vinícius (footballer, born 1984) =

Brazilian footballer

Personal information
- Full name: Paulo Vinícius de Souza Nascimento
- Date of birth: 12 August 1984 (age 42)
- Place of birth: Cuiabá, Brazil
- Height: 1.87 m (6 ft 2 in)
- Position: Defender

Youth career
- 1997–2003: Cuiabá

Senior career*
Years	Team	Apps	(Gls)
2003–2004	Cuiabá	5	(0)
2003	→ Operário Ltda (loan)	2	(0)
2005–2008	Grêmio Anápolis	31	(3)
2005	→ Mixto (loan)	11	(1)
2006–2007	→ Santa Clara (loan)	29	(1)
2007–2008	→ Leixões (loan)	2	(0)
2008	→ Olhanense (loan)	14	(2)
2008–2011	União Leiria	76	(5)
2011–2014	Braga	39	(4)
2014–2015	Operário Ltda	2	(0)
2015–2016	Boavista	32	(2)
2016–2017	Apollon Limassol	33	(6)
2017–2021	CFR Cluj	115	(15)
2021–2022	FCSB	25	(2)
Total		416	(41)
- * Club domestic league appearances and goals

Paulo Vinícius de Souza Nascimento (born 12 August 1984), known as Paulo Vinícius, is a Brazilian former professional footballer who played as a defender. He could occupy all three defensive positions.

He spent the vast majority of his career in Portugal, amassing Primeira Liga totals of 126 matches and nine goals in representation of four clubs. In 2017 he signed with CFR Cluj in Romania, where he won several club and individual honours.

== Club career ==
=== Portugal ===
Born in Cuiabá, Mato Grosso, Vinícius only played lower league football in his country. In 2006 he signed with Portuguese club Santa Clara, making his debut in the Segunda Liga on 27 August in a 1–0 away win against Portimonense where he played the full 90 minutes. He scored his first goal of the season on 14 January 2007, but in a 2–1 loss at Gil Vicente.

Remaining in the country, Vinícius joined Leixões in the summer of 2007. His first match in the Primeira Liga took place on 3 November of that year, when he came on as a late substitute in the 3–0 home victory over Braga. During the 2008 January transfer window, still owned by Grêmio Anápolis, he moved to Olhanense.

Vinícius signed for União de Leiria for 2008–09, netting twice during the campaign to help his team return to the top division after a one-year absence. In the following years he continued to be regularly used, notably scoring in a 1–0 away defeat of Sporting CP on 12 December 2009.

Subsequently, and save for a short spell back in his country with amateurs Operário, Vinícius continued to compete in the Portuguese top tier, featuring regularly at Braga but also dealing with injury problems and starting at Boavista. He helped the former side win the 2012–13 edition of the Taça da Liga notably playing the entire semi-final against Benfica where they emerged victorious after a penalty shootout.

=== Apollon ===
In the summer of 2016, the 32-year-old Vinícius joined Apollon Limassol from the Cypriot First Division. He scored a career-best six goals in his only season, also finding the net in the final of the domestic cup where his team defeated APOEL 1–0.

=== Romania ===
Vinícius signed for Romanian team CFR Cluj in June 2017. He scored his first goal on 14 August, helping to a 2–0 Liga I away victory over Sepsi OSK. On 10 February 2018, he opened a 1–1 draw with title contenders FCSB, being an undisputed starter in his first year as the club won the fourth national championship in its history.

Vinícius left Cluj-Napoca in the summer of 2021 upon the expiration of his contract, after winning the national title in every possible season as well as two Supercupa României. On 27 July that year, aged nearly 37, he agreed to a one-year deal with FCSB. His first goal came in a 6–0 derby rout of Dinamo București on 12 September.

== Career statistics ==
Appearances and goals by club, season and competition
Club	Season	League			National cup (Note: Includes Taça de Portugal, Cupa României)		League cup (Note: Includes Taça da Liga)		Continental		Other		Total	
Club	Season	Division	Apps	Goals	Apps	Goals	Apps	Goals	Apps	Goals	Apps	Goals	Apps	Goals
Operário Ltda (loan)	2003	Brazilian Football Confederation	2	0	0	0	—		—		—		2	0
Santa Clara (loan)	2006–07	Liga de Honra	29	1	0	0	—		—		—		29	1
Leixões (loan)	2007–08	Primeira Liga	2	0	0	0	0	0	—		—		2	0
Olhanense (loan)	2007–08	Liga de Honra	14	2	—		—		—		—		14	2
União Leiria	2008–09	Liga de Honra	24	1	0	0	3	0	—		—		27	1
União Leiria	2009–10	Primeira Liga	30	2	1	0	4	1	—		—		35	3
União Leiria	2010–11	Primeira Liga	23	1	1	0	2	0	—		—		26	1
União Leiria	Total		77	4	2	0	9	1	—		—		88	5
Braga	2011–12	Primeira Liga	11	2	2	0	0	0	7 (Note: Appearances in UEFA Europa League)	1	—		20	3
Braga	2012–13	Primeira Liga	20	1	2	0	3	0	6 (Note: Appearances in UEFA Champions League)	0	—		31	1
Braga	2013–14	Primeira Liga	8	1	2	0	0	0	0	0	—		10	1
Braga	Total		39	4	6	0	3	0	13	1	—		61	5
Operário Ltda	2014–15	Brazilian Football Confederation	2	0	0	0	—		—		—		2	0
Boavista	2015–16	Primeira Liga	32	2	2	0	0	0	—		—		34	2
Apollon Limassol	2016–17	Cypriot First Division	33	6	0	0	—		2	1	1 (Note: Appearance in Cypriot Super Cup)	0	36	7
CFR Cluj	2017–18	Liga I	34	5	0	0	—		—		—		34	5
CFR Cluj	2018–19	Liga I	31	2	1	0	—		6 (Note: Two appearances in UEFA Champions League, four appearances in UEFA Europa League)	0	1 (Note: Appearance in Supercupa României)	0	39	2
CFR Cluj	2019–20	Liga I	25	5	0	0	—		8 (Note: Six appearances in UEFA Champions League, two appearances in UEFA Europa League)	0	1	0	34	5
CFR Cluj	2020–21	Liga I	25	3	0	0	—		7 (Note: Two appearances in UEFA Champions League, five appearances and one goal in UEFA Europa League)	1	0	0	32	4
CFR Cluj	Total		115	15	1	0	—		21	1	2	0	139	16
FCSB	2021–22	Liga I	25	2	0	0	—		0	0	—		25	2
Career total			370	36	11	0	12	1	36	3	3	0	432	40

== Honours ==
Braga

- Taça da Liga: 2012–13

Apollon Limassol

- Cypriot Cup: 2016–17
- Cypriot Super Cup: 2016

CFR Cluj

- Liga I: 2017–18, 2018–19, 2019–20, 2020–21
- Supercupa României: 2018, 2020

Individual

- Foreign Player of the Year in Romania (Gazeta Sporturilor): 2020
- Liga I Team of the Season: 2017–18, 2018–19, 2019–20
- Liga I Team of the Regular Season: 2018–19
- Liga I Team of the Championship Play-offs: 2017–18, 2018–19
