= Andrei Joca =

Romanian footballer

Personal information
- Full name: Andrei Dodi Joca
- Date of birth: 22 June 2000 (age 26)
- Place of birth: Baia Mare, Romania
- Height: 1.81 m (5 ft 11 in)
- Position: Right winger

Youth career
- –2018: Electrica Baia Mare
- 2018–2019: CFR Cluj

Senior career*
Years	Team	Apps	(Gls)
2019–2022	CFR Cluj	10	(0)
2019–2022	CFR II Cluj	27	(3)
2021–2022	Gloria Bistrița (loan)	20	(3)
- * Club domestic league appearances and goals as of 08:37, 21 June 2022 (UTC)

Andrei Dodi Joca (born 22 June 2000) is a Romanian professional footballer who plays as a right winger.

== Honours ==
CFR Cluj

- Liga I: 2019–20, 2020–21
- Supercupa României: 2020
