= Adrià Gallego =

Spanish footballer

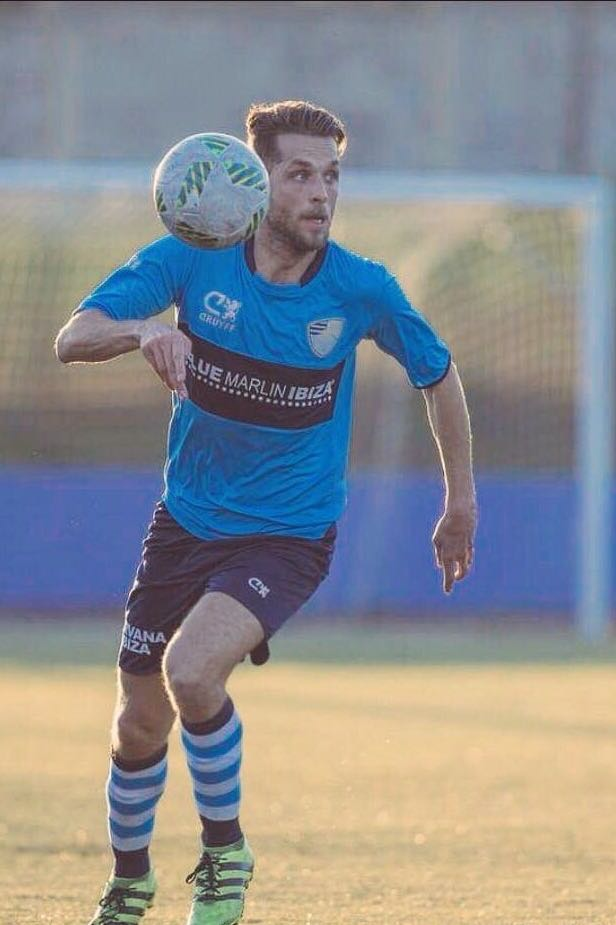

Personal information
- Full name: Adrià Gallego Arias
- Date of birth: 9 April 1990 (age 36)
- Place of birth: Lleida, Spain
- Height: 1.84 m (6 ft 1/2 in)
- Position: Right back

Team information
- Current team: Atlètic d'Escaldes
- Number: 49

Senior career*
Years	Team	Apps	(Gls)
2010–2011	Lleida	32	(4)
2011–2013	Deportivo B	4	(0)
2013–2014	Binéfar		
2014–2015	Castellón		
2015–2016	Portugalete	15	(0)
2016	Ascó		
2016	Storm		
2017–2018	Atlético Saguntino	32	(2)
2018–2020	Politehnica Iași	36	(1)
2021–2025	Inter d'Escaldes	84	(8)
2025–	Atlètic d'Escaldes	22	(1)
- * Club domestic league appearances and goals as of 10 June 2026

Adrià Gallego Arias (born 9 April 1990) is a Spanish professional footballer who plays as a right back for Andorran club Atlètic d'Escaldes.

== Club career ==
Born in Lleida, Catalonia, Gallego never played any higher than Segunda División B in Spain, with a season each for hometown club UE Lleida (dissolved at the end of 2010–11), Club Portugalete and Atlético Saguntino.

=== Politehnica Iași ===
In June 2018, Gallego left Saguntino and joined Romanian team FC Politehnica Iași on a free transfer. He later signed a two-year deal with the Liga I squad. On 23 July, he made his Liga I debut for Politehnica in a 0–0 draw against Universitatea Craiova. After taking a salary reduction to stay on at the cash-strapped club for one more season, he scored his only goal on 28 October 2019, to decide a 2–1 home win over CFR Cluj.

=== Inter Club d'Escaldes ===
On 5 February 2021, Gallego signed for Inter Club d'Escaldes of the Andorran Primera Divisió.
