= Michaël Pereira =

French footballer (born 1987)

Personal information
- Full name: Michaël Pereira
- Date of birth: 8 December 1987 (age 38)
- Place of birth: Livry-Gargan, France
- Height: 1.80 m (5 ft 11 in)
- Position: Winger

Youth career
- 2007–2008: Blanc Mesnil Sport

Senior career*
Years	Team	Apps	(Gls)
2008–2009	Alfortville	28	(11)
2009–2010	Mallorca B	33	(5)
2010–2016	Mallorca	163	(14)
2013–2014	→ Granada (loan)	18	(0)
2016–2019	Yeni Malatyaspor	78	(10)
2019–2021	CFR Cluj	37	(2)
2021–2022	Kocaelispor	28	(3)
2022–2023	Wisła Kraków	5	(0)
2023	Apollon Smyrnis	16	(0)
2023–2024	Athens Kallithea	8	(1)
Total		414	(46)
- * Club domestic league appearances and goals

Michaël Pereira (born 8 December 1987) is a French professional former footballer who played as a winger.

== Club career ==
=== Early years ===
Pereira was born in Livry-Gargan, Seine-Saint-Denis of Cape Verdean descent. He finished his development at Le Blanc-Mesnil Sport in the commune of Le Blanc-Mesnil, competing with them in the Division d'Honneur, the sixth division of French football. In 2008, he joined UJA Alfortville in the Championnat de France amateur and, midway through the league campaign, met his agent, who exclaimed: "With the connections I have, you can have a bright future."; the player subsequently hired him, and went on to have a successful season with the latter club, appearing in 29 official games and scoring 12 goals.

=== Mallorca ===
Afterwards, Pereira went on trials with teams in France and Spain, most notably AJ Auxerre, US Boulogne, Deportivo de La Coruña and RCD Mallorca. While trialing with the Galicians during the 2008–09 season, he was invited by the president to attend a match between the hosts and FC Barcelona; however, after contemplating the decision, he decided to join Mallorca citing better opportunities.

Pereira spent his first season with the Balearic Islands side in the Segunda División B, helping the reserves to a final seventh place after promotion. Late into the campaign he was invited to practice with the first team, being included in the squad to play against CA Osasuna – hours before the match, he was offered a professional contract by club officials and was told "to be pro is what you dreamed your whole life, right? If you sign, you're playing tonight, otherwise not." However, despite the contract being professional, it still contained the same conditions of an amateur one; he subsequently turned down the offer and was an unused substitute in that fixture. The discussions continued the following day, but he remained steadfast on his decision and went two months without featuring in a competitive match.

In August 2010, following an ownership change the previous month, Pereira signed his first professional contract, agreeing to a four-year deal. On the 29th he made his first-team and La Liga debut, replacing Víctor Casadesús in 2010–11's opener, a 0–0 home draw against Real Madrid. During his first year he was first-choice right winger, also finishing as one of the side's top scorers at five goals.

On 3 September 2013, Pereira was loaned to fellow top-flight Granada CF in a season-long move. Mainly a backup, he helped the Andalusians narrowly avoid relegation.

Pereira renewed his link with Mallorca on 21 August 2014, running until 2016.

=== Malatyaspor ===
On 15 July 2016, Pereira left for Turkey and signed with Yeni Malatyaspor. He scored six goals in 30 matches in his first season, as the club reached the Süper Lig for the first time in its history.

=== CFR Cluj ===
On 28 June 2019, Pereira joined CFR Cluj in the Romanian Liga I. He always won the national championship during his spell, totalling 49 appearances, three goals and five assists.

=== Later career ===
Pereira settled rarely the following seasons, representing in quick succession, Kocaelispor (Turkish TFF First League), Wisła Kraków (Poland, I liga), Apollon Smyrnis F.C. and Athens Kallithea FC (Super League Greece 2).

== Career statistics ==
As of 11 June 2023

Club	Season	League		Cup		Continental		Other		Total	
Club	Season	Apps	Goals	Apps	Goals	Apps	Goals	Apps	Goals	Apps	Goals
Alfortville	2008–09	26	11	3	1	—		—		29	12
Alfortville	2009–10	2	0	0	0	—		—		2	0
Alfortville	Total	28	11	3	1	—		—		31	12
Mallorca B	2009–10	33	5	—		—		—		33	5
Mallorca	2010–11	35	5	3	0	—		—		38	5
Mallorca	2011–12	30	3	2	0	—		—		32	3
Mallorca	2012–13	25	1	2	0	—		—		27	1
Mallorca	2013–14	2	0	0	0	—		—		2	0
Mallorca	2014–15	36	1	1	0	—		—		37	1
Mallorca	2015–16	35	4	0	0	—		—		35	4
Mallorca	Total	163	14	8	0	—		—		171	14
Granada (loan)	2013–14	18	0	2	0	—		—		20	0
Yeni Malatyaspor	2016–17	30	6	1	0	—		—		31	6
Yeni Malatyaspor	2017–18	25	4	2	0	—		—		27	4
Yeni Malatyaspor	2018–19	23	0	6	1	—		—		29	1
Yeni Malatyaspor	Total	78	10	9	1	—		—		87	11
CFR Cluj	2019–20	16	2	0	0	2	0	—		18	2
CFR Cluj	2020–21	21	0	0	0	10	1	—		31	1
CFR Cluj	Total	37	2	0	0	12	1	—		49	3
Kocaelispor	2021–22	28	3	1	1	—		—		29	4
Wisła Kraków	2022–23	5	0	1	0	—		—		6	0
Apollon Smyrnis	2022–23	16	0	—		—		—		16	0
Career total		406	45	24	3	12	1	0	0	442	49

== Honours ==
CFR Cluj

- Liga I: 2019–20, 2020–21
