= Luís Aurélio =

Portuguese footballer

Personal information
- Full name: Luís Miguel Coimbra Aurélio
- Date of birth: 17 August 1988 (age 38)
- Place of birth: Beja, Portugal
- Height: 1.79 m (5 ft 10 in)
- Position: Midfielder

Team information
- Current team: Castrense

Youth career
- 1996–2002: Desportivo Beja
- 2002–2007: Despertar

Senior career*
Years	Team	Apps	(Gls)
2007–2008	Castrense		
2008–2009	Santana	30	(3)
2009–2010	Moreirense	29	(1)
2010–2011	Atlético Reguengos	4	(0)
2011–2013	Tondela	53	(9)
2013–2014	Moreirense	24	(2)
2015–2016	Nacional	46	(5)
2016–2018	Feirense	54	(0)
2018–2019	Gaz Metan Mediaș	36	(1)
2019–2021	CFR Cluj	22	(1)
2022	Académica	3	(0)
2023–	Castrense	61	(10)
- * Club domestic league appearances and goals as of 20:57, 18 May 2026 (UTC)

Luís Miguel Coimbra Aurélio (born 17 August 1988) is a Portuguese professional footballer who plays as a midfielder for FC Castrense.

== Club career ==
Born in Beja, Aurélio played his early years as a senior in the lower leagues, starting with FC Castrense in the regional championships then representing, in quick succession, U.D. Santana, Moreirense FC, Atlético S.C. and C.D. Tondela in the third division. In the 2011–12 season, with the latter club, he contributed 23 games and one goal as it promoted to the second tier for the first time ever.

Aurélio made his professional debut on 12 August 2012, playing the first half of a 2–2 home draw against FC Porto B. He scored a career-best eight goals in that campaign, helping the team easily retain their newly acquired status; highlights included a hat-trick in the 3–0 away victory over S.C. Braga B on 3 February 2013.

In the 2013 off-season, Aurélio returned to Moreirense who now competed in division two. He netted twice in 19 starts in his first year, in a return to the Primeira Liga after a one-year absence.

Aurélio's maiden appearance in the Portuguese top flight took place on 21 September 2014, when he came as a 68th-minute substitute in a 3–1 away loss to S.L. Benfica. It was to be one of only two competitive matches for the Guimarães-based side, as in January 2015 he left to sign with C.D. Nacional.

In his first full season in Madeira, Aurélio scored three times from 28 games, helping to an 11th-place finish. In the following summer, the free agent joined C.D. Feirense also in the top division.

Aurélio spent the following years in the Romanian Liga I, with CS Gaz Metan Mediaș and CFR Cluj.

== International career ==
In April 2009, whilst at Santana, Aurélio was called to the Portugal under-21 side by manager Rui Caçador. He never won any caps at any level, however.

== Personal life ==
Aurélio's twin brother, João, was also a footballer and a midfielder. He played most of his career with Nacional, where they shared teams.

== Honours ==
Moreirense

- Segunda Liga: 2013–14

CFR Cluj

- Liga I: 2019–20, 2020–21
