= Răzvan Andronic =

Romanian footballer

Personal information
- Date of birth: 7 January 2000 (age 26)
- Place of birth: Cluj-Napoca, Romania
- Height: 1.78 m (5 ft 10 in)
- Position: Right midfielder

Youth career
- –2018: Ardealul Cluj
- 2018–2019: Botoșani

Senior career*
Years	Team	Apps	(Gls)
2019–2020	Botoșani	8	(1)
2020–2022	CFR Cluj	0	(0)
2020–2021	→ Academica Clinceni (loan)	22	(2)
2022	FC Brașov	4	(0)

International career^{‡}
2018	Romania U18	2	(0)
- * Club domestic league appearances and goals as of 08:13, 22 June 2022 (UTC) ‡ National team caps and goals as of 4 July 2018

Răzvan Andronic (born 7 January 2000) is a Romanian professional footballer who plays as a midfielder.

== Club career ==
=== Botoșani ===
On 7 September 2018, Andronic joined Liga I side Botoșani. He made his senior debut in Liga I for Botoșani in a game against FCSB, game which Botoșani managed to win with 2–0. He also scored in his first official game against FCSB.He scored the first goal in the 18th minute from a pass from Aškovski.

=== CFR Cluj ===
After some good performances at Botoșani, CFR Cluj transferred Andronic on 10 February 2020.
