= Mihai Bordeianu =

Romanian footballer (born 1991)

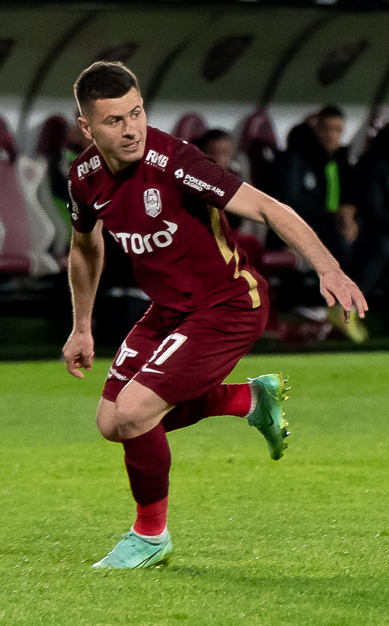
- Bordeianu with CFR Cluj in 2022

Personal information
- Full name: Mihai Cătălin Bordeianu
- Date of birth: 18 November 1991 (age 34)
- Place of birth: Flămânzi, Romania
- Height: 1.75 m (5 ft 9 in)
- Position: Midfielder

Team information
- Current team: Botoșani
- Number: 37

Youth career
- 2001–2003: Ceahlăul Piatra Neamț
- 2003–2004: Botoșani
- 2005–2009: Liberty Salonta
- 2008–2009: Ceahlăul Piatra Neamț

Senior career*
Years	Team	Apps	(Gls)
2009–2017	Botoșani	107	(4)
2012–2014	→ Dorohoi (loan)	50	(11)
2018–2020	CFR Cluj	57	(3)
2020–2021	Al-Qadsiah	14	(0)
2021	→ CFR Cluj (loan)	12	(0)
2021–2023	CFR Cluj	44	(1)
2023	Universitatea Cluj	2	(0)
2023–2025	Politehnica Iași	64	(6)
2025–	Botoșani	35	(1)

International career^{‡}
2019–2022	Romania	4	(0)
- * Club domestic league appearances and goals as of 10 October 2026 ‡ National team caps and goals as of 29 March 2022

Mihai Cătălin Bordeianu (born 18 November 1991) is a Romanian professional footballer who plays as a midfielder for Liga I club Botoșani.

== International career ==
Bordeianu made his Romania national team debut on 8 September 2019 in a Euro 2020 qualifier against Malta. He started the game and played the whole match.

== Career statistics ==
=== Club ===
As of 27 October 2026

Appearances and goals by club, season and competition
Club	Season	League			National cup (Note: Includes Cupa României, King's Cup)		Continental		Other		Total	
Club	Season	Division	Apps	Goals	Apps	Goals	Apps	Goals	Apps	Goals	Apps	Goals
Botoșani	2009–10	Liga II	24	1	0	0	—		—		12	0
Botoșani	2010–11	Liga II	0	0	0	0	—		—		0	0
Botoșani	2011–12	Liga II	5	0	0	0	—		—		5	0
Botoșani	2014–15	Liga I	9	0	1	0	—		1 (Note: Appearance in Cupa Ligii)	0	11	0
Botoșani	2015–16	Liga I	23	1	2	0	0	0	1	0	26	0
Botoșani	2016–17	Liga I	28	1	1	0	—		2	0	31	1
Botoșani	2017–18	Liga I	18	1	2	0	—		—		20	1
Botoșani	Total		107	4	6	0	0	0	4	0	117	4
Dorohoi (loan)	2011–12	Liga III	?	?	—		—		—		?	?
Dorohoi (loan)	2012–13	Liga III	?	?	1	1	—		—		?	?
Dorohoi (loan)	2013–14	Liga III	?	?	2	0	—		—		?	?
Dorohoi (loan)	Total		50	11	3	1	—		—		53	12
CFR Cluj	2017–18	Liga I	6	0	—		—		—		6	0
CFR Cluj	2018–19	Liga I	26	1	3	0	5 (Note: One appearance in UEFA Champions League, four appearances in UEFA Europa League)	0	0	0	34	1
CFR Cluj	2019–20	Liga I	21	2	1	0	16 (Note: Eight appearances in UEFA Champions League, eight appearances in UEFA Europa League)	0	1 (Note: Appearance in Supercupa României)	0	39	2
CFR Cluj	2020–21	Liga I	4	0	—		3 (Note: One appearance in UEFA Champions League, two appearances in UEFA Europa League)	0	0	0	7	0
CFR Cluj	Total		57	3	4	0	24	0	1	0	86	3
Al-Qadsiah	2020–21	Saudi Pro League	14	0	1	0	—		—		15	0
CFR Cluj (loan)	2020–21	Liga I	12	0	—		—		—		12	0
CFR Cluj	2021–22	Liga I	31	1	0	0	6 (Note: Appearances in UEFA Conference League)	0	—		37	1
CFR Cluj	2022–23	Liga I	13	0	4	0	6 (Note: Two appearance in UEFA Champions League, four appearances in UEFA Conference League)	0	1	0	24	0
CFR Cluj	Total		56	1	4	0	12	0	1	0	73	1
Universitatea Cluj	2023–24	Liga I	2	0	—		—		—		2	0
Politehnica Iași	2023–24	Liga I	29	0	1	0	—		—		30	0
Politehnica Iași	2024–25	Liga I	35	6	2	1	—		2 (Note: Appearances in Liga I promotion/relegation play-offs)	0	39	7
Politehnica Iași	Total		64	6	3	1	—		2	0	69	7
Botoșani	2025–26	Liga I	31	1	2	0	—		0	0	33	1
Botoșani	2026–27	Liga I	4	0	3	0	—		—		7	0
Botoșani	Total		35	1	5	0	—		0	0	40	1
Career total			385	26	26	2	36	0	8	0	455	28

=== International ===
As of match played 29 March 2022

Appearances and goals by national team and year
National team	Year	Apps	Goals
Romania	2019	2	0
Romania	2020	0	0
Romania	2021	0	0
Romania	2022	2	0
Total		4	0

== Honours ==
Dorohoi

- Liga III: 2013–14

CFR Cluj

- Liga I: 2017–18, 2018–19, 2019–20, 2020–21, 2021–22
- Supercupa României: 2018, 2020
