= Cosmin Vâtcă =

Romanian footballer

Personal information
- Full name: Cosmin Andrei Vâtcă
- Date of birth: 12 May 1982 (age 44)
- Place of birth: Turda, Romania
- Height: 1.84 m (6 ft 0 in)
- Position: Goalkeeper

Team information
- Current team: Mediaș (Manager)

Youth career
- CSȘ Turda
- Școala de Fotbal Ștefan Kovács
- Viitorul Oradea

Senior career*
Years	Team	Apps	(Gls)
2001–2005	Bihor Oradea	45	(0)
2006–2007	Oțelul Galați	48	(0)
2007–2010	Steaua București	0	(0)
2009–2010	→ Gaz Metan Mediaș (loan)	25	(0)
2010–2011	Gaz Metan Mediaș	7	(0)
2012	Rapid București	3	(0)
2012–2014	Viitorul Constanța	21	(0)
2014	Gaz Metan Mediaș	0	(0)
2014–2018	CFR Cluj	21	(0)
2018–2019	Voluntari	28	(0)
2019–2020	CFR Cluj	4	(0)
2020	Universitatea Cluj	3	(0)
2021–2022	1599 Șelimbăr	7	(0)
Total		212	(0)

Managerial career
- 2023–2024: Voința Sibiu
- 2024: Mediaș
- 2025-: Mediaș
- * Club domestic league appearances and goals as of 08:56, 8 November 2024 (UTC) ‡ National team caps and goals as of 2 April 2009

Cosmin Andrei Vâtcă (born 12 May 1982), is a Romanian footballer who plays as a goalkeeper.

== Club career ==
Vâtcă began his career in his home town of Turda at CSS Turda. The first important club for which he played was FC Bihor. He made his debut in Liga I (then Divizia A), on 2 May 2004, in a match against Steaua București. He signed for €12,000 with Oțelul Galați in January 2006. The first match he played for Oțelul Galați was the shocking 3–0 away win against Dinamo București.

He has the reputation of a good goalkeeper, with very good reflexes who sometimes makes mistakes. In the 2006–2007 season, he made 33 appearances in Liga I for Oțelul Galați, having conceded 54 goals. He joined Steaua București in the summer of 2007 for €550,000, but he did not play in any matches during the 2007/2008 season of Liga I. He played in two Romanian Cup matches, against FCM Bacău (4-0) and Unirea Urziceni (0-2).

Oțelul Galați wanted to sign him back after the competitional break started. Oțelul Galați's goalkeepers, Ismail Kouha, Paulius Grybauskas and Valentin Borș have had some bad evolutions, which made the team's board to turn their attention to Vâtcă. But, the team's president, Marius Stan, dismissed all speculation and said that Oţelul would not buy back Vâtcă. After his contract with Steaua ended, he signed with Gaz Metan Mediaș as a free agent.

In January 2012, he signed a contract for three years with Rapid București.

== Honours ==
=== Club ===
CFR Cluj

- Liga I: 2017–18, 2018–19, 2019–20
- Cupa României: 2015–16
- Supercupa României: 2018

Viitorul Șelimbăr

- Liga III: 2020–21
