= 2019–20 Liga I =

102nd season of top-tier football league in Romania

Liga I
- Season: 2019–20
- Dates: 12 July 2019 – 5 August 2020
- Champions: CFR Cluj; 6th title
- Champions League: CFR Cluj
- UEFA Europa League: Universitatea Craiova; Botoșani; FCSB
- Matches: 261
- Goals: 520 (1.99 per match)
- Top goalscorer: Gabriel Iancu (18 goals)
- Best goalkeeper: Giedrius Arlauskis (16 clean sheets)
- Biggest home win: Viitorul Constanța 5–0 Dinamo București (15 July 2019); CFR Cluj 5–0 Voluntari (13 September 2019)
- Biggest away win: Hermannstadt 0–4 FCSB (26 October 2019); Voluntari 0–4 CFR Cluj (21 December 2019)
- Highest scoring: FCSB 4–3 Hermannstadt (14 July 2019); Chindia Târgoviște 2–5 Academica Clinceni (1 December 2019); Politehnica Iași 2–5 Universitatea Craiova (15 February 2020)
- Longest winning run: 8 matches Astra Giurgiu
- Longest unbeaten run: 9 matches Astra Giurgiu; FCSB
- Longest winless run: 16 matches Voluntari
- Longest losing run: 9 matches Politehnica Iași
- Highest attendance: 30,235; FCSB 1–1 Dinamo București (5 October 2019)
- Lowest attendance: 0^{1}
- Total attendance: 684,565
- Average attendance: 3,493
- All statistics correct as of 16 June 2020^{1}Impact of the COVID-19 pandemic on association football.

The 2019–20 Liga I (also known as Casa Liga 1 for sponsorship reasons) was the 102nd season of the Liga I, the top professional league for Romanian association football clubs, which began in July 2019 and was scheduled to end in June 2020. Suspended in March 2020 because of the COVID-19 pandemic in Romania, the season resumed on 13 June and effectively ended on 5 August. It was the fifth season to take place since the play-off/play-out rule had been introduced.

CFR Cluj were two-time defending champions, and they successfully defended their title once more. Universitatea Craiova competed for the trophy until the final fixture of the championship play-offs, and ultimately finished as runner-ups, while FCSB were unable to claim a top three spot in the table for the first time since the 2010–11 season. Because of the aforementioned situation created by the pandemic, it was decided that no club would be relegated directly. Instead, the 14th-placed team would take part in the promotion/relegation play-offs, which resulted in no club being relegated at all.

== Effects of the COVID-19 pandemic ==
The derby between FCSB and Universitatea Craiova on 8 March 2020 was played without spectators because of the COVID-19 pandemic. Four days later, all football leagues and competitions were suspended by the Romanian Football Federation until 31 March in regard to the COVID-19 pandemic in Romania. In May, it was announced that the Liga I would restart on the second weekend of June.

The first match meant to be played at the resumption was Universitatea Craiova versus FC Botoșani, on 12 June at 20:00 EEST (UTC+3), but was postponed after the latter club's doctor tested positive for the virus. This was the second game announced to be postponed on the same day after Dinamo București versus Chindia Târgoviște, which was scheduled for 13 June. Nevertheless, the season resumed with three other matches on 13 June.

After the restart, many matches were postponed due to COVID-19 cases that appeared inside the teams. At the end the season, two matches were cancelled in the play-off after Coronavirus cases from Astra Giurgiu and five matches were canceled in the play-out, after the emergence of the same issue at Dinamo București. The final league tables were approved without these matches and it was announced that only the last place, Chindia Târgoviște, would play a promotion/relegation play-off, with the rest of the teams being spared from relegation and the format being changed from 14 teams to 16 teams starting with the next season.

== Teams ==
The league consists of 14 teams: twelve teams from the 2018–19 Liga I and two new teams from the 2018–19 Liga II.

Teams promoted to the Liga I

The first club to be promoted was Academica Clinceni, following their 2–1 win against Argeș Pitești on 24 May 2019. Academica will play in the Liga I for the first time in their history.

The second club to be promoted was Chindia Târgoviște, following their 4–1 win against Luceafărul Oradea on 25 May 2019. AFC Chindia will play in the Liga I for the first time in their history, but the city of Târgoviște, returned in the Liga I after 21 years of absence, where it was last represented by FCM Târgoviște, named between 1996 and 2003 as CF Chindia, club that was also the first club of the city and which was replaced by the new club (AFC Chindia) after some internal conflicts.

Teams relegated to the Liga II

The first club to be relegated was Concordia Chiajna, which were relegated on 22 May 2019 following a 0–2 defeat against Dunărea Călărași, ending their 8-year stay in the top flight.

The second club to be relegated was Dunărea Călărași, which were relegated on 2 June 2019 following a 1–2 defeat against FC Hermannstadt, ending their 1-year stay in the top flight.

=== Venues ===
FCSB	Universitatea Craiova	CFR Cluj	Chindia Târgoviște
Arena Națională	Ion Oblemenco	Dr. Constantin Rădulescu	Ilie Oană (Note: Chindia Târgoviște was relocated to Ilie Oană Stadium in Ploiești, because Eugen Popescu Stadium in Târgoviște is under renovations.)
Capacity: 55,634	Capacity: 30,929	Capacity: 23,500	Capacity: 15,073
Dinamo București	2019–20 Liga I (Romania) Location of Bucharest teams.		Politehnica Iași
Stadionul Dinamo	2019–20 Liga I (Romania) Location of Bucharest teams.		Emil Alexandrescu
Capacity: 15,032	2019–20 Liga I (Romania) Location of Bucharest teams.		Capacity: 11,390
Astra Giurgiu	2019–20 Liga I (Romania) Location of Bucharest teams.		Gaz Metan Mediaș
Marin Anastasovici	2019–20 Liga I (Romania) Location of Bucharest teams.		Gaz Metan
Capacity: 8,500	2019–20 Liga I (Romania) Location of Bucharest teams.		Capacity: 7,814
FC Botoșani	2019–20 Liga I (Romania) Location of Bucharest teams.		Sepsi OSK
Municipal	2019–20 Liga I (Romania) Location of Bucharest teams.		Municipal
Capacity: 7,782	2019–20 Liga I (Romania) Location of Bucharest teams.		Capacity: 5,200
Hermannstadt	Voluntari	Viitorul Constanța	Academica Clinceni
Municipal (Note: FC Hermannstadt was relocated for several rounds to Trans-Sil Stadium in Târgu Mureș, because Municipal Stadium in Sibiu is under renovations.)	Anghel Iordănescu	Viitorul	Clinceni
Capacity: 5,000	Capacity: 4,600	Capacity: 4,554	Capacity: 4,500
Stadion-renovat-Sibiu			

=== Personnel and kits ===
Note: Flags indicate national team as has been defined under FIFA eligibility rules. Players and Managers may hold more than one non-FIFA nationality.

Team	Manager	Captain	Kit manufacturer	Shirt sponsor
Academica Clinceni	(Romania) Ilie Poenaru	(Romania) Răzvan Patriche	Joma	Nicmar Prima, Fermele Crevedia
Astra Giurgiu	(Romania) Bogdan Andone	(Romania) Denis Alibec	Joma	Tinmar, Pambac
Botoșani	(Romania) Marius Croitoru	(Romania) Andrei Patache	Erreà	Elsaco
CFR Cluj	(Romania) Dan Petrescu	(Portugal) Mário Camora	Joma	NTT Data
Chindia Târgoviște	(Romania) Emil Săndoi	(Romania) Cristian Cherchez	Joma	Primăria Târgoviște, CJ Dâmbovița
Dinamo București	(Romania) Gheorghe Mulțescu	(Croatia) Ante Puljić	Macron	Unibet
FCSB	(Romania) Anton Petrea	(Romania) Florin Tănase	Nike	City Insurance
Gaz Metan Mediaș	(Czech Republic) Dušan Uhrin Jr.	(Romania) Marius Constantin	Joma	Romgaz
Hermannstadt	(Spain) Rubén Albés	(Romania) Răzvan Dâlbea	Joma	Natur House
Politehnica Iași	(Romania) Mircea Rednic	(Romania) Cosmin Frăsinescu	Joma	Superbet
Sepsi OSK	(Romania) Leontin Grozavu	(Romania) István Fülöp	Adidas	Diószegi, Gyermelyi
Universitatea Craiova	(Italy) Cristiano Bergodi	(Romania) Nicușor Bancu	Joma	Betano
Viitorul Constanța	(Romania) Gheorghe Hagi	(Romania) Gabriel Iancu	Nike	Pepsi
Voluntari	(Romania) Mihai Teja	(Romania) Ionuț Balaur	Macron	Winner

=== Managerial changes ===
Team	Outgoing manager	Manner of departure	Date of vacancy	Position in table	Incoming manager	Date of appointment
FCSB	(Romania) Mihai Teja	Sacked	21 May 2019	Pre-season	(Romania) Bogdan Andone	5 June 2019
Sepsi	(Romania) Marin Barbu (caretaker)	End of tenure as a caretaker	31 May 2019	Pre-season	(Hungary) Csaba László	1 June 2019
Botoșani	(Romania) Liviu Ciobotariu	Signed by Lebanon	31 May 2019	Pre-season	(Romania) Marius Croitoru	10 July 2019
Politehnica	(Romania) Flavius Stoican	Signed by Petrolul Ploiești	31 May 2019	Pre-season	(Romania) Mihai Teja	10 June 2019
Dinamo	(Romania) Mircea Rednic	Mutual agreement	3 June 2019	Pre-season	(Romania) Eugen Neagoe	3 June 2019
Astra	(Romania) Costel Enache	Sacked	12 June 2019	Pre-season	(Romania) Dan Alexa	13 June 2019
Hermannstadt	(Hungary) Vasile Miriuță	Signed by Kisvárda	13 June 2019	Pre-season	(Romania) Costel Enache	17 June 2019
FCSB	(Romania) Bogdan Andone	Released	2 August 2019	8	(Romania) Vergil Andronache (caretaker)	2 August 2019
Academica	(Romania) Ilie Poenaru	No UEFA Pro Licence	8 August 2019	14	(Romania) Marin Dună	8 August 2019
Dinamo	(Romania) Eugen Neagoe	Mutual agreement	13 August 2019	13	(Czech Republic) Dušan Uhrin Jr.	13 August 2019
FCSB	(Romania) Vergil Andronache (caretaker)	Mutual agreement	23 August 2019	11	(Romania) Bogdan Vintilă	23 August 2019
Universitatea	(Romania) Corneliu Papură	Mutual agreement	2 September 2019	3	(Romania) Victor Pițurcă	2 September 2019
Hermannstadt	(Romania) Costel Enache	Mutual agreement	28 September 2019	12	(Romania) Eugen Neagoe	2 October 2019
Astra	(Romania) Dan Alexa	Sacked	9 October 2019	7	(Romania) Bogdan Andone	9 October 2019
Sepsi	(Hungary) Csaba László	Mutual agreement	12 November 2019	11	(Romania) Leontin Grozavu	12 November 2019
Politehnica	(Romania) Mihai Teja	Mutual agreement	23 December 2019	11	(Romania) Mircea Rednic	31 December 2019
Hermannstadt	(Romania) Eugen Neagoe	Mutual agreement	27 December 2019	10	(Hungary) Vasile Miriuță	27 December 2019
Voluntari	(Italy) Cristiano Bergodi	Sacked	1 January 2020	14	(Romania) Mihai Teja	8 January 2020
Universitatea	(Romania) Victor Pițurcă	Mutual agreement	14 January 2020	4	(Romania) Corneliu Papură	14 January 2020
Dinamo	(Czech Republic) Dušan Uhrin Jr.	Mutual agreement	11 March 2020	10	(Romania) Adrian Mihalcea	11 March 2020
Gaz Metan	(Romania) Edward Iordănescu	Mutual agreement	4 May 2020	6	(Czech Republic) Dušan Uhrin Jr.	15 June 2020
Universitatea	(Romania) Corneliu Papură	Mutual agreement	8 May 2020	3	(Italy) Cristiano Bergodi	9 May 2020
Hermannstadt	(Hungary) Vasile Miriuță	Sacked	14 June 2020	9	(Spain) Rubén Albés	19 June 2020
Chindia	(Romania) Viorel Moldovan	End of contract	30 June 2020	13	(Romania) Emil Săndoi	1 July 2020
Dinamo	(Romania) Adrian Mihalcea	Mutual agreement	13 July 2020	13	(Romania) Gheorghe Mulțescu	13 July 2020
FCSB	(Romania) Bogdan Vintilă	Sacked	19 July 2020	5	(Romania) Anton Petrea	19 July 2020
Viitorul	(Romania) Gheorghe Hagi	Mutual agreement	3 August 2020	7	(Romania) Cătălin Anghel	3 August 2020

== Regular season ==
In the regular season the 14 teams will meet twice, a total of 26 matches per team, with the top 6 advancing to the Championship round and the bottom 8 qualifying for Relegation round.

=== Table ===
Pos	Team	Pld	W	D	L	GF	GA	GD	Pts	Qualification
1	CFR Cluj	26	15	7	4	51	16	+35	52	Qualification for the Championship round
2	Universitatea Craiova	26	14	4	8	41	28	+13	46	Qualification for the Championship round
3	Botoșani	26	12	9	5	36	30	+6	45	Qualification for the Championship round
4	FCSB	26	13	5	8	37	29	+8	44	Qualification for the Championship round
5	Gaz Metan Mediaș	26	12	7	7	34	30	+4	43	Qualification for the Championship round
6	Astra Giurgiu (Note: Astra Giurgiu were deducted 3 points due to financial reasons.)	26	13	6	7	38	29	+9	42	Qualification for the Championship round
7	Viitorul Constanța	26	11	7	8	44	29	+15	40	Qualification for the Relegation round
8	Dinamo București	26	10	4	12	37	41	−4	34	Qualification for the Relegation round
9	Sepsi OSK	26	7	12	7	30	26	+4	33	Qualification for the Relegation round
10	Hermannstadt	26	5	10	11	26	44	−18	25	Qualification for the Relegation round
11	Chindia Târgoviște	26	6	7	13	29	47	−18	25	Qualification for the Relegation round
12	Politehnica Iași	26	5	7	14	26	40	−14	22	Qualification for the Relegation round
13	Academica Clinceni	26	4	10	12	30	47	−17	22	Qualification for the Relegation round
14	Voluntari	26	5	5	16	22	45	−23	20	Qualification for the Relegation round

Source: LPF (in Romanian), Soccerway
Rules for classification: 1) Points; 2) Head-to-head points; 3) Head-to-head goal difference; 4) Head-to-head goals scored; 5) Goal difference; 6) Goals scored; 7) Play-off.

=== Results ===
Home \ Away	ACA	AST	BOT	CFR	CHI	DIN	FCS	GAZ	HER	IAS	SPS	UCV	VII	VOL
Academica Clinceni		1–1	1–1	1–4	3–1	2–2	0–3	2–3	1–1	1–0	1–1	0–0	0–0	1–2
Astra Giurgiu	3–1		2–2	3–2	1–2	3–2	2–1	1–0	0–0	4–0	2–2	1–0	1–1	1–0
Botoșani	2–2	1–2		2–1	0–3	1–0	0–2	1–1	2–1	2–1	1–1	1–1	1–0	4–1
CFR Cluj	3–0	2–0	4–1		4–0	1–0	1–0	3–0	3–0	1–1	1–0	2–0	0–0	5–0
Chindia Târgoviște	2–5	1–0	0–1	1–4		3–2	1–2	1–1	1–1	2–1	0–0	1–1	0–1	1–2
Dinamo București	4–2	2–0	1–1	0–0	4–1		2–1	2–0	3–0	1–0	1–2	0–2	3–2	2–1
FCSB	0–0	1–3	0–2	0–0	1–1	1–1		2–0	4–3	1–2	2–1	2–0	2–1	1–3
Gaz Metan Mediaș	2–1	1–0	0–0	0–0	2–2	1–0	4–0		1–1	3–2	1–1	2–3	1–0	1–0
Hermannstadt	2–1	2–2	0–1	1–1	2–1	4–2	0–4	0–2		1–0	2–2	2–1	1–1	0–0
Politehnica Iași	2–0	1–0	0–3	2–1	2–2	2–0	1–2	1–2	0–0		1–1	2–5	1–2	2–2
Sepsi OSK	4–0	2–3	0–1	1–1	3–1	0–1	0–0	0–1	3–0	1–0		1–0	2–2	0–0
Universitatea Craiova	3–2	1–0	3–1	0–2	1–0	4–1	0–1	3–1	3–0	1–1	0–1		3–1	2–1
Viitorul Constanța	0–0	0–1	2–2	3–1	3–0	5–0	0–2	4–1	3–2	2–1	4–1	1–2		4–0
Voluntari	1–2	1–2	1–2	0–4	0–1	2–1	1–2	0–3	2–0	0–0	0–0	1–2	1–2	

Source: LPF (in Romanian)
Legend: Blue = home team win; Yellow = draw; Red = away team win.

=== Positions by round ===
Team ╲ Round	1	2	3	4	5	6	7	8	9	10	11	12	13	14	15	16	17	18	19	20	21	22	23	24	25	26
Academica Clinceni	13	13	13	14	11	13	13	12	12	13	13	13	13	13	13	12	12	11	11	13	12	13	13	13	13	13
Astra Giurgiu	6	9	7	6	8	8	8	7	7	6	7	7	6	5	4	3	4	3	2	2	4	3	4	4	5	6
Botoșani	4	3	3	4	4	5	6	6	6	8	6	6	5	9	7	7	7	7	8	7	7	7	6	5	4	3
CFR Cluj	9	4	4	2	1	1	1	2	1	1	1	1	1	1	1	1	1	1	1	1	1	1	1	1	1	1
Chindia Târgoviște	5	10	10	13	14	12	11	13	13	12	11	9	11	11	11	10	10	12	12	11	11	12	12	11	11	11
Dinamo București	14	14	14	11	13	14	9	9	9	10	10	11	9	8	9	9	9	8	7	8	8	9	8	9	8	8
FCSB	2	6	8	9	10	11	14	11	11	9	9	10	8	7	5	5	6	5	4	3	2	2	2	2	3	4
Gaz Metan Mediaș	7	5	6	7	5	4	3	1	3	4	4	4	4	4	6	6	5	6	6	6	6	5	7	7	6	5
Hermannstadt	12	12	12	10	12	9	10	10	10	11	12	12	12	12	12	13	13	13	13	12	13	10	10	10	10	10
Politehnica Iași	8	7	5	5	3	2	4	5	4	5	5	5	7	6	8	8	8	9	9	10	10	11	11	12	12	12
Sepsi OSK	10	8	9	8	7	7	7	8	8	7	8	8	10	10	10	11	11	10	10	9	9	8	9	8	9	9
Univ. Craiova	3	2	2	3	6	6	5	3	5	3	2	3	3	3	3	4	3	4	3	5	3	4	3	3	2	2
Viitorul Constanța	1	1	1	1	2	3	2	4	2	2	3	2	2	2	2	2	2	2	5	4	5	6	5	6	7	7
Voluntari	11	11	11	12	9	10	12	14	14	14	14	14	14	14	14	14	14	14	14	14	14	14	14	14	14	14

Source: FRF

== Championship play-offs ==
The top six teams from Regular season will meet twice (10 matches per team) for places in 2020–21 UEFA Champions League and 2020–21 UEFA Europa League as well as deciding the league champion. Teams start the Championship round with their points from the Regular season halved, rounded upwards, and no other records carried over from the Regular season.

=== Championship play-off table ===
Pos	Team	Pld	W	D	L	GF	GA	GD	Pts	Qualification
1	CFR Cluj (C)	10	7	2	1	17	7	+10	49	Qualification to Champions League first qualifying round
2	Universitatea Craiova	9	7	0	2	17	14	+3	44	Qualification to Europa League first qualifying round
3	Astra Giurgiu (Note: Astra Giurgiu failed to obtain a UEFA licence.)	8	3	3	2	12	8	+4	33	
4	Botoșani	10	2	3	5	10	12	−2	32	Qualification to Europa League first qualifying round
5	FCSB (Note: FCSB qualified for the Europa League first qualifying round by winning the 2019–20 Cupa României.)	9	2	3	4	13	14	−1	31	Qualification to Europa League first qualifying round
6	Gaz Metan Mediaș	10	0	3	7	5	19	−14	25	

Source: Soccerway, FRF (in Romanian), LPF (in Romanian)
Rules for classification: 1) Points; 2) Points without rounding; 3) Head-to-head points; 4) Head-to-head goal difference; 5) Head-to-head goals scored; 6) Goal difference; 7) Goals scored; 8) Play-off (only if needed to decide champion or teams for UEFA competitions). (Note: only criteria 6 and 7 are applied to establish the classification during the competition.)
(C) Champions

=== Championship play-off results ===
Home \ Away	AST	BOT	CFR	FCS	GAZ	UCV
Astra Giurgiu		1–0	2–2	3–2	0–0	
Botoșani	0–0		0–2	2–2	4–1	0–2
CFR Cluj	2–1	1–0		1–0	2–0	2–3
FCSB		1–1	0–2		2–2	4–1
Gaz Metan Mediaș	0–4	0–2	0–0	0–1		1–2
Universitatea Craiova	2–1	2–1	1–3	2–1	2–1	

Legend: Blue = home team win; Yellow = draw; Red = away team win.

=== Positions by round ===
Team ╲ Round	1	2	3	4	5	6	7	8	9	10
Astra Giurgiu	6	4	4	4	3	3	3	3	3	3
Botosani	3	5	5	6	5	5	4	5	5	4
CFR Cluj	1	1	1	1	1	2	2	2	1	1
FCSB	4	2	3	3	4	4	5	4	4	5
Gaz Metan Medias	5	6	6	5	6	6	6	6	6	6
Universitatea Craiova	2	3	2	2	2	1	1	1	2	2

Source: FRF

== Relegation play-outs ==
The bottom eight teams from regular season met twice (14 matches per team) to contest against relegation. Teams started the Relegation round with their points from the Regular season halved, rounded upwards, and no other records carried over from the Regular season. The winner of the Relegation round finished 7th in the overall season standings, the second placed team – 8th, and so on, with the last placed team in the Relegation round being 14th.

=== Relegation play-outs table ===
Pos	Team	Pld	W	D	L	GF	GA	GD	Pts	Qualification or relegation
7	Viitorul Constanța	14	6	5	3	25	17	+8	43	
8	Hermannstadt	12	6	4	2	18	14	+4	35	
9	Sepsi OSK	13	4	5	4	19	17	+2	34	
10	Academica Clinceni	14	7	0	7	14	21	−7	32	
11	Voluntari	14	6	3	5	16	12	+4	31	
12	Politehnica Iași	14	5	4	5	17	17	0	30	
13	Dinamo București	9	2	2	5	8	11	−3	25	
14	Chindia Târgoviște (O)	12	3	1	8	9	17	−8	23	Qualification for the relegation play-offs

Source: Soccerway, FRF (in Romanian), LPF (in Romanian)
Rules for classification: 1) Points; 2) Points without rounding; 3) Head-to-head points; 4) Head-to-head goal difference; 5) Head-to-head goals scored; 6) Goal difference; 7) Goals scored; 8) Play-off (only if needed to decide teams for relegation). (Note: only criteria 6 and 7 are applied to establish the classification during the competition.)
(O) Play-off winners

=== Relegation play-outs results ===
Home \ Away	ACA	CHI	DIN	HER	IAS	SPS	VII	VOL
Academica Clinceni		1–0	1–3	0–2	3–0	1–0	2–3	2–1
Chindia Târgoviște	3–1			0–1	0–2	1–1	2–1	2–0
Dinamo București	0–1				1–1	1–3	1–1	0–1
Hermannstadt	0–1	1–0			2–2	2–2	2–0	2–1
Politehnica Iași	0–1	1–0	1–0	2–3		3–1	1–1	2–1
Sepsi OSK	1–0	2–0		1–1	1–1		3–3	1–2
Viitorul Constanța	5–0	4–1	1–0	4–1	2–1	0–3		0–0
Voluntari	3–0	2–0	1–2	1–1	1–0	2–0	0–0	

Source: Liga 1
Legend: Blue = home team win; Yellow = draw; Red = away team win.

=== Positions by round ===
Team ╲ Round	1	2	3	4	5	6	7	8	9	10	11	12	13	14
Academica Clinceni	11	12	14	12	10	10	9	9	11	8	8	8	9	10
Chindia Târgoviște	12	13	13	11	12	13	13	14	14	14	14	14	14	14
Dinamo București	9	10	10	13	8	14	14	13	13	13	13	13	13	13
Hermannstadt	10	9	9	10	11	12	11	10	10	11	10	10	8	8
Politehnica Iași	13	11	12	14	13	11	12	12	12	12	12	12	12	12
Sepsi OSK	8	8	8	8	8	9	10	11	9	10	11	11	11	9
Viitorul Constanța	7	7	7	7	7	7	7	7	7	7	7	7	7	7
Voluntari	14	14	11	9	9	8	8	8	8	9	9	9	10	11

Source: FRF

== Promotion/relegation play-offs ==
The 14th-placed team of the Liga I faces the 3rd-placed team of the Liga II.

Team 1	Agg.	Team 2	1st leg	2nd leg
Chindia Târgoviște	3–1	Mioveni	2–0	1–1

9 August 2020	Chindia Târgoviște	2–0	Mioveni	Ploiești, Romania
18:00 EEST (UTC+3)	Bic 14'; Ivančić 41'			Stadium: Ilie Oană; Attendance: 0 Referee: István Kovács (Carei)

12 August 2020	Mioveni	1–1 (1–3 agg.)	Chindia Târgoviște	Mioveni, Romania
18:00 EEST (UTC+3)	Hergheligiu 7'		Ivančić 45+1'	Stadium: Orășenesc; Attendance: 0 Referee: Marius Avram (Bucharest)

== Season statistics ==
=== Top scorers ===
Updated to matches played on 16 June 2020.

Rank	Player	Club	Goals
1	(Romania) Gabriel Iancu	Viitorul Constanța	18
2	(Romania) Ciprian Deac	CFR Cluj	14
2	(Romania) Denis Alibec	Astra Giurgiu	14
2	(Romania) Alexandru Cicâldău	Universitatea Craiova	14
5	(Romania) Florinel Coman	FCSB	12
5	(Croatia) Gabriel Debeljuh	Hermannstadt	12
7	(Brazil) Rivaldinho	Viitorul Constanța	11
8	(Romania) Sergiu Buș	Gaz Metan Mediaș	10
8	(Romania) Deian Sorescu	Dinamo București	10
8	(Romania) Valentin Gheorghe	Astra Giurgiu	10

=== Hat-tricks ===
Player	For	Against	Result	Date
(Romania) Daniel Popa	Dinamo București	Academica Clinceni	4–2	2 August 2019
(Romania) George Merloi	Academica Clinceni	Chindia Târgoviște	5–2	1 December 2019

=== Clean sheets ===
Updated to matches played on 9 March 2020.

Rank	Player	Club	Clean sheets
1	(Lithuania) Giedrius Arlauskis	CFR Cluj	15
2	(Romania) Cristian Bălgrădean	FCSB	10
2	(Romania) Răzvan Pleșca	Gaz Metan Mediaș	10
4	(Romania) David Lazar	Astra Giurgiu	6
4	(Italy) Riccardo Piscitelli	Dinamo București	6
4	(Moldova) Denis Rusu	Politehnica Iași	6
4	(Romania) Roland Niczuly	Sepsi OSK	6
4	(Romania) Cătălin Căbuz	Viitorul Constanța	6
9	(Portugal) Cristiano	Hermannstadt	5
10	(Romania) Eduard Pap	Botoșani	4
10	(Romania) Mihai Aioani	Chindia Târgoviște	4
10	(Italy) Mirko Pigliacelli	Universitatea Craiova	4

=== Discipline ===
As of 9 March 2020

==== Player ====
- Most yellow cards: 9
  - (France) Bradley Diallo (Chindia Târgoviște)
  - (Romania) Bogdan Țîru (Viitorul Constanța)^{1}
  - (Romania) Valentin Mihăilă (Universitatea Craiova)
  - (Suriname) Nicandro Breeveld (Politehnica Iași)

^{1} Bogdan Țîru was transferred to Jagiellonia Białystok during the winter transfer window.

- Most red cards: 3
  - (Romania) Răzvan Tincu (Sepsi OSK)

==== Club ====
- Most yellow cards: 81
  - Politehnica Iași
- Most red cards: 6
  - FCSB
  - Voluntari

== Attendances ==
Pos	Team	Total	High	Low	Average	Change
1	Universitatea Craiova	182,813	30,000	4,200	13,058	−12.0%
2	FCSB	91,032	30,235	0	6,502	−7.0%^{3}
3	Dinamo București	64,538	27,500	600	4,610	+73.8%
4	CFR Cluj	57,000	10,000	1,500	4,071	−19.4%
5	Viitorul Constanța	41,652	4,500	900	2,975	+5.0%
6	Sepsi OSK	38,900	4,500	1,000	2,779	−4.7%
7	Politehnica Iași	38,250	7,000	200	2,732	+14.8%^{6}
8	Botoșani	37,580	5,000	500	2,684	+10.7%
9	Chindia Târgoviște	36,370	10,000	0	2,598	+0.5%^{1, 2}
10	Gaz Metan Mediaș	32,200	8,000	0	2,300	+13.0%
11	Hermannstadt	22,600	4,000	50	1,614	+19.2%^{4}
12	Academica Clinceni	15,468	3,500	100	1,105	+220.3%^{1,5}
13	Voluntari	13,875	2,011	0	991	−20.1%
14	Astra Giurgiu	12,287	2,500	150	878	−27.0%
	League total	684,565	30,235	0	3,493	+1.3%

Updated to games played on 9 March 2020
Source: League matches: Liga I 2019/2020
Notes:
1: Played last season in Liga II.
2: Chindia Târgoviște played 14 matches out of their stadium.
3: FCSB played 5 matches out of their stadium.
4: Hermannstadt played 8 matches out of their stadium.
5: Clinceni played 6 matches out of their stadium.
6: Politehnica Iași played 4 matches out of their stadium.

== Champion squad ==
CFR Cluj

Goalkeepers: Giedrius Arlauskis (Lithuania) (28 / 0); Jesús Fernández (Spain) (2 / 0); Otto Hindrich (1 / 0); Adrian Rus (1 / 0); Grzegorz Sandomierski (Poland) (1 / 0); Cosmin Vâtcă (4 / 0).
Defenders: Kévin Boli (Ivory Coast) (15 / 2); Andrei Burcă (21 / 2); Mihai Butean (4 / 0); Mário Camora (Portugal) (29 / 2); Mike Cestor (Democratic Republic of the Congo) (11 / 1); Denis Ciobotariu (1 / 0); Cristian Manea (5 / 0); Andrei Mureșan (7 / 0); Paulo Vinícius (Brazil) (25 / 5); Alex Pașcanu (4 / 0); Andrei Peteleu (13 / 0); Mateo Sušić (Bosnia and Herzegovina) (16 / 2).
Midfielders: Luís Aurélio (Portugal) (11 / 1); Mihai Bordeianu (21 / 2); Alexandru Chipciu (9 / 0); Valentin Costache (34 / 4); Emmanuel Culio (Argentina) (9 / 3); Ciprian Deac (25 / 14); Damjan Đoković (Croatia) (18 / 1); Alin Fică (2 / 0); Ovidiu Hoban (26 / 1); Cătălin Itu (33 / 4); Dodi Joca (5 / 0); Sebastian Mailat (1 / 0); Michaël Pereira (France) (16 / 2); Yacouba Sylla (Mali) (4 / 0); Adrian Păun (24 / 7); Claudiu Petrila (15 / 0).
Forwards: Cătălin Golofca (7 / 0); Billel Omrani (Algeria) (28 / 6); Lacina Traoré (Ivory Coast) (11 / 2); Mario Rondón (Venezuela) (24 / 2); George Țucudean (6 / 1).
(league appearances and goals listed in brackets)

Manager: Dan Petrescu.

== Awards ==
=== Liga I Team of the Season ===

Liga I Team of the 2019–20 Season – Liga Profesionistă de Fotbal

Player	Team	Position
(Lithuania) Giedrius Arlauskis	CFR Cluj	Goalkeeper
(Romania) Andrei Burcă	CFR Cluj	Defender
(Brazil) Paulo Vinícius	CFR Cluj	Defender
(Romania) Marius Constantin	Gaz Metan Mediaș	Defender
(Romania) Ciprian Deac	CFR Cluj	Midfielder
(Romania) Dan Nistor	Dinamo București / Universitatea Craiova	Midfielder
(Romania) Alexandru Cicâldău	Universitatea Craiova	Midfielder
(Argentina) Jonathan Rodríguez	Botoșani	Midfielder
(Romania) Gabriel Iancu	Viitorul	Forward
(Romania) Denis Alibec	Astra Giurgiu	Forward
(Romania) Florinel Coman	FCSB	Forward
