= Gabriel Șerban =

Romanian footballer

Personal information
- Full name: Gabriel Ștefan Șerban
- Date of birth: 11 February 2000 (age 26)
- Place of birth: Ploiești, Romania
- Height: 1.82 m (6 ft 0 in)
- Position: Midfielder

Team information
- Current team: Hermannstadt
- Number: 27

Youth career
- –2019: Astra Giurgiu

Senior career*
Years	Team	Apps	(Gls)
2019–2021	Astra II Giurgiu		
2019–2022	Astra Giurgiu	26	(1)
2022–	Hermannstadt	1	(0)
2022	→ Metaloglobus București (loan)	9	(0)
- * Club domestic league appearances and goals as of 29 October 2022

Gabriel Ștefan Șerban (born 11 February 2000) is a Romanian professional footballer who plays as a midfielder for Liga I club Hermannstadt.

== Honours ==
Astra Giurgiu

- Cupa României runner-up: 2020–21
