= Andrei Peteleu =

Romanian footballer

Personal information
- Full name: Ionuț Andrei Peteleu
- Date of birth: 20 August 1992 (age 34)
- Place of birth: Bistrița, Romania
- Height: 1.82 m (6 ft 0 in)
- Position: Right-back

Youth career
- –2009: Gloria Bistrița

Senior career*
Years	Team	Apps	(Gls)
2009–2013	Gloria Bistrița	38	(0)
2009–2011	→ Delta Tulcea (loan)	53	(4)
2013	FCM Târgu Mureș	9	(1)
2013–2014	Săgeata Năvodari	29	(0)
2014–2016	Petrolul Ploiești	41	(0)
2016–2020	CFR Cluj	50	(1)
2020–2021	Sheriff Tiraspol	8	(0)
2021	UTA Arad	11	(0)
2021–2023	Kisvárda	28	(0)
2023–2025	CFR Cluj	8	(0)
2023–2024	→ Universitatea Cluj (loan)	6	(0)
Total		281	(5)

International career
2009	Romania U17	3	(0)
2011	Romania U19	1	(0)
2012–2014	Romania U21	7	(0)
- * Club domestic league appearances and goals as of 15 July 2024

Ionuț Andrei Peteleu (born 20 August 1992) is a Romanian professional footballer who plays as a right-back.

== Honours ==
CFR Cluj

- Liga I: 2017–18, 2018–19, 2019–20
- Cupa României: 2024–25
- Supercupa României: 2018
