= Adrian Păun =

Romanian footballer (born 1995)

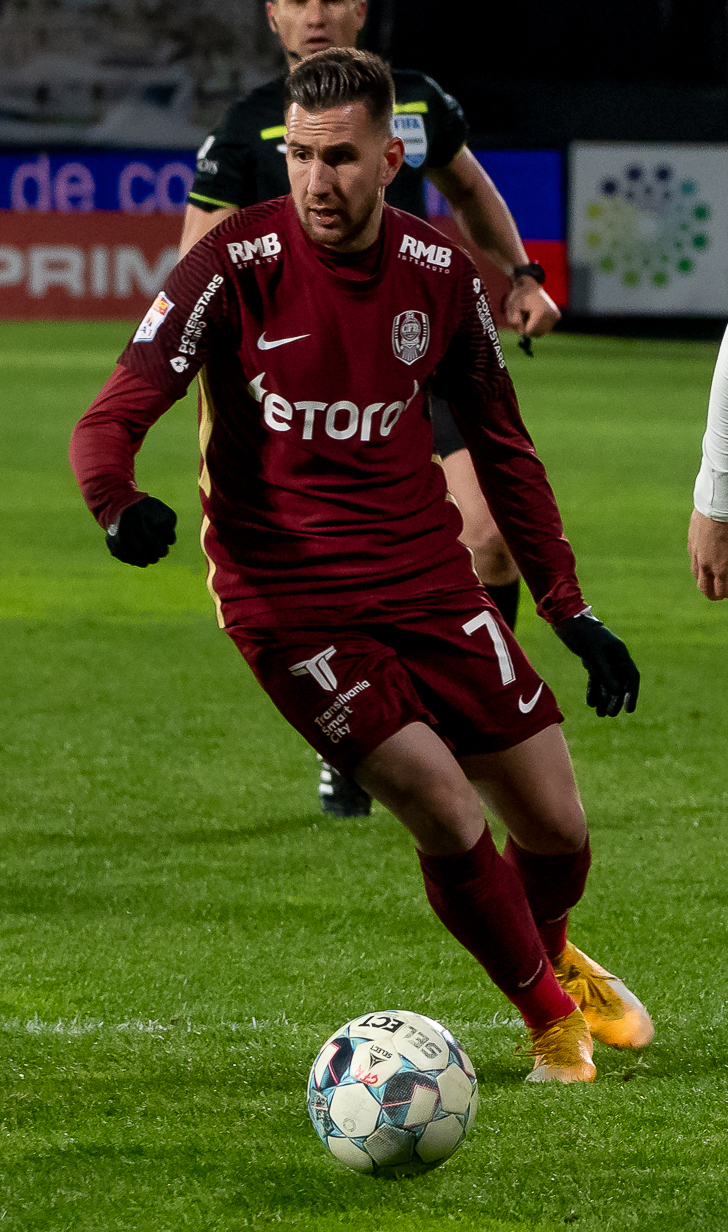
- Păun with CFR Cluj in 2022

Personal information
- Full name: Constantin Adrian Alexandru Păun
- Date of birth: 1 April 1995 (age 31)
- Place of birth: Drăgășani, Romania
- Height: 1.77 m (5 ft 10 in)
- Positions: Winger; attacking midfielder

Team information
- Current team: CFR Cluj
- Number: 10

Youth career
- 2005–2008: Triumf Drăgășani
- 2008–2014: CFR Cluj

Senior career*
Years	Team	Apps	(Gls)
2014–2023	CFR Cluj	235	(26)
2022–2023	→ Hapoel Be'er Sheva (loan)	24	(4)
2023–2024	Hapoel Be'er Sheva	2	(0)
2023–2024	→ Bnei Sakhnin (loan)	29	(3)
2024–	CFR Cluj	74	(7)

International career^{‡}
2011–2012	Romania U17	3	(0)
2013–2014	Romania U19	12	(1)
2014–2016	Romania U21	12	(3)
2021	Romania	1	(0)
- * Club domestic league appearances and goals as of 18 October 2026 ‡ National team caps and goals as of 6 June 2021

Constantin Adrian Alexandru Păun (Note: Some sources incorrectly give out his first name as being "Alexandru" and his surname as the single "Păun". His actual surname is the double "Alexandru Păun", in spite of the fact that children in Romania typically only take on their fathers' family names.) (Romanian pronunciation: [adriˈan konstanˈtin alekˈsandru ˈpə.un]; born 1 April 1995) is a Romanian professional footballer who plays as a winger or attacking midfielder for Liga I club CFR Cluj.

Păun spent most of his professional career at his boyhood club CFR Cluj, for which he made his debut in 2014 and appeared in over 230 league games. In 2022, he moved abroad for the first time by signing for Hapoel Be'er Sheva on an initial loan, and also played for Bnei Sakhnin, before returning to CFR Cluj two years later.

Internationally, Păun made his first—and only—appearance for Romania in June 2021, in a 0–1 friendly loss to England.

== Club career ==
Păun recorded his Liga I debut for CFR Cluj on 14 March 2014, in a 2–2 away draw with Corona Brașov. He scored his first goal for the team on 28 April 2015, in a 2–1 home victory over Concordia Chiajna.

On 28 September 2022, Păun joined Israeli club Hapoel Be'er Sheva on a season-long loan with an option to buy. On 15 November that year, it was announced that he signed for Be'er Sheva on a permanent deal until 2026.

On 20 September 2023, Hapoel Be'er Sheva sent Păun on a season-long loan to fellow Israeli Premier League side Bnei Sakhnin, with the player's salary being split between the two clubs.

== International career ==
Păun was called up to the Romania national team for the first time by coach Cosmin Contra on 30 August 2019, for the UEFA Euro 2020 qualification matches against Spain and Malta. He finally registered his debut on 6 June 2021 by starting in a 0–1 friendly loss to England.

== Career statistics ==
=== Club ===
As of match played 28 October 2026

Appearances and goals by club, season and competition
Club	Season	League			National cup (Note: Includes Cupa României, Israel State Cup)		Europe		Other		Total	
Club	Season	Division	Apps	Goals	Apps	Goals	Apps	Goals	Apps	Goals	Apps	Goals
CFR Cluj	2013–14	Liga I	4	0	1	0	—		—		5	0
CFR Cluj	2014–15	Liga I	20	1	3	0	1 (Note: Appearances in UEFA Europa League)	0	1 (Note: Appearances in Cupa Ligii)	1	25	2
CFR Cluj	2015–16	Liga I	32	3	4	1	—		1	0	37	4
CFR Cluj	2016–17	Liga I	29	4	2	0	—		1 (Note: Appearances in Supercupa României)	0	32	4
CFR Cluj	2017–18	Liga I	19	2	1	0	—		—		20	2
CFR Cluj	2018–19	Liga I	27	3	2	0	5 (Note: One appearance in UEFA Champions League, four appearances in UEFA Europa League)	0	1	0	35	3
CFR Cluj	2019–20	Liga I	24	7	0	0	14 (Note: Seven appearances in UEFA Champions League, seven appearances in UEFA Europa League)	0	0	0	38	7
CFR Cluj	2020–21	Liga I	39	5	1	0	8	0	1	0	49	5
CFR Cluj	2021–22	Liga I	36	1	0	0	13 (Note: Six appearances in UEFA Champions League, one appearance in UEFA Europa League, six appearances in UEFA Conference League)	0	1	0	50	1
CFR Cluj	2022–23	Liga I	5	0	—		10 (Note: Two appearances in UEFA Champions League, eight appearances in UEFA Conference League)	0	1	1	16	1
CFR Cluj	Total		235	26	14	1	51	0	7	2	307	29
Hapoel Be'er Sheva (loan)	2022–23	Israeli Premier League	24	4	1	0	—		1 (Note: Appearances in Toto Cup)	0	26	4
Hapoel Be'er Sheva	2023–24	Israeli Premier League	2	0	0	0	4 (Note: Appearances in UEFA Conference League)	0	0	0	6	0
Hapoel Be'er Sheva	Total		26	4	1	0	4	0	1	0	32	4
Bnei Sakhnin (loan)	2023–24	Israeli Premier League	29	3	1	1	—		0	0	30	4
CFR Cluj	2024–25	Liga I	35	4	3	0	3	0	—		41	4
CFR Cluj	2025–26	Liga I	31	3	3	1	3 (Note: Two appearances in UEFA Europa League, one appearance and one goal in UEFA Conference League)	1	1	0	38	5
CFR Cluj	2026–27	Liga I	8	0	2	1	4	0	—		14	1
CFR Cluj	Total		74	7	8	2	10	1	1	0	93	10
Career total			364	40	24	4	65	1	8	2	461	47

=== International ===
As of match played 6 June 2021

Appearances and goals by national team and year
National team	Year	Apps	Goals
Romania
Romania	2021	1	0
Total		1	0

== Honours ==
CFR Cluj

- Liga I: 2017–18, 2018–19, 2019–20, 2020–21, 2021–22
- Cupa României: 2015–16, 2024–25
- Supercupa României: 2018, 2020
