= 2022–23 Wisła Kraków season =

Wisła Kraków 2022–23 football season

Wisła Kraków
2022–23 season
- Chairman: Dawid Błaszczykowski (until 28 July 2022); Władysław Nowak (from 1 August 2022)
- Manager(s): Jerzy Brzęczek (until 3 October 2022); Radosław Sobolewski (from 3 October 2022)
- I liga: 4th
- Polish Cup: Round of 16
- Top goalscorer: League: Luis Fernández (20); All: Luis Fernández (20)
- Highest home attendance: 23,989 (vs. Puszcza Niepołomice, 6 June 2023, I liga)
- Lowest home attendance: 7,230 (vs. Puszcza Niepołomice, 19 October 2022, Polish Cup)
- Average home league attendance: 13,164

The 2022–23 Wisła Kraków season is the seventh season in the I liga and the 69th season in the Polish Cup.

== Transfers ==
=== Summer transfer window ===
==== Arrivals ====
- The following players moved to Wisła.

	Name	Position	Transfer type	Previous club	Fee	Ref.
	Transfer					
Substituted on	(Poland) Jakub Niewiadomski	Defender	10 June 2022	(Poland) Lech Poznań	Free	
Substituted on	(Albania) Vullnet Basha	Midfielder	10 June 2022	(Greece) Ionikos	Free	
Substituted on	(Poland) Bartosz Jaroch	Defender	14 June 2022	(Poland) Resovia Rzeszów	Free	
Substituted on	(Poland) Michał Żyro	Forward	14 June 2022	(Poland) Jagiellonia Białystok	Free	
Substituted on	(Poland) Igor Łasicki	Defender	15 June 2022	(Poland) Pogoń Szczecin	Free	
Substituted on	(France) Michaël Pereira	Midfielder	27 June 2022	(Turkey) Kocaelispor	Free	
Substituted on	(Croatia) Ivan Jelić Balta	Defender	1 July 2022	(Slovenia) FC Koper	Free	
Substituted on	(Poland) Dorian Frątczak	Goalkeeper	15 July 2022	(Poland) Garbarnia Kraków	Free	
Substituted on	(Poland) Jakub Złoch	Defender	29 July 2022	(Poland) Lech Poznań	Free	
Substituted on	(Poland) Bartosz Talar	Midfielder	12 August 2022	(France) Olympique Lyonnais B	Free	
Substituted on	(Spain) Ángel Rodado	Forward	20 August 2022	(Spain) UD Ibiza	Free	
Substituted on	(France) Boris Moltenis	Defender	31 August 2022	(France) US Boulogne	Free	
	Return from loan spell					
Substituted on	(Poland) Kamil Broda	Goalkeeper	1 June 2022	(Poland) Chojniczanka Chojnice	Free	
Substituted on	(Poland) Miłosz Jaskuła	Goalkeeper	1 June 2022	(Poland) Stal Brzeg	Free	
Substituted on	(Poland) Daniel Hoyo-Kowalski	Defender	1 June 2022	(Poland) Hutnik Kraków	Free	
Substituted on	(Poland) Krystian Wachowiak	Defender	1 June 2022	(Poland) GKS Tychy	Free	
Substituted on	(Bosnia and Herzegovina) Adi Mehremić	Defender	1 June 2022	(Israel) Maccabi Petah Tikva	Free	
Substituted on	(Poland) Paweł Koncewicz-Żyłka	Defender	1 June 2022	(Poland) Orlęta Radzyń Podlaski	Free	
Substituted on	(Poland) Wiktor Szywacz	Midfielder	1 June 2022	(Poland) Garbarnia Kraków	Free	
Substituted on	(Poland) Sławomir Chmiel	Midfielder	1 June 2022	(Poland) Hutnik Kraków	Free	
Substituted on	(Poland) Kacper Duda	Midfielder	1 June 2022	(Poland) Garbarnia Kraków	Free	
Substituted on	(Poland) Hubert Sobol	Forward	1 June 2022	(Poland) Stomil Olsztyn	Free	

==== Departures ====
- The following players moved from Wisła.

	Name	Position	Transfer type	New club	Fee	Ref.
	Transfer					
Substituted off	(Netherlands) Elvis Manu	Midfielder	8 June 2022	(Bulgaria) Botev Plovdiv	Free	
Substituted off	(Serbia) Marko Poletanović	Midfielder	9 June 2022	(Poland) Zagłębie Lubin	€90,000	
Substituted off	(Czech Republic) Jan Kliment	Forward	9 June 2022	(Czech Republic) FC Viktoria Plzeň	Free	
Substituted off	(Poland) Maciej Sadlok	Defender	10 June 2022	(Poland) Ruch Chorzów	Free	
Substituted off	(Czech Republic) Michal Frydrych	Defender	12 June 2022	(Czech Republic) FC Baník Ostrava	Free	
Substituted off	(Poland) Serafin Szota	Defender	14 June 2022	(Poland) Widzew Łódź	€40,000	
Substituted off	(Sweden) Sebastian Ring	Defender	14 June 2022	(France) Amiens SC	Free	
Substituted off	(Poland) Filip Jania	Defender	22 June 2022	(Poland) Bruk-Bet Termalica Nieciecza	Free	
Substituted off	(Austria) Stefan Savić	Midfielder	25 June 2022	(Turkey) Tuzlaspor	Free	
Substituted off	(Kazakhstan) Georgy Zhukov	Midfielder	25 June 2022	(China) Cangzhou Mighty Lions	Free	
Substituted off	(Poland) Paweł Kieszek	Goalkeeper	30 June 2022	(Portugal) UD Leiria	Free	
Substituted off	(Poland) Kacper Rosa	Goalkeeper	30 June 2022	(Poland) Stilon Gorzow Wielkopolski	Free	
Substituted off	(Slovakia) Michal Škvarka	Midfielder	12 July 2022	(Greece) Levadiakos	Free	
Substituted off	(Poland) Kamil Głogowski	Defender	19 July 2022	(Poland) Hutnik Kraków	Free	
Substituted off	(Poland) Ashley Akpan	Defender	19 July 2022	Released	Free	
Substituted off	(Poland) Jacek Gurgul	Midfielder	19 July 2022	(Poland) Miedź Legnica II	Free	
Substituted off	(Bosnia and Herzegovina) Adi Mehremić	Midfielder	23 August 2022	(Turkey) İstanbulspor	Free	
	On loan					
Substituted off	(Serbia) Nikola Kuveljić	Midfielder	12 July 2022	(Serbia) TSC Bačka Topola	Free	
Substituted off	(Poland) Paweł Koncewicz-Żyłka	Defender	14 July 2022	(Poland) Wieczysta Kraków	Free	
Substituted off	(North Macedonia) Enis Fazlagikj	Midfielder	18 August 2022	(Slovakia) DAC Dunajská Streda	Free	
Substituted off	(Poland) Daniel Hoyo-Kowalski	Defender	19 August 2022	(Poland) Wieczysta Kraków	Free	
Substituted off	(Poland) Dorian Gądek	Midfielder	19 August 2022	(Poland) Garbarnia Kraków	Free	
Substituted off	(Poland) Hubert Sobol	Forward	31 August 2022	(Poland) Górnik Łęczna	Free	
	End of loan					
Substituted off	(Czech Republic) Matěj Hanousek	Defender	7 June 2022	(Czech Republic) Sparta Prague	Free	
Substituted off	(Georgia (country)) Heorhiy Tsitaishvili	Midfielder	7 June 2022	(Ukraine) Dynamo Kyiv	Free	

=== Winter transfer window ===
==== Arrivals ====
- The following players moved to Wisła.

	Name	Position	Transfer type	Previous club	Fee	Ref.
	Transfer					
Substituted on	(Poland) Igor Sapała	Midfielder	9 December 2022	(Poland) Raków Częstochowa	Free	
Substituted on	(Spain) Álex Mula	Forward	15 December 2022	(Spain) CF Fuenlabrada	Free	
Substituted on	(Spain) David Juncà	Defender	29 December 2022	(Spain) Girona FC	Free	
Substituted on	(Spain) Tachi	Defender	20 January 2023	(Spain) Deportivo Alavés	Free	
Substituted on	(Spain) Sergio Benito	Forward	27 January 2023	(Spain) Córdoba CF	Free	
Substituted on	(Spain) Miki Villar	Forward	27 January 2023	(Spain) UD Ibiza	Free	
	On loan					
Substituted on	(Nigeria) James Igbekeme	Midfielder	22 February 2023	(Spain) Real Zaragoza	Free	

==== Departures ====
- The following players moved from Wisła.

	Name	Position	Transfer type	New club	Fee	Ref.
	Transfer					
Substituted off	(France) Michaël Pereira	Midfielder	6 January 2023	(Greece) Apollon Smyrnis	Free	
Substituted off	(Israel) Dor Hugi	Midfielder	17 January 2023	(Israel) Bnei Sakhnin	Free	
Substituted off	(Poland) Sławomir Chmiel	Midfielder	18 January 2023	(Poland) Hutnik Kraków	Free	
Substituted off	(Poland) Krystian Wachowiak	Defender	6 February 2023	(Poland) Stal Rzeszów	Free	
	On loan					
Substituted off	(Croatia) Ivan Jelić Balta	Defender	1 February 2023	(Bosnia and Herzegovina) FK Sarajevo	Free	

== Competitions ==
=== Preseason and friendlies ===
18 June 2022	Garbarnia Kraków	1−3	Wisła Kraków	Kraków, Poland
11:00 UTC+2	Feliks 86'	Report	Fernández 31'; Bartoń 51'; Szywacz 61'	Stadium: Stadion RKS Garbarnia; Attendance: 900; Referee: Seweryn Kozub (Brzesko)

25 June 2022	Wisła Kraków	2−0	Stal Mielec	Myślenice, Poland
11:30 UTC+2	Savić 53'; Bartoń 79'; Wachowiak (yellow card)	Report		Stadium: Sport Myślenice; Attendance: 500; Referee: Daniel Kruczyński (Żywiec)

2 July 2022	Wisła Kraków	3−0	GKS Jastrzębie	Kalwaria Zebrzydowska, Poland
11:30 UTC+2	Starzyński 52', 61'; Fazlagikj 85'	Report		Stadium: Stadion Miejski Kalwarianka; Attendance: 1,000; Referee: Witold Romanowski (Wadowice)

6 July 2022	Wisła Kraków	1−0	(Israel) Hapoel Be'er Sheva	Myślenice, Poland
17:00 UTC+2	Jaroch 15'; Jelić Balta (yellow card); Fernández (yellow card); Skrobański (yellow card)	Report		Stadium: Sport Myślenice; Referee: Sebastian Krasny (Kraków)

9 July 2022	Podbeskidzie Bielsko-Biała	3−2	Wisła Kraków	Bielsko-Biała, Poland
11:30 UTC+2	Drzazga 2'; Milašius 84'; Wełniak 87'	Report	Młyński 1'; Duda 45'	Stadium: Stadion Miejski; Referee: Tomasz Wajda (Żywiec)

31 July 2022	Wisła Kraków	1−1	ŁKS Łagów	Myślenice, Poland
11:30 UTC+2	Gądek 67'	Report	Kura 52'	Stadium: Sport Myślenice

23 September 2022	KS Raba Dobczyce	0−4	Wisła Kraków	Dobczyce, Poland
--:-- UTC+2	Ł. Ziemianin (yellow card); Dudek (yellow card)	Report	Fernández 68', 70'; Hugi 77'; Młyński 87'	Stadium: Stadion KS Raba Dobczyce; Attendance: 1,000; Referee: Mateusz Czerwień (Kraków)

18 November 2022	Stal Mielec	1−1	Wisła Kraków	Wola Chorzelowska, Poland
--:-- UTC+1	Lebedyński 33'; Matras (yellow card); Żyra (yellow card); Getinger (yellow card)	Report	Hugi 27'; Wachowiak (yellow card)	Stadium: Hotel Rado; Attendance: 80; Referee: Tomasz Mroczek (Mielec)

25 November 2022	Wisła Kraków	cancelled	Górnik Łęczna	Myślenice, Poland
14:30 UTC+1		Report		Stadium: Sport Myślenice

11 January 2023	Wisła Kraków	0−0	(Uzbekistan) Neftchi Fergana	Kumköy, Turkey
15:05 UTC+1		Report		Stadium: tssFC Football Center

14 January 2023	Wisła Kraków	cancelled	Ruch Chorzów	Myślenice, Poland
--:-- UTC+1		Report		Stadium: Sport Myślenice

14 January 2023	Wisła Kraków	5−1	Wisła Płock	Belek, Turkey
15:30 UTC+1	Mula 46', 87'; Fernández 52', 76'; Rodado 54'	Report	Warchoł 41'; Rasak (yellow card)	Stadium: Susesi Football Centre

18 January 2023	Wisła Kraków	1−0	(Ukraine) Shakhtar Donetsk U20	Kumköy, Turkey
15:00 UTC+1	Szywacz 57'; Rodado (yellow card); Szot (yellow card) (yellow-red card) 85'	Report		Stadium: tssFC Football Center; Referee: Leszek Lewandowski (Zabrze)

20 January 2023	Wisła Kraków	1−0	(Bulgaria) Hebar Pazardzhik	Kumköy, Turkey
13:00 UTC+1	Rodado 28'; Juncà (yellow card); Fernández (yellow card)	Report	Marcel (yellow card)	Stadium: tssFC Football Center; Referee: Karol Iwanowicz (Lublin)

24 January 2023	Wisła Kraków	1−1	(Kazakhstan) Atyrau	Kumköy, Turkey
14:00 UTC+1	Szot 13'; Szywacz (yellow card)	Report	Bissi 43'; Dzhumatov (penalty missed) 84'	Stadium: tssFC Football Center

27 January 2023	Wisła Kraków	1−3	(Austria) LASK	Kumköy, Turkey
--:-- UTC+1	Fernández 31' (pen.)	Report	Ljubičić 46'; Žulj 76' (pen.), 88'	Stadium: tssFC Football Center

3 February 2023	Wisła Kraków	cancelled	Wieczysta Kraków	Kraków, Poland
--:-- UTC+1				Stadium: Stadion im. Henryka Reymana

3 February 2023	Wisła Kraków	5−2	Siarka Tarnobrzeg	Kraków, Poland
18:00 UTC+1		Report		Stadium: Stadion im. Henryka Reymana; Attendance: behind closed doors
Note: The game was played in three thirds of 30+30+45 minutes

11 February 2023	Wisła Kraków	2−2	Garbarnia Kraków	Myślenice, Poland
12:00 UTC+1	Benito 61'; Grzybowski 67'; Tachi (yellow card)	Report	Assinor 28'; Warczak 64'	Stadium: Sport Myślenice; Referee: Patryk Świerczek (Brzesko)

25 February 2023	Wisła Kraków	1−1	Polonia Bytom	Myślenice, Poland
11:00 UTC+1	Igbekeme 42'; Starzyński (yellow card)	Report	Wolny 74'	Stadium: Sport Myślenice; Referee: Paweł Gądek (Tarnów)

24 March 2023	Wisła Kraków	1−3	Odra Opole	Kraków, Poland
12:00 UTC+1	Żemło 17' (o.g.)	Report	Jaroch 23' (o.g.); Czapliński 28'; Niziołek 40'; Żemło (yellow card)	Stadium: Stadion im. Henryka Reymana; Attendance: behind closed doors Referee: Bartosz Pałetko (Kraków)

=== I liga ===
==== League table ====
Pos	Team	Pld	W	D	L	GF	GA	GD	Pts	Promotion or Relegation
2	Ruch Chorzów (P)	34	17	11	6	48	33	+15	62	Promotion to Ekstraklasa
3	Bruk-Bet Termalica Nieciecza	34	16	13	5	55	37	+18	61	Qualification for Promotion play-offs
4	Wisła Kraków	34	18	6	10	61	38	+23	60	Qualification for Promotion play-offs
5	Puszcza Niepołomice (O, P)	34	16	10	8	49	36	+13	58	Qualification for Promotion play-offs
6	Stal Rzeszów	34	14	9	11	56	43	+13	51	Qualification for Promotion play-offs

Source: 1liga.org, 90minut.pl
Rules for classification: 1) Points; 2) Head-to-head points; 3) Head-to-head goal difference; 4) Goal difference; 6) Goals scored; 7) Number of wins; 8) Number of away wins. (Note: Head-to-head record is used only after all the matches between the teams in question have been played)
(O) Play-off winner; (P) Promoted

==== Results summary ====
Overall								Home						Away					
Pld	W	D	L	GF	GA	GD	Pts	W	D	L	GF	GA	GD	W	D	L	GF	GA	GD
34	18	6	10	61	38	+23	60	10	4	3	34	19	+15	8	2	7	27	19	+8

Last updated: 3 June 2023.
Source: 90minut

==== Results by round ====
Round	1	2	3	4	5	6	7	8	9	10	11	12	13	14	15	16	17	18	19	20	21	22	23	24	25	26	27	28	29	30	31	32	33	34
Ground	H	A	H	A	H	A	H	A	H	A	H	A	H	A	H	A	H	A	H	A	H	A	H	A	H	A	H	A	H	A	H	A	H	A
Result	D	W	W	W	W	L	W	L	L	L	D	L	D	D	D	W	L	D	W	W	W	W	W	W	W	L	W	L	W	L	W	W	L	W
Position	10	4	3	2	1	1	1	1	5	6	8	9	11	11	11	9	10	10	10	7	7	6	4	4	4	4	2	3	3	5	3	3	5	4

Updated to match(es) played on 3 June 2023. Source: 90minut
A = Away; H = Home; W = Win; D = Draw; L = Loss

==== Matches ====
16 July 2022 1	Wisła Kraków	0−0	Sandecja Nowy Sącz	Kraków
17:30 UTC+2	Duda (yellow card) 51'; Pereira (yellow card) 79'; Mehremić (yellow card) 90+5'	Report	Nekić (yellow card) 24'; Szufryn (yellow card) 37'; Wróbel (yellow card) 51'; Kosakiewicz (yellow card) 60'; Fall (yellow card) 69'	Stadium: Stadion im. Henryka Reymana; Attendance: 15,811; Referee: Tomasz Wajda (Żywiec)

22 July 2022 2	Resovia Rzeszów	0−2	Wisła Kraków	Rzeszów
20:30 UTC+2	Kwiecień (yellow card) 17'; Wasiluk (yellow card) 36'	Report	Żyro 18'; Łasicki 79'	Stadium: Stadion Miejski Stal; Attendance: 5,500; Referee: Jacek Małyszek (Lublin)

30 July 2022 3	Wisła Kraków	1−0	Arka Gdynia	Kraków
17:30 UTC+2	Jelić Balta (yellow card) 25'; Basha (yellow card) 40'; Żyro 60' (pen.); Wachowiak (yellow card) 71'; Szywacz (yellow card) 90+1'; Jaroch (yellow card) 90+4'; Sobol (yellow card) 90+6'	Report	Alemán (red card) 25'; Marcjanik (yellow card) 45+2' (yellow-red card) 58'; Stolc (yellow card) 62'; Rymaniak (yellow card) 79'; Milewski (yellow card) 83'; Dobrotka (yellow card) 90+3'	Stadium: Stadion im. Henryka Reymana; Attendance: 15,176; Referee: Jarosław Przybył (Kluczbork)

5 August 2022 4	Odra Opole	0−1	Wisła Kraków	Opole
20:30 UTC+2	Czapliński (yellow card) 43'	Report	Jelić Balta (yellow card) 16'; Kędziora 47' (o.g.); Żyro (yellow card) 90+4'	Stadium: Stadion Odry Opole; Attendance: 2,916; Referee: Paweł Pskit (Zgierz)

9 August 2022 5	Wisła Kraków	2−1	GKS Katowice	Kraków
20:30 UTC+2	Duda (yellow card) 40'; Jaroch (yellow card) 51'; Fernández 71', 75'; Jelić Balta (yellow card) 85'; Łasicki (yellow card) 88'	Report	Błąd 3'; Dudziński (yellow card) 27'; Jędrych (yellow card) 39'; Kołodziejski (yellow card) 53'	Stadium: Stadion im. Henryka Reymana; Attendance: 14,241; Referee: Damian Kos (Wejherowo)

13 August 2022 6	GKS Tychy	3−1	Wisła Kraków	Tychy
17:30 UTC+2	Wołkowicz (yellow card) 35'; Żyro 44' (o.g.); Rumin 58'; Czyżycki 70', (yellow card) 72'; Radecki (yellow card) 90+1'; Mańka (yellow card) 90+3'	Report	Jelić Balta (yellow card) 28'; Fernández 36' (pen.), (yellow card) 66'	Stadium: Stadion Miejski; Attendance: 5,785; Referee: Łukasz Szczech (Kobyłka)

20 August 2022 7	Wisła Kraków	3−0	Skra Częstochowa	Kraków
17:30 UTC+2	Fernández 37' (pen.); Młyński 46'; Duda (yellow card) 58'; Gruszkowski 90+4'	Report	Niedbała (yellow card) 75'	Stadium: Stadion im. Henryka Reymana; Attendance: 14,009; Referee: Wojciech Myć (Lublin)

26 August 2022 8	Chrobry Głogów	2−1	Wisła Kraków	Głogów
20:30 UTC+2	Tupaj (yellow card) 17'; Machaj 65' (pen.), 90+2' (pen.); Górski (yellow card) 84'	Report	Rodado 6'; Fernández (red card) 19'; Biegański (yellow card) 79'; Colley (yellow card) 90'	Stadium: Stadion Chrobrego Głogów; Attendance: 2,450; Referee: Dominik Sulikowski (Gdańsk)

2 September 2022 9	Wisła Kraków	2−3	Puszcza Niepołomice	Kraków
20:30 UTC+2	Rodado 2'; Łasicki (yellow card) 29'; Duda (yellow card) 77'; Basha 85'; Jaroch (yellow card) 90+4'	Report	Koj (yellow card) 2'; Sołowiej 22' (pen.); Thiakane 25'; Wróblewski (yellow card) 31'; Mroziński 45+1'; Serafin (yellow card) 46'; Hajda (yellow card) 90+4'	Stadium: Stadion im. Henryka Reymana; Attendance: 17,012; Referee: Paweł Malec (Łódź)

10 September 2022 10	Stal Rzeszów	2−1	Wisła Kraków	Rzeszów
17:30 UTC+2	Michalik 22', 56'; Poczobut (yellow card) 69'	Report	Żyro 16'; Młyński (yellow card) 61'; Szot (yellow card) 90+7'	Stadium: Stadion Miejski Stal; Attendance: 7,478; Referee: Daniel Stefański (Bydgoszcz)

16 September 2022 11	Wisła Kraków	1−1	Ruch Chorzów	Kraków
20:30 UTC+2	Fernández 27' (pen.); Jaroch (yellow card) 42'; Jelić Balta (yellow card) 78'	Report	Swędrowski (yellow card) 2'; Janoszka (penalty missed) 43'; Michalski (yellow card) 45+3'; Szczepan 59'	Stadium: Stadion im. Henryka Reymana; Attendance: 22,117; Referee: Szymon Marciniak (Płock)

30 September 2022 12	Chojniczanka Chojnice	1−0	Wisła Kraków	Chojnice
20:30 UTC+2	Bartosiak (yellow card) 15' (yellow-red card) 82'; Mikołajczak 50' (pen.), (yellow card) 66'; Grolik (yellow card) 69'	Report	Moltenis (yellow card) 12'; Niewiadomski (yellow card) 21'; Hugi (yellow card) 25'; Jelić Balta (yellow card) 33'	Stadium: Stadion Miejski Chojniczanka 1930; Attendance: 2,751; Referee: Patryk Gryckiewicz (Toruń)

7 October 2022 13	Wisła Kraków	2−2	ŁKS Łódź	Kraków
20:30 UTC+2	Łasicki (yellow card) 17'; Jaroch 30'; Fernández 38' (pen.); Młyński (yellow card) 76'; Colley (yellow card) 77'	Report	Monsalve (yellow card) 53', (goal) 56'; Pirulo 77'	Stadium: Stadion im. Henryka Reymana; Attendance: 13,414; Referee: Paweł Raczkowski (Warsaw)

15 October 2022 14	Bruk-Bet Termalica Nieciecza	0−0	Wisła Kraków	Nieciecza
17:30 UTC+2	Biedrzycki (yellow card) 37'; Putivtsev (yellow card) 64'	Report	Moltenis (yellow card) 26'; Młyński (yellow card) 54'; Cissé (yellow card) 90+3'	Stadium: Stadion Sportowy Bruk-Bet Termalica; Attendance: 4,666; Referee: Tomasz Kwiatkowski (Warsaw)

22 October 2022 15	Wisła Kraków	3−3	Podbeskidzie Bielsko-Biała	Kraków
17:30 UTC+2	Moltenis (red card) 40'; Fernández 50' (pen.), 63'; Łasicki (yellow card) 54'; Jaroch 81'; Żyro (yellow card) 89'	Report	Milašius (yellow card) 7'; Biliński 13'; Markov (yellow card) 49'; Román 70', (yellow card) 90+4'; Drzazga 90+1'	Stadium: Stadion im. Henryka Reymana; Attendance: 11,711; Referee: Karol Arys (Szczecin)

28 October 2022 16	Zagłębie Sosnowiec	1−2	Wisła Kraków	Sosnowiec
20:30 UTC+1	Pawłowski 13'; Bykov (yellow card) 37'; Bryła (yellow card) 75'	Report	Fernández 39', 53'; Szot (yellow card) 84'	Stadium: Stadion Ludowy; Attendance: 4,950; Referee: Patryk Gryckiewicz (Toruń)

4 November 2022 17	Wisła Kraków	1−2	Górnik Łęczna	Kraków
20:30 UTC+1	Łasicki (yellow card) 11'; Szot 44', (yellow card) 45+2'; Basha (yellow card) 48'; Duda (yellow card) 81'	Report	Grzeszczyk (yellow card) 13', (goal) 16'; Krykun 61'; Gąska (yellow card) 79'; Zbozień (yellow card) 81'	Stadium: Stadion im. Henryka Reymana; Attendance: 14,111; Referee: Jarosław Przybył (Kluczbork)

13 November 2022 18	Sandecja Nowy Sącz	1−1	Wisła Kraków	Niepołomice
12:40 UTC+1	Boczek (yellow card) 34'; Słaby (yellow card) 59', (goal) 86'; Kosakiewicz (yellow card) 82'	Report	Łasicki 17'; Colley (yellow card) 52'; Fernández (yellow card) 65'; Duda (yellow card) 75'	Stadium: Stadion Miejski; Attendance: 653; Referee: Leszek Lewandowski (Zabrze)

10 February 2023 19	Wisła Kraków	2−0	Resovia Rzeszów	Kraków
20:30 UTC+1	Seweryn 16' (o.g.); Fernández 36', (yellow card) 46'; Sobolewski (yellow card) 55'	Report	Sylvestr (yellow card) 54'	Stadium: Stadion im. Henryka Reymana; Attendance: 9,311; Referee: Marcin Kochanek (Opole)

18 February 2023 20	Arka Gdynia	1−3	Wisła Kraków	Gdynia
17:30 UTC+1	Capanni (yellow card) 7'; Gojny 39'; Skóra (yellow card) 45'; Żebrowski (yellow card) 82'; Stolc (yellow card) 90+2'	Report	Duda (yellow card) 9'; Villar (yellow card) 28'; Juncà (yellow card) 37'; Moltenis 55', 60'; Młyński 64'; Tachi (yellow card) 79'	Stadium: Stadion Miejski; Attendance: 6,473; Referee: Szymon Marciniak (Płock)

24 February 2023 21	Wisła Kraków	2−1	Odra Opole	Kraków
20:30 UTC+1	Młyński (yellow card) 27'; Sapała (yellow card) 33'; Fernández (penalty missed) 40', 68', 86'; Juncà (yellow card) 42'; Jaroch (yellow card) 61'	Report	Galán 37'	Stadium: Stadion im. Henryka Reymana; Attendance: 9,447; Referee: Leszek Lewandowski (Zabrze)

4 March 2023 22	GKS Katowice	1−3	Wisła Kraków	Katowice
17:30 UTC+1	Jędrych (yellow card) 50'; Arak 69'	Report	Fernández 49', 54' (pen.); Rodado 64'; Basha (yellow card) 90+3'	Stadium: Stadion GKS Katowice; Attendance: 3,649; Referee: Jarosław Przybył (Kluczbork)

11 March 2023 23	Wisła Kraków	2−1	GKS Tychy	Kraków
17:30 UTC+1	Jaroch 53'; Fernández 90+6' (pen.)	Report	Radecki (yellow card) 58' (yellow-red card) 84'; Wołkowicz 66' (pen.); Nedić (yellow card) 69'	Stadium: Stadion im. Henryka Reymana; Attendance: 9,401; Referee: Marcin Kochanek (Opole)

17 March 2023 24	Skra Częstochowa	0−3	Wisła Kraków	Bełchatów
20:30 UTC+1		Report	Mula 28'; Machała 53' (o.g.); Villar 62'	Stadium: GIEKSA Arena; Attendance: 1,800; Referee: Patryk Gryckiewicz (Toruń)

1 April 2023 25	Wisła Kraków	4−1	Chrobry Głogów	Kraków
17:30 UTC+2	Villar 16'; Fernández 22', 45'; Rodado 77'	Report	Kolenc (yellow card) 4'; Górski (yellow card) 8'; Mucha (yellow card) 34'; Wolsztyński 39'; Bogusz (yellow card) 64'; Steblecki (yellow card) 75'	Stadium: Stadion im. Henryka Reymana; Attendance: 9,439; Referee: Karol Arys (Szczecin)

8 April 2023 26	Puszcza Niepołomice	2−1	Wisła Kraków	Niepołomice
17:30 UTC+2	Koj 24'; Serafn (yellow card) 45+1'; Kidrič 45+10' (pen.); Stępień (yellow card) 90+5'; Komar (yellow card) 90+6'; Hajda (yellow card) 90+6'	Report	Moltenis 51'; Żyro (yellow card) 90+5'; Juncà (yellow card) 90+6'	Stadium: Stadion Miejski; Attendance: 2,000; Referee: Piotr Lasyk (Bytom)

14 April 2023 27	Wisła Kraków	3−1	Stal Rzeszów	Kraków
20:30 UTC+2	Fernández 32' (pen.); Juncà 34'; Rodado 45+2'	Report	Danielewicz (yellow card) 47' (yellow-red card) 75'; Kłos (yellow card) 51'; Poczobut 69' (pen.); Piątek (yellow card) 81'	Stadium: Stadion im. Henryka Reymana; Attendance: 9,451; Referee: Marcin Szczerbowicz (Olsztyn)

22 April 2023 28	Ruch Chorzów	2−0	Wisła Kraków	Gliwice
17:30 UTC+2	Feliks 31'; Wójtowicz (yellow card) 44'; Moneta 69'; Sikora (yellow card) 72'	Report	Villar (yellow card) 44'; Łasicki (yellow card) 63'; Benito (yellow card) 83'	Stadium: Stadion im. Piotra Wieczorka; Attendance: 9,913; Referee: Bartosz Frankowski (Toruń)

29 April 2023 29	Wisła Kraków	3−0	Chojniczanka Chojnice	Kraków
17:30 UTC+2	Tachi 40'; Villar 51'; Igbekeme 75'; Łasicki (yellow card) 82'	Report	Grolik (yellow card) 62'	Stadium: Stadion im. Henryka Reymana; Attendance: 9,427; Referee: Grzegorz Kawałko (Olsztyn)

5 May 2023 30	ŁKS Łódź	3−2	Wisła Kraków	Łódź
20:30 UTC+2	Janczukowicz 11'; Pirulo 41' (pen.); Trąbka (yellow card) 42'; Dankowski (yellow card) 48'; Szeliga 53'; Monsalve (yellow card) 61'	Report	Rodado 26', (yellow card) 29'; Fernández 36'; Jaroch (yellow card) 47'; Łasicki (yellow card) 67'; Igbekeme (yellow card) 81'; Basha (yellow card) 90'	Stadium: Stadion Miejski im. Władysława Króla; Attendance: 14,845; Referee: Daniel Stefański (Bydgoszcz)

12 May 2023 31	Wisła Kraków	2−1	Bruk-Bet Termalica Nieciecza	Kraków
20:30 UTC+2	Villar 10'; Colley (yellow card) 15'; Fernández (yellow card) 30'; Tachi (yellow card) 52'; Jaroch 60'; Moltenis (yellow card) 84'; Gruszkowski (yellow card) 90'; Biegański (yellow card) 90+3'	Report	Karasek 22', (yellow card) 45+3' (yellow-red card) 70'; Ambrosiewicz (yellow card) 54'; Hilbrycht (yellow card) 57'; Biedrzycki (yellow card) 69'; Tekijaški (yellow card) 90+4'	Stadium: Stadion im. Henryka Reymana; Attendance: 9,411; Referee: Paweł Raczkowski (Warsaw)

20 May 2023 32	Podbeskidzie Bielsko-Biała	0−3	Wisła Kraków	Bielsko-Biała
17:30 UTC+2	Wypych (yellow card) 42'; Misztal (yellow card) 45'	Report	Tachi (yellow card) 13'; Jaroch (yellow card) 42'; Szot 45+4'; Rodado 53', 70'	Stadium: Stadion Miejski; Attendance: 13,800; Referee: Jarosław Przybył (Kluczbork)

28 May 2023 33	Wisła Kraków	1−2	Zagłębie Sosnowiec	Kraków
12:40 UTC+2	Moltenis 2', (yellow card) 90+1'; Łasicki (yellow card) 67'; Basha (yellow card) 86'	Report	Fábry 55'; Dalić (yellow card) 65'; Wrzesiński 79', (yellow card) 89'	Stadium: Stadion im. Henryka Reymana; Attendance: 9,469; Referee: Łukasz Kuźma (Białystok)

3 June 2023 34	Górnik Łęczna	0−3	Wisła Kraków	Łęczna
17:30 UTC+2	Pierzak (yellow card) 58'; De Amo (yellow card) 88'	Report	Żyro 14'; Szot 30'; Sapała (yellow card) 45'; Duda (yellow card) 68'; Młyński 86'	Stadium: Stadion Górnika Łęczna; Attendance: 3,395; Referee: Tomasz Kwiatkowski (Warsaw)

Promotion play-offs

6 June 2023 Semi-final	Wisła Kraków	1−4	Puszcza Niepołomice	Kraków
18:00 UTC+2	Duda (yellow card) 45+4'; Mula 84'; Łasicki (yellow card) 90+5'	Report	Thiakane (yellow card) 5'; Serafin (yellow card) 10'; Zapolnik 33'; Sołowiej 45+3'; Komar (yellow card) 51'; Klisiewicz 90+1', 90+4'	Stadium: Stadion im. Henryka Reymana; Attendance: 23,989; Referee: Piotr Lasyk (Bytom)

=== Polish Cup ===
30 August 2022 Round 1	Legia Warsaw II	0−5	Wisła Kraków	Książenice
16:15 UTC+2	Tadrowski (yellow card) 26' (red card) 60'; Pacek (yellow card) 33'; Laskowski (yellow card) 38'	Report	Duda 19'; Plewka 54'; Rodado (yellow card) 55', (goal) 61' (pen.), 90'; Szywacz 65'	Stadium: Legia Training Center; Referee: Paweł Pskit (Zgierz)

19 October 2022 Round 2	Wisła Kraków	2−2 (a.e.t.) (6−5 p)	Puszcza Niepołomice	Kraków
19:15 UTC+2	Cissé 30'; Wachowiak (yellow card) 78'; Łasicki (yellow card) 99'; Rodado 102'; Jelić Balta (yellow card) 120'	Report	Tomalski (yellow card) 35', (goal) 37'; Serafin (yellow card) 79' (yellow-red card) 105'; Čikoš (yellow card) 106'; Bartosz (yellow card) 109'; Sołowiej (yellow card) 113'; Wojcinowicz (red card) 119'; Kramarz 120'	Stadium: Stadion im. Henryka Reymana; Attendance: 7,230; Referee: Sebastian Jarzębak (Bytom)
	Penalties
	Fernández (penalty scored); Rodado (penalty missed); Jaroch (penalty scored); Moltenis (penalty scored); Colley (penalty scored); Wachowiak (penalty scored); Duda (penalty scored)		(penalty scored) Pięczek; (penalty missed) Sołowiej; (penalty scored) Bartosz; (penalty scored) Mroziński; (penalty scored) Thiakane; (penalty scored) Boguski; (penalty missed) Frelek

9 November 2022 Round of 16	Motor Lublin	1−0	Wisła Kraków	Lublin
14:30 UTC+1	Król 86'; Kahsay (yellow card) 88'	Report	Jaroch (yellow card) 27'; Hugi (yellow card) 88'	Stadium: Lublin Arena; Attendance: 7,561; Referee: Marcin Kochanek (Opole)

== Squad and statistics ==
=== Appearances, goals and discipline ===
As of match played 6 June 2023

No.	Pos.	Nat	Name	Total		I liga		Polish Cup		Discipline	
No.	Pos.	Nat	Name	Apps	Goals	Apps	Goals	Apps	Goals	Yellow card	Red card
1	GK	(Poland) POL	Kamil Broda	6	0	4	0	2	0	0	0
3	DF	(Spain) ESP	Tachi	14	1	11+3	1	0	0	2	0
4	DF	(France) FRA	Boris Moltenis	25	4	22+1	4	2	0	4	1
5	DF	(Sweden) SWE	Joseph Colley	17	0	15+1	0	0+1	0	4	0
6	DF	(Poland) POL	Alan Uryga	0	0	0	0	0	0	0	0
7	MF	(Poland) POL	Igor Sapała	7	0	3+4	0	0	0	2	0
8	MF	(Nigeria) NGR	James Igbekeme	14	1	10+4	1	0	0	1	0
9	FW	(Spain) ESP	Ángel Rodado	31	11	28	8	0+3	3	2	0
10	FW	(Spain) ESP	Luis Fernández	33	20	29+2	20	0+2	0	4	1
11	MF	(Poland) POL	Mateusz Młyński	28	3	14+13	3	1	0	4	0
13	FW	(Czech Republic) CZE	Zdeněk Ondrášek	1	0	0+1	0	0	0	0	0
14	FW	(Poland) POL	Michał Żyro	29	4	12+15	4	2	0	3	0
15	FW	(Poland) POL	Marcin Bartoń	1	0	0+1	0	0	0	0	0
16	MF	(Poland) POL	Jakub Błaszczykowski	2	0	0+2	0	0	0	0	0
17	DF	(Poland) POL	Jakub Niewiadomski	4	0	2+1	0	1	0	1	0
18	MF	(Poland) POL	Bartosz Talar	15	0	4+9	0	2	0	0	0
19	FW	(Spain) ESP	Miki Villar	17	4	17	4	0	0	2	0
20	DF	(Poland) POL	Konrad Gruszkowski	17	1	4+11	1	2	0	1	0
24	FW	(Spain) ESP	Sergio Benito	10	0	1+9	0	0	0	1	0
25	DF	(Poland) POL	Bartosz Jaroch	35	4	31+2	4	1+1	0	7	0
26	DF	(Poland) POL	Igor Łasicki	35	2	32	2	3	0	11	0
28	DF	(Spain) ESP	David Juncà	13	1	13	1	0	0	3	0
31	GK	(Poland) POL	Mikołaj Biegański	32	0	31	0	1	0	2	0
33	GK	(Poland) POL	Dorian Frątczak	0	0	0	0	0	0	0	0
37	FW	(Spain) ESP	Álex Mula	12	2	8+4	2	0	0	0	0
41	MF	(Poland) POL	Kacper Duda	37	1	22+12	0	2+1	1	9	0
43	DF	(Poland) POL	Dawid Szot	15	3	6+7	3	1+1	0	3	0
52	DF	(Poland) POL	Jakub Krzyżanowski	0	0	0	0	0	0	0	0
53	MF	(Poland) POL	Wiktor Szywacz	15	1	0+13	0	1+1	1	1	0
54	MF	(Poland) POL	Piotr Starzyński	14	0	2+10	0	1+1	0	0	0
66	MF	(Albania) ALB	Vullnet Basha	23	1	11+10	1	2	0	5	0
70	MF	(Guinea) GUI	Momo Cissé	15	1	6+8	0	1	1	1	0
75	DF	(Poland) POL	Kacper Skrobański	5	0	1+2	0	2	0	0	0
80	MF	(Poland) POL	Patryk Plewka	15	1	8+4	0	3	1	0	0
Players transferred or loaned out during the season
2	DF	(Poland) POL	Krystian Wachowiak	17	0	12+3	0	1+1	0	2	0
4	DF	(Bosnia and Herzegovina) BIH	Adi Mehremić	6	0	5+1	0	0	0	1	0
7	MF	(France) FRA	Michaël Pereira	6	0	2+3	0	1	0	1	0
8	DF	(Croatia) CRO	Ivan Jelić Balta	19	0	13+3	0	1+2	0	7	0
19	FW	(Poland) POL	Hubert Sobol	1	0	0+1	0	0	0	1	0
22	MF	(North Macedonia) MKD	Enis Fazlagikj	2	0	1+1	0	0	0	0	0
73	MF	(Poland) POL	Sławomir Chmiel	0	0	0	0	0	0	0	0
77	MF	(Israel) ISR	Dor Hugi	9	0	5+3	0	0+1	0	2	0

=== Goalscorers ===
As of match played 7 June 2023

Rank	Pos.	Nat	No.	Player	I liga	Polish Cup	Total
1	FW	(Spain)	10	Luis Fernández	20	0	20
2	FW	(Spain)	9	Ángel Rodado	8	3	11
3	DF	(Poland)	4	Boris Moltenis	4	0	4
3	FW	(Poland)	14	Michał Żyro	4	0	4
3	FW	(Spain)	19	Miki Villar	4	0	4
3	DF	(Poland)	25	Bartosz Jaroch	4	0	4
7	FW	(Poland)	11	Mateusz Młyński	3	0	3
7	DF	(Poland)	43	Dawid Szot	3	0	3
9	DF	(Poland)	26	Igor Łasicki	2	0	2
9	FW	(Spain)	37	Álex Mula	2	0	2
11	DF	(Spain)	3	Tachi	1	0	1
11	MF	(Nigeria)	8	James Igbekeme	1	0	1
11	DF	(Poland)	20	Konrad Gruszkowski	1	0	1
11	DF	(Spain)	28	David Juncà	1	0	1
11	MF	(Poland)	41	Kacper Duda	0	1	1
11	MF	(Poland)	53	Wiktor Szywacz	0	1	1
11	MF	(Albania)	66	Vullnet Basha	1	0	1
11	MF	(Guinea)	70	Momo Cissé	0	1	1
11	MF	(Poland)	80	Patryk Plewka	0	1	1
				Own goal	3	0	3
TOTALS					62	7	69

=== Disciplinary record ===
No.	Pos.	Nat	Name	I liga			Polish Cup			Total			Notes
No.	Pos.	Nat	Name	Yellow card	Second yellow card	Red card	Yellow card	Second yellow card	Red card	Yellow card	Second yellow card	Red card	Notes
2	DF	(Poland)	Krystian Wachowiak	1			1			2			
3	DF	(Spain)	Tachi	3						3			
4	DF	(France)	Boris Moltenis	4		1				4		1	
4	DF	(Bosnia and Herzegovina)	Adi Mehremić	1						1			
5	DF	(Sweden)	Joseph Colley	4						4			
7	MF	(Poland)	Igor Sapała	2						2			
7	MF	(France)	Michaël Pereira	1						1			
8	MF	(Nigeria)	James Igbekeme	1						1			
8	DF	(Croatia)	Ivan Jelić Balta	6			1			7			
9	FW	(Spain)	Ángel Rodado	1			1			2			
10	FW	(Spain)	Luis Fernández	4		1				4		1	
11	MF	(Poland)	Mateusz Młyński	4						4			
14	FW	(Poland)	Michał Żyro	3						3			
17	DF	(Poland)	Jakub Niewiadomski	1						1			
19	FW	(Spain)	Miki Villar	2						2			
19	FW	(Poland)	Hubert Sobol	1						1			
20	DF	(Poland)	Konrad Gruszkowski	1						1			
24	FW	(Spain)	Sergio Benito	1						1			
25	DF	(Poland)	Bartosz Jaroch	7			1			8			
26	DF	(Poland)	Igor Łasicki	10			1			11			
28	DF	(Spain)	David Juncà	3						3			
31	GK	(Poland)	Mikołaj Biegański	2						2			
41	MF	(Poland)	Kacper Duda	9						9			
43	DF	(Poland)	Dawid Szot	3						3			
53	MF	(Poland)	Wiktor Szywacz	1						1			
66	MF	(Albania)	Vullnet Basha	5						5			
70	MF	(Guinea)	Momo Cissé	1						1			
77	MF	(Israel)	Dor Hugi	1			1			2			

Last updated: 6 June 2023
Source: Competitive matches
Only competitive matches
(yellow card) = Number of bookings; (second yellow card) = Number of sending offs after a second yellow card; (red card) = Number of sending offs by a direct red card.
