= Miki Villar =

Spanish footballer (born 1996)

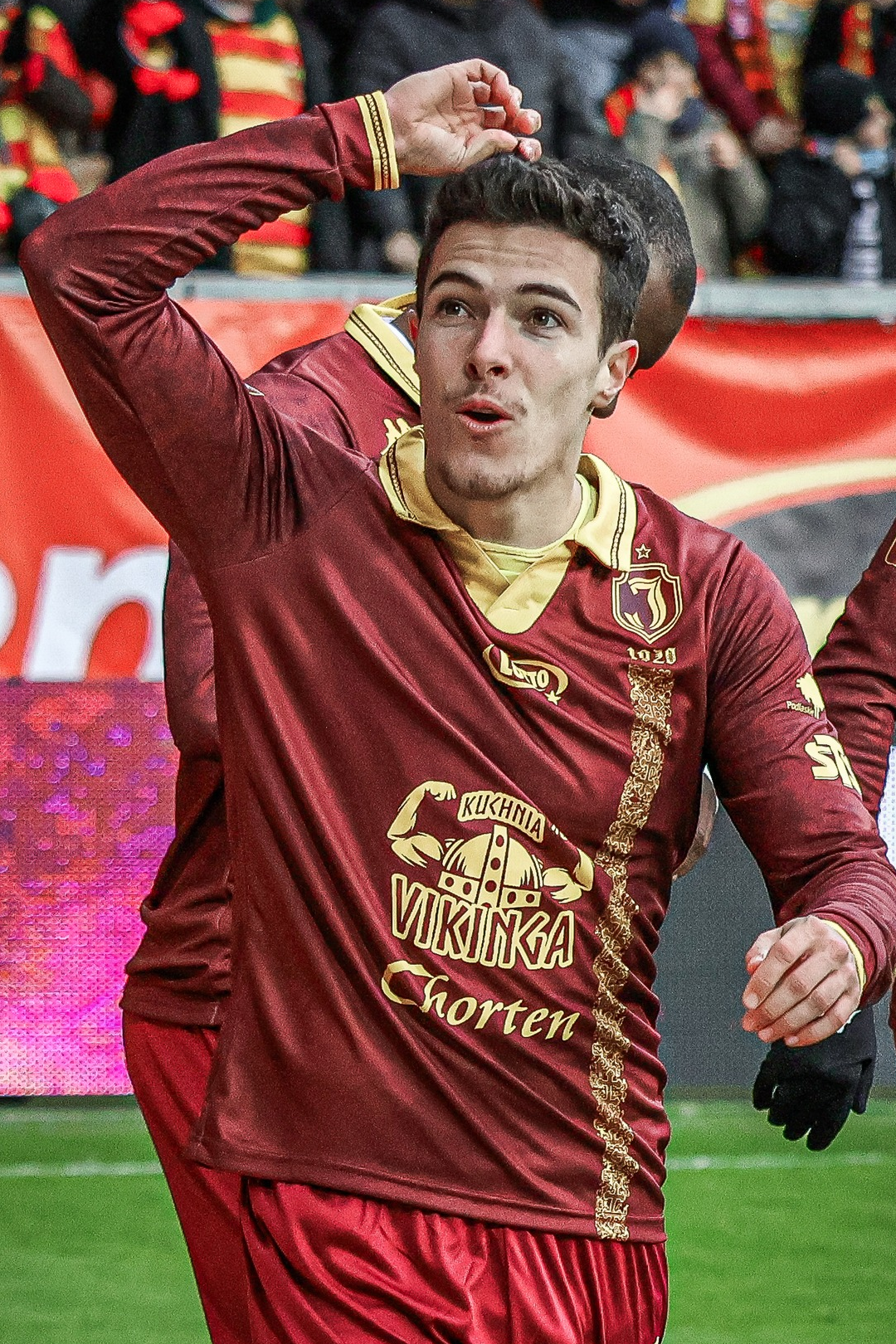
- Villar in 2025 with Jagiellonia Białystok

Personal information
- Full name: Miguel Villar Alonso
- Date of birth: 19 September 1996 (age 30)
- Place of birth: Nigrán, Spain
- Height: 1.73 m (5 ft 8 in)
- Position: Winger

Team information
- Current team: Wieczysta Kraków
- Number: 23

Youth career
- Celta
- Rápido Bouzas

Senior career*
Years	Team	Apps	(Gls)
2013–2015	Rápido Bouzas	48	(7)
2015–2017	Pontevedra	12	(0)
2016	→ Rápido Bouzas (loan)	5	(0)
2017–2018	Boiro	31	(3)
2018–2021	Compostela	82	(12)
2021–2023	Ibiza	47	(2)
2023–2024	Wisła Kraków	46	(9)
2024–2025	Jagiellonia Białystok	30	(2)
2025–	Wieczysta Kraków	32	(3)
- * Club domestic league appearances and goals as of 21:22, 16 August 2026 (UTC)

Miguel Villar Alonso (born 19 September 1996), known as Miki Villar or just Miki, is a Spanish professional footballer who plays as a right winger for Polish club Wieczysta Kraków.

== Club career ==
Born in Nigrán, Pontevedra, Galicia, Miki represented RC Celta de Vigo and Rápido de Bouzas as a youth. He made his senior debut with the latter's first team on 24 November 2013, playing the last 27 minutes of a 1–2 Tercera División home loss against UD Somozas.

Miki scored his first senior goal on 15 December 2013, netting his team's third in a 3–1 away win over Racing Club Villalbés. He became a regular starter in the 2014–15 season, playing in 37 matches and scoring six times.

On 21 July 2015, Miki signed for Segunda División B side Pontevedra CF. The following 1 February, after being rarely used, he extended his contract for a further year and returned to his former side Rápido on loan.

On 24 July 2017, Miki joined CD Boiro in the fourth division, and immediately became a first-choice. On 5 July of the following year, he agreed to a deal with fellow league team SD Compostela, and helped the side in their promotion back to division three 2020.

On 16 June 2021, Miki signed a two-year deal with Segunda División newcomers UD Ibiza. He made his professional debut on 13 August, coming on as a late substitute for Mateusz Bogusz in a 0–0 away draw against Real Zaragoza.

Miki scored his first goal for Ibiza on 7 November 2021, netting the winner in a 1–0 away success over Real Sociedad B. On 23 January 2023, he terminated his contract with the club.

Shortly after, on 27 January, Villar signed with Polish club Wisła Kraków until June 2024, joining his compatriots Ángel Rodado, Sergio Benito, Tachi, David Juncà, Luis Fernández and Álex Mula.

He aided Wisła in winning the 2023–24 Polish Cup, making five appearances in the competition, including coming on a second-half substitute in a 2–1 victory over Pogoń Szczecin in the final on 2 May 2024. He left the club at the end of his contract on 30 June 2024.

On 2 July 2024, Villar joined defending Ekstraklasa champions Jagiellonia Białystok on a two-year deal, with an option for a further year.

On 8 September 2025, Villar returned to Kraków to join second-tier Wieczysta Kraków on a two-year contract, with an option for a third year.

== Career statistics ==
As of match played 31 May 2026

Appearances and goals by club, season and competition
Club	Season	League			National cup (Note: Includes Copa del Rey, Polish Cup)		Europe		Other		Total	
Club	Season	Division	Apps	Goals	Apps	Goals	Apps	Goals	Apps	Goals	Apps	Goals
UD Ibiza	2021–22	Segunda División	32	1	2	1	—		—		34	2
UD Ibiza	2022–23	Segunda División	15	1	2	0	—		—		17	1
UD Ibiza	Total		47	2	4	1	—		—		51	3
Wisła Kraków	2022–23	I liga	16	4	—		—		1 (Note: Appearance(s) in I liga promotion play-offs)	0	17	4
Wisła Kraków	2023–24	I liga	29	5	5	0	—		—		34	5
Wisła Kraków	Total		45	9	5	0	—		1	0	51	9
Jagiellonia Białystok	2024–25	Ekstraklasa	29	2	2	0	17 (Note: Four appearances in UEFA Champions League, two appearances in UEFA Europa League, eleven appearances in UEFA Conference League)	0	1 (Note: Appearance in Polish Super Cup)	1	49	3
Jagiellonia Białystok	2025–26	Ekstraklasa	1	0	—		4 (Note: Appearances in UEFA Conference League)	0	—		5	0
Jagiellonia Białystok	Total		30	2	2	0	21	0	1	0	54	3
Wieczysta Kraków	2025–26	I liga	27	2	—		—		2	0	29	2
Career total			149	15	11	1	21	0	4	1	185	17

== Honours ==
Wisła Kraków

- Polish Cup: 2023–24

Jagiellonia Białystok

- Polish Super Cup: 2024
