= Sergio Benito =

Spanish footballer

Personal information
- Full name: Sergio Benito Crujera
- Date of birth: 23 March 1999 (age 27)
- Place of birth: Madrid, Spain
- Height: 1.73 m (5 ft 8 in)
- Position: Forward

Team information
- Current team: Ourense
- Number: 9

Youth career
- 2005–2011: Rayo Vallecano
- 2011–2014: Real Madrid
- 2014–2017: Rayo Vallecano

Senior career*
Years	Team	Apps	(Gls)
2017–2020	Rayo Vallecano B	25	(8)
2018–2019	→ Barakaldo (loan)	28	(7)
2019–2020	→ Cultural Leonesa (loan)	21	(4)
2020–2022	Valladolid B	38	(12)
2020–2022	Valladolid	1	(0)
2021–2022	→ Badajoz (loan)	15	(1)
2022–2023	Córdoba CF	9	(1)
2023	Wisła Kraków	10	(0)
2023–2024	Fuenlabrada	36	(7)
2024–2025	Real Unión	36	(8)
2025–2026	Ponferradina	12	(3)
2026–	Ourense	14	(3)
- * Club domestic league appearances and goals as of 10 June 2026

Sergio Benito Crujera (born 23 March 1999) is a Spanish professional footballer who plays as a forward for Primera Federación club Ourense.

== Club career ==
Born in Madrid, Benito began his career with Rayo Vallecano in 2005, aged six. In 2011, he joined Real Madrid's La Fábrica, but returned to Rayo in 2014.

Benito made his senior debut with the reserves on 27 August 2017, playing the last 16 minutes of a 1–2 Tercera División away loss against CF Trival Valderas. He scored his first senior goal six days later, netting his team's second in a 2–0 home win against RSD Alcalá.

On 18 August 2018, Benito was loaned to Segunda División B side Barakaldo CF for the season. On 9 August of the following year, he moved to fellow league team Cultural y Deportiva Leonesa also in a temporary deal.

Whilst at Cultural, Benito scored an extra time winner in a 2–1 Copa del Rey success over Atlético Madrid, but also saw his decisive penalty in the play-off final being saved by CE Sabadell FC's goalkeeper Ian Mackay, which led to a 6–7 loss in the shoot-out. He returned to Rayo in July 2020, but signed a three-year contract with Real Valladolid on 5 October, being assigned to the B-team also in division three.

Benito made his first team debut on 15 December 2020, starting in a 5–0 away win against CD Cantolagua, for the season's Copa del Rey. His professional – and La Liga – debut occurred the following 19 January, as he came on as a late substitute for Óscar Plano in a 2–2 home draw against Elche CF.

On 25 August 2021, Benito moved to Primera División RFEF side CD Badajoz on loan for the 2021–22 season.

On 27 January 2023, Benito left Spain for the first time in his career to join Polish second division club Wisła Kraków until June 2024, joining his compatriots Ángel Rodado, Miki Villar, Tachi, David Juncà, Luis Fernández and Álex Mula. He made 10 league appearances before terminating his contract on 15 June.

On 4 July 2024, Benito signed for Real Unión.
