= 2021–22 UD Ibiza season =

UD Ibiza
2021–22 season
- Owner: Salvo Family
- President: Amadeo Salvo
- Head coach: Juan Carlos Carcedo (until 18 December); Paco Jémez (from 26 December)
- Stadium: Can Misses
- Segunda División: 15th
- Copa del Rey: Second round
- Top goalscorer: League: Cristian Herrera (11); All: Cristian Herrera (11)
Third colours

The 2021–22 season was the seventh season in the existence of UD Ibiza and the club's first ever season in the second division of Spanish football. In addition to the domestic league, Ibiza participated in this season's edition of the Copa del Rey.

== Players ==
=== First-team squad ===
As of 31 January 2022

Note: Flags indicate national team as defined under FIFA eligibility rules; some limited exceptions apply. Players may hold more than one non-FIFA nationality.

No.	Pos.	Nation	Player
1	GK	ESP	Germán Parreño
2	DF	ESP	Fran Grima (captain)
3	DF	ESP	David Morillas
4	DF	ESP	David Goldar
5	DF	ESP	Rubén González
6	DF	ESP	Álex Gálvez
7	FW	ESP	Davo
8	MF	ESP	Manu Molina
9	MF	ESP	Nono
10	FW	ESP	Ekain Zenitagoia
11	FW	ESP	Miguel Ángel Guerrero
12	DF	ESP	Juan Ibiza
13	GK	ESP	Álex Domínguez (on loan from Las Palmas)

No.	Pos.	Nation	Player
14	MF	ESP	Javi Pérez
15	MF	ESP	Javi Lara
16	MF	ESP	Raúl Sánchez
17	FW	ESP	Sergio Castel
18	MF	SEN	Pape Diop
19	MF	ESP	Álvaro Jiménez (on loan from Cádiz)
20	MF	FRA	Kevin Appin
21	FW	ESP	Cristian Herrera
22	FW	ESP	Miki Villar
23	DF	ESP	Cifu
24	DF	ARG	Gonzalo Escobar
26	GK	ESP	Jorge Chanza
—	FW	POL	Mateusz Bogusz (on loan from Leeds United)

=== Out on loan ===
Note: Flags indicate national team as defined under FIFA eligibility rules; some limited exceptions apply. Players may hold more than one non-FIFA nationality.

No.	Pos.	Nation	Player
—	DF	ESP	Javi Vázquez (at Racing Santander until 30 June 2022)
—	FW	ESP	Ángel Rodado (at Barcelona B until 30 June 2022)

== Pre-season and friendlies ==
Win Draw Loss

16 July 2021 Friendly	Getafe	1–0	Ibiza	Cartagena, Spain
10:00 CEST (UTC+2)	Timor 74'	Report		Stadium: La Manga Club Football Center
Note: The match was played in two halves 35 minutes each.

21 July 2021 Friendly	Ibiza	2–0	Al-Raed	Orihuela, Spain
19:00 CEST (UTC+2)				Stadium: Estadio Municipal Los Arcos

24 July 2021 Friendly	Ibiza	1–2	Mallorca	La Nucia, Spain
20:00 CEST (UTC+2)	Rodado 27'		Mboula 53'; Junior 61'	Stadium: Estadi Olímpic Camilo Cano

3 August 2021 Friendly	Ibiza	2–0	Peña Deportiva	Ibiza, Spain
17:00 CEST (UTC+2)				Stadium: Can Misses

6 August 2021 Friendly	Alcorcón	2–1	Ibiza	Alcorcón, Spain
18:45 CEST (UTC+2)				Stadium: Santo Domingo

13 January 2022 Friendly	Ibiza	1–1	Peña Deportiva	La Nucia, Spain
16:30 CET (UTC+1)				Stadium: Estadi Olímpic Camilo Cano

== Competitions ==
=== Overall record ===
Competition	First match	Last match	Starting round	Final position	Record							
Competition	First match	Last match	Starting round	Final position	Pld	W	D	L	GF	GA	GD	Win %
Segunda División	13 August 2021	29 May 2022	Matchday 1	15th	42	12	16	14	53	59	−6	28.57
Copa del Rey	1 December 2021	15 December 2021	First round	Second round	2	1	0	1	3	2	+1	50.00
Total					44	13	16	15	56	61	−5	29.55

Source: Soccerway

=== Segunda División ===
==== League table ====
Pos	Team	Pld	W	D	L	GF	GA	GD	Pts
13	Huesca	42	13	15	14	49	44	+5	54 (Note: Leganés finished ahead of Huesca on head-to-head points: Leganés 2–1 Huesca, Huesca 0–2 Leganés.)
14	Mirandés	42	15	7	20	58	62	−4	52 (Note: Mirandés finished ahead of Ibiza on head-to-head points: Mirandés 4–0 Ibiza, Ibiza 0–2 Mirandés.)
15	Ibiza	42	12	16	14	53	59	−6	52
16	Lugo	42	10	20	12	46	52	−6	50
17	Sporting Gijón	42	11	13	18	43	48	−5	46

Source: LaLiga SmartBank
Rules for classification: 1) points; 2) head-to-head points; 3) head-to-head goal difference; 4) goal difference; 5) number of goals scored

==== Results summary ====
Overall								Home						Away					
Pld	W	D	L	GF	GA	GD	Pts	W	D	L	GF	GA	GD	W	D	L	GF	GA	GD
42	12	16	14	53	59	−6	52	6	10	5	30	25	+5	6	6	9	23	34	−11

Source: La Liga SmartBank

==== Results by round ====
Round	1	2	3	4	5	6	7	8	9	10	11	12	13	14	15	16	17	18	19	20	21	22	23	24	25	26	27	28	29	30	31	32	33	34	35	36	37	38	39	40	41	42
Ground	A	H	A	H	A	H	H	A	A	H	A	H	A	H	A	H	A	H	A	H	H	A	H	A	H	A	H	A	H	A	H	A	H	A	H	A	H	A	H	A	H	A
Result	D	D	W	D	D	D	W	L	L	L	D	W	W	D	W	L	D	L	D	D	L	W	W	W	D	L	W	L	W	D	D	L	D	L	W	L	D	W	D	L	L	L
Position	15	13	6	8	8	9	4	8	15	16	16	15	9	10	7	9	11	12	14	14	16	13	10	9	10	10	10	11	7	8	8	10	12	13	10	13	13	10	10	10	14	15

Source: La Liga SmartBank
A = Away; H = Home; W = Win; D = Draw; L = Loss

==== Matches ====
The league fixtures were announced on 30 June 2021.

13 August 2021 1	Zaragoza	0–0	Ibiza	Zaragoza
22:00 CEST (UTC+2)		Report		Stadium: La Romareda; Referee: Iosu Galech Apezteguía

22 August 2021 2	Ibiza	2–2	Málaga	Ibiza
17:00 CEST (UTC+2)	Bogusz 19', 61'	Report	Muñoz 63'; Fernández 87'	Stadium: Can Misses; Attendance: 2,487; Referee: Óliver de la Fuente Ramos

28 August 2021 3	Leganés	1–2	Ibiza	Leganés
19:30 CEST (UTC+2)	Arnaiz 59'	Report	Castel 57'; Zenitagoia 80'	Stadium: Butarque; Attendance: 4,454; Referee: Alejandro Quintero González

5 September 2021 4	Ibiza	1–1	Amorebieta	Ibiza
16:00 CEST (UTC+2)	Castel 53'	Report	Obieta 3'	Stadium: Can Misses; Referee: Raúl Martín González Francés

11 September 2021 5	Las Palmas	1–1	Ibiza	Las Palmas
17:15 WEST (UTC+1)	Moleiro 68'	Report	Castel 12'	Stadium: Estadio Gran Canaria; Attendance: 11,726; Referee: Víctor García Verdura

18 September 2021 6	Ibiza	1–1	Oviedo	Ibiza
16:00 CEST (UTC+2)				Stadium: Can Misses

25 September 2021 7	Ibiza	2–0	Burgos	Ibiza
16:00 CEST (UTC+2)				Stadium: Can Misses

14 November 2021 16	Ibiza	0–1	Almería	Ibiza
16:00 CET	Javi Lara (yellow card) 45'; Manu Molina (yellow card) 57'	Report	Dyego Sousa (yellow card) 21' (goal) 45+1' (pen.); Babić (yellow card) 55'; Curro Sánchez (yellow card) 61'	Stadium: Estadi Municipal de Can Misses; Attendance: 4,937; Referee: Eduardo Prieto Iglesias

4 February 2022 26	Almería	2–0	Ibiza	Almería
21:00 CET	Portillo (yellow card) 23'; Ramazani (yellow card) 38' (goal) 58' (pen.); Arnau Puigmal (yellow card) 46'; Sadiq 90+2'	Report	Diop (yellow card) 33'; Cristian (yellow card) 38'; Cifu (yellow card) 38'; Álex Gálvez (yellow card) 72' (yellow-red card) 73'	Stadium: Estadio de los Juegos Mediterráneos; Attendance: 7,993; Referee: Álvaro Moreno Aragón
