= 2026–27 Wisła Kraków season =

Wisła Kraków
2026–27 season
- Owner: Jarosław Królewski (majority)
- President: Jarosław Królewski
- Manager: Mariusz Jop
- Stadium: Synerise Arena Kraków
- Ekstraklasa: 1st
- Polish Cup: Pre-season
Home colours	Away colours	Anniversary colours
- All statistics correct as of 27 July 2026.

The 2026–27 season is the 121st season in the history of Wisła Kraków and their first season back in the Ekstraklasa since 2022 following promotion. The club will also compete in the Polish Cup.

== Transfers ==
=== In ===
Pos.	Player	Transferred from	Fee	Date	Source
GK	(Poland) Marcel Łubik	(Germany) FC Augsburg	Loan	1 July 2026	
DF	(France) Maxence Maisonneuve	(Belgium) RAAL La Louvière	Free	1 July 2026	
FW	(France) Élie Youan	(Scotland) Hibernian	Free	10 July 2026	
FW	(Switzerland) Jérémy Guillemenot	(Switzerland) Servette FC	Free	15 July 2026	
FW	(Guinea) Oumar Conté	(Italy) Reggiana	Free	18 July 2026	
MF	(Poland) Olivier Sukiennicki	(Poland) Odra Opole	Loan return	30 June 2026	
MF	(Poland) Wiktor Staszak	(Italy) Lecce U20	Loan return	30 June 2026	
GK	(Poland) Jakub Stępak	(Poland) Stal Stalowa Wola	Loan return	30 June 2026	

=== Out ===
Pos.	Player	Transferred to	Fee	Date	Source
MF	(Albania) Ardit Nikaj	(Albania) KF Skënderbeu	Loan return	30 June 2026	
GK	(Belarus) Anton Chichkan		End of contract	1 July 2026	
DF	(Sweden) Joseph Colley	(Albania) KF Tirana	Free	1 July 2026	
MF	(Poland) Dawid Olejarka	(Poland) Olimpia Grudziądz	Free	1 July 2026	
GK	(Poland) Kamil Broda		End of contract	1 July 2026	
DF	(Poland) Kuba Wiśniewski		End of contract	1 July 2026	
FW	(Poland) Filip Baniowski	(Poland) Podhale Nowy Targ	Loan	July 2026	
FW	(Poland) Szymon Kawała	(Poland) Sandecja Nowy Sącz	Loan	July 2026	

== Pre-season and friendlies ==
27 June 2026 Friendly	Wisła Kraków (Poland)	3–4	(Poland) Bruk-Bet Termalica Nieciecza	Wola Chorzelowska
10:00	Igbekeme 64'; Sánchez 67'; Giger 73'		Zapolnik 13'; Sławiński 53'; Biniek 63'; Durdov 85'	Stadium: Boisko KS Kolorado

1 July 2026 Friendly	Wisła Kraków (Poland)	4–0	(Poland) Puszcza Niepołomice	Wola Chorzelowska
10:00	3'; 4'; 18'; 75'			Stadium: Boisko KS Kolorado

4 July 2026 Friendly	Wisła Kraków (Poland)	2–0	(Czech Republic) Karviná	Myślenice
12:00	Carbó 21'; Staszak 77'			Stadium: Centrum Treningowe

11 July 2026 Friendly	Wisła Kraków (Poland)	0–0	(England) Wrexham	Kraków
15:00				Stadium: Synerise Arena Kraków

12 July 2026 Friendly	Wisła Kraków (Poland)	0–1	(Poland) Podbeskidzie Bielsko-Biała	Myślenice
12:00				Stadium: Centrum Treningowe

18 July 2026 Friendly	Wisła Kraków (Poland)	2–2	(Czech Republic) Artis Brno	Myślenice
11:00				Stadium: Centrum Treningowe

18 July 2026 Friendly	Wisła Kraków (Poland)	1–0	(Czech Republic) Artis Brno	Myślenice
13:00				Stadium: Centrum Treningowe

== Competitions ==
=== Overall record ===
Competition	First match	Last match	Starting round	Final position	Record							
Competition	First match	Last match	Starting round	Final position	Pld	W	D	L	GF	GA	GD	Win %
Ekstraklasa	26 July 2026		Matchday 1	1st	1	1	0	0	2	1	+1	100.00
Polish Cup					0	0	0	0	0	0	+0	—
Total					1	1	0	0	2	1	+1	100.00

Last updated: 27 July 2026
Source: Competitions

=== Ekstraklasa ===
Pos	Team	Pld	W	D	L	GF	GA	GD	Pts
6	Pogoń Szczecin	2	1	0	1	2	1	+1	3
7	Górnik Zabrze	1	1	0	0	2	1	+1	3
8	Wisła Kraków	2	1	0	1	5	5	0	3
9	Śląsk Wrocław	2	1	0	1	3	3	0	3
9	Zagłębie Lubin	2	1	0	1	3	3	0	3

Updated to match(es) played on 3 August 2026. Source: ekstraklasa.org 90minut.pl
Rules for classification: 1) Points; 2) Head-to-head points; 3) Head-to-head goal difference; 4) Goal difference; 5) Goals scored; 6) Number of wins; 7) Number of away wins; 8) Lower number of points based on yellow and red cards (red card = 3 points, yellow card = 1 point, sending-off = 3 points - including 1 point for first yellow card); 9) Fairplay ranking; 10) Draw.
(Note: Head-to-head record is used only after all the matches between the teams in question have been played)

==== Matches ====
26 July 2026 1	Wisła Kraków	2–1	GKS Katowice	Kraków
20:15				Stadium: Synerise Arena Kraków
