= Jacek Izydorczyk =

Polish politician

Prof. Jacek Izydorczyk
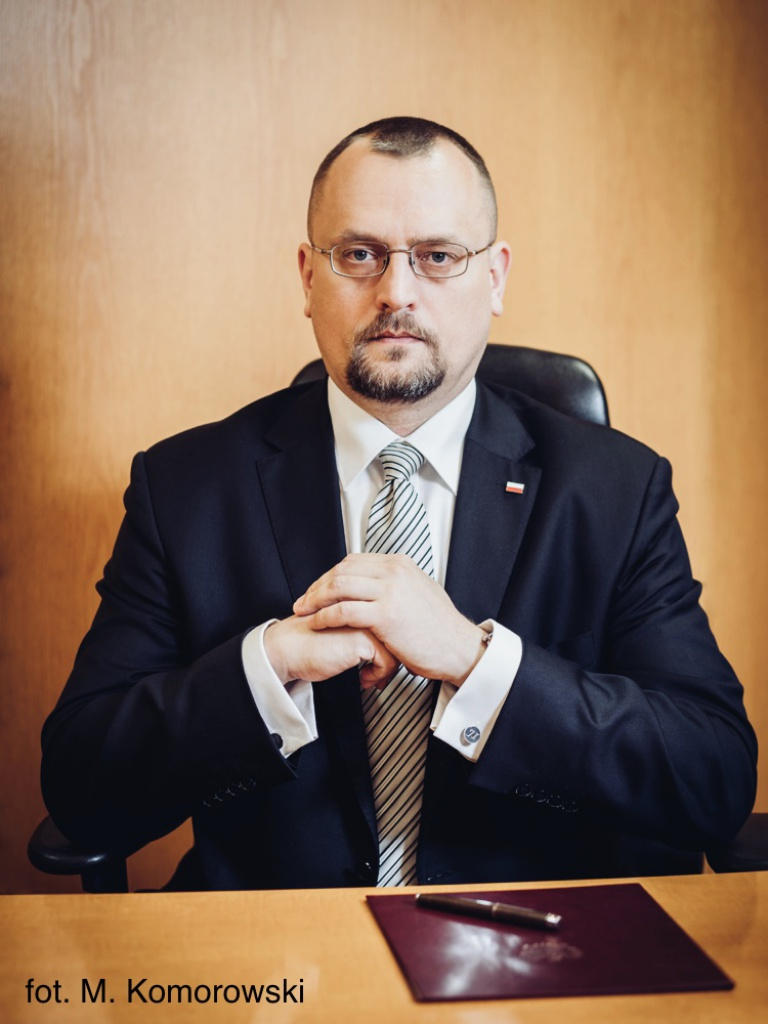

Poland Ambassador to Japan
- In office 9 February 2017 – 31 July 2019
- Preceded by: Cyryl Kozaczewski
- Succeeded by: Paweł Milewski

Personal details
- Born: 1972 (age 53–54) Tomaszów Mazowiecki
- Children: 1 son
- Education: University of Łódź
- Profession: lawyer, lecturer

Jacek Jerzy Izydorczyk (born 1972, Tomaszów Mazowiecki) is a Polish professor of law at the University of Łódź and attorney at law. Poland ambassador to Japan (2017–2019).

== Life ==
Jacek Izydorczyk graduated from the Faculty of Law at the University of Lódź in 1996. Next year he became a lecturer there. He defended his Ph.D. thesis on criminal procedure in 2000. In 2005 he passed judge's national exam. He studied at Kyushu University (2005–2007). In 2011 he attained post-doctoral degree in law and the same year he became a Professor of Law, and in 2013 Head of Department of Special Criminal Proceedings.

He specializes in criminal law, international criminal procedure, criminology, international law comparative law. He has over 100 scientific publications, including in English.

On 9 February 2017 he was appointed as Poland's ambassador to Japan. On 24 May 2017 he presented the letter of credence to the Emperor Akihito. He ended his term on 31 July 2019.

Besides Polish, Izydorczyk speaks English, Russian and, to some extent, Japanese languages. He is married with one son. He practises kendo. In his youth he was professional swimmer, member of the representation of Poland.

== Works ==
- Stosowanie tymczasowego aresztowania w polskim postępowaniu karnym, Kraków: Zakamycze, 2002.
  - English title: The detention pending trial in Polish criminal proceedings
- International Criminal Court = Międzynarodowy Trybunał Karny: powstanie, organizacja, jurysdykcja, akty prawne, Kraków: Zakamycze, 2004.
  - English title: International Criminal Court: history, structure, jurisdiction, legal basis
- Hanzai znaczy przestępstwo: ściganie przestępstw pospolitych oraz white-collar-crimes w Japonii, Warszawa: Wolters Kluwer Polska, 2008.
  - English title: Hanzai – it means crime. Prosecution of crimes and white-collar-crimes in Japan
- Granice orzekania sądu odwoławczego w polskiej procedurze karnej, Łódź: Wydawnictwo Uniwersytetu Łódzkiego, 2010.
  - English title: The boundaries of jurisdiction of the court of appeal in Polish criminal proceedings
- Tomasz Grzegorczyk, Jacek Izydorczyk, Radosław Olszewski (red.), Z problematyki funkcji procesu karnego, Warszawa: Wolters Kluwer Polska, 2013.
  - English title: The problematique of the criminal procedure functions
