= Élie Youan =

French footballer (born 1999)

Personal information
- Full name: Thody Élie Youan
- Date of birth: 7 April 1999 (age 27)
- Place of birth: Nantes, France
- Height: 1.83 m (6 ft 0 in)
- Position: Forward

Team information
- Current team: Wisła Kraków
- Number: 27

Youth career
- 2007–2019: Nantes

Senior career*
Years	Team	Apps	(Gls)
2016–2019	Nantes II	48	(15)
2019–2021	Nantes	6	(0)
2020–2021	→ St. Gallen (loan)	29	(5)
2021–2023	St. Gallen	18	(6)
2022	→ Mechelen (loan)	4	(0)
2022–2023	→ Hibernian (loan)	36	(9)
2023–2026	Hibernian	61	(10)
2026–	Wisła Kraków	4	(1)

International career
2017	France U18	6	(3)
2017–2018	France U19	10	(3)
2018–2019	France U20	7	(2)
- * Club domestic league appearances and goals as of 19:34, 24 August 2026 (UTC)

Thody Élie Youan (born 7 April 1999) is a French professional footballer who plays as a forward for Ekstraklasa club Wisła Kraków.

== Club career ==
On 12 January 2018, Youan signed his first professional contract with his boyhood club FC Nantes. He made his professional debut for Nantes in a 1–0 Ligue 1 loss to RC Strasbourg Alsace on 24 May 2019.

On 17 May 2021, St. Gallen, which previously loaned Youan, exercised the option to purchase his rights.

On 31 January 2022, Youan was loaned to Mechelen in Belgium.

On 25 June 2022, Youan joined Scottish Premiership club Hibernian on a season-long loan deal. Hibs announced in May 2023 that they would sign Youan on a permanent basis, with his contract due to run until end of the 2025–26 season.

On 10 July 2026, Youan joined Ekstraklasa side Wisła Kraków as a free agent, signing a three-year deal.

== International career ==
Youan was born in France to Ivorian parents. He is a youth international for France.

== Career statistics ==
As of match played 10 February 2026

Appearances and goals by club, season and competition
Club	Season	League			National cup (Note: Includes Swiss Cup, Scottish Cup)		League cup (Note: Includes Coupe de la Ligue, Scottish League Cup)		Continental		Other		Total	
Club	Season	Division	Apps	Goals	Apps	Goals	Apps	Goals	Apps	Goals	Apps	Goals	Apps	Goals
Nantes II	2016–17	Championnat de France Amateur	5	2	—		—		—		—		5	2
Nantes II	2017–18	Championnat National 3	17	6	—		—		—		—		17	6
Nantes II	2018–19	Championnat National 2	16	6	—		—		—		—		16	6
Nantes II	2019–20	Championnat National 2	9	1	—		—		—		—		9	1
Nantes II	2020–21	Championnat National 2	1	0	—		—		—		—		1	0
Nantes II	Total		48	15	—		—		—		—		48	15
Nantes	2018–19	Ligue 1	1	0	—		—		—		—		1	0
Nantes	2019–20	Ligue 1	5	0	—		2	1	—		—		7	1
Nantes	Total		6	0	—		2	1	—		—		8	1
St. Gallen (loan)	2020–21	Swiss Super League	29	5	3	0	—		1 (Note: Appearance in UEFA Europa League)	0	—		33	5
St. Gallen	2021–22	Swiss Super League	18	6	2	1	—		—		—		20	7
St. Gallen	Total		47	11	5	1	—		—		—		53	12
Mechelen (loan)	2021–22	Belgian First Division A	4	0	—		—		—		—		4	0
Hibernian (loan)	2022–23	Scottish Premiership	36	9	1	0	0	0	—		—		37	9
Hibernian	2023–24	Scottish Premiership	31	4	3	1	3	2	6 (Note: Appearances in UEFA Europa Conference League)	2	—		43	9
Hibernian	2024–25	Scottish Premiership	13	2	1	0	1	0	—		—		15	2
Hibernian	2025–26	Scottish Premiership	17	4	1	0	1	0	3 (Note: One appearance in UEFA Europa League, two appearances in UEFA Conference League)	0	—		22	4
Hibernian	Total		97	19	6	1	5	2	9	2	—		117	24
Wisła Kraków	2026–27	Ekstraklasa	0	0	0	0	—		—		—		0	0
Career total			202	45	11	2	7	3	10	2	0	0	230	52
