= Maciej Chmieliński =

Polish politician

Maciej Chmieliński Ph.D.
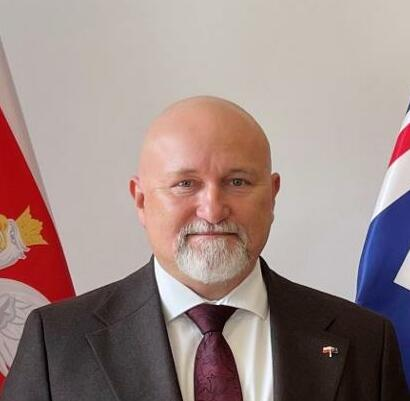
- Maciej Chmieliński (2023)

Poland Ambassador to Australia
- In office 6 September 2023 – July 2024
- Preceded by: Michał Kołodziejski

Personal details
- Born: 7 December 1971 (age 54) Łódź, Poland
- Spouse: Małgorzata Jagas-Chmielińska
- Education: University of Łódź
- Profession: legal scholar, notary, university teacher

Maciej Marcin Chmieliński (born 7 December 1971, Łódź) is a Polish legal scholar, notary, historian of legal doctrines, who serves as the ambassador of Poland to Australia from 2023 to 2024.

== Life ==
Maciej Chmieliński graduated from law at the University of Łódź. In 2003, he defended there his Ph.D. thesis on Wilhelm von Humboldt and Max Stirner; his doctoral advisor was Zbigniew Rau. In 2007, he received Habilitation postdoctoral degree.

Since 2001, he has been working at the University of Łódź. He is associate professor at the Department of Political and Legal Doctrines, Law and Administration Faculty. He was also lecturer at the Łódź Film School, and European School of Law and Administration, among others.

he was co-founder of the Alexis de Tocqueville Center for Political and Legal Thought. He was member of the Council of the Polish-U.S. Fulbright Commission. Editor of the Folia Iuridica journal.

He runs a notary office in Stryków.

In May 2023, he was nominated ambassador of Poland to Australia, based in Canberra, accredited also to Nauru, Fiji, Papua New Guinea, Vanuatu, and Solomon Islands. He began his term on 6 September 2023. He returned to Poland in July 2024.

Besides Polish, he speaks fluently English, and German, as well as basic Russian and Latin. He is married to Małgorzata Jagas-Chmielińska.

== Works ==
- Atomizm a indywidualizm rozważania nad myśla̜ polityczna̜ i prawna̜ Wilhelma von Humboldta, Łódź: Wydawnictwo Uniwersytetu Łódzkiego, 2004, ISBN 83-7171-726-1, OCLC 237085900.
- Max Stirner : jednostka, społeczeństwo, państwo, Kraków: Księgarnia Akademicka, 2006, ISBN 83-7188-857-0, OCLC 500318727.
- Umowa społeczna i jej krytycy w myśli politycznej i prawnej, Warszawa: Wydawnictwo Naukowe Scholar, 2010, ISBN 978-83-7383-232-9, OCLC 750593710.
- Doktryna Polaków : klasyczna filozofia polityczna w dyskursie potocznym, Łódź: Wydawnictwo Uniwersytetu Łódzkiego, 2018, ISBN 978-83-7383-920-5, OCLC 1066102111.
- The philosophy of legal change : theoretical perspectives and practical processes, Abingdon, Oxon: Routledge, 2020, ISBN 978-1-138-58628-4, OCLC 1089840933.
