= Michał Żyro =

Polish footballer (born 1992)

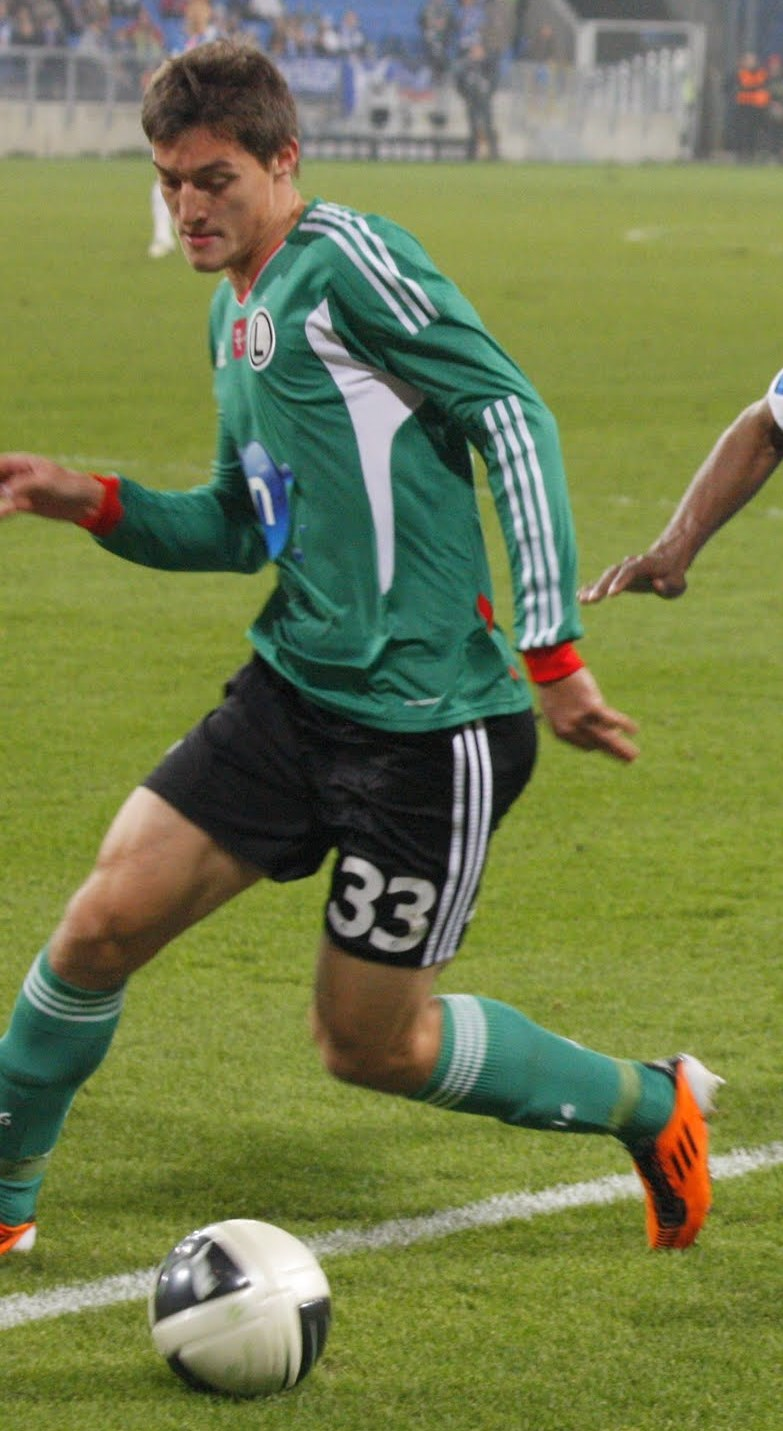

Personal information
- Full name: Michał Żyro
- Date of birth: 20 September 1992 (age 34)
- Place of birth: Warsaw, Poland
- Height: 1.89 m (6 ft 2 in)
- Position: Forward

Youth career
- 1999–2004: KS Piaseczno
- 2005–2009: Legia Warsaw

Senior career*
Years	Team	Apps	(Gls)
2009–2016	Legia Warsaw	96	(13)
2013–2015	Legia Warsaw II	3	(0)
2016–2019	Wolverhampton Wanderers	7	(3)
2018	→ Charlton Athletic (loan)	13	(3)
2018–2019	→ Pogoń Szczecin (loan)	11	(1)
2019	→ Pogoń Szczecin II (loan)	2	(1)
2019–2020	Korona Kielce	13	(1)
2019	Korona Kielce II	6	(4)
2020	→ Stal Mielec (loan)	14	(6)
2020–2021	Piast Gliwice	30	(4)
2021–2022	Jagiellonia Białystok	13	(1)
2022	Jagiellonia Białystok II	1	(1)
2022–2024	Wisła Kraków	34	(5)
Total		243	(43)

International career
2010–2011	Poland U19	6	(3)
2012–2014	Poland U21	9	(1)
2014	Poland	4	(0)
- * Club domestic league appearances and goals

Michał Żyro (Polish pronunciation: [ˈmixaw ˈʐɨrɔ]; born 20 September 1992) is a Polish football pundit, co-commentator and former professional player who played as a forward. Following retirement, he joined Canal+'s Ekstraklasa coverage team.

Żyro has played for Legia Warsaw, Korona Kielce, Pogoń Szczecin, Stal Mielec, Piast Gliwice, Jagiellonia Białystok and Wisła Kraków in Poland, as well as Wolverhampton Wanderers and Charlton Athletic in England.

== Club career ==
Żyro spent five years playing in KS Piaseczno as a youth team player before joining the youth academy at Legia Warsaw at the age of 13. When he was 17, Żyro was promoted to the senior team and ultimately the first team squad. He spent six years in the senior team scoring 13 goals in 96 matches.

On 24 December, he signed a three-and-a-half-year contract with Wolverhampton Wanderers for an undisclosed fee. He joined the club officially when the transfer window re-opened on 2 January.

He made his debut for Wolverhampton Wanderers on 9 January 2016 in an FA Cup tie against West Ham United. On 12 January 2016, he scored his first goals for the club on his home and league debut, scoring twice in a 3–2 win against Fulham. Żyro scored his third goal for Wolves in a 1–3 loss against Cardiff City, shortly afterwards, he suffered a calf injury, putting him out of the game for up to six weeks. On 6 April, shortly after returning from injury, Żyro was on the receiving end of a reckless challenge from Milton Keynes Dons defender Antony Kay, causing multiple ligament damage and a fracture in his knee, ruling him out for up to 16 months. He finally made his return to competitive football almost 17 months later, on 23 August 2017 as a substitute in a 2–0 away win against Southampton in the EFL Cup.

On 22 January 2018 he joined Charlton Athletic on loan. On 31 August 2018 he joined Pogoń Szczecin on loan.

Żyro joined Korona Kielce on 28 June 2019 on a one-year contract.

== Career statistics ==
Appearances and goals by club, season and competition
Club	Season	League			National cup (Note: Includes Polish Cup, FA Cup)		League cup (Note: Includes EFL Cup)		Europe		Other		Total	
Club	Season	Division	Apps	Goals	Apps	Goals	Apps	Goals	Apps	Goals	Apps	Goals	Apps	Goals
Legia Warsaw	2009–10	Ekstraklasa	1	0	1	0	—		0	0	0	0	2	0
Legia Warsaw	2010–11	Ekstraklasa	6	0	2	0	—		0	0	0	0	8	0
Legia Warsaw	2011–12	Ekstraklasa	25	1	7	4	—		11 (Note: Appearances in UEFA Europa League)	0	0	0	43	5
Legia Warsaw	2012–13	Ekstraklasa	9	2	2	2	—		5	1	1 (Note: Appearance in Polish Super Cup)	0	17	5
Legia Warsaw	2013–14	Ekstraklasa	23	4	0	0	—		8 (Note: Six appearances in UEFA Champions League, two appearances in UEFA Europa League)	0	0	0	31	4
Legia Warsaw	2014–15	Ekstraklasa	27	5	5	3	—		13 (Note: Four appearances and three goals in UEFA Champions League, nine appearances in Europa League)	3	0	0	45	11
Legia Warsaw	2015–16	Ekstraklasa	5	1	1	0	—		4	0	1	1	11	2
Legia Warsaw	Total		96	13	18	9	—		41	4	2	1	157	27
Legia Warsaw II	2013–14	III liga, gr. A	1	0	—		—		—		—		1	0
Legia Warsaw II	2015–16	III liga, gr. A	2	0	—		—		—		—		2	0
Legia Warsaw II	Total		3	0	—		—		—		—		3	0
Wolverhampton Wanderers	2015–16	Championship	7	3	1	0	0	0	—		—		8	3
Wolverhampton Wanderers	2016–17	Championship	0	0	0	0	0	0	—		—		0	0
Wolverhampton Wanderers	2017–18	Championship	0	0	0	0	2	0	—		—		2	0
Wolverhampton Wanderers	2018–19	Premier League	0	0	0	0	0	0	—		—		0	0
Wolverhampton Wanderers	Total		7	3	1	0	2	0	0	0	0	0	10	3
Charlton Athletic (loan)	2017–18	League One	13	3	—		—		—		1 (Note: Appearance in EFL League One play-offs)	0	14	3
Pogoń Szczecin (loan)	2018–19	Ekstraklasa	11	1	—		—		—		—		11	1
Pogoń Szczecin II (loan)	2018–19	III liga, gr. II	2	1	—		—		—		—		2	1
Korona Kielce	2019–20	Ekstraklasa	13	1	1	0	—		—		—		14	1
Korona Kielce II	2019–20	III liga, gr. IV	6	4	—		—		—		—		6	4
Stal Mielec (loan)	2019–20	I liga	14	6	1	0	—		—		—		15	6
Piast Gliwice	2020–21	Ekstraklasa	26	4	4	0	—		3	1	—		33	5
Piast Gliwice	2021–22	Ekstraklasa	4	0	0	0	—		—		—		4	0
Piast Gliwice	Total		30	4	4	0	—		3	1	—		37	5
Jagiellonia Białystok	2021–22	Ekstraklasa	13	1	0	0	—		—		—		13	1
Jagiellonia II	2021–22	III liga, gr. I	1	1	—		—		—		—		1	1
Wisła Kraków	2022–23	I liga	26	4	2	0	—		—		1 (Note: Appearance in I liga promotion play-offs)	0	29	4
Wisła Kraków	2023–24	I liga	8	1	3	0	—		—		—		11	1
Wisła Kraków	Total		34	5	5	0	—		—		1	0	40	5
Career total			243	43	30	9	2	0	44	5	4	1	323	58

== Personal life ==
His younger brother Mateusz (born in 1998) is also a professional football player.

== Honours ==
Legia Warsaw

- Ekstraklasa: 2012–13, 2014–15, 2015–16
- Polish Cup: 2010–11, 2011–12, 2012–13, 2014–15, 2015–16

Stal Mielec

- I liga: 2019–20

Wisła Kraków

- Polish Cup: 2023–24

Individual

- Polish Cup top scorer: 2011–12
- I liga Player of the Month: July 2022
