= Jakub Niewiadomski =

Polish footballer

Personal information
- Date of birth: 9 April 2002 (age 24)
- Place of birth: Koło, Poland
- Height: 1.83 m (6 ft 0 in)
- Position: Left-back

Team information
- Current team: Pogoń Grodzisk Mazowiecki
- Number: 17

Youth career
- Zryw Dąbie
- 2012–2015: Górnik Konin
- 2015–2019: Lech Poznań

Senior career*
Years	Team	Apps	(Gls)
2019–2022	Lech Poznań II	26	(0)
2020–2022	Lech Poznań	0	(0)
2021	→ GKS Jastrzębie (loan)	24	(3)
2022–2023	Wisła Kraków	3	(0)
2023–2024	Wisła Kraków II	30	(7)
2024–	Pogoń Grodzisk Mazowiecki	34	(2)

International career
2017–2018	Poland U16	9	(0)
2018–2019	Poland U17	9	(0)
2020	Poland U19	2	(0)
2022	Poland U20	1	(0)
- * Club domestic league appearances and goals as of 19:39, 26 May 2026 (UTC)

Jakub Niewiadomski (born 9 April 2002) is a Polish professional footballer who plays as a left-back for I liga club Pogoń Grodzisk Mazowiecki.

== Club career ==
=== Lech Poznań ===
Jakub Niewiadomski signed a professional contract with Lech Poznań II on 1 July 2018. He was promoted to Lech Poznań in January 2020 and attended a training camp abroad. He made his debut for the Niewiadomski club on 2 November 2020 in the cup with a 2–3 win over Znicz Pruszkow, replacing Dani Ramírez from the reserve at the 76th minute.

=== GKS Jastrzębie (loan) ===
Niewiadomski joined GKS Jastrzębie on loan on 22 January 2021. Niewiadomski made his debut for the club on 6 March 2021, with a 2–0 win over Korona Kielce in the league match, with a 90th minute substitute. Niewiadomski scored his first goal for the club on 5 June 2021 in the 62nd minute in a 0–2 victory over GKS Belchatow in the league match. He returned to Lech Poznań on 31 December 2021.

=== Wisła Kraków ===
In the summer of 2022, he transferred to Wisła Kraków, one of the oldest clubs in the country, for free and signed a two-year contract. Niewiadomski made his debut for the club on 20 August 2022, with a 3–0 win against Skra Częstochowa in the league as a substitute in the 90th minute. His final senior team appearance for Wisła came on 30 September that year, playing the first 45 minutes of a 1–0 away loss to Chojniczanka Chojnice.

For the 2023–24 season, Niewiadomski was moved to a refounded reserve team, competing in the Lesser Poland group of the IV liga. He made 30 appearances and scored seven goals as Wisła II were crowned champions and returned to the fourth division after a seven-year absence. At the conclusion of the season, Niewiadomski was released by the club.

=== Pogoń Grodzisk Mazowiecki ===
On 10 July 2024, Niewiadomski joined II liga returnees Pogoń Grodzisk Mazowiecki on a deal until the end of the season, with an option for a further year.

== International career ==
He has been capped at youth level for Poland.

== Career statistics ==
As of match played 24 May 2026

Appearances and goals by club, season and competition
Club	Season	League			Polish Cup		Continental		Other		Total	
Club	Season	Division	Apps	Goals	Apps	Goals	Apps	Goals	Apps	Goals	Apps	Goals
Lech Poznań II	2018–19	III liga, gr. II	2	0	—		—		—		2	0
Lech Poznań II	2019–20	II liga	12	0	—		—		—		12	0
Lech Poznań II	2020–21	II liga	9	0	0	0	—		—		9	0
Lech Poznań II	2021–22	II liga	3	0	—		—		—		3	0
Lech Poznań II	Total		26	0	0	0	—		—		26	0
Lech Poznań	2020–21	Ekstraklasa	0	0	1	0	—		—		1	0
GKS Jastrzębie (loan)	2020–21	I liga	11	1	—		—		—		11	1
GKS Jastrzębie (loan)	2021–22	I liga	13	2	2	0	—		—		15	2
GKS Jastrzębie (loan)	Total		24	3	2	0	—		—		26	3
Wisła Kraków	2022–23	I liga	3	0	1	0	—		—		4	0
Wisła Kraków II	2023–24	IV liga Les. Pol.	30	7	—		—		—		30	7
Pogoń Grodzisk Mazowiecki	2024–25	II liga	23	1	2	0	—		—		25	1
Pogoń Grodzisk Mazowiecki	2025–26	I liga	11	1	0	0	—		—		11	1
Pogoń Grodzisk Mazowiecki	Total		34	2	2	0	—		—		36	2
Career total			117	12	6	0	—		—		123	12

== Honours ==
Lech Poznań II

- III liga, group II: 2018–19

Wisła Kraków II

- IV liga Lesser Poland: 2023–24
