= Paweł Milewski =

Polish diplomat

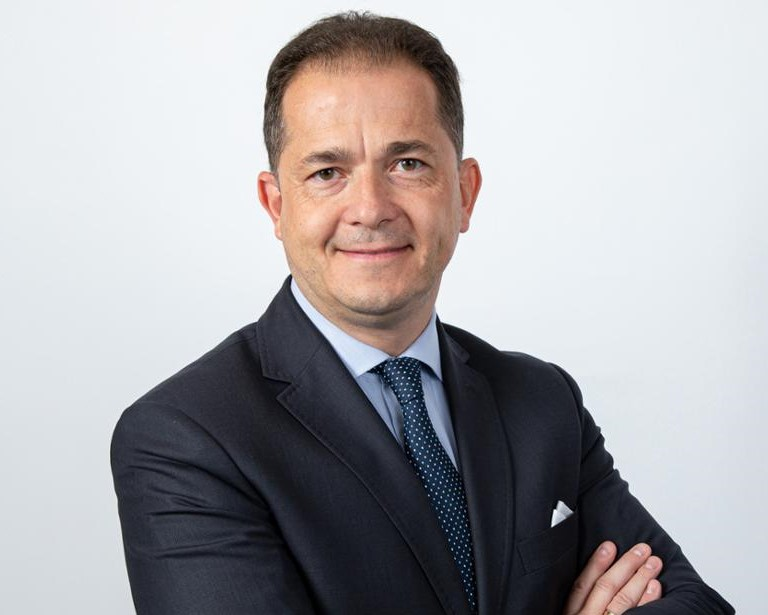

Poland Ambassador to Australia
- In office April 2013 – 2017
- Preceded by: Andrzej Jaroszyński
- Succeeded by: Michał Kołodziejski

Poland Ambassador to Japan
- In office 15 October 2019 – September 2026
- Preceded by: Jacek Izydorczyk

Personal details
- Born: 15 April 1975 (age 51) Warsaw
- Children: 3 sons
- Education: Adam Mickiewicz University in Poznań
- Profession: Diplomat

Paweł Milewski (born 15 April 1975, in Warsaw) is a Polish diplomat; ambassador to Australia (2013–2017) and Japan (2019–2026).

== Life ==
Milewski grew up in Warsaw where he finished high school. has graduated from Adam Mickiewicz University in Poznań, Faculty of China Studies (MA, 1999). He has been studying also at the Beijing Capital Normal University (1996–1997), Xiamen University (1997–1998), and Warsaw School of Economics (2002–2003).

In 1999, he joined the Ministry of Foreign Affairs of Poland. Between 2000 and 2003 he was Attaché and Third Secretary at the Asia-Pacific Department. From 2003 to 2009 he was serving as Second and First Secretary at the embassy in Beijing. Following his work as Head of the MFA East Asia and Pacific Division (2009–2011), he became deputy director of the Asia-Pacific Department. From 2011, as its director. In 2013, he was nominated Poland ambassador to Australia, presenting his etter of credence to the Governor-General Quentin Bryce on 30 April 2013. He was additionally accredited to Papua New Guinea, presenting credentials to the Governor-General Michael Ogio on 30 October 2013. In 2017, he returned to the MFA, Asia-Pacific Department, as a director. On 1 October 2019, he was nominated Poland ambassador to Japan, arriving to Tokyo within forthnight. During the 2020 Olympic Games held in 2021, Ambassador Milewski helped Belarusian-Polish sprinter Krystsina Tsimanouskaya’s defect after she refused to return home. In September 2026 he ended his mission in Tokyo.

Besides Polish, Milewski speaks English, French, and Chinese. He is married, with three sons.
