= Manu Molina =

Spanish footballer (born 1991)

Personal information
- Full name: Manuel Antonio Molina Valero
- Date of birth: 20 November 1991 (age 34)
- Place of birth: Huelva, Spain
- Height: 1.75 m (5 ft 9 in)
- Position: Attacking midfielder

Team information
- Current team: Odisha
- Number: 12

Youth career
- Recreativo
- 2006–2009: Espanyol

Senior career*
Years	Team	Apps	(Gls)
2009–2011	Espanyol B	41	(4)
2010–2012	Espanyol	7	(0)
2011–2012	→ Huesca (loan)	23	(1)
2012–2014	Valencia B	71	(13)
2014–2016	Recreativo	62	(4)
2016–2017	Deportivo La Coruña B	26	(5)
2017–2018	Lleida Esportiu	30	(1)
2018–2019	Salamanca	32	(2)
2019–2020	Linense	28	(3)
2020–2022	Ibiza	58	(0)
2022–2023	Zaragoza	25	(0)
2023–2025	Málaga	66	(1)
2025–2026	Eldense	34	(0)
2026–	Odisha	2	(0)
- * Club domestic league appearances and goals as of 17 October 2026

Manuel "Manu" Antonio Molina Valero (born 20 November 1991) is a Spanish professional footballer who plays as an attacking midfielder for Indian Super League club Odisha.

== Club career ==
Born in Huelva, Andalusia, Molina was a product of his local club Recreativo de Huelva's youth system. After completing his development at RCD Espanyol, he made his first-team debut at the age of 18, playing the last minute of the 3–1 La Liga home win over Getafe CF on 29 August 2010. One month later, he started and finished the match at Real Madrid, a 3–0 loss.

Molina was loaned to SD Huesca of Segunda División for the 2011–12 season. He scored his first goal for the Aragonese on 17 September 2011, in a 3–3 home draw against CD Alcoyano.

In the following campaigns, Molina represented a host of sides in the Segunda División B. The exception to this was 2014–15, when he appeared in the second tier with Recreativo.

Molina returned to the professional leagues in the 2021–22 season, after achieving promotion with UD Ibiza. In the second division, he later was a part of Real Zaragoza and Málaga CF.

On 31 August 2025, Molina signed a two-year contract with Primera Federación's CD Eldense. He contributed 34 games and five assists in his only season as the club won promotion, but was released after not accepting a salary cut.
