= Mikołaj Biegański =

Polish footballer

Personal information
- Full name: Mikołaj Biegański
- Date of birth: 5 April 2002 (age 24)
- Place of birth: Częstochowa, Poland
- Height: 1.90 m (6 ft 3 in)
- Position: Goalkeeper

Youth career
- 2009–2012: Raków Częstochowa
- 2012–2017: Skra Częstochowa

Senior career*
Years	Team	Apps	(Gls)
2017–2021	Skra Częstochowa	69	(0)
2021–2024	Wisła Kraków	50	(0)
2023	Wisła Kraków II	5	(0)
2024	→ San Jose Earthquakes (loan)	0	(0)
2024	→ The Town FC (loan)	7	(0)
2024–2026	Widzew Łódź	0	(0)
2026	Widzew Łódź II	1	(0)

International career
2017–2018	Poland U16	3	(0)
2018–2019	Poland U17	7	(0)
2022	Poland U20	2	(0)
2023	Poland U21	1	(0)
- * Club domestic league appearances and goals as of 17:07, 29 May 2026 (UTC)

Mikołaj Biegański (born 5 April 2002) is a Polish professional footballer who plays as a goalkeeper.
