= Jakub Górski =

Polish philosopher (c. 1525 – 1583)

Jakub Górski (c. 1525 – 1583) was a Polish Renaissance philosopher.

== Life ==
Jakub Górski was an early Polish representative of Stoicism. He wrote a famous Dialectic (1563) and many works in grammar, rhetoric, theology and sociology. A professor at Kraków University, he was an erudite man whose Dialectic gives evidence of extensive acquaintance with new currents and authors, but he was more erudite than independent as a thinker. He tended to eclecticism and sought to reconcile the Stoics with Aristotle.

== See also ==
- History of philosophy in Poland
- List of Poles
