= Mateusz Młyński =

Polish footballer

Personal information
- Full name: Mateusz Młyński
- Date of birth: 2 January 2001 (age 25)
- Place of birth: Gdynia, Poland
- Height: 1.78 m (5 ft 10 in)
- Position: Winger

Team information
- Current team: Polonia Warsaw
- Number: 11

Youth career
- 2011–2014: GKS Przodkowo
- 2014–2018: Arka Gdynia

Senior career*
Years	Team	Apps	(Gls)
2018–2021	Arka Gdynia	54	(4)
2019	Arka Gdynia II	2	(0)
2021–2025	Wisła Kraków	52	(5)
2023–2024	→ Górnik Łęczna (loan)	18	(2)
2024–2025	Wisła Kraków II	14	(8)
2025–	Polonia Warsaw	14	(0)

International career
2018	Poland U17	2	(0)
2018	Poland U18	2	(0)
2018	Poland U19	3	(0)
2021	Poland U21	3	(0)
- * Club domestic league appearances and goals as of 15:23, 29 May 2026 (UTC)

Mateusz Młyński (born 2 January 2001) is a Polish professional footballer who plays as a winger for I liga club Polonia Warsaw.

== Honours ==
Polonia Warsaw II

- V liga Masovia I: 2025–26
