= Émile Thiakane =

Senegalese footballer (born 1991)

Personal information
- Full name: Émile Laurent Diokel Thiakane
- Date of birth: 17 November 1991 (age 34)
- Place of birth: Pikine, Senegal
- Height: 1.90 m (6 ft 3 in)
- Positions: Attacking midfielder; forward

Senior career*
Years	Team	Apps	(Gls)
2008–2010	ASC HLM Dakar		
2010	Lider Włocławek		
2011	Zawisza Bydgoszcz	5	(0)
2011–2012	Włocłavia Włocławek		
2012–2013	Romilly		
2013–2014	Olympique Saint-Quentin	19	(0)
2014–2015	Pogoń Mogilno	23	(5)
2015–2017	Sokół Kleczew	49	(12)
2017–2020	GKS Bełchatów	76	(8)
2020–2021	Korona Kielce	27	(3)
2021–2023	Puszcza Niepołomice	67	(5)
2023–2024	Wisła Płock	19	(1)
2024	Wisła Płock II	3	(0)
- * Club domestic league appearances and goals as of 12:44, 31 May 2024 (UTC)

Émile Laurent Diokel Thiakane (born 17 November 1991) is a Senegalese professional footballer.

== Career ==
In 2010, Thiakane signed for Polish lower league side Lider Włocławek after being spotted at a tournament in the country.

In 2013, he signed for Olympique Saint-Quentin in the French fifth division.

In 2014, he joined Polish fourth division team Pogoń Mogilno.

In 2020, Thiakane signed for Korona Kielce in the Polish second division.

On 17 August 2023, after spending two years with Puszcza Niepołomice, with whom he won promotion to and made his debut in Ekstraklasa, Thiakane joined I liga side Wisła Płock on a one-year contract, with an option for another year. The extension option was not picked up, and he left the club at the end of June 2024.

== Honours ==
Wisła Płock II

- IV liga Masovia: 2023–24
