= Julien Tadrowski =

French-Polish footballer (born 1993)

Personal information
- Full name: Julien Tadrowski
- Date of birth: 17 May 1993 (age 33)
- Place of birth: Roncq, France
- Height: 1.83 m (6 ft 0 in)
- Position: Defender

Team information
- Current team: Świdniczanka Świdnik

Youth career
- US Tourcoing FC
- 2001–2012: Lille OSC

Senior career*
Years	Team	Apps	(Gls)
2012	Lille OSC B	1	(0)
2012	Arka Gdynia	16	(0)
2013–2014	Pogoń Szczecin	2	(0)
2013–2014	→ Górnik Łęczna (loan)	22	(0)
2014	→ Dolcan Ząbki (loan)	9	(0)
2015	Widzew Łódź	1	(0)
2016–2018	Motor Lublin	62	(4)
2018–2019	Stal Rzeszów	12	(1)
2019	Mieszko Gniezno	4	(0)
2019	Stal Kraśnik	13	(1)
2020	KSZO Ostrowiec	1	(0)
2020–2021	Stal Kraśnik	16	(1)
2021–2022	Pogoń Siedlce	25	(2)
2022	KS Lublinianka	12	(0)
2022–2025	Legia Warsaw II	53	(6)
2025–2026	MKS Piaseczno	13	(3)
2026	Talent Warsaw	13	(0)
2026–	Świdniczanka Świdnik	0	(0)

International career
2009	Poland U17	2	(0)
2010	Poland U18	1	(0)
2010	Poland U19	7	(0)
2012	Poland U20	4	(0)
2013	Poland U21	4	(0)
- * Club domestic league appearances and goals as of 14:12, 23 July 2026 (UTC)

Julien Tadrowski (born 17 May 1993) is a professional footballer who plays as a defender for IV liga Lublin club Świdniczanka Świdnik. He has also served as the assistant coach of Legia Warsaw's under-19 team from 2025 to 2026. Born in France, he represented Poland at youth international levels and has spent most of his career with Polish clubs.

== Club career ==
Tadrowski spent 10 years playing for various academy teams at Lille OSC. In July 2012, he signed a two-year contract with Arka Gdynia. He then joined Pogoń Szczecin, signing a three-year contract.

== International career ==
He was a part of the Poland national under-21 team.

== Honours ==
Motor Lublin

- III liga Lublin–Subcarpathia: 2015–16
- Polish Cup (Lublin County regionals); 2015–16, 2016–17

KSZO Ostrowiec

- Polish Cup (Świętokrzyskie regionals): 2019–20

Lublinianka

- IV liga Lublin: 2021–22

Legia Warsaw II

- Polish Cup (Masovia regionals): 2022–23, 2024–25
