= Kamil Broda =

Polish footballer (born 2001)

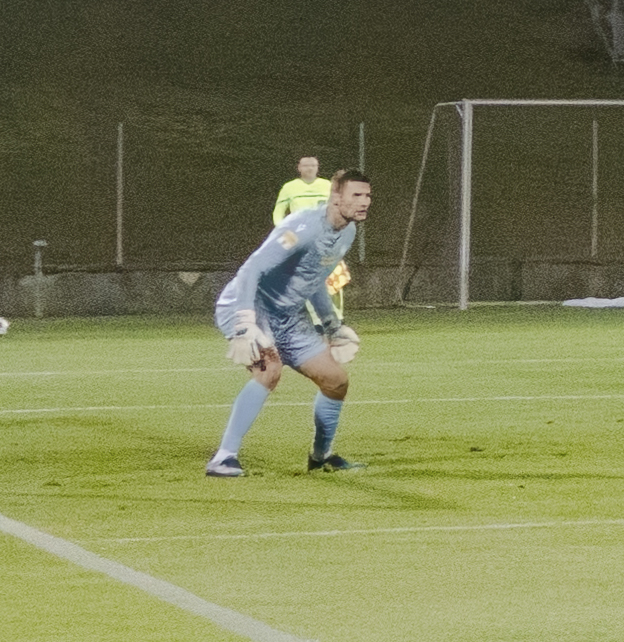
- Broda with Wisła Kraków in 2022

Personal information
- Date of birth: 19 July 2001 (age 25)
- Place of birth: Kraków, Poland
- Height: 1.90 m (6 ft 3 in)
- Position: Goalkeeper

Youth career
- –2014: Wawel Kraków
- 2014–2018: Wisła Kraków

Senior career*
| Years | Team | Apps | (Gls) |
| 2018–2026 | Wisła Kraków | 20 | (0) |
| 2021–2022 | → Chojniczanka Chojnice (loan) | 32 | (0) |
| 2023–2026 | Wisła Kraków II | 25 | (0) |

International career
| 2019 | Poland U18 | 2 | (0) |
| 2019 | Poland U19 | 2 | (0) |
- * Club domestic league appearances and goals as of 13:59, 26 May 2026 (UTC)

Kamil Broda (born 19 July 2001) is a Polish professional footballer who plays as a goalkeeper.

== Club career ==
Broda started his senior career with his hometown club Wisła Kraków. In 2021, he was sent on loan to II liga side Chojniczanka Chojnice, whom he aided in gaining promotion to the second-tier. During the 2023–24 season, he played in the early rounds of Wisła's successful Polish Cup campaign. Later throughout the year, calls were made by fans for Broda to become the first-choice goalkeeper, as "fans... some of them have been demanding for a long time that... [he] replaces the Spaniard Álvaro Ratón".

On 3 July 2024, he signed a two-year contract extension. Broda left Wisła after twelve years when his contract expired in June 2026.

== Career statistics ==
As of match played 23 May 2026

Appearances and goals by club, season and competition
| Club | Season | League | | | Polish Cup | | Europe | | Other | | Total | |
| Club | Season | Division | Apps | Goals | Apps | Goals | Apps | Goals | Apps | Goals | Apps | Goals |
|---|---|---|---|---|---|---|---|---|---|---|---|---|
| Chojniczanka Chojnice (loan) | 2021–22 | II liga | 32 | 0 | 0 | 0 | — | | — | | 32 | 0 |
| Wisła Kraków | 2022–23 | I liga | 4 | 0 | 2 | 0 | — | | — | | 6 | 0 |
| Wisła Kraków | 2023–24 | I liga | 2 | 0 | 3 | 0 | — | | — | | 5 | 0 |
| Wisła Kraków | 2024–25 | I liga | 4 | 0 | 0 | 0 | 4 (Note: Appearances in UEFA Conference League) | 0 | 1 (Note: Appearance in I liga promotion play-offs) | 0 | 9 | 0 |
| Wisła Kraków | 2025–26 | I liga | 9 | 0 | 2 | 0 | — | | — | | 11 | 0 |
| Wisła Kraków | Total | | 19 | 0 | 7 | 0 | 4 | 0 | 1 | 0 | 31 | 0 |
| Wisła Kraków II | 2023–24 | IV liga L. Pol. | 9 | 0 | — | | — | | — | | 9 | 0 |
| Wisła Kraków II | 2024–25 | III liga, gr. IV | 9 | 0 | — | | — | | — | | 9 | 0 |
| Wisła Kraków II | 2025–26 | III liga, gr. IV | 7 | 0 | — | | — | | — | | 7 | 0 |
| Wisła Kraków II | Total | | 25 | 0 | — | | — | | — | | 25 | 0 |
| Career total | | | 76 | 0 | 7 | 0 | 4 | 0 | 1 | 0 | 88 | 0 |

== Honours ==
Wisła Kraków

- I liga: 2025–26
- Polish Cup: 2023–24

Wisła Kraków II

- IV liga Lesser Poland: 2023–24
