= Boris Moltenis =

Martiniquais footballer (born 1999)

Personal information
- Full name: Boris Sébastien Moltenis
- Date of birth: 8 May 1999 (age 27)
- Place of birth: Belfort, France
- Height: 1.84 m (6 ft 0 in)
- Position: Centre-back

Team information
- Current team: Villefranche
- Number: 5

Youth career
- 2008–2011: Andelnans
- 2011–2014: Belfort
- 2014–2018: Sochaux

Senior career*
Years	Team	Apps	(Gls)
2016–2020	Sochaux II	16	(0)
2018–2021	Sochaux	20	(0)
2021–2022	Boulogne	27	(2)
2022–2023	Wisła Kraków	23	(4)
2023–2024	Austria Lustenau	11	(0)
2024–2025	Sochaux	33	(3)
2025–2026	Ponferradina	18	(1)
2026–	Villefranche	7	(0)

International career^{‡}
2023–	Martinique	10	(1)
- * Club domestic league appearances and goals as of 08:05, 29 September 2026 (UTC) ‡ National team caps and goals as of 09:08, 6 October 2026 (UTC)

Boris Sébastien Moltenis (born 8 May 1999) is a professional footballer who plays as a centre-back for Ligue 3 club Villefranche. Born in metropolitan France, he plays for the Martinique national team.

== Club career ==
Moltenis is a youth product of the youth academy of Sochaux having joined the club in 2014. On 19 October 2018, He made his professional debut with Sochaux in a 2–1 Ligue 2 win over ESTAC Troyes. On 27 October 2018, he signed his first professional contract with Sochaux for three seasons.

On 23 July 2021, Moltenis moved to Boulogne and signed a two-year contract.

On 31 August 2022, he joined Polish I liga side Wisła Kraków on a one-year contract with an extension option. On 15 March 2023, his deal was extended until June 2024 after Moltenis met the required minimum playing time condition set in his contract.

On 16 August 2023, Austrian side Austria Lustenau announced the signing of Moltenis on a two-year deal.

On 26 January 2024, Moltenis returned to Sochaux until the end of the season.

== Personal life ==
Moltenis was born in Metropolitan France to a Martiniquais father and French mother.

== Career statistics ==
=== International ===
As of match played 5 October 2026

Appearances and goals by national team and year
National team	Year	Apps	Goals
Martinique
Martinique	2023	2	0
Martinique	2024	2	0
Martinique	2025	1	0
Martinique	2026	5	0
Total		10	1

Scores and results list Martinique's goal tally first, score column indicates score after each Moltenis goal.

List of international goals scored by Boris Moltenis
No.	Date	Venue	Opponent	Score	Result	Competition
1	28 September 2026	Dr. Ir. Franklin Essed Stadion, Paramaribo, Suriname	Suriname	1–2	1–2	2026–27 CONCACAF Nations League A
