= Michał Kołodziejski =

Polish diplomat

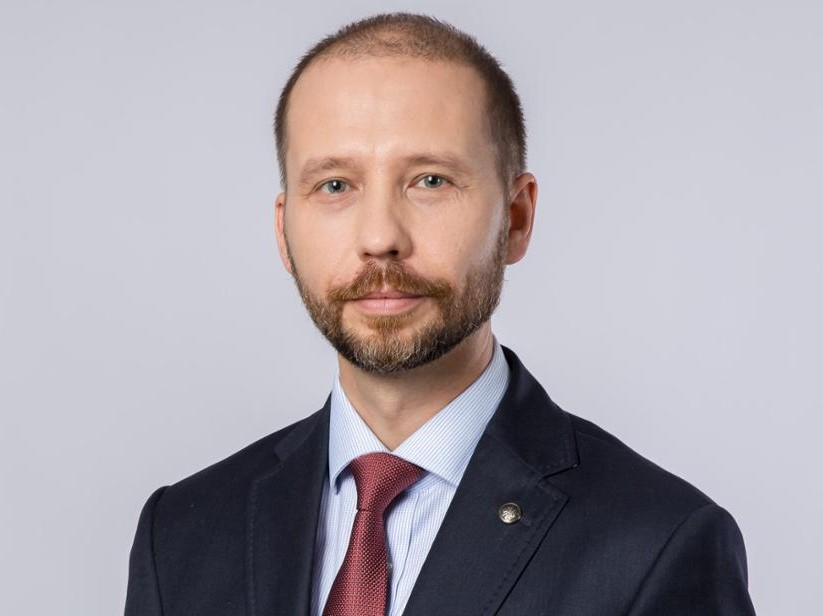

Poland Consul-General in Hong Kong and Macau
- Incumbent
- Assumed office 20 September 2023
- Preceded by: Aleksander Dańda

Poland Ambassador to Australia
- In office 26 November 2017 – 15 August 2022
- Preceded by: Paweł Milewski
- Succeeded by: Maciej Chmieliński

Personal details
- Born: 12 February 1975 (age 51)
- Children: 2
- Education: University of Warsaw
- Profession: diplomat

Michał Kołodziejski (born 12 February 1975) is a Polish diplomat specializing in the Asia-Pacific region. He served as the Ambassador of Poland to Australia from 2017 to 2022 and has been the Consul General in Hong Kong and Macau since 2023.

== Life ==
Michał Kołodziejski graduated from the University of Warsaw with degrees in Japanese studies and management. He also studied at Kanazawa University in Japan and completed a Ph.D. course at Warsaw School of Economics.

In 2003 he joined the Ministry of Foreign Affairs. He worked at the Embassy of Poland in Singapore, and then as a deputy director and director of Asia-Pacific Department (2014–2017). On 26 November 2017 he began his term as Ambassador of Poland to Australia, based in Canberra, accredited also to Papua New Guinea, Fiji, Federated States of Micronesia, Nauru, Vanuatu, Marshall Islands and Solomon Islands. He presented his credentials to the Governor-General of Australia Peter Cosgrove on 2 February 2018, to the president of Fiji George Konrote on 12 February 2019, to the president of the Federated States of Micronesia Peter M. Christian on 18 March 2019. He ended his term on 15 August 2022. From 1 October 2022 to 19 September 2023 he served as Deputy Director of the MFA's Asia-Pacific Department. Since 20 September 2023 he has been serving as Consul-General in Hong Kong.

In addition to Polish, he speaks English, Japanese and Russian. He is married and has two daughters.

== Works ==
- Takahashi Korekiyo 1854–1936 a gospodarka międzywojennej Japonii, Warszawa: Trio, 2004.
