= Kumköy, Aksu =

Kumköy
- Neighbourhood
- Location in Turkey
- Coordinates: 36.8806°N 30.9554°E
- Country: Turkey
- Province: Antalya
- District: Aksu
- Population (2022): 1,399
- Time zone: UTC+3 (TRT)

Kumköy is a neighbourhood of the municipality and district of Aksu, Antalya Province, Turkey. Its population is 1,399 (2022). It was administratively a part of Serik District until 2001, when it was transferred to Aksu District.
