= Ángel Rodado =

Spanish footballer (born 1997)

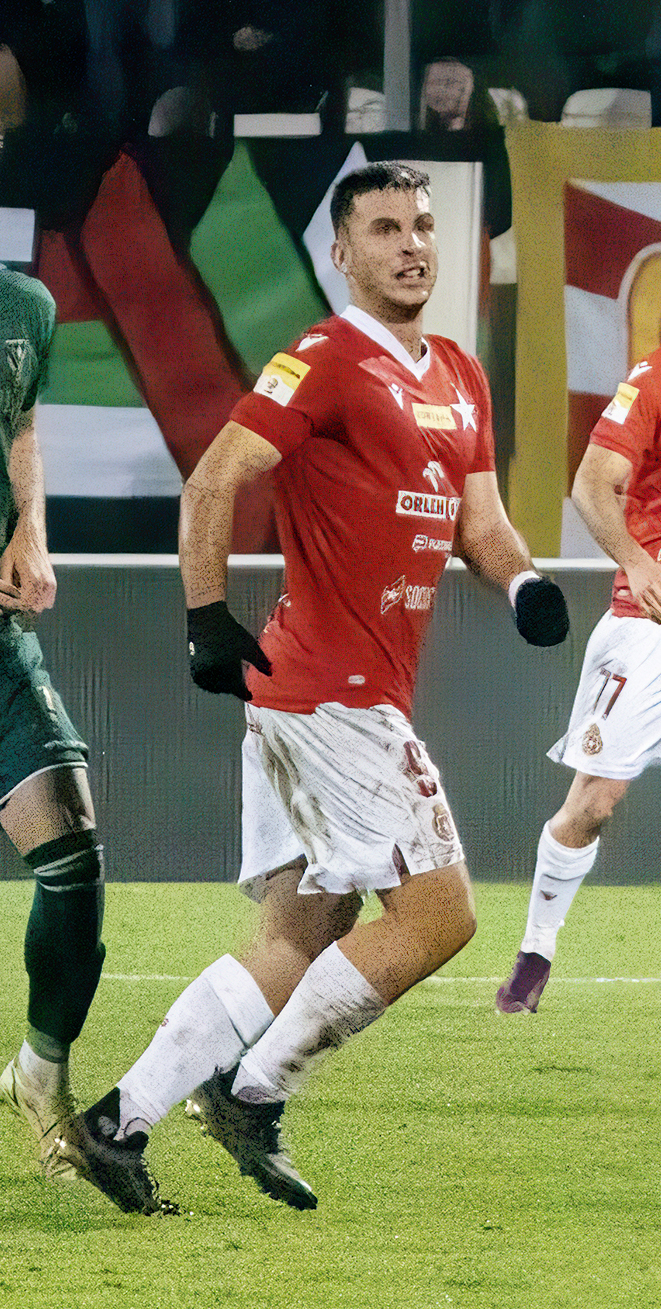
- Rodado in 2022 with Wisła Kraków

Personal information
- Full name: Ángel Rodado Jareño
- Date of birth: 7 March 1997 (age 29)
- Place of birth: Palma, Spain
- Height: 1.79 m (5 ft 10 in)
- Position: Forward

Team information
- Current team: Wisła Kraków
- Number: 9

Youth career
- Mallorca
- 2014–2015: → San Fernando (loan)

Senior career*
Years	Team	Apps	(Gls)
2016–2018	Mallorca B	56	(29)
2018–2022	Ibiza	88	(27)
2021–2022	→ Barcelona B (loan)	24	(7)
2022–	Wisła Kraków	126	(77)
- * Club domestic league appearances and goals as of 11:05, 20 September 2026 (UTC)

Ángel Rodado Jareño (born 7 March 1997) is a Spanish professional footballer who plays as a forward for Polish club Wisła Kraków.

== Club career ==
Born in Palma de Mallorca, Balearic Islands, Rodado was a RCD Mallorca youth graduate. He made his senior debut with the reserves on 21 February 2016, starting in a 2–0 Tercera División away win against CF Sant Rafel, and featured in a further six matches as his side achieved promotion to Segunda División B in the play-offs.

Rodado scored his first senior goal on 4 September 2016, netting the opener in a 2–1 win at Atlético Levante UD. In the 2017–18 campaign, he scored 30 goals for the B's, which included hat-tricks against CE Santanyí (6–0 home win), CE Mercadal (5–0 home win) and UD Poblense (4–3 home win).

On 16 August 2018, Rodado joined neighbouring UD Ibiza in the third division. He featured regularly for the club, and helped in their first-ever promotion to Segunda División in the 2020–21 season.

Rodado made his professional debut on 13 August 2021, coming on as a late substitute for Sergio Castel in a 0–0 away draw against Real Zaragoza. Late in the month, he moved to FC Barcelona on a one-year loan deal, and was assigned to the B-team in Primera División RFEF.

On 20 August 2022, Rodado moved abroad for the first time in his career to join Polish I liga side Wisła Kraków on a three-year deal. On 2 May 2024, he scored the winning goal in extra time of a 2–1 victory over Pogoń Szczecin in the 2023–24 Polish Cup final. With four goals throughout the campaign, he was the best scorer in the competition, along with Korona Kielce's Martin Remacle. With 21 goals in 30 I liga appearances, he also finished the 2023–24 season as the league's top scorer.

In July 2024, Rodado extended his deal with Wisła until June 2027, with an option for a further year upon appearing in at least half of Wisła's league fixtures during the 2026–27 season. A year later, he signed a new five-year contract.

== Career statistics ==
As of match played 18 September 2026

Appearances and goals by club, season and competition
Club	Season	League			National cup (Note: Includes Copa del Rey, Polish Cup)		Europe		Other		Total	
Club	Season	Division	Apps	Goals	Apps	Goals	Apps	Goals	Apps	Goals	Apps	Goals
Mallorca B	2015–16	Tercera Federación	5	0	—		—		—		5	0
Mallorca B	2016–17	Segunda División B	17	1	—		—		—		17	1
Mallorca B	2017–18	Tercera Federación	34	28	2	1	—		—		36	29
Mallorca B	Total		56	29	2	1	—		—		58	30
Ibiza	2018–19	Segunda División B	36	9	0	0	—		—		36	9
Ibiza	2019–20	Segunda División B	28	13	3	1	—		1 (Note: Appearance(s) in Segunda División promotion play-offs)	0	32	14
Ibiza	2020–21	Segunda División B	22	5	2	1	—		2	0	26	6
Ibiza	2021–22	Segunda División	1	0	0	0	—		—		1	0
Ibiza	2022–23	Segunda División	1	0	0	0	—		—		1	0
Ibiza	Total		88	27	5	2	—		3	0	96	29
Barcelona B (loan)	2021–22	Segunda División B	24	7	—		—		—		24	7
Wisła Kraków	2022–23	I liga	27	8	3	3	—		1 (Note: Appearance in I liga promotion play-offs)	0	31	11
Wisła Kraków	2023–24	I liga	30	21	5	4	—		—		35	25
Wisła Kraków	2024–25	I liga	32	23	2	1	8 (Note: Four appearances and three goals in UEFA Europa League, four appearances and three goals in UEFA Conference League)	6	1	0	43	30
Wisła Kraków	2025–26	I liga	26	21	2	1	—		—		28	22
Wisła Kraków	2026–27	Ekstraklasa	9	4	1	0	—		—		10	4
Total			124	77	13	9	8	6	2	0	147	92
Career total			292	140	20	12	8	6	5	0	325	158

== Honours ==
Wisła Kraków

- I liga: 2025–26
- Polish Cup: 2023–24

Individual

- I liga top scorer: 2023–24, 2024–25, 2025–26
- Polish Cup top scorer: 2023–24
- I liga Player of the Year: 2024, 2025
- I liga Player of the Season: 2024–25, 2025–26
- I liga Foreigner of the Season: 2025–26
- Ekstraklasa Player of the Month: September 2026
- I liga Player of the Month: July & August 2024, July & August 2025, October 2025
- Polish Union of Footballers' I liga Player of the Season: 2023–24
- Polish Union of Footballers' I liga Team of the Season: 2023–24
