= Álex Mula =

Spanish footballer (born 1996)

Personal information
- Full name: Alejandro Miguel Mula Sánchez
- Date of birth: 23 July 1996 (age 30)
- Place of birth: Barcelona, Spain
- Height: 1.78 m (5 ft 10 in)
- Position: Winger

Team information
- Current team: Lincoln Red Imps
- Number: 10

Youth career
- 2003–2010: Espanyol
- 2010–2014: Málaga

Senior career*
Years	Team	Apps	(Gls)
2013–2017	Málaga B	108	(23)
2017–2020	Málaga	22	(0)
2018	→ Tenerife (loan)	16	(5)
2020	→ Alcorcón (loan)	5	(1)
2020–2022	Fuenlabrada	56	(4)
2022	→ Alcorcón (loan)	15	(0)
2023	Wisła Kraków	12	(2)
2023–2024	Lamia	4	(0)
2024	Gimnàstic	16	(0)
2024–2026	Ponferradina	46	(1)
2026–	Lincoln Red Imps	21	(9)

International career
2012	Spain U17	2	(0)
- * Club domestic league appearances and goals as of 22 November 2026

Alejandro Miguel "Álex" Mula Sánchez (born 23 July 1996) is a Spanish professional footballer who plays as a winger for Lincoln Red Imps.

== Career ==
Born in Barcelona, Catalonia, Mula joined Málaga CF's youth setup in 2011, from RCD Espanyol. He made his debut with the reserves on 30 March 2013 at the age of 17, starting in a 1–2 Tercera División home loss against UD San Pedro.

Mula scored his first senior goals on 7 September 2014, netting a hat-trick in a 7–0 home routing of CD Español del Alquián. He subsequently became a regular starter for the B-side in the following seasons, scoring a career-best 11 goals in 2016–17.

After playing regularly with the first team during the 2017 pre-season, Mula was promoted to the main squad by manager Míchel. He made his first team – and La Liga – debut on 26 August of that year, starting in a 0–1 away loss against Girona FC.

On 31 January 2018, Mula was loaned to Segunda División side CD Tenerife for the remainder of the campaign. He scored his first professional goal on 26 February, netting the last in a 3–1 home defeat of CD Lugo.

On 9 March 2018, Mula scored a brace in a 3–1 home win over Real Oviedo. Returning to Málaga (now also in the second division) for 2018–19, he contributed with 11 appearances and was definitely promoted to the main squad in July 2019.

On 8 January 2020, after spending the first half of the 2019–20 campaign unregistered due to Málaga's financial problems, Mula was loaned to fellow second division side AD Alcorcón until June.

On 23 August 2020, Mula agreed to a four-year contract with CF Fuenlabrada, still in division two. On 2 February 2022, he returned to Alkor also in a temporary deal.

On 17 December 2022, he signed a deal until the end of the season with Polish second division side Wisła Kraków. On 28 January 2024, after a short period at Greek side PAS Lamia 1964, he returned to his home country with Gimnàstic de Tarragona in Primera Federación.

On 11 July 2024, Mula moved to another third-tier club, SD Ponferradina.

In January 2026, Mula joined Gibraltar Football League side Lincoln Red Imps. He made his debut on 25 January 2026, against College 1975.
