= Luis Fernández (footballer, born 1993) =

Spanish footballer

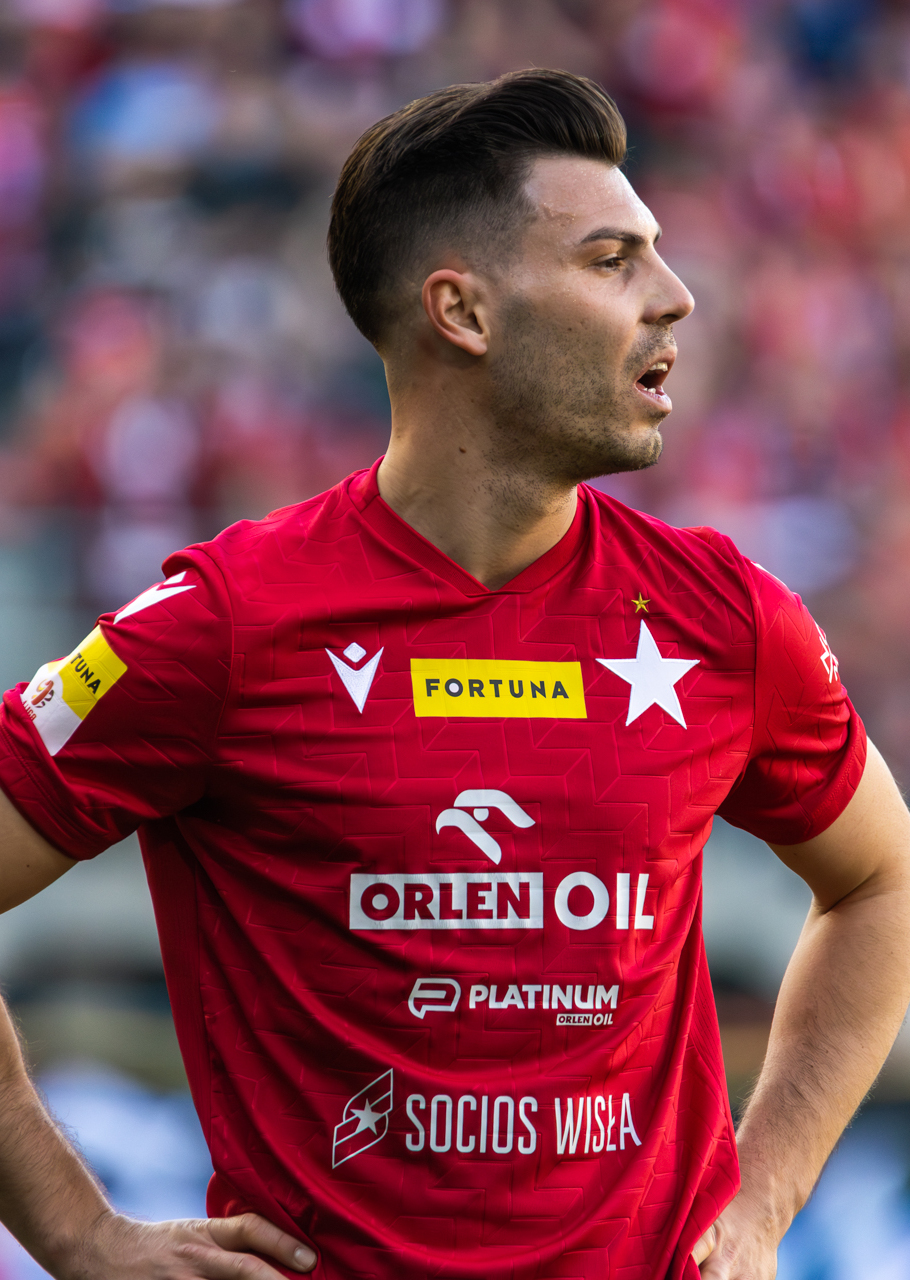
- Fernández with Wisła Kraków in 2023

Personal information
- Full name: Luis Fernández Teijeiro
- Date of birth: 27 September 1993 (age 33)
- Place of birth: Burela, Spain
- Height: 1.75 m (5 ft 9 in)
- Position: Forward

Youth career
- 2008–2009: Ural CF
- 2009–2011: Deportivo

Senior career*
Years	Team	Apps	(Gls)
2011–2013	Deportivo B	47	(31)
2013–2016	Deportivo La Coruña	28	(5)
2014–2015	→ Lugo (loan)	25	(5)
2015–2016	→ Huesca (loan)	28	(4)
2016–2017	Alcorcón	4	(0)
2017	UCAM Murcia	5	(0)
2017–2018	Deportivo B	12	(5)
2018–2019	UCAM Murcia	17	(9)
2019–2021	Asteras Tripolis	45	(17)
2021	Khor Fakkan	2	(0)
2022–2023	Wisła Kraków	39	(23)
2023–2024	Lechia Gdańsk	13	(6)
2025	Arenteiro	12	(0)
Total		277	(105)
- * Club domestic league appearances and goals

Luis Fernández Teijeiro (born 27 September 1993) is a Spanish former professional footballer who played as a forward.

== Club career ==
Born in Burela, Province of Lugo, Fernández was a youth product of neighbouring Deportivo de La Coruña. He made his debut as a senior with the reserves, representing them in the Tercera División and scoring 21 goals in the 2012–13 season.

Fernández made his official debut for the Galicians' first team on 17 August 2013, starting in a 1–0 away win over UD Las Palmas in the Segunda División. He scored his first goal in the competition on 3 November, his team's last in the 2–0 home victory against Real Madrid Castilla.

Fernández scored five goals from 28 appearances in 2013–14, as Depor returned to La Liga at the first attempt. On 18 July 2014, he was loaned to neighbouring second-division club CD Lugo in a season-long deal; still owned by the former, he joined SD Huesca of the same league the following campaign.

On 21 July 2016, Fernández terminated his contract with Deportivo and signed a two-year deal with AD Alcorcón hours later. On 10 January of the following year, he cut ties with the latter and moved to the second tier with UCAM Murcia CF the next day.

After suffering a knee injury, Fernández returned to Deportivo B on 1 September 2017 as a free agent. He re-joined UCAM in July 2018, now on a permanent basis.

On 3 July 2019, Fernández signed a two-year contract with Super League Greece club Asteras Tripolis F.C. for an undisclosed fee. On 7 June 2020, he netted through a free kick in the 2–1 away defeat of Athlitiki Enosi Larissa F.C. in the opening game of the playoffs, after an 80-day enforced COVID-19 break.

Fernández continued competing abroad the following seasons, with Khor Fakkan Club in the UAE Pro League and Wisła Kraków in the Polish Ekstraklasa and the I liga. On 12 July 2023, he joined Lechia Gdańsk also from the country's second tier.

On 22 July 2023, Fernández scored a hat-trick in a 4–2 away win against Chrobry Głogów, twice from penalties. He totalled seven during the season in spite of missing several matches due to a meniscus injury, helping Lechia to claim the championship and subsequently promote.

In late September 2024, a month after an unsuccessful trial with fellow top-flight club Raków Częstochowa, Fernández filed for his contract to be unilaterally terminated. He cited unpaid wages and not being allowed to train with the rest of the squad as the reasons.

Fernández returned to Spain on 2 January 2025, joining Primera Federación side CD Arenteiro. One year later, the 32-year-old announced his retirement.

== Honours ==
Lechia Gdańsk

- I liga: 2023–24

Individual

- I liga Player of the Month: March 2023
