= 2024–25 Wisła Kraków season =

Wisła Kraków
2024–25 season
- Manager: Kazimierz Moskal (until 23 September); Mariusz Jop (caretaker, from 24 September; made permanent on 31 December)
- Stadium: Stadion im. Henryka Reymana
- I liga: 4th
- Polish Cup: Round of 16
- Polish Super Cup: Final
- UEFA Europa League: Second qualifying round
- UEFA Conference League: Play-off round
- Top goalscorer: League: Ángel Rodado (23); All: Ángel Rodado (30)
- Highest home attendance: 33,000 (vs. Miedź Legnica, 29 May 2025; I liga)
- Lowest home attendance: 13,324 (vs. Warta Poznań, 9 April 2025; I liga)
- Average home league attendance: 18,419
- Biggest win: Wisła Kraków 5–0 Odra Opole; Ruch Chorzów 0–5 Wisła Kraków
- Biggest defeat: Rapid Wien 6–1 Wisła Kraków; Wisła Kraków 1–6 Cercle Brugge
Home colours	Away colours	Third colours
- All statistics correct as of 9 May 2025.

The 2024–25 Wisła Kraków season was the 119th season in the history of Wisła Kraków, and the club's third consecutive season in I liga (10th in total). It was also the 72nd season in the Polish Cup. In addition to the domestic league and cup, the team participated in the Polish Super Cup, the UEFA Europa League, and subsequently, the UEFA Conference League.

== Transfers ==
=== In ===
Pos.	Player	Transferred from	Fee	Date	Source
MF	(Poland) Olivier Sukiennicki	(Poland) Stal Stalowa Wola	€50,000	1 July 2024	
DF	(Poland) Rafał Mikulec	(Poland) Resovia Rzeszów	€12,000	1 July 2024	
DF	(Greece) Giannis Kiakos	(Greece) PAS Giannina	Free	2 July 2024	
FW	(Poland) Łukasz Zwoliński	(Poland) Raków Częstochowa	€100,000	15 July 2024	
DF	(Poland) Wiktor Biedrzycki	(Poland) Bruk-Bet Termalica Nieciecza	Undisclosed	20 July 2024	
FW	(Hungary) Tamás Kiss	(Hungary) Újpest	Free	23 July 2024	
MF	(Portugal) Frederico Duarte	(Greece) Panetolikos	Free	24 July 2024	
MF	(Nigeria) James Igbekeme	(Spain) Ponferradina	Free	20 August 2024	
MF	(Serbia) Marko Poletanović	(Serbia) Vojvodina	€50,000	10 February 2025	

=== Out ===
Pos.	Player	Transferred to	Fee	Date	Source
MF	(Albania) Vullnet Basha	Retired	End of contract	1 July 2024	
FW	(Poland) Michał Żyro	Retired	End of contract	1 July 2024	
FW	(Algeria) Billel Omrani	(Romania) Politehnica Iași	End of contract	1 July 2024	
MF	(Spain) Miki Villar	(Poland) Jagiellonia Białystok	End of contract	1 July 2024	
FW	(Poland) Szymon Sobczak	(Poland) Arka Gdynia	End of contract	1 July 2024	
GK	(Spain) Álvaro Ratón	(Greece) PAS Lamia 1964	Free	4 July 2024	
DF	(Spain) Eneko Satrústegui	(Spain) Cultural y Deportiva Leonesa	Free	24 July 2024	
MF	(Spain) Joan Román	(Poland) Wieczysta Kraków	€200,000	25 July 2024	
FW	(Albania) Dejvi Bregu	(Albania) Dinamo City	Free	7 August 2024	
MF	(Poland) Jakub Krzyżanowski	(Italy) Torino Primavera	Loan	7 August 2024	
GK	(Poland) Mikołaj Biegański	(Poland) Widzew Łódź	Free	8 August 2024	
DF	(Spain) David Juncà	(Andorra) Inter Club d'Escaldes	Free	28 August 2024	
MF	(Poland) Dawid Olejarka	(Poland) Znicz Pruszków	Loan	6 September 2024	
MF	(Poland) Igor Sapała	Released	Released	8 November 2024	
FW	(Poland) Mateusz Młyński	(Poland) Polonia Warsaw	Released	8 January 2025	
DF	(Poland) Kuba Wiśniewski	(Poland) Wieczysta Kraków	Loan	23 January 2025	

== Friendlies ==
=== Pre-season ===
28 June 2024 Friendly	Wisła Kraków	0–1	Puszcza Niepołomice	Wola Chorzelowska
10:30		Report	Barauskas 78'	Stadium: Hotel Rado; Attendance: 0 Referee: Marcin Konefał (Mielec)

4 July 2024 Friendly	Wisła Kraków	3–0	Hutnik Kraków	Myślenice
11:00	Gogół 18'; Rodado 32'; Jaroch 33'; Młyński (penalty missed)	Report		Stadium: Sport Myślenice; Attendance: 0 Referee: Patryk Świerczek (Brzesko)

=== Mid-season ===
17 January 2025 Friendly	Wisła Kraków	1–2	Podbeskidzie Bielsko-Biała	Myślenice
12:00 UTC+1	Zwoliński 20'	Report	Klisiewicz 23', 27'; Willmann (yellow card); Mršić (yellow card)	Stadium: Sport Myślenice; Referee: Maciej Górski (Kraków)

22 January 2025 Friendly	Zorya Luhansk (Ukraine)	1–2	Wisła Kraków	Kadriye, Turkey
13:00 UTC+1	Bilotserkovets 11'; Husyev (yellow card); Nwaeze (yellow card)	Report	Rodado 38' (pen.); Zwoliński 49'; Igbekeme (yellow card); Baena (yellow card)	Stadium: Megasaray Football Center; Referee: Łukasz Kuźma (Białystok)

25 January 2025 Friendly	KF Dukagjini (Kosovo)	1–4	Wisła Kraków	Kadriye, Turkey
11:30 UTC+1	Mërlaku 11'	Report	Zwoliński 14', 25'; Jaroch 19'; Kiss 45'; Fazlagikj (yellow card)	Stadium: Megasaray Football Center

29 January 2025 Friendly	KF Llapi (Kosovo)	0–4	Wisła Kraków	Kadriye, Turkey
--:-- UTC+1		Report	Zwoliński; Duarte; Kuziemka	Stadium: Megasaray Football Center
Note: Game played for 45 minutes in the first half and for 60 minutes in the second half.

1 February 2025 Friendly	Obolon Kyiv (Ukraine)	3–2	Wisła Kraków	Kadriye, Turkey
8:30 UTC+1	Bychek 4'; Hrusha 38'; Bliznichenko 85'; Sukhanov (yellow card)	Report	Duda 16', (yellow card); Duarte 89' (pen.)	Stadium: Megasaray Football Center

8 February 2025 Friendly	Wisła Kraków	3–1	Hutnik Kraków	Myślenice
12:00 UTC+1	Zwoliński 5'; Szot 59'; Duda 90'	Report	Głogowski 76' (pen.); Jania (yellow card)	Stadium: Sport Myślenice

=== On-season (spring) ===
21 March 2025 Friendly	Wisła Kraków	1–1	(Czech Republic) Baník Ostrava	Kraków
12:00 UTC+1	Rodado 81'	Report	Látal 32'	Stadium: Stadion im. Henryka Reymana; Attendance: behind closed doors

== Competitions ==
=== Overall record ===
Competition	First match	Last match	Starting round	Final position	Record							
Competition	First match	Last match	Starting round	Final position	Pld	W	D	L	GF	GA	GD	Win %
I liga	28 July 2024	25 May 2025	Matchday 1	4th	35	18	8	9	63	33	+30	51.43
Polish Cup	12 October 2024	3 December 2024	Second round	Round of 16	2	1	0	1	5	5	+0	50.00
Polish Super Cup	2 April 2025		Final	Runner-up	1	0	0	1	0	1	−1	0.00
UEFA Europa League	11 July 2024	1 August 2024	First qualifying round	Second qualifying round	4	2	0	2	6	9	−3	50.00
UEFA Conference League	8 August 2024	29 August 2024	Third qualifying round	Play-off round	4	2	0	2	9	11	−2	50.00
Total					46	23	8	15	83	59	+24	50.00

Last updated: complete
Source: Soccerway

=== I liga ===
==== League table ====
Pos	Team	Pld	W	D	L	GF	GA	GD	Pts	Promotion or Relegation
2	Bruk-Bet Termalica Nieciecza (P)	34	21	8	5	70	39	+31	71	Promotion to Ekstraklasa
3	Wisła Płock (O, P)	34	18	10	6	58	38	+20	64	Qualification for the promotion play-offs
4	Wisła Kraków	34	18	8	8	63	32	+31	62	Qualification for the promotion play-offs
5	Miedź Legnica	34	16	8	10	56	45	+11	56 (Note: Ranked based on goal difference: Miedź Legnica +11, Polonia Warsaw +9.)	Qualification for the promotion play-offs
6	Polonia Warsaw	34	16	8	10	46	37	+9	56	Qualification for the promotion play-offs

Source: 1liga.org, 90minut.pl
Rules for classification: 1) Points; 2) Head-to-head points; 3) Head-to-head goal difference; 4) Goal difference; 6) Goals scored; 7) Number of wins; 8) Number of away wins.
(Note: Head-to-head record is used only after all the matches between the teams in question have been played)
(O) Play-off winner; (P) Promoted
Notes:

Semi-finals; 29 May 2025
3	Wisła Płock	2
6	Polonia Warsaw	1
4	Wisła Kraków	0
5	Miedź Legnica	1

Final; 1 June 2025
3	Wisła Płock	2
5	Miedź Legnica	0

==== Results summary ====
Overall								Home						Away					
Pld	W	D	L	GF	GA	GD	Pts	W	D	L	GF	GA	GD	W	D	L	GF	GA	GD
34	18	8	8	63	32	+31	62	9	5	3	28	13	+15	9	3	5	35	19	+16

Last updated: 25 May 2025.
Source: 90minut.pl

==== Results by round ====
Round	1	2	3	4	5	6	7	8	9	10	11	12	13	14	15	16	17	18	19	20	21	22	23	24	25	26	27	28	29	30	31	32	33	34
Ground	A	H	A	H	H	A	H	A	H	A	H	A	H	A	H	A	H	H	A	H	A	A	H	A	H	A	H	A	H	A	H	A	H	A
Result	L	D	L	W	D	L	D	D	L	W	W	W	W	W	D	W	D	W	L	L	W	D	W	L	W	W	W	W	W	D	L	W	W	W
Position	16	15	14	12	11	13	13	13	16	12	10	9	9	7	8	6	6	5	7	7	6	7	5	6	6	6	6	6	5	5	5	5	4	4

Updated to match(es) played on 25 May 2025. Source: 90minut.pl
A = Away; H = Home; W = Win; D = Draw; L = Loss

==== Matches ====
28 July 2024 2	Wisła Kraków	0–0	Polonia Warsaw	Kraków
14:30 UTC+2	Jaroch (yellow card) 28'; Mikulec (yellow card) 55'; Biedrzycki (red card) 57'	Report	Hoxhallari (yellow card) 18'; Zjawiński (yellow card) 32'; Bajdur (yellow card) 39'; Poczobut (yellow card) 43'; Koton (yellow card) 65'; Kołodziejski (yellow card) 90+4'	Stadium: Stadion im. Henryka Reymana; Attendance: 16,118; Referee: Tomasz Wajda (Żywiec)

4 August 2024 3	Znicz Pruszków	2–1	Wisła Kraków	Pruszków
14:30 UTC+2	Ciepiela (yellow card) 57'; Wiech 76'; Koprowski (yellow card) 89'; Stanclik 90+4' (pen.); Misztal (yellow card) 90+8'	Report	Rodado 18', (yellow card) 45+1'; Kiss (yellow card) 66' (yellow-red card) 73'; Kiakos (yellow card) 75'; Uryga (yellow card) 90+2'; Jaroch (yellow card) 90+2'	Stadium: Stadion Znicza Pruszków; Attendance: 1,423; Referee: Damian Kos (Gdańsk)

12 August 2024 4	Wisła Kraków	3–1	Ruch Chorzów	Kraków
19:00 UTC+2	Biedrzycki (yellow card) 42'; Rodado 45+2', 75' (pen.); Mikulec (yellow card) 78'; Zwoliński (yellow card) 90+6'; Sukiennicki 90+10'	Report	Ventúra (yellow card) 39'; Starzyński (red card) 50'; Szymański 57'; Konczkowski (yellow card) 71'	Stadium: Stadion im. Henryka Reymana; Attendance: 22,217; Referee: Jarosław Przybył (Kluczbork)

19 August 2024 5	Wisła Kraków	2–2	Arka Gdynia	Kraków
19:00 UTC+2	Rodado 13', 49'; Biedrzycki (yellow card) 62' (yellow-red card) 69'; Starzyński (yellow card) 89'	Report	Vitalucci (yellow card) 30'; Oliveira 53', 84'; Dobrotka (yellow card) 74'; Rzuchowski (yellow card) 87'; Hermoso (yellow card) 90+1'	Stadium: Stadion im. Henryka Reymana; Attendance: 14,070; Referee: Sebastian Jarzębak (Bytom)

1 September 2024 8	Kotwica Kołobrzeg	1–1	Wisła Kraków	Kołobrzeg
14:30 UTC+2	Kozajda 14'; Jonathan (yellow card) 39'; Polak (yellow card) 57'	Report	Igbekeme (yellow card) 61'; Rodado 83'; Sukiennicki (yellow card) 88'; Uryga (yellow card) 90+6'	Stadium: Stadion Miejski; Attendance: 2,800; Referee: Grzegorz Kawalko (Olsztyn)

13 September 2024 9	Wisła Kraków	0–1	Warta Poznań	Kraków
20:30 UTC+2	Mikulec (yellow card) 74'; Rodado (yellow card) 84'	Report	Tkachuk (yellow card) 11'; Michalski 45+5' (pen.), (yellow card) 62'; Grobelny (yellow card) 65'; Firlej (yellow card) 79'	Stadium: Stadion im. Henryka Reymana; Attendance: 15,017; Referee: Jacek Małyszek (Lublin)

17 September 2024 1	ŁKS Łódź	3–1	Wisła Kraków	Łódź
19:30 UTC+2	Arasa 10'; Feiertag 28'; Głowacki (yellow card) 32'; Arasa (yellow card) 44'; Mokrzycki 71'	Report	Sukiennicki (yellow card) 69'; Łasicki (yellow card) 89'; Uryga 90', (yellow card) 90+5'	Stadium: Stadion Miejski im. Władysława Króla; Attendance: 8,328; Referee: Wojciech Myć (Lublin)
Note: The match was scheduled for 21 July, but was postponed due to Wisła Krakow's participation in the Europa League.

27 September 2024 11	Wisła Kraków	5–0	Odra Opole	Kraków
20:30 UTC+2	Alfaro (yellow card) 30', (goal) 49'; Kiss 53'; Rodado 59'; Zwoliński 69', 90+3'; Carbó (yellow card) 84'	Report		Stadium: Stadion im. Henryka Reymana; Attendance: 13,352; Referee: Daniel Stefański (Bydgoszcz)

5 October 2024 12	Pogoń Siedlce	1–3	Wisła Kraków	Siedlce
19:35 UTC+2	Hrnčiar (penalty missed) 7'; Podliński 7', (yellow card) 29'; Szuprytowski (yellow card) 53'; Krzyżak (yellow card) 76'	Report	Kiss (yellow card) 2'; Mikulec 26', 52'; Rodado 59'; Carbó (yellow card) 76'; Biedrzycki (yellow card) 80'; Łasicki (yellow card) 90+1'	Stadium: Stadion ROSRRiT; Attendance: 2,566; Referee: Marcin Kochanek (Opole)

18 October 2024 13	Wisła Kraków	2–0	Bruk-Bet Termalica Nieciecza	Kraków
20:30 UTC+2	Zwoliński 78', 90+3'; Łasicki (yellow card) 90+6'	Report	Putivtsev (yellow card) 64'	Stadium: Stadion im. Henryka Reymana; Attendance: 22,130; Referee: Karol Arys (Szczecin)

22 October 2024 6	Górnik Łęczna	1–0	Wisła Kraków	Łęczna
18:00 UTC+2	Bednarczyk 51'; Żyra (yellow card) 55'; Banaszak (yellow card) 90+10'	Report	Jaroch (yellow card) 25'; Mikulec (yellow card) 41'; Uryga (yellow card) 90+9'	Stadium: Stadion Górnika Łęczna; Attendance: 2,027; Referee: Piotr Urban (Warsaw)
Note: The match was scheduled for 22 August, but was postponed due to Wisła Krakow's participation in the Conference League.

27 October 2024 14	Wisła Płock	1−3	Wisła Kraków	Płock
14:30 UTC+2	Hiszpański (yellow card) 5'; Pomorski (yellow card) 35'; Sekulski (yellow card) 37'; Edmundsson (yellow card) 42'; Salvador (yellow card) 90+7'; Krawczyk 90+7'	Report	Rodado 41', 49'; Igbekeme (yellow card) 45+3' (yellow-red card) 72'; Sukiennicki (yellow card) 59'; Jaroch (yellow card) 78'; Kiss 82'	Stadium: Orlen Stadion im. Kazimierza Górskiego; Attendance: 8,321; Referee: Tomasz Kwiatkowski (Warsaw)

4 November 2024 15	Wisła Kraków	0−0	GKS Tychy	Kraków
19:00 UTC+1	Kutwa (yellow card) 90+1'	Report	Keiblinger (yellow card) 68'; Ertlthaler (yellow card) 85'; Budnicki (yellow card) 90+3'	Stadium: Stadion im. Henryka Reymana; Attendance: 16,161; Referee: Piotr Rzucidło (Warsaw)

10 November 2024 16	Stal Stalowa Wola	1–5	Wisła Kraków	Stalowa Wola
12:45 UTC+2	Furtak 22'; Urban (yellow card) 54'; Wojtkowski (yellow card) 54'; Ruszel (yellow card) 89'	Report	Baena 16'; Sukiennicki (yellow card) 28', (goal) 40'; Wilk 39' (o.g.); Kiss (yellow card) 42'; Alfaro 56'; Uryga (yellow card) 71'; Zwoliński (yellow card) 76', (goal) 84'	Stadium: Podkarpackie Centrum Piłki Nożnej; Attendance: 3,764; Referee: Piotr Urban (Warsaw)

16 November 2024 10	Chrobry Głogów	0–3	Wisła Kraków	Głogów
17:30 UTC+2		Report	Rodado 4', 7'; Kiakos 83'	Stadium: Stadion Chrobrego Głogów; Attendance: 1,186; Referee: Karol Arys (Szczecin)
Note: The match was scheduled for 22 September, but was postponed due to the ongoing floods in Poland.

22 November 2024 17	Wisła Kraków	1−1	Stal Rzeszów	Kraków
20:30 UTC+1	Zwoliński 33'	Report	Łyczko 14', (yellow card) 58'; Bała (yellow card) 49'	Stadium: Stadion im. Henryka Reymana; Attendance: 16,768; Referee: Damian Sylwestrzak (Wrocław)

30 November 2024 18	Wisła Kraków	2−1	ŁKS Łódź	Kraków
19:35 UTC+1	Zwoliński 61', 90'	Report	Gülen 11'; Wiech (yellow card) 22'; Kupczak (yellow card) 49'; Mokrzycki (yellow card) 67'	Stadium: Stadion im. Henryka Reymana; Attendance: 17,383; Referee: Jarosław Przybył (Kluczbork)

6 December 2024 19	Polonia Warsaw	2−0	Wisła Kraków	Warsaw
20:30 UTC+1	Terpiłowski (yellow card) 4'; Zjawiński (yellow card) 19', (goal) 39'; Kołodziejski 25'; Durmuş (yellow card) 29'; Hoxhallari (yellow card) 48'; Kuchta (yellow card) 50'; Olszewski (yellow card) 71'	Report	Łasicki (yellow card) 76'; Letkiewicz (yellow card) 85'; Uryga (yellow card) 85'; Mikulec (yellow card) 90'; Sukiennicki (yellow card) 90+2'	Stadium: Stadion Miejski im. gen. Kazimierza Sosnkowskiego; Attendance: 2,542; Referee: Mateusz Piszczelok (Katowice)

12 December 2024 7	Wisła Kraków	1–1	Miedź Legnica	Kraków
21:00 UTC+1	Uryga (yellow card) 27'; Rodado 57'	Report	Kovačević (yellow card) 7'; Podgórski (yellow card) 16'; Drygas (yellow card) 31'; Michalik (yellow card) 50'; Antonik 54'; Kaczmarski (yellow card) 87'	Stadium: Stadion im. Henryka Reymana; Attendance: 12,301; Referee: Marcin Kochanek (Opole)
Note: The match was scheduled for 25 August, but was postponed due to Wisła Krakow's participation in the Conference League.

15 February 2025 20	Wisła Kraków	0–1	Znicz Pruszków	Kraków
17:00 UTC+1	Sukiennicki (yellow card) 85'; Uryga (yellow card) 86'	Report	Moskwik 27'; Okhronchuk (yellow card) 58'; Góra (yellow card) 82'	Stadium: Stadion im. Henryka Reymana; Attendance: 15,115; Referee: Mateusz Piszczelok (Katowice)

22 February 2025 21	Ruch Chorzów	0–5	Wisła Kraków	Chorzów
14:30 UTC+1		Report	Kutwa 4'; Biedrzycki (yellow card) 17'; Rodado 21', 56', 60'; Baena 45+4'; Poletanović (yellow card) 62'	Stadium: Stadion Śląski; Attendance: 53,293; Referee: Szymon Marciniak (Płock)

28 February 2025 22	Arka Gdynia	2−2	Wisła Kraków	Gdynia
20:30 UTC+1	Sobczak 8'; Kocaba (yellow card) 43'; Petrović (yellow card) 45+1'; Marcjanik (yellow card) 52'; Azatskyi 53'; Navarro (yellow card) 65'; Węglarz (yellow card) 68'; Majchrzak (yellow card) 70'; Gaprindashvili (yellow card) 90+9'	Report	Rodado 28'; Mikulec (yellow card) 68'; Sukiennicki (yellow card) 90+3'; Duarte 90+5'	Stadium: Stadion Miejski; Attendance: 8,015; Referee: Paweł Raczkowski (Warsaw)

9 March 2025 23	Wisła Kraków	1−0	Górnik Łęczna	Kraków
14:30 UTC+1	Letkiewicz (red card) 60'; Biedrzycki 75', (yellow card) 90+6'	Report	Żyra (yellow card) 76'	Stadium: Stadion im. Henryka Reymana; Attendance: 25,000; Referee: Piotr Urban (Warsaw)

14 March 2025 24	Miedź Legnica	2–1	Wisła Kraków	Legnica
18:00 UTC+1	Antonik 20'; Letniowski 82', (yellow card) 85'	Report	Duda 14', (yellow card) 90'	Stadium: Stadion Miejski im. Orła Białego; Attendance: 3,864; Referee: Karol Arys (Szczecin)

28 March 2025 25	Wisła Kraków	2−1	Kotwica Kołobrzeg	Kraków
20:30 UTC+1	Uryga 55'; Rodado 65' (pen.); Sukiennicki (yellow card) 74'	Report	Favorov 51' (pen.), (red card) 90+3'; Musolitin (yellow card) 56'	Stadium: Stadion im. Henryka Reymana; Attendance: 18,922; Referee: Jacek Małyszek (Lublin)

5 April 2025 26	Warta Poznań	0–1	Wisła Kraków	Grodzisk Wielkopolski
19:30 UTC+2	Kiełb (yellow card) 16'	Report	Mikulec 57'; Jaroch (yellow card) 90+2'; Łasicki (yellow card) 90+3'	Stadium: Stadion Dyskobolii Grodzisk Wielkopolski; Attendance: 660; Referee: Damian Kos (Gdańsk)

9 April 2025 27	Wisła Kraków	2–1	Chrobry Głogów	Kraków
18:00 UTC+2	Baena 24'; Mikulec (yellow card) 54'; Rodado 61'; Duda (yellow card) 88'; Jaroch (yellow card) 90+4'	Report	Bartlewicz 6'; Lenarcik (yellow card) 17'; Mandrysz (yellow card) 28'; Tabiś (yellow card) 51'	Stadium: Stadion im. Henryka Reymana; Attendance: 13,324; Referee: Piotr Rzucidło (Warsaw)

13 April 2025 28	Odra Opole	1−2	Wisła Kraków	Opole
14:30 UTC+2	Přikryl (yellow card) 38'; Szrek (yellow card) 41'; Żemło (yellow card) 48'; Letkiewicz 48' (o.g.); Czapliński (yellow card) 62'	Report	Rodado (yellow card) 28', (goal) 44'; Mikulec 42', (yellow card) 90'	Stadium: Stadion Miejski Odra; Attendance: 9,022; Referee: Mateusz Piszczelok (Katowice)

19 April 2025 29	Wisła Kraków	1–0	Pogoń Siedlce	Kraków
17:15 UTC+2	Duarte 41'; Kiakos (yellow card) 41'; Baena (yellow card) 54'; Igbekeme (yellow card) 89'	Report	Miś (yellow card) 46'; Jakubik (yellow card) 52'; Dzięcioł (yellow card) 90+5'	Stadium: Stadion im. Henryka Reymana; Attendance: 20,656; Referee: Tomasz Wajda (Żywiec)

25 April 2025 30	Bruk-Bet Termalica Nieciecza	2–2	Wisła Kraków	Nieciecza
20:30 UTC+2	Ambrosiewicz 29'; Zapolnik 58'; Wolski (yellow card) 73'; Trubeha (yellow card) 87'	Report	Poletanović (yellow card) 6'; Rodado 34'; Alfaro (yellow card) 40'; Jaroch 74'; Uryga (yellow card) 82'; Duda (yellow card) 90+3'	Stadium: Stadion Sportowy Bruk-Bet Termalica; Attendance: 4,595; Referee: Grzegorz Kawałko (Olsztyn)

2 May 2025 31	Wisła Kraków	1–3	Wisła Płock	Kraków
20:30 UTC+2	Rodado 13' (pen.); Mikulec (yellow card) 40'	Report	Kuchko 14', 90+5'; Sekulski 38', (yellow card) 76'; Nastić (yellow card) 47'; Edmundsson (yellow card) 50'	Stadium: Stadion im. Henryka Reymana; Attendance: 30,275; Referee: Tomasz Kwiatkowski (Warsaw)

9 May 2025 32	GKS Tychy	0–2	Wisła Kraków	Tychy
20:30 UTC+2	Keiblinger (yellow card) 58'; Bieroński (yellow card) 67'	Report	Rodado 66'; Uryga 73'; Poletanović (yellow card) 88'; Carbó (yellow card) 90+3'	Stadium: Stadion Miejski; Attendance: 7,694; Referee: Bartosz Frankowski (Toruń)

16 May 2025 33	Wisła Kraków	5–0	Stal Stalowa Wola	Kraków
20:30 UTC+2	Mikulec 12'; Niepsuj 34' (o.g.); Łasicki (yellow card) 51'; Colley (yellow card) 59'; Poletanović (yellow card) 60'; Zwoliński 72'; Duda (yellow card) 79'; Alfaro 81'; Carbó (yellow card) 85'; Kiss 88'; Rodado (yellow card) 89'	Report	Mehremić (yellow card) 28' (yellow-red card) 45+2'; Walski (yellow card) 71'	Stadium: Stadion im. Henryka Reymana; Attendance: 24,314; Referee: Marcin Kochanek (Opole)

25 May 2025 34	Stal Rzeszów	0–3	Wisła Kraków	Rzeszów
17:30 UTC+2	Kucharski (yellow card) 22'; Prokić (yellow card) 28'	Report	Duarte 12', 72'; Zwoliński 36'; Colley (yellow card) 75'	Stadium: Stadion Miejski Stal; Attendance: 5,478; Referee: Piotr Urban (Warsaw)

Promotion play-offs

29 May 2025 Semi-final	Wisła Kraków	0–1	Miedź Legnica	Kraków
21:00 UTC+2	Duarte (yellow card) 86'	Report	Kwiecień (yellow card) 21'; Kostka 36'; Walczak (yellow card) 76'; Grudziński (yellow card) 90+7'; Podgórski (yellow card) 90+10'; Wrąbel (yellow card) 90+15'	Stadium: Stadion im. Henryka Reymana; Attendance: 33,000; Referee: Bartosz Frankowski (Toruń)
Note: The game was interrupted in the 49th minute for 14 minutes due to a player's injury.

=== Polish Cup ===
12 October 2024 Round 2	Siarka Tarnobrzeg	2−3	Wisła Kraków	Tarnobrzeg
14:15 UTC+2	D. Lisowski (yellow card) 1', (goal) 49'; Jodłowski (yellow card) 5'; Czajkowski (yellow card) 40'; Ogorzały (yellow card) 57'; Iwao 68'; P. Lisowski (yellow card) 80'	Report	Biedrzycki (yellow card) 13' (yellow-red card) 71'; Rodado 37'; Zwoliński 47', (yellow card) 54'; Carbó (yellow card) 83'; Uryga 89'	Stadium: Stadion Miejski; Attendance: 2,680; Referee: Piotr Szypuła (Bielsko-Biała)

3 December 2024 Round of 16	Polonia Warsaw	3–2 (a.e.t.)	Wisła Kraków	Warsaw
21:00 UTC+1	Kołodziejski (yellow card) 17'; Durmuş 55', 56'; Koton (yellow card) 83'; Olszewski (yellow card) 92'; Poczobut (yellow card) 105+2', (goal) 108'; Kuchta (yellow card) 116'	Report	Duarte 6', 39'; Łasicki (yellow card) 68'; Mikulec (yellow card) 81'; Igbekeme (yellow card) 102'; Rodado (penalty missed) 105'	Stadium: Stadion Miejski im. gen. Kazimierza Sosnkowskiego; Attendance: 2,244; Referee: Marcin Szczerbowicz (Olsztyn)

=== Polish Super Cup ===
2 April 2025 Final	Jagiellonia Białystok	1–0	Wisła Kraków	Warsaw
21:00 UTC+2	Villar 14'; Ebosse (yellow card) 36'; Imaz (yellow card) 76'; Diaby-Fadiga (yellow card) 90'	Report	Duarte (yellow card) 76'	Stadium: Stadion Narodowy; Attendance: 10,935; Referee: Jarosław Przybył (Kluczbork)

=== UEFA Europa League ===
==== First qualifying round ====
11 July 2024 First leg	Wisła Kraków (Poland)	2–0	(Kosovo) Llapi	Kraków, Poland
20:30 UTC+2	Sapała 2'; Jaroch (yellow card) 62'; Sukiennicki (yellow card) 80'; Rodado 90+5'	Report	Ramadani (yellow card) 35'; Namani (yellow card) 71'; Musolli (yellow card) 83'; Useini (yellow card) 90+6'	Stadium: Stadion im. Henryka Reymana; Attendance: 24,403; Referee: Marc Nagtegaal (Netherlands)

18 July 2024 Second leg	Llapi (Kosovo)	1–2 (1–4 agg.)	(Poland) Wisła Kraków	Podujevo, Kosovo
16:30 UTC+2	Blakçori (yellow card) 12'; Gashijani (yellow card) 23'; Krasniqi (yellow card) 51'; Tahiri 74'	Report	Rodado 58'; Uryga (yellow card) 78'; Kiakos 90'	Stadium: Stadiumi Zahir Pajaziti; Attendance: 0 (Note: The Llapi v Wisła Kraków match was played behind closed doors due to a punishment by UEFA to Llapi for racist behaviour of fans and pitch invasion during a match against Budućnost Podgorica in the 2022–23 UEFA Europa Conference League qualifying phase.); Referee: Trustin Farrugia Cann (Malta)

==== Second qualifying round ====
25 July 2024 First leg	Wisła Kraków (Poland)	1–2	(Austria) Rapid Wien	Kraków, Poland
18:00 UTC+2	Carbó 79'	Report	Jansson 36'; Bolla (red card) 45+6'; Seidl 53'; Grgic (yellow card) 73'	Stadium: Stadion im. Henryka Reymana; Attendance: 30,542; Referee: Mohammad Al-Emara (Finland)

1 August 2024 Second leg	Rapid Wien (Austria)	6–1 (8–2 agg.)	(Poland) Wisła Kraków	Vienna, Austria
20:30 UTC+2	Burgstaller 6', 30', 35'; Drena Beljo 24'; Sangaré (penalty missed) 41'; Raux-Yao 45'; Jansson (yellow card) 56'; Lang 78'	Report	Rodado 80'	Stadium: Allianz Stadion; Attendance: 19,600; Referee: John Brooks (England)

=== UEFA Conference League ===
==== Third qualifying round ====
8 August 2024 First leg	Spartak Trnava (Slovakia)	3–1	(Poland) Wisła Kraków	Trnava, Slovakia
20:30 UTC+2	Bainović (yellow card) 14'; Ďuriš 47', 68'; Azango 60'	Report	Rodado 26'; Sukiennicki (yellow card) 42'	Stadium: Štadión Antona Malatinského; Attendance: 13,010; Referee: Sayat Karabayev (Kazakhstan)

15 August 2024 Second leg	Wisła Kraków (Poland)	3–1 (a.e.t.) (4–4 agg.) (12–11 p)	(Slovakia) Spartak Trnava	Kraków, Poland
20:30 UTC+2	Kiakos (yellow card) 5'; Rodado 43' (pen.); Starzyński 60'; Jaroch (yellow card) 69'; Uryga 98'	Report	Sabo (yellow card) 1'; Ďuriš (yellow card) 45+1', (goal) 107'; Kubista (yellow card) 90+5'; Paur (yellow card) 100'; Frelih (yellow card) 120'	Stadium: Stadion im. Henryka Reymana; Attendance: 15,099; Referee: Don Robertson (Scotland)
	Penalties
	Uryga (penalty scored); Biedrzycki (penalty missed); Jaroch (penalty missed); Rodado (penalty scored); Carbó (penalty scored); Mikulec (penalty scored); Duarte (penalty scored); Gogół (penalty scored); Baena (penalty scored); Kutwa (penalty scored); Broda (penalty scored); Uryga (penalty scored); Biedrzycki (penalty scored); Jaroch (penalty scored)		(penalty missed) Ďuriš; (penalty scored) Paur; (penalty scored) Kratochvíl; (penalty scored) Kóša; (penalty missed) Bainović; (penalty scored) Kubista; (penalty scored) Corryn; (penalty scored) Ahl; (penalty scored) Holík; (penalty scored) Azango; (penalty scored) Frelih; (penalty scored) Paur; (penalty scored) Kratochvíl; (penalty missed) Kóša

==== Play-off round ====
22 August 2024 First leg	Wisła Kraków (Poland)	1–6	(Belgium) Cercle Brugge	Kraków, Poland
20:30 UTC+2	Rodado (yellow card) 43', (goal) 85'; Jaroch (yellow card) 44'	Report	Minda 8'; Somers 10'; Ravych 36'; Denkey (yellow card) 39', (goal) 47'; Ouattara 56'; Agyekum (yellow card) 74'; Olaigbe 83'	Stadium: Stadion im. Henryka Reymana; Attendance: 25,093; Referee: Philip Farrugia (Malta)

29 August 2024 Second leg	Cercle Brugge (Belgium)	1–4 (7–5 agg.)	(Poland) Wisła Kraków	Bruges, Belgium
20:00 UTC+2	Francis (yellow card) 28'; Felipe Augusto 77'	Report	Uryga 15'; Kiss 18'; Jaroch (yellow card) 64'; Gogół 73'; Alfaro (yellow card) 75'; Łasicki (yellow card) 90+1'; Zwoliński 90+4'	Stadium: Jan Breydelstadion; Attendance: 5,654; Referee: Horațiu Feșnic (Romania)

== Squad and statistics ==
=== Appearances, goals and discipline ===
As of match played 29 May 2025

No.	Pos.	Name	I liga		Polish Cup Polish Supercup		Europa League Conference League		Total	
No.	Pos.	Name	Apps	Goals	Apps	Goals	Apps	Goals	Apps	Goals
1	GK	(Poland) Kamil Broda	4+1	0	0	0	4	0	9	0
4	DF	(Poland) Rafał Mikulec	33	5	2+1	0	7+1	0	44	5
5	DF	(Sweden) Joseph Colley	3+1	0	0	0	4	0	8	0
6	DF	(Poland) Alan Uryga	29+1	3	2	1	8	2	40	6
8	MF	(Spain) Marc Carbó	17+6	0	0+3	0	8	1	34	1
9	FW	(Spain) Ángel Rodado	32+1	23	1+1	1	8	6	43	30
10	MF	(Portugal) Frederico Duarte	16+15	4	2+1	2	2+2	0	38	6
12	MF	(Nigeria) James Igbekeme	26+2	0	3	0	0	0	31	0
13	MF	(Hungary) Tamás Kiss	13+17	3	0+3	0	4	1	37	4
17	MF	(Spain) Jesús Alfaro	14+13	3	2+1	0	0+2	0	32	3
18	MF	(Poland) Bartosz Talar	0	0	0	0	0	0	0	0
19	MF	(Poland) Olivier Sukiennicki	10+13	2	3	0	7+1	0	34	2
20	MF	(Poland) Karol Dziedzic	0+5	0	0	0	1+2	0	8	0
21	MF	(Poland) Patryk Gogół	3+13	0	1	0	3+5	1	25	1
22	MF	(Poland) Piotr Starzyński	4+3	0	0	0	2+3	1	12	1
24	MF	(North Macedonia) Enis Fazlagikj	0	0	0	0	0	0	0	0
25	DF	(Poland) Bartosz Jaroch	33+1	1	2	0	7+1	0	44	1
26	DF	(Poland) Igor Łasicki	14+1	0	1	0	1	0	17	0
28	GK	(Poland) Patryk Letkiewicz	24	0	1	0	0	0	25	0
30	DF	(Greece) Giannis Kiakos	5+15	1	1	0	3+3	1	27	2
31	GK	(Belarus) Anton Chichkan	7	0	2	0	4	0	13	0
41	MF	(Poland) Kacper Duda	12+9	1	1+1	0	0	0	23	1
43	DF	(Poland) Dawid Szot	1+2	0	1	0	0	0	4	0
50	DF	(Poland) Mariusz Kutwa	11+2	1	1+1	0	0+6	0	21	1
51	FW	(Poland) Maciej Kuziemka	0+6	0	0+1	0	0	0	7	0
56	MF	(Poland) Filip Baniowski	0+2	0	0	0	0	0	2	0
75	DF	(Poland) Kacper Skrobański	0	0	0+1	0	0	0	1	0
77	MF	(Spain) Ángel Baena	26+8	3	2	0	5+3	0	44	3
88	MF	(Serbia) Marko Poletanović	9+2	0	1	0	0	0	12	0
97	DF	(Poland) Wiktor Biedrzycki	16+1	1	2	0	3+1	0	23	1
99	FW	(Poland) Łukasz Zwoliński	22+12	10	2+1	1	3+2	0	42	11
Players transferred or loaned out during the season
7	MF	(Poland) Igor Sapała	1	0	0	0	3	1	4	1
11	MF	(Poland) Mateusz Młyński	1	0	0	0	1+1	0	3	0
15	FW	(Poland) Marcin Bartoń	0	0	0	0	0	0	0	0
51	MF	(Poland) Karol Tokarczyk	0	0	0	0	0	0	0	0
52	DF	(Poland) Jakub Krzyżanowski	0	0	0	0	0+1	0	1	0
53	GK	(Poland) Jakub Stępak	0	0	0	0	0	0	0	0
54	DF	(Poland) Kuba Wiśniewski	0	0	0	0	0+1	0	1	0
80	MF	(Poland) Dawid Olejarka	0	0	0	0	0	0	0	0

=== Goalscorers ===
As of match played 29 May 2025

Rank	Pos.	Nat	No.	Player	I liga	Polish Cup Polish Supercup	Europa League Conference League	Total
1	FW	(Spain)	9	Ángel Rodado	23	1	6	30
2	FW	(Poland)	99	Łukasz Zwoliński	10	1	0	11
3	DF	(Poland)	6	Alan Uryga	3	1	2	6
3	MF	(Portugal)	10	Frederico Duarte	4	2	0	6
4	DF	(Poland)	4	Rafał Mikulec	5	0	0	5
5	MF	(Hungary)	13	Tamás Kiss	3	0	1	4
7	MF	(Spain)	17	Jesús Alfaro	3	0	0	3
7	MF	(Spain)	77	Ángel Baena	3	0	0	3
9	MF	(Poland)	19	Olivier Sukiennicki	2	0	0	2
9	DF	(Greece)	30	Giannis Kiakos	1	0	1	2
11	MF	(Poland)	7	Igor Sapała	0	0	1	1
11	MF	(Spain)	8	Marc Carbó	0	0	1	1
11	MF	(Poland)	21	Patryk Gogół	0	0	1	1
11	MF	(Poland)	22	Piotr Starzyński	0	0	1	1
11	DF	(Poland)	25	Bartosz Jaroch	1	0	0	1
11	MF	(Poland)	41	Kacper Duda	1	0	0	1
11	DF	(Poland)	50	Mariusz Kutwa	1	0	0	1
11	DF	(Poland)	97	Wiktor Biedrzycki	1	0	0	1
				Own goal	2	0	1	3
TOTALS					63	5	15	83

=== Disciplinary record ===
No.	Pos.	Nat	Name	I liga			Polish Cup Polish Supercup			Europa League Conference League			Total			Notes
No.	Pos.	Nat	Name	Yellow card	Second yellow card	Red card	Yellow card	Second yellow card	Red card	Yellow card	Second yellow card	Red card	Yellow card	Second yellow card	Red card	Notes
4	DF	(Poland)	Rafał Mikulec	9			1						10			
5	DF	(Sweden)	Joseph Colley	2									2			
6	DF	(Poland)	Alan Uryga	9						1			10			
8	MF	(Spain)	Marc Carbó	4			1						5			
9	FW	(Spain)	Ángel Rodado	4			1			1			6			
10	MF	(Portugal)	Frederico Duarte	1			1						2			
12	MF	(Nigeria)	James Igbekeme	4	1		1						5	1		
13	MF	(Hungary)	Tamás Kiss	4	1								4	1		
17	FW	(Spain)	Jesús Alfaro	2						1			3			
19	MF	(Poland)	Olivier Sukiennicki	8						2			10			
22	MF	(Poland)	Piotr Starzyński	1									1			
25	DF	(Poland)	Bartosz Jaroch	6						4			10			
26	DF	(Poland)	Igor Łasicki	6			1			1			8			
28	GK	(Poland)	Patryk Letkiewicz	1		1							1		1	
30	DF	(Greece)	Giannis Kiakos	3						1			4			
41	MF	(Poland)	Kacper Duda	4									4			
50	DF	(Poland)	Mariusz Kutwa	1									1			
77	MF	(Spain)	Ángel Baena	1									1			
88	MF	(Serbia)	Marko Poletanović	4									4			
97	DF	(Poland)	Wiktor Biedrzycki	6	1	1	2	1					8	2	1	
99	FW	(Poland)	Łukasz Zwoliński	2									2			

Last updated: 29 May 2025
Source: Competitive matches
Only competitive matches
(yellow card) = Number of bookings; (second yellow card) = Number of sending offs after a second yellow card; (red card) = Number of sending offs by a direct red card.
