= 2024 Polish Super Cup =

Football competition

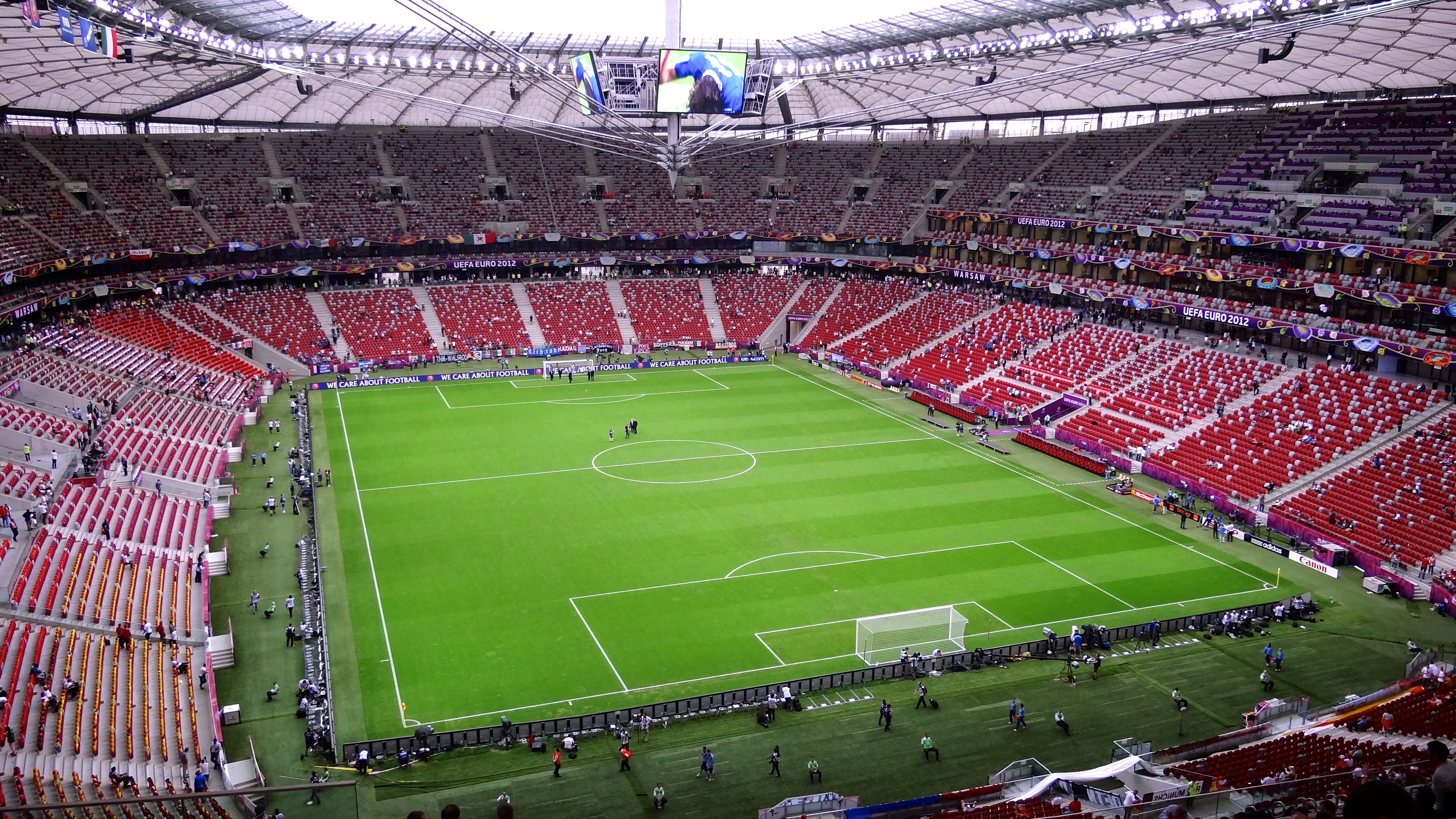
- The National Stadium in Warsaw hosted the final.
Jagiellonia Białystok	Wisła Kraków
1	0
- Date: 2 April 2025
- Venue: National Stadium, Warsaw
- Referee: Jarosław Przybył (Kluczbork)
- Attendance: 10,935
- Weather: 17 °C (63 °F)

The 2024 Polish Super Cup was the 33rd Polish Super Cup, an annual Polish football match played between the reigning winners of the Ekstraklasa and Polish Cup. The Ekstraklasa champions Jagiellonia Białystok faced Polish Cup winners Wisła Kraków.

Initially, the Polish Football Association (PZPN) scheduled the match for Sunday, 7 July 2024. However, due to the priority of international competitions in which both teams were set to participate, a three-way decision was made to postpone the Super Cup match to a later date. Further speculation suggested that the match could take place on 7 December, but the president of Jagiellonia Białystok, Wojciech Pertkiewicz, denied this information, pointing out that the club had a league match scheduled for 8 December. Later discussions between PZPN and both clubs indicated that the match might be played in 2025, with a possible date in February. During the talks, a proposal emerged to hold the Polish Super Cup in Miami, USA. PZPN president Cezary Kulesza confirmed that teams had been offered the opportunity to play abroad.

In January 2025, media reports unofficially stated that Jagiellonia and Wisła had agreed on a date (24 April in Białystok), but this was not confirmed. In March, a proposal emerged to hold the Super Cup match on 2 April, which was confirmed by Jagiellonia Białystok’s coach, Adrian Siemieniec. However, Wisła Kraków president, Jarosław Królewski, stated that the club had not received any official information on the matter, either from Jagiellonia or the national association. PZPN’s general secretary, Łukasz Wachowski, stated that the federation was aiming for an April date, though the final decision depended on the teams' availability, especially in the context of Jagiellonia’s participation in the UEFA Conference League. On 7 March, PZPN announced that the Super Cup would take place on 2 April at 21:00 in Białystok. On 21 March, it was confirmed that the final would not be played in Białystok, but rather in Warsaw at the National Stadium.

Jagiellonia won 1–0 to secure their second title in as many Polish Super Cup appearances, having previously won it in 2010.

Due to an unusual date, a late change of the venue, high ticket prices, and a boycott announced by part of Jagiellonia's supporter community, the match was attended by 10,935 people, setting the record for the lowest-ever attendance for a football event at the National Stadium.

== Match ==
2 April 2025
21:00 CEST (UTC+02:00)

Jagiellonia Białystok	1–0	Wisła Kraków
Villar 14'	Report

National Stadium, Warsaw
Attendance: 10,935
Referee: Jarosław Przybył (Kluczbork)

Jagiellonia Białystok	Wisła Kraków

GK	50	(Poland) Sławomir Abramowicz
LB	44	(Portugal) João Moutinho
CB	23	(Cameroon) Enzo Ebosse	(yellow card) 36'
CB	72	(Poland) Mateusz Skrzypczak
RB	15	(Poland) Norbert Wojtuszek
CM	11	(Spain) Jesús Imaz	(yellow card) 74'
CM	6	(Poland) Taras Romanczuk (c)
CM	31	(United States) Leon Flach		(substituted off) 66'
LW	21	(North Macedonia) Darko Churlinov		(substituted off) 66'
FW	10	(Angola) Afimico Pululu		(substituted off) 77'
RW	20	(Spain) Miki Villar		(substituted off) 77'
Substitutes:
GK	1	(Poland) Maksymilian Stryjek
DF	5	(Poland) Cezary Polak
DF	3	(Slovenia) Dušan Stojinović
DF	82	(Portugal) Tomás Silva
MF	7	(Portugal) Edi Semedo
MF	14	(Poland) Jarosław Kubicki		(substituted on) 66'
FW	9	(France) Lamine Diaby-Fadiga	(yellow card) 90'	(substituted on) 77'
FW	80	(Poland) Oskar Pietuszewski		(substituted on) 77'
FW	99	(Norway) Kristoffer Normann Hansen		(substituted on) 66'
Manager:
(Poland) Adrian Siemieniec

GK	28	(Poland) Patryk Letkiewicz
LB	4	(Poland) Rafał Mikulec
CB	97	(Poland) Wiktor Biedrzycki
CB	6	(Poland) Alan Uryga (c)
RB	25	(Poland) Bartosz Jaroch
DM	12	(Nigeria) James Igbekeme	(substituted off) 80'
DM	88	(Serbia) Marko Poletanović	(substituted off) 58'
LW	10	(Portugal) Frederico Duarte	(yellow card) 75'	(substituted off) 80'
AM	19	(Poland) Olivier Sukiennicki	(substituted off) 73'
RW	77	(Spain) Ángel Baena	(substituted off) 58'
CF	99	(Poland) Łukasz Zwoliński
Substitutes:
GK	1	(Poland) Kamil Broda
DF	26	(Poland) Igor Łasicki
DF	30	(Greece) Giannis Kiakos
MF	8	(Spain) Marc Carbó	(substituted on) 80'
MF	41	(Poland) Kacper Duda	(substituted on) 58'
MF	56	(Poland) Filip Baniowski
CF	13	(Hungary) Tamás Kiss	(substituted on) 58'
CF	17	(Spain) Jesús Alfaro	(substituted on) 73'
CF	51	(Poland) Maciej Kuziemka	(substituted on) 80'
Manager:
(Poland) Mariusz Jop

Match rules

- 90 minutes.
- Penalty shoot-out if scores still level.
- Nine named substitutes.
- Maximum of five substitutions.

== See also ==
- 2024–25 Ekstraklasa
- 2024–25 I liga
- 2024–25 Polish Cup
