= 2025–26 Wisła Kraków season =

Wisła Kraków
2025–26 season
- Manager: Mariusz Jop
- Stadium: Stadion im. Henryka Reymana
- I liga: 1st (promoted)
- Polish Cup: Round of 16
- Top goalscorer: League: Ángel Rodado (21); All: Ángel Rodado (22)
- Highest home attendance: 33,000 (vs. Chrobry Głogów, 8 May 2026; I liga); 33,000 (vs. Pogoń Siedlce, 24 May 2026; I liga)
- Lowest home attendance: 18,025 (vs. Polonia Bytom, 29 September 2025; I liga)
- Average home league attendance: 27,046
- Biggest win: Znicz Pruszków 0–7 Wisła Kraków
- Biggest defeat: Śląsk Wrocław 3–0 Wisła Kraków (awarded)
Home colours	Away colours	Third colours
- All statistics correct as of 24 May 2026.

The 2025–26 Wisła Kraków season was the 120th season in the history of Wisła Kraków, and the club's fourth consecutive season in I liga (11th in total). Wisła won the league title with 71 points, securing promotion back to the Ekstraklasa after four seasons in the second tier.

== Transfers ==
=== In ===
Pos.	Player	Transferred from	Fee	Date	Source
DF	(Netherlands) Julian Lelieveld	(Netherlands) RKC Waalwijk	Free	2025	
DF	(Austria) Darijo Grujčić	(Netherlands) Fortuna Sittard	Free	2025	
DF	(Switzerland) Raoul Giger	(Switzerland) Lausanne-Sport	Free	2025	
MF	(Austria) Julius Ertlthaler	(Poland) GKS Tychy	Free	2025	
MF	(Bosnia and Herzegovina) Ervin Omić	(Austria) Wolfsberger AC	Free	August 2025	
MF	(Croatia) Marko Božić	(Turkey) BB Erzurumspor	Free	August 2025	
FW	(Albania) Ardit Nikaj	(Albania) Skënderbeu	Loan	2025	
MF	(Poland) Wiktor Staszak	(Poland) KKS 1925 Kalisz	Undisclosed	2025	
FW	(Spain) Jordi Sánchez	(Poland) Widzew Łódź	Free	2025	
DF	(Poland) Jakub Krzyżanowski	(Italy) Torino Primavera	Return from loan	1 July 2025	
MF	(Poland) Dawid Olejarka	(Poland) Znicz Pruszków	Return from loan	1 July 2025	
DF	(Poland) Kuba Wiśniewski	(Poland) Wieczysta Kraków	Return from loan	1 July 2025	

=== Out ===
Pos.	Player	Transferred to	Fee	Date	Source
FW	(Poland) Łukasz Zwoliński	(Turkey) Sakaryaspor	Undisclosed	23 July 2025	
MF	(Serbia) Marko Poletanović	(Serbia) FK Vojvodina	Undisclosed	2025	
MF	(Spain) Ángel Baena	(Poland) Widzew Łódź	End of contract	1 July 2025	
MF	(Spain) Jesús Alfaro	(Denmark) Kolding IF	End of contract	1 July 2025	
DF	(Poland) Dawid Szot	(Poland) Zagłębie Sosnowiec	End of contract	1 July 2025	
MF	(Poland) Karol Dziedzic	(Poland) Warta Poznań	Loan	2025	
FW	(Albania) Ardit Nikaj	(Albania) AF Elbasani	End of loan	30 June 2026	

== Competitions ==
=== Overall record ===
Competition	First match	Last match	Starting round	Final position	Record							
Competition	First match	Last match	Starting round	Final position	Pld	W	D	L	GF	GA	GD	Win %
I liga	20 July 2025	24 May 2026	Matchday 1	1st	34	20	11	3	72	32	+40	58.82
Polish Cup	25 September 2025	4 December 2025	First round	Round of 16	3	2	0	1	3	4	−1	66.67
Total					37	22	11	4	75	36	+39	59.46

Last updated: complete
Source: 90minut.pl

=== I liga ===
==== League table ====
Pos	Team	Pld	W	D	L	GF	GA	GD	Pts	Promotion or Relegation
1	Wisła Kraków (C, P)	34	20	11	3	72	32	+40	71	Promotion to Ekstraklasa
2	Śląsk Wrocław (P)	34	17	11	6	69	47	+22	62	Promotion to Ekstraklasa
3	Wieczysta Kraków (O, P)	34	16	9	9	70	47	+23	57	Qualification for promotion play-offs
4	Chrobry Głogów	34	16	7	11	48	36	+12	55	Qualification for promotion play-offs
5	ŁKS Łódź	34	15	9	10	56	48	+8	54	Qualification for promotion play-offs

Source: 1liga.org, 90minut.pl
Rules for classification: 1) Points; 2) Head-to-head points; 3) Head-to-head goal difference; 4) Goal difference; 6) Goals scored; 7) Number of wins; 8) Number of away wins.
(Note: Head-to-head record is used only after all the matches between the teams in question have been played)
(C) Champions; (O) Play-off winner; (P) Promoted

Semi-finals; 28 May 2026
3	Wieczysta Kraków	3
6	Polonia Warsaw	2
4	Chrobry Głogów	1 (5)
5	ŁKS Łódź	1 (4)

Final; 31 May 2026
3	Wieczysta Kraków	2
4	Chrobry Głogów	1

==== Matches ====
Matchday 1

20 July 2025 1	Stal Mielec	0–4	Wisła Kraków	Mielec
14:30 UTC+2		Report	Zwoliński 29'; Jaroch 44'; Rodado 55', 65'	Attendance: 4,995

Matchday 2

26 July 2025 2	Wisła Kraków	5–0	ŁKS Łódź	Kraków
15:00 UTC+2	Duarte 17', 28', 33'; Kutwa 30'; Rodado 59'	Report		Stadium: Stadion im. Henryka Reymana; Attendance: 27,017

Matchday 3

4 August 2025 3	GKS Tychy	3–4	Wisła Kraków	Tychy
19:00 UTC+2	Weźniak 6'; Bieroński 68'; Błachewicz 82'	Report	Ertlthaler 29'; Rodado 54', 61'; Lelieveld 83'	Stadium: Stadion Miejski; Attendance: 7,480

Matchday 4

10 August 2025 4	Wisła Kraków	3–2	Pogoń Grodzisk Mazowiecki	Kraków
14:30 UTC+2	Kuziemka 9'; Ertlthaler 14'; Biedrzycki 31'	Report	Gajgier 12'; Farbiszewski 73'	Stadium: Stadion im. Henryka Reymana; Attendance: 30,766

Matchday 5 (postponed multiple times)

2 October 2025 5	Wieczysta Kraków	1–1	Wisła Kraków	Kraków
19:15 UTC+2	Feiertag 45'	Report	Biedrzycki 90'	Stadium: Stadion Miejski; Attendance: 31,813
Note: Originally scheduled for 15 August in Sosnowiec; postponed twice before being played at the Stadion Miejski with Wieczysta as the nominal home team. Kick-off was delayed 15 minutes due to crowd access issues.

Matchday 6

19 August 2025 6	Znicz Pruszków	0–7	Wisła Kraków	Pruszków
20:30 UTC+2		Report	Rodado 6' (pen.), 49'; Krzyżanowski 22'; Duarte 45'; Ertlthaler 52'; Igbekeme 78'; Kawała 86'	Stadium: Stadion Znicza Pruszków; Attendance: 1,943

Matchday 7

24 August 2025 7	Wisła Kraków	5–0	Śląsk Wrocław	Kraków
14:30 UTC+2	Rodado 12', 16', 63'; Biedrzycki 47'; Nikaj 84'	Report		Stadium: Stadion im. Henryka Reymana; Attendance: 32,710

Matchday 8

29 August 2025 8	Miedź Legnica	2–0	Wisła Kraków	Legnica
20:30 UTC+2	Mioč 34'; Stanclik 62'	Report		Stadium: Stadion Miejski im. Orła Białego; Attendance: 4,387

Matchday 9

13 September 2025 9	Wisła Kraków	2–2	Odra Opole	Kraków
19:30 UTC+2	Biedrzycki 32'; Kuziemka 66'	Report	Purzycki 7'; Kobusiński 54'	Stadium: Stadion im. Henryka Reymana; Attendance: 32,583

Matchday 10

21 September 2025 10	Górnik Łęczna	1–2	Wisła Kraków	Łęczna
14:30 UTC+2	Śpiączka 9'	Report	Rodado 77' (pen.); Grujčić 90'	Attendance: 2,860

Matchday 11

29 September 2025 11	Wisła Kraków	1–0	Polonia Bytom	Kraków
19:00 UTC+2	Igbekeme 70'	Report		Stadium: Stadion im. Henryka Reymana; Attendance: 18,025

Matchday 12

5 October 2025 12	Wisła Kraków	3–0	Ruch Chorzów	Kraków
20:30 UTC+2	Kuziemka 45'; Rodado 48'; Szymański 56' (o.g.)	Report		Stadium: Stadion im. Henryka Reymana; Attendance: 29,613

Matchday 13

20 October 2025 13	Puszcza Niepołomice	0–3	Wisła Kraków	Niepołomice
19:00 UTC+2		Report	Kuziemka 9'; Igbekeme 29'; Rodado 42'	Attendance: 2,000

Matchday 14

26 October 2025 14	Wisła Kraków	2–1	Stal Rzeszów	Kraków
14:30 UTC+2	Ertlthaler 3'; Rodado 69'	Report	Darwish 75'	Stadium: Stadion im. Henryka Reymana; Attendance: 18,221

Matchday 15

2 November 2025 15	Chrobry Głogów	0–1	Wisła Kraków	Głogów
14:30 UTC+1		Report	Rodado 25'	Attendance: 2,407

Matchday 16

8 November 2025 16	Wisła Kraków	1–2	Polonia Warsaw	Kraków
14:30 UTC+1	Rodado 16' (pen.)	Report	Dadok 10'; Gnaase 79'	Stadium: Stadion im. Henryka Reymana; Attendance: 27,613

Matchday 17

22 November 2025 17	Wisła Kraków	1–1	Wieczysta Kraków	Kraków
19:30 UTC+1	Rodado 43' (pen.)	Report	Dzięgielewski 79'	Stadium: Stadion im. Henryka Reymana; Attendance: 32,724
Note: Originally Matchday 22; date may vary.

Matchday 18

30 November 2025 18	Wisła Kraków	3–0	Stal Mielec	Kraków
20:15 UTC+1	Duda 28'; Duarte 33'; Rodado 40'	Report		Stadium: Stadion im. Henryka Reymana; Attendance: 19,167

Matchday 19

7 December 2025 19	ŁKS Łódź	1–1	Wisła Kraków	Łódź
14:30 UTC+1	Crăciun 4' (pen.)	Report	Łasicki 63'	Attendance: 8,562

Matchday 20

6 February 2026 20	Wisła Kraków	3–1	GKS Tychy	Kraków
20:30 UTC+1	Kuziemka 28', 30'; Biedrzycki 72'	Report	Carbó 18' (o.g.)	Stadium: Stadion im. Henryka Reymana; Attendance: 20,958

Matchday 21

15 February 2026 21	Pogoń Grodzisk Mazowiecki	1–1	Wisła Kraków	Pruszków
14:30 UTC+1	Niewiadomski 54'	Report	Rodado 75'	Attendance: 1,625

Matchday 22

20 February 2026 22	Wisła Kraków	1–1	Wieczysta Kraków	Kraków
20:30 UTC+1	Rodado 43' (pen.)	Report	Dzięgielewski 79'	Stadium: Stadion im. Henryka Reymana; Attendance: 32,724

Matchday 23

1 March 2026 23	Wisła Kraków	1–1	Znicz Pruszków	Kraków
14:30 UTC+1	Lelieveld 47'	Report	Ciepiela 80'	Stadium: Stadion im. Henryka Reymana; Attendance: 26,939

Matchday 24

7 March 2026 24	Śląsk Wrocław	3–0	Wisła Kraków	Wrocław
17:30 UTC+1
Note: Match awarded 3–0 to Śląsk Wrocław after Wisła Kraków refused to travel to the fixture.

Matchday 25

13 March 2026 25	Wisła Kraków	3–2	Miedź Legnica	Kraków
20:30 UTC+1	Rodado 8', 88'; Sánchez 82'	Report	Kwiecień 52'; Bochnak 65'	Stadium: Stadion im. Henryka Reymana; Attendance: 24,113

Matchday 26

21 March 2026 26	Odra Opole	1–1	Wisła Kraków	Opole
14:00 UTC+1	Purzycki 35'	Report	Božić 37'	Attendance: 9,865

Matchday 27

6 April 2026 27	Wisła Kraków	3–2	Górnik Łęczna	Kraków
11:30 UTC+2	Duarte 19'; Božić 37'; Ertlthaler 41'	Report	Spáčil 11'; Hołownia 29'	Stadium: Stadion im. Henryka Reymana; Attendance: 23,630
Note: Originally scheduled for 2 April; postponed due to national team call-ups.

Matchday 28

12 April 2026 28	Polonia Bytom	1–1	Wisła Kraków	Bytom
14:30 UTC+2	Kwiatkowski 60'	Report	Božić 67'	Attendance: 2,002

Matchday 29

19 April 2026 29	Ruch Chorzów	1–1	Wisła Kraków	Chorzów
14:30 UTC+2	Szwedzik 15'	Report	Duarte 66'	Stadium: Superauto.pl Stadion Śląski; Attendance: 53,314

Matchday 30

24 April 2026 30	Wisła Kraków	2–2	Puszcza Niepołomice	Kraków
20:30 UTC+2	Duarte 45'; Sánchez 71'	Report	Letkiewicz 58' (o.g.); Gjoni 77'	Stadium: Stadion im. Henryka Reymana; Attendance: 29,703

Matchday 31

3 May 2026 31	Stal Rzeszów	1–2	Wisła Kraków	Rzeszów
20:15 UTC+2	Kędziołka 26'	Report	Duarte 49', 71'	Attendance: 6,129

Matchday 32

8 May 2026 32	Wisła Kraków	2–0	Chrobry Głogów	Kraków
21:00 UTC+2	Lelieveld 15'; Božić 48'	Report		Stadium: Stadion im. Henryka Reymana; Attendance: 33,000

Matchday 33

15 May 2026 33	Polonia Warsaw	0–1	Wisła Kraków	Warsaw
20:30 UTC+2		Report	Božić 18'	Attendance: 5,226

Matchday 34

24 May 2026 34	Wisła Kraków	2–0	Pogoń Siedlce	Kraków
16:30 UTC+2	Biedrzycki 41'; Božić 72'	Report		Stadium: Stadion im. Henryka Reymana; Attendance: 33,000

=== Polish Cup ===
25 September 2025 First round	Odra Bytom Odrzański	0–1	Wisła Kraków	Bytom Odrzański
14:30 UTC+2		Report	Rodado 82'	Attendance: 2,054

29 October 2025 Round of 32	Hutnik Kraków	0–1	Wisła Kraków	Kraków
13:00 UTC+1		Report	Duda 61'	Attendance: 999

4 December 2025 Round of 16	Zawisza Bydgoszcz	4–1	Wisła Kraków	Bydgoszcz
20:45 UTC+1	Kona 32' (pen.), 64'; Staniak 53'; Duarte 60' (o.g.)	Report	Nikaj 25'	Attendance: 9,800
