= Anton Chichkan =

Belarusian footballer

Personal information
- Date of birth: 10 July 1995 (age 31)
- Place of birth: Minsk, Belarus
- Height: 1.86 m (6 ft 1 in)
- Position: Goalkeeper

Team information
- Current team: Stal Mielec
- Number: 31

Youth career
- 2013–2016: BATE Borisov

Senior career*
Years	Team	Apps	(Gls)
2016–2021	BATE Borisov	51	(0)
2016	→ Smolevichi-STI (loan)	15	(0)
2022	Ufa	4	(0)
2022	Dinamo Tbilisi	0	(0)
2023	Dinamo Batumi	16	(0)
2024–2026	Wisła Kraków	13	(0)
2025–2026	Wisła Kraków II	12	(0)
2026–	Stal Mielec	0	(0)

International career
2014–2016	Belarus U21	5	(0)
2020	Belarus	1	(0)
- * Club domestic league appearances and goals as of 11:37, 8 November 2026 (UTC)

Anton Chichkan (Belarusian: Антон Чычкан; Russian: Антон Чичкан; born 10 July 1995) is a Belarusian professional footballer who plays as a goalkeeper for I liga club Stal Mielec. He has also appeared for the Belarus national team and the national U21 team.

== Club career ==
On 17 January 2022, he signed a two-and-a-half-year contract with Russian Premier League club Ufa. Chichkan left Ufa by mutual consent on 29 June 2022.

On 13 September 2022, Chichkan signed for Dinamo Tbilisi on a contract until the end of the season, with the option of an additional year.

On 21 February 2024, he joined Polish second division side Wisła Kraków on a deal until the end of the season, with an extension option. In only his second appearance for the club, Chichkan won the 2023–24 Polish Cup after a 2–1 victory over Pogoń Szczecin in the final on 2 May 2024. On 30 May that year, Chichkan's contract was extended for a further year. He left the club at the end of the 2025–26 season.

On 7 November 2026, Chichkan signed an eight-month contract with I liga side Stal Mielec.

== Career statistics ==
=== Club ===
As of match played 24 May 2026

Appearances and goals by club, season and competition
Club	Season	League			National cup (Note: Includes Belarusian Cup, Georgian Cup, Polish Cup)		Continental		Other		Total	
Club	Season	Division	Apps	Goals	Apps	Goals	Apps	Goals	Apps	Goals	Apps	Goals
BATE Borisov	2015	Belarusian Premier League	0	0	0	0	0	0	—		0	0
BATE Borisov	2017	Belarusian Premier League	3	0	2	0	0	0	—		5	0
BATE Borisov	2018	Belarusian Premier League	4	0	2	0	0	0	—		6	0
BATE Borisov	2019	Belarusian Premier League	12	0	2	0	8 (Note: Four appearances in UEFA Champions League, four appearances in UEFA Europa League)	0	1 (Note: Appearances in Belarusian Super Cup)	0	23	0
BATE Borisov	2020	Belarusian Premier League	16	0	5	0	0	0	—		21	0
BATE Borisov	2021	Belarusian Premier League	16	0	3	0	2 (Note: Appearances in UEFA Conference League)	0	1	0	22	0
BATE Borisov	Total		51	0	14	0	10	0	2	0	77	0
Smolevichi (loan)	2016	Belarusian Premier League	15	0	1	0	—		—		16	0
Ufa	2021–22	Russian Premier League	4	0	—		—		2 (Note: Appearances in the relegation play-offs)	0	6	0
Dinamo Tbilisi	2022	Erovnuli Liga	0	0	0	0	—		—		0	0
Dinamo Batumi	2023	Erovnuli Liga	16	0	3	0	2	0	2 (Note: Appearances in Georgian Super Cup)	0	23	0
Wisła Kraków	2023–24	I liga	5	0	1	0	—		—		6	0
Wisła Kraków	2024–25	I liga	7	0	2	0	4	0	0	0	13	0
Wisła Kraków	2025–26	I liga	1	0	0	0	—		—		1	0
Wisła Kraków	Total		13	0	3	0	4	0	0	0	20	0
Wisła Kraków II	2024–25	III liga, gr. IV	2	0	—		—		—		2	0
Wisła Kraków II	2025–26	III liga, gr. IV	10	0	—		—		—		10	0
Wisła Kraków II	Total		12	0	—		—		—		12	0
Stal Mielec	2026–27	I liga	0	0	—		—		—		0	0
Career total			111	0	21	0	16	0	6	0	154	0

=== International ===
Appearances and goals by national team and year
National team	Year	Apps	Goals
Belarus
Belarus	2020	1	0
Total		1	0

== Honours ==
BATE Borisov

- Belarusian Premier League: 2017, 2018
- Belarusian Cup: 2019–20, 2020–21
- Belarusian Super Cup: 2017

Dinamo Batumi

- Erovnuli Liga: 2023

Wisła Kraków

- I liga: 2025–26
- Polish Cup: 2023–24
