= Zyra =

Zyra may refer to:

- Zyra (singer), singer known for being featured in the songs "Say My Name" and "It's Only" by Odesza
- Paweł Żyra (born 1998), Polish footballer
- A fictional planet from the 1951 film, When Worlds Collide
- Zyra, Rise of the thorns, a playable champion character in the multiplayer online battle arena video game League of Legends

== See also ==
- Zyras, a genus of beetles
