= Piotr Starzyński =

Polish footballer (born 2004)

Personal information
- Date of birth: 22 January 2004 (age 22)
- Place of birth: Katowice, Poland
- Height: 1.73 m (5 ft 8 in)
- Position: Winger

Team information
- Current team: Wisła Kraków
- Number: 22

Youth career
- 2015–2016: Sprint Katowice
- 2016–2017: Ruch Radzionków
- 2017–2020: Ruch Chorzów
- 2020–2021: Wisła Kraków

Senior career*
Years	Team	Apps	(Gls)
2021–	Wisła Kraków	52	(1)
2023–2024	→ Górnik Łęczna (loan)	27	(3)
2024	→ Górnik Łęczna II (loan)	1	(0)
2024–	Wisła Kraków II	3	(1)

International career
2017	Poland U14	1	(0)
2019	Poland U15	4	(1)
2019–2020	Poland U16	4	(1)
2022	Poland U18	2	(0)
2021	Poland U19	5	(1)
2024	Poland U20	1	(0)
2021	Poland U21	1	(0)
- * Club domestic league appearances and goals as of 13:36, 26 May 2026 (UTC)

Piotr Starzyński (born 22 January 2004) is a Polish professional footballer who plays as a winger for Ekstraklasa club Wisła Kraków.

== Career statistics ==
As of match played 6 December 2024

Appearances and goals by club, season and competition
Club	Season	League			Polish Cup		Europe		Other		Total	
Club	Season	Division	Apps	Goals	Apps	Goals	Apps	Goals	Apps	Goals	Apps	Goals
Wisła Kraków	2020–21	Ekstraklasa	15	1	—		—		—		15	1
Wisła Kraków	2021–22	Ekstraklasa	18	0	4	0	—		—		22	0
Wisła Kraków	2022–23	I liga	12	0	2	0	—		—		14	0
Wisła Kraków	2024–25	I liga	7	0	0	0	5 (Note: Two appearances in UEFA Europa League, three appearances and one goal in UEFA Conference League)	1	0	0	12	1
Wisła Kraków	2025–26	I liga	0	0	0	0	—		—		0	0
Wisła Kraków	Total		52	1	6	0	5	1	0	0	63	2
Górnik Łęczna (loan)	2023–24	I liga	27	3	1	0	—		—		28	3
Górnik Łęczna II (loan)	2023–24	IV liga Lublin	1	0	—		—		—		1	0
Wisła Kraków II	2024–25	III liga, gr. IV	3	1	—		—		—		3	1
Career total			83	5	7	0	5	1	0	0	95	6
