= Marko Božič =

Marko Božič may refer to:

- Marko Božič (Slovenian footballer) (born 1984)
- Marko Božić (Austrian footballer) (born 1998)
