= Charlie Wood (footballer) =

English footballer

Personal information
- Full name: Charles Hamilton Wood
- Date of birth: 5 October 2002 (age 24)
- Height: 6 ft 0 in (1.83 m)
- Position: Forward

Team information
- Current team: UNC Asheville Bulldogs

Youth career
- Bradford City

College career
Years	Team	Apps	(Gls)
2024–	UNC Asheville Bulldogs	27	(2)

Senior career*
Years	Team	Apps	(Gls)
2020–2023	Bradford City	0	(0)
2021–2022	→ Ossett United (loan)	14	(1)
2022–2023	→ Guiseley (loan)	12	(0)
2023	→ Stocksbridge Park Steels (loan)	12	(2)
- * Club domestic league appearances and goals as of 20:56, 28 April 2026 (UTC)

Charles Hamilton Wood (born 5 October 2002) is an English professional footballer who plays college soccer for UNC Asheville Bulldogs as a forward.

== Career ==
Wood began his career with Bradford City, captaining their youth team.

He made his senior debut for Bradford City on 10 November 2020, alongside fellow youth team player Olivier Sukiennicki, appearing as an 80th minute substitute in the EFL Trophy in a 3–1 home defeat against Oldham Athletic. Two days later he was named in the League Football Education's 'The 11' list for November 2020, which recognises both football and non-footballing activities of young players.

In May 2021 he won the 2020–21 Academy Player of the Year award at Bradford City's end-of-season awards.

On 17 June 2021 Wood signed a one-year professional contract with Bradford City. He moved on loan to Ossett United in December 2021, scoring on his debut. The loan was extended in January 2022 until the end of the season.

He was one of seven players offered a new contract by Bradford City at the end of the 2021–22 season. He signed a new one-year contract with the club in June 2022.

In July 2022 he moved on loan to Guiseley. The loan ended in January 2023, after 13 appearances in all competitions for the club. In February 2023 he moved on loan to Stocksbridge Park Steels, scoring twice in 13 appearances.

In May 2023 it was announced that he would leave Bradford City when his contract expired on 30 June.

From 2024 he began playing college soccer for UNC Asheville Bulldogs.
