= Tamás Kiss (footballer, born 2000) =

Hungarian footballer

Personal information
- Date of birth: 24 November 2000 (age 25)
- Place of birth: Győr, Hungary
- Height: 1.67 m (5 ft 6 in)
- Position: Midfielder

Team information
- Current team: Anorthosis Famagusta
- Number: 7

Youth career
- 2005–2010: Téti Sokoró
- 2010–2012: Gyirmót
- 2012–2016: Haladás

Senior career*
Years	Team	Apps	(Gls)
2016–2018	Haladás	17	(4)
2018–2023	Puskás Akadémia	90	(6)
2019	→ Csákvár (loan)	1	(0)
2020	→ Diósgyőr (loan)	16	(0)
2021–2022	→ SC Cambuur (loan)	11	(1)
2023–2024	Újpest	26	(0)
2024–2025	Wisła Kraków	30	(3)
2025	Wisła Kraków II	1	(0)
2025–	Anorthosis Famagusta	22	(2)

International career
2015–2016	Hungary U16	13	(1)
2016–2017	Hungary U17	9	(0)
2017–2018	Hungary U18	10	(1)
2018–2019	Hungary U19	10	(2)
2019–2022	Hungary U21	11	(3)
2021	Hungary	2	(0)
- * Club domestic league appearances and goals as of 31 May 2026

Tamás Kiss (born 24 November 2000) is a Hungarian professional footballer who plays as a midfielder for Cypriot First Division club Anorthosis Famagusta.

== International career ==
He has played for Hungary internationally from U16 to U21 level.

He made his debut for Hungary national football team on 12 November 2021 in a World Cup qualifier against San Marino.

== Career statistics ==
=== Club ===
As of match played 20 December 2025

Appearances and goals by club, season and competition
Club	Season	League			National cup (Note: Includes Magyar Kupa, KNVB Cup, Polish Cup)		Europe		Other		Total	
Club	Season	Division	Apps	Goals	Apps	Goals	Apps	Goals	Apps	Goals	Apps	Goals
Haladás	2016–17	Nemzeti Bajnokság I	4	0	0	0	—		—		4	0
Haladás	2017–18	Nemzeti Bajnokság I	13	4	0	0	—		—		13	4
Haladás	Total		17	4	0	0	0	0	—		16	4
Puskás Akadémia	2018–19	Nemzeti Bajnokság I	30	3	4	0	—		—		34	3
Puskás Akadémia	2019–20	Nemzeti Bajnokság I	10	0	3	3	—		—		13	3
Puskás Akadémia	2020–21	Nemzeti Bajnokság I	32	3	3	1	1 (Note: Appearance in UEFA Europa League)	0	—		36	4
Puskás Akadémia	2021–22	Nemzeti Bajnokság I	2	0	0	0	4 (Note: Appearances in UEFA Conference League)	0	—		6	0
Puskás Akadémia	2022–23	Nemzeti Bajnokság I	16	0	2	0	2	0	—		20	0
Puskás Akadémia	Total		90	6	12	4	7	0	—		109	10
Csákvár (loan)	2019–20	Nemzeti Bajnokság II	1	0	0	0	—		—		1	0
Diósgyőr (loan)	2019–20	Nemzeti Bajnokság I	16	0	0	0	—		—		16	0
SC Cambuur (loan)	2021–22	Eredivisie	11	1	2	0	—		—		13	1
Újpest	2023–24	Nemzeti Bajnokság I	26	0	2	0	—		—		28	0
Wisła Kraków	2024–25	I liga	29	3	2	0	4	1	2 (Note: One appearance in I liga promotion play-offs, one appearance in Polish Super Cup)	0	37	4
Wisła Kraków II	2024–25	III liga, group IV	1	0	—		—		—		1	0
Anorthosis Famagusta	2025–26	Cypriot First Division	9	0	0	0	—		—		9	0
Career total			200	14	18	4	11	1	2	0	231	19

=== International ===
Appearances and goals by national team and year
National team	Year	Apps	Goals
Hungary
Hungary	2021	2	0
Total		2	0
