= Alan Uryga =

Polish footballer

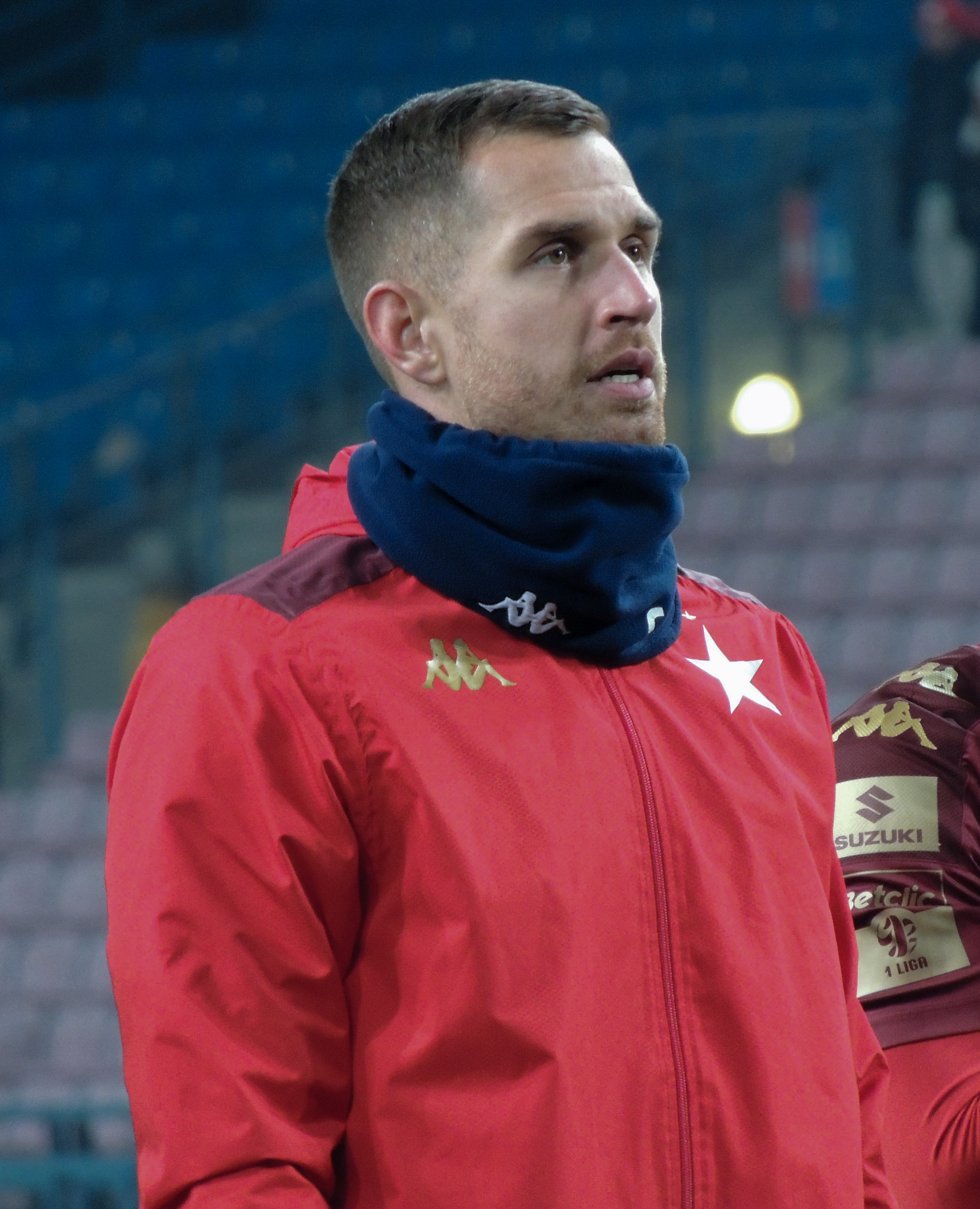
- Uryga with Wisła Kraków in 2026

Personal information
- Date of birth: 19 February 1994 (age 32)
- Place of birth: Kraków, Poland
- Height: 1.91 m (6 ft 3 in)
- Position: Centre-back

Team information
- Current team: Wisła Kraków
- Number: 6

Youth career
- Hutnik Kraków
- 2005–2011: Wisła Kraków

Senior career*
Years	Team	Apps	(Gls)
2012–2017	Wisła Kraków	94	(0)
2013–2016	Wisła Kraków II	19	(5)
2017–2021	Wisła Płock	116	(16)
2021–	Wisła Kraków	74	(7)

International career
2009	Poland U15	7	(2)
2009–2010	Poland U16	12	(0)
2010–2011	Poland U17	11	(1)
2011–2012	Poland U18	3	(0)
2012–2013	Poland U19	4	(0)
2014–2015	Poland U20	7	(0)
2015–2016	Poland U21	9	(0)
- * Club domestic league appearances and goals as of 11:05, 20 September 2026 (UTC)

Alan Uryga (born 19 February 1994) is a Polish professional footballer who plays as a centre-back for and captains Ekstraklasa club Wisła Kraków.

== Club career ==
Born in Kraków, Uryga made his debut for Wisła Kraków in the Ekstraklasa on 7 April 2012 in a match against Jagiellonia Białystok.

On 4 September 2017, he signed a contract with Wisła Płock.

On 31 January 2021, it was announced he signed a five-year contract with Wisła Kraków, effective from 1 July that year. He missed most of the 2021–22 season and the entirety of the following campaign due to multiple injuries, including a broken metatarsal bone and an ACL tear. On 2 May 2024, with Uryga as captain, Wisła won their fifth Polish Cup title, after a 2–1 victory over Pogoń Szczecin in the final.

== International career ==
Uryga was the captain of Poland U17s during the 2011 UEFA Under-17 Championship qualifying round. Uryga made his first appearance for under-18 team on 25 October 2011 in a friendly against Slovenia.

== Career statistics ==
As of match played 6 April 2026

Appearances and goals by club, season and competition
Club	Season	League			Polish Cup		Continental		Other		Total	
Club	Season	Division	Apps	Goals	Apps	Goals	Apps	Goals	Apps	Goals	Apps	Goals
Wisła Kraków	2011–12	Ekstraklasa	1	0	1	0	—		—		2	0
Wisła Kraków	2012–13	Ekstraklasa	10	0	1	0	—		—		11	0
Wisła Kraków	2013–14	Ekstraklasa	8	0	0	0	—		—		8	0
Wisła Kraków	2014–15	Ekstraklasa	31	0	1	0	—		—		32	0
Wisła Kraków	2015–16	Ekstraklasa	24	0	1	0	—		—		25	0
Wisła Kraków	2016–17	Ekstraklasa	20	0	2	0	—		—		22	0
Wisła Kraków	Total		94	0	6	0	—		—		100	0
Wisła Kraków II	2013–14	III liga, gr. G	13	5	—		—		—		13	5
Wisła Kraków II	2015–16	III liga, gr. G	6	0	—		—		—		6	0
Wisła Kraków II	Total		19	5	—		—		—		19	5
Wisła Płock	2017–18	Ekstraklasa	17	4	0	0	—		—		17	4
Wisła Płock	2018–19	Ekstraklasa	35	3	2	1	—		—		37	4
Wisła Płock	2019–20	Ekstraklasa	37	4	0	0	—		—		37	4
Wisła Płock	2020–21	Ekstraklasa	27	5	2	0	—		—		29	5
Wisła Płock	Total		116	16	4	1	—		—		120	17
Wisła Kraków	2021–22	Ekstraklasa	3	0	0	0	—		—		3	0
Wisła Kraków	2022–23	I liga	0	0	0	0	—		0	0	0	0
Wisła Kraków	2023–24	I liga	29	2	4	0	—		—		33	2
Wisła Kraków	2024–25	I liga	30	3	1	1	8 (Note: Four appearances in UEFA Europa League, four appearances and two goals in UEFA Conference League)	2	1 (Note: Appearance in Polish Super Cup)	0	40	6
Wisła Kraków	2025–26	I liga	3	0	0	0	—		—		3	0
Wisła Kraków	Total		65	5	5	1	8	2	1	0	79	8
Career total			294	26	15	2	8	2	1	0	318	30

== Honours ==
Wisła Kraków

- I liga: 2025–26
- Polish Cup: 2023–24
