= Jordi Sánchez =

Jordi Sánchez may refer to:

- Jordi Sánchez (actor) (born May 1964), Spanish actor and screenwriter
- Jordi Sànchez (politician) (born October 1964), Spanish politician
- Jordi Sánchez (footballer) (born 1994), Spanish association football player
- Jordi Sánchez (illustrator), Spanish author and illustrator
