= Olivier Sukiennicki =

Polish footballer

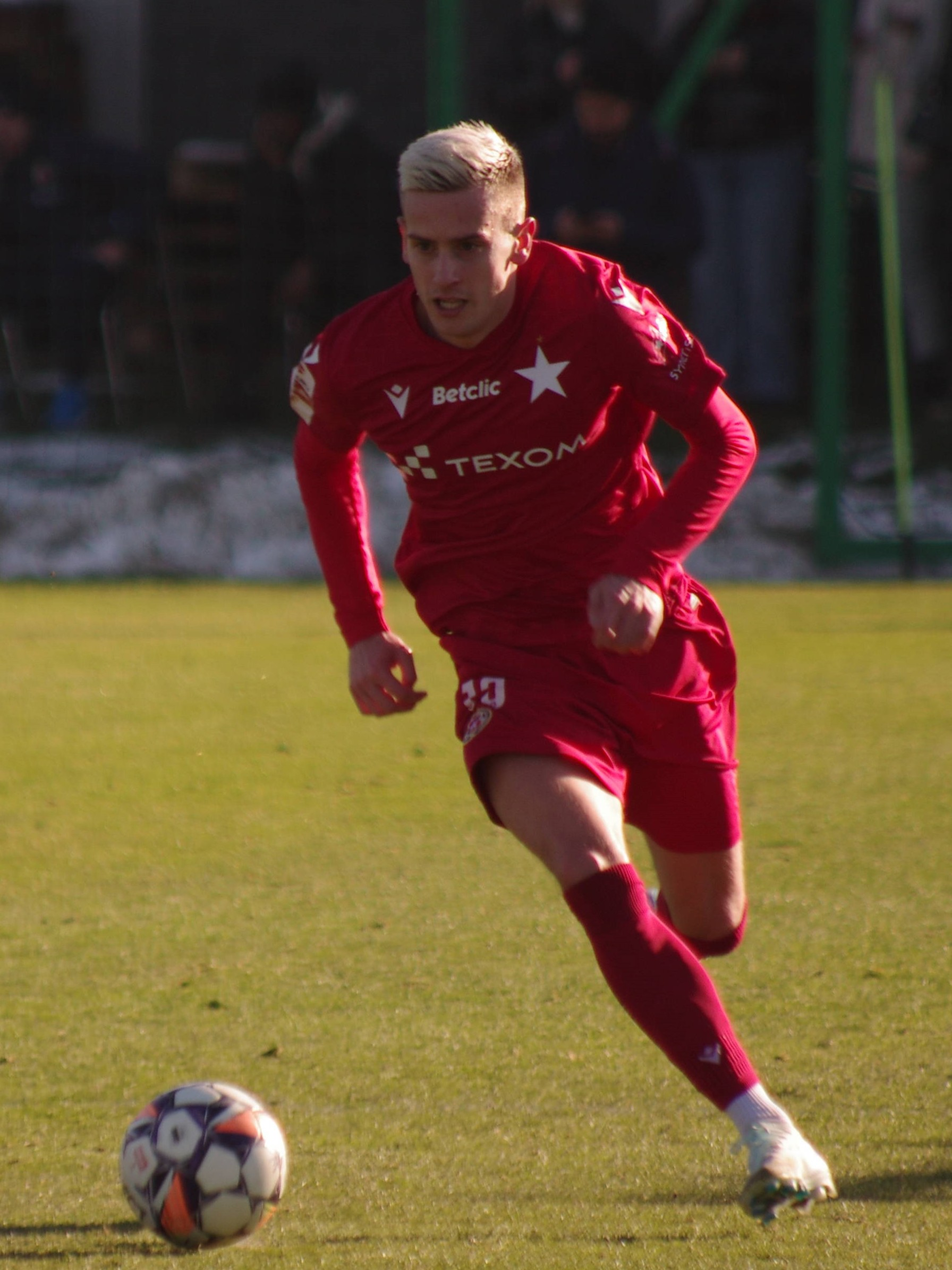
- Sukiennicki with Wisła Kraków in 2025

Personal information
- Full name: Olivier Mariusz Sukiennicki
- Date of birth: 25 May 2003 (age 23)
- Place of birth: Częstochowa, Poland
- Height: 1.78 m (5 ft 10 in)
- Position: Midfielder

Team information
- Current team: Wisła Kraków

Youth career
- Ajaks Częstochowa
- Raków Częstochowa
- 2015–2016: West Bromwich Albion
- 2016–2017: Manchester City
- 2017–2019: Stoke City
- 2019–2020: Bradford City

Senior career*
Years	Team	Apps	(Gls)
2020–2022	Bradford City	0	(0)
2022–2023	Raków Częstochowa II	10	(1)
2023	Raków Częstochowa	0	(0)
2023–2024	Stal Stalowa Wola	27	(1)
2024–	Wisła Kraków	32	(2)
2025–	Wisła Kraków II	8	(3)
2026	→ Odra Opole (loan)	12	(0)

International career
2021	Poland U19	2	(0)
- * Club domestic league appearances and goals as of 13:33, 26 May 2026 (UTC)

Olivier Mariusz Sukiennicki (born 25 May 2003) is a Polish professional footballer who plays as a midfielder for Ekstraklasa club Wisła Kraków.

== Club career ==
Born in Częstochowa, Sukiennicki began his career in his native Poland with hometown clubs Ajaks Częstochowa and Raków Częstochowa. He moved to England with his family in 2015, playing youth football for West Bromwich Albion, Manchester City, Stoke City and Bradford City.

He made his senior debut for Bradford City on 10 November 2020, alongside fellow youth team player Charlie Wood, appearing as an 80th minute substitute in the EFL Trophy in a 3–1 home defeat against Oldham Athletic.

In February 2021, he was named in the League Football Education's 'The 11' list, which recognises both football and non-footballing activities of young players.

In August 2021, he signed a one-year professional contract with Bradford City. He was released by the club at the end of the season.

In September 2022, Sukiennicki returned to Częstochowa to join the reserves team of his previous club Raków. He was promoted to the first team squad on 26 January 2023.

On 17 July 2023, he signed for Stal Stalowa Wola.

On 18 June 2024, Sukiennicki moved to I liga club Wisła Kraków on a two-year contract.

On 5 January 2026, Sukiennicki extended his deal with Wisła until June 2027 and moved on loan to fellow second-tier side Odra Opole for the remainder of the season.

== International career ==
In May 2021, he was called up to a training camp organised by the Poland under-19 national team. He played for the under-19s in September 2021.
