= Paweł Żyra =

Polish footballer (born 1998)

Personal information
- Date of birth: 7 April 1998 (age 28)
- Place of birth: Wałbrzych, Poland
- Height: 1.78 m (5 ft 10 in)
- Position: Midfielder

Team information
- Current team: Stal Stalowa Wola
- Number: 16

Youth career
- –2011: Górnik Wałbrzych
- 2011–2015: Zagłębie Lubin

Senior career*
Years	Team	Apps	(Gls)
2015–2020	Zagłębie Lubin	15	(0)
2019	→ Chojniczanka Chojnice (loan)	10	(0)
2020–2022	Bruk-Bet Termalica	38	(0)
2022–2023	Stal Mielec	19	(1)
2023–2025	Górnik Łęczna	65	(3)
2025–2026	Miedź Legnica II	11	(0)
2026–	Stal Stalowa Wola	0	(0)

International career
2014–2015	Poland U17	3	(0)
2015–2016	Poland U18	2	(0)
2015–2016	Poland U19	3	(0)
- * Club domestic league appearances and goals as of 13:48, 3 June 2026 (UTC)

Paweł Żyra (born 7 April 1998) is a Polish professional footballer who plays as a midfielder for II liga club Stal Stalowa Wola.

== Club career ==
On 4 August 2020, he signed with Bruk-Bet Termalica Nieciecza.

On 21 June 2022, Żyra joined Ekstraklasa club Stal Mielec on a two-year contract.

On 27 June 2023, he signed a two-year deal with I liga side Górnik Łęczna.

On 11 October 2025, Żyra was registered to play for Miedź Legnica's reserve team.

On 18 July 2026, he moved to II liga club Stal Stalowa Wola.

== Honours ==
Zagłębie Lubin II

- IV liga Lower Silesia West: 2016–17
- Polish Cup (Lower Silesia regionals): 2016–17
- Polish Cup (Legnica regionals): 2016–17
