= Łukasz Zwoliński =

Polish footballer (born 1993)

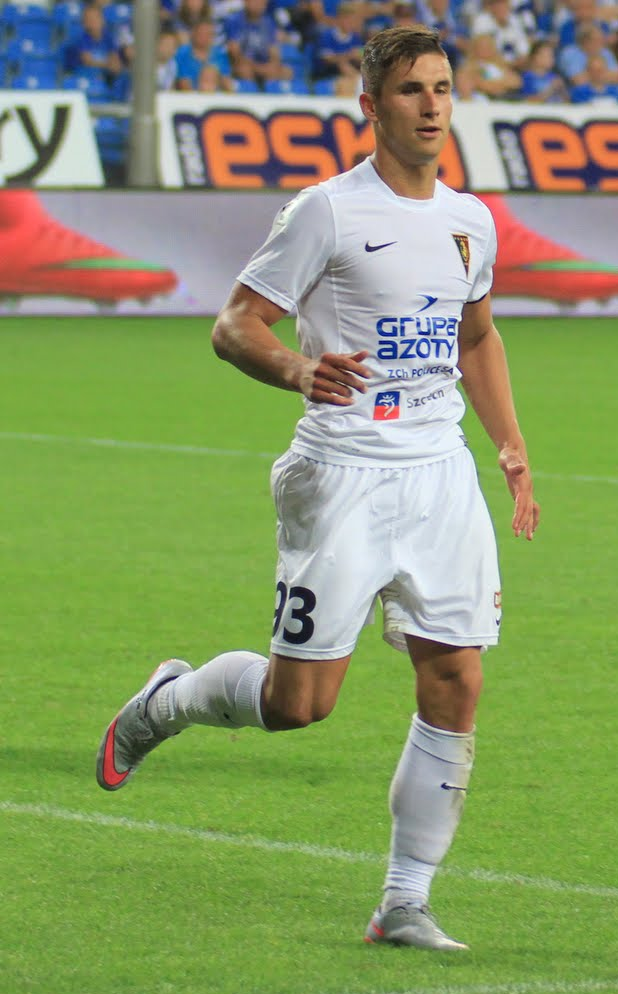
- Zwoliński with Pogoń Szczecin in 2015

Personal information
- Full name: Łukasz Piotr Zwoliński
- Date of birth: 24 February 1993 (age 33)
- Place of birth: Szczecin, Poland
- Height: 1.84 m (6 ft 1/2 in)
- Position: Forward

Team information
- Current team: East Bengal
- Number: 99

Youth career
- 2000: Pogoń Szczecin
- 2000–2002: Arkonia Szczecin
- 2002–2008: Stal Szczecin
- 2008–2010: Chemik Police
- 2010–2012: Pogoń Szczecin

Senior career*
Years	Team	Apps	(Gls)
2012–2018	Pogoń Szczecin	113	(22)
2012–2013	→ Arka Gdynia (loan)	11	(0)
2013–2014	→ Górnik Łęczna (loan)	22	(8)
2016–2017	→ Śląsk Wrocław (loan)	13	(0)
2018–2020	Gorica	50	(18)
2020–2023	Lechia Gdańsk	94	(36)
2023–2024	Raków Częstochowa	25	(5)
2024–2025	Wisła Kraków	35	(11)
2025–2026	Sakaryaspor	24	(4)
2026–	East Bengal	1	(1)

International career
2012–2014	Poland U20	6	(2)
- * Club domestic league appearances and goals as of 01:37, 24 October 2026 (UTC)

Łukasz Piotr Zwoliński (born 24 February 1993) is a Polish professional footballer who plays as a forward for Indian Super League club East Bengal.

== Club career ==
In February 2020, he joined Lechia Gdańsk on a three-and-a-half-year contract.

Following Lechia's relegation to I liga, on 22 May 2023, he signed a four-year deal with an extension option with defending Ekstraklasa champions Raków Częstochowa, effective from 1 July 2023.

On 15 July 2024, Zwoliński moved to I liga outfit Wisła Kraków on a two-year contract.

On 23 July 2025, Zwoliński was transferred to Turkish TFF 1. Lig side Sakaryaspor. After Sakaryaspor's relegation was confirmed, Zwoliński left the club in April 2026.

On 17 September 2026, Zwoliński signed for Indian Super League club East Bengal until June 2027.

== Career statistics ==
As of match played 18 April 2026

Appearances and goals by club, season and competition
Club	Season	League			National cup (Note: Includes Polish Cup, Croatian Cup, Turkish Cup)		Continental		Other		Total	
Club	Season	Division	Apps	Goals	Apps	Goals	Apps	Goals	Apps	Goals	Apps	Goals
Pogoń Szczecin	2011–12	I liga	2	0	—		—		—		2	0
Pogoń Szczecin	2012–13	Ekstraklasa	1	0	1	0	—		—		2	0
Pogoń Szczecin	2014–15	Ekstraklasa	33	12	1	1	—		—		34	13
Pogoń Szczecin	2015–16	Ekstraklasa	30	8	0	0	—		—		30	8
Pogoń Szczecin	2016–17	Ekstraklasa	20	1	4	2	—		—		24	3
Pogoń Szczecin	2017–18	Ekstraklasa	27	1	1	0	—		—		28	1
Pogoń Szczecin	Total		113	22	7	3	—		—		120	25
Arka Gdynia (loan)	2012–13	I liga	11	0	—		—		—		11	0
Górnik Łęczna (loan)	2013–14	I liga	22	8	0	0	—		—		22	8
Śląsk Wrocław (loan)	2016–17	Ekstraklasa	13	0	—		—		—		13	0
Gorica	2018–19	Prva HNL	33	14	0	0	—		—		33	14
Gorica	2019–20	Prva HNL	17	4	4	5	—		—		21	9
Gorica	Total		50	18	4	5	—		—		54	23
Lechia Gdańsk	2019–20	Ekstraklasa	13	7	3	0	—		—		16	7
Lechia Gdańsk	2020–21	Ekstraklasa	22	6	2	2	—		—		24	8
Lechia Gdańsk	2021–22	Ekstraklasa	32	14	2	2	—		—		34	16
Lechia Gdańsk	2022–23	Ekstraklasa	27	9	2	2	4 (Note: Appearances in UEFA Europa Conference League)	2	—		33	13
Lechia Gdańsk	Total		94	36	9	6	4	2	0	0	107	44
Raków Częstochowa	2023–24	Ekstraklasa	25	5	2	0	10 (Note: Eight appearances and three goals in UEFA Champions League, two appearances in UEFA Europa League)	3	1 (Note: Appearance in Polish Super Cup)	0	38	8
Wisła Kraków	2024–25	I liga	33	10	2	1	5 (Note: Two appearances in UEFA Europa League, three appearances and one goal in UEFA Conference League)	1	2 (Note: One appearance in I liga promotion play-offs, one appearance in Polish Super Cup)	0	42	12
Wisła Kraków	2025–26	I liga	1	1	—		—		—		1	1
Wisła Kraków	Total		34	11	2	1	5	1	2	0	43	13
Sakaryaspor	2025–26	TFF 1. Lig	24	4	1	0	—		—		25	4
East Bengal	2026–27	Indian Super League	0	0	0	0	0	0	0	0	0	0
Career total			386	104	25	15	19	6	3	0	433	125

== Honours ==
Individual

- Ekstraklasa Player of the Month: April 2015, June 2020
