= Marko Božić (Austrian footballer) =

Austrian footballer (born 1998)

Personal information
- Date of birth: 14 May 1998 (age 28)
- Place of birth: Vienna, Austria
- Height: 1.83 m (6 ft 0 in)
- Position: Midfielder

Team information
- Current team: Wisła Kraków
- Number: 17

Youth career
- 2005–2009: Admira Wacker
- 2009–2016: Rapid Wien

Senior career*
Years	Team	Apps	(Gls)
2016–2021	Rapid Wien II	35	(4)
2019	→ FC Stadlau (loan)	10	(1)
2021–2022	Radomlje	19	(3)
2022–2023	Frosinone	1	(0)
2022–2023	→ Maribor (loan)	31	(5)
2023–2025	Maribor	47	(9)
2025	Erzurumspor	2	(0)
2025–	Wisła Kraków	30	(9)
- * Club domestic league appearances and goals as of 13:15, 8 November 2026 (UTC)

Marko Božić (born 14 May 1998) is an Austrian professional footballer who plays as a midfielder for Ekstraklasa club Wisła Kraków.

== Career ==
On 31 January 2022, Božić left Radomlje and signed a two-and-a-half-year contract with Italian Serie B club Frosinone for an alleged transfer fee of €120,000. He made his Serie B debut for Frosinone on 15 March 2022 in a game against Crotone.

On 14 June 2022, Božić joined Maribor on a one-year loan deal with an option to buy. Maribor utilised the option to buy after the season, and he joined the club permanently on a contract until 2025.

In July 2025, Božić signed with TFF 1. Lig club Erzurumspor on a free transfer. On 23 August 2025, he was transferred to Polish club Wisła Kraków, signing a two-year contract.

== Honours ==
Wisła Kraków

- I liga: 2025–26
