= Giannis Kiakos =

Greek footballer

Personal information
- Full name: Ioannis Kiakos
- Date of birth: 14 February 1998 (age 28)
- Place of birth: Bamberg, Germany
- Height: 1.82 m (6 ft 0 in)
- Position: Left-back

Team information
- Current team: Krasava ENY
- Number: 77

Youth career
- –2016: FSV Erlangen-Bruck
- 2016–2017: Würzburger Kickers

Senior career*
| Years | Team | Apps | (Gls) |
| 2017–2018 | Würzburger Kickers II | 32 | (10) |
| 2018 | SpVgg Bayreuth | 7 | (0) |
| 2018–2019 | Meteora | 2 | (0) |
| 2019–2020 | Panionios | 6 | (0) |
| 2020–2021 | Volos | 21 | (1) |
| 2021–2022 | Ionikos | 26 | (4) |
| 2022–2024 | PAS Giannina | 28 | (1) |
| 2024–2025 | Wisła Kraków | 20 | (1) |
| 2024–2025 | Wisła Kraków II | 2 | (0) |
| 2025–2026 | Panionios | 17 | (2) |
| 2026– | Krasava ENY | 9 | (0) |
- * Club domestic league appearances and goals as of 7 November 2026

Giannis Kiakos (Greek: Γιάννης Κιάκος; born 14 February 1998) is a Greek professional footballer who plays as a left-back for Cypriot First Division club Krasava ENY.
