= Ángel Baena =

Spanish footballer (born 2000)

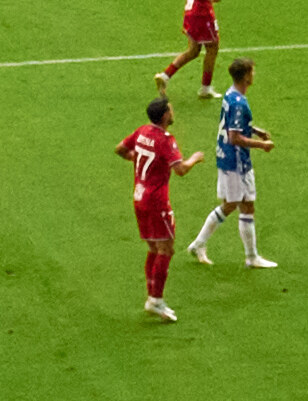
- Baena with Widzew Łódź in 2025

Personal information
- Full name: Ángel Baena Pérez
- Date of birth: 13 October 2000 (age 26)
- Place of birth: Santa Coloma, Spain
- Height: 1.75 m (5 ft 9 in)
- Position: Winger

Team information
- Current team: Sabadell
- Number: 10

Youth career
- Damm
- 2017–2019: Betis

Senior career*
Years	Team	Apps	(Gls)
2018–2022	Betis B	86	(6)
2022–2023	Lugo	35	(1)
2023–2025	Wisła Kraków	64	(5)
2025–2026	Widzew Łódź	35	(3)
2026–	Sabadell	11	(3)
- * Club domestic league appearances and goals as of 09:25, 16 November 2026 (UTC)

Ángel Baena Pérez (born 13 October 2000) is a Spanish professional footballer who plays as a right winger for Segunda División club Sabadell.

== Club career ==
Born in Santa Coloma de Gramenet, Barcelona, Catalonia, Baena joined Real Betis' youth setup in 2017, from CF Damm. He made his senior debut with the reserves on 14 April of the following year, coming on as a second-half substitute and scoring the equalizer in a 2–2 Segunda División B away draw against FC Jumilla.

On 17 December 2019, after finishing his formation, Baena renewed with the Verdiblancos until 2022. He was a regular starter during that campaign onwards, helping in the B's promotion to the third division and subsequent qualification to the newly created Primera División RFEF.

On 29 June 2022, Baena signed a three-year contract with Segunda División side CD Lugo. He made his professional debut on 15 August, starting in a 2–1 home loss against Albacete Balompié. Baena scored his first professional goal on 2 October 2022, netting his team's second in a 3–2 loss at UD Ibiza.

On 17 July 2023, he moved to Polish second division side Wisła Kraków on a two-year deal. He was named in the starting line-up for the 2023–24 Polish Cup final against Pogoń Szczecin on 2 May 2024, eventually won by Wisła 2–1 after extra time.

On 16 June 2025, Baena signed a two-year deal with Ekstraklasa club Widzew Łódź on a free transfer. On 1 September of the following year, he returned to his home country after agreeing to a two-year contract with CE Sabadell FC in the second division.

== Honours ==
Wisła Kraków

- Polish Cup: 2023–24
