= Frederico Duarte =

Portuguese footballer

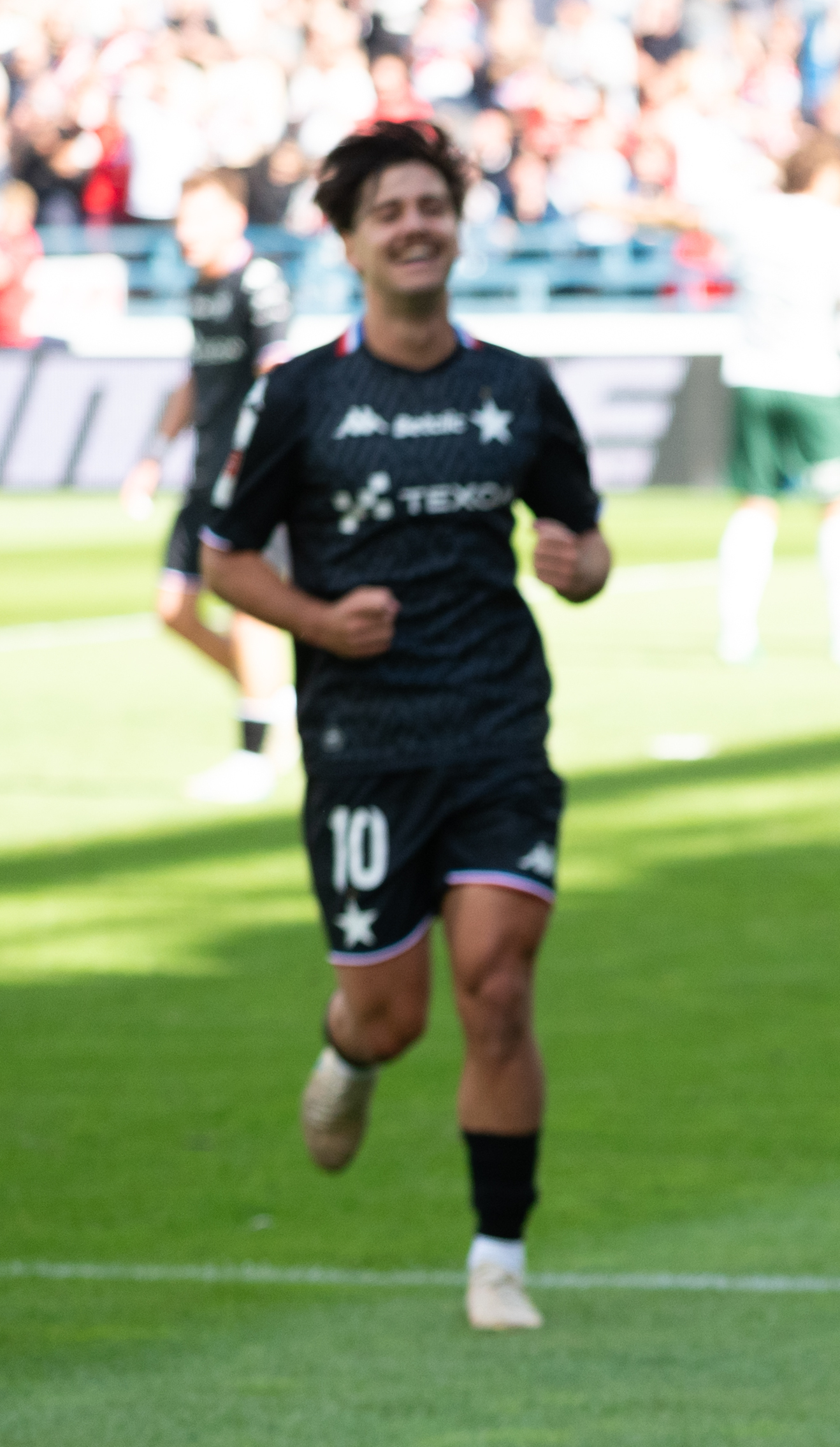
- Duarte in 2025 with Wisła Kraków

Personal information
- Full name: Frederico Fonseca Pires de Almeida Duarte
- Date of birth: 30 March 1999 (age 27)
- Place of birth: Lisbon, Portugal
- Height: 1.75 m (5 ft 9 in)
- Position: Left winger

Team information
- Current team: Wisła Kraków
- Number: 10

Youth career
- 2007–2017: Sporting
- 2017–2018: Sacavenense

Senior career*
Years	Team	Apps	(Gls)
2017–2018	Sacavenense	0	(0)
2018–2019	Vilafranquense	6	(0)
2019	→ Panetolikos (loan)	4	(1)
2019–2024	Panetolikos	123	(9)
2024–	Wisła Kraków	64	(14)
- * Club domestic league appearances and goals as of 13:41, 26 May 2026 (UTC)

Frederico Fonseca Pires de Almeida Duarte (born 30 March 1999) is a Portuguese professional footballer who plays as a left winger for Polish club Wisła Kraków.

== Career ==
Duarte made his Super League Greece debut for Panetolikos on 7 April 2019 in a game against Olympiacos.

On 26 June 2019, Panetolikos acquired his rights on a permanent basis from Vilafranquense. The young winger signed a contract until the summer of 2022.

On 24 July 2024, Duarte joined Polish I liga club Wisła Kraków on a two-year deal, with an option for another year.

== Honours ==
Wisła Kraków

- I liga: 2025–26
