= Bartosz Jaroch =

Polish footballer

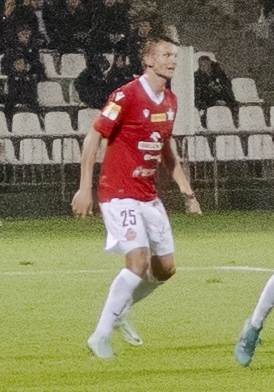
- Jaroch with Wisła Kraków in 2022

Personal information
- Date of birth: 25 January 1995 (age 31)
- Place of birth: Przemyśl, Poland
- Height: 1.85 m (6 ft 1 in)
- Position: Right-back

Team information
- Current team: Wisła Kraków
- Number: 25

Youth career
- Czuwaj Przemyśl
- –2011: Polonia Przemyśl

Senior career*
Years	Team	Apps	(Gls)
2011–2012	Polonia Przemyśl	14	(0)
2012–2014	Resovia	20	(0)
2014	Radomiak Radom	14	(1)
2014–2015	Olimpia Grudziądz	27	(5)
2015–2016	Podbeskidzie Bielsko-Biała	6	(0)
2016–2017	Znicz Pruszków	13	(0)
2017–2021	Podbeskidzie Bielsko-Biała	82	(11)
2021–2022	Resovia	47	(6)
2022–	Wisła Kraków	98	(8)

International career
	Poland U17	1	(0)
2013	Poland U18	4	(0)
2015	Poland U20	1	(0)
- * Club domestic league appearances and goals as of 13:43, 26 May 2026 (UTC)

Bartosz Jaroch (born 25 January 1995) is a Polish professional footballer who plays as a right-back for Ekstraklasa club Wisła Kraków. He is the son of former footballer Waldemar Jaroch and cousin of Gracjan Jaroch.

== Honours ==
Wisła Kraków

- I liga: 2025–26
- Polish Cup: 2023–24
