= James Igbekeme =

Nigerian footballer (born 1995)

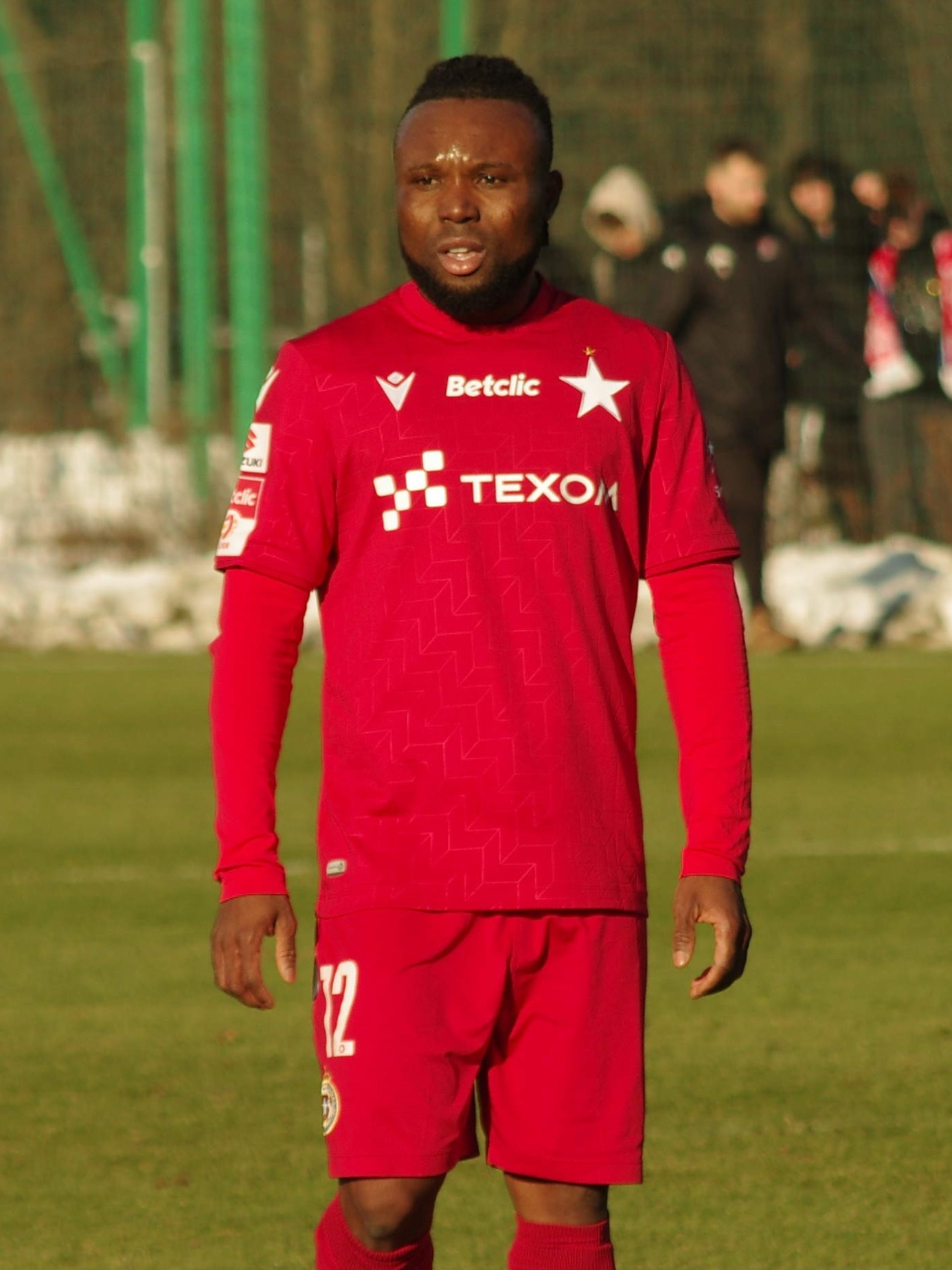
- Igbekeme with Wisła Kraków in 2025

Personal information
- Full name: James Omonigho Igbekeme
- Height: 1.70 m (5 ft 7 in)
- Positions: Midfielder; winger

Team information
- Current team: Wisła Kraków
- Number: 12

Youth career
- Ribeirão

Senior career*
Years	Team	Apps	(Gls)
2013–2015	Ribeirão	43	(2)
2015–2017	Oliveirense	55	(10)
2017–2018	Gil Vicente	32	(5)
2018–2023	Zaragoza	96	(4)
2022	→ Columbus Crew (loan)	23	(0)
2023	→ Wisła Kraków (loan)	14	(1)
2023–2024	Ponferradina	31	(1)
2024–2025	Wisła Kraków	28	(0)
2025–	Wisła Kraków	36	(3)
- * Club domestic league appearances and goals as of 20:38, 30 August 2026 (UTC)

James Omonigho Igbekeme is a Nigerian professional footballer who plays as a midfielder or winger for Polish Ekstraklasa club Wisła Kraków.

== Career ==
=== Portugal ===
Igbekeme left his hometown at the age of 18 to join Portuguese third division side G.D. Ribeirão in the 2013–14 season. In 2015, he moved to fellow league team U.D. Oliveirense.

In June 2017, Igbekeme signed for LigaPro side Gil Vicente F.C. He made his professional debut on 6 August, starting and scoring the winner in a 2–1 away defeat of FC Porto B.

On 28 October 2017, Igbekeme scored a brace in a 4–0 home routing of S.L. Benfica B. He finished the campaign with five goals in 32 appearances, but his side eventually suffered relegation.

=== Real Zaragoza ===
In June 2018, Igbekeme was transferred to Segunda División side Real Zaragoza for a reported €150,000, signing a four-year deal with the club. He made his debut in August on the first matchday of the season, a 2–1 home victory over Rayo Majadahonda. Igbekeme scored his first goal for Los Blanquillos on 8 September against Real Oviedo. On 18 June 2020, it was announced that Igbekeme had signed a contract extension, keeping him with Zaragoza until 2023. Initially a regular starter, he gradually started to feature more sparingly due to injuries and loss of form.

==== Loans ====
In January 2022, Igbekeme signed a contract extension and was subsequently loaned to Major League Soccer side Columbus Crew until December, with Columbus holding an option to exercise a permanent transfer. After completing one season stateside, his purchase option was declined and he returned to Spain. However, new Zaragoza manager Fran Escribá did not see a place for Igbekeme in the squad, and sent Igbekeme on loan to Polish side Wisła Kraków in late February 2023. Igbekeme would make 14 appearances and score one goal for the club.

=== Ponferradina ===
On 10 August 2023, he terminated his contract with Zaragoza and signed a contract with SD Ponferradina. On 12 November, Igbekeme scored a free-kick goal in his team's 1-0 win against Rayo Majadahonda.

=== Return to Wisła ===
On 19 August 2024, Igbekeme re-joined Wisła Kraków, this time permanently, on a deal until the end of the season. On 11 June 2025, Wisła announced Igbekeme would leave the club at the end of the month. After being linked with Bruk-Bet Termalica Nieciecza and Śląsk Wrocław, Igbekeme re-signed with Wisła on 16 July 2025.

== Style of play ==
Noted as a versatile player able to play multiple midfield positions as well as out wide on the wing, Igbekeme has described himself as a player who "works hard, enjoys putting in effort, and always likes to help the team."

== Honours ==
Wisła Kraków

- I liga: 2025–26
