= Igor Łasicki =

Polish footballer

Personal information
- Date of birth: 26 June 1995 (age 31)
- Place of birth: Wałbrzych, Poland
- Height: 1.84 m (6 ft 1/2 in)
- Position: Centre-back

Team information
- Current team: GKS Tychy
- Number: 26

Youth career
- Górnik Boguszów-Gorce
- Górnik Wałbrzych
- –2012: Zagłębie Lubin
- 2012–2014: Napoli

Senior career*
Years	Team	Apps	(Gls)
2014–2019	Napoli	1	(0)
2014–2015	→ Gubbio (loan)	32	(1)
2015–2016	→ Maceratese (loan)	4	(0)
2016	→ Rimini (loan)	8	(0)
2017	→ Carpi (loan)	4	(0)
2017–2019	→ Wisła Płock (loan)	47	(3)
2019–2022	Pogoń Szczecin	17	(0)
2019–2021	Pogoń Szczecin II	8	(0)
2022–2025	Wisła Kraków	61	(3)
2026–	GKS Tychy	12	(1)

International career
2011	Poland U16	3	(0)
2011–2012	Poland U17	15	(1)
2012	Poland U18	4	(0)
2012–2014	Poland U19	7	(0)
2014	Poland U20	3	(0)
2014–2017	Poland U21	5	(0)
- * Club domestic league appearances and goals as of 15:42, 26 May 2026 (UTC)

Igor Łasicki (born 26 June 1995) is a Polish professional footballer who plays as a centre-back for and captains II liga club GKS Tychy.

== Club career ==
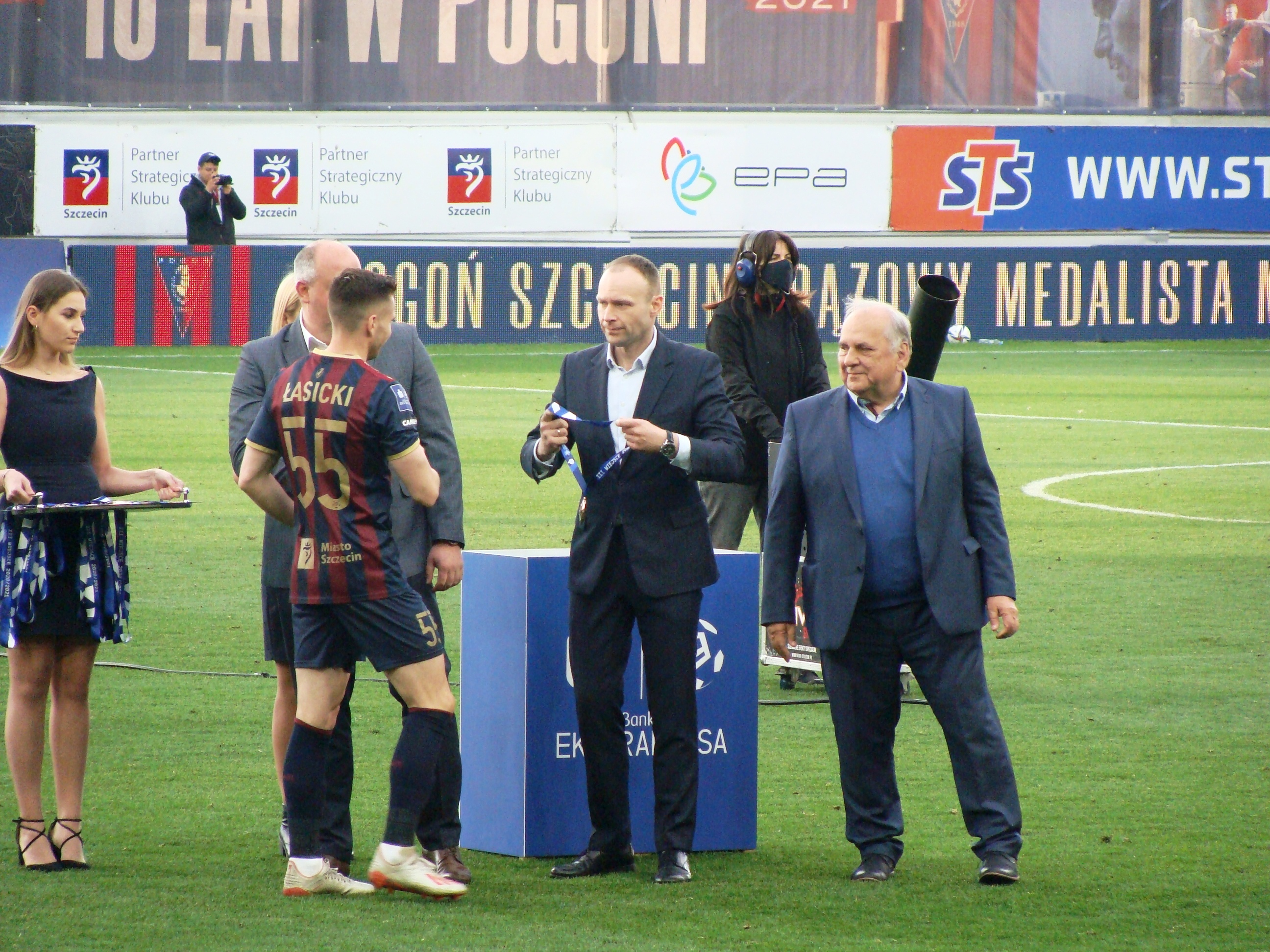
Łasicki with Pogoń Szczecin receiving a bronze medal at the end of the 2020–21 Ekstraklasa season.

Łasicki is a youth product of Zagłębie Lubin. In 2012, he joined Napoli, and initially played for their Primavera squad. On 18 May 2014 he made his first-team debut, coming on as a substitute for Jorginho against Hellas Verona.

On 19 July 2014, he was loaned to Serie C club Gubbio for the season.

On 7 July 2017, he was loaned to Ekstraklasa club Wisła Płock.

== Honours ==
Wisła Kraków

- Polish Cup: 2023–24
