= 2012–13 Bradford City A.F.C. season =

Bradford City
2012–13 season
- Co-chairmen: Mark Lawn; Julien Rhodes
- Manager: Phil Parkinson
- Stadium: Valley Parade
- League Two: 7th
- Play-offs: Winners (promoted)
- FA Cup: Second Round
- League Cup: Runners-up
- Football League Trophy: Area Semi-Final
- Top goalscorer: League: Nahki Wells (18); All: Nahki Wells (26)
- Highest home attendance: 23,971 vs. Arsenal, League Cup, 11 December
- Lowest home attendance: 2,951 vs. Northampton Town, FA Cup, 13 November
- Average home league attendance: 10,322
Home colours	Away colours	Third colours

The 2012–13 season was the 110th season in the history of Bradford City, 98th in the Football League and 100th in the league system of English football. Their finish in 18th place in the 2011–12 season resulted in the club's sixth successive season in League Two.

== Pre-season and friendlies ==
Bradford City started their season with a friendly against Northern Counties East League Premier Division side Tadcaster Albion; the League Two team were dominant throughout the game, eventually ending up as 7-1 victors. Phil Parkinson's men then travelled over for a pre-season tour of Ireland, where they would come up against Wexford Youths and Bray Wanderers.

Bradford returned to Yorkshire at the start of August to face local team Guiseley before heading to Greater Manchester to play Bury. The Bantams finished their pre-season with a match against city rivals Bradford Park Avenue.

Date	Opponents	H/A	Result F–A	Scorers	Attendance
21 July 2012	Tadcaster Albion	A	7–1	Hannah (2) 8', 33' (pen.), Davies 29', Hanson 35', Wells 51', Reid 70', Swain 88'	693
24 July 2012	Wexford Youths	A	4–0	Hanson (2) 18', 29', Hannah 20' (pen.), Wells 83'	n/a
28 July 2012	Bray Wanderers	A	2–1	Wells 22', Hannah 62'	n/a
1 August 2012	Guiseley FC	A	4–0	G. Jones 34', R. Jones 37', Wells (2) 62', 78'	n/a
4 August 2012	Bury	H	0–3		n/a
7 August 2012	Bradford Park Avenue	A	1–3	Thompson 23' (pen.)	945

== League Two ==
The fixtures for the 2012–13 League Two season were released on 18 June 2012.

Bradford City's first game of the season was away to Gillingham. Danny Kedwell scored just before half-time to give Gillingham a 1–0 advantage. Kedwell scored again in the 54th minute from a penalty after Garry Thompson committed a foul in his own box; however, Gillingham gave away a penalty not long after, which Nahki Wells converted. The game was wrapped up when Myles Weston made it 3–1 to ensure the Bantams got their league campaign off to a losing start. The Bantams' next match was at home to newly promoted Fleetwood Town; Bradford won the game 1–0 after Gary Jones crossed the ball in for James Hanson to head it into the net, giving the Bantams their first win of the season. City backed this up with a 5–1 win against AFC Wimbledon; Wells opened the scoring in the third minute by beating the Wimbledon keeper to a long ball. Curtis Haynes-Brown then sliced the ball into his own net to give the Bantams a 2–0 lead, this was extended in the 31st minute as Andrew Davies scored from a 40-yard free-kick. Wimbledon's Byron Harrison clawed a goal back through a header but a comeback was ruled out as Rory McArdle turned the ball into the net from close range with the assist coming from Davies. The rout was completed just on the stroke of half-time as Wells crossed a ball for Hanson to head in City's fifth goal of the game to take the three points.

The Bantams next game was against Rotherham, Bradford didn't have no luck in the game and were outplayed by the Millers who beat City 4–0. Bradford's poor form continued in their next game as a late Alan Connell goal secured a 1–1 draw with Accrington Stanley who went ahead early on. The Bantams got back to winning ways as they beat Barnet 3–0 with goals coming from James Hanson, Alan Connell and Andrew Davies which put City into 7th place. They backed up this domination with another good performance as James Hanson, Kyel Reid and Gary Jones all scored to ensure Bradford beat Morecambe 3–1. Bradford extended their winning run to 3 games as they beat Oxford United 2–0 with Andrew Davies and Nahki Wells netting for the Bantams. However Bradford ended the month with a 1–0 loss to Port Vale.

Bradford started October with a 0–0 draw against Rochdale before losing a scrappy game 4–3 against Dagenham & Redbridge with Nahki Wells scoring 2 goals (one being a penalty) and Alan Connell adding a late goal. Bradford gained a point against York City after going down 1–0 before Zavon Hines equalized to end the game 1–1. However the Bantams then beat Cheltenham 3–1, once again Wells was on the scoresheet scoring 2 goals whilst James Meredith added the third and Wells also scored the winner in a 1–0 victory against Northampton Town. October ended on a sour note as Bradford City lost 1–0 to Burton Albion.

After the loss at Burton the Bantams earned a point against Chesterfield as the game finished 0–0. Bradford got back to winning ways very soon though as Nahki Wells scored two goals against Aldershot to help City to a 2–0 and to go 4th in the league. However this victory was short lived as they were narrowly beaten 1–0 by Exeter City. Skipper Gary Jones showed some heart and desire in City's next game as he scored the only goal in a 1–0 win over Plymouth Argyle before Nahki Wells, Carl McHugh and James Hanson all scored for the Bantams in a 3–3 draw against Bristol Rovers to round off November.

December started well in the league for Bradford as Alan Connell scored a late goal against Torquay United to ensure the Bantams scraped a 1–0 win to take them back up to 4th in the table. With their confidence high after beating Arsenal in the cup Bradford travelled to Southend and were outclassed but managed to scrape a 2–2 draw thanks to a goal from Nahki Wells and an own goal for Luke Prosser. Bradford's next opponents were Accrington Stanley and goals from Garry Thompson and Alan Connell ensured that they came away with a 2–1 win. However 2012 was to end on a sour note as Rochdale beat the Bantams 4–2, the consolation goals coming from 2 Alan Connell penalties.

January was a mixed month for Bradford City. They drew to Morecambe 0–0 before losing to Barnet 2–0 and then Oxford United 2–1 (Nahki Wells scoring Bradford's only goal).

In February, it started off with a 2–2 draw against newly promoted Fleetwood Town with Nahki Wells and Ryan Dickson scoring however the Bantams then went on to lose against Gillingham 1–0 before getting their first win in nearly 2 months against Wycombe Wanderers, Nathan Doyle scored a brace and Will Atkinson also scored to help Bradford to a 3–0 win. Their league form continued to disappoint as Bradford lost 2–1 to AFC Wimbledon (Garry Thompson scoring) before rounding the month off with a 1–1 draw with Dagenham & Redbridge with James Hanson scoring a late equalizer.

In March, the Bantams came away with 2 wins, 4 draws and only 1 loss. It started with a 2–0 win against York City, striker James Hanson and midfielder Garry Thompson both scored late goals to help the Bantams come away with the 3 points. Bradford then drew 0–0 with Port Vale before a late Alan Connell penalty helped them to a 1–1 draw against Aldershot Town. The Bradford defence had shown some improvement as this was shown again in the next game as they kept Plymouth Argyle to a 0–0 draw. However, due to injuries Parkinson had to make some changes and this unsettled the side and they were outplayed and beaten 4–1 by Exeter City with Kyel Reid providing Bradford's only positive note. March finished with a 1–0 win against Wycombe Wanderers (thanks to a Garry Thompson goal) and a 2–2 draw with Southend United, Zavon Hines keeping the Bantams in the game before James Hanson secured the 1 point late in the game.

April was a very busy month for the Bantams as they crammed in fixtures due to their cup run to be runners up in the League Cup. The month started off brilliantly as the Bantams beat Torquay United 3–1 with the goals coming from Rory McArdle, Garry Thompson and James Hanson. Top scorer Nahki Wells was once again on target as City beat Northampton Town 1–0 just a few days later. Nahki Wells was on target twice (one penalty) to help City to a 4–1 victory over Bristol Rovers with Andrew Davies and Garry Thompson also scoring. City dropped the first points of the month as they could only get a 2–2 draw with Chesterfield, Nahki Wells and Ricky Ravenhill both providing the goals. The first loss of the month came just a few days later as the Bantams lost 2–0 to Rotherham United. However they secured the last playoff place as James Hanson scored to help Bradford to a 1–0 win against fellow playoff team Burton Albion. Bradford rounded their league campaign off with a 0–0 draw against Cheltenham Town which secured Bradford a 7th-place finish.

Date	Opponents	H/A	Result F–A	Scorers	Attendance	League position
18 August 2012	Gillingham	A	1–3	Wells 62' (pen.)	5,127	18th
21 August 2012	Fleetwood Town	H	1–0	Hanson 59'	9,224	12th
25 August 2012	AFC Wimbledon	H	5–1	Wells 3', Haynes-Brown 13' (o.g.), Davies 31', McArdle 37', Hanson 45'	9,436	4th
1 September 2012	Rotherham United	A	0–4		11,199	12th
8 September 2012	Accrington Stanley	A	1–1	Connell 83'	3,010	14th
15 September 2012	Barnet	H	3–0	Hanson 47', Connell 55', Davies 57'	9,566	7th
18 September 2012	Morecambe	H	3–1	Hanson 45', Reid 80', G. Jones 87'	9,054	5th
22 September 2012	Oxford United	A	2–0	Davies 52', Wells 68'	6,032	4th
29 September 2012	Port Vale	H	0–1		11,030	6th
2 October 2012	Rochdale	A	0–0		3,461	6th
6 October 2012	Dagenham & Redbridge	A	3–4	Wells (2) 55', 61' (pen.), Connell 84'	1,768	8th
13 October 2012	York City	H	1–1	Hines 59'	11,883	8th
20 October 2012	Cheltenham Town	H	3–1	Wells (2) 45' (pen.), 68', Meredith 83'	9,648	5th
23 October 2012	Northampton Town	A	1–0	Wells 53'	3,541	5th
27 October 2012	Burton Albion	A	0–1		2,791	5th
6 November 2012	Chesterfield	H	0–0		8,841	5th
10 November 2012	Aldershot Town	A	2–0	Wells (2) 28', 39'	2,143	4th
17 November 2012	Exeter City	H	0–1		10,434	7th
20 November 2012	Plymouth Argyle	H	1–0	G. Jones 21'	8,843	5th
24 November 2012	Bristol Rovers	A	3–3	Wells 28', McHugh 55', Hanson 68'	5,092	5th
8 December 2012	Torquay United	H	1–0	Connell 85'	9,347	4th
15 December 2012	Southend United	A	2–2	Wells 28', Prosser 64' (o.g.)	5,142	5th
26 December 2012	Accrington Stanley	H	2–1	Thompson 24', Connell 86'	11,181	5th
29 December 2012	Rochdale	H	2–4	Connell (2) 19' (pen.), 36' (pen.)	11,198	6th
1 January 2013	Morecambe	A	0–0		3,635	7th
5 January 2013	Barnet	A	0–2		2,317	8th
12 January 2013	Oxford United	H	1–2	Wells 14'	10,087	9th
2 February 2013	Fleetwood Town	A	2–2	Wells 45', Dickson 52'	3,577	10th
9 February 2013	Gillingham	H	0–1		10,887	12th
12 February 2013	Wycombe Wanderers	A	3–0	Doyle (2) 1', 83' (pen.), Atkinson 81'	3,068	10th
16 February 2013	AFC Wimbledon	A	1–2	Thompson 59'	4,320	11th
27 February 2013	Dagenham & Redbridge	H	1–1	Hanson 86'	10,006	12th
2 March 2013	York City	A	2–0	Hanson 77', Thompson 86'	5,678	12th
5 March 2013	Port Vale	A	0–0		4,281	10th
9 March 2013	Aldershot Town	H	1–1	Connell 90' (pen.)	10,397	11th
12 March 2013	Plymouth Argyle	A	0–0		5,609	11th
16 March 2013	Exeter City	A	1–4	Reid 79'	4,199	12th
19 March 2013	Wycombe Wanderers	H	1–0	Thompson 7'	8,047	11th
29 March 2013	Southend United	H	2–2	Hines 53', Hanson 83'	10,598	11th
1 April 2013	Torquay United	A	3–1	McArdle 7', Thompson 18', Hanson 48'	2,569	9th
6 April 2013	Northampton Town	H	1–0	Wells 23'	10,389	8th
9 April 2013	Bristol Rovers	H	4–1	Wells (2) 6', 22' (pen.), Davies 45', Thompson 57'	10,621	7th
13 April 2013	Chesterfield	A	2–2	Wells 36', Ravenhill 79'	7,290	7th
16 April 2013	Rotherham United	H	0–2		13,461	7th
20 April 2013	Burton Albion	H	1–0	Hanson 44'	13,235	7th
27 April 2013	Cheltenham Town	A	0–0		5,888	7th

Pos	Team	Pld	W	D	L	GF	GA	GD	Pts	Promotion, qualification or relegation
5	Cheltenham Town	46	20	15	11	58	51	+7	75	Qualification for League Two play-offs (Note: Four teams play for one spot and promotion to Football League One.)
6	Northampton Town	46	21	10	15	64	55	+9	73	Qualification for League Two play-offs
7	Bradford City (O, P)	46	18	15	13	63	52	+11	69	Qualification for League Two play-offs
8	Chesterfield	46	18	13	15	60	45	+15	67	
9	Oxford United	46	19	8	19	59	60	−1	65	

Updated to match(es) played on 27 April 2013. Source: BBC Sport
Rules for classification: 1) Points; 2) Goal difference; 3) Number of goals scored
(O) Play-off winners; (P) Promoted

=== Play-offs ===
After finishing seventh in League Two, City were entered into the end-of-season play-offs to determine who would get promoted to League One for the 2013–14 season. Bradford were against fourth-placed Burton Albion in the semi-finals and played them over two legs. The first leg did not start too well for the Bantams as Burton's Calvin Zola scored twice in the first half-hour to give Burton a 2–0 advantage early on. Bradford were awarded a penalty after Garry Thompson's shot was handled in the area, and Nahki Wells calmly slotted the penalty to make the score 2–1. A minute before half-time, Burton struck again after Alex McDonald crossed the ball to Robbie Weir, who scored at the near post to take Burton to a 3–1 lead. As they have done all season, Bradford came out with a little bit of fight and Thompson scored in the 74th minute with a thunderous drive after cutting inside from the right. The 3–2 loss meant that the Bantams would have to win by two or more goals in the second leg to reach the final.

The second leg started with Burton having a few early chances, but the Bantams were the first to strike. James Meredith delivered a cross that did not pose any particular threat to the Burton defence, but defender Marcus Holness tried to head it back to his own keeper, which resulted in Nahki Wells intercepting and poking the ball into the net to give the Bantams a 1–0 lead. Jon McLaughlin made some fine saves for Bradford to maintain their lead. In the second half, Wells once again came up with a great play, but this time to set up James Hanson, who scored in the bottom corner from the edge of the box to take City to a 2–0 lead. Burton hit back with a Jacques Maghoma penalty after Garry Thompson brought him down in the area, but the Bantams had the final word as McLaughlin produced a long free-kick that Wells controlled with ease before turning and shooting to score in the 57th minute to give Bradford a 3–1 lead. Some great defensive play kept Burton out and Bradford progress to the play-off final as this win gave them a 5–4 win on aggregate.

The final marked the second time that Bradford City had been to Wembley Stadium this season, after the 2013 Football League Cup Final. Last time, they went to enjoy the occasion as nobody expected them to win, but this time they went to get promoted. The play-off final would also mark the fifth time that Bradford faced Northampton Town during the season after playing them twice in the league and twice in the FA Cup. The writing was on the wall early doors as the Bantams dominated everything in the early stages of the game and Bradford scored first in the 15th minute after James Meredith's cross found Garry Thompson on the right hand side, Thompson then chipped the ball back across the face of the goal and James Hanson delicately headed the ball over Northampton keeper Lee Nicholls to give Bradford a 1–0 lead. The Bantams continued to press forward and their dominance was once again rewarded as Kyel Reid found Nathan Doyle from a cross who in turn put his own cross into the box for Rory McArdle to power a header into the back of the net to give the Bantams a 2–0 lead in the 19th minute. Once again Reid crossed the ball to find the in form Thompson who headed it back across the face of the goal, this time it was Nahki Wells who got on the end of it and blasted the ball into the goal to put the Bantams 3–0 up after only 28 minutes. Northampton brought on top scorer Adebayo Akinfenwa just after half-time but even he couldn't provide Northampton with a goal. The 3–0 win gave Bradford City their first promotion in 14 years and also lifted them out of League Two after seven consecutive years in the Football League's bottom divisions.

Date	Round	Opponents	H / A	Result F–A	Scorers	Attendance
2 May 2013	Semi-final; First leg	Burton Albion	H	2–3	Wells 38' (pen.), Thompson 74'	14,657
5 May 2013	Semi-final; Second leg	Burton Albion	A	3–1	Wells (2) 27', 57', Hanson 50'	6,148
18 May 2013	Final	Northampton Town	N	3–0	Hanson 15', McArdle 19', Wells 28'	47,127

== FA Cup ==
City entered the FA Cup at the First Round stage with the other League One and Two clubs. They were drawn against fellow League Two side Northampton Town. After drawing 1–1 at Northampton, Bradford secured a win in the replay by winning 4–2 on penalties after a very late Carl McHugh goal took the game to 3–3 in the final minute of extra time.

In the Second Round, the Bantams were drawn at home against League One side Brentford. A goal from James Hanson ensured a replay was to be played after the game finished at 1–1, but the Bantams were beaten in the replay, going down 4–2 after extra time, despite taking the lead in the 94th minute from an Alan Connell penalty.

Date	Round	Opponents	H / A	Result F–A	Scorers	Attendance
3 November 2012	Round 1	Northampton Town	A	1–1	Atkinson 32'	2,512
13 November 2012	Round 1 Replay	Northampton Town	H	3–3 (4–2p)	Atkinson 35', Wells 90' (pen.), McHugh 120'	2,951
30 November 2012	Round 2	Brentford	H	1–1	Hanson 70'	3,620
18 December 2012	Replay	Brentford	A	2–4 (a.e.t.)	Reid 34', Connell 94' (pen.)	2,643

== League Cup ==
City entered the League Cup at the First Round stage. They were drawn against League One side Notts County. The Bantams kept the score at 0–0 throughout normal time to force extra time, in which James Hanson netted the winner in the 95th minute. City were then drawn against Championship side Watford in the Second Round. Watford took a 1–0 lead, but the Bantams hit back with two very late goals from Kyel Reid and Garry Thompson to progress through.

On paper, it looked like City had an easier tie in the Third Round after being drawn against fellow League Two promotion rivals Burton Albion, but the Bantams were trailing 2–0 for the vast majority of the match until Nahki Wells scored twice in the last seven minutes to take the game to extra time. With five minutes left to play, defender Stephen Darby scored a goal from 30 yards out to secure a win for the Bantams. Following this escape, Bradford faced Wigan Athletic at the DW Stadium in a match that no one thought City would win; however, the resilient Bradford side kept the Premier League side scoreless and took the game to penalties. The Bantams won 4–2 on penalties to keep their League Cup dreams alive and also preserving their unbeaten penalty shoot-out run.

The Fifth Round draw was made and City were drawn at home against Premier League side Arsenal. The Bantams took an early lead through Garry Thompson, but it was the trio of Gary Jones, James Hanson and Nahki Wells who were troubling Arsenal. Thomas Vermaelen equalised with two minutes to go, taking the match to extra time. Bradford held on and beat the Gunners 3–2 on penalties, with Nathan Doyle, Gary Jones and Alan Connell scoring for Bradford, and Santi Cazorla (saved by Matt Duke), Marouane Chamakh (post) and Thomas Vermaelen (post) all missing their penalties for Arsenal.

Bradford were drawn against another Premier League side in the Semi-finals, this time Aston Villa. The first leg was at Valley Parade, while the second leg was at Villa Park. Bradford outplayed Villa in the first leg and in the 19th minute a Gary Jones corner was not cleared effectively and Zavon Hines got a shot away, however a deflection meant the ball landed to Nahki Wells who slotted past the keeper to make it 1–0. Matt Duke produced a lot top quality saves to keep Bradford in the lead before another Gary Jones cross found Rory McArdle who headed the ball past the keeper to make it 2–0 in the 77th minute. Andreas Weimann got himself a goal to give some hope to the Premier League side however it was the Bantams who had the final say as Gary Jones once again delivered a corner but this time Carl McHugh powered a header past Shay Given to give Bradford a 3–1 win going into the second leg. The first half of the second leg was dominated by Villa, however scrambled defence and some superb work from Matt Duke kept City in the game at halftime with Aston Villa having a 1–0 lead thanks to a Christian Benteke goal. The Bantams started to get a foothold in the game with Gary Jones yet again delivering a devastating corner which James Hanson headed past Shay Given to equalize. A late winner from Andreas Weimann ensure that Villa won the match 2–1 but it was Bradford City who progressed to the League Cup final as they beat Aston Villa 4–3 on aggregate. The final would be against either Chelsea or Swansea City.

A fairy tale ending was not to be as Premier League side Swansea City brutally took Bradford City to the cleaners to win the 2013 Football League Cup 5–0. Swansea dominated the game from the kick off and it was evident that the afternoon was going to be a long one from Bradford's point of view. Nathan Dyer grabbed an early goal in 16th minute after Matt Duke saved a shot from Michu but the ball re-bounded and Dyer pounced to slot the opening goal of the game to make it 1–0. Bradford held out for a good 20+ minutes after this goal but some good passing gave Michu some space and defender Carl McHugh didn't get tight enough to him and the Spanish player slotted home an accurate shot to extend the lead to 2–0. Shortly after halftime a great passing move between Wayne Routledge and Dyer opened up the Bradford defence and Dyer cut inside to curl a shot past Matt Duke to take the game away from the Bantams. To sum up Bradford's day keeper Duke was sent off in the 58th minute after bringing down Jonathan de Guzman in the box, de Guzman then slotted the penalty past replacement keeper Jon McLaughlin. De Guzman was on hand again as he slotted home a cross in the 90th minute to ensure that Bradford City were beaten 5–0 and Swansea lifted the League Cup as well as securing a spot in the 2013–14 Europa League.

Date	Round	Opponents	H / A	Result F–A	Scorers	Attendance
11 August 2012	Round 1	Notts County	A	1–0 (a.e.t.)	Hanson 95'	3,460
28 August 2012	Round 2	Watford	A	2–1	Reid 84', Thompson 90'	5,560
25 September 2012	Round 3	Burton Albion	H	3–2 (a.e.t.)	Wells (2) 83', 90', Darby 115'	4,178
30 October 2012	Round 4	Wigan Athletic	A	0–0 (4–2p)		11,777
11 December 2012	Round 5	Arsenal	H	1–1 (3–2p)	Thompson 16'	23,971
8 January 2013	Semi-final; First leg	Aston Villa	H	3–1	Wells 19', McArdle 77', McHugh 88'	22,245
22 January 2013	Semi-final; Second leg	Aston Villa	A	1–2	Hanson 55'	40,193
24 February 2013	Final	Swansea City	N	0–5		82,597

== Football League Trophy ==
City began their Football League Trophy campaign in the Second Round stage after receiving a bye in the First Round. They were drawn against League One side Hartlepool United. The Bantams, however, kept the higher league side to a 0–0 draw and took the game to penalties which Bradford won 3–2. City then faced League Two side Port Vale in the Area Quarter-final, where the Bantams came away with a 2–0 win thanks to goals from Ritchie Jones and Craig Forsyth. Their Football League Trophy dream ended, though, as they were taken apart in the Area Semi-final by a clinical Crewe Alexandra side (from League One), losing 4–1 with Kyel Reid scoring the Bantams only goal.

Date	Round	Opponents	H / A	Result F–A	Scorers	Attendance
10 October 2012	Round 2	Hartlepool United	A	0–0 (3–2p)		1,777
4 December 2012	Area Quarter-final	Port Vale	A	2–0	R. Jones 46', Forsyth 55'	2,786
16 January 2013	Area Semi-final	Crewe Alexandra	A	1–4	Reid 18'	2,935

== Squad statistics ==
No.	Pos.	Name	League		FA Cup		League Cup		League Trophy		Total		Discipline	
No.	Pos.	Name	Apps	Goals	Apps	Goals	Apps	Goals	Apps	Goals	Apps	Goals	Yellow card	Red card
1	GK	(Scotland) Jon McLaughlin	23	0	2	0	1(1)	0	3	0	32(1)	0	1	0
2	DF	(England) Stephen Darby	33(2)	0	3	0	8	1	2	0	49(2)	1	2	0
3	DF	(Australia) James Meredith	32	1	3	0	5	0	0(1)	0	43(1)	1	2	0
4	MF	(England) Ricky Ravenhill	21(1)	1	3	0	1	0	3	0	29(2)	1	6	1
5	DF	(England) Andrew Davies	27(1)	4	0	0	1(1)	0	1	0	31(2)	4	1	1
6	DF	(England) Luke Oliver	15	0	0	0	2	0	0	0	17	0	2	0
7	MF	(England) Kyel Reid	25(8)	2	1	1	1(2)	1	1	1	30(11)	5	3	0
9	FW	(England) James Hanson	38(4)	10	2(1)	1	6(2)	2	1(1)	0	50(8)	15	6	0
10	FW	(England) Andy Gray	6(1)	0	0	0	0	0	1	0	7(1)	0	1	0
11	MF	(England) Garry Thompson	26(15)	6	2(1)	0	6(1)	2	2	0	39(17)	9	3	0
12	GK	(England) Matt Duke	23(1)	0	2	0	7	0	0	0	32(1)	0	0	1
13	DF	(England) Dean Overson	0	0	0	0	0	0	0	0	0	0	0	0
14	MF	(England) Will Atkinson	26(16)	1	2(1)	2	8	0	1	0	38(19)	3	1	0
16	DF	(Republic of Ireland) Carl McHugh	12(4)	1	3	1	6	1	2(1)	0	23(5)	3	5	0
17	FW	(England) Alan Connell	8(22)	8	4	1	3(2)	0	3	0	18(26)	9	3	0
18	MF	(England) Gary Jones	38(1)	2	1(2)	0	7(1)	0	0(1)	0	49(5)	2	4	0
19	FW	(England) Adam Baker	0	0	0(2)	0	0(2)	0	0	0	0(4)	0	0	0
20	MF	(England) Zavon Hines	19(13)	2	2	0	5(1)	0	0(1)	0	26(15)	2	4	0
21	FW	(Bermuda) Nahki Wells	28(10)	18	0(3)	1	5(2)	3	0(2)	0	36(17)	26	6	0
22	DF	(England) Michael Nelson	12(1)	0	0	0	0	0	0	0	13(1)	0	0	0
23	DF	(Northern Ireland) Rory McArdle	38(2)	2	3(1)	0	8	1	1	0	53(3)	4	3	0
24	MF	(England) Nathan Doyle	34(3)	2	2	0	5(2)	0	1(2)	0	44(8)	2	10	1
30	MF	(Scotland) Scott Brown	0	0	3	0	0	0	0	0	3	0	0	0
31	MF	(England) Forrayah Bass	0	0	1	0	0	0	0	0	1	0	0	0
32	DF	(England) Connor Erangey	0	0	0	0	0	0	0	0	0	0	0	0
33	FW	(England) Louie Swain	0	0	0	0	0	0	0	0	0	0	0	0
34	FW	(England) Nathan Curtis	0	0	0(1)	0	0	0	0	0	0(1)	0	0	0
35	MF	(England) Calum Hepworth	0	0	0	0	0	0	0	0	0	0	0	0
-	FW	(England) Ross Hannah	0(1)	0	0	0	0	0	0	0	0(1)	0	0	0
-	MF	(England) Ritchie Jones	2(2)	0	2	0	0(1)	0	3	1	7(3)	1	0	0
-	DF	(England) Ryan Dickson	3(2)	1	0	0	0	0	1	0	4(2)	1	0	0
-	MF	(Scotland) Craig Forsyth	5(2)	0	0	0	0	0	1	1	6(2)	1	0	0
-	DF	(Republic of Ireland) John Egan	4	0	0	0	0	0	0	0	4	0	0	0
-	DF	(England) Tom Naylor	4(1)	0	0	0	0	0	2	0	6(1)	0	0	0
-	MF	(England) Blair Turgott	0(4)	0	2	0	0(3)	0	2	0	4(7)	0	0	0
-	DF	(Australia) Curtis Good	2(1)	0	1	0	3	0	2	0	8(1)	0	0	0
—	–	Own goals	–	2	–	0	–	0	–	0	–	2	–	–

Statistics accurate as of 19 May 2013
