= 2011–12 Bradford City A.F.C. season =

Bradford City A.F.C.
2011–12 season
- Chairman: Mark Lawn; Julian Rhodes
- Manager: Peter Jackson(until 25 August 2011); Colin Cooper (caretaker until 29 August 2011); Phil Parkinson
- League Two: 18th
- FA Cup: 3rd Round (vs. Watford)
- League Cup: 1st Round (vs. Leeds United)
- Football League Trophy: Area Semi Final (North) (vs. Oldham Athletic)
- Top goalscorer: League: James Hanson (13); All: James Hanson (14)
- Highest home attendance: 17,014 vs Hereford United (League Two)
- Lowest home attendance: 3,432 vs AFC Wimbledon (FA Cup)
- Average home league attendance: 10,491
| Home colours | Away colours | Third colours |

The 2011–12 season was the 109th season in Bradford City A.F.C.'s history, their 97th in the Football League and 99th in the league system of English football. Their 18th-place finish in 2010–11 season means this season will be their fifth successive season in League Two.

In September 2011, the team began a link with American amateur side Palmetto FC Bantams.

== Pre-season friendlies ==
| Date | Opponents | H / A | Result F–A | Scorers | Attendance |
|---|---|---|---|---|---|
| 13 July 2011 | Guiseley | A | 7–1 | Rodney 19', Flynn 24', Wells (2) 36', 55', Green 38', Stephenson 51', Kerr 66' | 1,125 |
| 15 July 2011 | Matlock Town | A | 1–1 | Hanson 34' | 364 |
| 19 July 2011 | Guiseley | A | 3–2 | Syers 27', Stewart 48', Hanson 56' | n/a |
| 22 July 2011 | Bradford Park Avenue | A | 2–3 | Rodney (2) 23', 38' | n/a |
| 24 July 2011 | Bolton Wanderers | H | 1–4 | Rodney 73' | 2,349 |
| 27 July 2011 | Hull City | A | 1–3 | Stewart 65' | n/a |
| 30 July 2011 | Carlisle United | H | 1–3 | Stewart 2' | 1,107 |

== League Two ==
=== League table ===
| Pos | Team | Pld | W | D | L | GF | GA | GD | Pts |
|---|---|---|---|---|---|---|---|---|---|
| 16 | AFC Wimbledon | 46 | 15 | 9 | 22 | 62 | 78 | −16 | 54 |
| 17 | Burton Albion | 46 | 14 | 12 | 20 | 54 | 81 | −27 | 54 |
| 18 | Bradford City | 46 | 12 | 14 | 20 | 54 | 59 | −5 | 50 |
| 19 | Dagenham & Redbridge | 46 | 14 | 8 | 24 | 50 | 72 | −22 | 50 |
| 20 | Northampton Town | 46 | 12 | 12 | 22 | 56 | 79 | −23 | 48 |

Updated to match(es) played on 5 May 2012. Source: BBC Sport
Rules for classification: 1) Points; 2) Goal difference; 3) Number of goals scored

=== Matches ===
| Date | Opponents | H/A | Result F–A | Scorers | Attendance | League position |
|---|---|---|---|---|---|---|
| 6 August 2011 | Aldershot Town | H | 1–2 | Hanson 90+3' | 10,205 | 18th |
| 13 August 2011 | Oxford United | A | 1–1 | Hannah 78' | 6,523 | 16th |
| 16 August 2011 | Accrington Stanley | A | 0–1 | | 2,652 | 19th |
| 20 August 2011 | Dagenham & Redbridge | H | 0–1 | | 9,594 | 21st |
| 27 August 2011 | Barnet | H | 4–2 | Hanson (2) 16', 54', Branston 49', Wells 90' | 9,656 | 17th |
| 3 September 2011 | Morecambe | A | 1–1 | Hannah 90+3' | 4,025 | 16th |
| 10 September 2011 | Bristol Rovers | H | 2–2 | Flynn (2) 64' (pen.), 90+3' (pen.) | 10,023 | 16th |
| 13 September 2011 | Port Vale | A | 2–3 | Devitt 24', Jones 50' | 4,769 | 18th |
| 17 September 2011 | Crawley Town | A | 1–3 | Reid 12' | 2,479 | 19th |
| 24 September 2011 | AFC Wimbledon | H | 1–2 | Flynn 26' (pen.) | 10,255 | 19th |
| 1 October 2011 | Burton Albion | A | 2–2 | Reid 6', Hanson 16' | 2,925 | 18th |
| 8 October 2011 | Torquay United | H | 1–0 | Fagan 38' | 11,738 | 16th |
| 15 October 2011 | Hereford United | A | 0–2 | | 2,462 | 19th |
| 22 October 2011 | Northampton Town | H | 2–1 | Fagan 64' (pen.), Hanson 69' | 9,925 | 16th |
| 25 October 2011 | Macclesfield Town | A | 0–1 | | 2,373 | 20th |
| 29 October 2011 | Swindon Town | A | 0–0 | | 7,701 | 21st |
| 5 November 2011 | Cheltenham Town | H | 0–1 | | 9,645 | 21st |
| 19 November 2011 | Rotherham United | H | 2–3 | Mitchell 34', Flynn 90' (pen.) | 10,551 | 22nd |
| 26 November 2011 | Gillingham | A | 0–0 | | 7,074 | 21st |
| 10 December 2011 | Plymouth Argyle | H | 1–1 | Hanson 86' | 10,143 | 21st |
| 16 December 2011 | Southend United | A | 1–0 | Oliver 88' | 5,526 | 20th |
| 26 December 2011 | Crewe Alexandra | H | 3–0 | Wells 2', Hanson (2) 64', 84' | 11,060 | 19th |
| 31 December 2011 | Shrewsbury Town | H | 3–1 | Hanson 24', Wells 29', Fagan 49' | 10,567 | 17th |
| 2 January 2012 | Rotherham United | A | 0–3 | | 5,368 | 18th |
| 14 January 2012 | Morecambe | H | 2–2 | Ravenhill 60', Seip 89' | 10,065 | 18th |
| 21 January 2012 | Burton Albion | H | 1–1 | Davies 43' | 9,744 | 19th |
| 28 January 2012 | Bristol Rovers | A | 1–2 | Davies 72' | 6,164 | 19th |
| 14 February 2012 | Port Vale | H | 1–1 | Davies 90+5' | 12,194 | 19th |
| 18 February 2012 | Torquay United | A | 2–1 | Fagan 17', Reid 20' | 2,566 | 18th |
| 25 February 2012 | Hereford United | H | 1–1 | Syers 88' | 17,014 | 19th |
| 28 February 2012 | Barnet | A | 4–0 | Fagan 17', Atkinson 37', Reid 58', Wells 88' | 1,509 | 18th |
| 3 March 2012 | Dagenham & Redbridge | A | 0–1 | | 3,041 | 19th |
| 6 March 2012 | Accrington Stanley | H | 1–1 | Wells 50' | 9,379 | 19th |
| 10 March 2012 | Oxford United | H | 2–1 | Fagan 57' (pen.), Hanson 67' | 10,059 | 17th |
| 13 March 2012 | AFC Wimbledon | A | 1–3 | Balkestein 36' (o.g.) | 4,064 | 18th |
| 17 March 2012 | Aldershot Town | A | 0–1 | | 2,763 | 19th |
| 20 March 2012 | Crewe Alexandra | A | 0–1 | | 3,556 | 20th |
| 24 March 2012 | Gillingham | H | 2–2 | Wells 71', Hanson 84' | 9,858 | 20th |
| 27 March 2012 | Crawley Town | H | 1–2 | Dagnall 72' | 9,773 | 21st |
| 31 March 2012 | Plymouth Argyle | A | 0–1 | | 6,933 | 21st |
| 6 April 2012 | Southend United | H | 2–0 | Hanson 38', Fagan 54' (pen.) | 10,859 | 20th |
| 9 April 2012 | Shrewsbury Town | A | 0–1 | | 6,272 | 21st |
| 14 April 2012 | Northampton Town | A | 3–1 | Wells (3) 11', 39', 52' | 5,060 | 19th |
| 21 April 2012 | Macclesfield Town | H | 1–0 | Hanson 65' | 10,106 | 18th |
| 28 April 2012 | Cheltenham Town | A | 1–3 | Wells 8' | 3,930 | 19th |
| 5 May 2012 | Swindon Town | H | 0–0 | | 11,576 | 18th |

== FA Cup ==
| Date | Round | Opponents | H / A | Result F–A | Scorers | Attendance |
|---|---|---|---|---|---|---|
| 12 November 2011 | Round 1 | Rochdale | H | 1–0 | Wells 84' | 3,579 |
| 3 December 2011 | Round 2 | AFC Wimbledon | H | 3–1 | Hannah 9', Bush 14' (o.g.), Fagan 70' (pen.) | 3,432 |
| 7 January 2012 | Round 3 | Watford | A | 2–4 | Hanson 8', Wells 88' | 8,935 |

== League Cup ==
| Date | Round | Opponents | H / A | Result F–A | Scorers | Attendance |
|---|---|---|---|---|---|---|
| 9 August 2011 | Round 1 | Leeds United | A | 2–3 | Compton 31', Flynn 57' | 17,667 |

== Football League Trophy ==
| Date | Round | Opponents | H / A | Result F–A | Scorers | Attendance |
|---|---|---|---|---|---|---|
| 30 August 2011 | Round 1 | Sheffield Wednesday | H | 0–0 (3–1p) | | 3,519 |
| 4 October 2011 | Round 2 | Huddersfield Town | A | 2–2 (4–3p) | Kay 55' (o.g.), Oliver 64' | 10,489 |
| 8 November 2011 | Area Quarter-Final | Sheffield United | A | 1–1 (6–5p) | Flynn 40' | 5,692 |
| 6 December 2011 | Area Semi-Final | Oldham Athletic | A | 0–2 | | 5,697 |

== Squad statistics ==
| No. | Pos. | Name | League | | FA Cup | | League Cup | | League Trophy | | Total | | Discipline | |
| No. | Pos. | Name | Apps | Goals | Apps | Goals | Apps | Goals | Apps | Goals | Apps | Goals | Yellow card | Red card |
|---|---|---|---|---|---|---|---|---|---|---|---|---|---|---|
| 1 | GK | (Scotland) Jon McLaughlin | 23 | 0 | 3 | 0 | 0 | 0 | 2 | 0 | 28 | 0 | 0 | 1 |
| 2 | DF | (England) Simon Ramsden | 16(1) | 0 | 1(1) | 0 | 0 | 0 | 1 | 0 | 18(2) | 0 | 1 | 0 |
| 3 | DF | (England) Matt Fry | 5(1) | 0 | 0 | 0 | 0 | 0 | 0 | 0 | 5(1) | 0 | 2 | 0 |
| 4 | MF | (Wales) Michael Flynn | 27(3) | 4 | 2 | 0 | 1 | 1 | 3 | 1 | 33(3) | 6 | 8 | 1 |
| 5 | MF | (England) Guy Branston | 15(1) | 1 | 0 | 0 | 1 | 0 | 2 | 0 | 18(1) | 1 | 1 | 0 |
| 6 | DF | (England) Luke Oliver | 39 | 1 | 3 | 0 | 0 | 0 | 4 | 1 | 46 | 2 | 4 | 1 |
| 7 | FW | (Scotland) Mark Stewart | 5(7) | 0 | 0 | 0 | 1 | 0 | 2 | 0 | 8(7) | 0 | 2 | 0 |
| 8 | MF | (England) Ritchie Jones | 31(1) | 1 | 2 | 0 | 0(1) | 0 | 3 | 0 | 36(2) | 1 | 6 | 0 |
| 9 | FW | (England) James Hanson | 36(3) | 13 | 2(1) | 1 | 1 | 0 | 2(1) | 0 | 41(5) | 14 | 3 | 0 |
| 10 | FW | (England) Ross Hannah | 4(13) | 2 | 2(1) | 1 | 0(1) | 0 | 2(2) | 0 | 8(17) | 3 | 0 | 0 |
| 11 | FW | (England) Deane Smalley | 7(6) | 0 | 0 | 0 | 0 | 0 | 0 | 0 | 7(6) | 0 | 1 | 0 |
| 12 | DF | (England) Steve Williams | 1 | 0 | 1 | 0 | 1 | 0 | 0 | 0 | 3 | 0 | 1 | 0 |
| 14 | MF | (England) Ricky Ravenhill | 25(1) | 1 | 2 | 0 | 0 | 0 | 0 | 0 | 27(1) | 1 | 10 | 0 |
| 15 | DF | (England) Lewis Hunt | 0(1) | 0 | 0 | 0 | 0 | 0 | 0 | 0 | 0(1) | 0 | 0 | 0 |
| 16 | MF | (Scotland) Chris Mitchell | 10(1) | 1 | 1 | 0 | 1 | 0 | 4 | 0 | 16(1) | 1 | 1 | 0 |
| 18 | MF | (England) Luke Dean | 0(1) | 0 | 0(2) | 0 | 0 | 0 | 1 | 0 | 1(3) | 0 | 0 | 0 |
| 19 | FW | (England) Adam Baker | 0(1) | 0 | 0 | 0 | 0 | 0 | 0 | 0 | 0(1) | 0 | 0 | 0 |
| 21 | FW | (Bermuda) Nahki Wells | 18(15) | 10 | 1(2) | 2 | 0 | 0 | 1 | 0 | 20(17) | 12 | 1 | 0 |
| 22 | MF | (England) Lee Bullock | 14(5) | 0 | 0(1) | 0 | 0 | 0 | 0 | 0 | 14(6) | 0 | 4 | 0 |
| 23 | MF | (England) Dave Syers | 8(10) | 1 | 0 | 0 | 1 | 0 | 0 | 0 | 9(10) | 1 | 1 | 1 |
| 24 | DF | (England) Rob Kozluk | 17 | 0 | 0 | 0 | 0 | 0 | 0 | 0 | 17 | 0 | 5 | 1 |
| 26 | MF | (Northern Ireland) Michael Bryan | 5(3) | 0 | 0 | 0 | 0 | 0 | 0(1) | 0 | 5(4) | 0 | 0 | 0 |
| 28 | DF | (England) Robbie Threlfall | 16 | 0 | 1 | 0 | 1 | 0 | 2 | 0 | 20 | 0 | 0 | 0 |
| 31 | GK | (Sweden) Oscar Jansson | 1 | 0 | 0 | 0 | 1 | 0 | 1 | 0 | 3 | 0 | 0 | 0 |
| 32 | MF | (England) Kyle Reid | 32(5) | 4 | 1 | 0 | 0 | 0 | 0(2) | 0 | 33(7) | 4 | 5 | 0 |
| 34 | GK | (England) Matt Duke | 18 | 0 | 0 | 0 | 0 | 0 | 1 | 0 | 19 | 0 | 1 | 0 |
| 35 | MF | (Republic of Ireland) Jamie Devitt | 5(2) | 1 | 1 | 0 | 0 | 0 | 0(1) | 0 | 6(3) | 1 | 1 | 0 |
| 36 | DF | (Netherlands) Marcel Seip | 23 | 1 | 2 | 0 | 0 | 0 | 2 | 0 | 27 | 1 | 2 | 0 |
| 37 | DF | (England) Adam Reed | 4 | 0 | 0 | 0 | 0 | 0 | 0 | 0 | 4 | 0 | 2 | 0 |
| 38 | DF | (England) Andrew Davies | 26 | 3 | 2 | 0 | 0 | 0 | 1(1) | 0 | 29(1) | 3 | 3 | 3 |
| 39 | FW | (England) Craig Fagan | 29(2) | 7 | 2 | 1 | 0 | 0 | 1(1) | 0 | 32(3) | 8 | 6 | 1 |
| 41 | GK | (Denmark) Martin Hansen | 4 | 0 | 0 | 0 | 0 | 0 | 0 | 0 | 4 | 0 | 0 | 0 |
| - | DF | (England) Luke O'Brien | 3(6) | 0 | 1 | 0 | 0 | 0 | 2(1) | 0 | 6(7) | 0 | 1 | 0 |
| - | MF | (England) Jack Compton | 9(5) | 0 | 1(1) | 0 | 1 | 1 | 4 | 0 | 15(6) | 1 | 1 | 0 |
| - | DF | (England) Liam Moore | 16(1) | 0 | 1 | 0 | 1 | 0 | 3 | 0 | 21(1) | 0 | 2 | 0 |
| - | MF | (England) Charlie Taylor | 1(2) | 0 | 1 | 0 | 0 | 0 | 0 | 0 | 2(2) | 0 | 0 | 0 |
| - | MF | (England) Andy Howarth | 2(1) | 0 | 0 | 0 | 0 | 0 | 0 | 0 | 2(1) | 0 | 0 | 0 |
| - | FW | (England) Chris Dagnall | 5(2) | 1 | 0 | 0 | 0 | 0 | 0 | 0 | 5(2) | 1 | 0 | 0 |
| - | MF | (England) Will Atkinson | 6(6) | 1 | 0 | 0 | 0 | 0 | 0 | 0 | 6(6) | 1 | 1 | 0 |
| - | FW | (England) Nialle Rodney | 0(5) | 0 | 0 | 0 | 0(1) | 0 | 0(1) | 0 | 0(7) | 0 | 1 | 0 |
| - | – | Own goals | – | 1 | – | 1 | – | 0 | – | 1 | – | 3 | – | – |

Statistics accurate as of 5 May 2012

== Transfers ==
Players transferred in
| Date | Pos. | Name | Previous club | Fee | Ref. |
|---|---|---|---|---|---|
| 13 June 2011 | DF | (England) Guy Branston | (England) Torquay United | Free | |
| 1 July 2011 | MF | (Scotland) Chris Mitchell | (Scotland) Falkirk | Free | |
| 1 July 2011 | FW | (Scotland) Mark Stewart | (Scotland) Falkirk | Free (Bosman) | |
| 6 July 2011 | DF | (Scotland) Scott Brown | (Scotland) Clyde | Free Transfer | |
| 8 July 2011 | DF | (England) Patrick Lacey | (England) Sheffield Wednesday | Free | |
| 13 July 2011 | MF | (England) Ritchie Jones | (England) Oldham Athletic | Free | |
| 13 July 2011 | FW | (England) Nialle Rodney | (England) Nottingham Forest | Free | |
| 14 July 2011 | DF | (England) Andrew Burns | (England) Bolton Wanderers | Free | |
| 22 July 2011 | FW | (Bermuda) Nahki Wells | (England) Carlisle United | Free | |
| 29 August 2011 | MF | (England) Kyel Reid | (England) Charlton Athletic | Free | |
| 31 August 2011 | GK | (England) Matt Duke | (England) Hull City | Free | |
| 31 August 2011 | DF | (England) Dean Overson | (England) Burnley | Free | |
| 15 September 2011 | FW | (England) Craig Fagan | (England) Hull City | Free | |
| 7 October 2011 | DF | (Netherlands) Marcel Seip | (England) Plymouth Argyle | Free | |
| 11 January 2012 | DF | (England) Rob Kozluk | (England) Port Vale | Free | |
| 12 January 2012 | MF | (England) Ricky Ravenhill | (England) Notts County | Free | |
| 10 February 2012 | DF | (England) Matt Fry | (England) West Ham United | Free | |
Players loaned in
| Date from | Pos. | Name | From | Date to | Ref. |
| 28 July 2011 | GK | (Denmark) Martin Hansen | (England) Liverpool | August 2011 | |
| 29 July 2011 | MF | (England) Jack Compton | (Scotland) Falkirk | January 2012 | |
| 5 August 2011 | DF | (England) Liam Moore | (England) Leicester City | 31 December 2011 | |
| 8 August 2011 | GK | (Sweden) Oscar Jansson | (England) Tottenham Hotspur | September 2011 | |
| 11 August 2011 | MF | (Northern Ireland) Michael Bryan | (England) Watford | 3 January 2012 | |
| 31 August 2011 | MF | (Republic of Ireland) Jamie Devitt | (England) Hull City | January 2012 | |
| 23 September 2011 | DF | (England) Andrew Davies | (England) Stoke City | End of season | |
| 29 September 2011 | MF | (England) Adam Reed | (England) Sunderland | 29 October 2011 | |
| 14 November 2011 | MF | (England) Ricky Ravenhill | (England) Notts County | 14 January 2012 | |
| 1 January 2012 | DF | (England) Charlie Taylor | (England) Leeds United | 31 January 2012 | |
| 11 January 2012 | MF | (England) Andy Haworth | (England) Bury | 14 April 2012 | |
| 19 January 2012 | FW | (England) Deane Smalley | (England) Oxford United | End of season | |
| 26 January 2012 | MF | (England) Will Atkinson | (England) Hull City | End of season | |
| 24 February 2012 | GK | (England) Jamie Annerson | (England) Rotherham United | End of season | |
| 16 March 2012 | FW | (England) Chris Dagnall | (England) Barnsley | End of season | |
Players loaned out
| Date from | Pos. | Name | From | Date to | Ref. |
| 19 August 2011 | MF | (England) Leon Osborne | (England) Southport | 19 September 2011 | |
| 24 August 2011 | FW | (England) Darren Stephenson | (England) Hinckley United | 11 September 2011 | |
| 24 August 2011 | MF | (England) Luke Dean | (England) Hinckley United | 24 September 2011 | |
| 2 September 2011 | MF | (Republic of Ireland) Terry Dixon | (England) FC Halifax Town | 2 October 2011 | |
| 29 September 2011 | MF | (England) Dominic Rowe | (England) Barrow | 29 December 2011 | |
| 5 October 2011 | DF | (England) Adam Robinson | (England) Blyth Spartans | 5 November 2011 | |
| 5 October 2011 | FW | (England) Darren Stephenson | (England) Woodley Sports | 5 November 2011 | |
| 5 October 2011 | FW | (England) Dean Overson | (England) Vauxhall Motors | 5 November 2011 | |
| 14 October 2011 | DF | (England) Guy Branston | (England) Rotherham United | 14 January 2012 | |
| 21 October 2011 | FW | (England) Nialle Rodney | (England) Darlington | 21 November 2011 | |
| 24 November 2011 | FW | (England) Nialle Rodney | (England) Mansfield Town | 24 December 2011 | |
| 16 December 2011 | MF | (England) Patrick Lacey | (England) Vauxhall Motors | 31 January 2012 | |
| 12 January 2012 | DF | (England) Steve Williams | (Scotland) Inverness CT | End of season | |
| 27 January 2012 | FW | (Scotland) Mark Stewart | (Scotland) Hamilton Academical | End of season | |
| 30 January 2012 | FW | (England) Darren Stephenson | (England) Stocksbridge Park Steels | 1 March 2012 | |
| 20 February 2012 | GK | (England) Matt Duke | (England) Northampton Town | 28 March 2012 | |
| 13 March 2012 | FW | (England) Darren Stephenson | (England) Southport | 13 April 2012 | |
| 27 March 2011 | FW | (England) Dean Overson | (England) Bradford Park Avenue | End of season | |
Players transferred out
| Date | Pos. | Name | Subsequent club | Fee | Ref |
| 9 June 2011 | FW | (England) Jake Speight | (Wales) Wrexham | Undisclosed | |
| 31 January 2012 | MF | (England) Luke O'Brien | (England) Exeter City | Undisclosed | |
Players released
| Date | Pos. | Name | Subsequent club | Join date | Ref. |
| 10 May 2011 | GK | (England) Lenny Pidgeley | (England) Exeter City | 16 June 2011 | |
| 3 June 2011 | FW | (England) Gareth Evans | (England) Rotherham United | 1 July 2011 | |
| 20 June 2011 | MF | (England) Jon Worthington | (England) Mansfield Town | 1 July 2011 | |
| 1 July 2011 | GK | (England) Chris Elliott | (England) Harrogate Town | 11 July 2011 | |
| 1 July 2011 | MF | (Jamaica) Omar Daley | (Scotland) Motherwell | 23 August 2011 | |
| 1 July 2011 | MF | (England) Ryan Harrison | Unattached | | |
| 1 July 2011 | DF | (Northern Ireland) Shane Duff | Unattached | | |
| 1 July 2011 | FW | (Nigeria) Chib Chilaka | (England) Braintree Town | 3 August 2011 | |
| 1 July 2011 | DF | (England) Louis Horne | (England) Hinckley United | 15 August 2011 | |
| 1 July 2011 | GK | (England) Lloyd Saxton | Unattached | | |
| 10 August 2011 | MF | (England) Alex Flett | (England) Brigg Town | 26 August 2011 | |
| 16 October 2011 | MF | (England) Leon Osborne | Unattached | | |
| 26 October 2011 | MF | (England) Lewis Hunt | (England) Hendon | 7 January 2012 | |
| 8 December 2011 | DF | (England) Adam Robinson | Unattached | | |
| 31 January 2012 | FW | (England) Nialle Rodney | (England) Lincoln City | 31 January 2012 | |
| 31 January 2012 | DF | (England) Patrick Lacey | (England) Droylsden | 9 March 2012 | |
| 23 March 2012 | DF | (England) Robbie Threlfall | (England) Morecambe | 17 May 2012 | |
| 28 April 2012 | MF | (Scotland) Chris Mitchell | Unattached | | |
| 28 April 2012 | MF | (Wales) Michael Flynn | Unattached | | |
| 1 May 2012 | FW | (England) Craig Fagan | Unattached | | |

== Awards ==
| End of Season Awards | Winner |
|---|---|
| Telegraph & Argus Bradford City Player of the Year | Luke Oliver |
| Players' Player of the Year | Luke Oliver |
| Friends of Bradford City Player of the Year | Luke Oliver |
| Telegraph & Argus' Most Consistent Player of the Year | Kyel Reid |
| Bradford City Supporters Trust Under 25's Player of the Year | Kyel Reid |
| Youth Team's Player of the Year | Adam Baker |
