= Nialle Rodney =

English footballer

Personal information
- Full name: Niall Seyi Rodney
- Date of birth: 28 February 1991 (age 35)
- Place of birth: Nottingham, England
- Positions: Forward; winger

Team information
- Current team: Runcorn Linnets

Youth career
- 2004–2009: Nottingham Forest

Senior career*
Years	Team	Apps	(Gls)
2009–2011	Nottingham Forest	3	(0)
2010	→ Ilkeston Town (loan)	9	(2)
2011	→ Burton Albion (loan)	3	(0)
2011–2012	Bradford City	5	(0)
2011	→ Darlington (loan)	1	(0)
2011	→ Mansfield Town (loan)	2	(0)
2012	Lincoln City	6	(0)
2013	AFC Telford United	3	(0)
2013–2014	Hartlepool United	12	(0)
2014	Ilkeston	3	(0)
2015	Spalding United		
2015	Coalville Town		
2016	Long Eaton United		
2017–2018	Wythenshawe Amateurs		
2018	Ramsbottom United	6	(1)
2019	FC United of Manchester	5	(1)
2019–2020	Lancaster City	11	(1)
2020	Ashton United	4	(0)
2020	Ramsbottom United	5	(0)
2022–	Runcorn Linnets	3	(1)
- * Club domestic league appearances and goals as of 23:00, 24 April 2021 (UTC)

Nialle Seyi E. Rodney (born 28 February 1991) is an English footballer who plays as a forward for Runcorn Linnets.

== Club career ==
=== Nottingham Forest ===
Rodney started his career with Nottingham Forest. In the 2009–10 season, he went out on loan to Ilkeston Town making nine appearances and scoring twice against Eastwood Town and Solihull Moors. He made his Forest debut in November 2010, against Cardiff City, coming on as a substitute for the injured Dexter Blackstock. On 8 March 2011, he signed a one-month loan deal with Football League Two side Burton Albion, but after three appearances he had to return to Nottingham Forest because of an ankle injury.

=== Bradford City ===
Rodney left Forest and signed a one-year contract with Bradford City in July 2011. In October 2011, he was given a one-month loan spell at Conference side Darlington to gain first-team experience, before moving to Mansfield Town on loan in November 2011.

=== Lincoln City ===
On 31 January 2012 Rodney signed for Conference National club Lincoln City, until the end of the season.

=== AFC Telford United ===
He joined AFC Telford United on 19 February 2013 and on that same day he made his debut for the Bucks in a 3–3 draw at home against Tamworth. He left after the Mansfield game.

=== Hartlepool United ===
Rodney joined EFL League Two side Hartlepool United on a one-year contract after impressing coaching staff during a month's trial after scoring in friendlies against Whitby Town and during the club's pre-season tour of Holland against Almere City. Towards the end of March, Hartlepool announced that Rodney was to leave the club at the end of the month.

=== Non-league ===
After Rodney's release from Hartlepool, he signed for Ilkeston in October 2014, making four substitute appearances for the club in all competitions. He then played in the Grantham and District Saturday League for Greyhounders.

He then played for Spalding United, Coalville Town, Long Eaton United, Wythenshawe Amateurs and Ramsbottom United.

In May 2019 he signed for FC United of Manchester.

He left FC United in October 2019 and was training with Curzon Ashton before he signed for Lancaster City in November 2019. He made his debut for the club on 16 November in a league match against Scarborough.

In January 2020 he departed Lancaster, signing for Ashton United.

He then rejoined Ramsbottom United. In June 2022 he signed for Runcorn Linnets.

== Career statistics ==
As of match played 27 October 2014

Appearances and goals by club, season and competition
Club	Season	League			FA Cup		League Cup		Other		Total	
Club	Season	Division	Apps	Goals	Apps	Goals	Apps	Goals	Apps	Goals	Apps	Goals
Nottingham Forest	2009–10	Championship	0	0	0	0	0	0	0	0	0	0
Nottingham Forest	2010–11	Championship	3	0	0	0	0	0	0	0	3	0
Nottingham Forest	Total		3	0	0	0	0	0	0	0	3	0
Ilkeston Town (loan)	2009–10	Conference North	9	2	0	0	—		0	0	9	2
Burton Albion (loan)	2010–11	League Two	3	0	0	0	0	0	0	0	3	0
Bradford City	2011–12	League Two	5	0	0	0	1	0	1 (Note: Appearance(s) in Football League Trophy)	0	7	0
Darlington (loan)	2011–12	Conference Premier	1	0	0	0	—		0	0	1	0
Mansfield Town (loan)	2011–12	Conference Premier	2	0	0	0	—		0	0	2	0
Lincoln City	2011–12	Conference Premier	6	0	0	0	—		0	0	6	0
AFC Telford United	2012–13	Conference Premier	3	0	0	0	—		0	0	3	0
Hartlepool United	2013–14	League Two	12	0	0	0	1	0	2	1	15	1
Ilkeston	2014–15	Northern Premier League Premier Division	3	0	1	0	—		0	0	4	0
Career total			47	2	1	0	2	0	3	1	53	3
