= Andrew Davies (footballer) =

English footballer (born 1984)

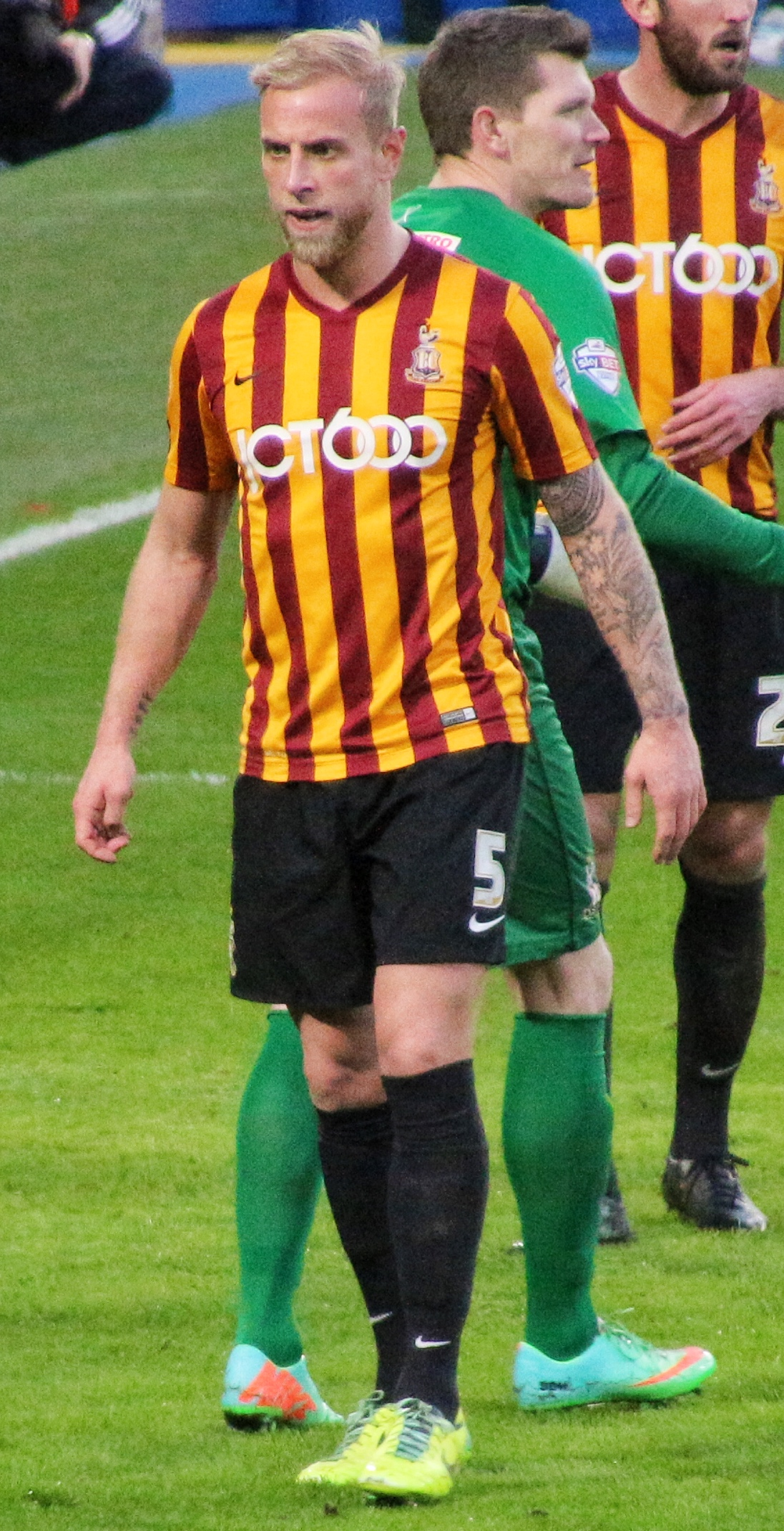
- Davies playing for Bradford City in 2015

Personal information
- Full name: Andrew John Davies
- Date of birth: 17 December 1984 (age 41)
- Place of birth: Stockton-on-Tees, England
- Height: 6 ft 3 in (1.91 m)
- Position: Defender

Youth career
- 1998–2002: Middlesbrough

Senior career*
Years	Team	Apps	(Gls)
2002–2008	Middlesbrough	53	(0)
2005	→ Queens Park Rangers (loan)	9	(0)
2005–2006	→ Derby County (loan)	23	(3)
2007–2008	→ Southampton (loan)	12	(0)
2008	Southampton	11	(0)
2008–2012	Stoke City	2	(0)
2009	→ Preston North End (loan)	5	(0)
2009	→ Sheffield United (loan)	8	(0)
2010	→ Walsall (loan)	3	(0)
2011	→ Middlesbrough (loan)	6	(0)
2011	→ Crystal Palace (loan)	1	(0)
2011–2012	→ Bradford City (loan)	26	(2)
2012–2015	Bradford City	84	(5)
2015–2018	Ross County	87	(5)
2018–2019	Hartlepool United	12	(2)
2019	Dundee	0	(0)
Total		342	(17)

International career
2007	England U21	1	(0)
- * Club domestic league appearances and goals

Andrew John Davies (born 17 December 1984) is an English former professional footballer who played as a centre back.

Originally signing with Middlesbrough as a 13-year-old, Davies has played for 11 clubs at a variety of levels. He was loaned to Queens Park Rangers, Derby County and Southampton, signing with the latter after leaving Middlesbrough. Davies then played for Stoke City, Preston North End, Sheffield United, Walsall, Middlesbrough for a second time, Crystal Palace and Bradford City. In 2015, he moved to Scotland, signing with Ross County. Davies helped County win the 2015–16 Scottish League Cup, but left the club after they were relegated in 2018.

Davies represented England in youth internationals, and was capped once by the under-21 team.

== Club career ==
=== Middlesbrough ===
Davies was born in Stockton-on-Tees and attended Northfield School in Billingham, near Middlesbrough. He joined Middlesbrough as a thirteen-year-old, moving up the club ranks as a member of the reserve side. Davies turned professional in October 2002 after impressing in the under-19s and as captain of the reserve team. He made his debut on 6 November 2002, in a League Cup defeat against Ipswich Town. His Premier League debut came three months later, in a 5–2 defeat at home to Aston Villa.

He made nine further appearances during the 2003–04 season before suffering a broken leg in a reserve league game in March 2004. Despite this, Davies was named 2003–04 Middlesbrough Players' Young Player of the Year. He made his first team return from injury against Coventry City in the League Cup on 27 October 2004.

He made two appearances in the first half of the 2004–05 season before joining Queens Park Rangers on an initial one month's loan in January to gain some first team experience, eventually remaining there for three months. Davies initially turned down a permanent move to the club. Following an injury crisis, he was recalled by Middlesbrough in April 2005.

In July 2005, Davies was loaned out again, to Derby County until the end of the 2005–06 season with the deal including a clause that allowed him to be recalled by his parent club in January. This was initially for a period of six months, although it was later extended to a full season's loan. Davies made his Derby County debut in the opening game of the season, playing the full 90 minutes, in a 1–1 draw against Brighton & Hove Albion. His first goal came on 18 September 2005, in a 2–2 draw against Southampton. Three months later on 3 December 2005, Davies scored twice, in a 2–0 win over Norwich City. In January 2006, an injury crisis at Middlesbrough prompted them to recall Davies, who had generally impressed during his time at Derby, despite being sent off on three occasions.

On his return to the Riverside Stadium, Davies played a significant role in Middlesbrough's journey to the semi-finals of the FA Cup and final of the UEFA Cup. With Gareth Southgate committing to youth in 2006–07, Davies found his way into the first team and made 23 appearances in all.

=== Southampton ===
Davies signed for Southampton on 9 October 2007, on an initial three-month loan with a view to a permanent transfer in January. It took until 3 November 2007 for Davies to make his Southampton debut, coming on as a substitute for Grégory Vignal in the 72nd minute, in a 1–0 loss against Charlton Athletic.

On 10 January 2008, the signing was made permanent, for an undisclosed fee, believed to be £1 million. He missed the last few matches of the 2007–08 season as a result of a fractured cheek bone incurred in March 2008. Despite only playing for half a season, he was voted the Saints Player of the Season.

Ahead of the 2008–09 season, Davies said he was close to making a return to full first team training and was expecting to return in three to four weeks.

=== Stoke City ===
In August 2008, Davies joined Stoke City on a four-year contract. The transfer fee paid to Southampton was reported as £1.3 million.

Davies' start at Stoke did not go as planned after suffering a knee injury in training, resulting in him requiring an operation. In late-November, he was close to making a first team return and played in the reserve side. He did not feature for the first team until the beginning of December 2008, when he made several appearances on the bench with his first being an away game against Newcastle United. Davies made his Stoke debut against Manchester United, coming on as a substitute for Rory Delap in the 72nd minute on Boxing Day 2008, playing at right back after Andy Wilkinson had been sent off for a second bookable offence. He made another substitute appearance on 28 December 2008, against West Ham. Davies made his first start against Hartlepool United in the FA Cup third Round which ended in a shock 2–0 victory for the League One side. During the match, he sustained an injury in the 71st minute when he fell into the Hartlepool dugout. Davies then played no further part in Stoke's 2008–09 campaign.

=== Loan moves ===
On 13 February 2009, Davies signed for Preston North End on a one-month emergency loan. He made his debut the next day, playing 90 minutes, in a 1–0 win over Norwich City. After making five appearances for Preston, Davies returned to his parent club.

Having failed to make the bench for Stoke at the start of the 2009–10 season, Davies joined Sheffield United on a three-month loan in September 2009. On the same day, he made his debut, in the Steel City derby, playing 90 minutes, in a 3–2 win over Sheffield Wednesday. With his loan expiring in December, Davies returned to Stoke having played eight times for "The Blades".

After being left out of Stoke's 25-man squad for the 2010–11 season, Davies joined Walsall for an initial month's loan on 6 October 2010. He made his Walsall debut three days after signing for the club, in a 2–-1 win over Exeter City. However, Davies suffered a thigh injury during a match against Tranmere Rovers and had his loan spell with Walsall, which was originally going to end on 7 November 2010, cut short.

On 18 February, he re-joined Middlesbrough on loan for the rest of the 2010–11 season and made his debut against in a 3–2 victory at Millwall the same day. After making six appearances for the club, he was allowed to return to Stoke having struggled with injuries.

On 3 August 2011, Davies joined Crystal Palace on a one-month loan deal. He made his Crystal Palace debut in the opening game of the season, in a 2–1 loss against Peterborough United and made another appearance in the first round of the League Cup, where he set up one of Wilfried Zaha's goals in a 2–0 win over Crawley Town. These were his only appearances for the Eagles and he returned to Stoke City at the end of August.

Davies signed for Bradford City on a three-month loan on 23 September 2011. In October 2011, he was sent off in consecutive games, against Torquay United and Swindon Town. Having served a three-game suspension for the first red card, he received a four-match ban for the red card against Swindon, due to it being his second of the season. In December 2011, Davies agreed to extend his loan until the end of the season. He scored his first goal for the club with a curling free kick on 21 January 2012, in a 1–1 draw at home to Burton Albion. He appeared to score his second goal for the club against Bristol Rovers; however, the goal was eventually credited to teammate David Syers. His second goal of 2012 came in the 5th minute of injury time against Port Vale in a 1–1 draw on 14 February. Davies was sent off for a third time in the 2011–12 season following a post-match brawl against Crawley Town and received a five match ban.

=== Bradford City ===
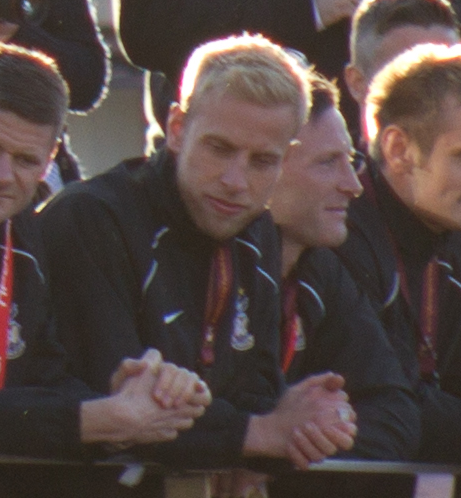
Davies at the victory parade following Bradford City's victory in the 2013 Football League Two play-off final

On 24 May 2012, Bradford City announced that Davies had agreed a permanent contract on a one-year deal. He played his first game since joining the club permanently on 18 August, against Gillingham. He scored his first goal of the season on 25 August, in a 5–1 victory over Wimbledon, scoring directly from a free-kick. On 15 September, he scored his second goal of the season during a 3–0 win at home against Barnet. A week later he scored his third goal of the season, opening the scoring in a 2–0 win away to Oxford United. However, Davies then suffered a knee injury, against Burton Albion and was ruled out for four months. After recovering from the injury, he made his first team return, making his first start since October, in a 3–0 win over Wycombe Wanderers on 12 February 2013. Twelve days later in the Football League Cup Final, Davies was named on the substitutes bench and came on after 46 minutes for Curtis Good, as Bradford City went on to lose the game 5–0 against Swansea City. Davies then scored his fourth goal of the season on 9 April 2013, in a 4–1 win over Bristol Rovers. After being sent-off in the last game of the season against Cheltenham Town, Davies went on to appear in two out of three play-offs matches, including the final, where he played the full 90 minutes, as Bradford City won 3–0 against Northampton Town, to win promotion to League One.

On 8 June 2013, Davies signed a new two-year deal with Bradford with the option of a third year. He continued to be in the first team for the first ten matches before it was announced on 11 October 2013, that he would be out for up to four months with injury, after undergoing knee surgery. Davies then made his first team return on 28 January 2014, making his first start, in a 0–0 draw against Preston North End. However, Davies suffered a calf problem during a match against Stevenage on 1 March 2014 and was substituted after 36 minutes, although manager Phil Parkinson believed the injury was not serious. Despite Davies initially being expected to return against Brentford in March 2015, he was not included in the squad, with Parkinson citing his fitness as the reason. Davies eventually made his first team return on 11 March 2014, in a 2–0 win over Colchester United. Two weeks later, on 22 March 2014, he scored his first goal of the season, in a 2–1 loss against Shrewsbury Town. Davies later helped the club survive in League One in their first season, finishing in eleventh place.

In the 2014–15 season, Davies continued to be in the first team, where he appeared in the first four matches, however, he suffered an arm injury during a match against Peterborough United and had to be substituted in the 55th minute. It was later confirmed that he would be out for two months following surgery. Davies made his first team return on 4 October 2014, in a 2–0 win over Crewe. Davies was also in the squad when Bradford came from 2–0 down to win 4–2 away against Chelsea in the fourth round of the FA Cup. Throughout the 2014–15 season, Davies continued to be plagued by injuries. Despite this, he went on to make twenty-eight appearances in the 2014–15 season.

After four years at Bradford, it was announced that Davies had left the club to move to Scotland.

=== Ross County ===
On 30 June 2015, it was announced that Davies had signed for Scottish Premiership side Ross County on a two-year deal. Davies had turned down the chance to stay at Bradford before joining Ross County. Upon joining the club, Davies was given the club's captaincy following Richard Brittain's departure. In his first game as captain, Davies made his Ross County debut, in the opening game of the season, where he played 90 minutes in a 2–0 loss against Celtic. On 13 March 2016, Davies captained Ross County to their first major silverware with a 2–1 victory over Hibernian in the Scottish League Cup.

Ahead of the 2016–17 season, Davies was replaced as Ross County captain by Paul Quinn, after telling the club he wanted to return to England, with his wife having failed to settle in Scotland. After talking with his family and the club, he then decided to stay for the remainder of his contract. On 23 January 2017, he signed an extension to his contract, keeping him at the club for a further two years, until summer 2019. Davies courted controversy when he received a red card for stamping on Celtic captain Scott Brown during a 3–0 defeat at Celtic Park in March 2018. County were relegated from the Premiership in 2018, and Davies was released by the club in June 2018.

=== Hartlepool United ===
After terminating his contract at Ross County, Davies signed for Hartlepool United on 25 June 2018. On 7 January 2019, Hartlepool agreed to cancel Davies' contract.

=== Dundee ===
Davies signed an 18-month contract with Scottish Premiership club Dundee in January 2019. Four days after signing for Dundee, he broke a metatarsal during a training match with St Johnstone. In March 2019, having still not played for the club, he broke his foot again and was ruled out for the remainder of the season. Davies left the club by mutual consent on 2 September 2019, having never played once for the club.

== International career ==
Davies was eligible to play for Wales or England, as he holds a dual registration. In the end, Davies chose to play for England.

Having previously been called up by England U19 and England U20, Davies received one cap at England U21 level against Turkey U21 on 10 October 2003.

== Personal life ==
His elder brother, Mark, is a cricketer with Kent. Davies stated that if he wasn't a footballer, he would have become a professional cricketer, having played while growing up, stopping at sixteen as result of his football career at Middlesbrough.

Davies now runs a sports drink business.

Davies has said his childhood hero was Franco Baresi.

== Career statistics ==
Appearances and goals by club, season and competition
Club	Season	League			National Cup		League Cup		Other		Total	
Club	Season	Division	Apps	Goals	Apps	Goals	Apps	Goals	Apps	Goals	Apps	Goals
Middlesbrough	2002–03	Premier League	1	0	0	0	1	0	–		2	0
Middlesbrough	2003–04	Premier League	10	0	0	0	0	0	–		10	0
Middlesbrough	2004–05	Premier League	3	0	0	0	2	0	0	0	5	0
Middlesbrough	2005–06	Premier League	12	0	0	0	0	0	4 (Note: Appearances in UEFA Cup)	0	16	0
Middlesbrough	2006–07	Premier League	23	0	3	0	0	0	–		26	0
Middlesbrough	2007–08	Premier League	4	0	0	0	2	0	–		6	0
Middlesbrough	Total		53	0	3	0	5	0	4	0	65	0
Queens Park Rangers (loan)	2004–05	Championship	9	0	0	0	0	0	–		9	0
Derby County (loan)	2005–06	Championship	23	3	1	0	0	0	–		24	3
Southampton (loan)	2007–08	Championship	12	0	0	0	0	0	–		12	0
Southampton	2007–08	Championship	11	0	2	0	0	0	–		13	0
Southampton	2008–09	Championship	0	0	0	0	0	0	–		0	0
Southampton	Total		11	0	2	0	0	0	0	0	13	0
Stoke City	2008–09	Premier League	2	0	1	0	0	0	–		3	0
Stoke City	2009–10	Premier League	0	0	0	0	1	0	–		1	0
Stoke City	2010–11	Premier League	0	0	0	0	0	0	–		0	0
Stoke City	2011–12	Premier League	0	0	0	0	0	0	–		0	0
Stoke City	Total		2	0	1	0	1	0	0	0	4	0
Preston North End (loan)	2008–09	Championship	5	0	0	0	0	0	–		5	0
Sheffield United (loan)	2009–10	Championship	8	0	0	0	0	0	–		8	0
Walsall (loan)	2010–11	League One	3	0	0	0	0	0	0	0	3	0
Middlesbrough (loan)	2010–11	Championship	6	0	0	0	0	0	–		6	0
Crystal Palace (loan)	2011–12	Championship	1	0	0	0	1	0	–		2	0
Bradford City (loan)	2011–12	League Two	26	2	2	0	1	0	2 (Note: Appearance(s) in Football League Trophy)	0	31	2
Bradford City	2012–13	League Two	28	4	0	0	2	0	3 (Note: One appearance in Football League Trophy and two in League Two play-offs)	0	33	4
Bradford City	2013–14	League One	28	1	0	0	0	0	0	0	28	1
Bradford City	2014–15	League One	28	0	6	0	0	0	0	0	34	0
Bradford City	Total		84	5	6	0	2	0	3	0	95	5
Ross County	2015–16	Scottish Premiership	31	3	3	0	4	0	–		38	3
Ross County	2016–17	Scottish Premiership	31	1	1	0	2	0	–		34	1
Ross County	2017–18	Scottish Premiership	25	1	1	0	5	0	–		31	1
Ross County	Total		87	5	5	0	11	0	0	0	103	5
Hartlepool United	2018–19	National League	12	2	2	0	–		0	0	14	2
Dundee	2018–19	Scottish Premiership	0	0	0	0	0	0	–		0	0
Career total			342	17	22	0	21	0	9	0	394	17

== Honours ==
Bradford City

- Football League Two play-offs: 2013
- Football League Cup runner-up: 2012–13

Ross County

- Scottish League Cup: 2015–16

Individual

- Southampton Player of the Year: 2007–08
- PFA Scotland Team of the Year: 2015–16
