= Jon McLaughlin (footballer) =

Scottish footballer

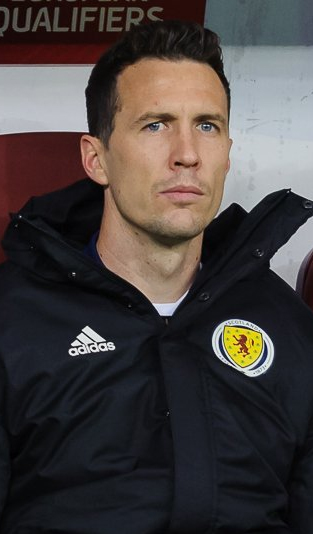
- McLaughlin with Scotland in 2019

Personal information
- Full name: Jonathan Peter McLaughlin
- Date of birth: 9 September 1987 (age 39)
- Place of birth: Edinburgh, Scotland
- Height: 6 ft 3 in (1.91 m)
- Position: Goalkeeper

Team information
- Current team: Middlesbrough
- Number: 33

Senior career*
Years	Team	Apps	(Gls)
2006–2007	Harrogate Railway Athletic	21	(0)
2007–2008	Harrogate Town	21	(0)
2008–2014	Bradford City	125	(0)
2014–2017	Burton Albion	133	(0)
2017–2018	Heart of Midlothian	33	(0)
2018–2020	Sunderland	78	(0)
2020–2024	Rangers	29	(0)
2024–2025	Swansea City	0	(0)
2025–	Middlesbrough	0	(0)

International career^{‡}
2018–2019	Scotland	2	(0)
- * Club domestic league appearances and goals as of 22:04, 1 December 2023 (UTC) ‡ National team caps and goals as of 07:47, 14 October 2019 (UTC)

Jonathan Peter McLaughlin (born 9 September 1987) is a Scottish professional footballer who plays as a goalkeeper for EFL Championship club Middlesbrough.

He previously played for Harrogate Railway Athletic, Harrogate Town, Bradford City (including appearing in the 2013 Football League Cup Final), Burton Albion, Heart of Midlothian, Sunderland, Rangers, and Swansea City.

He made his international debut for Scotland in 2018.

== Career ==
=== Early career ===
Born in Edinburgh, McLaughlin played non-League football for both Harrogate Railway Athletic and Harrogate Town.

=== Bradford City ===
He signed for Bradford City in May 2008. He had trained with Bradford for a year prior to his signing and combined playing for the two Harrogate clubs with a sports coaching degree at Leeds Metropolitan University. He made his league debut for Bradford City in the final match of the 2008–09 season, on 2 May 2009, against Chesterfield. McLaughlin had been due to make his debut earlier in the season, but was prevented by doing so because of injury. He signed a new one-year contract with Bradford City on 3 June 2009.

McLaughlin signed a new three-year contract in early June 2010.

In the 2010–2011 season McLaughlin was in and out of the team, with Lenny Pidgeley also challenging for the goalkeeper spot. However, Pidgeley was released by Bradford at the end of the season. At the start of the following season McLaughlin fell ill, and Matt Duke was brought in as first choice goalkeeper. On 27 March 2012, he received a 3 match ban after being sent off against Crawley Town as he took part in a post-match brawl. On 17 September 2012, McLaughlin was named in the Football League Team of the Week for League Two. After appearing as a substitute in the 2013 League Cup Final, McLaughlin enjoyed an extended run in the first-team, and played in the League Two play-off final in May 2013. Following the match, and Bradford City's subsequent promotion, McLaughlin was told by the club he had a future with them, after a clause in his contract to extend it by one year was utilised.

Ahead of the 2013–14 season, recently departed goalkeeper Matt Duke said he believed McLaughlin would be the club's new first-choice goalkeeper, though McLaughlin later stated that he felt he still had work to do to prove himself as the club's first-choice keeper. In December 2013, McLaughlin stated that the club had had a "great start to the season", though he felt that recent performances had been poor. Later that month, manager Phil Parkinson praised McLaughlin's performances. As of April 2014, McLaughlin was one of only two players to have appearance in every league match for the club.

McLaughlin left the club in July 2014 after failing to agree a new contract. McLaughlin stated that he left the club "on a sour note."

=== Burton Albion ===
McLaughlin signed a one-year contract with Burton Albion on 23 July 2014. After winning promotion with Burton to League One, McLaughlin stated how excited he was at the prospect of meeting former club Bradford City in the league. He was released by Burton Albion at the end of the 2016–17 season.

=== Heart of Midlothian ===
After a trial spell, McLaughlin signed a one-year contract with Scottish Premiership club Heart of Midlothian in August 2017. He made his first appearance for Hearts on 9 September, in a goalless draw against Aberdeen at Murrayfield. He left Hearts on 31 May 2018, at the expiry of his contract.

=== Sunderland ===
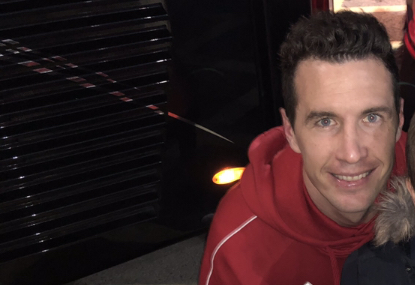
McLaughlin in 2018

McLaughlin signed for League One club Sunderland in June 2018. In October 2018 he said he was comfortable with the pressure of playing for such a big team.

=== Rangers ===
On 23 June 2020, McLaughlin joined Rangers on a two-year deal. On 30 January 2022, McLaughlin signed a contract extension until summer 2024.

He was released by Rangers at the end of the 2023–24 season.

=== Swansea City ===
On 28 August 2024, McLaughlin signed for EFL Championship club Swansea City on a short-term deal through to January 2025. On 17 January 2025, he agreed a contract extension to the end of the season.

He was released by Swansea at the end of the 2024–25 season. His only appearance for the club was in a 3–0 defeat against Southampton in the third round of the FA Cup.

=== Middlesbrough ===
He signed for Middlesbrough on 1 September 2025. On 28 May 2026, Middlesbrough announced it was releasing the player.

== International career ==
McLaughlin's debut call-up to the Scotland national team was in March 2018, and again in May 2018. He made his first full international appearance on 2 June 2018, in a 1–0 defeat against Mexico. He was without a club contract at the time, as his debut came just a few days after he had left Hearts.

In May 2021 he was selected to the Scotland squad for the delayed UEFA Euro 2020 tournament.

In September 2022 he was recalled to the Scotland squad for the UEFA Nations League, but had to withdraw.

== Career statistics ==
As of 1 December 2023

Appearances and goals by club, season and competition
Club	Season	League			National cup (Note: Includes Scottish Cup, FA Cup)		League cup (Note: Includes Scottish League Cup, EFL Cup)		Other		Total	
Club	Season	Division	Apps	Goals	Apps	Goals	Apps	Goals	Apps	Goals	Apps	Goals
Harrogate Town	2007–08	Conference North	21	0	—		—		—		21	0
Bradford City	2008–09	League Two	1	0	0	0	0	0	0	0	1	0
Bradford City	2009–10	League Two	7	0	0	0	0	0	0	0	7	0
Bradford City	2010–11	League Two	25	0	0	0	2	0	1 (Note: Appearances in Football League Trophy)	0	28	0
Bradford City	2011–12	League Two	23	0	3	0	0	0	2	0	28	0
Bradford City	2012–13	League Two	23	0	2	0	2	0	6 (Note: Three appearances in Football League Trophy, three in League Two play-offs)	0	33	0
Bradford City	2013–14	League One	46	0	1	0	1	0	0	0	48	0
Bradford City	Total		125	0	6	0	5	0	9	0	145	0
Burton Albion	2014–15	League Two	45	0	0	0	3	0	0	0	48	0
Burton Albion	2015–16	League One	45	0	0	0	0	0	0	0	45	0
Burton Albion	2016–17	Championship	43	0	1	0	1	0	—		45	0
Burton Albion	Total		133	0	1	0	4	0	0	0	138	0
Heart of Midlothian	2017–18	Scottish Premiership	33	0	3	0	—		—		36	0
Sunderland	2018–19	League One	46	0	3	0	1	0	5 (Note: Two appearances in Football League Trophy, three in League One play-offs)	0	55	0
Sunderland	2019–20	League One	32	0	1	0	1	0	1	0	35	0
Sunderland	Total		78	0	4	0	2	0	6	0	90	0
Rangers	2020–21	Scottish Premiership	11	0	1	0	1	0	1 (Note: Appearance(s) in the UEFA Europa League)	0	14	0
Rangers	2021–22	Scottish Premiership	8	0	5	0	2	0	1	0	16	0
Rangers	2022–23	Scottish Premiership	10	0	0	0	1	0	5 (Note: Appearance(s) in the UEFA Champions League)	0	16	0
Rangers	2023–24	Scottish Premiership	0	0	0	0	0	0	0	0	0	0
Rangers	Total		29	0	6	0	4	0	7	0	46	0
Swansea City	2024-25	Championship	0	0	1	0	0	0	0	0	1	0
Middlesbrough	2025–26	Championship	0	0	0	0	0	0	0	0	0	0
Middlesbrough	2026–27	Championship	0	0	0	0	0	0	0	0	0	0
Middlesbrough	Total		0	0	0	0	0	0	0	0	0	0
Career total			419	0	21	0	15	0	22	0	477	0

=== International ===
Appearances and goals by national team and year
National team	Year	Apps	Goals
Scotland	2018	1	0
Scotland	2019	1	0
Total		2	0

== Honours ==
Bradford City

- Football League Two play-offs: 2013
- Football League Cup runner-up: 2012–13

Burton Albion

- Football League One runner-up: 2015–16
- Football League Two: 2014–15

Sunderland

- EFL Trophy runner-up: 2018–19

Rangers

- Scottish Premiership: 2020–21
- Scottish Cup: 2021–22
- UEFA Europa League runner-up: 2021–22

Individual

- PFA Team of the Year: 2015–16 League One
