= James Meredith (soccer) =

Australian soccer player (born 1988)

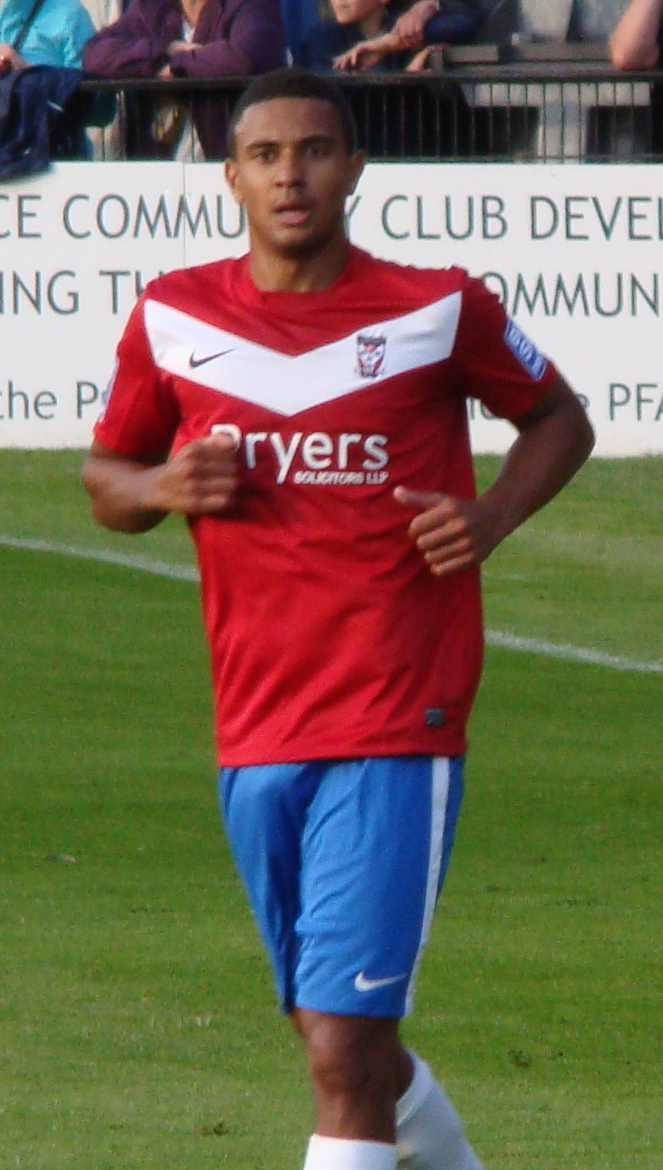
- Meredith playing for York City in 2011

Personal information
- Full name: James Gregory Meredith
- Date of birth: 5 April 1988 (age 38)
- Place of birth: Albury, Australia
- Height: 1.85 m (6 ft 1 in)
- Position: Left back

Youth career
- 2004–2006: Derby County

Senior career*
Years	Team	Apps	(Gls)
2006–2007	Derby County	0	(0)
2006	→ Cambridge United (loan)	1	(0)
2007	→ Chesterfield (loan)	1	(0)
2007	Sligo Rovers	4	(0)
2008–2009	Shrewsbury Town	3	(0)
2008–2009	→ A.F.C. Telford United (loan)	28	(1)
2009–2012	York City	131	(3)
2012–2017	Bradford City	181	(4)
2017–2019	Millwall	82	(0)
2019–2020	Perth Glory	23	(1)
2020–2022	Macarthur FC	40	(3)
2024–	Brisbane City	19	(2)

International career^{‡}
2015	Australia	2	(0)

Managerial career
- 2022–2023: Macarthur FC (Assistant coach)
- * Club domestic league appearances and goals as of 18 August 2024 ‡ National team caps and goals as of 18:41, 27 August 2020 (UTC)

James Gregory Meredith (born 5 April 1988) is an Australian former soccer player who played as a left back. He played for English Football League clubs Chesterfield, Shrewsbury Town, Bradford City and Millwall and for A-League Men clubs Perth Glory and Macarthur FC.

Meredith started his career with the Derby County youth system in 2004, signing a professional contract in 2006. He was loaned out to Cambridge United and Chesterfield before moving to Sligo Rovers. He returned to England with Shrewsbury Town, but after making only three appearances for them, joined A.F.C. Telford United on loan for most of the 2008–09 season. Meredith joined York City in 2009, playing in their victories in the 2012 FA Trophy Final and 2012 Conference Premier play-off final, the latter seeing the club promoted to League Two.

Meredith signed for Bradford City in 2012, winning promotion to League One in his first season with victory in the 2013 League Two play-off final. Meredith moved to Millwall in the Championship in 2017 before leaving two years later. In 2019, he returned to Australia to play in the A-League for Perth Glory and then Macarthur, where he retired and moved into coaching in 2022.

Meredith made two appearances for the Australian national team in 2015. He was also a member of the Australian Socceroos squad for the 2018 FIFA World Cup.

== Early and personal life ==
Meredith was born in Albury, New South Wales. His father, Greg Pollard, was a squash player who ranked as highly as third in the world while playing in England. Meredith attended Scotch College in Melbourne, Victoria and grew up supporting South Melbourne FC and Manchester United F.C.

== Club career ==
=== Early career ===
Meredith was spotted playing soccer in Melbourne at the age of 16 by a Derby County scout. He was offered a trial by the club and he joined their youth system on a two-year contract in 2004. He progressed through the youth team and he signed a two-year professional contract with Derby on 19 July 2006. He joined Conference National club Cambridge United on a one-month loan on 19 October 2006 and he made his debut in a 3–0 defeat to Oxford United. He finished the loan with two appearances. He had a trial with Conference National club York City in January 2007, playing in a reserve-team match against Rotherham United. He joined League One team Chesterfield on a one-month loan on 19 February 2007, making one appearance as a left midfielder in a 2–0 defeat to Tranmere Rovers on 2 March. Following the expiry of the loan, Chesterfield opted against extending it.

=== Sligo Rovers ===
Meredith joined League of Ireland Premier Division club Sligo Rovers on a contract until the end of the 2007 season on 31 July 2007. He made his debut in a 2–0 defeat at Galway United on 24 August 2007 and he finished his time at the club with four appearances.

=== Shrewsbury Town ===
Meredith signed for League Two team Shrewsbury Town on 14 January 2008 on a one-and-a-half-year contract after training with the club, which included a clause that after making five appearances the contract could be renegotiated. He made his debut on 23 February 2008 in the 2–1 home defeat to Hereford United, finishing the 2007–08 season with three appearances, with his final match coming against Rochdale on the last day of the season. He was told that he did not figure in new manager Paul Simpson's immediate plans in July 2008, being left behind as the club travelled to Spain on a pre-season training camp.

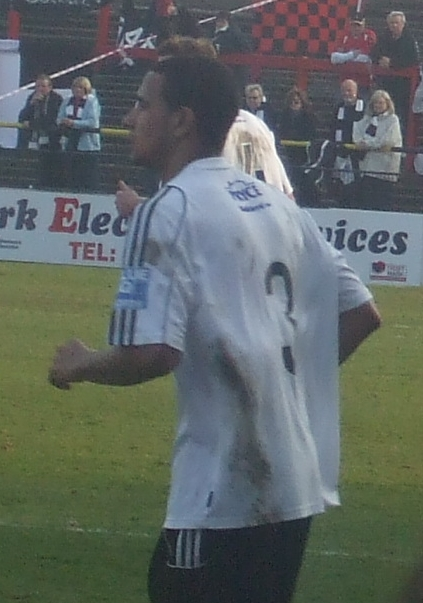
Meredith playing for A.F.C. Telford United in 2009

Meredith joined Conference North club A.F.C. Telford United on 16 October 2008 on a one-month loan, saying "I don't see it as a step down but as a step up, because I've become stagnant at Shrewsbury". Meredith signed a further one-month extension with Telford in November 2008 and he scored the only goal in a 1–0 victory over Gateshead. The loan was again extended for a further month in December 2008, keeping him at the club until early January 2009. Telford were looking to extend his loan for the remainder of 2008–09, but a contractual hitch held this up. He eventually extended the loan on 8 January. Meredith played for Telford in both legs of the semi-final defeat to York City in the FA Trophy. He was handed a red card against Barrow in the semi-final of the Conference League Cup in March, which meant he would miss the Final because of a two-match suspension. He was substituted after breaking his nose in a 3–0 victory over Burscough in April. He played for Telford in the 2009 Conference North play-off Final on 8 May, which was lost 1–0 to Gateshead, meaning the team missed out on promotion to the Conference Premier. He finished the season with 46 appearances and one goal for Telford.

=== York City ===
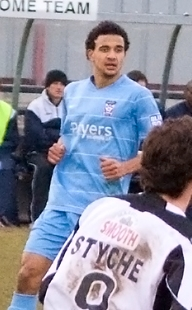
Meredith playing for York City in 2010

He was offered a permanent contract by Telford after the end of the season, but he opted to join Conference Premier team York City on 22 May 2009. He made his debut in a 2–1 defeat to Oxford United on 8 August 2009. Meredith was sent off after receiving two yellow cards in a 1–1 draw against Oxford on 17 October 2009, which resulted in him being handed a one-match suspension for York's match against Luton Town. He signed a new contract with York on 29 March 2010 to keep him at the club until the summer of 2011. He played in both legs of York's play-off semi-final victory over Luton, which finished 2–0 on aggregate. He started in the 2010 Conference Premier play-off final at Wembley Stadium on 16 May 2010, which York lost 3–1 to Oxford. He finished 2009–10 with 56 appearances for York.

Meredith had an operation on his knee during the summer of 2010. He made his first appearance of 2010–11 in the opening match, after starting a 2–1 defeat to Kidderminster Harriers on 14 August 2010. His first goal for York came in a 4–1 victory over league leaders AFC Wimbledon on 1 February 2011 after beating the offside trap to beat goalkeeper Seb Brown. He finished the season with 51 appearances and one goal. After rejecting two new contract offers with York, he eventually signed a new one-year contract with the club in May 2011.

Meredith won the 2012 FA Trophy Final with York at Wembley Stadium on 12 May 2012, in which they beat Newport County 2–0. Eight days later he played in the 2–1 victory over Luton in the 2012 Conference Premier play-off final at Wembley, seeing the club return to the Football League after an eight-year absence with promotion to League Two. His 2011–12 season finished with 55 appearances and two goals for York, and was named in the 2011–12 Conference Premier Team of the Year alongside York teammate Matty Blair.

=== Bradford City ===
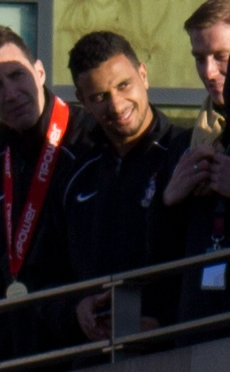
Meredith with the parade that followed Bradford City's victory in the 2013 League Two play-off final

Meredith signed for League Two Bradford City on 29 June 2012 on a two-year contract. His debut came after starting in Bradford's opening match of 2012–13, a 1–0 victory away to League One team Notts County in the League Cup first round. Meredith scored his first goal for Bradford in a 3–1 home win against Cheltenham Town on 20 October 2012. He achieved promotion into League One in his first season with Bradford, playing in their 3–0 victory over Northampton Town in the 2013 League Two play-off final at Wembley Stadium on 18 May 2013. He finished the season with 44 appearances and 1 goal.

Due to his strong performance as Bradford's starting left back during the 2016–17 League One season, Meredith was included in the PFA Team of the Year. He started for Bradford as they were beaten 1–0 by Millwall at Wembley Stadium in the 2017 League One play-off final.

=== Millwall ===
Meredith signed for newly promoted Championship club Millwall on 29 May 2017 on a two-year contract. He made his debut in a 1–0 loss away to Nottingham Forest in Millwall's opening match of the 2017–18 Championship season on 4 August 2017. Millwall terminated Meredith's contract by mutual consent on 31 July 2019.

=== Perth Glory ===
Meredith signed for A-League club Perth Glory on 27 September 2019 on a one-year contract.

=== Macarthur ===
On 9 December 2020, Meredith joined Macarthur FC. Following the 2021–22 A-League Men season, Meredith retired from playing and joined Macarthur's coaching staff.

== International career ==
In March 2015, Meredith expressed his desire to play for the Australia national team. Australia coach Ange Postecoglou said at the time that he was open to selecting a number of new players to the national team, including Meredith. Meredith was first called up by Australia for a 2018 FIFA World Cup qualifier against Jordan on 8 October 2015, for which he was an unused substitute as Australia lost 2–0. Meredith debuted for Australia on 12 November 2015, after being selected in the starting line-up for the 2018 FIFA World Cup qualifier against Kyrgyzstan, which the team won 3–0 at home. He only learned he would be starting on the morning of the match, and his family flew to Canberra from Melbourne to watch him. He made a second start in a win over Bangladesh four days later.

Meredith had not featured for Australia again by August 2017, when he stated his aim to be recalled to the Australia squad following his move to Millwall in the Championship. He was named in Australia's 23-man squad for the 2018 FIFA World Cup.

== Style of play ==
Meredith primarily plays as a left back, although he has been described as being "versatile" and is able to play at centre back or in midfield. After signing for York in 2009, manager Martin Foyle described him as being "a very attack-minded, left-footed full-back with pace who can play the ball out from the back."

== Career statistics ==
=== Club ===
As of 9 May 2022

Appearances and goals by club, season and competition
Club	Season	League			National Cup (Note: Includes FA Cup)		League Cup (Note: Includes League/EFL Cup)		Other		Total	
Club	Season	Division	Apps	Goals	Apps	Goals	Apps	Goals	Apps	Goals	Apps	Goals
Derby County	2006–07	Championship	0	0	0	0	0	0	0	0	0	0
Cambridge United (loan)	2006–07	Conference National	1	0	1	0	—		—		2	0
Chesterfield (loan)	2006–07	League One	1	0	—		—		—		1	0
Sligo Rovers	2007	League of Ireland; Premier Division	4	0	0	0	—		—		4	0
Shrewsbury Town	2007–08	League Two	3	0	—		—		—		3	0
Shrewsbury Town	2008–09	League Two	0	0	—		0	0	0	0	0	0
Shrewsbury Town	Total		3	0	—		0	0	0	0	3	0
A.F.C. Telford United (loan)	2008–09	Conference North	28	1	3	0	—		15 (Note: Four appearances in Conference League Cup, eight in FA Trophy, three in Conference North play-offs)	0	46	1
York City	2009–10	Conference Premier	43	0	4	0	—		9 (Note: Six appearances in FA Trophy, three in Conference Premier play-offs)	0	56	0
York City	2010–11	Conference Premier	45	1	5	0	—		1 (Note: Appearance in FA Trophy)	0	51	1
York City	2011–12	Conference Premier	43	2	1	0	—		11 (Note: Eight appearances in FA Trophy, three in Conference Premier play-offs)	0	55	2
York City	Total		131	3	10	0	—		21	0	162	3
Bradford City	2012–13	League Two	32	1	3	0	5	0	4 (Note: One appearance in Football League Trophy, three in League Two play-offs)	0	44	1
Bradford City	2013–14	League One	26	0	1	0	1	0	1 (Note: Appearance in Football League Trophy)	0	29	0
Bradford City	2014–15	League One	40	0	8	0	3	0	1	0	52	0
Bradford City	2015–16	League One	42	1	3	0	0	0	2 (Note: Appearances in League One play-offs)	0	47	1
Bradford City	2016–17	League One	41	2	0	0	1	0	6 (Note: Three appearances in EFL Trophy, three in League One play-offs)	0	48	2
Bradford City	Total		181	4	15	0	10	0	14	0	220	4
Millwall	2017–18	Championship	46	0	1	0	0	0	—		47	0
Millwall	2018–19	Championship	36	0	1	0	1	0	—		38	0
Millwall	Total		82	0	2	0	1	0	—		85	0
Perth Glory	2019–20	A-League	23	1	—		—		0	0	23	1
Macarthur	2020–21	A-League	19	2	—		—		—		19	2
Macarthur	2021–22	A-League Men	21	1	2	0	—		—		23	1
Macarthur	Total		40	3	2	0	—		—		42	3
Career total			494	12	33	0	11	0	50	0	607	12

=== International ===
As of match played 17 November 2015

Appearances and goals by national team and year
National team	Year	Apps	Goals
Australia	2015	2	0
Total		2	0

== Honours ==
York City

- Conference Premier play-offs: 2012
- FA Trophy: 2011–12

Bradford City

- Football League Two play-offs: 2013

Individual

- Conference Premier Team of the Year: 2011–12
- PFA Team of the Year: 2016–17 League One
