= Adam Baker (footballer) =

English footballer

Personal information
- Date of birth: 8 December 1993 (age 32)
- Place of birth: Leeds, England
- Position: Striker

Youth career
- 2010–2012: Bradford City

Senior career*
Years	Team	Apps	(Gls)
2012–2013	Bradford City	1	(0)
2012–2013	→ Harrogate Town (loan)	5	(2)
2013	→ Scarborough Athletic (loan)	0	(0)
2013	→ Bradford Park Avenue (loan)	8	(2)
- * Club domestic league appearances and goals as of 17:43, 28 May 2013 (UTC)

Adam Baker (born 8 December 1993) is an English professional footballer who plays as a striker.

== Career ==
Born Leeds, Baker was awarded his first professional contract with Bradford City in April 2012, the only apprentice to be offered a professional deal that season. Baker, alongside two youth players, was asked to travel down with the first-team squad for the match against Cheltenham Town on 28 April 2012, where he was named as an un-used substitute. Baker made his senior debut for Bradford City on 5 May 2012, appearing as a substitute in a 0–0 home draw against Swindon Town in the Football League. Before the start of the 2012–13 season, Baker publicly spoke about the importance of playing in pre-season friendlies, saying that "it's a big year ahead for me and this is a big pre-season."

Baker joined non-league team Harrogate Town on a month's loan on 21 December 2012, scoring on his debut on 1 January 2013. He signed a month's loan deal with Scarborough Athletic on 4 March 2013. On 21 March 2013, he signed on loan for Bradford Park Avenue until 27 April 2013.

In May 2013, it was announced that Baker's contract would not be renewed and he would leave the club.

== Career statistics ==
As of 28 May 2013

Appearances and goals by club, season and competition
Club	Season	League		FA Cup		League Cup		Other		Total	
Club	Season	Apps	Goals	Apps	Goals	Apps	Goals	Apps	Goals	Apps	Goals
Bradford City	2011–12	1	0	0	0	0	0	0	0	1	0
Bradford City	2012–13	0	0	2	0	2	0	0	0	4	0
Bradford City	Total	1	0	2	0	2	0	0	0	5	0
Harrogate Town (loan)	2012–13	5	2	0	0	0	0	0	0	5	2
Bradford Park Avenue (loan)	2012–13	8	2	0	0	0	0	0	0	8	2
Career total		14	4	2	0	2	0	0	0	18	4
