= Darren Stephenson =

Jamaican footballer (born 1993)

Personal information
- Full name: Darren Coil Anthony Stephenson
- Date of birth: 6 March 1993 (age 33)
- Place of birth: Saint Catherine, Jamaica
- Positions: Left winger; striker

Team information
- Current team: Connah's Quay Nomads
- Number: 7

Youth career
- 2004–2011: Bradford City

Senior career*
Years	Team	Apps	(Gls)
2011–2012	Bradford City	1	(0)
2011	→ Hinckley United (loan)	1	(0)
2011	→ Woodley Sports (loan)		
2012	→ Stocksbridge Park Steels (loan)		
2012	→ Southport (loan)	6	(2)
2012	Southport	7	(0)
2012	→ Chorley (loan)		
2012–2016	Chorley		
2016–2017	Tranmere Rovers	11	(0)
2016–2017	→ AFC Fylde (loan)	3	(0)
2017–2020	Stockport County	71	(10)
2020–2021	Curzon Ashton	14	(2)
2021	→ FC Halifax Town (loan)	4	(1)
2021–2023	Chester	63	(10)
2022	→ Curzon Ashton (loan)	3	(0)
2023–2025	Farsley Celtic		
2025–2026	Flint Town United	28	(6)
2026–	Connah's Quay Nomads	8	(0)
- * Club domestic league appearances and goals as of 06:35, 7 November 2026 (UTC)

Darren Coil Anthony Stephenson (born 6 March 1993) is a Jamaican professional footballer who plays as a left winger and striker for Connah's Quay Nomads.

== Career ==
Stephenson made his senior debut for Bradford City on 26 March 2011, having been promoted to the first-team squad two days before, with squad number 29. Stephenson was offered his first professional six-month contract by Bradford on 9 May 2011. On 23 August 2011, Stephenson was given a new two-year contract after impressing staff. The next day, he joined Hinckley United on a month-long loan deal, alongside Luke Dean, before returning to Bradford City in early September 2011, having made just one appearance. On 5 October 2011, Stephenson moved on loan to Woodley Sports, and on 30 January 2012 he moved on loan to Stocksbridge Park Steels. He moved on loan to Southport in March 2012. In August 2012, Stephenson was released from his contract with Bradford City. On 11 August 2012, Stephenson signed for Football Conference side Southport on a twelve-month contract. He joined Chorley on loan on 31 August 2012, scoring on his debut the next day in a 1–0 victory against Ilkeston. He was recalled to Southport on 12 October from his loan spell. Stephenson re-signed for Chorley on a permanent basis in December 2012. He received interest from Hartlepool United in the January 2016 transfer window.

After 62 goals in 157 games for Chorley, he signed for Tranmere Rovers in July 2016. He moved on loan to AFC Fylde in November 2016. He joined Stockport County for the 2017–18 season. He was released by Stockport in May 2019. He re-signed with the club in July 2019. Later that month he broke his leg in a friendly game.

He moved to Curzon Ashton in September 2020, and on loan to FC Halifax Town in April 2021.

In June 2021, Stephenson joined Chester. In November 2022, he returned to Curzon Ashton on loan until January.

In May 2023, he signed for Farsley Celtic.

In June 2025 he moved to Cymru Premier club Flint Town United. He departed from the club at the end of the 2025–26 season, signing for Connah's Quay Nomads in June 2026.

== Career statistics ==
As of 28 December 2021

Appearances and goals by club, season and competition
Club	Season	League			FA Cup		League Cup		Other		Total	
Club	Season	Division	Apps	Goals	Apps	Goals	Apps	Goals	Apps	Goals	Apps	Goals
Bradford City	2010–11	League Two	1	0	0	0	0	0	0	0	1	0
Bradford City	2011–12	League Two	0	0	0	0	0	0	0	0	0	0
Bradford City	Total		1	0	0	0	0	0	0	0	1	0
Hinckley United (loan)	2011–12	Conference North	1	0	0	0	0	0	0	0	1	0
Southport	2011–12	Conference Premier	6	2	0	0	0	0	0	0	6	2
Southport	2012–13	Conference Premier	7	0	0	0	0	0	0	0	7	0
Southport	Total		13	2	0	0	0	0	0	0	13	2
Tranmere Rovers	2016–17	National League	11	0	1	0	0	0	0	0	12	0
AFC Fylde	2016–17	National League	3	0	0	0	0	0	2	0	5	0
Stockport County	2017–18	National League North	35	3	0	0	0	0	7	2	42	5
Stockport County	2018–19	National League	36	7	2	0	0	0	7	1	45	8
Stockport County	Total		71	10	2	0	0	0	14	3	87	13
Curzon Ashton	2020–21	National League North	14	2	1	0	—		1 (Note: Appearance(s) in FA Trophy)	1	16	3
FC Halifax Town (loan)	2020–21	National League	4	1	0	0	—		0	0	4	1
Chester	2021–22	National League North	15	3	0	0	—		1	0	16	3
Career total			133	18	4	0	0	0	18	4	155	22
