= Will Atkinson =

English footballer (born 1988)

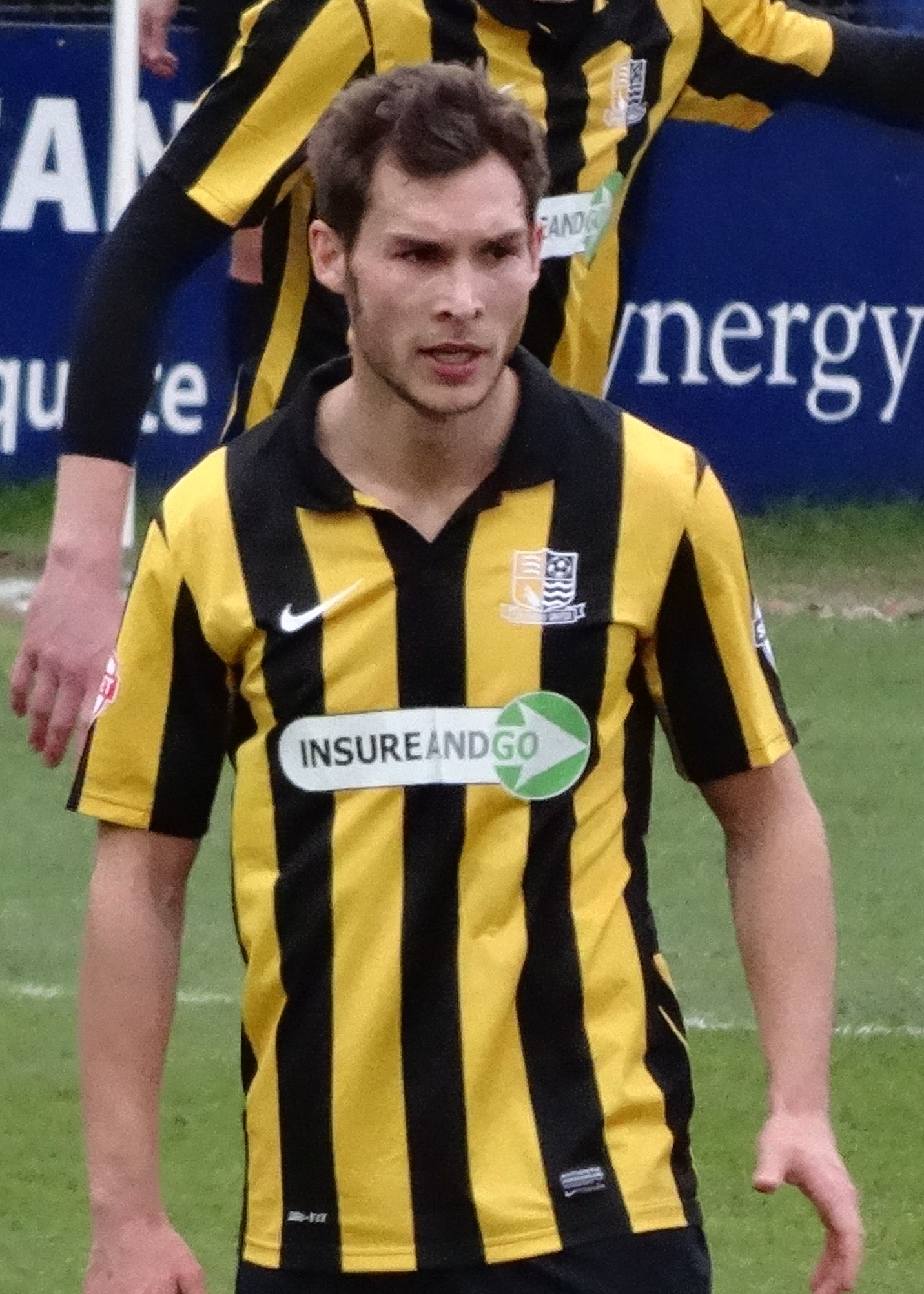
- Atkinson playing for Southend United in 2014

Personal information
- Full name: William Henry Atkinson
- Date of birth: 14 October 1988 (age 38)
- Place of birth: Driffield, England
- Height: 5 ft 10 in (1.78 m)
- Positions: Midfielder; centre-back

Team information
- Current team: Mickleover

Youth career
- 1997–2006: Hull City

Senior career*
Years	Team	Apps	(Gls)
2006–2012	Hull City	6	(1)
2007	→ Port Vale (loan)	4	(0)
2008	→ Mansfield Town (loan)	12	(0)
2009–2010	→ Rochdale (loan)	15	(3)
2010–2011	→ Rotherham United (loan)	3	(1)
2011	→ Rochdale (loan)	21	(2)
2011–2012	→ Plymouth Argyle (loan)	22	(4)
2012	→ Bradford City (loan)	12	(1)
2012–2013	Bradford City	42	(1)
2013–2017	Southend United	154	(10)
2017–2019	Mansfield Town	57	(3)
2019–2020	Port Vale	11	(1)
2020–2021	Alfreton Town	12	(0)
2021–2022	Southend United	33	(0)
2022–2023	Boston United	37	(0)
2023–	Mickleover (Note: Statistics for the 2025–26 season not known.)	52	(2)
- * Club domestic league appearances and goals as of 10:05, 26 April 2026 (UTC)

William Henry Atkinson (born 14 October 1988) is an English semi-professional footballer who plays as a midfielder for Northern Premier League Division One Midlands club Mickleover.

Having begun his professional career with Hull City in 2006, Atkinson spent time on loan with Port Vale, Mansfield Town, Rochdale (twice), Rotherham United and Plymouth Argyle. He was promoted out of League Two with Rochdale in 2009–10. He signed with Bradford City in July 2012. He played in the 2013 League Cup final defeat and the 2013 League Two play-off final victory. He signed with Southend United in July 2013 and helped the club to win the 2015 League Two play-off final. He signed with Mansfield Town in May 2017. He signed a short-term deal with Port Vale in October 2019, remaining at the club until the end of the 2019–20 season. He signed with Southend United in August 2021 after spending the curtailed 2020–21 season with Alfreton Town. He joined Boston United for the 2022–23 season and Mickleover for the following season.

== Career ==
=== Hull City ===
Born in Driffield, East Riding of Yorkshire, Atkinson started his career as a trainee with Hull City. In December 2006, at the age of 18, he penned a two-and-a-half-year professional deal with the club.

In October 2007, he joined caretaker manager Dean Glover's Port Vale in League One for a six-week loan period. He made his senior debut on 13 October, in a 1–0 defeat by Brighton & Hove Albion at Vale Park. 14 days later he won his first start, in a 2–1 win over Swindon Town. He made a total of four appearances for the "Valiants" before returning to Hull after Lee Sinnott replaced Glover as manager. Upon his return he made one substitute appearance for Hull, in an FA Cup defeat to Plymouth Argyle on 5 January. Later in the month, he joined League Two Mansfield Town on a one-month loan. Mansfield manager Bill Dearden later extended the deal into a further month, and handed Atkinson a total of ten starts and two substitute appearances. He had a quiet 2008–09, not joining any clubs on loan and not making an appearance for the Hull City first-team, as the "Tigers" enjoyed their maiden season in the Premier League.

He made his League Cup bow on 25 August 2009 and was replaced by Kevin Kilbane 73 minutes into a 3–1 win over Southend United. In November he joined Rochdale on a month-long loan. The loan was extended after the team went unbeaten in his six games at the club. This run included a 3–0 win over Macclesfield Town on 5 December, in which Atkinson scored his first senior goal. Though he returned before the end of the season, his efforts in his 15 appearances helped Rochdale to win automatic promotion into League One. Upon his return to Hull, he won his first start for the club in the Premier League clash with Wigan Athletic at the DW Stadium on 3 May. He marked this landmark appearance with a headed goal, though by this point Hull's relegation was confirmed. Six days later he played in the club's last game of the season, helping them to earn a respectable point at home to Liverpool.

He was selected for four Championship games at the start of 2010–11, before he signed for Rotherham United on loan deadline day (25 November). He played just three games but did find the net in a 5–0 demolition of former club Port Vale. In January 2011, Atkinson decided to rejoin Rochdale on loan for the end of the season, after turning down the opportunity for extending his United loan. He went on to make 21 appearances for "Dale", finding the net twice.

In August 2011, he joined Plymouth Argyle on loan for the entirety of the 2011–12 season. He scored the opening goal on his debut against Rotherham United and at the beginning of September at Burton Albion. Atkinson netted two more goals in November, against Torquay United and Northampton Town respectively. Atkinson was recalled by Hull City in January 2012, having made 25 appearances in all competitions for Argyle.

=== Bradford City ===
In January 2012, he signed on loan with Bradford City until the end of the season. He scored his first goal for the "Bantams" on 28 February, in a 4–0 win over Barnet at Underhill. In July 2012 he signed a one-year contract with Bradford City. On 11 August, he made his first appearance since signing permanently, in a 1–0 win over Notts County at Meadow Lane. He scored his first goal of the season on 3 November, opening the scoring in a 1–1 draw away to Northampton Town in the first round of the FA Cup. He scored his second goal of the season in the replay on 13 November, which finished 3–3, and also scored his penalty in the resulting shoot-out which Bradford won 4–2. On 12 February 2013, he scored his first league goal of the season in a 3–0 win away to Wycombe Wanderers. Having played in all seven matches of Bradford's run to the 2013 final of the League Cup, including victories over Premier League sides Wigan Athletic, Arsenal and Aston Villa, he played at Wembley in the 5–0 defeat to Swansea City. He was a 78th-minute substitute in the play-off final victory over Northampton Town.

=== Southend United ===
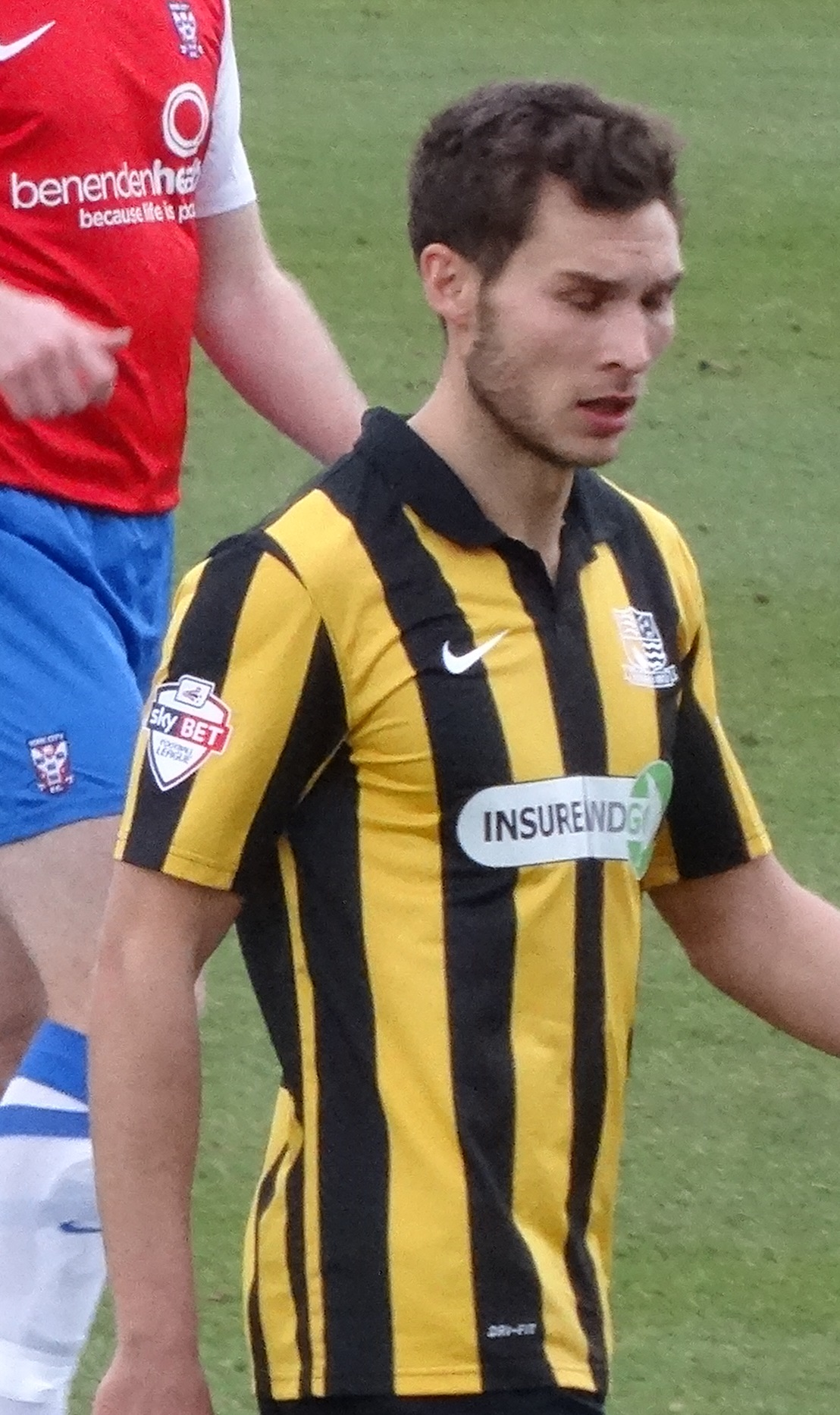
Atkinson playing for Southend United in 2014

In July 2013, Atkinson signed a two-year contract with Southend United, reuniting him with his former Hull City boss, Phil Brown. He was an ever-present in the league for the "Shrimpers" in the 2013–14 season, and helped the club to secure a play-off spot, where they were beaten by Burton Albion at the semi-final stage. He was a first-team regular in the 2014–15 campaign as United again secured a play-off place and played the first 80 minutes of the play-off final as Southend beat Wycombe Wanderers to win promotion into League One. He signed a new two-year contract in June 2015, and went on to make 39 appearances in the 2015–16 campaign as Southend posted a 15th-place finish. Atkinson scored four goals in 41 games in the 2016–17 season as United finished in seventh place, one place and one point outside the play-offs. He scored two of these goals in a 3–0 win over former club Bradford City at Roots Hall on 19 November, which earned himself a place on the EFL team of the week. He chose to leave the club in the summer after feeling that he "wasn't made to feel valued or wanted by Southend".

=== Mansfield Town ===
On 30 May 2017, Atkinson joined EFL League Two club Mansfield Town as manager Steve Evans's 11th summer signing. He was transfer-listed by Mansfield at the end of the 2017–18 season. However, he remained at Field Mill and was praised by manager David Flitcroft for his contribution as a squad player during the 2018–19 season, before being released in May 2019.

=== Port Vale ===
On 4 October 2019, Atkinson signed a short-term deal with Port Vale, 12 years after briefly playing for the club on loan. He was signed by manager John Askey following injuries to Tom Conlon and Manny Oyeleke, leaving him to compete with Luke Joyce, Jake Taylor, Scott Burgess and Ryan Lloyd for a place in central midfield. He was up to match fitness after having spent a full pre-season training with Doncaster Rovers. He made his "second debut" for the club the following day, playing at right-back in a 3–1 home win over Morecambe, and in doing so set a club record for the longest time between appearances as his previous game for the club came 11 years and 11 months earlier. He scored his first goal for the club on 22 October, when his injury-time strike secured a 2–1 victory over former club Bradford City at Valley Parade. In January 2020, he signed an extended deal to keep him at the club until the end of the 2019–20 season. However, he was not retained at the end of the campaign.

=== Non-League ===
On 5 November 2020, Atkinson signed with National League North club Alfreton Town. He played 13 games before the 2019–20 season was curtailed due to the ongoing COVID-19 pandemic in England.

On 24 August 2021, Atkinson returned for a second spell at Southend United and, in doing so, reunited with former manager Phil Brown; he joined the National League club a short-term deal after impressing on trial. New manager Kevin Maher gave him a contract extension in January, praising Atkinson's work ethic and character. He played 35 matches in the 2021–22 campaign but was not offered a new contract in the summer, much to his surprise.

On 28 June 2022, Atkinson returned to the National League North to join Boston United, with manager Paul Cox stating that "he was much sought after following his time at Southend and we are delighted to have him onboard". He played 37 league games in the 2022–23 season, with Boston posting a 15th-place finish, and was one of 13 players released by the club.

Atkison signed with Mickleover of the Southern League Premier Division Central on 26 June 2023. There he transitioned into a ball-playing centre-back. He made 45 appearances in the 2023–24 season, including in the play-off semi-final defeat to AFC Telford United. He made 20 appearances in the 2024–25 campaign, which culinated in relegation out of the Northern Premier League Premier Division. Despite this relegation, he stayed on at the club. He was confirmed to be staying out at the end of the 2025–26 season after being named as Players Player of the Year.

== Style of play ==
Atkinson is a central midfielder but is versatile and can play at wide right, wing-back and right-back. Port Vale manager John Askey described him as "a good passer of the ball and an intelligent player."

== Career statistics ==
As of end of the 2025–26 season

Appearances and goals by club, season and competition
Club	Season	League			FA Cup		EFL Cup		Other		Total	
Club	Season	Division	Apps	Goals	Apps	Goals	Apps	Goals	Apps	Goals	Apps	Goals
Hull City	2006–07	Championship	0	0	0	0	0	0	—		0	0
Hull City	2007–08	Championship	0	0	1	0	0	0	0	0	1	0
Hull City	2008–09	Premier League	0	0	0	0	0	0	—		0	0
Hull City	2009–10	Premier League	2	1	0	0	1	0	—		3	1
Hull City	2010–11	Championship	4	0	0	0	0	0	—		4	0
Hull City	2011–12	Championship	0	0	0	0	0	0	—		0	0
Hull City	Total		6	1	1	0	1	0	0	0	8	1
Port Vale (loan)	2007–08	League One	4	0	0	0	—		—		4	0
Mansfield Town (loan)	2007–08	League Two	12	0	—		—		—		12	0
Rochdale (loan)	2009–10	League Two	15	3	—		—		—		15	3
Rotherham United (loan)	2010–11	League Two	3	1	0	0	—		0	0	3	1
Rochdale (loan)	2010–11	League One	21	2	—		—		—		21	2
Plymouth Argyle (loan)	2011–12	League Two	22	4	2	0	—		1 (Note: Appearance(s) in the Football League Trophy / EFL Trophy.)	0	25	4
Bradford City	2011–12	League Two	12	1	—		—		—		12	1
Bradford City	2012–13	League Two	42	1	3	2	8	0	4 (Note: 1 appearance in the Football League Trophy and 3 appearances in the play-offs.)	0	57	3
Bradford City	Total		54	2	3	2	8	0	4	0	69	4
Southend United	2013–14	League Two	45	2	3	1	1	0	3 (Note: 1 appearance in the Football League Trophy and 2 appearances in the play-offs.)	0	52	3
Southend United	2014–15	League Two	36	2	0	0	1	0	4 (Note: 1 appearance in the EFL Trophy and 3 appearances in the play-offs.)	0	41	2
Southend United	2015–16	League One	36	2	0	0	0	0	3	0	39	2
Southend United	2016–17	League One	37	4	1	0	0	0	3	0	41	4
Southend United	Total		154	10	4	1	2	0	13	0	173	11
Mansfield Town	2017–18	League Two	39	2	3	0	1	0	3	0	46	2
Mansfield Town	2018–19	League Two	18	1	1	0	2	0	4 (Note: 3 appearances in the EFL Trophy and 1 appearance in the play-offs.)	0	25	1
Mansfield Town	Total		57	3	4	0	3	0	7	0	71	3
Port Vale	2019–20	League Two	11	1	1	0	—		3	0	15	1
Alfreton Town	2019–20	National League North	12	0	0	0	—		1 (Note: Appearance(s) in the FA Trophy.)	0	13	0
Southend United	2021–22	National League	33	0	1	0	—		1	0	35	0
Boston United	2022–23	National League North	37	0	0	0	—		1	0	38	0
Mickleover	2023–24	Southern League; Premier Division Central	36	2	3	0	—		5 (Note: 4 appearances in the FA Trophy and 1 appearance in the play-offs.)	0	44	2
Mickleover	2024–25	Northern Premier League; Premier Division	16	0	0	0	—		4 (Note: 1 appearances in the FA Trophy and 3 appearance in the Derbyshire Senior Cup.)	0	20	0
Mickleover	2025–26	Northern Premier League; Division One Midlands										
Mickleover	2026–27	Northern Premier League; Division One Midlands	0	0	0	0	0	0	0	0	0	0
Mickleover	Total		52	2	3	0	0	0	9	0	64	2
Career total			493	29	19	3	14	0	40	0	568	32

== Honours ==
Rochdale

- Football League Two third-place promotion: 2009–10

Bradford City

- Football League Two play-offs: 2013
- Football League Cup runner-up: 2012–13

Southend United

- Football League Two play-offs: 2015
