= Luke Dean (footballer, born 1991) =

English footballer

Personal information
- Full name: Luke Adam Dean
- Date of birth: 14 May 1991 (age 35)
- Place of birth: Cleckheaton, England
- Position: Midfielder

Team information
- Current team: Brighouse Town

Youth career
- 2002–2009: Bradford City

Senior career*
Years	Team	Apps	(Gls)
2009–2012	Bradford City	3	(0)
2009	→ FC Halifax Town (loan)	1	(0)
2011	→ Ossett Town (loan)	2	(0)
2011	→ Hinckley United (loan)	7	(2)
2011	→ Harrogate Town (loan)	4	(1)
2012	→ Harrogate Town (loan)	6	(0)
2012–2013	Harrogate Town	26	(5)
2013	Bradford Park Avenue	1	(0)
2013–2014	Workington	3	(0)
2014–2015	Harrogate Town	4	(0)
2015	→ Bradford Park Avenue (loan)	19	(1)
2015–2017	Bradford Park Avenue	60	(4)
2017–2019	Scarborough		
2019–2020	Matlock Town	0	(0)
2020–2022	Yorkshire Amateur	30	(0)
2022–2023	Guiseley	13	(1)
2023	Liversedge	5	(0)
2023–	Brighouse Town	0	(0)
- * Club domestic league appearances and goals as of 11 June 2023 (UTC)

Luke Adam Dean (born 14 May 1991) is an English professional footballer who plays as a midfielder for Brighouse Town.

== Career ==
Dean joined Bradford City's centre of excellence in 2002. He made his club debut against Morecambe on 13 April 2010. becoming the first Asian home grown player to make his debut as a professional for Bradford City. He rewarded with a contract on 16 June 2010 but suffered a setback when he broke his leg in a pre-season friendly.

Dean moved to Ossett Town on loan in March 2011 but was recalled a month later by new Bradford City manager Peter Jackson. Luke Dean was the only player of the 2011 Bradford City out of contract players to be handed a new contract, which would keep him at the club until at least June 2012.

In August 2011, he joined Hinckley United on a month-long loan deal, alongside Darren Stephenson. In May 2012, Dean was released from Bradford . He signed for Harrogate Town of the Conference North in the summer of 2012.

In January 2015, Dean signed a one-month loan deal for Bradford Park Avenue In February 2015, Bradford Park Avenue and Harrogate Town agreed to extend the loan deal until the end of the 2014–15 season.

Dean joined Scarborough on 25 May 2017. He played for the club until May 2019, where he signed with Matlock Town.

In June 2022, Dean joined Guiseley following their relegation from the National League North. In January 2023, he joined Liversedge. Having been unable to prevent Liversedge's relegation, he joined Brighouse Town in June 2023.
