= Kyel Reid =

English footballer (born 1987)

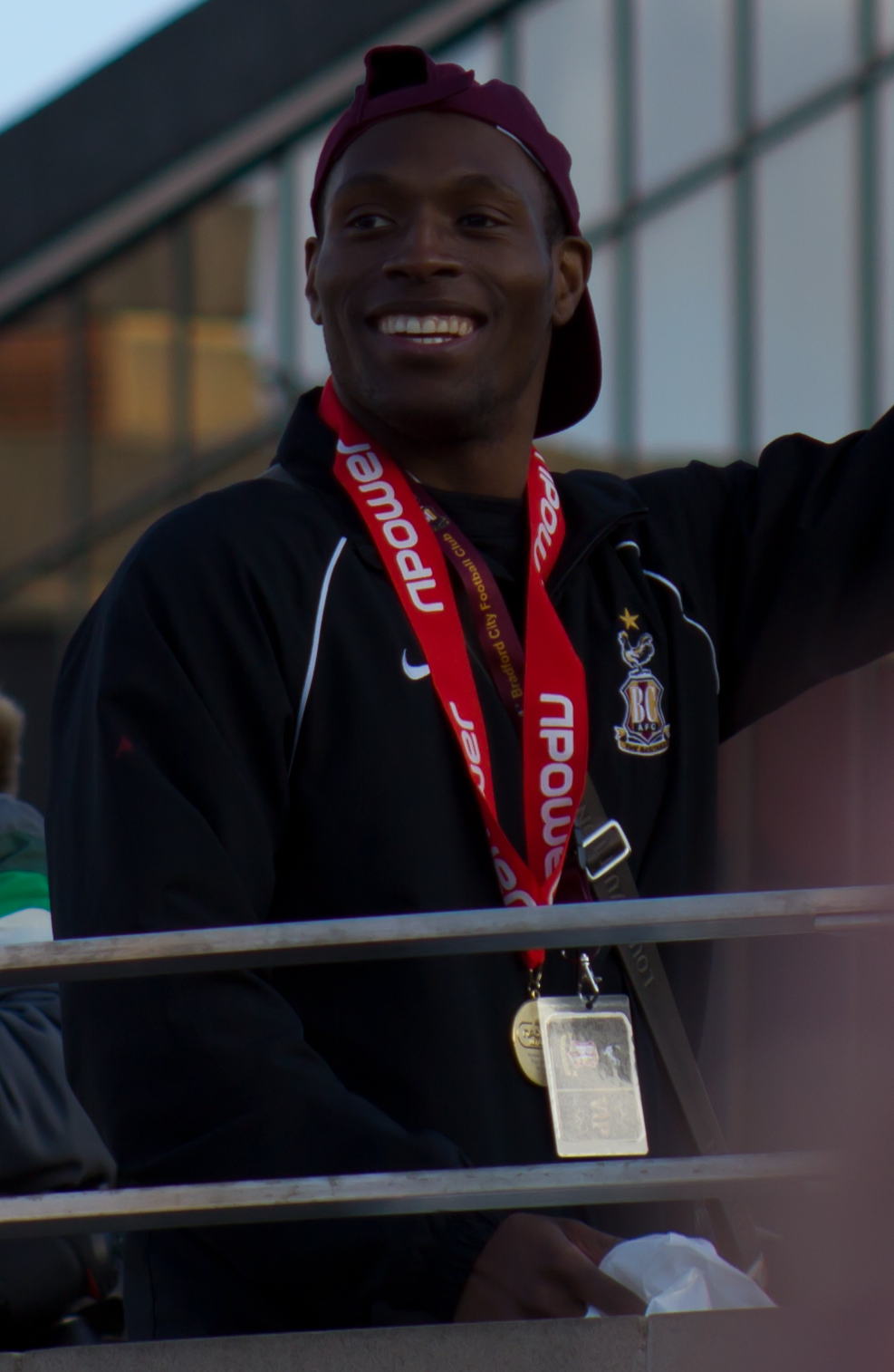
- Reid with the victory parade that followed Bradford City's victory in the 2013 Football League Two play-off final

Personal information
- Full name: Kyel Romane Reid
- Date of birth: 26 November 1987 (age 38)
- Place of birth: Deptford, England
- Height: 5 ft 10 in (1.78 m)
- Position: Winger

Youth career
- –2004: West Ham United

Senior career*
| Years | Team | Apps | (Gls) |
| 2004–2009 | West Ham United | 3 | (0) |
| 2006–2007 | → Barnsley (loan) | 26 | (2) |
| 2008 | → Crystal Palace (loan) | 2 | (0) |
| 2008 | → Blackpool (loan) | 7 | (0) |
| 2009 | → Wolverhampton Wanderers (loan) | 8 | (1) |
| 2009–2010 | Sheffield United | 7 | (0) |
| 2010 | → Charlton Athletic (loan) | 18 | (4) |
| 2010–2011 | Charlton Athletic | 32 | (1) |
| 2011–2014 | Bradford City | 96 | (10) |
| 2014–2016 | Preston North End | 15 | (0) |
| 2015–2016 | → Bradford City (loan) | 34 | (3) |
| 2016–2018 | Coventry City | 41 | (2) |
| 2017–2018 | → Colchester United (loan) | 17 | (3) |
| 2018–2019 | Chesterfield | 25 | (0) |
| 2019–2020 | Sutton United | 21 | (0) |
| 2020–2021 | Billericay Town | 13 | (1) |
| 2021 | Walton Casuals | 1 | (0) |
| 2021–2022 | Cray Wanderers | 20 | (3) |
| 2022–2023 | Beaconsfield Town | 26 | (7) |
| 2023–2024 | Rayners Lane | | |

International career
| 2004 | England U17 | 9 | (2) |
| 2006 | England U18 | 15 | (1) |
| 2007 | England U19 | 14 | (1) |
- * Club domestic league appearances and goals as of 21:42, 19 August 2023 (UTC)

Kyel Romane Reid (born 26 November 1987) is an English professional footballer who last played as a winger for Rayners Lane.

== Career ==
=== West Ham ===
Born in South London, Reid joined West Ham United in July 2004 and is a product of the West Ham United academy system. He made his full debut for the club in a 1–0 away win over West Bromwich Albion in May 2006 and made a second appearance against Tottenham Hotspur later in the same month.

He joined Barnsley in November 2006 on an initial one-month loan, which was extended to the end of the season, and made 26 appearances, scoring two goals. He returned to West Ham for the start of the 2007–08 season, making four league and cup appearances, before joining Crystal Palace on loan in March 2008.

Reid scored his first and only goal for West Ham United in a 4–1 win against Macclesfield Town during a League Cup second round match on 27 August 2008.

On 27 November 2008, Reid signed on loan with Blackpool, and made his debut two days later in the Seasiders' 2–1 victory over Plymouth Argyle at Home Park. Following Blackpool's 0–0 draw at Nottingham Forest on 13 December, two days later he was named by the Football League in the Championship "Team Of The Week". At the end of his loan spell, on 30 December, Reid returned to West Ham.

On 15 January 2009, Reid joined Championship side Wolverhampton Wanderers on loan for the remainder of the season, making his debut on 24 January 2009, in a FA Cup 4th Round tie against Middlesbrough. Reid's only goal for Wolves came in a 1–1 draw at Barnsley on 25 April 2009; a goal which secured the 2008–09 championship title for Wolves.

Reid did not make the bench for the May fixtures and returned to West Ham after the end of the season. However, he found himself behind Junior Stanislas, Jack Collison and the then-injured Valon Behrami in the pecking order for the wide midfield positions.

=== Sheffield United ===
Reid rejected a new contract offered to him by West Ham after failing to break into their first team on a regular basis. He completed a free transfer to Sheffield United in July 2009 but found it difficult to break into the first team, making only a handful of substitute appearances during his first six months at Bramall Lane.

=== Charlton Athletic ===
In January 2010 Reid was loaned out to former Premier League side Charlton Athletic for the remainder of the League One season. He was given the number 24 shirt; previously worn by Jon Fortune during Charlton's seven year Premier League stay. He scored his first goal for Charlton Athletic in a 2–0 win over Yeovil Town on 20 February 2010. Reid played a part in helping Charlton reach the League One Playoff Semi Finals (Charlton Athletic had finished the season in fourth position; just two points behind Leeds United who achieved automatic promotion as runners-up); scoring four goals in seventeen league appearances during his loan spell. Charlton were eventually knocked out of the playoffs after they lost on penalties to Swindon Town at The Valley; a game in which Reid played 95 mins: being replaced by midfielder Therry Racon in extra time. Reid became very popular with the Charlton fans during his seventeen-game spell at the club; and was recognisable, along with teammates Lloyd Sam and Therry Racon, for his bright coloured boots.

On 16 July 2010 it was announced that Charlton Athletic had signed Reid on a free transfer to keep him at The Valley on a permanent basis for the 2010/2011 League One season. Manager Phil Parkinson hailed the transfer as "an important signing" and highlighted Reid's desire to stay at Charlton, reporting that he had turned down offers from Championship clubs. Reid was given the number 11 squad number, vacated after the departure of Charlton youth product Lloyd Sam, ahead of the start of his second season at the club. Reid started the 2010–11 season well with an assist in the opening fixture as Charlton beat AFC Bournemouth 1–0 at The Valley with ten men after Jose Semedo had been dismissed in the second half. In May 2011 it was announced that Reid would not be offered a new contract and would be released at the end of the 2010–11 season.

=== Bradford City ===
On 30 August 2011, newly appointed Bradford manager Phil Parkinson made Reid his first signing, handing him a two-year contract. He made his debut in a 1–1 draw with Morecambe. His first goal for the club came when he opened the scoring against Crawley Town on 17 September. On 1 October he scored his second goal for the club and got an assist against Burton Albion. He tore his hamstring in a 3–0 win against Crewe and it was projected that he would be out for around 6 weeks. On 18 February 2012 he created a goal for Craig Fagan and scored himself in the space of 3 minutes as Bradford came from behind to beat Torquay United 2–1 at Plainmoor. He scored his next goal two games later in a 4–0 away win against Barnet. After his Man of the Match performance against Gillingham, he was named in the Football League Team of the Week on 26 March 2012. On 28 August 2012, he scored in a 2–1 win against Watford in the Football League Cup. On 18 September he helped Bradford to their best start to a league season at home since 1957, after scoring in a 3–1 win against Morecambe. After tearing his anterior cruciate ligament on 18 January 2014 in a 2–2 draw against Sheffield United, it was announced that Reid would be out for the remainder of the season.

=== Preston North End ===
On 24 June 2014, Reid signed for League One side Preston North End on a two-year deal. He returned to Bradford City on a one-month loan deal in October 2015.

=== Coventry City ===
On 28 July 2016, Kyel Reid signed for Coventry City on a two-year contract following his release from Preston North End. He scored his first goal for the club in a 2–1 loss to Gillingham on 24 September 2016.

On 7 August 2017, Reid joined Coventry's League Two rivals Colchester United on loan until January 2018. He made his Colchester debut against Aston Villa in the EFL Cup on 9 August. He scored his first Colchester goal on 26 August against Forest Green Rovers.

He was released by Coventry at the end of the 2017–18 season.

=== Chesterfield ===
Reid joined Chesterfield on 16 August 2018, signing a contract until the end of the 2018–19 season.

=== Sutton United ===
On 26 August 2020, Reid left Sutton United at the end of the 2019–20 season.

== International career ==
Born in England, Reid is of Jamaican descent and holds dual British-English citizenship. He has played for the England under-17, under-18 and under-19 teams.

== Career statistics ==
As of match played 18 February 2023

Appearances and goals by club, season and competition
| Club | Season | League | | | National Cup | | League Cup | | Other | | Total | |
| Club | Season | Division | Apps | Goals | Apps | Goals | Apps | Goals | Apps | Goals | Apps | Goals |
|---|---|---|---|---|---|---|---|---|---|---|---|---|
| West Ham United | 2005–06 | Premier League | 2 | 0 | 0 | 0 | 0 | 0 | 0 | 0 | 2 | 0 |
| West Ham United | 2006–07 | Premier League | 0 | 0 | 0 | 0 | 1 | 0 | 0 | 0 | 1 | 0 |
| West Ham United | 2007–08 | Premier League | 1 | 0 | 1 | 0 | 2 | 0 | 0 | 0 | 4 | 0 |
| West Ham United | 2008–09 | Premier League | 0 | 0 | 0 | 0 | 2 | 1 | 0 | 0 | 2 | 1 |
| West Ham United | Total | | 3 | 0 | 1 | 0 | 5 | 1 | 0 | 0 | 9 | 1 |
| Barnsley (loan) | 2006–07 | Championship | 26 | 2 | 0 | 0 | 0 | 0 | 0 | 0 | 26 | 2 |
| Crystal Palace (loan) | 2007–08 | Championship | 2 | 0 | 0 | 0 | 0 | 0 | 0 | 0 | 2 | 0 |
| Blackpool (loan) | 2008–09 | Championship | 7 | 0 | 0 | 0 | 0 | 0 | 0 | 0 | 7 | 0 |
| Wolverhampton Wanderers (loan) | 2008–09 | Championship | 8 | 1 | 1 | 0 | 0 | 0 | 0 | 0 | 9 | 1 |
| Sheffield United | 2009–10 | Championship | 7 | 0 | 0 | 0 | 1 | 0 | 0 | 0 | 8 | 0 |
| Charlton Athletic (loan) | 2009–10 | League One | 18 | 4 | 0 | 0 | 0 | 0 | 0 | 0 | 18 | 4 |
| Charlton Athletic | 2010–11 | League One | 32 | 1 | 4 | 1 | 1 | 0 | 4 (Note: Appearances in Football League Trophy) | 0 | 41 | 2 |
| Bradford City | 2011–12 | League Two | 37 | 4 | 1 | 0 | 0 | 0 | 2 | 0 | 40 | 4 |
| Bradford City | 2012–13 | League Two | 33 | 2 | 1 | 1 | 3 | 1 | 4 (Note: One Appearance in Football League Trophy and Three Appearances in 2013 Football League play-offs) | 1 (Note: Goal in Football League Trophy) | 41 | 5 |
| Bradford City | 2013–14 | League One | 26 | 4 | 1 | 0 | 1 | 0 | 1 | 0 | 29 | 4 |
| Bradford City | Total | | 96 | 10 | 3 | 1 | 4 | 1 | 7 | 1 | 110 | 13 |
| Preston North End | 2014–15 | League One | 14 | 0 | 6 | 0 | 0 | 0 | 6 | 0 | 26 | 0 |
| Preston North End | 2015–16 | Championship | 1 | 0 | 0 | 0 | 2 | 0 | 0 | 0 | 3 | 0 |
| Preston North End | Total | | 15 | 0 | 6 | 0 | 2 | 0 | 6 | 0 | 29 | 0 |
| Bradford City (loan) | 2015–16 | League One | 34 | 3 | 3 | 1 | 0 | 0 | 2 (Note: Appearances in 2016 Football League play-offs) | 0 | 39 | 4 |
| Coventry City | 2016–17 | League One | 29 | 2 | 3 | 0 | 2 | 0 | 3 (Note: Appearances in EFL Trophy) | 0 | 37 | 2 |
| Coventry City | 2017–18 | League Two | 12 | 0 | 0 | 0 | 0 | 0 | 1 (Note: Appearance in Football League play-offs) | 0 | 13 | 0 |
| Coventry City | Total | | 41 | 2 | 3 | 0 | 2 | 0 | 4 | 0 | 50 | 2 |
| Colchester United (loan) | 2017–18 | League Two | 17 | 3 | 1 | 0 | 1 | 0 | 0 | 0 | 19 | 3 |
| Chesterfield | 2018–19 | National League | 25 | 0 | 2 | 0 | 0 | 0 | 0 | 0 | 27 | 0 |
| Sutton United | 2019–20 | National League | 21 | 0 | 0 | 0 | 0 | 0 | 0 | 0 | 21 | 0 |
| Billericay Town | 2020–21 | National League South | 13 | 1 | 0 | 0 | 0 | 0 | 0 | 0 | 13 | 1 |
| Walton Casuals | 2021–22 | SFL Premier Division South | 1 | 0 | 0 | 0 | 0 | 0 | 0 | 0 | 1 | 0 |
| Cray Wanderers | 2021–22 | Isthmian League Premier Division | 20 | 3 | 0 | 0 | 0 | 0 | 1 (Note: One appearance in the FA Trophy) | 0 | 21 | 3 |
| Beaconsfield Town | 2022–23 | SFL Premier Division South | 26 | 7 | 0 | 0 | 0 | 0 | 0 | 0 | 26 | 7 |
| Career total | | | 412 | 37 | 25 | 3 | 16 | 2 | 25 | 1 | 478 | 43 |

== Honours ==
Bradford City

- Football League Two play-offs: 2013
- Football League Cup runner-up: 2012–13

Preston North End

- Football League One play-offs: 2015

Coventry City

- EFL League Two play-offs: 2018
- EFL Trophy: 2016–17
