= Lewis Clarkson =

English footballer

Personal information
- Full name: Lewis Anthony Clarkson
- Date of birth: 8 November 1993 (age 33)
- Place of birth: Kingston upon Hull, England
- Position: Striker

Team information
- Current team: Tadcaster Albion

Youth career
- Hull City

Senior career*
Years	Team	Apps	(Gls)
2013	Scarborough Athletic		
2013–2015	Bradford City	1	(0)
2014	→ Whitby Town (loan)		
2015	→ Ossett Town (loan)		
2015–	Tadcaster Albion		
- * Club domestic league appearances and goals as of 08:50, 15 February 2015 (UTC)

Lewis Anthony Clarkson (born 8 November 1993) is an English professional footballer who plays for Tadcaster Albion, as a striker.

== Career ==
Clarkson was one of 12 players to be released by Hull City in the summer of 2013. In August, he signed with Northern Premier League Division One South club Scarborough Athletic. During that season he scored 9 goals in 13 appearances for the club, in all competitions.

On 21 November 2013 he signed an 18-month contract with Bradford City. He made his professional debut in January 2014, playing the last three minutes of a 0–3 away loss against Notts County.

Clarkson scored two goals against Guiseley in a pre-season friendly on 12 July 2014, and a further two goals against UCD in another friendly three days later. Manager Phil Parkinson later played down the hype surrounding Clarkson's form in the pre-season friendlies. After injuring himself in another pre-season friendly, Clarkson was unable to train for two months, with club physio Matt Barrass warning that Clarkson would be subject to a lengthy rehabilitation process.

He moved on loan to Whitby Town in November 2014, and to Ossett Town in January 2015. He was released by Bradford City later that month.

He joined Tadcaster Albion in February 2015.

== Career statistics ==
As of 1 February 2015

Appearances and goals by club, season and competition
Club	Season	League		FA Cup		League Cup		Other		Total	
Club	Season	Apps	Goals	Apps	Goals	Apps	Goals	Apps	Goals	Apps	Goals
Bradford City	2013–14	1	0	0	0	0	0	0	0	1	0
Bradford City	2014–15	0	0	0	0	0	0	0	0	0	0
Career total		1	0	0	0	0	0	0	0	1	0
