= 2014–15 Bradford City A.F.C. season =

Bradford City A.F.C.
2014–15 season
- Co-chairmen: Mark Lawn and Julien Rhodes
- Manager: Phil Parkinson
- Stadium: Valley Parade
- League One: 7th
- FA Cup: Quarter-finals (eliminated by Reading)
- League Cup: Third round (eliminated by Milton Keynes Dons)
- Football League Trophy: First round (eliminated by Oldham Athletic)
- Top goalscorer: League: Billy Clarke (13); All: Billy Clarke (14)
- Highest home attendance: 24,321 vs. Reading (FA Cup)
- Lowest home attendance: 5,373 vs. Dartford (FA Cup)
- Average home league attendance: 15,639
Home colours	Away colours	Third colours

The 2014–15 season was Bradford City's 112th season in their history, their 100th in the Football League and 102nd in the league system of English football. It was their second season back in League One after finishing 11th in the previous year.

== Pre-season news ==
After finishing 11th in the 2013–14 Football League One campaign the Bantams kept the majority of the squad for this season. However captain Gary Jones, winger Garry Thompson, midfielder Nathan Doyle, defenders Matthew Bates and Nathan Curtis were all released along with youth players Jack Stockdill, Louie Swain and Jack Bentley.

Bradford signed midfielder Matthew Dolan on a one-year permanent deal after spending the 2013–14 season on loan from Middlesbrough. Also defender Rory McArdle signed a new 3-year deal with the club. Midfielder Billy Knott signed for Bradford on a 2-year deal after being released from Sunderland, who is described as a 'high-intensity' and 'high-energy' styled player. Bradford made their 3rd summer signing ahead of the new campaign by signing midfielder Gary Liddle, after he was released by Notts County. Defender Stephen Darby signed a new 3-year deal with the club, who was also appointed as the club's new captain for the 2014–15 season.

It was announced that Blackburn Rovers would visit the Bantams in a pre-season friendly. A day after this news was announced the annual match against Guiseley was revealed to be played on 15 July. Bradford will also travel to Northern Ireland for a pre-season tour as they did in the previous year. There they will face University College Dublin and Shelbourne.

Another pre-season friendly match was confirmed on 29 May, it was announced the club would travel to Morecambe's Globe Arena on 2 August. That will be the first of two matches played within just over a week between the two clubs after they were both drawn together for the first round of the Football League Cup, which will be played in the week commencing 11 August again at the Globe Arena.

== Pre-season and friendlies ==
Date	Opponents	H / A	Result F–A	Scorers	Attendance
12 July 2014	Guiseley	A	3–0	Clarkson (2) 13', 44', Dolan 27'	—
15 July 2014	U.C.D	A	2–3	Clarkson (2) 41', 54'	—
19 July 2014	Shelbourne	A	4–0	Sheehan 22' (pen.), Clarke (2) 29', 53', De Vita 76'	—
26 July 2014	Blackburn Rovers	H	0–0	—	—
2 August 2014	Hartlepool United	A	1–1	Clarke 72'	—

== League One ==
=== Matches ===
The fixtures for the 2014–15 season were announced on 18 June 2014 at 9am.

The first game of the season saw City host Coventry City, the Bantams took the lead through a James Hanson goal however Coventry battled back to equalize through Reda Johnson. Bradford were awarded a penalty which Alan Sheehan converted, Johnson then netted for Coventry in the 89th minute only for Hanson to score a header from a Jason Kennedy cross in the 90th minute to ensure Bradford won their opening game for the first time in 6 years. The next game against Walsall ended with a 0–0 draw however the following game saw the Bantams win 3–1 against Crawley Town, Bradford took a lead early in the second half through a Hanson goal. Crawley equalized shortly after through Joe Walsh. Billy Knott fired the Bantams ahead before Mason Bennett wrapped the game up with a 3rd goal for Bradford. However the unbeaten run was short lived as Peterborough United came away with a 1–0 victory with City unable to score. Bradford's final game in August was a 2–0 win over Rochdale. Rochdale went close early on but former player Jason Kennedy slotted home a scrappy goal to give the Bantams the lead, 6 minutes later Hanson scored his 4th league goal of the season to ensure that City came away with the points.

Date	Opponents	H/A	Result F–A	Scorers	Attendance	League position
9 August 2014	Coventry City	H	3–2	Hanson (2) 27', 90', Sheehan 49' (pen.)	14,621	4th
16 August 2014	Walsall	A	0–0		4,520	8th
19 August 2014	Crawley Town	A	3–1	Hanson 49', Knott 62', Bennett 77'	2,225	2nd
23 August 2014	Peterborough United	H	0–1		13,546	8th
30 August 2014	Rochdale	A	2–0	Kennedy 60', Hanson 66'	4,758	4th
6 September 2014	Yeovil Town	H	1–3	McArdle 26'	12,601	5th
13 September 2014	Swindon Town	H	1–2	Thompson 10' (o.g.)	12,486	8th
16 September 2014	Milton Keynes Dons	A	2–1	McLean 24', Clarke 26'	7,139	5th
20 September 2014	Colchester United	A	0–0		3,524	6th
27 September 2014	Port Vale	H	1–1	Yeates 45'	12,703	9th
4 October 2014	Crewe Alexandra	H	2–0	McLean 72', Liddle 74'	12,386	7th
12 October 2014	Barnsley	A	1–3	Kennedy 1'	10,499	7th
18 October 2014	Sheffield United	H	0–2		14,784	11th
21 October 2014	Bristol City	A	2–2	Clarke 20', Routis 85'	12,548	12th
25 October 2014	Oldham Athletic	A	1–2	Halliday 45'	5,832	12th
1 November 2014	Doncaster Rovers	H	1–2	Stead 45'	13,348	14th
15 November 2014	Preston North End	A	2–1	McArdle 26', Yeates 86'	10,302	13th
22 November 2014	Gillingham	H	1–1	Legge 56' (o.g.)	12,434	12th
29 November 2014	Leyton Orient	H	3–1	Knott 42', Clarke 79', Stead 81'	12,489	10th
13 December 2014	Chesterfield	A	1–0	Clarke 57'	6,809	10th
20 December 2014	Scunthorpe United	H	1–1	McArdle 32'	12,831	8th
26 December 2014	Fleetwood Town	A	2–0	Hanson 42', Morais 81'	4,278	5th
28 December 2014	Notts County	H	1–0	Knott 41'	14,518	5th
10 January 2015	Rochdale	H	1–2	Stead 32'	13,571	5th
17 January 2015	Yeovil Town	A	0–1		4,009	6th
31 January 2015	Colchester United	H	1–1	Morais 77'	13,917	8th
7 February 2015	Port Vale	A	2–2	Hanson 41', Morais 65'	5,205	9th
9 February 2015	Milton Keynes Dons	H	2–1	Clarke 57', Hanson 70'	11,948	6th
18 February 2015	Leyton Orient	A	2–0	Hanson (2) 21', 32'	4,760	7th
21 February 2015	Walsall	H	1–1	Clarke 51'	13,534	6th
24 February 2015	Swindon Town	A	1–2	Clarke 54'	6,812	6th
28 February 2015	Peterborough United	A	0–2		6,494	8th
3 March 2015	Crawley Town	H	1–0	Zoko 9'	11,683	8th
10 March 2015	Coventry City	A	1–1	Yeates 69'	8,566	9th
14 March 2015	Notts County	A	1–1	Stead 45'	5,166	9th
21 March 2015	Fleetwood Town	H	2–2	Stead 10', Routis 50'	12,963	12th
28 March 2015	Oldham Athletic	H	2–0	Clarke (2) 71', 90'	14,010	10th
31 March 2015	Chesterfield	H	0–1		12,551	10th
3 April 2015	Doncaster Rovers	A	3–0	MacKenzie 55', Clarke 64', McMahon 90'	8,592	7th
6 April 2015	Preston North End	H	0–3		16,032	9th
11 April 2015	Gillingham	A	0–1		5,221	9th
14 April 2015	Bristol City	H	0–6		12,609	11th
18 April 2015	Sheffield United	A	1–1	Clarke 83'	21,879	12th
21 April 2015	Scunthorpe United	A	1–1	Clarke 63'	3,176	10th
25 April 2015	Barnsley	H	1–0	Stead 17'	15,560	8th
3 May 2015	Crewe Alexandra	A	1–0	Clarke 23'	7,608	7th

=== League table ===
Pos	Team	Pld	W	D	L	GF	GA	GD	Pts	Promotion, qualification or relegation
5	Sheffield United	46	19	14	13	66	53	+13	71	Qualification for League One play-offs (Note: Four teams play for one spot and promotion to Football League Championship.)
6	Chesterfield	46	19	12	15	68	55	+13	69	Qualification for League One play-offs
7	Bradford City	46	17	14	15	55	55	0	65	
8	Rochdale	46	19	6	21	72	66	+6	63	
9	Peterborough United	46	18	9	19	53	56	−3	63	

Updated to match(es) played on 3 May 2015. Source: BBC Sport
Rules for classification: 1) Points; 2) Goal difference; 3) Number of goals scored

== FA Cup ==
Date	Round	Opponents	H / A	Result F–A	Scorers	Attendance
9 November 2014	Round 1	Halifax Town	A	2–1	Stead 50', Morais 53'	8,042
7 December 2014	Round 2	Dartford	H	4–1	Clarke 10', Stead 31', Morais 58', Yeates 59'	5,373
3 January 2015	Round 3	Millwall	A	3–3	Knott (2) 6', 76', Nelson 70' (o.g.)	5,470
14 January 2015	Replay	Millwall	H	4–0	Hanson 8', Stead 17', Halliday 39', Knott 57'	11,859
24 January 2015	Round 4	Chelsea	A	4–2	Stead 41', Morais 75', Halliday 82', Yeates 90+4'	41,014
15 February 2015	Round 5	Sunderland	H	2–0	O'Shea 3' (o.g.), Stead 61'	24,021
7 March 2015	Round 6	Reading	H	0–0		24,321
16 March 2015	Replay	Reading	A	0–3		22,908

== League Cup ==
The draw for the first round was made on 17 June 2014 at 10am. Bradford City were drawn at away to Morecambe.

Round 1 saw the Bantams take on Morecambe at the Globe Arena, a hard-fought game was decided in the last 10 minutes as Aaron McLean came off the bench to score the winner for Bradford. The second round draw saw Bradford pulled out alongside arch rivals Leeds United at Valley Parade. The Bantams went 1–0 down late in the game to 10 men Leeds however a 20-yard strike from Billy Knott a minute later leveled the score before James Hanson score the winner another 2 minutes later.

Date	Round	Opponents	H / A	Result F–A	Scorers	Attendance
12 August 2014	Round 1	Morecambe	A	1–0	McLean 83'	2,395
27 August 2014	Round 2	Leeds United	H	2–1	Knott 84', Hanson 86'	18,750
23 September 2014	Round 3	Milton Keynes Dons	A	0–2		5,707

== Football League Trophy ==
Bradford were drawn against Oldham Athletic in the Football League Trophy. Bradford fielded a changed side from recent weeks and were unable to overcome the League One side eventually going out of the cup thanks to a late winner from substitute Jordan Bove.

Date	Round	Opponents	H / A	Result F–A	Scorers	Attendance
2 September 2014	Round 1	Oldham Athletic	A	0–1		2,535

== Squad statistics ==
No.	Pos.	Name	League		FA Cup		League Cup		League Trophy		Total		Discipline	
No.	Pos.	Name	Apps	Goals	Apps	Goals	Apps	Goals	Apps	Goals	Apps	Goals	Yellow card	Red card
1	GK	(England) Jak Alnwick	1	0	0	0	0	0	0	0	1	0	0	0
2	DF	(England) Stephen Darby	45	0	8	0	2	0	1	0	56	0	7	1
3	DF	(Australia) James Meredith	38(2)	0	8	0	3	0	1	0	50(2)	0	5	0
4	MF	(England) Matthew Dolan	3(10)	0	0(2)	0	1(1)	0	1	0	5(13)	0	2	0
5	DF	(England) Andrew Davies	28	0	6	0	0	0	0	0	34	0	6	0
6	DF	(Republic of Ireland) Alan Sheehan	13(10)	1	3	0	2	0	1	0	19(10)	1	4	1
7	FW	(England) Aaron McLean	7(6)	2	0	0	1(2)	1	1	0	9(8)	3	1	0
8	MF	(England) Gary Liddle	39(2)	1	7	0	2	0	0	0	48(2)	1	11	0
9	FW	(England) James Hanson	31(7)	9	6(1)	1	2	1	0(1)	0	39(9)	11	2	0
10	FW	(Republic of Ireland) Billy Clarke	32(4)	13	3(3)	1	3	0	0(1)	0	38(8)	14	7	0
11	MF	(England) Billy Knott	31(9)	3	8	3	2(1)	1	0	0	41(10)	7	4	0
12	GK	(England) Ben Williams	12(2)	0	8	0	3	0	0	0	23(2)	0	0	0
13	FW	(Ivory Coast) Francois Zoko	3(13)	1	0(5)	0	0	0	0	0	3(18)	1	4	0
14	MF	(Republic of Ireland) Mark Yeates	26(14)	3	2(5)	2	1	0	1	0	30(19)	5	4	0
15	DF	(Scotland) Gary MacKenzie	9(2)	1	0	0	0	0	0	0	9(2)	1	1	0
16	FW	(England) Jon Stead	27(5)	6	8	5	0	0	0	0	35(5)	11	2	0
17	MF	(England) Jason Kennedy	17(3)	2	1(1)	0	3	0	1	0	22(4)	2	3	0
18	DF	(France) Christopher Routis	16(2)	2	0(3)	0	1	0	1	0	18(5)	2	3	1
19	FW	(England) Oli McBurnie	0(7)	0	0(1)	0	1(1)	0	1	0	2(9)	0	0	0
20	MF	(Portugal) Filipe Morais	22(8)	3	8	3	2	0	0	0	32(8)	6	5	1
22	GK	(England) Matthew Urwin	0	0	0	0	0(1)	0	0	0	0(1)	0	0	0
23	DF	(Northern Ireland) Rory McArdle	43	3	7(1)	0	3	0	1	0	54(1)	3	8	2
24	MF	(England) Oliver Burke	2	0	0	0	0	0	0	0	2	0	0	0
25	MF	(Scotland) Andy Halliday	20(5)	1	5(2)	2	0	0	0	0	25(7)	3	3	0
28	FW	(England) Mason Bennett	5(6)	1	0	0	1	0	0(1)	0	6(7)	1	0	0
29	DF	(England) Tony McMahon	4(4)	1	0	0	0	0	0	0	4(4)	1	2	0
34	FW	(England) Reece Webb-Foster	0(1)	0	0	0	0(1)	0	0	0	0(2)	0	0	0
36	MF	(England) Dylan Mottley-Henry	0(1)	0	0	0	0	0	0	0	0(1)	0	0	0
-	FW	(Burundi) Mo Shariff	0(1)	0	0	0	0(1)	0	0	0	0(2)	0	0	0
-	GK	(England) Jordan Pickford	33	0	0	0	0	0	1	0	34	0	1	2
-	–	Own goals	–	2	–	2	–	0	–	0	–	4	–	–

Statistics accurate as of 3 May 2015

== Transfers ==
=== In ===
Date	Pos.	Name	From	Fee	Ref
16 May 2014	MF	(England) Matthew Dolan	(England) Middlesbrough	Free	
30 May 2014	MF	(England) Billy Knott	(England) Sunderland	Free	
9 June 2014	MF	(England) Gary Liddle	(England) Notts County	Free	
19 June 2014	DF	(Republic of Ireland) Alan Sheehan	(England) Notts County	Free	
27 June 2014	FW	(Republic of Ireland) Billy Clarke	(England) Crawley Town	Free	
5 August 2014	GK	(England) Ben Williams	(Scotland) Hibernian	Free	
5 August 2014	FW	(Burundi) Mo Shariff	(England) Queens Park Rangers	Free	
5 August 2014	GK	(England) Matthew Urwin	(England) Blackburn Rovers	Free	
8 August 2014	MF	(Portugal) Filipe Morais	(England) Stevenage	Free	
8 August 2014	DF	(Switzerland) Christopher Routis	(Switzerland) Servette	Free	
26 January 2015	MF	(Scotland) Andy Halliday	(England) Middlesbrough	Undisclosed	

=== Loan In ===
Date	Pos.	Name	From	Until
21 July 2014	GK	(England) Jordan Pickford	(England) Sunderland	30 June 2015
12 August 2014	FW	(England) Mason Bennett	(England) Derby County	14 October 2014
17 October 2014	FW	(England) Jon Stead	(England) Huddersfield Town	30 June 2015
17 October 2014	MF	(Scotland) Andy Halliday	(England) Middlesbrough	26 January 2015
22 November 2014	FW	(Ivory Coast) Francois Zoko	(England) Blackpool	30 June 2015
2 February 2015	DF	(Scotland) Gary MacKenzie	(England) Blackpool	30 June 2015
24 February 2015	MF	(England) Oliver Burke	(England) Nottingham Forest	24 March 2015
13 March 2015	GK	(England) Jak Alnwick	(England) Newcastle United	30 June 2015

=== Loan Out ===
Date	Pos.	Name	To	Until
18 November 2014	FW	(England) Aaron McLean	(England) Peterborough United	30 June 2015
27 November 2014	MF	(England) Matthew Dolan	(England) Hartlepool United	31 December 2014
22 January 2015	FW	(Scotland) Oli McBurnie	(England) Chester	19 February 2015
12 March 2015	MF	(England) Jason Kennedy	(England) Carlisle United	11 April 2015
26 March 2015	DF	(Republic of Ireland) Alan Sheehan	(England) Peterborough United	30 June 2015

=== Out ===
Date	Pos.	Name	To	Fee	Ref
7 May 2014	MF	(England) Garry Thompson	(England) Notts County	Free	
7 May 2014	DF	(England) Matthew Bates	(England) Hartlepool United	Free	
7 May 2014	FW	(England) Louie Swain	Released	Free	
7 May 2014	GK	(England) Jack Stockdill	(England) Guiseley	Free	
7 May 2014	GK	(England) Jack Bentley	Released	Free	
7 May 2014	DF	(England) Nathan Curtis	(England) Ossett Town	Free	
9 May 2014	MF	(England) Gary Jones	(England) Notts County	Free	
9 June 2014	MF	(England) Nathan Doyle	(England) Luton Town	Free	
16 June 2014	DF	(Republic of Ireland) Carl McHugh	(England) Plymouth Argyle	Free	
24 June 2014	MF	(England) Kyel Reid	(England) Preston North End	Free	
22 July 2014	GK	(Scotland) Jon McLaughlin	(England) Burton Albion	Free	
25 July 2014	DF	(England) Matt Taylor	(England) Cheltenham Town	Free	

== See also ==
- List of Bradford City A.F.C. seasons
