= 2011–12 Watford F.C. season =

English football team season

Watford
2011–12 season
- Chairman: Graham Taylor
- Manager: Sean Dyche
- Stadium: Vicarage Road
- Football League Championship: 11th
- FA Cup: Fourth round (eliminated by Tottenham Hotspur)
- League Cup: First round (eliminated by Bristol Rovers)
- Top goalscorer: League: Troy Deeney: 11; All: Troy Deeney: 12
- Highest home attendance: 16,314 (vs. Blackpool, 6 April 2012)
- Lowest home attendance: 10,592 (vs Millwall, 27 September 2011)
Home colours	Away colours

Watford Football Club (also known simply as Watford, or as The Hornets) is an English football club from Watford, Hertfordshire. The team competed in the EFL Championship in 2011–12, their fifth consecutive season in the second tier of English football since their relegation from the Premier League in 2006–07. The 2011–12 season consisted of pre-season friendlies in July 2011, followed by competitive matches in the Football League, FA Cup and EFL Cup between August 2011 and April 2012. Assistant manager Sean Dyche became manager in July 2011, following the departure of Malky Mackay. The club's captain for the season was central midfielder John Eustace. Watford's chairman was Graham Taylor, who previously took Watford from the Fourth Division to the First Division as manager.

The team was widely tipped for relegation in 2011–12, following the pre-season departures of attacking players Danny Graham, Will Buckley and Don Cowie for a combined total of £4.5million. Following an early run of two wins from the first thirteen league fixtures, Watford's form improved, and the team lost just one of the remaining eleven games in 2011. Watford suffered four defeats in January 2012, and sold Marvin Sordell – then the team's top goalscorer – on the last day of the January transfer window. The team regained its form between February and April, and finished the league season in the top half of the table for the first time in four years. Watford's top scorer was Troy Deeney with 12 goals in all competitions, followed by Sordell with 10. Centre back Adrian Mariappa was voted Watford F.C. Player of the Season, while Sean Murray received the young player award.

Off the field, 2011 and 2012 marked a period of transition. Laurence Bassini purchased the club in March 2011, and after the 2010–11 season several senior members of staff left the club, including chief executive Julian Winter and manager Malky Mackay. Bassini himself attracted criticism from some Watford supporters, as well as chairman Graham Taylor, for his reluctance to speak to supporters or the media. Taylor resigned as chairman at the end of the season, and in June 2012 a company owned by Giampaolo Pozzo and his family took control of the club.

== Background ==
The end of the 2010–11 season signalled the start of a period of change, on and off the pitch. Watford sold the club's top scorer Danny Graham to newly promoted Swansea City for £3.5 million. They also sold Young Player of the season Will Buckley to Brighton & Hove Albion for £1m, and Liam Henderson left on a free transfer to York City. Off the field, Watford's chief executive Julian Winter left the club shortly after the sales of Buckley and Graham, and manager Malky Mackay joined Cardiff City the following week. On 21 June, 20-year-old defender Tom Aldred left on a season-long loan to Inverness Caledonian Thistle and Nathan Ellington went on a free transfer to Ipswich Town. Meanwhile, on the same day, Craig Forsyth came to Watford from Dundee United and Sean Dyche was appointed as new manager.

== Pre-season friendlies ==
9 July 2011	Boreham Wood	2–2	Watford	Meadow Park
15:00	Noto 12'; Chabaan 40'		Eustace 30'; Mingoia 48'

19 July 2011	Wealdstone	1–3	Watford	St Georges Stadium
19:45	Jolly (?)		Yeates (?); Iwelumo (?); Sordell (?)

23 July 2011	AFC Wimbledon	2–1	Watford	Kingsmeadow
15:00	L. Moore 40', 55'		Eustace 13'	Attendance: 1,613

26 July 2011	Brentford	0–0	Watford	Griffin Park
19:45				Attendance: 2,491

30 July 2011	Colchester United	1–0	Watford	Weston Homes Community Stadium
15:00	Odejayi 25'

== Championship ==
6 August 2011 1	Burnley	2–2	Watford	Turf Moor
15:00	Austin 77'; Treacy 84'		45' Forsyth; 70' Yeates	Attendance: 14,617

13 August 2011 2	Watford	0–1	Derby County	Vicarage Road
15:00			51' S. Davies	Attendance: 12,263

16 August 2011 3	Watford	0–4	West Ham United	Vicarage Road
19:45			3' Tomkins; 45+2' O'Brien; 71' Cole; 90+1' Parker	Attendance: 14,747

20 August 2011 4	Coventry City	0–0	Watford	Ricoh Arena
15:00				Attendance: 13,043

28 August 2011 5	Watford	2–2	Birmingham City	Vicarage Road
15:00	Sordell 80'; Taylor 90+1'		39' Rooney; 88' Wood	Attendance: 11,937

10 September 2011 6	Reading	0–2	Watford	Madejski Stadium
15:00			12' Yeates; 51' Eustace	Attendance: 17,128

17 September 2011 7	Barnsley	1–1	Watford	Oakwell
15:00	Gray 57'		37' Sordell	Attendance: 9,733

24 September 2011 8	Watford	0–1	Nottingham Forest	Vicarage Road
15:00			61' Miller	Attendance: 11,437

27 September 2011 9	Watford	2–1	Millwall	Vicarage Road
19:45	Dickinson 78'; Forsyth 85'		68' Feeney	Attendance: 10,592

1 October 2011 10	Southampton	4–0	Watford	St Mary's Stadium
15:00	Lambert 22' (pen.), 55' (pen.) do Prado 70'; Holmes 88'			Attendance: 23,574

15 October 2011 11	Watford	0–2	Crystal Palace	Vicarage Road
15:00			Zaha 66'; Easter 90+2'	Attendance: 12,559

19 October 2011 12	Leicester City	2–0	Watford	King Power Stadium
19:45	Nugent 19'; Beckford 36'			Attendance: 20,304

22 October 2011 13	Hull City	3–2	Watford	KC Stadium
15:00	Fryatt 51'; Mclean 66'; Koren 90+4'		36' (o.g.) Chester; 56' Iwelumo	Attendance: 18,324

29 October 2011 14	Watford	3–2	Peterborough United	Vicarage Road
15:00	Yeates 5'; Sordell 31' (pen.), 33'		15' Frecklington; 39' Sinclair	Attendance: 15,031

1 November 2011 15	Watford	1–0	Brighton & Hove Albion	Vicarage Road
19:45	Deeney 77'			Attendance: 11,818

5 November 2011 16	Middlesbrough	1–0	Watford	Riverside Stadium
17:20	McDonald 41'			Attendance: 14,366

19 November 2011 17	Watford	2–0	Portsmouth	Vicarage Road
15:00	Kightly 2'; Sordell 45'			Attendance: 12,864

26 November 2011 18	Doncaster Rovers	0–0	Watford	Keepmoat Stadium
15:00				Attendance: 8,389

29 November 2011 19	Watford	2–2	Bristol City	Vicarage Road
19:45	Dickinson 25'; Beattie 42'		44' Elliott; 46' (o.g.) Mariappa	Attendance: 12,418

3 December 2011 20	Ipswich Town	1–2	Watford	Portman Road
15:00	Andrews 45'		70' (pen.) Sordell; 74' Deeney	Attendance: 16,262

10 December 2011 21	Watford	1–1	Leeds United	Vicarage Road
15:00	Kightly 28'		90+5' (pen.) Snodgrass	Attendance: 13,573

17 December 2011 22	Blackpool	0–0	Watford	Bloomfield Road
15:00				Attendance: 11,652

26 December 2011 23	Watford	1–1	Cardiff City	Vicarage Road
12:00	Buaben 62'		80' (o.g.) Mariappa	Attendance: 14,604

31 December 2011 24	Watford	4–1	Doncaster Rovers	Vicarage Road
13:00	Sordell 44', 68'; Eustace 84'; Kightly 90+3'		47' Sharp	Attendance: 11,654

2 January 2012 25	Portsmouth	2–0	Watford	Fratton Park
15:00	Futács 54'; Mullins 87'			Attendance: 14,362

14 January 2012 27	Watford	1–2	Reading	Vicarage Road
17:20	Cummings 29' (o.g.)		42' Kebe; 85' Le Fondre	Attendance: 11,291

21 January 2012 27	Birmingham City	3–0	Watford	St Andrew's
15:00	Davies 35', 60'; Burke 81'			Attendance: 18,681

31 January 2012 28	Millwall	0–2	Watford	The Den
19:45			35' Deeney; 59' Garner	Attendance: 9,294

4 February 2012 29	Watford	2–1	Barnsley	Vicarage Road
15:00	Eustace 33', 68'		85' Golbourne	Attendance: 11,306

11 February 2012 30	Nottingham Forest	1–1	Watford	City Ground
15:00	McCleary 19'		44' Deeney	Attendance: 21,712

14 February 2012 31	Watford	3–2	Leicester City	Vicarage Road
19:45	Mariappa 5'; Murray 33'; Forsyth 80'		11', 18' Nugent	Attendance: 11,800

18 February 2012 32	Crystal Palace	4–0	Watford	Selhurst Park
15:00	Zaha 22'; Martin 38', 50'; Dikgacoi 64'			Attendance: 13,324

25 February 2012 33	Watford	0–3	Southampton	Vicarage Road
15:00			13', 21', 72' Lambert	Attendance: 13,424

3 March 2012 34	Watford	3–2	Burnley	Vicarage Road
15:00	Nosworthy 54'; Kacaniklic 72'; Deeney 75'		41' Rodriguez; 50' (o.g.) Nosworthy	Attendance: 11,612

7 March 2012 35	West Ham United	1–1	Watford	Upton Park
19:45	Vaz Te 87'		68' Murray	Attendance: 31,674

10 March 2012 36	Derby County	1–2	Watford	Pride Park
15:00	S. Davies 31'		8' Murray; 15' Deeney	Attendance: 23,130

17 March 2012 37	Watford	0–0	Coventry City	Vicarage Road
15:00				Attendance: 12,563

20 March 2012 38	Bristol City	0–2	Watford	Ashton Gate
19:45			15' (o.g.) James; 20' Murray	Attendance: 12,017

24 March 2012 39	Watford	2–1	Ipswich Town	Vicarage Road
15:00	Murray 71'; Deeney 82'		18' Emmanuel-Thomas	Attendance: 12,757

31 March 2012 40	Leeds United	0–2	Watford	Elland Road
15:00			5', 89' Iwelumo	Attendance: 21,766

6 April 2012 41	Watford	0–2	Blackpool	Vicarage Road
15:00			25', 70' (pen.) Dobbie	Attendance: 16,314

9 April 2012 42	Cardiff City	1–1	Watford	Cardiff City Stadium
15:00	Miller 45+1'		82' Nosworthy	Attendance: 21,259

14 April 2012 43	Watford	1–1	Hull City	Vicarage Road
15:00	Deeney 12'		4' Chester	Attendance: 11,596

17 April 2012 44	Brighton & Hove Albion	2–2	Watford	Falmer Stadium
19:45	Calderón 55'; Buckley 79'		6' Murray; 44' (pen.) Deeney	Attendance: 19,189

21 April 2012 45	Peterborough United	2–2	Watford	London Road Stadium
15:00	Tomlin 14' (pen.); Taylor 54'		26' Deeney; 48' Murray	Attendance: 8,725

28 April 2012 46	Watford	2–1	Middlesbrough	Vicarage Road
12:30	Iwelumo 69'; Deeney 88'		85' Emnes	Attendance: 14,022

== League table ==
Pos	Team	Pld	W	D	L	GF	GA	GD	Pts
9	Leicester City	46	18	12	16	66	55	+11	66
10	Brighton & Hove Albion	46	17	15	14	52	52	0	66
11	Watford	46	16	16	14	56	64	−8	64
12	Derby County	46	18	10	18	50	58	−8	64
13	Burnley	46	17	11	18	61	58	+3	62

Updated to match(es) played on 28 April 2012. Source: BBC Sport
Rules for classification: 1) points; 2) goal difference; 3) number of goals scored.

== Round by round summary ==
Round	1	2	3	4	5	6	7	8	9	10	11	12	13	14	15	16	17	18	19	20	21	22	23	24	25	26	27	28	29	30	31	32	33	34	35	36	37	38	39	40	41	42	43	44	45	46
Ground	A	H	H	A	H	A	A	H	H	A	H	A	A	H	H	A	H	A	H	A	H	A	H	H	A	H	A	A	H	A	H	A	H	H	A	A	H	A	H	A	H	A	H	A	A	H
Result	D	L	L	D	D	W	D	L	W	L	L	L	L	W	W	L	W	D	D	W	D	D	D	W	L	L	L	W	W	D	W	L	L	W	D	W	D	W	W	W	L	D	D	D	D	W
Points	1	1	1	2	3	6	7	7	10	10	10	10	10	13	16	16	19	20	21	24	25	26	27	30	30	30	30	33	36	37	40	40	40	43	44	47	48	51	54	57	57	58	59	60	61	64
Position (Note: Positions refer to Watford's league placing at the end of the day on which they played the match.)	13	17	21	22	22	16	17	19	15	17	20	21	22	21	21	21	19	19	18	17	18	18	18	17	18	18	18	18	16	16	15	17	17	17	16	14	16	14	13	11	11	13	14	13	14	11

A = Away; H = Home; W = Win; D = Draw; L = Loss; = Relegation position

== FA Cup ==
7 January 2012 R3	Watford	4–2	Bradford City	Vicarage Road
15:00	Deeney 3'; Sordell 40'; Forsyth 56', 59'		8' Hanson; 88' Wells	Attendance: 8,935

27 January 2012 R4	Watford	0–1	Tottenham Hotspur	Vicarage Road
19:45			42' van der Vaart	Attendance: 15,384

== Football League Cup ==
10 August 2011	Bristol Rovers	P–P	Watford	Memorial Stadium

23 August 2011 R1	Bristol Rovers	1–1 (a.e.t.) (4–2 p)	Watford	Memorial Stadium
19:45	Harrold 5'		Sordell 2'	Attendance: 4,432
	Penalties
	Kuffour (penalty scored); McGleish (penalty missed); Virgo (penalty scored); Brown (penalty scored); Carayol (penalty scored)		Eustace (penalty missed); Sordell (penalty scored); Mariappa (penalty scored); Dickinson (penalty missed)

== Players ==
=== Statistics ===
No. = Squad number

Pos = Playing position

P = Number of games played

G = Number of goals scored

= Yellow cards

GK = Goalkeeper

DF = Defender

MF = Midfielder

FW = Forward

= Red cards

Yth = Whether player went through Watford's youth system

Joined club = Year that player became a Watford first team player (Note: For players who came through the club's youth system the date used refers to when they signed a professional contract, unless they appeared in a first-team match-day squad prior to that, in which case that date is used.)

Left club during 2011–12

Age = Age of player on final day of season (28 April 2012)

Correct as of 28 April 2012.

2011–12 Watford player details (Note: All professional players are listed apart from any who are still scholars and haven't featured in a 2011–12 first-team squad and Tom Aldred and Eddie Oshodi (who had originally been awarded the squad number 25), both of whom left before the end of the summer transfer window without making an appearance in a 2011–12 matchday squad.)
No.	Pos	Name	P	G	P	G	P	G	P	G	Yellow cards	Red cards	Age	Joined club	Yth	Notes
No.	Pos	Name	Championship		FA Cup		League Cup		Total		Discipline		Age	Joined club	Yth	Notes
1	GK	Scott Loach	31	0	1	0	0	0	32	0	0	1	23 years, 337 days	2006	No	—
2	DF	Lee Hodson	20	0	1	0	0	0	21	0	1	0	20 years, 209 days	2009	Yes	—
3	DF	Carl Dickinson	39	2	1	0	1	0	41	2	9	0	25 years, 28 days	2011	No	—
4	MF	John Eustace	39	4	2	0	1	0	42	4	5	0	32 years, 177 days	2008	No	—
5	DF	Martin Taylor	22	1	0	0	0	0	22	1	0	0	32 years, 171 days	2010	No	—
6	DF	Adrian Mariappa	39	1	2	0	1	0	42	1	7	1	25 years, 208 days	2005	Yes	—
7	MF	Mark Yeates	33	3	2	0	1	0	36	3	1	0	27 years, 108 days	2011	No	—
8	MF	Josh Walker	1	0	0	0	1	0	2	0	0	0	23 years, 67 days	2010	No	—
9	FW	Troy Deeney	43	11	2	1	1	0	46	12	7	0	23 years, 304 days	2010	No	—
10	FW	Chris Iwelumo	39	4	1	0	0	0	40	4	2	0	33 years, 271 days	2011	No	—
11	MF	Craig Forsyth	20	3	1	2	1	0	22	5	5	0	23 years, 64 days	2011	No	—
12	DF	Lloyd Doyley	33	0	2	0	1	0	36	0	4	1 (Note: Doyley's sending off in the home fixture against Leicester City was subsequently rescinded.)	29 years, 149 days	2001	Yes	—
13	GK	Rene Gilmartin	2	0	0	0	1	0	3	0	0	0	24 years, 333 days	2010	No	—
14	MF	Ross Jenkins	9	0	0	0	0	0	9	0	2	0	21 years, 171 days	2008	Yes	—
15	MF	Stephen McGinn	0	0	0	0	0	0	0	0	0	0	23 years, 148 days	2010	No	—
16	MF	Michael Bryan	0	0	0	0	0	0	0	0	0	0	22 years, 67 days	2009	Yes	—
17	DF	Dale Bennett	2	0	0	0	0	0	2	0	0	0	22 years, 113 days	2008	Yes	—
18	FW	Alexander Kacaniklic	12	1	0	0	0	0	12	1	1	0	20 years, 290 days	2012	No	Loan player
18	FW	Michael Kightly	12	3	0	0	0	0	12	3	1	0	26 years, 95 days	2011	No	Loan player
18	FW	Andreas Weimann	3	0	0	0	0	0	3	0	0	0	20 years, 267 days	2011	No	Loan player
19	MF	Prince Buaben	29	1	1	0	1	0	31	1	2	0	24 years, 5 days	2011	No	—
20	FW	Marvin Sordell	26	8	2	1	1	1	29	10	3	0	21 years, 71 days	2009	Yes	—
20	FW	Marcello Trotta	1	0	0	0	0	0	1	0	0	0	19 years, 212 days	2012	No	Loan player
21	DF	David Mirfin	4	0	0	0	1	0	5	0	0	0	27 years, 10 days	2011	No	—
22	MF	Sean Murray	18	7	1	0	0	0	19	7	1	0	18 years, 200 days	2010	Yes	—
23	MF	Piero Mingoia	0	0	0	0	0	0	0	0	0	0	20 years, 191 days	2010	Yes	—
24	FW	Matthew Whichelow	2	0	1	0	0	0	3	0	0	0	20 years, 213 days	2010	Yes	—
25	FW	Joe Garner	22	1	2	0	0	0	24	1	2	0	24 years, 16 days	2011	No	—
26	MF	Britt Assombalonga	4	0	0	0	0	0	4	0	1	0	19 years, 144 days	2011	Yes	—
27	FW	Gavin Massey	3	0	0	0	1	0	4	0	0	0	19 years, 207 days	2010	Yes	—
28	MF	Chez Isaac	0	0	0	0	0	0	0	0	0	0	19 years, 164 days	2011	Yes	—
29	DF	Adam Thompson	0	0	0	0	0	0	0	0	0	0	19 years, 213 days	2010	Yes	—
30	GK	Jonathan Bond	1	0	1	0	0	0	2	0	0	0	18 years, 345 days	2010	Yes	—
31	DF	Tom James	0	0	1	0	0	0	1	0	0	0	23 years, 161 days	2011	No	—
32	MF	Jonathan Hogg	40	0	1	0	0	0	41	0	9	0	23 years, 144 days	2011	No	—
33	DF	Nyron Nosworthy	32	2	2	0	0	0	34	2	7	0	31 years, 200 days	2011	No	Initially on loan; signed permanently
34	GK	Jack Bonham	0	0	0	0	0	0	0	0	0	0	18 years, 227 days	2010	Yes	—
35	GK	Tomasz Kuszczak	13	0	0	0	0	0	13	0	0	0	30 years, 39 days	2012	No	Loan player
37	FW	Craig Beattie	4	1	0	0	0	0	4	1	0	0	28 years, 103 days	2011	No	Loan player

=== Transfers ===
Unless a country is specified, all clubs play in the English football league system.

==== In ====
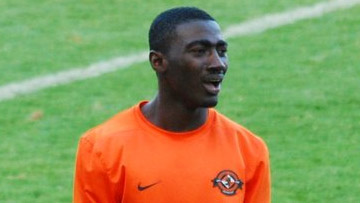
Ghana international Prince Buaben joined Watford from Dundee United

Date	Player	From	Fee
21 June 2011	Craig Forsyth	Dundee	Undisclosed
4 July 2011	David Mirfin	Scunthorpe United	Free (end of contract)
13 July 2011	Mark Yeates	Sheffield United	Undisclosed
14 July 2011	Prince Buaben	Dundee United	Free (end of contract)
19 July 2011	Chris Iwelumo	Burnley	Undisclosed
29 July 2011	Carl Dickinson	Stoke City	Undisclosed
4 August 2011	Tom James	Stratford Town	Free
27 August 2011	Jonathan Hogg	Aston Villa	Undisclosed
31 August 2011	Joe Garner	Nottingham Forest	Undisclosed
10 January 2012	Nyron Nosworthy	Sunderland	Undisclosed

==== Out ====
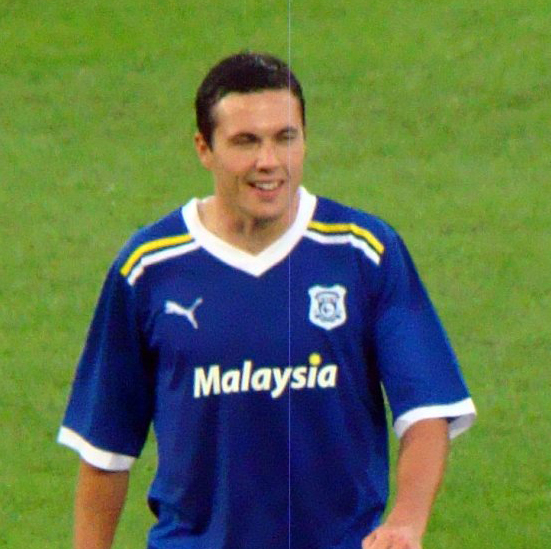
Don Cowie joined Cardiff City on a free transfer

Date (Note: For players whose contract expired, the date given refers to when they signed for their new club, apart from Rob Kiernan whose signature date for Wigan Athletic is unknown. Therefore, his date refers to when he left Watford.)	Player	To	Fee
26 May 2011	Liam Henderson	York City	Free (end of contract, released)
6 June 2011	Will Buckley	Brighton & Hove Albion	£1m
7 June 2011	Danny Graham	Swansea City	£3.5m
21 June 2011	Nathan Ellington	Ipswich Town	Free (end of contract, released)
27 June 2011	Mat Sadler	Walsall	Free (end of contract, released)
28 June 2011	Rob Kiernan	Wigan Athletic	Free (end of contract, rejected renewal)
1 July 2011	Don Cowie	Cardiff City	Free (end of contract, rejected renewal)
31 August 2011	Tom Aldred	Colchester United	Free (contract terminated)
31 August 2011	Eddie Oshodi	Forest Green Rovers (Note: Oshodi did not join Forest Green until 7 October 2011.)	Free (contract terminated)
31 January 2012	Marvin Sordell	Bolton Wanderers	Undisclosed

=== Loans ===
- ‡ Loan end date was end of season
- † Watford academy scholar

==== In ====
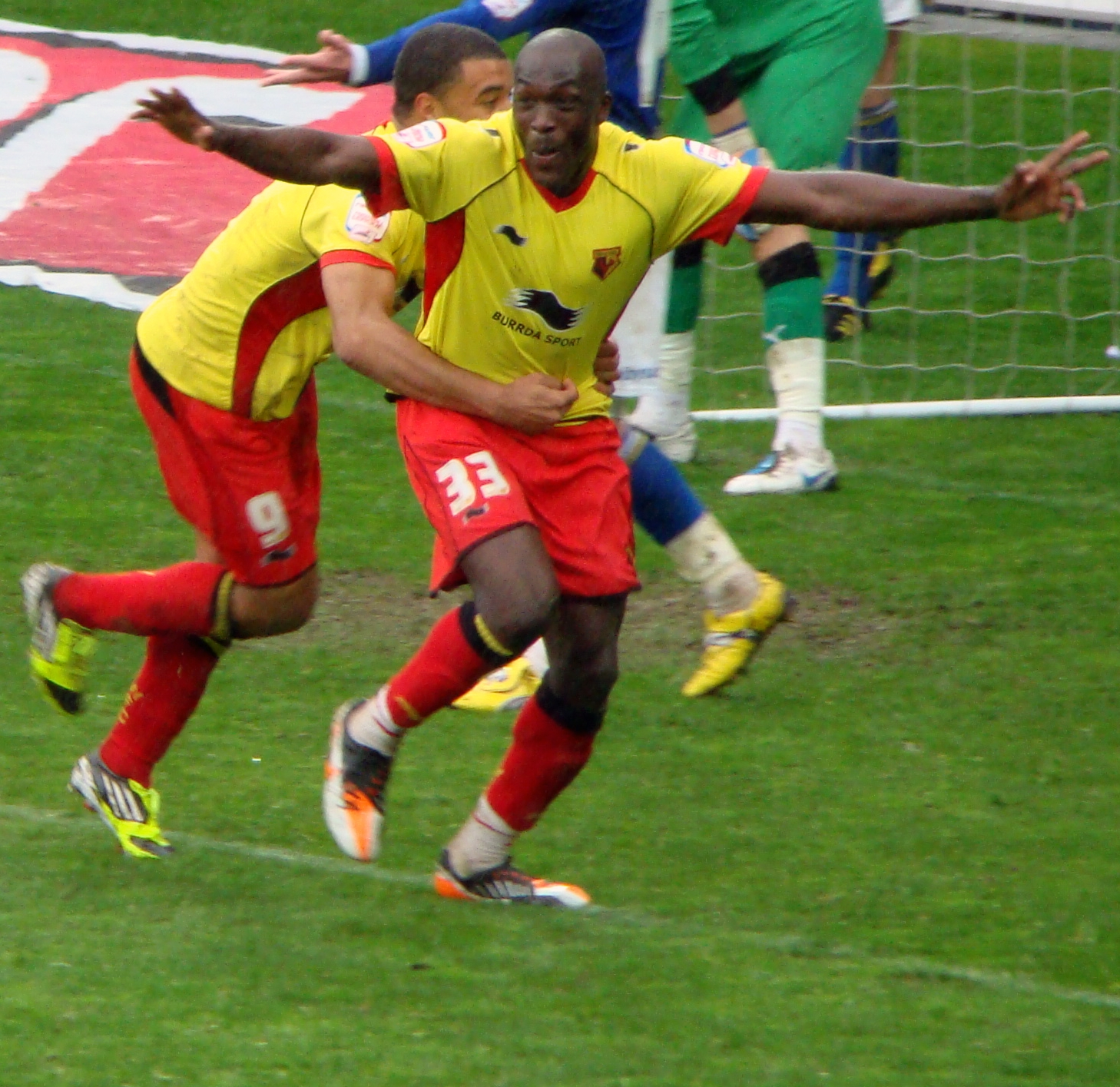
Nyron Nosworthy transferred to Watford after an initial loan period.

Start	Player	From	End
26 August 2011	Andreas Weimann	Aston Villa	23 September 2011 (Note: Weimann joined Watford on a loan until early January on 26 August 2011, but the loan was terminated early by Aston Villa.)
11 October 2011	Michael Kightly	Wolverhampton Wanderers	3 January 2012 (Note: Kightly joined Watford on a loan until after Watford's fixture against Portsmouth on 19 November. However the loan was extended until 3 January.)
24 October 2011	Craig Beattie	Swansea City	8 January 2012
28 October 2011	Nyron Nosworthy	Sunderland	8 January 2012
30 January 2012	Alexander Kacaniklic	Fulham	End of the season (Note: Kacaniklic's loan was meant to last until the end of the season, but he was recalled by Fulham on 27 March.)
21 February 2012	Tomasz Kuszczak	Manchester United	28 April 2012 ‡
23 February 2012	Marcello Trotta	Fulham	24 March 2012

==== Out ====
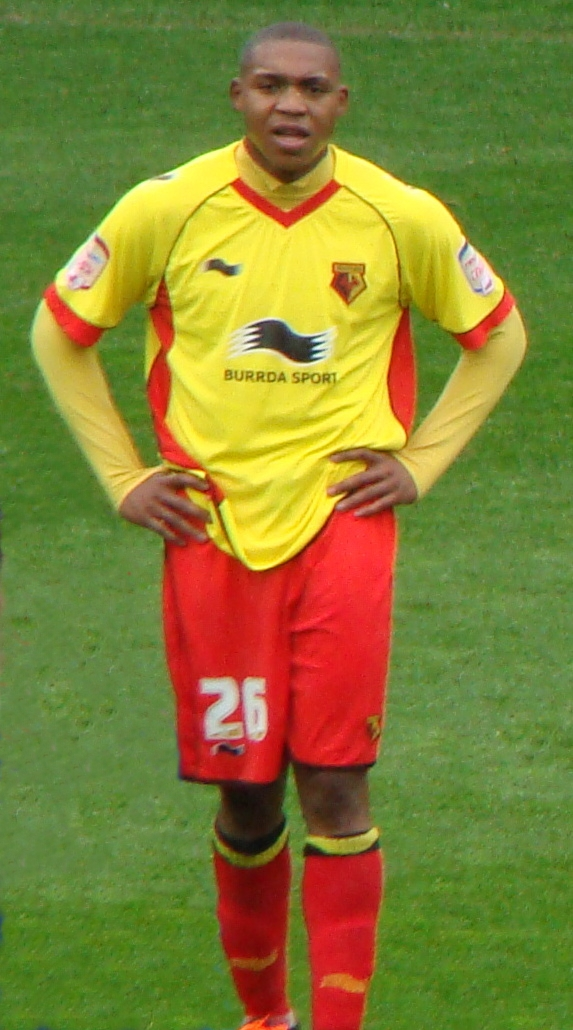
Britt Assombalonga became the 50th academy player to make his Watford debut in 2012, following two loan periods.

Start	Player	To	Level	End
21 June 2011	Tom Aldred	Inverness Caledonian Thistle	Scottish Premier League	25 August 2011 (Note: Aldred joined Inverness on a six-month loan on 21 June 2011, but it was terminated early.)
11 August 2011	Michael Bryan	Bradford City	League Two	3 January 2012
13 August 2011	Jonathan Bond	Brackley Town	Southern League Premier Division	13 October 2011 (Note: Bond's loan originally lasted until 13 September, but was extended to 11 October.)
25 August 2011	Adam Thompson	Brentford	League One	25 October 2011 (Note: Thompson's loan originally lasted until 25 September, but was extended to 25 October.)
30 August 2011	Josh Walker	Stevenage	League One	17 November 2011 (Note: Walker joined Stevenage on a loan until mid-January. However, while his loan did not officially expire until then, Watford recalled him on 17 November so he could play development football prior to becoming available for the first team.)
12 September 2011	Gavin Massey	Yeovil Town	League One	14 January 2012 (Note: Massey's loan originally lasted until 12 October, but was extended three times, first to 6 November, then to 11 December and then to 14 January. The loan was extended for a further month on 4 January, but was then cancelled on 12 January.)
15 September 2011	Chez Isaac	Boreham Wood	Conference South	16 December 2011 (Note: Isaac's loan was initially announced to last until 15 October, however on 10 November the loan was extended until 16 December.)
15 September 2011	Matthew Whichelow	Exeter City	League One	11 October 2011
27 October 2011	Dale Bennett	Brentford	League One	27 November 2011
4 November 2011	Jonathan Bond	Forest Green Rovers	Conference	1 December 2011 (Note: Bond's loan originally lasted until 4 December, but he was recalled a few days early.)
23 November 2011	Rene Gilmartin	Yeovil Town	League One	19 January 2012 (Note: Gilmartin's loan initially lasted until 3 January, but on 1 January it was extended until 3 February. However, the loan was terminated on 19 January.)
25 November 2011	Britt Assombalonga	Wealdstone	Isthmian League Premier Division	3 February 2012 (Note: Assombalonga and Smith were originally due to remain at Wealdstone until 3 January, but on 4 January it was announced that the loan had been extended for a further month.)
25 November 2011	Connor Smith †	Wealdstone	Isthmian League Premier Division	2 May 2012 ‡
1 January 2012	Dale Bennett	Brentford	League One	1 February 2012
1 January 2012	Chez Isaac	Tamworth	Conference	28 March 2012 (Note: Isaac's loan was initially announced to last until 1 February, but it was extended twice, first to 1 March, then to 28 March.)
5 January 2012	Piero Mingoia	Brentford	League One	23 January 2012 (Note: Mingoia's loan was set to last until 5 February, but he returned to Watford on 23 January.)
13 January 2012	Josh Walker	Scunthorpe United	League One	14 April 2012 (Note: Walker had been set to sign for Scunthorpe on a free transfer, but he was unable due to FIFA regulations, so signed on on an initial one-month loan. He continued to play for Scunthorpe after that month, and it was announced on 20 March that loan had been extended to 13 April. However, Walker played the final match of his loan spell on 14 April.)
19 January 2012	Gavin Massey	Colchester United	League One	16 February 2012 (Note: Massey's loan was set to last until 19 February, but he was recalled a few days early.)
31 January 2012	David Mirfin	Scunthorpe United	League One	5 May 2012 ‡
31 January 2012	Matthew Whichelow	Wycombe Wanderers	League One	28 February 2012
2 February 2012	Tommie Hoban †	Wealdstone	Isthmian League Premier Division	2 May 2012 ‡ (Note: Thompson's loan initially lasted until 2 March, but on 6 March it was announced the loan had been extended until 10 April.)
9 February 2012	Adam Thompson	Brentford	League One	5 May 2012 ‡ (Note: Thompson's loan initially lasted until 7 March, but was extended twice, first until 10 April, then until 5 May.)
10 February 2012	Britt Assombalonga	Braintree Town	Conference	10 March 2012
16 February 2012	Rene Gilmartin	Crawley Town	League Two	18 March 2012
17 February 2012	Jack Bonham †	Harrow Borough	Isthmian League Premier Division	1 April 2012 (Note: Bonham's loan initially lasted until 12 March, but on 14 March it was announced the loan had been extended until 14 April. However, Bonham was forced to return early after he broke a bone in his hand.)
17 February 2012	Stephan Hamilton-Forbes †	Harrow Borough	Isthmian League Premier Division	14 March 2012 (Note: Hamilton-Forbes was loaned "until further notice", and it was announced he had returned on 14 March.)
17 February 2012	Aaron Tumwa †	Harrow Borough	Isthmian League Premier Division	28 April 2012 ‡
23 February 2012	Jonathan Bond	Dagenham & Redbridge	League Two	22 March 2012 (Note: Bond's loan was supposed to last until 25 March, but he was recalled a few days early on 22 March and joined Bury on loan the same day.)
17 March 2012	Gavin Massey	Colchester United	League One	14 April 2012
22 March 2012	Jonathan Bond	Bury	League One	5 May 2012 ‡
22 March 2012	Piero Mingoia	Hayes & Yeading	Conference	28 April 2012 ‡ (Note: Mingoia's loan was announced to last until 25 April, but he played in Hayes & Yeading's final match of the season on 28 April.)

== Reserves and academy ==
Watford's reserve side played friendlies in 2011–12, following their withdrawal from the Totesport.com Combination East Division. The under-18s played their home games at Watford's training base at the UCL training ground, London Colney. They are members of the FA Premier Academy League. They went out of the FA Youth Cup in the fourth round away at Newcastle United, losing 2–1, having beaten Millwall 2–1 away in the third round. They also played in the Herts Senior Cup, going out to Bishop's Stortford in the first round. The side were coached by technical skills coach Adam Pilling from the end of August until the first week of October, when David Hughes, who had been appointed on 22 September, took up his position as youth team coach.

Watford's academy consists of 20 scholars:

- In the second year, goalkeeper Jack Bonham, defenders Chimdi Akubuine, Matt Bevans, Tommie Hoban, Brandon Horner and Aaron Tumwa, midfielders Stephan Hamilton Forbes, and Sean Murray, and strikers Dereece Gardner, Michael Kalu and Connor Smith.
- In the first year, defenders Kyle Connolly, David O'Connor and Jordan Wilmore, midfielders Austin Eaton, Kamaron English, Luke O'Nien, Jack Westlake, and strikers Bernard Mensah and Morgan Ferrier.

Murray signed a professional contract during the 2010 pre-season, alongside his scholarship forms. Bonham and Hoban signed a professional deals in September 2010 and May 2011 respectively. In July 2011 Mensah signed a contract that saw him turn professional on his 17th birthday. Ferrier joined Watford on 20 September after a trial period, having previously been in Arsenal's youth system. Connolly joined on 1 December at second year scholar age, following a trial period. In April Watford announced the fates of the remaining second-year scholars; Hamilton Forbes, Smith and Tumwa were given professional contracts, Akubine, Horner, Kalu and Gardner were released, while Bevans had his scholarship extended due an injury which kept him sidelined from October.

Hoban and Murray both made first-team appearances during 2010–11, while Smith was an unused substitute. Murray has played for the first-team in 2011–12, while Bonham has been an unused substitute. Bonham, Hamilton-Forbes, Hoban, Smith and Tumwa have all been loaned to non-league sides in 2011–12.
