= Forrayah Bass =

English footballer

Personal information
- Full name: Forrayah George Warrington Nathaniel Bass
- Date of birth: 12 March 1995 (age 31)
- Height: 5 ft 11 in (1.80 m)
- Position: Forward

Youth career
- Leeds United
- Bradford City

College career
Years	Team	Apps	(Gls)
2013	Louisburg Hurricanes	10	(5)
2014	San Diego State Aztecs		

Senior career*
Years	Team	Apps	(Gls)
2012–2013	Bradford City	0	(0)
- * Club domestic league appearances and goals as of 09:08, 25 December 2014 (UTC)

Forrayah George Warrington Nathaniel Bass (born 12 March 1995) is an English footballer who plays as a forward.

He formerly played for Bradford City, as a left back and midfielder.

== Career ==
After playing youth football for both Leeds United and Bradford City, Bass made his senior debut for Bradford City on 18 December 2012 in the FA Cup, where he was substituted for fellow debutant Nathan Curtis during extra time.

He later played college soccer for Louisburg College and San Diego State.

== Career statistics ==
As of 18 December 2012

Appearances and goals by club, season and competition
Club	Season	League		FA Cup		League Cup		Other		Total	
Club	Season	Apps	Goals	Apps	Goals	Apps	Goals	Apps	Goals	Apps	Goals
Bradford City	2012–13	0	0	1	0	0	0	0	0	1	0
Career total		0	0	1	0	0	0	0	0	1	0
