= Mo Shariff =

English footballer (born 1993)

Personal information
- Full name: Abdalla Mohamed Shariff
- Date of birth: 8 March 1993 (age 33)
- Place of birth: Newham, England
- Height: 1.77 m (5 ft 9 1/2 in)
- Position: Forward

Youth career
- –2009: Slough Town

Senior career*
Years	Team	Apps	(Gls)
2009–2010	Slough Town	15	(4)
2010–2014	Queens Park Rangers	0	(0)
2011	→ St Albans City (loan)	3	(1)
2011–2012	→ Staines Town (loan)	0	(0)
2012	→ Woking (loan)	3	(0)
2013	→ Dagenham & Redbridge (loan)	4	(0)
2014–2015	Bradford City	1	(0)
2014–2015	→ Hemel Hempstead Town (loan)	8	(0)
2015	Hemel Hempstead Town	9	(1)
2015	Kings Langley (dual-reg)	2	(0)
- * Club domestic league appearances and goals as of 18:34, 25 July 2016 (UTC)

Abdalla Mohamed "Mo" Shariff (born 8 March 1993) is a professional footballer who most recently played for Bradford City as a forward.

== Career ==
Shariff started his career in the youth setup at Slough Town, progressing to the first team in the summer of 2009. He played a full season in the Southern League, making 24 appearances in all competitions, scoring 5 goals. In August 2010, he joined Football League Championship side Queens Park Rangers on a free transfer with a one-year contract, after impressing on trial during the summer. In February 2011, he signed a two-year contract extension until the summer of 2013. In November 2011, he joined Southern Premier Division side St Albans City on loan. In December 2011, he joined Conference South side Staines Town on loan but failed to play any games due to injury. On 26 January 2012, he joined Conference South side Woking on a one-month loan deal. On 28 March 2013, he joined Football League Two side Dagenham & Redbridge on loan until the end of the season. On 29 March 2013, he made his professional debut in a 0–0 league draw with Barnet, replacing Toni Silva as a substitute. On 17 August 2013, Sharif featured on the bench for Queens Park Rangers in their 1–0 win over Ipswich Town

== Career statistics ==
As of match played 12 December 2015.

Appearances and goals by club, season and competition
Club	Season	League			FA Cup		League Cup		Other		Total	
Club	Season	Division	Apps	Goals	Apps	Goals	Apps	Goals	Apps	Goals	Apps	Goals
Slough Town	2009–10	SL Division One Midlands	15	4	2	0	—		5 (Note: Three appearances and one goal in FA Trophy, two in Southern League Division One Midlands play-offs)	1	22	5
St Albans City (loan)	2011–12	SL Premier Division	3	1	—		—		—		3	1
Woking (loan)	2011–12	Conference South	3	0	—		—		—		3	0
Dagenham & Redbridge (loan)	2012–13	League Two	4	0	—		—		—		4	0
Queens Park Rangers	2013–14	Championship	0	0	0	0	1	0	0	0	1	0
Bradford City	2014–15	League One	1	0	0	0	1	0	0	0	2	0
Hemel Hempstead Town (loan)	2014–15	Conference South	8	0	—		—		2 (Note: Appearances in FA Trophy)	0	10	0
Hemel Hempstead Town	2015–16	National League South	9	1	1	0	—		1	0	11	1
Hemel Hempstead Town	Total		17	1	1	0	—		3	0	21	1
Kings Langley	2015–16	SL Division One Central	2	0	—		—		—		2	0
Career total			45	6	3	0	2	0	8	1	58	7
