= Mark Yeates =

Irish footballer (born 1985)

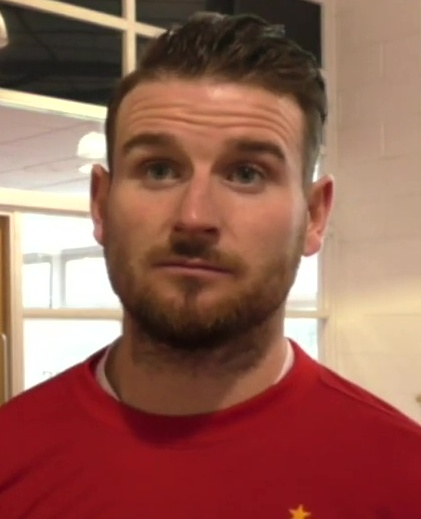
- Yeates in 2014

Personal information
- Full name: Mark Stephen Anthony Yeates
- Date of birth: 11 January 1985 (age 41)
- Place of birth: Tallaght, Ireland
- Position: Winger

Senior career*
Years	Team	Apps	(Gls)
2002–2007	Tottenham Hotspur	3	(0)
2003–2004	→ Brighton & Hove Albion (loan)	9	(0)
2004	→ Swindon Town (loan)	4	(0)
2005–2006	→ Colchester United (loan)	44	(5)
2006–2007	→ Hull City (loan)	5	(0)
2007	→ Leicester City (loan)	9	(1)
2007–2009	Colchester United	72	(20)
2009–2010	Middlesbrough	19	(1)
2010–2011	Sheffield United	55	(7)
2011–2013	Watford	62	(7)
2013–2015	Bradford City	70	(5)
2015–2016	Oldham Athletic	16	(1)
2016–2017	Blackpool	16	(0)
2017	Notts County	14	(0)
2017–2019	Eastleigh	89	(9)
2019–2020	AFC Fylde	29	(1)
2020–2022	Bamber Bridge	40	(4)
Total		556	(61)

International career
	Republic of Ireland U21	3	(0)
2007	Republic of Ireland B	1	(0)
- * Club domestic league appearances and goals

Mark Stephen Anthony Yeates (born 11 January 1985) is an Irish professional football coach and former player who played as a winger.

Yeates began his career with Tottenham Hotspur but failed to make the transition to the first team, spending time on loan at Brighton & Hove Albion, Swindon Town, Colchester United, Hull City and Leicester City. On leaving Spurs he returned on a permanent deal to Colchester before spells with Middlesbrough, Sheffield United, Watford, Bradford City, Oldham Athletic, Blackpool and Notts County. He has three under-21 caps for the Republic of Ireland.

== Playing career ==
=== Early career ===
Yeates played schoolboy football with Greenhills Boys and Cherry Orchard in Dublin. He started his senior career at Tottenham Hotspur, but first played professional football in loan spells with Brighton & Hove Albion and Swindon Town during the 2003–04 season. Loaned to Swindon as part of the transfer to Spurs of Swindon player Leigh Mills, Yeates only played four games before being returned to White Hart Lane after a disagreement with then manager Andy King. He made his Spurs debut against Wolves on the final day of the 2003–04 Premier League season, setting up a goal for Robbie Keane. He made three first team appearances for Spurs.

During the 2005–06 season, Yeates played on long-term loan at Colchester United, scoring five league goals, as they achieved promotion from League One. He also nearly scored but hit the post in that seasons FA cup run against Chelsea.

Prior to 2006–07 Yeates signed a two-year contract extension with Spurs. He joined Championship team Hull City on a season-long loan, but hardly featured for them before returning to his parent club midway through the season.

He then signed a loan contract until the end of the 2006–07 season with another Championship side, Leicester City. He scored on his Leicester début at the Walkers Stadium in a 1–1 draw with Luton Town. On 25 April 2007, having only featured 16 times for Leicester, and not once under caretaker manager Nigel Worthington, he was allowed to return to Spurs after being deemed surplus to requirements.

=== Colchester United ===
On 3 July 2007 he completed a permanent move to Colchester United. Yeates was set to sign for Crystal Palace Football Club, but due to the fact that he failed his medical, the transfer was abandoned. He had a productive year in League One, during which time, he scored the first competitive goal at the new Colchester Community Stadium in a game against Oldham.

=== Middlesbrough ===
Yeates then signed for newly relegated Championship team Middlesbrough for £500,000 on 26 June 2009. He made his début for Middlesbrough on 7 August 2009 in a 0–0 draw with Sheffield United. In and out of the team in the first part of the season, he scored what turned out to be his only goal for Middlesbrough in their 5–1 win over QPR in December 2009.

=== Sheffield United ===
After finding himself surplus to requirements under new boss Gordon Strachan, Yeates signed for Boro's Championship rivals Sheffield United. He scored his first goal for Sheffield United in a 2–1 defeat at Preston North End on 9 February 2010. Having made the move, Yeates found himself playing no more regularly at Bramall Lane than at Middlesbrough. In an eighteen-month stay, he was in and out of the side and never showed any real consistency. By the time Micky Adams took over as manager of the Blades, Yeates was virtually frozen out of the first team altogether.

=== Watford ===
In July 2011, Yeates signed for Watford on a two-year deal for an undisclosed fee. He scored on his debut against Burnley to put Watford 2–0 up, with the game finishing 2–2. Yeates was a regular in the Watford side up until their FA Cup clash against Tottenham Hotspur on 27 January, in which he lost his place to Sean Murray. However, he continued to make substitute appearances and retained his place in the squad the following season under then-new manager, Gianfranco Zola. During this period, Yeates was primarily played in a central role rather than his usual wide position, with Yeates stating that he actually preferred this new position

On 7 June 2013, Watford announced that Yeates' contract would not be renewed and he was to be released as a free agent.

=== Bradford City ===
On 3 July 2013, Yeates signed a two-year contract with Bradford City, the third time that Yeates had worked under manager Phil Parkinson, having previously played under him at Hull City and Colchester United. Yeates made his Bradford debut on 3 August, the opening day of the season, playing 66 minutes of a 2–2 draw against Bristol City. and scored his first goal for the club during his second appearance, in a 4–0 win against Carlisle United. On 26 November, Yeates came off the bench to score his second goal for the club in a 1–1 draw against Notts County.

=== Oldham Athletic ===
On 25 August 2015, Yeates joined Oldham Athletic on a short-term deal. Yeates scored one goal in 20 games for the club.

=== Blackpool ===
On 7 January 2016, Yeates joined Blackpool on an initial 18-month deal from Oldham Athletic with the option for a further year.

=== Notts County ===
On 30 January 2017, Yeates signed for Notts County.

=== Eastleigh ===
On 28 June 2017, Yeates joined National League side Eastleigh on a two-year deal.

=== AFC Fylde ===
Yeates left Eastleigh to join AFC Fylde on 12 June 2019.

=== Bamber Bridge ===
Yeates joined Bamber Bridge from AFC Fylde in September 2020.

== Coaching career ==
Yeates joined the academy coaching staff at Fleetwood Town, working with the under-13s. He was appointed to a full-time role within the academy in September 2021. He became the under-18s assistant coach in July 2022, before becoming head coach of the under-18s in January 2023, guiding the team to the fifth round of the 2022–23 FA Youth Cup. On 29 September 2025, Yeates was announced as interim assistant manager of Fleetwood Town's sister club Waterford until the end of their League of Ireland Premier Division season in November, working under interim head coach Matt Lawlor following the sacking of John Coleman.

== Personal life ==
His late father Stephen played for Shelbourne, Shamock Rovers (two goals in 11 appearances in 1989–90), Athlone Town and Kilkenny City.

== Career statistics ==
Appearances and goals by club, season and competition
Club	Season	League			FA Cup		League Cup		Other		Total	
Club	Season	Division	Apps	Goals	Apps	Goals	Apps	Goals	Apps	Goals	Apps	Goals
Tottenham Hotspur	2002–03	Premier League	0	0	0	0	0	0	—		0	0
Tottenham Hotspur	2003–04	Premier League	1	0	0	0	0	0	—		1	0
Tottenham Hotspur	2004–05	Premier League	2	0	1	0	0	0	—		3	0
Tottenham Hotspur	2005–06	Premier League	0	0	0	0	0	0	—		0	0
Tottenham Hotspur	2006–07	Premier League	0	0	0	0	0	0	0	0	0	0
Tottenham Hotspur	Total		3	0	1	0	0	0	0	0	4	0
Brighton & Hove Albion (loan)	2003–04	Second Division	9	0	0	0	0	0	1 (Note: Appearance(s) in Football League Trophy)	0	10	0
Swindon Town (loan)	2004–05	League One	4	0	0	0	0	0	0	0	4	0
Colchester United (loan)	2005–06	League One	44	5	5	1	1	0	2	0	52	6
Hull City (loan)	2006–07	Championship	5	0	0	0	2	0	—		7	0
Leicester City (loan)	2006–07	Championship	9	1	0	0	0	0	—		9	1
Colchester United	2007–08	Championship	29	8	1	0	1	0	—		31	8
Colchester United	2008–09	League One	43	12	1	0	2	0	4	1	50	13
Colchester United	Total		72	20	2	0	3	0	4	1	81	21
Middlesbrough	2009–10	Championship	19	1	1	0	1	0	—		21	1
Sheffield United	2009–10	Championship	20	2	0	0	0	0	—		20	2
Sheffield United	2010–11	Championship	35	5	0	0	1	0	—		36	5
Sheffield United	Total		55	7	0	0	1	0	—		56	7
Watford	2011–12	Championship	33	3	2	0	1	0	—		36	3
Watford	2012–13	Championship	29	4	0	0	1	0	0	0	30	4
Watford	Total		62	7	2	0	2	0	0	0	66	7
Bradford City	2013–14	League One	29	2	1	0	0	0	1	0	31	2
Bradford City	2014–15 (Note: Both Soccerbase and Soccerway list Yeates as an unused substitute in the League Cup fixture against MK Dons, whereas the English National Football Archive (ENFA) states he came on as a substitute. As the Soccerbase and Soccerway line-ups would mean Bradford City ended the game with two goalkeepers, ENFA is considered the more reliable source. This is confirmed by the Bradford Telegraph & Argus match report)	League One	41	3	7	2	2	0	1	0	51	5
Bradford City	Total		70	5	8	2	2	0	2	0	82	7
Oldham Athletic	2015–16	League One	16	1	3	0	0	0	1	0	20	1
Blackpool	2015–16	League One	11	0	0	0	0	0	0	0	11	0
Blackpool	2016–17	League Two	5	0	4	0	2	0	5 (Note: Appearances in EFL Trophy)	0	16	0
Blackpool	Total		16	0	4	0	2	0	5	0	27	0
Notts County	2016–17	League Two	14	0	0	0	0	0	0	0	14	0
Eastleigh	2017–18	National League	45	5	1	0	—		1 (Note: Appearance(s) in FA Trophy)	0	47	5
Eastleigh	2018–19	National League	44	4	1	0	—		3 (Note: One appearance in FA Trophy; two appearances in National League play-offs)	0	48	4
Eastleigh	Total		89	9	2	0	—		4	0	95	9
AFC Fylde	2019–20	National League	29	1	4	0	—		3	0	36	1
Bamber Bridge	2020–21	Northern Premier League Premier Division	7	0	—		—		1	0	8	0
Bamber Bridge	2021–22	Northern Premier League Premier Division	33	4	1	0	—		0	0	34	4
Bamber Bridge	Total		40	4	1	0	—		1	0	42	4
Career totals			556	61	33	3	14	0	23	1	626	65

== Honours ==
Colchester United

- Football League One runner-up: 2005–06
