= 2013–14 Queens Park Rangers F.C. season =

English football club season

Queens Park Rangers
2013–14 season
- Chairman: Tony Fernandes
- Manager: Harry Redknapp
- Stadium: Loftus Road (18,489)
- Football League Championship: 4th (promoted via play-offs)
- FA Cup: Third round
- League Cup: Second round
- Top goalscorer: League: Charlie Austin (19); All: Charlie Austin (20)
- Highest home attendance: 18,171 v Derby County (2 November 2013)
- Lowest home attendance: 14,649 v Wigan Athletic (25 March 2014)
- Average home league attendance: 16,655
- Biggest win: 5-2 Vs Nottingham Forest (12 April 2014)
- Biggest defeat: 0-4 Vs Everton (4 January 2014)
Home colours	Away colours	Third colours

The 2013–14 season was Queens Park Rangers's 125th professional season.

== Kit ==
Lotto Sport Italia continued as manufacturers of QPR's kit. Airline AirAsia continued as kit sponsor.

== Players ==
As of 19 February 2014

=== First team squad ===
No.	Name	Nationality	Position (s)	Since	Date of Birth (Age)	Signed from	Game(s)	Goal(s)
Goalkeepers
1	Robert Green	(England)	GK	2012	18 January 1980 (age 46)	(England) West Ham United	64	0
26	Brian Murphy	(Republic of Ireland)	GK	2011	7 May 1983 (age 42)	(England) Ipswich Town	2	0
Defenders
2	Danny Simpson	(England)	RB	2013	4 January 1987 (age 39)	(England) Newcastle United	36	0
3	Armand Traoré	(Senegal) (Note: Traoré was born in Chatenay-Malabry, France, and represented them at U-17, U-18, U-19, and U-21 level, but also qualifies to represent Senegal internationally and made his international debut for Senegal in August 2011.)	LB / LM	2011	8 October 1989 (age 36)	(England) Arsenal	73	2
5	Richard Dunne	(Republic of Ireland)	CB	2013	21 September 1979 (age 46)	(England) Aston Villa	44	1
6	Clint Hill	(England)	CB / LB	2010	19 October 1978 (age 47)	(England) Crystal Palace	140	4
13	Yun Suk-young	(South Korea)	LB	2013	13 February 1990 (age 36)	(South Korea) Chunnam Dragons	9	1
15	Nedum Onuoha	(England) (Note: Onuoha was born in Warri, Nigeria, but was raised in England and has represented them at U-20 and U-21 level.)	CB / RB	2012	12 November 1986 (age 39)	(England) Manchester City	68	2
18	Aaron Hughes	(Northern Ireland)	CB / RB	2014	8 November 1979 (age 46)	(England) Fulham	11	0
21	Luke Young	(England)	RB	2011	19 July 1979 (age 46)	(England) Aston Villa	24	2
28	Max Ehmer	(Germany)	CB / LB	2010	3 February 1992 (age 34)	(England) Queens Park Rangers Academy	1	0
37	Jamie Sendles-White	(Northern Ireland) (Note: Sendles-White was born in Kingston upon Thames, England, but also qualifies to represent Northern Ireland internationally and has represented them at U-19, U-20, and U-21 level.)	CB	2013	10 April 1994 (age 32)	(England) Queens Park Rangers Academy	0	0
38	Coll Donaldson	(Scotland)	CB	2013	9 April 1995 (age 31)	(Scotland) Livingston	1	0
39	Benoît Assou-Ekotto	(Cameroon) (Note: Assou-Ekotto was born in Arras, France, but also qualifies to represent Cameroon internationally and made his international debut for Cameroon in February 2009.)	LB	2013	24 March 1984 (age 42)	On loan from (England) Tottenham Hotspur	31	0
Midfielders
4	Ravel Morrison	(England)	AM	2014	2 February 1993 (age 33)	On loan from (England) West Ham United	17	6
7	Matt Phillips	(Scotland) (Note: Phillips was born in Aylesbury, England, and represented them at U-19 and U-21 level, but also qualifies to represent Scotland internationally through his grandparents and made his international debut for Scotland in May 2012.)	RW / LW	2013	25 October 1991 (age 34)	(England) Blackpool	21	3
10	Tom Carroll	(England)	CM	2013	28 May 1992 (age 33)	On loan from (England) Tottenham Hotspur	26	0
11	Shaun Wright-Phillips	(England)	RW / LW	2011	25 October 1981 (age 44)	(England) Manchester City	63	1
16	Jermaine Jenas	(England)	CM	2012	18 February 1983 (age 43)	(England) Tottenham Hotspur	38	4
17	Joey Barton	(England)	CM	2011	2 September 1982 (age 43)	(England) Newcastle United	68	6
19	Niko Kranjčar	(Croatia)	AM	2014	13 August 1984 (age 41)	On loan from (Ukraine) Dynamo Kyiv	32	2
20	Karl Henry	(England)	DM	2013	26 November 1982 (age 43)	(England) Wolverhampton Wanderers	17	1
22	Hogan Ephraim	(England)	RW / LW	2007	31 March 1988 (age 38)	(England) West Ham United	147	7
23	Junior Hoilett	(Canada)	RW / LW	2012	5 June 1990 (age 35)	(England) Blackburn Rovers	64	6
30	Frankie Sutherland	(Republic of Ireland) (Note: Sutherland was born in Hillingdon, England, but also qualifies to represent the Republic of Ireland internationally through his grandmother and represented them at U-17, U-19, and U-21 level.)	CM	2013	6 December 1993 (age 32)	(England) Queens Park Rangers Academy	0	0
32	Alejandro Faurlín	(Argentina)	CM	2009	9 August 1986 (age 39)	(Argentina) Instituto Atlético	119	5
35	Yossi Benayoun	(Israel)	AM	2014	5 May 1980 (age 45)	(England) Chelsea	16	3
36	Gary O'Neil	(England)	RM / DM	2013	18 May 1983 (age 42)	(England) West Ham United	32	1
Forwards
8	Andrew Johnson	(England)	ST	2012	10 February 1981 (age 45)	(England) Fulham	20	2
9	Charlie Austin	(England)	CF	2013	5 July 1989 (age 36)	(England) Burnley	34	19
12	Will Keane	(England)	ST	2014	11 January 1993 (age 33)	On loan from (England) Manchester United	10	0
14	Kevin Doyle	(Republic of Ireland)	CF	2014	18 September 1983 (age 42)	On loan from (England) Wolverhampton Wanderers	12	2
25	Bobby Zamora	(England)	CF	2012	16 January 1981 (age 45)	(England) Fulham	54	10
34	Mo Shariff	(England)	ST	2011	5 March 1993 (age 33)	(England) Slough Town	0	0
40	Modibo Maïga	(Mali)	ST	2014	3 September 1987 (age 38)	On loan from (England) West Ham United	8	1

=== Loaned out ===
No.	Name	Nationality	Position (s)	Date of Birth (Age)	On Loan To	Loan Expiration
–	Bruno Andrade	(Portugal)	AM	2 October 1993 (age 32)	(England) Stevenage	10 February 2014
24	Samba Diakité	(Mali) (Note: Diakité was born in Montfermeil, France, but also qualifies to represent Mali internationally and made his international debut for Mali in January 2012.)	DM / CM	24 January 1989 (age 37)	(England) Watford	31 May 2014
27	Michael Harriman	(Republic of Ireland) (Note: Harriman was born in Chichester, England, but also qualifies to represent the Republic of Ireland internationally and represented them at U-18, U-19, and U-21 level.)	RB	23 October 1992 (age 33)	(England) Gillingham	31 May 2014
29	Tom Hitchcock	(England)	ST	1 October 1992 (age 33)	(England) Rotherham United	31 May 2014
33	Júlio César	(Brazil)	GK	3 September 1979 (age 46)	(Canada) Toronto FC	31 May 2014
–	Loïc Rémy	(France)	CF	2 January 1987 (age 39)	(England) Newcastle United	31 May 2014
–	Park Ji-sung	(South Korea)	RM / AM	25 February 1981 (age 45)	(Netherlands) PSV	31 May 2014
–	Esteban Granero	(Spain)	CM	2 July 1987 (age 38)	(Spain) Real Sociedad	31 May 2014
–	Stéphane Mbia	(Cameroon)	DM / CB	20 May 1986 (age 39)	(Spain) Sevilla	31 May 2014
–	Michael Doughty	(Wales) (Note: Doughty was born in Westminster, England, but also qualifies to represent Wales internationally and has represented them at U-19 and U-21 level.)	LM	20 November 1992 (age 33)	(England) Stevenage	31 May 2014
–	Adel Taarabt	(Morocco) (Note: Taarabt was born in Fez, Morocco, but was raised in France and represented them at U-17 and U-19 level before making his international debut for Morocco in February 2009.)	AM / LW	24 May 1989 (age 36)	(Italy) Milan	31 May 2014

== Transfers ==
=== In ===
Date	No.	Pos.	Name	From	Fee	Source(s)
1 July 2013	2	DF	(England) Danny Simpson	(England) Newcastle United	Free	
15 July 2013	5	DF	(Republic of Ireland) Richard Dunne	(England) Aston Villa	Free	
23 July 2013	20	MF	(England) Karl Henry	(England) Wolverhampton Wanderers	Undisclosed	
1 August 2013	9	FW	(England) Charlie Austin	(England) Burnley	Undisclosed	
7 August 2013	36	MF	(England) Gary O'Neil	(England) West Ham United	Free	
23 August 2013	7	MF	(Scotland) Matt Phillips	(England) Blackpool	Undisclosed	
25 September 2013	18	ST	(Uruguay) Javier Chevantón	Unattached	Free	
23 October 2013	24	DF	(United States) Oguchi Onyewu	Unattached	Free	
10 December 2013	35	MF	(Israel) Yossi Benayoun	Unattached	Free	
28 January 2014	38	DF	(Scotland) Coll Donaldson	(Scotland) Livingston	Undisclosed	
31 January 2014	18	DF	(Northern Ireland) Aaron Hughes	(England) Fulham	Free	

=== Out ===
Date	No.	Pos.	Name	To	Details	Source(s)
28 June 2013	9	FW	(France) Djibril Cissé	(Russia) Kuban Krasnodar	Released (Mutual Consent)	
30 June 2013	37	FW	(England) Jay Bothroyd	(Thailand) Muangthong United	Released (Contract End)	
30 June 2013	21	DF	(Israel) Tal Ben Haim	(Belgium) Standard Liège	Released (Contract End)	
30 June 2013	39	FW	(England) DJ Campbell	(England) Blackburn Rovers	Released (Contract End)	
30 June 2013	24	GK	(Czech Republic) Radek Černý	(Czech Republic) Slavia Prague	Released (Contract End)	
30 June 2013	–	FW	(England) Rob Hulse	Retirement	Released (Contract End)	
5 July 2013	5	DF	(Republic of the Congo) Christopher Samba	(Russia) Anzhi Makhachkala	£12,000,000	
26 July 2013	12	FW	(Scotland) Jamie Mackie	(England) Nottingham Forest	£1,000,000	
28 July 2013	19	DF	(Portugal) José Bosingwa	(Turkey) Trabzonspor	Released (Mutual Consent)	
14 August 2013	–	DF	(England) Anton Ferdinand	(Turkey) Antalyaspor	Released (Mutual Consent)	
6 November 2013	4	MF	(England) Shaun Derry	(England) Notts County	Managerial	
24 December 2013	18	ST	(Uruguay) Javier Chevantón	(Uruguay) Liverpool de Montevideo	Released (Contract End)	
11 January 2014	24	DF	(United States) Oguchi Onyewu	(England) Sheffield Wednesday	Released (Contract End)	

=== Loans in ===
Start	No	Pos.	Name	From	Expiry	Source(s)
2 September 2013	39	DF	(Cameroon) Benoît Assou-Ekotto	(England) Tottenham Hotspur	31 May 2014	
2 September 2013	10	MF	(England) Tom Carroll	(England) Tottenham Hotspur	31 May 2014	
2 September 2013	19	MF	(Croatia) Niko Kranjčar	(Ukraine) Dynamo Kyiv	31 May 2014	
31 January 2014	38	ST	(Brazil) Dellatorre	(Brazil) Desportivo Brasil	31 May 2014	
31 January 2014	14	ST	(Republic of Ireland) Kevin Doyle	(England) Wolverhampton Wanderers	31 May 2014	
31 January 2014	12	ST	(England) Will Keane	(England) Manchester United	31 May 2014	
31 January 2014	40	ST	(Mali) Modibo Maïga	(England) West Ham United	31 May 2014	
21 February 2014	4	MF	(England) Ravel Morrison	(England) West Ham United	24 May 2014	

=== Loans out ===
Start	No.	Pos.	Name	To	Expiry	Source(s)
5 August 2013	–	DF	(Republic of Ireland) Michael Harriman	(England) Gillingham	31 May 2014	
5 August 2013	18	FW	(France) Loïc Rémy	(England) Newcastle United	31 May 2014	
7 August 2013	10	MF	(Morocco) Adel Taarabt	(England) Fulham	30 January 2014	
8 August 2013	7	MF	(South Korea) Park Ji-sung	(Netherlands) PSV	31 May 2014	
8 August 2013	4	MF	(England) Shaun Derry	(England) Millwall	6 Nov 2013	
15 August 2013	14	MF	(Spain) Esteban Granero	(Spain) Real Sociedad	31 May 2014	
16 August 2013	–	MF	(Wales) Michael Doughty	(England) Stevenage	31 May 2014	
26 August 2013	40	MF	(Cameroon) Stéphane Mbia	(Spain) Sevilla	31 May 2014	
4 October 2013	–	MF	(Portugal) Bruno Andrade	(England) Stevenage	10 Feb 2014	
21 October 2013	–	MF	(Republic of Ireland) Frankie Sutherland	(England) Leyton Orient	11 Nov 2013	
25 October 2013	13	DF	(South Korea) Yun Suk-young	(England) Doncaster Rovers	1 Jan 2014	
4 November 2013	28	DF	(Germany) Max Ehmer	(England) Carlisle United	27 Jan 2014	
8 November 2013	22	MF	(England) Hogan Ephraim	(England) Peterborough United	29 Jan 2014	
28 November 2013	–	ST	(England) Tom Hitchcock	(England) Crewe Alexandra	2 Jan 2014	
10 January 2014	–	ST	(England) Tom Hitchcock	(England) Rotherham United	31 May 2014	
30 January 2014	10	MF	(Morocco) Adel Taarabt	(Italy) Milan	31 May 2014	
31 January 2014	24	MF	(Mali) Samba Diakité	(England) Watford	31 May 2014	
14 February 2014	33	GK	(Brazil) Júlio César	(Canada) Toronto FC	31 May 2014	

== Season statistics ==
=== League table ===
Pos	Team	Pld	W	D	L	GF	GA	GD	Pts	Promotion, qualification or relegation
2	Burnley (P)	46	26	15	5	72	37	+35	93	Promotion to the Premier League
3	Derby County	46	25	10	11	84	52	+32	85	Qualification for Championship play-offs
4	Queens Park Rangers (O, P)	46	23	11	12	60	44	+16	80	Qualification for Championship play-offs
5	Wigan Athletic	46	21	10	15	61	48	+13	73	Qualification for Championship play-offs
6	Brighton & Hove Albion	46	19	15	12	55	40	+15	72	Qualification for Championship play-offs

Source: BBC Sport
Rules for classification: 1) points; 2) goal difference; 3) number of goals scored
(O) Play-off winners; (P) Promoted

l

=== Results summary ===
Overall								Home						Away					
Pld	W	D	L	GF	GA	GD	Pts	W	D	L	GF	GA	GD	W	D	L	GF	GA	GD
46	23	11	12	60	44	+16	80	15	6	2	38	18	+20	8	5	10	22	26	−4

Last updated: 3 May 2014.
Source: QPR.CO.UK

=== Results by matchday ===
Match	1	2	3	4	5	6	7	8	9	10	11	12	13	10	14	15	16	17	18	19	20	21	22	23	24	25	26	27	28	29	30	31	32	33	34	35	36	27	37	38	39	40	41	42	43	44	45	46
Venue	H	A	H	A	A	H	H	A	H	A	H	A	A	A	H	A	H	A	H	H	A	H	A	A	H	A	H	A	H	H	A	H	A	H	A	A	H	A	A	H	H	A	A	H	A	H	H	A
Result	W	D	W	W	W	W	D	W	W	P	W	D	L	D	W	D	W	L	W	D	W	L	L	D	W	W	W	P	W	D	L	L	L	D	W	L	W	L	W	W	D	L	L	W	L	W	D	W
Position	3	4	5	4	2	2	1	1	1	2	2	2	3	3	3	3	3	3	2	2	1	2	3	4	3	3	2	2	2	2	3	3	4	4	4	4	4	4	4	3	3	3	4	4	4	4	4	4

== Fixtures & results ==
=== Pre-season ===
11 July 2013 Friendly	Exeter City	0–0	Queens Park Rangers	Exeter
19:30 BST		Report		Stadium: St James Park; Attendance: 2,327; Referee: S. Bratt

13 July 2013 Friendly	Peterborough United	1–0	Queens Park Rangers	Peterborough
15:00 BST	Sinclair 86'	Report		Stadium: London Road Stadium; Attendance: 2,717; Referee: D. Deadman

18 July 2013 Friendly	Beşiktaş (Turkey)	0–1	Queens Park Rangers	Spittal an der Drau, Austria
18:00 CET		Report	Johnson 64'	Stadium: Seeboden Stadium; Attendance: 561

20 July 2013 Friendly	Udinese (Italy)	2–1	Queens Park Rangers	Villach, Austria
17:00 CET	Basta 48'; Naldo 60'	Report	Sutherland 68'	Stadium: Stadion Villach-Lind; Attendance: 1,294

26 July 2013 Friendly	Southend United	1–3	Queens Park Rangers	Southend-on-Sea
19:45 BST	Hill 24' (o.g.)	Report	Johnson 11'; Mbia 46'; Onuoha 86'	Stadium: Roots Hall

=== Championship ===
3 August 2013 1	Queens Park Rangers	2–1	Sheffield Wednesday	London
15:00 BST	Onuoha 40'; Johnson 43'	Report	Nuhiu 1'	Stadium: Loftus Road; Attendance: 17,626; Referee: S. Mathieson

10 August 2013 2	Huddersfield Town	1–1	Queens Park Rangers	Huddersfield
15:00 BST	Vaughan 35'	Report	Hoilett 38'	Stadium: John Smith's Stadium; Attendance: 13,896; Referee: A. Haines

17 August 2013 3	Queens Park Rangers	1–0	Ipswich Town	London
15:00 BST	Hitchcock 90'	Report		Stadium: Loftus Road; Attendance: 17,075; Referee: M. Naylor

24 August 2013 4	Bolton Wanderers	0–1	Queens Park Rangers	Bolton
12:15 BST		Report	Johnson 54'	Stadium: Reebok Stadium; Attendance: 14,999; Referee: J. Adcock

31 August 2013 5	Leeds United	0–1	Queens Park Rangers	Leeds
12:15 BST		Report	Hill 75'	Stadium: Elland Road; Attendance: 23,341; Referee: S. Attwell

14 September 2013 6	Queens Park Rangers	1–0	Birmingham City	London
15:00 BST	Austin 49'	Report		Stadium: Loftus Road; Attendance: 16,953; Referee: M. Jones

18 September 2013 7	Queens Park Rangers	0–0	Brighton & Hove Albion	London
19:45 BST		Report		Stadium: Loftus Road; Attendance: 17,246; Referee: A. Madley

21 September 2013 8	Yeovil Town	0–1	Queens Park Rangers	Yeovil
15:00 BST		Report	Austin 75' (pen.)	Stadium: Huish Park; Attendance: 9,108; Referee: G. Ward

28 September 2013 9	Queens Park Rangers	2–0	Middlesbrough	London
15:00 BST	Barton 4'; Austin 35' (pen.)	Report		Stadium: Loftus Road; Attendance: 17,081; Referee: D. Deadman

1 October 2013	Wigan Athletic	PP	Queens Park Rangers

5 October 2013 10	Queens Park Rangers	2–0	Barnsley	London
15:00 BST	Austin 66', 87' (pen.)	Report		Stadium: Loftus Road; Attendance: 16,202; Referee: D. Phillips

19 October 2013 11	Millwall	2–2	Queens Park Rangers	London
15:00 BST	McDonald 51'; Easter 90+2'	Report	Kranjčar 26'; Austin 69'	Stadium: The Den; Attendance: 13,727; Referee: M. Dean

26 October 2013 12	Burnley	2–0	Queens Park Rangers	Burnley
15:00 BST	Ings 65', 88' (pen.)	Report		Stadium: Turf Moor; Attendance: 16,074; Referee: S. Hooper

29 October 2013 13	Wigan Athletic	0–0	Queens Park Rangers	Wigan
19:45 GMT		Report		Stadium: The DW Stadium; Attendance: 13,143; Referee: M. Naylor

2 November 2013 14	Queens Park Rangers	2–1	Derby County	London
15:00 GMT	Jenas 11'; Eustace 63' (o.g.)	Report	Dawkins 23'	Stadium: Loftus Road; Attendance: 18,171; Referee: J. Moss

9 November 2013 15	Reading	1–1	Queens Park Rangers	Reading
12:15 GMT	McCleary 62'	Report	Barton 78'	Stadium: Madejski Stadium; Attendance: 21,497; Referee: A. Taylor

23 November 2013 16	Queens Park Rangers	1–0	Charlton Athletic	London
15:00 GMT	Austin 40'	Report		Stadium: Loftus Road; Attendance: 17,397; Referee: D. Whitestone

30 November 2013 17	Doncaster Rovers	2–1	Queens Park Rangers	Doncaster
15:00 GMT	Robinson 48'; Quinn 89'	Report	Austin 43'	Stadium: Keepmoat Stadium; Attendance: 8,854; Referee: O. Langford

3 December 2013 18	Queens Park Rangers	3–0	Bournemouth	London
7:45 GMT	Austin 27'; Hoilett 54'; Phillips 77'	Report		Stadium: Loftus Road; Attendance: 16,331; Referee: A. Woolmer

7 December 2013 19	Queens Park Rangers	0–0	Blackburn Rovers	London
15:00 GMT		Report		Stadium: Loftus Road; Attendance: 15,987; Referee: D. Drysdale

14 December 2013 20	Blackpool	0–2	Queens Park Rangers	Blackpool
15:00 GMT		Report	Phillips 61'; Austin 73'	Stadium: Bloomfield Road; Attendance: 13,822; Referee: S. Attwell

21 December 2013 21	Queens Park Rangers	0–1	Leicester City	London
12:15 GMT	Barton (yellow card) 84' (yellow-red card)	Report	Vardy 41'	Stadium: Loftus Road; Attendance: 17,713; Referee: P. Tierney

26 December 2013 22	Nottingham Forest	2–0	Queens Park Rangers	Nottingham
19:30 GMT	Halford 29'; Reid 80'	Report		Stadium: City Ground; Attendance: 22,721; Referee: K. Stroud

29 December 2013 23	Watford	0–0	Queens Park Rangers	Watford
15:00 GMT		Report		Stadium: Vicarage Road; Attendance: 16,625; Referee: N. Swarbrick

1 January 2014 24	Queens Park Rangers	2–1	Doncaster Rovers	London
15:00 GMT	Phillips 55'; Austin 90+3'	Report	Robinson 43'	Stadium: Loftus Road; Attendance: 15,807; Referee: G. Scott

11 January 2014 25	Ipswich Town	1–3	Queens Park Rangers	Ipswich
15:00 GMT	Smith 90+1'	Report	Kranjčar 52'; O'Neil 66'; Traoré 74'	Stadium: Portman Road; Attendance: 18,369; Referee: P. Dowd

18 January 2014 26	Queens Park Rangers	2–1	Huddersfield Town	London
15:00 GMT	Austin 55', 79'	Report	Wells 68'	Stadium: Loftus Road; Attendance: 17,185; Referee: S. Hooper

25th January, 2014	Sheffield Wednesday	pp	Queens Park Rangers	Sheffield
				Stadium: Hillsborough

28 January 2014 27	Queens Park Rangers	2–1	Bolton Wanderers	London
19:45 GMT	Austin 41'; Henry 50'	Report	Spearing 85'	Stadium: Loftus Road; Attendance: 15,097; Referee: A. D'Urso

1 February 2014 28	Queens Park Rangers	3–3	Burnley	London
12:15 GMT	Doyle 6'; Dunne 34'; Maïga 79'	Report	Ings 25'; Vokes 54', 62'	Stadium: Loftus Road; Attendance: 16,393; Referee: R. East

10 February 2014 29	Derby County	1–0	Queens Park Rangers	Derby
19:45 GMT	Eustace 20'	Report		Stadium: iPro Stadium; Attendance: 23,495; Referee: M. Naylor

16 February 2014 30	Queens Park Rangers	1–3	Reading	London
15:30 GMT	Doyle 20'	Report	Williams 10'; Pearce 56'; McCleary 58'; Gorkšs (red card) 71'	Stadium: Loftus Road; Attendance: 16,522; Referee: D. Coote

22 February 2014 31	Charlton Athletic	1–0	Queens Park Rangers	London
15:00 GMT	Jackson 90+2'	Report		Stadium: The Valley; Attendance: 17,333; Referee: E. Ilderton

1 March 2014 32	Queens Park Rangers	1–1	Leeds United	London
12:15 GMT	Jenas 44'	Report	McCormack 14'	Stadium: Loftus Road; Attendance: 16,448; Referee: C. Foy

8 March 2014 33	Birmingham City	0–2	Queens Park Rangers	Birmingham
15:00 GMT		Report	Morrison 14', 73'	Stadium: St. Andrews; Attendance: 14,500; Referee: G. Scott

11 March 2014 34	Brighton & Hove Albion	2–0	Queens Park Rangers	Brighton
19:45 GMT	Ulloa 77'; Ward 86'	Report		Stadium: AMEX Stadium; Attendance: 28,019; Referee: R. Madley

15 March 2014 35	Queens Park Rangers	3–0	Yeovil Town	London
15:00 GMT	Morrison 25', 90+1'; Zamora 70'	Report		Stadium: Loftus Road; Attendance: 16,667; Referee: M. Brown

18 March 2014 36	Sheffield Wednesday	3–0	Queens Park Rangers	Sheffield
19:45 GMT	Maguire 35' (pen.); Best 51'; Buxton 71'	Report	Dunne (red card) 33'	Stadium: Hillsborough; Attendance: 18,029; Referee: P. Tierney

22 March 2014 37	Middlesbrough	1–3	Queens Park Rangers	Middlesbrough
15:00 GMT	Friend 18'	Report	Benayoun 45+1'; Zamora 90+4'; Morrison 90+6'	Stadium: Riverside Stadium; Attendance: 15,075; Referee: K. Hill

25 March 2014 38	Queens Park Rangers	1–0	Wigan Athletic	London
19:45 GMT	Benayoun 16', (yellow card) 90+2' (yellow-red card)	Report		Stadium: Loftus Road; Attendance: 14,649; Referee: S. Hooper

29 March 2014 39	Queens Park Rangers	1–1	Blackpool	London
15:00 GMT	Hoilett 78'	Report	Goodwillie 11'	Stadium: Loftus Road; Attendance: 16,638; Referee: C. Boyeson

5 April 2014 40	Bournemouth	2–1	Queens Park Rangers	Bournemouth
15:00 BST	Elphick 45+1'; Grabban 60'; Arter (red card) 68'	Report	Traoré 46'	Stadium: Dean Court; Attendance: 11,307; Referee: J. Moss

8 April 2014 41	Blackburn Rovers	2–0	Queens Park Rangers	Blackburn
19:45 BST	Gestede 9'; Spurr 49'	Report		Stadium: Ewood Park; Attendance: 12,915; Referee: J. Adcock

12 April 2014 42	Queens Park Rangers	5–2	Nottingham Forest	London
12:22 BST	Benayoun 2'; Hoilett 43'; Onuoha 84'; Morrison 90'; Zamora 90+2'	Report	Lascelles 37'; Derbyshire 75'	Stadium: Loftus Road; Attendance: 17,220; Referee: O. Langford

19 April 2014 43	Leicester City	1–0	Queens Park Rangers	Leicester
12:15 BST	Nugent 68'	Report	Assou-Ekotto (yellow card) 78' (yellow-red card)	Stadium: King Power Stadium; Attendance: 27,386; Referee: S. Duncan

21 April 2014 44	Queens Park Rangers	2–1	Watford	London
15:00 BST	Barton 76'; Austin 90'	Report	Ranégie 51'	Stadium: Loftus Road; Attendance: 16,951; Referee: J. Linnington

26 April 2014 45	Queens Park Rangers	1–1	Millwall	London
15:00 BST	Austin 78' (pen.)	Report	Malone 90+1'	Stadium: Loftus Road; Attendance: 15,725; Referee: K. Friend

3 May 2014 46	Barnsley	2–3	Queens Park Rangers	Barnsley
12:15 BST	O'Grady 54', 90'	Report	Austin 42'; Mvoto 43' (o.g.); Yun 68'	Stadium: Oakwell; Attendance: 10,298; Referee: K. Wright

==== Championship play-offs ====
9 May 2014 Semi-final first leg	Wigan Athletic	0–0	Queens Park Rangers	DW Stadium, Wigan
19:45 BST		BBC Report		Attendance: 14,560; Referee: Mike Jones

12 May 2014 Semi-final second leg	Queens Park Rangers	2–1 (a.e.t.) (2–1 agg.)	Wigan Athletic	Loftus Road, London
19:45 BST	Austin 73' (pen.), 96'	BBC Report	Perch 9'	Attendance: 17,061; Referee: Mark Clattenburg

24 May 2014 Final	Derby County	0–1	Queens Park Rangers	Wembley Stadium, London
15:00 BST		Report	Zamora 90'	Attendance: 87,348; Referee: Lee Mason

=== FA Cup ===
4 January 2014 Round 3	Everton (Premier League)	4–0	Queens Park Rangers	Liverpool
15:00 GMT	Barkley 35'; Jelavić 44', 68'; Coleman 76'	Report		Stadium: Goodison Park; Attendance: 32,283; Referee: Howard Webb

=== Capital One Cup ===
6 August 2013 Round 1	Exeter City (League Two)	0–2	Queens Park Rangers	Exeter
19:45 BST		Report	Austin 3'; Simpson 50'	Stadium: St James Park; Attendance: 5,253; Referee: J. Simpson

27 August 2013 Round 2	Queens Park Rangers	0–2	Swindon Town (League One)	London
19:45 BST	Suk-Young (yellow card) 40'	Report	Ranger 38'; Pritchard 90+1'	Stadium: Loftus Road; Attendance: 9,715

== Player statistics ==
=== Appearances, goals and discipline ===
No	Pos	Name	League		FA Cup		Capital One Cup		Total		Discipline	
No	Pos	Name	Apps	Goals	Apps	Goals	Apps	Goals	Apps	Goals	Yellow card	Red card
1	GK	(England) Robert Green	48	0	0	0	0	0	48	0	0	0
2	MF	(England) Danny Simpson	35 (1)	0	1	0	2	1	38 (1)	1	2	0
3	DF	(Senegal) Armand Traoré	14 (11)	2	1	0	0	0	15 (11)	2	0	0
4	MF	(England) Shaun Derry	0	0	0	0	0 (1)	0	0 (1)	0	0	0
4	MF	(England) Ravel Morrison	15 (2)	6	0	0	0	0	15 (2)	6	2	0
5	DF	(Republic of Ireland) Richard Dunne	45	1	0	0	1	0	46	1	6	1
6	DF	(England) Clint Hill	43	1	1	0	2	0	46	1	4	0
7	MF	(Scotland) Matt Phillips	14 (8)	3	1	0	0	0	15 (8)	3	2	0
8	FW	(England) Andy Johnson	10 (8)	2	0 (1)	0	0 (2)	0	10 (11)	2	2	0
9	FW	(England) Charlie Austin	31 (3)	19	1	0	1 (1)	1	33 (4)	20	3	0
10	MF	(England) Tom Carroll	24 (3)	0	0	0	0	0	24 (3)	0	2	0
11	MF	(England) Shaun Wright-Phillips	3 (8)	0	0	0	1(1)	0	4 (9)	0	0	0
12	FW	(England) Will Keane	6 (4)	0	0	0	0	0	6 (4)	0	0	0
13	DF	(South Korea) Yun Suk-young	4 (5)	1	0	0	2	0	6 (5)	1	0	0
14	FW	(Republic of Ireland) Kevin Doyle	10 (2)	2	0	0	0	0	10 (2)	2	0	0
15	DF	(England) Nedum Onuoha	28 (2)	2	1	0	1	0	30 (2)	2	2	0
16	MF	(England) Jermaine Jenas	15 (11)	2	0	0	2	0	18 (11)	2	1	0
17	DF	(England) Joey Barton	37 (1)	3	1	0	1	0	38 (1)	3	15	1
18	MF	(Uruguay) Javier Chevantón	0 (2)	0	0	0	0	0	0 (2)	0	0	0
18	DF	(Northern Ireland) Aaron Hughes	11	0	0	0	0	0	11	0	0	0
19	MF	(Croatia) Niko Kranjčar	24 (9)	2	0(1)	0	0	0	24 (10)	2	4	0
20	MF	(England) Karl Henry	15 (12)	1	1	0	0	0	16 (12)	1	2	0
21	DF	(England) Luke Young	1	0	0	0	0	0	1	0	0	0
22	MF	(England) Hogan Ephraim	0	0	0	0	0	0	0	0	0	0
23	MF	(Canada) Junior Hoilett	26 (12)	4	0	0	1	0	27 (12)	4	3	0
24	MF	(Mali) Samba Diakité	0	0	0	0	1	0	1	0	0	0
24	DF	(United States) Oguchi Onyewu	0	0	0	0	0	0	0	0	0	0
25	FW	(England) Bobby Zamora	7 (12)	4	0	0	2	0	9 (12)	4	1	0
26	GK	(Republic of Ireland) Brian Murphy	1 (1)	0	0	0	2	0	3 (1)	0	0	0
27	DF	(Republic of Ireland) Michael Harriman	0	0	0	0	0	0	0	0	0	0
28	DF	(Germany) Max Ehmer	0 (1)	0	0	0	0	0	0 (1)	0	0	0
29	FW	(England) Tom Hitchcock	0 (1)	1	0	0	0 (1)	0	0 (2)	1	0	0
30	MF	(Republic of Ireland) Frankie Sutherland	0	0	0	0	0	0	0	0	0	0
32	MF	(Argentina) Alejandro Faurlín	5 (2)	0	0	0	2	0	7 (2)	0	1	0
33	GK	(Brazil) Júlio César	0	0	1	0	0	0	1	0	0	0
34	FW	(England) Mo Shariff	0	0	0	0	0 (1)	0	0 (1)	0	0	0
35	MF	(Israel) Yossi Benayoun	11 (5)	3	0 (1)	0	0	0	11 (6)	3	2	1
36	MF	(England) Gary O'Neil	26 (7)	1	1	0	0	0	27 (7)	1	4	1
38	DF	(Scotland) Coll Donaldson	1	0	1	0	0	0	1	0	0	0
38	FW	(Brazil) Dellatorre	0	0	0	0	0	0	0	0	0	0
39	DF	(Cameroon) Benoît Assou-Ekotto	31 (1)	0	1	0	0	0	32 (1)	0	5	1
40	MF	(Mali) Modibo Maïga	2 (6)	1	0	0	0	0	2 (6)	1	0	0
42	MF	(Canada) Michael Petrasso	0 (1)	0	0	0	0	0	0 (1)	0	0	0

=== Goalscorers ===
Rk	Player	Pos	League	FA Cup	League Cup	Total
1	(England) Charlie Austin	FW	17	0	1	18
2	(England) Ravel Morrison	MF	6	0	0	6
3	(Canada) Junior Hoilett	MF	4	0	0	4
3	(England) Bobby Zamora	FW	4	0	0	4
5	(Scotland) Matt Phillips	MF	3	0	0	3
5	(England) Jermaine Jenas	MF	3	0	0	3
5	(Israel) Yossi Benayoun	MF	3	0	0	3
5	(England) Joey Barton	MF	3	0	0	3
9	(England) Andy Johnson	FW	2	0	0	2
9	(Croatia) Niko Kranjčar	MF	2	0	0	2
9	(Republic of Ireland) Kevin Doyle	FW	2	0	0	2
9	(Senegal) Armand Traoré	DF	2	0	0	2
9	(England) Nedum Onuoha	DF	2	0	0	2
14	(Mali) Modibo Maïga	FW	1	0	0	1
14	(Republic of Ireland) Richard Dunne	DF	1	0	0	1
14	(England) Clint Hill	DF	1	0	0	1
14	(England) Tom Hitchcock	FW	1	0	0	1
14	(England) Gary O'Neil	MF	1	0	0	1
14	(England) Karl Henry	MF	1	0	0	1
14	(South Korea) Yun Suk-young	DF	1	0	0	1
14	(England) Danny Simpson	DF	0	0	1	1
Totals			58	0	2	60

=== Clean sheets ===
As of 22 August 2015

Rank	Player	Position	Championship	League Cup	FA Cup	Total
1	(England) Robert Green	GK	18	0	0	18
2	(Republic of Ireland) Brian Murphy	GK	0	1	0	1
3	(Brazil) Júlio César	GK	0	0	0	0
Total			18	1	0	19
