= Tom James (English footballer) =

English footballer

Personal information
- Full name: Thomas James
- Date of birth: 19 October 1988 (age 38)
- Place of birth: Leamington Spa, England
- Position: Defender

Youth career
- Leamington

Senior career*
Years	Team	Apps	(Gls)
2006–2007	Leamington	14	(0)
2007–2011	Stratford Town		
2011–2012	Watford	0	(0)
2012–2013	Nuneaton Town	14	(0)
2013	→ Leamington (loan)	5	(0)
2013–2014	Daventry Town	33	(1)
2014–2015	Tamworth	29	(0)
2015–2016	Hednesford Town		
2016	→ Rugby Town (loan)	15	(0)
2016–2017	Leamington	26	(1)
2017	Banbury United		
2018–2020	Leamington	2	(0)
- * Club domestic league appearances and goals as of 20:30, 27 July 2025 (UTC)

Thomas James (born 17 October 1988) is an English footballer who plays as a defender.

== Playing career ==
=== Watford ===
Tom began his career in Leamington's Youth set up, and after progressing to the first team was part of Jason Cadden’s Midland Football Alliance double winning squad in 2006/07.

Following some impressive displays for Stratford Town, James was signed by Football League Championship side Watford on 5 August 2011.

Tom played his one and only game for Watford in an FA Cup tie against Bradford City on 7 January 2012, he came on as an 85th-minute substitute for Mark Yeates, Watford won the game 4–2.

Tom James was informed he would be released by Watford when his contract expired on 30 June 2012, and would be joined by teammates Rene Gilmartin, Chez Isaac and Michael Bryan.

=== Daventry Town ===
Tom signed for Southern Football League Division One Central side Daventry Town on 25 October 2013.

James went on to make 33 league appearances for Daventry Town and scored one goal.

=== Tamworth ===
On 10 June 2014, Tom James signed for Conference North side Tamworth.

=== Later career ===
Ahead of the 2016–17 season, James returned to his former club, Leamington. During 2017, James played for Banbury United.

In the 2018–19 and 2019–20 seasons, he once again played for Leamington. During those seasons, he was also a part of the coaching staff at the club.
