= 2013–14 Bradford City A.F.C. season =

Bradford City A.F.C.
2013–14 season
- Co-chairmen: Mark Lawn and Julien Rhodes
- Manager: Phil Parkinson
- Stadium: Valley Parade
- League One: 11th
- FA Cup: First Round
- League Cup: First Round
- Football League Trophy: First Round
- Top goalscorer: League: Nahki Wells (14); All: Nahki Wells (15)
Home colours	Away colours

The 2013–14 season was Bradford City's 111th season in their history, their 99th in the Football League and 101st in the league system of English football. It was their first season back in League One following six years in League Two, after they beat Northampton Town 3–0 in the 2012–13 League Two Playoff Final.

== Pre-season ==
Former sponsors JCT600 signed a three-year deal to become the club's main shirt sponsors once again after a seven-year absence. Coach Phil Parkinson signed a new three-year deal with the club, along with assistant Steve Parkin and Head of Sports Science Nick Allamby.

Parkinson took up one-year options on Jon McLaughlin, Gary Jones, Kyel Reid and Garry Thompson to keep them at the club for another season, while Andrew Davies signed a new two-year contract to stay with the Bantams. However, Steve Williams and Dean Overson were released after being deemed surplus to the club's requirements. Goalkeeper Matt Duke also left the Bantams to join League Two side Northampton Town, Duke stated that he loved his time at Bradford but at 36 years of age he is looking for more 1st team football. Parkinson announced that he had released winger Zavon Hines stating that the winger needed first team football and Bradford could not promise him that. The first signing of the season came as the Bantams announced that they had signed Rochdale midfielder Jason Kennedy on a 2 Year Deal. On the same day, young defender Carl McHugh also signed a 1 Year Extension to his contract after an impressive 2012–13 campaign. Another important player for the Bantams, Nathan Doyle, also signed a 1 Year Extension after impressing the coach and becoming a key figure in the Bradford side.

The second signing of the campaign came as Parkinson signed Watford winger Mark Yeates on a 2 Year Deal. Winger Will Atkinson left Bradford as he signed a 2 Year Deal with League Two side Southend United. During pre-season it was announced that trialist Raffaele De Vita had signed a 1 Year Deal with Bradford. Bradford announced that they had signed defender Matt Taylor from Charlton Athletic on a 2 Year Deal whilst Michael Nelson leaves City to join Scottish side Hibernian.

== Pre-season and friendlies ==
The Bantams started their pre-season with a 4–0 win against Guiseley. Bradford opened the scoring early with Alan Connell before the game evened out a little. Finally in the 73rd minute Nahki Wells rounded a defender and the keeper to score. This opened the floodgates and Ricky Ravenhill scored City's 3rd before trial player Raffaele De Vita scored the goal of the game to finish the scoring.

The next part of the Bantams pre-season was a tour of Ireland. They started this tour with a 4–1 win against Athlone Town. The Irish opened the scoring as Bradford defender James Meredith scored an own goal in the 23rd minute, however this was short lived as last season's top scorer Nahki Wells drove a shot into the bottom corner to equalize. The Bantams took the lead 8 minutes later as Mark Yeates blasted a drive into the other bottom corner, this soon became a 3–1 lead to Bradford when Raffaele De Vita's cross was bundled into the net by Rory McArdle. Alan Connell rounded off the scoring by slotting home a shot to make it 4–1. The second game on the Irish tour saw the Bantams face Bohemians, City once again went behind however this time it wasn't an own goal but rather an opposition player heading the ball in. This 1–0 lead was soon rubbed out by an equalizer to Garry Thompson who headed home a Jason Kennedy cross. Just after halftime the Bradford side dominated and this dominance paid off as Michael Nelson scored to make it 2–1. Youngster Louis Swain also added a goal before the game was wrapped up by a goal from Nahki Wells to ensure the Bantams won 4–1.

Bradford came back to England to face Grimsby Town, it was a hard-fought match and it took the Bantams until the 60th minute to score when James Hanson tapped in Garry Thompson's cross. Then Mark Yeates scored near the full-time whistle as he curled as free-kick into the bottom corner. Bradford won the game 2–0 and that meant they were unbeaten in 4 pre-season games. This run came to an end as the Bantams faced EFL Championship side Doncaster Rovers at Valley Parade. The Rovers took the lead in the 23rd minute but Bradford bounced back as Garry Thompson charged down the goalkeepers kick and the ball rolled into the net. However Doncaster scored with 5 minutes to go to ensure that Bradford lost for the first time this pre-season. A young Bradford side lost 2–1 to Harrogate Town in the final pre-season match before facing Huddersfield Town. Harrogate took the lead after 5 minutes but pressure from the Bantams allowed them to equalize with a Nathan Curtis goal, however soon after Harrogate took a 2–1 lead which they kept hold of despite some good chances from City.

Date	Opponents	H / A	Result F–A	Scorers	Attendance
13 July 2013	Guiseley	A	4–0	Connell 15', Wells 73', Ravenhill 79', De Vita 84'	
16 July 2013	Athlone Town	A	4–1	Wells 31', Yeates 38', McArdle 40', Connell 82'	
20 July 2013	Bohemians	A	4–1	Thompson 21', Nelson 45+1', Swain 48', Wells 78'	
23 July 2013	Grimsby Town	A	2–0	Hanson 60', Yeates 86'	
27 July 2013	Doncaster Rovers	H	1–2	Thompson 55'	2,850
30 July 2013	Harrogate Town	A	1–2	Curtis 36'	
12 August 2013	Bradford Park Avenue	A	1–0	De Vita 14' (pen.)	395

== League One ==
The fixtures for the 2013–14 season were released on 19 June at 09:00 BST.

Bradford's League One campaign started with a 2–2 draw against Bristol City, after going behind last season's top scorer Nahki Wells equalized before Bristol scored their second. However Rory McArdle headed in a cross to make sure the Bantams got a point from the match. The Bantams first home game was a 4–0 win against Carlisle United, Bradford raced into a 3–0 lead after half an hour with Mark Yeates scoring a spectacular goal followed by goals from Nahki Wells and James Hanson before Gary Jones added a second half goal. Bradford's first loss of the season came against Port Vale as the Bantams went down 2–1, their only goal coming from in form striker Nahki Wells. Bradford bounced back from this defeat with an outstanding 2–0 win over Yorkshire rivals Sheffield United with Wells scoring both of the Bantams goals. Bradford's last game of September was a 1–1 draw with Stevenage, the Bantams trailed earlier on due to a penalty but just after halftime Kyel Reid scored to equalize to ensure Bradford came away with a point.

September started great for Bradford as two James Hanson goals (followed by one each from Nahki Wells and Garry Thompson) ensured that they came away with a 4–0 win against Brentford. This performance was backed up by a 2–2 draw against Colchester United with Nahki Wells netting both times. A solitary goal from skipper Gary Jones was enough to secure a 1–0 win against Gillingham. The month ended on a high as Bradford beat Shrewsbury Town 2–1 thanks to a late 90th-minute winner from James Hanson after Kyel Reid had nabbed an equalizer earlier on in the game, this win took the Bantams to 5th place in the league.

=== Fixtures ===
Date	Opponents	H/A	Result F–A	Scorers	Attendance	League position
3 August 2013	Bristol City	A	2–2	Wells 33', McArdle 84'	13,862	10th
10 August 2013	Carlisle United	H	4–0	Yeates 20', Wells 25', Hanson 29', Jones 67'	13,641	5th
17 August 2013	Port Vale	A	1–2	Wells 60'	6,552	9th
24 August 2013	Sheffield United	H	2–0	Wells (2) 45', 87'	18,041	6th
31 August 2013	Stevenage	A	1–1	Reid 48'	3,242	7th
7 September 2013	Brentford	H	4–0	Hanson (2) 41', 69', Wells 60', Thompson 64'	13,621	5th
14 September 2013	Colchester United	H	2–2	Wells (2) 15', 53'	13,570	7th
21 September 2013	Gillingham	A	1–0	Jones 9'	n/a	6th
28 September 2013	Shrewsbury Town	H	2–1	Reid 60', Hanson 90'	14,128	5th
5 October 2013	Walsall	A	2–0	Reid 45', Hanson 47'	5,364	4th
13 October 2013	Tranmere Rovers	H	0–1		14,674	4th
19 October 2013	Crawley Town	A	0–1		3,836	5th
22 October 2013	Preston North End	A	2–2	Hanson 5', McArdle 73'	11,485	5th
26 October 2013	Wolverhampton Wanderers	H	1–2	De Vita 14'	18,044	6th
2 November 2013	Crewe Alexandra	A	0–0		5,428	6th
17 November 2013	Coventry City	H	3–3	Wells (3) 17', 28', 90' (pen.)	14,322	7th
23 November 2013	Milton Keynes Dons	A	3–2	Wells 21', Reid 43', Kennedy 85'	8,970	6th
26 November 2013	Notts County	H	1–1	Yeates 69'	12,808	6th
1 December 2013	Oldham Athletic	A	1–1	Wells 21'	7,180	8th
14 December 2013	Leyton Orient	H	1–1	Wells 90'	14,292	7th
21 December 2013	Peterborough United	A	1–2	Gray 76'	6,597	9th
26 December 2013	Rotherham United	H	0–1		18,218	11th
29 December 2013	Swindon Town	H	1–1	McArdle 16'	13,461	10th
1 January 2014	Notts County	A	0–3		4,919	12th
11 January 2014	Bristol City	H	1–1	Hanson 1'	13,050	12th
18 January 2014	Sheffield United	A	2–2	Jones 56', Hanson 63'	18,794	13th
28 January 2014	Preston North End	H	0–0		13,686	12th
1 February 2014	Wolverhampton Wanderers	A	0–2		19,498	13th
8 February 2014	Crewe Alexandra	H	3–3	Hanson 58', Jones (2) 59', 84'	13,343	13th
11 February 2014	Carlisle United	A	0–1		3,267	13th
18 February 2014	Port Vale	H	1–0	McHugh 90'	12,106	11th
22 February 2014	Milton Keynes Dons	H	1–0	Hanson 72'	13,501	11th
1 March 2014	Stevenage	H	2–3	Reach 11', Hanson 42'	13,033	11th
8 March 2014	Brentford	A	0–2		8,063	13th
11 March 2014	Colchester United	A	2–0	Hanson 16', Bennett 56'	2,605	11th
15 March 2014	Gillingham	H	1–1	McLean 10'	13,089	12th
22 March 2014	Shrewsbury Town	A	1–2	Davies 79'	5,181	13th
25 March 2014	Walsall	H	0–2		12,165	15th
29 March 2014	Leyton Orient	A	1–0	McLean 27'	5,165	12th
1 April 2014	Coventry City	A	0–0		1,673	12th
5 April 2014	Oldham Athletic	H	2–3	Reach 36', Jones 90'	14,920	12th
11 April 2014	Rotherham United	A	0–0		9,228	12th
18 April 2014	Peterborough United	H	1–0	Reach 26'	13,820	13th
21 April 2014	Swindon Town	A	0–1		8,377	14th
26 April 2014	Crawley Town	H	2–1	McLean 49', Thompson 85'	13,247	13th
3 May 2014	Tranmere Rovers	A	2–1	Stead 81', McLean 87'	9,598	11th

=== League table ===
Pos	Team	Pld	W	D	L	GF	GA	GD	Pts
9	Port Vale	46	18	7	21	59	73	−14	61
10	Milton Keynes Dons	46	17	9	20	63	65	−2	60
11	Bradford City	46	14	17	15	57	54	+3	59
12	Bristol City	46	13	19	14	70	67	+3	58
13	Walsall	46	14	16	16	49	49	0	58

Updated to match(es) played on 3 May 2014. Source: BBC Sport
Rules for classification: 1) Points; 2) Goal difference; 3) Number of goals scored

== FA Cup ==
City entered the FA Cup at the First Round stage with the other League One and Two clubs. The draw was made in October and the Bantams were drawn against Rotherham United. Bradford lost 3–0 after Rotherham played some good football to take an early lead.

Date	Round	Opponents	H / A	Result F–A	Scorers	Attendance
9 November 2013	Round 1	Rotherham United	A	0–3		7,667

== League Cup ==
City entered League Cup at the First Round stage. The draw for the first round was made on 17 June 2013 and the Bantams were drawn away against local EFL Championship side Huddersfield Town.

Bradford City were runners up in last years League Cup campaign however this time they failed to progress through the first round as Huddersfield Town beat them 2–1. Huddersfield went 2–0 up thanks to a brace from James Vaughan before Nahki Wells scored a consolation goal in the 15th minute.

Date	Round	Opponents	H / A	Result F–A	Scorers	Attendance
6 August 2013	Round 1	Huddersfield Town	A	1–2	Wells 90'	11,630

== Football League Trophy ==
City will begin their Football League Trophy campaign in the First Round stage along with the other clubs from League One and League Two.

The Bantams were drawn against League Two side Hartlepool United for the First Round however they were knocked out as the League Two side hammered the Bantams 5–0 with ex Bradford players Jack Compton and Nialle Rodney among the scorers.

Date	Round	Opponents	H / A	Result F–A	Scorers	Attendance
3 September 2013	Round 1	Hartlepool United	A	0–5		1,740

== Squad statistics ==
No.	Pos.	Name	League		FA Cup		League Cup		League Trophy		Total		Discipline	
No.	Pos.	Name	Apps	Goals	Apps	Goals	Apps	Goals	Apps	Goals	Apps	Goals	Yellow card	Red card
1	GK	(Scotland) Jon McLaughlin	46	0	1	0	1	0	0	0	48	0	1	0
2	DF	(England) Stephen Darby	46	0	1	0	1	0	1	0	49	0	4	0
3	DF	(Australia) James Meredith	24(2)	0	1	0	0(1)	0	1	0	26(3)	0	2	0
4	DF	(England) Matthew Dolan	9(2)	0	0	0	0	0	0	0	9(2)	0	1	0
5	DF	(England) Andrew Davies	28	1	0	0	0	0	0	0	28	1	2	0
6	DF	(England) Adam Drury	11(1)	0	0	0	0	0	0	0	11(1)	0	3	0
7	MF	(England) Kyel Reid	21(5)	4	1	0	1	0	0(1)	0	23(6)	4	3	0
8	MF	(England) Jason Kennedy	5(4)	1	0(1)	0	1	0	1	0	7(5)	1	0	0
9	FW	(England) James Hanson	34(1)	12	1	0	0(1)	0	0	0	35(2)	12	4	0
10	FW	(Scotland) Andy Gray	2(6)	1	0	0	0	0	0	0	2(6)	1	1	0
11	MF	(England) Garry Thompson	29(15)	2	0	0	1	0	1	0	31(15)	2	4	0
12	GK	(England) Arron Jameson	0	0	0	0	0	0	0	0	0	0	0	0
14	MF	(Republic of Ireland) Mark Yeates	10(19)	2	0(1)	0	0	0	1	0	11(20)	2	2	0
15	DF	(England) Matt Taylor	1(1)	0	0	0	1	0	1	0	3(1)	0	0	0
16	DF	(Republic of Ireland) Carl McHugh	11(3)	1	0	0	1	0	0(1)	0	12(4)	1	4	0
17	FW	(England) Jon Stead	8	1	0	0	0	0	0	0	8	1	0	0
18	MF	(England) Gary Jones	43(2)	6	1	0	0	0	0	0	44(2)	6	4	0
19	MF	(England) Jordan Graham	0(1)	0	0	0	0	0	0	0	0(1)	0	0	0
20	MF	(Italy) Raffaele De Vita	6(14)	1	1	0	1	0	1	0	9(14)	1	1	0
21	FW	(England) Aaron McLean	18(2)	4	0	0	0	0	0	0	18(2)	4	1	0
22	DF	(England) Matthew Bates	20(2)	0	1	0	0	0	0	0	21(2)	0	0	0
23	DF	(Northern Ireland) Rory McArdle	41	3	1	0	0	0	1	0	43	3	9	0
24	MF	(England) Nathan Doyle	34(5)	0	1	0	1	0	1	0	37(5)	0	6	1
25	-	(England) Lewis Clarkson	0(1)	0	0	0	0	0	0	0	0(1)	0	0	0
26	FW	(England) Louie Swain	0	0	0	0	0	0	0	0	0	0	0	0
27	FW	(England) Oli McBurnie	2(6)	0	0(1)	0	0	0	0	0	2(7)	0	0	0
28	MF	(England) Adam Reach	18	3	0	0	0	0	0	0	18	3	1	0
29	MF	(England) Chris Atkinson	1(3)	0	0	0	0	0	0	0	1(3)	0	0	0
32	MF	(England) Kyle Bennett	14(4)	1	0	0	0	0	0	0	14(4)	1	0	1
-	MF	(England) Forrayah Bass	0	0	0	0	0	0	0	0	0	0	0	0
-	DF	(England) Connor Erangey	0	0	0	0	0	0	0	0	0	0	0	0
-	FW	(England) Nathan Curtis	0	0	0	0	0	0	0	0	0	0	0	0
-	MF	(England) Calum Hepworth	0	0	0	0	0	0	0	0	0	0	0	0
-	GK	(England) Connor Ripley	0	0	0	0	0	0	1	0	1	0	0	0
-	FW	(England) Caleb Folan	0(6)	0	0	0	0	0	0	0	0(6)	0	1	0
-	FW	(Bermuda) Nahki Wells	18(1)	14	1	0	0(1)	1	0	0	19(2)	15	1	0
-	MF	(England) Ricky Ravenhill	3(4)	0	0	0	1	0	1	0	5(4)	0	2	0
-	DF	(England) Luke Oliver	3(1)	0	0	0	0	0	0	0	3(1)	0	1	0
-	FW	(England) Alan Connell	0(13)	0	0	0	1	0	0(1)	0	1(14)	0	0	0
-	–	Own goals	–	0	–	0	–	0	–	0	–	0	–	–

Statistics accurate as of 3 May 2014

== Transfers ==
=== In ===
Date	Pos.	Name	From	Fee
2 July 2013	MF	Jason Kennedy	Rochdale	Free
3 July 2013	MF	Mark Yeates	Watford	Free
30 July 2013	MF	Raffaele De Vita	Swindon Town	Free
1 August 2013	DF	Matt Taylor	Charlton Athletic	Free
28 September 2013	FW	Caleb Folan	T-Team	Free
13 October 2013	DF	Matthew Bates	Bristol City	Free
16 January 2014	FW	Aaron McLean	Hull City	Undisclosed Fee

=== Loan In ===
Date	Pos.	Name	From	Until
10 January 2014	GK	Arron Jameson	Sheffield Wednesday	End of Season
10 January 2014	MF	Jordan Graham	Aston Villa	8 February 2014
23 January 2014	MF	Adam Reach	Middlesbrough	21 April 2014
24 January 2014	MF	Chris Atkinson	Huddersfield Town	End of Season
24 January 2014	MF	Kyle Bennett	Doncaster Rovers	End of Season
8 February 2014	DF	Matthew Dolan	Doncaster Rovers	End of Season
7 March 2014	DF	Adam Drury	Leeds United	End of Season
27 March 2014	FW	Jon Stead	Huddersfield Town	End of Season

=== Loan Out ===
Date	Pos.	Name	From	Until
24 January 2014	MF	Jason Kennedy	Rochdale	End of Season

=== Out ===
Date	Pos.	Name	To	Fee
28 May 2013	FW	Adam Baker	Released	Free
30 May 2013	DF	Steve Williams	Macclesfield Town	Free
30 May 2013	DF	Dean Overson	Released	Free
24 June 2013	GK	Matt Duke	Northampton Town	Free
1 July 2013	FW	Zavon Hines	Released	Free
4 July 2013	MF	Will Atkinson	Southend United	Free
1 August 2013	DF	Michael Nelson	Hibernian	Free
27 December 2013	FW	Caleb Folan	Released	Free
10 January 2014	FW	Nahki Wells	Huddersfield Town	£1.5 million + Add Ons
30 January 2014	FW	Alan Connell	Northampton Town	Free
30 January 2014	MF	Ricky Ravenhill	Northampton Town	Free
31 January 2014	DF	Luke Oliver	Released	Free

== See also ==
- List of Bradford City A.F.C. seasons
