= Sean Murray (footballer, born 1993) =

Association football player (born 1993)

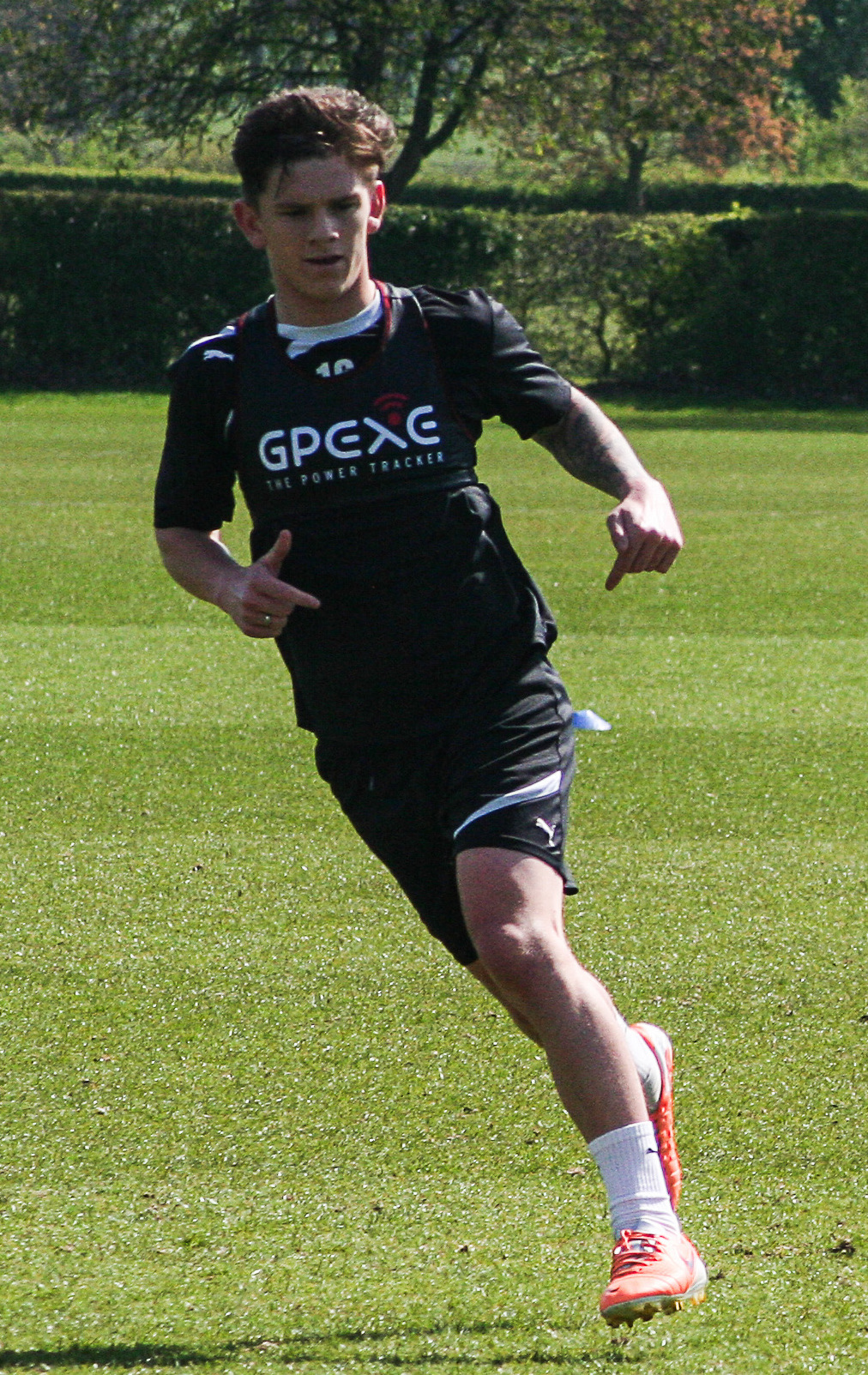
- Murray training with Watford in April 2014

Personal information
- Full name: Sean Michael Murray
- Date of birth: 11 October 1993 (age 33)
- Place of birth: Abbots Langley, England
- Height: 5 ft 9 in (1.75 m)
- Position: Midfielder

Team information
- Current team: Ballymena United
- Number: 26

Youth career
- –2002: Evergreen
- 2002–2010: Watford

Senior career*
Years	Team	Apps	(Gls)
2010–2016	Watford	75	(11)
2015	→ Wigan Athletic (loan)	7	(0)
2016–2017	Swindon Town	18	(1)
2017–2018	Colchester United	53	(3)
2018–2019	Vejle BK	11	(0)
2019–2021	Dundalk	59	(10)
2022–2024	Glentoran	36	(1)
2024	→ Cork City (loan)	19	(3)
2024–2025	Cork City	39	(0)
2026–	Ballymena United	8	(1)

International career^{‡}
2010	Republic of Ireland U17	2	(0)
2011–2012	Republic of Ireland U19	12	(1)
2012–2014	Republic of Ireland U21	9	(1)
- * Club domestic league appearances and goals as of 13:44, 27 May 2026 (UTC) ‡ National team caps and goals as of 08:39, 1 February 2017 (UTC)

Sean Michael Murray (born 11 October 1993) is a professional footballer who plays as a midfielder for NIFL Premiership club Ballymena United.

He progressed through the academy at Watford from the age of nine, and broke into the first-team in April 2011. He went on to make 85 first-team appearances for the club before being loaned to Wigan Athletic early in the 2015–16 season. He left Watford at the end of the season to join Swindon Town and then joined Colchester United in January 2017. He left Colchester in summer 2018 and joined Danish Superliga side Vejle Boldklub. In February 2019 he left Vejle Boldklub to sign for Irish side Dundalk.

Murray has represented the Republic of Ireland at under-17, under-19 and under-21 levels.

== Club career ==
=== Watford ===
Born in Abbots Langley, Hertfordshire, Murray joined Watford's youth system in 2002, aged nine. Beginning in 2007, he studied at Harefield Academy as part of the initial intake where Watford's youth players are developed. Despite interest from Manchester City, Murray signed his first professional contract with Watford in July 2010, although due to Football Association regulations, it did not take effect until his 17th-birthday. He made his debut for the Hornets as a substitute in a Championship game against Queens Park Rangers at Vicarage Road on 30 April 2011, a 2–0 defeat for Watford.

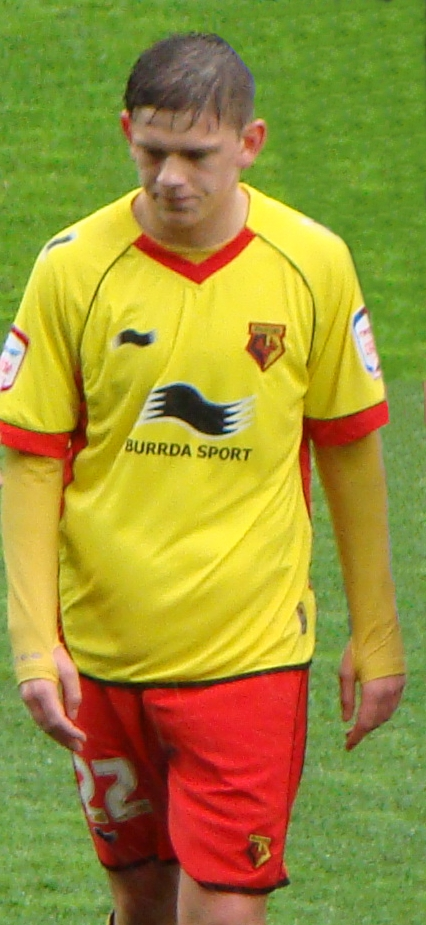
Sean Murray playing for Watford in April 2012

On the fringes of the first-team under new manager Sean Dyche, Murray had made just one late substitute appearance in the first half of the 2011–12 season before he was a surprise inclusion in the starting line-up for Watford's FA Cup third round tie with Tottenham Hotspur on 27 January 2012. He came close to scoring in the game, hitting the post in the second-half before being substituted as his side fell to a 1–0 defeat. Murray retained his place in the team, and scored his first professional goal three weeks later, with a deflected free kick in a 3–2 victory for Watford against Leicester City. Murray continued to play regularly for the rest of the season; his good form, scoring four goals in seven games, led to him winning the Football League Young Player of the Month award for March. He won Watford's Young Player of the Season award at the End of Season Awards Dinner for his great form since his introduction to the first team, after scoring seven goals in 19 appearances.

In August 2012, Murray signed a five-year deal with Watford, but following the Pozzo family takeover of Watford and an influx of new players, Murray was restricted to playing 16 games and scoring one goal during the 2012–13 season.

He marked his return to the first-team on 6 August 2013 with two goals in Watford's 3–1 League Cup victory against Bristol Rovers, and he went on to make 39 appearances and score a total of six goals across the campaign.

Murray was restricted to making just nine first-team appearances during the 2014–15 season, making what was to be his last appearance for the club against Chelsea in a 3–0 FA Cup third round defeat on 4 January 2015.

==== Wigan Athletic loan ====
On 5 August 2015, Murray moved to League One side Wigan Athletic in an initial one-month loan deal, later extended until January 2016. He made his debut as a substitute during Wigan's 2–0 defeat at Coventry City on 8 August.

Murray scored his first and only goal for Wigan against Blackpool in a 4–0 victory in the Football League Trophy on 10 November, before his loan was terminated on 16 December. He had made eight appearances for Wigan.

=== Swindon Town ===
League One club Swindon Town signed Murray on a free transfer on 31 August 2016 on a one-year deal, with the option of a further year. He made his club debut on 3 September as a substitute in Swindon's 2–2 League One draw at Peterborough United.

Murray scored his first and Swindon's only goal in their 3–1 home defeat by Northampton Town on 27 September. After 23 games for Town, Murray had his contract terminated by the club on 31 January 2017, having fallen out of favour under new director of football Tim Sherwood.

=== Colchester United ===
Immediately following his release from Swindon Town, Murray signed a one-and-a-half-year contract with League Two club Colchester United on 31 January 2017. Murray made his debut as a replacement for Craig Slater in the 65th minute of Colchester's 1–1 draw at Blackpool on 4 February. He was sent off for the first time in his career for a bad challenge on Blackpool's Jim McAlister in the fifth minute of injury time. He ended the season with 16 League Two appearances to his name.

Murray scored his first Colchester goal on 30 September 2017 in their 1–0 win at Yeovil Town. He required an operation on his knee in October 2017 which would rule him out of action for up to six weeks. He completed the season with 40 appearances and three goals.

On 29 June 2018, Colchester manager John McGreal announced that Murray had left the club after failing to agree a new deal.

=== Vejle Boldklub ===
On 26 July 2018, Danish Superliga side Vejle Boldklub announced the signing of Murray on a three-year contract. On 5 February 2019 Vejle announced, that they had mutually terminated the contract of the player.

=== Dundalk ===
On the same day as Murray left Vejle Boldklub, he signed a long-term contract with Dundalk. In his first season at the club, he scored three goals in 25 league appearances to help win the Premier Division title and League Cup. In the 2020 Europa league third Qualifying round, He scored Dundalk's equalizing goal against Sheriff Tiraspol and eventually won the penalty shootout. He scored the opening goal against KÍ in the 2020 Europa league play-offs helping Dundalk qualify for the 2020–21 UEFA Europa League group stage and scored again in the opening game against Molde FK.

=== Glentoran ===
Murray made the switch to NIFL Premiership side Glentoran as a free agent when the transfer window opened in January 2022.

==== Cork City ====
On 9 January 2024, Murray signed for League of Ireland First Division side Cork City on loan until the end of July. On 27 July 2024, the move was made permanent, with Murray signing a multi-year contract with the club. On 16 December 2025, his contract was cancelled by mutual consent.

=== Ballymena United ===
In January 2026, he signed for NIFL Premiership club Ballymena United.

== International career ==
Although born in England, Murray qualifies to play for the Republic of Ireland through his Irish grandparents. Murray twice represented the Republic of Ireland at under-17 level in UEFA competitions, making his debut against Finland on 21 March 2010 in a 1–0 win.

Murray made his debut at under-19 level on 24 May 2011 in the Ireland's 1–0 win against Poland. He scored his first goal for the side in a 3–0 win against Italy on 29 May 2011, and went on to make twelve appearances for the side in UEFA competitions.

Murray scored on his under-21 debut on 10 September 2012 in a 4–2 away win against Italy. In total, he earned nine caps for the under-21 side.

== Career statistics ==
As of match played on 15 April 2026

Appearances and goals by club, season and competition
Club	Season	League			National cup		League cup		Europe		Other		Total	
Club	Season	Division	Apps	Goals	Apps	Goals	Apps	Goals	Apps	Goals	Apps	Goals	Apps	Goals
Watford	2010–11	EFL Championship	2 (Note: Soccerbase does not list the Championship tie against Queens Park Rangers on 30 April 2011 in which Murray made his debut)	0	0	0	0	0	—		—		2	0
Watford	2011–12	EFL Championship	18	6	1	0	0	0	—		—		19	6
Watford	2012–13	EFL Championship	15	1	0	0	1	0	—		0	0	16	1
Watford	2013–14	EFL Championship	34	3	2	1	3	2	—		—		39	6
Watford	2014–15	EFL Championship	6	0	1	0	2	0	—		—		9	0
Watford	2015–16	Premier League	0	0	0	0	0	0	—		—		0	0
Watford	Total		75	11	4	1	6	2	—		0	0	85	14
Wigan Athletic (loan)	2015–16	EFL League One	7	0	0	0	0	0	—		1 (Note: Appearance in Football League Trophy)	1	8	1
Swindon Town	2016–17	EFL League One	18	1	2	0	0	0	—		3 (Note: Appearance(s) in EFL Trophy)	0	23	1
Colchester United	2016–17	EFL League Two	16	0	–		—		–		–		16	0
Colchester United	2017–18	EFL League Two	37	3	0	0	1	0	—		2	0	40	3
Colchester United	Total		53	3	0	0	1	0	—		2	0	56	3
Vejle Boldklub	2018–19	Danish Superliga	11	0	1	0	–		—		0	0	12	0
Dundalk	2019	LOI Premier Division	25	3	4	0	1	0	5 (Note: Three appearances in UEFA Champions League, two appearances in UEFA Europa League)	0	1 (Note: Appearance(s) in President of Ireland's Cup)	0	36	3
Dundalk	2020	LOI Premier Division	8	1	2	1	—		8 (Note: One appearance in UEFA Champions League; seven appearances, three goals in UEFA Europa League)	3	—		18	5
Dundalk	2021	LOI Premier Division	26	6	5	2	—		3 (Note: Appearance(s) in UEFA Europa Conference League)	0	0	0	34	8
Dundalk	Total		59	10	12	3	1	0	16	3	1	0	88	16
Glentoran	2021–22	NIFL Premiership	12	0	3	1	—		—		—		15	1
Glentoran	2022–23	NIFL Premiership	15	1	0	0	2	0	—		2 (Note: Appearance(s) in County Antrim Shield)	0	19	1
Glentoran	2023–24	NIFL Premiership	9	0	0	0	1	0	0 (Note: Appearance(s) in UEFA Europa Conference League)	0	2	0	12	0
Glentoran	Total		36	1	3	1	3	0	0	0	4	0	46	2
Cork City (loan)	2024	LOI First Division	19	3	1	0	—		—		0 (Note: Appearance(s) in Munster Senior Cup)	0	20	3
Cork City	2024	LOI First Division	8	0	1	0	—		—		—		9	0
Cork City	2025	LOI Premier Division	31	0	3	0	—		—		1	0	35	0
Cork City	Total		39	0	4	0	—		—		1	0	44	0
Ballymena United	NIFL Premiership	2025–26	8	1	0	0	1	0	—		9	1		
Career total			325	30	26	5	12	2	16	3	12	1	391	41

== Honours ==
=== Club ===
Dundalk

- League of Ireland Premier Division: 2019
- FAI Cup: 2020
- League of Ireland Cup: 2019
- President of Ireland's Cup: 2019, 2021
- Champions Cup: 2019

Cork City

- League of Ireland First Division: 2024
