= Nathan Curtis =

English footballer (born 1996)

Personal information
- Full name: Nathan Robert Curtis
- Date of birth: 7 February 1996 (age 30)
- Place of birth: Leeds, England
- Positions: Winger; striker

Youth career
- Bradford City

Senior career*
Years	Team	Apps	(Gls)
2012–2014	Bradford City	0	(0)
2014–2015	Ossett Town		
2015–2016	Spennymoor Town		
2016	Harrogate Railway Athletic		
2016	Frickley Athletic	15	(0)
2016–2017	Ossett Town		
2017	Ossett Albion		
2017–2018	Scarborough Athletic		
2018	Goole		
2018–2022	Belper Town		
- * Club domestic league appearances and goals as of 19:55, 16 January 2019 (UTC)

Nathan Robert Curtis (born 7 February 1996) is an English footballer who last played for Belper Town as a winger and striker.

== Career ==
Curtis made his senior debut for Bradford City on 18 December 2012 in the FA Cup, appearing as a substitute; he replaced fellow debutant Forrayah Bass during extra time. He was not given a squad number for the 2013–14 season, and he was re-classed by the club as an "Apprentice" for the season. He was released by the club at the end of the 2013–14 season.

In July 2014 he signed for Ossett Town. He moved to Spennymoor Town in 2015, before signing for Harrogate Railway Athletic in February 2016. He then played for Frickley Athletic between August and October 2016, before finishing the 2016–17 season at former club Ossett Town.

He next played for Ossett Albion, moving on to Scarborough Athletic in September 2017, before signing for Goole in March 2018. He began the 2018–19 season at Belper Town. Belper Town announced the departure of Curtis in July 2022.

== Career statistics ==
As of 18 December 2012

Club	Season	League		FA Cup		League Cup		Other		Total	
Club	Season	Apps	Goals	Apps	Goals	Apps	Goals	Apps	Goals	Apps	Goals
Bradford City	2012–13	0	0	1	0	0	0	0	0	1	0
Bradford City	2013–14	0	0	0	0	0	0	0	0	0	0
Career total		0	0	1	0	0	0	0	0	1	0
