= 2010–11 Bradford City A.F.C. season =

Bradford City A.F.C.
2010–11 season
- Chairman: Mark Lawn; Julian Rhodes
- Manager: Peter Taylor (resigned 27 February); Peter Jackson (interim)
- Football League Two: 18th
- FA Cup: First round
- League Cup: Second round
- Football League Trophy: Second round (Northern Section)
- Top goalscorer: League: Dave Syers (8); All: Dave Syers (10)
- Highest home attendance: 15,332 (versus Stockport County)
- Lowest home attendance: 4,221 (versus Preston North End)
- Average home league attendance: 11,128
| Home colours | Away colours | Third colours |

The 2010–11 Bradford City A.F.C. season was the 108th edition of the Bradford City A.F.C. history, their 96th in the Football League and 98th in the league system of English football. Their 2009–10 14th-place finish made the season their fourth successive season in League Two.

This article covers a period from 1 July 2010 to 30 June 2011.

They began their season with a defeat away at Shrewsbury Town. They then provided a shock during the League cup beating Championship side Nottingham Forest. They marked their first home league game of the season with a win over Stevenage F.C. The season then continued to be disappointing, eventually resulting in manager Peter Taylor leaving the club, with Peter Jackson taking charge as interim manager. The situation did not improve however, as the club slipped to its lowest league finish for many years. They ended the season with a 5–1 home defeat to Crewe. Interim manager Peter Jackson subsequently decided on a retained list, with 9 players released.

== Results ==
=== League Two ===
| 7 August 2010 Game 1 | Shrewsbury Town | 3–1 | Bradford City | Prostar Stadium |
| 15:00 | Robinson 33', 51', 55' | | Adeyemi 24' | Attendance: 6,993 |

| 14 August 2010 Game 2 | Bradford City | 1–0 | Stevenage | Valley Parade |
| 15:00 | Evans 32' (pen.) | | | Attendance: 10,967 |

| 21 August 2010 Game 3 | Torquay United | 2–0 | Bradford City | Plainmoor |
| 15:00 | Stevens 2'; Zebroski 66' | | | Attendance: 2,941 |

| 27 August 2010 Game 4 | Bradford City | 0–2 | Southend United | Valley Parade |
| 19:45 | | | Corr 16'; Grant 54' | Attendance: 10,752 |

| 4 September 2010 Game 5 | Bradford City | 0–2 | Port Vale | Valley Parade |
| 15:00 | | | M. Richards 32'; J. Richards 75' | Attendance: 10,834 |

| 11 September 2010 Game 6 | Stockport County | 1–1 | Bradford City | Edgeley Park |
| 15:00 | Donnelly 78' | | Syers 56' | Attendance: 4,277 |

| 18 September 2010 Game 7 | Bradford City | 1–0 | Gillingham | Valley Parade |
| 15:00 | Williams 90' | | | Attendance: 10,722 |

| 25 September 2010 Game 8 | Northampton Town | 2–0 | Bradford City | Sixfields Stadium |
| 15:00 | McKay 61'; Tozer 81' | | | Attendance: 4,646 |

| 28 September 2010 Game 9 | Rotherham United | 0–0 | Bradford City | Don Valley Stadium |
| 19:45 | | | | Attendance: 3,872 |

| 2 October 2010 Game 10 | Bradford City | 0–1 | Morecambe | Valley Parade |
| 15:00 | | | Mullin 23' | Attendance: 10,640 |

| 9 October 2010 Game 11 | Barnet | 0–2 | Bradford City | Underhill Stadium |
| 15:00 | | | Osborne 65'; Adeyemi 69' | Attendance: 2,435 |

| 16 October 2010 Game 12 | Bradford City | 3–1 | Cheltenham Town | Valley Parade |
| 15:00 | Syers 32'; Hendrie 74'; Hanson 87' | | Low 7' | Attendance: 10,537 |

| 23 October 2010 Game 13 | Burton Albion | 3–0 | Bradford City | Pirelli Stadium |
| 15:00 | Harrad 31' (pen.); Collins 54'; Penn 88' | | | Attendance: 3,143 |

| 30 October 2010 Game 14 | Bradford City | 5–0 | Oxford United | Valley Parade |
| 15:00 | Daley 48', 57'; Hendrie 66' (pen.); Syers 87'; Moult 90' | | | Attendance: 11,376 |

| 2 November 2010 Game 15 | Bury | 0–1 | Bradford City | Gigg Lane |
| 19:45 | | | Daley 30' (pen.) | Attendance: 3,521 |

| 13 November 2010 Game 16 | Wycombe Wanderers | 1–0 | Bradford City | Adams Park |
| 15:00 | Betsy 82' | | | Attendance: 4,077 |

| 20 November 2010 Game 17 | Bradford City | 0–1 | Macclesfield Town | Valley Parade |
| 15:00 | | | Draper 23' | Attendance: 10,779 |

| 23 November 2010 Game 18 | Bradford City | 1–1 | Accrington Stanley | Valley Parade |
| 19:45 | Price 54' | | Edwards 21' (pen.) | Attendance: 10,392 |

| 11 December 2010 Game 19 | Bradford City | 1–0 | Hereford United | Valley Parade |
| 15:00 | Syers 8' | | | Attendance: 10,460 |

| 28 December 2010 Game 20 | Cheltenham Town | 4–0 | Bradford City | Whaddon Road |
| 15:00 | Goulding 31', 67'; Pack 35'; Thomas 76' | | | Attendance: 2,666 |

| 1 January 2011 Game 21 | Lincoln City | 1–2 | Bradford City | Sincil Bank |
| 15:00 | Grimes 25' (pen.) | | Hanson 2'; Evans 42' | Attendance: 3,225 |

| 3 January 2011 Game 22 | Bradford City | 1–0 | Bury | Valley Parade |
| 19:45 | Daley 45' | | | Attendance: 11,384 |

| 8 January 2011 Game 23 | Bradford City | 1–3 | Barnet | Valley Parade |
| 15:00 | Oliver 45+3' | | Kiernan 61' (o.g.); Uddin 64'; Holmes 67' | Attendance: 10,514 |

| 15 January 2011 Game 24 | Oxford United | 2–1 | Bradford City | Kassam Stadium |
| 19:45 | MacLean 77'; Craddock 82' | | Syers 9' | Attendance: 7,068 |

| 18 January 2011 Game 25 | Aldershot Town | 0–0 | Bradford City | Recreation Ground |
| 15:00 | Charles 23' | | | Attendance: 2,160 |

| 25 January 2011 Game 26 | Crewe Alexandra | 2–1 | Bradford City | Alexandra Stadium |
| 15:00 | Donaldson 15'; Moore 40' | | Duff 39' | Attendance: 3,665 |

| 29 January 2011 Game 27 | Chesterfield | 2–2 | Bradford City | Proact Stadium |
| 19:45 | Whitaker 11'; Bowery 90+3' | | Syers 12'; Hanson 53' | Attendance: 7,556 |

| 1 February 2011 Game 28 | Bradford City | 1–2 | Lincoln City | Valley Parade |
| 15:00 | Hanson 4' | | Facey 42'; McCallum 79' | Attendance: 10,543 |

| 12 February 2011 Game 29 | Bradford City | 1–0 | Wycombe Wanderers | Valley Parade |
| 15:00 | Ellison 69' | | | Attendance: 10,897 |

| 18 February 2011 Game 30 | Port Vale | 2–1 | Bradford City | Vale Park |
| 15:00 | Pope 49', 64' | | Adeyemi 84' | Attendance: 4,775 |

| 22 February 2011 Game 31 | Bradford City | 0–1 | Chesterfield | Valley Parade |
| 19:45 | | | Smalley 16' | Attendance: 10,782 |

| 26 February 2011 Game 32 | Bradford City | 3–2 | Stockport County | Valley Parade |
| 15:00 | Williams 14', 74'; Evans 90+4' | | Turnbull 27'; Doble 40' | Attendance: 15,332 |

| 5 March 2011 Game 33 | Gillingham | 2–0 | Bradford City | Priestfield Stadium |
| 15:00 | Akinfenwa 43'; Weston 46' | | | Attendance: 5,019 |

| 8 March 2011 Game 34 | Bradford City | 2–1 | Rotherham United | Valley Parade |
| 19:45 | Hunt 16'; Adeyemi 90+1' | | Marshall 38' | Attendance: 10,910 |

| 12 March 2011 Game 35 | Morecambe | 0–1 | Bradford City | Globe Arena |
| 15:00 | | | Hanson 33' | Attendance: 3,521 |

| 19 March 2011 Game 36 | Bradford City | 1–1 | Northampton Town | Valley Parade |
| 15:00 | Speight 8' (pen.) | | Harrad 60' (pen.) | Attendance: 10,684 |

| 26 March 2011 Game 37 | Bradford City | 1–2 | Shrewsbury Town | Valley Parade |
| 15:00 | Adeyemi 67' | | Bradshaw 77', 87' | Attendance: 10,735 |

| 2 April 2011 Game 38 | Stevenage | 2–1 | Bradford City | Broadhall Way |
| 15:00 | Mousinho 37' (pen.); Charles 77' | | Syers 72' | Attendance: 3,079 |

| 5 April 2011 Game 39 | Macclesfield Town | 0–1 | Bradford City | Moss Rose |
| 15:00 | | | Hanson 24' | Attendance: 1,207 |

| 9 April 2011 Game 40 | Bradford City | 0–3 | Torquay United | Valley Parade |
| 15:00 | | | Nicholson 32'; Tomlin 48'; Kee 83' | Attendance: 10,894 |

| 15 April 2011 Game 41 | Southend United | 4–0 | Bradford City | Roots Hall |
| 15:00 | Corr 13' (pen.); Ferdinand 35'; Hall 25', 67' | | | Attendance: 5,217 |

| 19 April 2011 Game 42 | Bradford City | 1–1 | Burton Albion | Valley Parade |
| 15:00 | Speight 74' | | McGrath 41' | Attendance: 13,814 |

| 23 April 2011 Game 43 | Accrington Stanley | 3–0 | Bradford City | Crown Ground |
| 15:00 | Joyce 9'; Procter 16'; McConville 45' | | | Attendance: 2,815 |

| 25 April 2011 Game 44 | Bradford City | 2–1 | Aldershot Town | Valley Parade |
| 15:00 | Daley 4'; Syers 90' | | Vincenti 43' | Attendance: 10,965 |

| 30 April 2011 Game 45 | Hereford United | 1–1 | Bradford City | Edgar Street |
| 15:00 | Fleetwood 87' | | Speight 81' (pen.) | Attendance: 3,219 |

| 7 May 2011 Game 46 | Bradford City | 1–5 | Crewe Alexandra | Valley Parade |
| 15:00 | Speight 23' (pen.) | | Miller 12', 32'; Donaldson 34'; Shelley 45', 67' | Attendance: 11,030 |

=== League Cup ===
| 10 August 2010 Round 1 | Bradford City | 2 – 1 (a.e.t.) | Nottingham Forest | Valley Parade |
| 19:45 | Syers 57'; Hanson 100' | | Thornhill 35' | Attendance: 5,175 |

| 24 August 2010 Round 2 | Bradford City | 1 – 2 (a.e.t.) | Preston North End | Valley Parade |
| 19:45 | Speight 83' | | Coutts 45'; Treacy 109' | Attendance: 4,221 |

=== FA Cup ===
| 6 November 2010 Round 1 | Colchester United | 4–3 | Bradford City | Colchester Community Stadium |
| 19:45 | Bond 7'; Mooney 20', 64' (pen.); Wilson 54' | | Hanson 8', 79'; Syers 32' | Attendance: 2,736 |

=== Football League Trophy ===
| 5 October 2010 Round 1 | Hartlepool United | 1–0 | Bradford City | Victoria Park |
| 19:45 | McSweeney 69' | | | Attendance: 1,728 |

== League data ==
=== League table ===
| Pos | Team | Pld | W | D | L | GF | GA | GD | Pts |
|---|---|---|---|---|---|---|---|---|---|
| 16 | Northampton Town | 46 | 11 | 19 | 16 | 63 | 71 | −8 | 52 |
| 17 | Cheltenham Town | 46 | 13 | 13 | 20 | 56 | 77 | −21 | 52 |
| 18 | Bradford City | 46 | 15 | 7 | 24 | 43 | 68 | −25 | 52 |
| 19 | Burton Albion | 46 | 12 | 15 | 19 | 56 | 70 | −14 | 51 |
| 20 | Morecambe | 46 | 13 | 12 | 21 | 54 | 73 | −19 | 51 |

Updated to match(es) played on 28 May 2011. Source: The Football League
Rules for classification: 1) points; 2) goal difference; 3) number of goals scored.

=== Results summary ===
| Overall | | | | | | | | Home | | | | | | Away | | | | | |
| Pld | W | D | L | GF | GA | GD | Pts | W | D | L | GF | GA | GD | W | D | L | GF | GA | GD |
|---|---|---|---|---|---|---|---|---|---|---|---|---|---|---|---|---|---|---|---|
| 46 | 15 | 7 | 24 | 43 | 68 | −25 | 52 | 10 | 3 | 10 | 27 | 30 | −3 | 5 | 4 | 14 | 16 | 38 | −22 |

Last updated: 6 May 2011.
Source: BBC Sport

=== Results by round ===
| Round | 1 | 2 | 3 | 4 | 5 | 6 | 7 | 8 | 9 | 10 | 11 | 12 | 13 | 14 | 15 | 16 | 17 | 18 | 19 | 20 | 21 | 22 | 23 | 24 | 25 | 26 | 27 | 28 | 29 | 30 | 31 | 32 | 33 | 34 | 35 | 36 | 37 | 38 | 39 | 40 | 41 | 42 | 43 | 44 | 45 | 46 |
|---|---|---|---|---|---|---|---|---|---|---|---|---|---|---|---|---|---|---|---|---|---|---|---|---|---|---|---|---|---|---|---|---|---|---|---|---|---|---|---|---|---|---|---|---|---|---|
| Ground | A | H | A | H | H | A | H | A | A | H | A | H | A | H | A | A | H | H | H | A | A | H | H | A | A | A | A | H | H | A | H | H | A | H | A | H | H | A | A | H | A | H | A | H | A | H |
| Result | L | W | L | L | L | D | W | L | D | L | W | W | L | W | W | L | L | D | W | L | W | W | L | L | L | L | D | L | W | L | L | W | L | W | W | D | L | L | W | L | L | D | L | W | D | L |
| Position | | | 16 | 17 | 22 | 22 | 19 | 22 | 21 | 23 | 21 | 19 | 20 | 16 | 10 | 13 | 14 | 15 | 14 | 16 | 11 | 10 | 11 | 14 | 14 | 18 | 17 | 18 | 17 | 18 | 21 | 20 | 20 | 20 | 17 | 17 | 18 | 20 | 15 | 18 | 18 | 16 | 19 | 18 | 16 | 18 |

Updated to match(es) played on 15 May 2011. Source: Fixtures & Results
A = Away; H = Home; W = Win; D = Draw; L = Loss

== Appearances and goals ==
As of 6 May 2011.
(Substitute appearances in brackets)

| No. | Pos. | Name | League | | FA Cup | | League Cup | | League Trophy | | Total | | Discipline | |
| No. | Pos. | Name | Apps | Goals | Apps | Goals | Apps | Goals | Apps | Goals | Apps | Goals | Yellow card | Red card |
|---|---|---|---|---|---|---|---|---|---|---|---|---|---|---|
| 1 | GK | Jon McLaughlin | 25 | 0 | 0 | 0 | 2 | 0 | 1 | 0 | 28 | 0 | 1 | 0 |
| 2 | DF | Simon Ramsden | 2 | 0 | 0 | 0 | 0 (1) | 0 | 0 | 0 | 2 (1) | 0 | 0 | 0 |
| 3 | DF | Luke O'Brien | 37 (5) | 0 | 2 | 0 | 1 | 0 | 1 | 0 | 41 (5) | 0 | 4 | 0 |
| 4 | MF | Michael Flynn | 16 (3) | 0 | 0 | 0 | 0 | 0 | 0 (1) | 0 | 16 (4) | 0 | 2 | 0 |
| 5 | DF | Zesh Rehman | 5 (3) | 0 | 1 | 0 | 2 | 0 | 1 | 0 | 9 (3) | 0 | 2 | 0 |
| 6 | DF | Luke Oliver | 41 (1) | 1 | 1 | 0 | 1 | 0 | 1 | 0 | 44 (1) | 1 | 4 | 0 |
| 7 | MF | Omar Daley | 22 (4) | 5 | 0 | 0 | 2 | 0 | 1 | 0 | 25 (4) | 5 | 4 | 0 |
| 8 | MF | Tommy Doherty | 17 (1) | 0 | 1 | 0 | 2 | 0 | 0 | 0 | 20 (1) | 0 | 2 | 1 |
| 9 | FW | Gareth Evans | 28 (8) | 3 | 0 (1) | 0 | 1 | 0 | 0 | 0 | 29 (9) | 3 | 6 | 0 |
| 10 | FW | Jake Speight | 13 (15) | 4 | 0 | 0 | 1 (1) | 1 | 0 (1) | 0 | 14 (17) | 5 | 3 | 0 |
| 11 | MF | Scott Neilson | 1 | 0 | 0 | 0 | 1 | 0 | 0 | 0 | 2 | 0 | 0 | 0 |
| 11 | MF | Lee Hendrie | 8 (4) | 2 | 1 | 0 | 0 | 0 | 1 | 0 | 10 (4) | 2 | 2 | 0 |
| 11 | FW | Scott Dobie | 8 (5) | 0 | 0 | 0 | 0 | 0 | 0 | 0 | 8 (5) | 0 | 0 | 0 |
| 12 | DF | Steve Williams | 26 (2) | 3 | 1 | 0 | 2 | 0 | 1 | 0 | 30 (2) | 3 | 1 | 0 |
| 14 | MF | Leon Osborne | 10 (12) | 1 | 0 | 0 | 0 | 0 | 0 | 0 | 10 (12) | 1 | 1 | 0 |
| 15 | DF | Lewis Hunt | 24 | 1 | 0 | 0 | 0 | 0 | 0 | 0 | 24 | 1 | 6 | 0 |
| 16 | MF | Shane Duff | 14 | 1 | 0 | 0 | 1 | 0 | 0 | 0 | 15 | 1 | 1 | 0 |
| 17 | FW | James Hanson | 31 (5) | 6 | 1 | 2 | 0 (2) | 1 | 0 | 0 | 32 (7) | 9 | 2 | 0 |
| 18 | MF | Luke Dean | 0 (1) | 0 | 0 | 0 | 0 | 0 | 0 | 0 | 0 (1) | 0 | 0 | 0 |
| 19 | FW | Louis Moult | 4 (7) | 1 | 1 | 0 | 2 | 0 | 1 | 0 | 8 (7) | 1 | 2 | 0 |
| 19 | MF | Jon Worthington | 16 | 0 | 0 | 0 | 0 | 0 | 0 | 0 | 16 | 0 | 2 | 1 |
| 20 | MF | Tom Adeyemi | 30 (4) | 5 | 1 | 0 | 1 | 0 | 1 | 0 | 33 (4) | 5 | 1 | 0 |
| 22 | MF | Lee Bullock | 22 (4) | 0 | 0 | 0 | 1 | 0 | 1 | 0 | 24 (4) | 0 | 6 | 0 |
| 23 | FW | Dave Syers | 30 (7) | 8 | 1 | 1 | 1 (1) | 1 | 0 | 0 | 32 (8) | 10 | 7 | 0 |
| 25 | FW | Chib Chilaka | 0 (4) | 0 | 0 (1) | 0 | 0 (1) | 0 | 0 | 0 | 0 (6) | 0 | 1 | 0 |
| 26 | DF | Oliver Gill | 3 | 0 | 0 | 0 | 0 | 0 | 0 | 0 | 3 | 0 | 1 | 0 |
| 26 | DF | Rob Kiernan | 6 (2) | 0 | 0 | 0 | 0 | 0 | 0 | 0 | 6 (2) | 0 | 0 | 0 |
| 26 | MF | Kevin Ellison | 6 (1) | 1 | 0 | 0 | 0 | 0 | 0 | 0 | 6 (1) | 1 | 2 | 0 |
| 28 | DF | Robbie Threlfall | 16 (4) | 0 | 0 | 0 | 0 | 0 | 0 | 0 | 16 (4) | 0 | 2 | 1 |
| 29 | DF | Reece Brown | 4 | 0 | 0 | 0 | 0 | 0 | 1 | 0 | 5 | 0 | 0 | 0 |
| 29 | DF | Richard Eckersley | 12 | 0 | 0 | 0 | 0 | 0 | 0 | 0 | 12 | 0 | 0 | 0 |
| 29 | FW | Darren Stephenson | 0 (1) | 0 | 0 | 0 | 0 | 0 | 0 | 0 | 0 (1) | 0 | 0 | 0 |
| 30 | FW | Jason Price | 6 (4) | 1 | 1 | 0 | 0 | 0 | 0 | 0 | 7 (4) | 1 | 0 | 0 |
| 30 | FW | Mark Cullen | 1 (3) | 0 | 0 | 0 | 0 | 0 | 0 | 0 | 1 (3) | 0 | 0 | 0 |
| 31 | MF | Alex Flett | 0 (1) | 0 | 0 | 0 | 0 | 0 | 0 | 0 | 0 (1) | 0 | 0 | 0 |
| 32 | MF | Dominic Rowe | 1 (1) | 0 | 0 | 0 | 0 | 0 | 0 | 0 | 1 (1) | 0 | 0 | 0 |
| 40 | GK | Lenny Pidgeley | 21 | 0 | 1 | 0 | 0 | 0 | 0 | 0 | 22 | 0 | 1 | 0 |

=== Top scorers ===
| Place | Position | Number | Name | League Two | FA Cup | League Cup | FL Trophy | Total | |
|---|---|---|---|---|---|---|---|---|---|
| 1 | MF | 23 | Dave Syers | 8 | 1 | 1 | 0 | 10 | |
| 2 | FW | 17 | James Hanson | 6 | 2 | 1 | 0 | 9 | |
| 3 | MF | 20 | Tom Adeyemi | 5 | 0 | 0 | 0 | 5 | |
| = | MF | 7 | Omar Daley | 5 | 0 | 0 | 0 | 5 | |
| = | FW | 10 | Jake Speight | 4 | 0 | 1 | 0 | 5 | |
| 4 | FW | 9 | Gareth Evans | 3 | 0 | 0 | 0 | 3 | |
| = | DF | 12 | Steve Williams | 3 | 0 | 0 | 0 | 3 | |
| 5 | MF | 11 | Lee Hendrie | 2 | 0 | 0 | 0 | 2 | |
| 6 | FW | 14 | Leon Osborne | 1 | 0 | 0 | 0 | 1 | |
| = | FW | 19 | Louis Moult | 1 | 0 | 0 | 0 | 1 | |
| = | FW | 30 | Jason Price | 1 | 0 | 0 | 0 | 1 | |
| = | DF | 6 | Luke Oliver | 1 | 0 | 0 | 0 | 1 | |
| = | DF | 16 | Shane Duff | 1 | 0 | 0 | 0 | 1 | |
| = | MF | 26 | Kevin Ellison | 1 | 0 | 0 | 0 | 1 | |
| = | DF | 15 | Lewis Hunt | 1 | 0 | 0 | 0 | 1 | |
| 7 | – | – | – | Own Goals | 0 | 0 | 0 | 0 | 0 |
| | | | | Totals | 43 | 3 | 3 | 0 | 49 |

== Transfers ==
Players transferred in
| Date | Pos. | Name | From | Fee | Ref. |
|---|---|---|---|---|---|
| 27 May 2010 | DF | Luke Oliver | Wycombe Wanderers | Free | |
| 27 May 2010 | DF | Robbie Threlfall | Liverpool | Free | |
| 27 May 2010 | GK | Lloyd Saxton | Plymouth Argyle | Free | |
| 28 May 2010 | MF | Tommy Doherty | Ferencváros | Free | |
| 30 June 2010 | FW | Jake Speight | Mansfield Town | £25,000 | |
| 2 July 2010 | DF | Shane Duff | Cheltenham Town | Free (Bosman) | |
| 30 July 2010 | DF | Lewis Hunt | Wycombe Wanderers | Free | |
| 9 August 2010 | FW | Dave Syers | Guiseley | Free | |
| 31 August 2010 | FW | Chib Chilaka | Leeds Carnegie | Free | |
| 17 September 2010 | MF | Lee Hendrie | Derby County | Free | |
| 29 October 2010 | GK | Lenny Pidgeley | Woking | Free | |
| 27 January 2011 | MF | Jon Worthington | Oldham Athletic | Free | |
Players loaned in
| Date from | Pos. | Name | From | Date to | Ref. |
| 14 July 2010 | MF | Tom Adeyemi | Norwich City | End of season | |
| 30 July 2010 | FW | Louis Moult | Stoke City | 3 January 2011 | |
| 29 September 2010 | DF | Oliver Gill | Manchester United | 25 October 2010 | |
| 29 September 2010 | DF | Reece Brown | Manchester United | 25 October 2010 | |
| 13 October 2010 | FW | Jason Price | Carlisle United | 3 January 2011 | |
| 12 November 2010 | DF | Rob Kiernan | Watford | 5 January 2011 | |
| 12 November 2010 | DF | Richard Eckersley | Burnley | 6 February 2011 | |
| 6 January 2011 | FW | Mark Cullen | Hull City | 6 February 2011 | |
| 25 January 2011 | MF | Jon Worthington | Oldham Athletic | 27 January 2011 | |
| 31 January 2011 | FW | Scott Dobie | St Johnstone | End of season | |
| 10 February 2011 | MF | Kevin Ellison | Rotherham United | 3 May 2011 | |
Players loaned out
| Date from | Pos. | Name | To | Date to | Ref. |
| 17 September 2010 | GK | Chris Elliott | Harrogate Railway Athletic | 17 October 2010 | |
| 25 September 2010 | MF | Ryan Harrison | Harrogate Railway Athletic | 25 October 2010 | |
| 21 October 2010 | DF | Louis Horne | Fleetwood Town | 26 November 2010 | |
| 29 October 2010 | FW | Jake Speight | Port Vale | 4 January 2011 | |
| 12 November 2010 | FW | Chib Chilaka | Bradford Park Avenue | 12 December 2010 | |
| 26 November 2010 | DF | Louis Horne | FC Halifax Town | 27 December 2010 | |
| 10 February 2011 | MF | Omar Daley | Rotherham United | 18 April 2011 | |
| 18 February 2011 | FW | Chib Chilaka | Harrogate Town | 28 March 2011 | |
| 18 February 2011 | GK | Chris Elliott | Harrogate Town | 18 March 2011 | |
| 8 March 2011 | FW | Oliver Forsyth | Harrogate Town | 8 April 2011 | |
Players transferred out
| Date | Pos. | Name | Subsequent club | Fee | Ref. |
| 16 August 2010 | MF | Scott Neilson | Crawley Town | £15,000 | |
Players released
| Date | Pos. | Name | Subsequent club | Date to | Ref. |
| 1 July 2010 | DF | Matt Convey | Thackley | ? | |
| 1 July 2010 | DF | Matt Clarke | Hibernians | 2 July 2010 | |
| 1 July 2010 | MF | Luke Sharry | Guiseley | 31 July 2010 | |
| 1 July 2010 | DF | Jonathan Bateson | Accrington Stanley | 3 August 2010 | |
| 1 July 2010 | MF | Rory Carson | Ballymena United | 13 August 2010 | |
| 1 July 2010 | MF | Stephen O'Leary | Kettering Town | 14 August 2010 | |
| 1 July 2010 | GK | Matt Glennon | Stockport County | 3 September 2010 | |
| 26 July 2010 | DF | Jamie O'Brien | St. Patrick's Athletic | 27 July 2010 | |
| 20 December 2010 | DF | Zesh Rehman | Muangthong United | 20 December 2010 | |
| 31 December 2010 | MF | Lee Hendrie | Bandung | 27 January 2011 | |
| 4 May 2011 | MF | Tommy Doherty | Newport County | 11 June 2011 | |

== See also ==
- 2010–11 in English football
- 2010–11 Football League
