= 2010–11 Huddersfield Town A.F.C. season =

Huddersfield Town
2010–11 season
- Chairman: Dean Hoyle
- Manager: Lee Clark
- Football League One: 3rd
- Play-offs: Runners-Up (eliminated by Peterborough United)
- FA Cup: Fourth round (eliminated by Arsenal)
- League Cup: Second round (eliminated by Everton)
- League Trophy: Area Final (eliminated by Carlisle United)
- Top goalscorer: League: Jordan Rhodes (16); All: Jordan Rhodes (22)
- Highest home attendance: 17,024 vs. Sheffield Wednesday (3 January 2011)
- Lowest home attendance: 2,904 vs. Peterborough United (5 October 2010)
- Biggest win: 6–0 vs Macclesfield Town (27 November 2010)
- Biggest defeat: 1–5 vs Everton (25 August 2010); 0–4 vs Carlisle United (18 January 2011)
Home colours	Away colours

The 2010–11 season was Huddersfield Town's seventh consecutive season in the third tier of English football. After losing to Millwall in the play-offs in the previous season, many hoped that Huddersfield would gain promotion to the Football League Championship. After finishing in third place with a club record of 87 points, Huddersfield lost the play-off final at Old Trafford, by 3–0 against Peterborough United, meaning that they would stay in League One for another season.

== Squad at the start of the season ==
Note: Flags indicate national team as defined under FIFA eligibility rules; some limited exceptions apply. Players may hold more than one non-FIFA nationality.

No.	Pos.	Nation	Player
1	GK	ENG	Alex Smithies
2	DF	ENG	Lee Peltier
3	DF	SCO	Gary Naysmith
4	MF	ISL	Joey Guðjónsson
5	DF	ENG	Peter Clarke (Captain)
6	DF	ENG	Nathan Clarke
7	MF	ENG	Gary Roberts
8	MF	ENG	Antony Kay
9	FW	JAM	Theo Robinson
10	FW	ENG	Joe Garner (on loan from Nottingham Forest)
11	MF	IRL	Anthony Pilkington
12	DF	ENG	Tom Clarke
13	GK	ENG	Ian Bennett
14	MF	NIR	Damien Johnson (on loan from Plymouth Argyle)
15	FW	ENG	Robbie Simpson

No.	Pos.	Nation	Player
16	MF	SCO	Scott Arfield
17	FW	SCO	Jordan Rhodes
18	DF	ENG	Jamie McCombe
19	FW	IRL	Alan Lee
21	FW	ENG	Lee Novak
22	MF	ENG	Lee Croft (on loan from Derby County)
25	MF	IRL	Jim Goodwin
29	DF	ENG	Liam Ridehalgh
30	FW	ENG	Jimmy Spencer (on loan at Morecambe)
31	MF	ENG	Chris Atkinson
32	DF	ENG	Jack Hunt (on loan at Chesterfield)
33	DF	ENG	Leigh Franks (on loan at Oxford United)
34	MF	ENG	Aidan Chippendale
36	MF	IRL	Graham Carey (on loan from Celtic)

== Review ==
After the near miss in the play-offs, many think that Huddersfield Town would be one of the favourites for promotion that season. Just a week after the defeat to Millwall, manager Lee Clark made his first signing of the season, buying the Scotland U-21 midfielder Scott Arfield for an undisclosed fee from the recently relegated Scottish Premier League side Falkirk. On the same day, Clark released Dean Heffernan (who returned to Australia to honour his contract with Melbourne Heart), Robbie Williams (who later joined Stockport County), Lewis Nightingale, Taser Hassan and Phil Jevons (who joined Morecambe on a permanent basis on 3 July).

On 2 June, the Icelandic international Joey Guðjónsson signed a 2-year contract from the recently relegated Premier League side Burnley. Two days later, the Scottish international left-back Gary Naysmith signed for Huddersfield after rejecting a new contract at Sheffield United. On the same day, goalkeeper Simon Eastwood left the club to join the newly promoted Football League Two side Oxford United. On 17 June, the goalkeeper Ian Bennett was signed on a free transfer from Sheffield United. On 22 June, the striker Tom Denton left the club by mutual consent. On the following day, the defender Andy Butler also had his contract paid up and left the club. On 29 June, the left-back Joe Skarz signed for the Football League Two side Bury for an undisclosed fee. The next day, the winger Lee Croft joined Huddersfield on a 6-month loan deal from Derby County. He returned to Derby on 3 January 2011. On 1 July, the defender Jamie McCombe, whose brother John, played for Huddersfield in the not too distant past, joined the Huddersfield for an undisclosed fee from Bristol City. The following day, after failing to reach a new deal, Krystian Pearce left the club after playing for just 45 minutes. He eventually joined Notts County. On 6 July, the midfielder James Berrett left the club to join the League One side Carlisle United on a free transfer. Later that day, the midfielder Michael Collins joined Football League Championship side Scunthorpe United for an undisclosed fee. On 14 July, the young Irish winger Graham Carey signed on a 6-month loan from the Scottish Premier League runners-up Celtic. He returned to Celtic on 13 January 2011, after Huddersfield failed to agree terms on an extension to his deal. On 21 July, the striker Joe Garner signed on a 6-month loan from Nottingham Forest. He returned there on 4 January 2011. On 28 July, two of Huddersfield's youngsters, Jack Hunt and Leigh Franks, were sent out on 6-month loans to Chesterfield and Oxford United respectively. On 5 August, the midfielder Damien Johnson was signed on a season-long loan from the League One rivals Plymouth Argyle. The following day, the striker Robbie Simpson joined Brentford on a season-long loan. On 25 August, the striker Alan Lee joined the club for an undisclosed fee from Crystal Palace. On 31 August, Jim Goodwin left the club by mutual consent. He joined the Scottish Premier League side Hamilton Academical on 6 September. On 8 September, Theo Robinson joined the Championship side Millwall on an emergency 3-month loan deal, but he returned in November, after an injury. He rejoined the club on a permanent deal on 13 January, for an undisclosed fee. On 15 October, Huddersfield brought in the experienced goalkeeper Nick Colgan on a one-month loan from the Conference National side Grimsby Town. He returned a month later, after making no appearances. On 21 January 2011, he signed for Huddersfield on a permanent deal, after being released by Grimsby. On 1 January 2011, as the transfer window reopened, Huddersfield signed the experienced Ireland international Kevin Kilbane on loan from Hull City for the rest of the season. On 10 January, Huddersfield signed Newcastle United's Hungarian international defender Tamás Kádár on loan. On 27 January, the Huddersfield stalwart Nathan Clarke joined the League One rivals Colchester United on loan. On 31 January, as the transfer window was about to shut, Danny Cadamarteri returned to Huddersfield on a short-term contract following his release by the Scottish Premier League side Dundee United. On 26 February, Huddersfield signed the left-back Stephen Jordan on an emergency one-month loan from Sheffield United, following injuries to Gary Naysmith and Liam Ridehalgh. On 15 March, a week after the injury that curtailed Anthony Pilkington's involvement in the season, Huddersfield increased its attacking options by bringing in the winger Danny Ward on loan from the Premier League side Bolton Wanderers for the rest of the season. Defensive options were bolstered by signing the centre-back Sean Morrison on loan from Reading on 23 March. Just as the transfer window shut, the young midfielder Aidan Chippendale was sent on loan to the Conference National side York City

On 16 June, Huddersfield was drawn away to Carlisle United in the first round of the Carling Cup. The following day, the new fixtures were released, with Huddersfield's first league game being against the Football League Two champions Notts County on 7 August.

== Squad at the end of the season ==
Note: Flags indicate national team as defined under FIFA eligibility rules; some limited exceptions apply. Players may hold more than one non-FIFA nationality.

No.	Pos.	Nation	Player
1	GK	ENG	Alex Smithies
2	DF	ENG	Lee Peltier
3	DF	SCO	Gary Naysmith
4	MF	ISL	Joey Guðjónsson
5	DF	ENG	Peter Clarke (Captain)
6	DF	ENG	Nathan Clarke (on loan at Colchester United)
7	MF	ENG	Gary Roberts
8	MF	ENG	Antony Kay
9	FW	ENG	Danny Cadamarteri
10	FW	ENG	Danny Ward (on loan from Bolton Wanderers)
11	MF	IRL	Anthony Pilkington
12	DF	ENG	Tom Clarke
13	GK	ENG	Ian Bennett
14	MF	NIR	Damien Johnson (on loan from Plymouth Argyle)
15	FW	ENG	Robbie Simpson
16	MF	SCO	Scott Arfield
17	FW	SCO	Jordan Rhodes

No.	Pos.	Nation	Player
18	DF	ENG	Jamie McCombe
19	FW	IRL	Alan Lee
20	MF	IRL	Kevin Kilbane (on loan from Hull City)
21	FW	ENG	Lee Novak
24	FW	ENG	Benik Afobe (on loan from Arsenal)
25	GK	IRL	Nick Colgan
26	GK	ENG	Lloyd Allinson
29	DF	ENG	Liam Ridehalgh
30	FW	ENG	Jimmy Spencer (on loan at Morecambe)
31	MF	ENG	Chris Atkinson
32	DF	ENG	Jack Hunt
33	DF	ENG	Leigh Franks
34	MF	ENG	Aidan Chippendale
37	MF	ENG	Matt Crooks
38	MF	ENG	Greg Pearson
40	FW	GAM	Hatib Cham

== Transfers ==
=== In ===
Date	Pos.	Name	From	Fee
24 May	MF	(Scotland) Scott Arfield	(Scotland) Falkirk	Undisclosed Fee
2 June	MF	(Iceland) Joey Guðjónsson	(England) Burnley	Free
4 June	DF	(Scotland) Gary Naysmith	(England) Sheffield United	Free
17 June	GK	(England) Ian Bennett	(England) Sheffield United	Free
1 July	DF	(England) Jamie McCombe	(England) Bristol City	Undisclosed
25 August	FW	(Republic of Ireland) Alan Lee	(England) Crystal Palace	Undisclosed
21 January	GK	(Republic of Ireland) Nick Colgan	(England) Grimsby Town	Free
31 January	FW	(England) Danny Cadamarteri	(Scotland) Dundee United	Free

=== Loans in ===
Date	Pos.	Name	From	Expiry
30 June	MF	(England) Lee Croft	(England) Derby County	January 2011
14 July	MF	(Republic of Ireland) Graham Carey	(Scotland) Celtic	January 2011
21 July	FW	(England) Joe Garner	(England) Nottingham Forest	January 2011
5 August	MF	(Northern Ireland) Damien Johnson	(England) Plymouth Argyle	June 2011
15 October	GK	(Republic of Ireland) Nick Colgan	(England) Grimsby Town	November 2010
2 November	FW	(England) Benik Afobe	(England) Arsenal	December 2010
1 January	MF	(Republic of Ireland) Kevin Kilbane	(England) Hull City	May 2011
10 January	DF	(Hungary) Tamás Kádár	(England) Newcastle United	February 2011
13 January	DF	(England) Jack Hunt	(England) Chesterfield	Loan Ended
26 February	DF	(England) Stephen Jordan	(England) Sheffield United	March 2011
15 March	MF	(England) Danny Ward	(England) Bolton Wanderers	End Of Season
23 March	DF	(Republic of Ireland) Sean Morrison	(England) Reading	End Of Season
19 April	MF	(England) Aidan Chippendale	(England) York City	Recalled

=== Out ===
Date	Pos.	Name	To	Fee
24 May	DF	(Australia) Dean Heffernan	(Australia) Melbourne Heart	Pre-signed agreement
24 May	MF	(England) Taser Hassan	N/A	Released
24 May	MF	(England) Lewis Nightingale	(England) Bradford Park Avenue	Released
4 June	GK	(England) Simon Eastwood	(England) Oxford United	Free
22 June	FW	(England) Tom Denton	(England) Wakefield	Free
29 June	DF	(England) Joe Skarz	(England) Bury	Undisclosed
3 July	FW	(England) Phil Jevons	(England) Morecambe	Free
6 July	MF	(Republic of Ireland) James Berrett	(England) Carlisle United	Undisclosed
6 June	MF	(Republic of Ireland) Michael Collins	(England) Scunthorpe United	Undisclosed
26 July	DF	(England) Krystian Pearce	(England) Notts County	Free
2 August	MF	(England) Lionel Ainsworth	(England) Shrewsbury Town	Undisclosed
6 August	DF	(England) Robbie Williams	(England) Stockport County	Free
6 September	MF	(Republic of Ireland) Jim Goodwin	(Scotland) Hamilton Academical	Free
12 November	DF	(England) Andy Butler	(England) Walsall	Free
13 January	FW	(Jamaica) Theo Robinson	(England) Millwall	Undisclosed Fee

=== Loans out ===
Date	Pos.	Name	To	Expiry
13 July	FW	(England) Jimmy Spencer	(England) Morecambe	January 2011
28 July	DF	(England) Leigh Franks	(England) Oxford United	January 2011
28 July	DF	(England) Jack Hunt	(England) Chesterfield	January 2011
6 August	FW	(England) Robbie Simpson	(England) Brentford	June 2011
8 September	FW	(Jamaica) Theo Robinson	(England) Millwall	December 2010
15 November	GK	(Republic of Ireland) Nick Colgan	(England) Grimsby Town	Loan Ended
3 January	MF	(England) Lee Croft	(England) Derby County	Loan Ended
3 January	FW	(England) Joe Garner	(England) Nottingham Forest	Loan Ended
13 January	MF	(Republic of Ireland) Graham Carey	(Scotland) Celtic	Loan Ended
27 January	DF	(England) Nathan Clarke	(England) Colchester United	May 2011
22 March	DF	(England) Stephen Jordan	(England) Sheffield United	Loan Ended
25 March	MF	(England) Aidan Chippendale	(England) York City	May 2011
19 April	DF	(Republic of Ireland) Sean Morrison	(England) Reading	Recalled

== Final league table ==
Pos	Team	Pld	W	D	L	GF	GA	GD	Pts	Promotion, qualification or relegation
1	Brighton & Hove Albion (C, P)	46	28	11	7	85	40	+45	95	Promotion to Football League Championship
2	Southampton (P)	46	28	8	10	86	38	+48	92	Promotion to Football League Championship
3	Huddersfield Town	46	25	12	9	77	48	+29	87	Qualification for League One play-offs
4	Peterborough United (O, P)	46	23	10	13	106	75	+31	79	Qualification for League One play-offs
5	Milton Keynes Dons	46	23	8	15	67	60	+7	77	Qualification for League One play-offs

Updated to match(es) played on 2 May 2011. Source: BBC
Rules for classification: 1) points; 2) goal difference; 3) number of goals scored.
(C) Champions; (O) Play-off winners; (P) Promoted

== Results ==
=== Pre-season ===
Date	Competition	Opponents	Home/ Away	Result F – A	Scorers	Attendance
9 July 2010	Pre-season Friendly	A.F.C. Emley	A	5–0	Simpson [24], Roberts [44], Ainsworth [53], Rhodes [67, 70]	1,500
14 July 2010	Pre-season Friendly	Bradford Park Avenue	A	3–0	Rhodes [2], Arfield [58 (pen)], Robinson [80]	522
15 July 2010	Pre-season Friendly	Frickley Athletic	A	0–1		412
17 July 2010	Pre-season Friendly	Bury	A	1–1	Carey [11]	1,704
21 July 2010	Pre-season Friendly	Blackburn Rovers	H	1–0	Guðjónsson [17]	6,651
24 July 2010	Pre-season Friendly	Barnsley	A	1–3	Robinson [84]	4,478
31 July 2010	Pre-season Friendly	Scunthorpe United	A	0–2		1,484
4 August 2010	Pre-season Friendly	Fleetwood Town	A	0–1		526

=== League One ===
Date	Opponents	Home/ Away	Result F – A	Scorers	Attendance	Position
7 August 2010	Notts County	A	3–0	Pilkington [32, 72], Rhodes [35]	10,342	1st
14 August 2010	Tranmere Rovers	H	0–0		13,707	3rd
21 August 2010	Peterborough United	A	2–4	Rhodes [22], Carey [33]	6,647	10th
28 August 2010	Charlton Athletic	H	3–1	Rhodes [39], McCombe [42], Roberts [82]	13,858	6th
4 September 2010	A.F.C. Bournemouth	H	2–2	Kay [45], Roberts [48 (pen)]	12,426	8th
11 September 2010	Leyton Orient	A	2–1	Arfield [3], Rhodes [78]	3,918	4th
18 September 2010	Yeovil Town	H	4–2	Arfield [49], McCombe [66, 68], Roberts [75 (pen)]	13,479	1st
25 September 2010	Swindon Town	A	0–1		8,652	4th
28 September 2010	Rochdale	A	0–3		6,121	8th
2 October 2010	Bristol Rovers	H	0–1		12,344	11th
9 October 2010	Colchester United	A	3–0	Novak [34], Pilkington [42], Rhodes [78]	4,211	6th
16 October 2010	Southampton	H	2–0	Pilkington [6], Guðjónsson [45]	14,769	5th
23 October 2010	Plymouth Argyle	A	1–2	Pilkington [19]	7,048	5th
30 October 2010	Walsall	H	1–0	Pilkington [35]	13,062	2nd
2 November 2010	Sheffield Wednesday	A	2–0	Carey [23], Pilkington [34]	20,540	2nd
13 November 2010	Oldham Athletic	A	0–1		7,723	5th
20 November 2010	Exeter City	H	0–1		13,108	9th
23 November 2010	Milton Keynes Dons	H	4–1	Kay [24], Roberts [36], Rhodes [47, 66]	12,773	5th
11 December 2010	Brighton & Hove Albion	H	2–1	Rhodes [56], McCombe [84]	14,398	3rd
26 December 2010	Hartlepool United	H	0–1		14,813	3rd
28 December 2010	Southampton	A	1–4	Novak [15]	24,483	3rd
1 January 2011	Carlisle United	A	2–2	P. Clarke [23], Arfield [63]	5,904	6th
3 January 2011	Sheffield Wednesday	H	1–0	Pilkington [27]	17,024	4th
11 January 2011	Plymouth Argyle	H	3–2	Árnason [18 (og)], Rhodes [29], P. Clarke [32]	11,462	4th
15 January 2011	Walsall	A	4–2	Kilbane [19], McCombe [25], P. Clarke [77], Rhodes [90]	3,827	2nd
22 January 2011	Colchester United	H	0–0		12,689	3rd
1 February 2011	Carlisle United	H	2–0	Roberts [39, 45]	11,572	3rd
5 February 2011	Exeter City	A	4–1	Cadamarteri [55], Roberts [67], Pilkington [81], Kilbane [88]	4,786	3rd
12 February 2011	Oldham Athletic	H	0–0		16,176	3rd
19 February 2011	A.F.C. Bournemouth	A	1–1	Cadamarteri [89]	7,923	3rd
22 February 2011	Dagenham & Redbridge	A	1–1	T. Clarke [28]	2,336	3rd
26 February 2011	Leyton Orient	H	2–2	Rhodes [3], Novak [49]	13,527	3rd
1 March 2011	Hartlepool United	A	1–0	Pilkington [12]	2,857	3rd
5 March 2011	Yeovil Town	A	1–1	Kay [58]	3,620	3rd
8 March 2011	Rochdale	H	2–1	Afobe [25], Roberts [33]	12,531	3rd
12 March 2011	Bristol Rovers	A	1–0	Rhodes [5]	7,380	2nd
15 March 2011	Brentford	A	1–0	P. Clarke [90]	4,402	2nd
19 March 2011	Swindon Town	H	0–0		13,907	2nd
27 March 2011	Notts County	H	3–0	Rhodes [36, 61], Roberts [58]	13,661	2nd
2 April 2011	Tranmere Rovers	A	2–0	Afobe [39], Novak [87]	6,438	2nd
9 April 2011	Peterborough United	H	1–1	Hunt [90]	16,431	3rd
16 April 2011	Charlton Athletic	A	1–0	Guðjónsson [83]	15,879	3rd
22 April 2011	Milton Keynes Dons	A	3–1	Arfield [23], Peltier [35], Cadamarteri [70]	11,857	2nd
25 April 2011	Dagenham & Redbridge	H	2–1	Rhodes [9, 32]	14,072	3rd
30 April 2011	Brighton & Hove Albion	A	3–2	Afobe [8, 61], Ward [90]	8,416	3rd
7 May 2011	Brentford	H	4–4	Ward [14, 15], Novak [52], Afobe [63]	13,977	3rd

=== Football League play-offs ===
14 May 2011 Semi-Final 1st Leg	AFC Bournemouth	1–1	Huddersfield Town	Bournemouth
12:45	McDermott 60'		Kilbane 22'	Stadium: Dean Court; Attendance: 9,043; Referee: Mick Russell

18 May 2011 Semi-Final 2nd Leg	Huddersfield Town	3–3 (a.e.t.) (4–4 agg.) (4–2 p)	AFC Bournemouth	Huddersfield
19:45	Naysmith (yellow card) 14'; Peltier 26'; Clarke (yellow card) 43'; Ward 45+2'; Kilbane (yellow card) 60'; Kay 105+2'; Hunt (yellow card) 108'		Lovell 44' (pen.), 63' (yellow card) 90'; McDermott (yellow card) 54'; Smith (yellow card) 98'; Ings 104' (yellow card) 105'; Pearce (red card) 112'	Stadium: Galpharm Stadium; Attendance: 16,444; Referee: Neil Swarbrick
	Penalties
	Novak (penalty scored); Ward (penalty scored); Kilbane (penalty scored); Kay (penalty scored)		(penalty scored) Michael Symes; (penalty missed) Feneey; (penalty missed) Robinson; (penalty scored) Cooper

29 May 2011 Final	Huddersfield Town	0–3	Peterborough United	Manchester
15:00	Peltier (yellow card) 34'; Hunt (yellow card) 39'; Kay (yellow card) 76'		Tomlin (yellow card) 29'; Lee (yellow card) 65'; Rowe 78'; Mackail-Smith 80'; McCann 85'	Stadium: Old Trafford; Attendance: 48,410; Referee: Steve Tanner

=== FA Cup ===
Date	Round	Opponents	Home/ Away	Result F – A	Scorers	Attendance
6 November 2010	Round 1	Cambridge United	A	0–0		3,127
16 November 2010	Round 1 Replay	Cambridge United	H	2–1	Peltier [90], Roberts [90]	3,766
27 November 2010	Round 2	Macclesfield Town	H	6–0	Rhodes [19], Pilkington [35], Afobe [45], McCombe [49], Kay [53], Roberts [73]	4,924
8 January 2011	Round 3	Dover Athletic	H	2–0	Arfield [7], Roberts [8]	7,894
30 January 2011	Round 4	Arsenal	A	1–2	Lee [66]	59,375

=== Football League Cup ===
Date	Round	Opponents	Home/ Away	Result F – A	Scorers	Attendance
10 August 2010	Round 1	Carlisle United	A	1–0	Rhodes [89]	3,475
25 August 2010	Round 2	Everton	A	1–5	Heitinga [40 (og)]	28,901

=== Football League Trophy ===
Date	Round	Opponents	Home/ Away	Result F – A	Scorers	Attendance
31 August 2010	Round 1 North East	Bye
5 October 2010	Round 2 North East	Peterborough United	H	3–2	Carey [6], Pilkington [12, 24]	2,904
9 November 2010	Quarter-Final North	Rotherham United	A	5–2	Rhodes [1, 23], Afobe [28, 72], Arfield [52]	2,185
14 December 2010	Semi-Final North	Tranmere Rovers	A	2–0	Rhodes [18, 67]	2,598
18 January 2011	Final North 1st Leg	Carlisle United	A	0–4		3,706
8 February 2011	Final North 2nd Leg	Carlisle United	H	3–0	Pilkington [30], Lee [70, 81]	6,528 Carlisle won 4–3 on aggregate.

== Appearances and goals ==
Squad No.	Name	Nationality	Position	League		FA Cup		League Cup		Football League Trophy		Play-offs		Total	
Squad No.	Name	Nationality	Position	Apps	Goals	Apps	Goals	Apps	Goals	Apps	Goals	Apps	Goals	Apps	Goals
1	Alex Smithies	England	GK	22	0	2	0	2	0	1	0	0	0	27	0
2	Lee Peltier	England	DF	38	1	5	1	2	0	5	0	3	1	53	3
3	Gary Naysmith	Scotland	DF	13 (1)	0	0	0	2	0	0	0	3	0	18 (1)	0
4	Joey Guðjónsson	Iceland	MF	29 (8)	2	2 (1)	0	2	0	4 (1)	0	1	0	38 (10)	2
5	Peter Clarke	England	DF	46	4	5	0	2	0	3	0	3	0	59	4
6	Nathan Clarke	England	DF	1	0	0	0	0	0	0	0	0	0	1	0
7	Gary Roberts	England	MF	34 (3)	10	4	3	2	0	2 (2)	0	3	0	45 (5)	13
8	Antony Kay	England	MF	21 (6)	3	4	1	0 (1)	0	5	0	3	1	33 (7)	5
9	Theo Robinson	England	FW	0 (1)	0	0	0	1	0	0	0	0	0	1 (1)	0
9	Danny Cadamarteri	England	FW	2 (9)	3	0	0	0	0	0 (1)	0	0 (2)	0	2 (12)	3
10	Joe Garner	England	FW	10 (6)	0	0	0	1	0	0 (2)	0	0	0	11 (8)	0
10	Danny Ward	England	MF	5 (2)	3	0	0	0	0	0	0	3	1	8 (2)	4
11	Anthony Pilkington	Republic of Ireland	MF	30 (1)	10	4	1	1	0	4	3	0	0	39 (1)	14
12	Tom Clarke	England	DF	3 (2)	1	1 (1)	0	0	0	1	0	0	0	5 (3)	1
13	Ian Bennett	England	GK	24	0	3	0	0 (1)	0	3	0	3	0	33 (1)	0
14	Damien Johnson	Northern Ireland	MF	14 (2)	0	3	0	1 (1)	0	2	0	0	0	20 (3)	0
16	Scott Arfield	Scotland	MF	33 (7)	4	2 (3)	1	2	0	4	1	2	0	43 (10)	6
17	Jordan Rhodes	Scotland	FW	27 (10)	16	3 (1)	1	1	1	3 (1)	4	1 (1)	0	35 (13)	22
18	Jamie McCombe	England	DF	31 (3)	5	2 (2)	1	2	0	4	0	0 (1)	0	39 (6)	6
19	Alan Lee	Republic of Ireland	FW	17 (11)	0	2 (2)	1	0	0	3 (1)	2	0 (2)	0	22 (16)	3
20	Kevin Kilbane	Republic of Ireland	MF	23 (1)	2	2	0	0	0	2	0	3	1	30 (1)	3
21	Lee Novak	England	FW	12 (19)	5	1	0	0 (2)	0	2 (1)	0	0 (2)	0	15 (24)	5
22	Lee Croft	England	MF	0 (3)	0	0	0	1	0	0 (2)	0	0	0	1 (5)	0
22	Stephen Jordan	England	DF	6	0	0	0	0	0	0	0	0	0	6	0
24	Benik Afobe	England	FW	14 (14)	5	3	1	0	0	1	2	3	0	21 (14)	8
25	Nick Colgan	Republic of Ireland	GK	0	0	0	0	0	0	1	0	0	0	1	0
28	Tamás Kádár	Hungary	DF	2	0	0	0	0	0	0	0	0	0	2	0
29	Liam Ridehalgh	England	DF	15 (5)	0	3	0	0	0	3	0	0	0	21 (5)	0
31	Chris Atkinson	England	MF	2	0	0 (1)	0	0	0	0	0	0	0	2 (1)	0
32	Jack Hunt	England	DF	14 (5)	1	1	0	0	0	0	0	2 (1)	0	17 (6)	1
34	Aidan Chippendale	England	MF	0 (1)	0	0	0	0	0	0	0	0	0	0 (1)	0
36	Graham Carey	Republic of Ireland	MF	18 (1)	2	3 (1)	1	0 (1)	0	2	1	0	0	23 (3)	4
