= Chilaka =

Chilaka is a Telugu (Telugu: చిలక) and Igbo surname. Notable people with the surname include:

- Chibuzor Chilaka (born 1986), Nigerian footballer
- Rajiv Chilaka, Indian animator
