= Aidan Chippendale =

British footballer (born 1992)

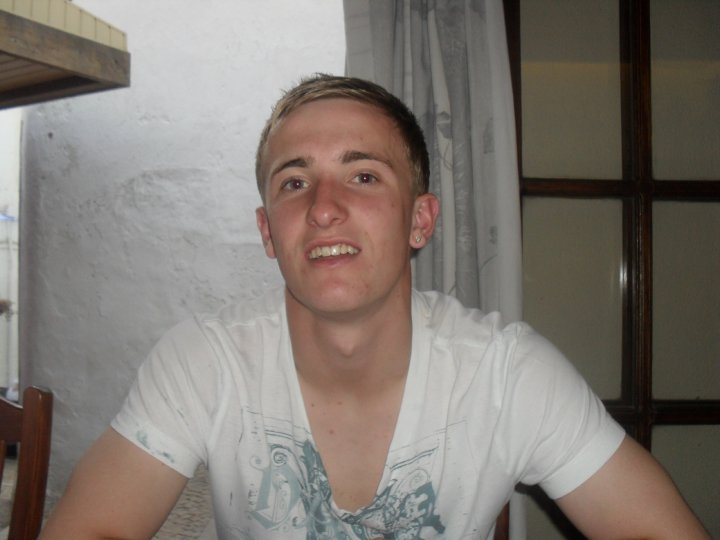
- Chippendale in 2010

Personal information
- Full name: Aidan Luke Chippendale
- Date of birth: 24 May 1992 (age 34)
- Place of birth: Bradford, England
- Height: 5 ft 8 in (1.73 m)
- Position: Winger

Team information
- Current team: Silsden

Youth career
- ?–2005: Bradford City
- 2005–2009: Huddersfield Town

Senior career*
Years	Team	Apps	(Gls)
2009–2012	Huddersfield Town	1	(0)
2011	→ York City (loan)	0	(0)
2011–2012	→ Inverness Caledonian Thistle (loan)	5	(0)
2012–2013	Accrington Stanley	6	(0)
2013	Bury	0	(0)
2013	→ Chester (loan)	7	(1)
2013–2014	Fylde	3	(0)
2014	Ashton United	3	(0)
2014–2017	Stalybridge Celtic	78	(12)
2017	Bradford Park Avenue	15	(0)
2017	FC United of Manchester	0	(0)
2017	Shaw Lane	0	(0)
2017	Stalybridge Celtic	11	(0)
2017–2018	Ossett Albion		
2018–2019	Ossett United	9	(0)
2019–2021	Colne	17	(1)
2020	→ Ossett United (loan)	1	(0)
2020	→ Bury (Note: Upon the merger of Bury F.C. and Bury A.F.C., the two team's histories were combined — retroactively counting A.F.C's seasons as seasons for Bury F.C.) (loan)	8	(3)
2021–2022	Bury	30	(11)
2022–2024	Thackley		
2024–	Silsden		
- * Club domestic league appearances and goals as of 22:35, 3 May 2022 (UTC)

Aidan Luke Chippendale (born 24 May 1992) is an English footballer who plays as a winger for Silsden.

== Career ==
=== Bradford City and Huddersfield Town ===
Born in Bradford, West Yorkshire, Chippendale played for hometown club Bradford City in their youth system before being released at the age of 13 when he joined Huddersfield Town. He was promoted to the first team squad for a game against Colchester United on 3 October 2009. He was named Huddersfield's Academy Player of the Year for the 2009–10 season and graduated from the club's academy in April 2010 after being offered a two-year professional contract. He made his debut for Huddersfield as a substitute in a 1–0 win over Bristol Rovers at the Memorial Stadium on 12 March 2011.

==== York City (loan) ====
On 25 March 2011, he joined Conference Premier club York City on loan until 30 April. After not being involved in any matches during his first month at the club, Huddersfield manager Lee Clark recalled Chippendale from his loan on 19 April 2011.

==== Inverness Caledonian Thistle (loan) ====
On 31 August 2011, Chippendale joined Scottish Premier League side Inverness Caledonian Thistle on loan until January 2012. He made his debut for Inverness on 10 September 2011 as an 81st-minute substitute against Hearts at the Caledonian Stadium in a 1–1 draw. He returned to Huddersfield on 9 January after his loan expired.

He left Huddersfield club in June 2012, after not being offered a new contract by manager Simon Grayson.

=== Accrington Stanley ===
Chippendale signed a one-year contract with League Two side Accrington Stanley after a successful trial on 25 July 2012. He made his debut for Accrington in a League Cup fixture on 11 August 2012 against Carlisle United in a 1–0 loss at Brunton Park. Chippendale was released by Accrington Stanley in May 2013 after struggling to make an impact and only starting four games for the club.

=== Bury F.C. ===
On 23 July 2013, Chippendale signed a one-year contract with League Two side Bury F.C. after a successful trial. On 5 November 2013, Bury F.C. confirmed that Chippendale's contract had been cancelled by mutual consent.

==== Chester (loan) ====
On 23 August 2013, Chippendale signed on loan for a month at Chester.

=== Fylde and Ashton United ===
Following his departure from Bury, Chippendale signed for Fylde in December 2013 Then joining Ashton United for the remaining of the 2013–14 season.

=== Stalybridge Celtic ===
In July 2014 he joined Stalybridge Celtic.

=== Bradford Park Avenue ===
In January 2017 he joined Bradford Park Avenue.

=== FC United of Manchester ===
In July 2017 he joined FC United of Manchester but left the club later that month without playing a competitive match.

=== Shaw Lane ===
He then joined Shaw Lane.

=== Stalybridge Celtic (second spell) ===
He rejoined Stalybridge on 1 September 2017.

=== Ossett Albion and Ossett United ===
He joined Ossett Albion before then moving to Ossett's new team Ossett United in the summer of 2018.

=== Colne FC & Bury AFC ===
Chippendale joined Colne F.C. in the summer 2019. In March 2020, he was loaned out to Ossett United until the end of the season.

On 26 September 2020, Chippendale joined Bury AFC for the rest of 2020. He returned to Bury in July 2021.

== Career statistics ==
As of match played 18 January 2017.

Appearances and goals by club, season and competition
Club	Season	League			FA Cup		League Cup		Other		Total	
Club	Season	Division	Apps	Goals	Apps	Goals	Apps	Goals	Apps	Goals	Apps	Goals
Huddersfield Town	2009–10	League One	0	0	0	0	0	0	0	0	0	0
Huddersfield Town	2010–11	League One	1	0	0	0	0	0	0	0	1	0
Huddersfield Town	2011–12	League One	0	0	0	0	0	0	0	0	0	0
Huddersfield Town	Total		1	0	0	0	0	0	0	0	1	0
York City (loan)	2010–11	Conference Premier	0	0	0	0	—		0	0	0	0
Inverness Caledonian Thistle (loan)	2011–12	Scottish Premier League	5	0	0	0	0	0	0	0	5	0
Accrington Stanley	2012–13	League Two	6	0	0	0	1	0	1 (Note: Appearances in Football League Trophy)	0	8	0
Bury	2013–14	League Two	0	0	0	0	0	0	0	0	0	0
Chester (loan)	2013–14	Conference Premier	7	1	0	0	—		0	0	7	1
AFC Fylde	2013–14	NPL Premier Division	3	0	0	0	1	1	0	0	4	1
Ashton United	2013–14	NPL Premier Division	3	0	0	0	0	0	0	0	3	0
Stalybridge Celtic	2014–15	Conference North	28	7	1	0	—		1 (Note: Appearances in Cheshire Senior Cup)	0	30	7
Stalybridge Celtic	2015–16	National League North	35	1	4	0	—		5 (Note: One appearance in FA Trophy, three appearances and one goal in Manchester Premier Cup, one appearance in Cheshire Senior Cup)	1	40	2
Stalybridge Celtic	2016–17	National League North	15	4	2	0	—		3 (Note: Two appearances and one goal in FA Trophy, one appearance in Manchester Premier Cup)	1	20	5
Stalybridge Celtic	Total		78	12	7	0	—		9	2	94	14
Bradford Park Avenue	2016–17	National League North	1	0	—				0	0	1	0
Career total			104	13	7	0	2	1	10	2	123	16
