= Luke Sharry =

English footballer (born 1990)

Personal information
- Date of birth: 9 March 1990 (age 36)
- Place of birth: Leeds, England
- Height: 1.78 m (5 ft 10 in)
- Position: Midfielder

Team information
- Current team: Tadcaster Albion

Youth career
- Bradford City

Senior career*
Years	Team	Apps	(Gls)
2009–2010	Bradford City	2	(0)
2009	→ Barrow (loan)	3	(0)
2010–2011	Guiseley	34	(0)
2011–2012	Worksop Town		
2012	Garforth Town		
2012–2014	Ossett Town		
2014	Droylsden		
2014	FC United of Manchester		
2014	Frickley Athletic		
2014	Droylsden		
2014–2017	Ossett Albion		
2017–2022	Yorkshire Amateur		
2022	Eccleshill United		
2022–	Tadcaster Albion		
- * Club domestic league appearances and goals as of 13:52, 26 April 2015 (UTC)

Luke Sharry (born 9 March 1990) is an English footballer who plays for Tadcaster Albion, as a midfielder.

== Career ==
Born in Leeds, Sharry was a member of Bradford City's youth team, and made his senior debut for them in the Football League on 2 May 2009, in the final game of the 2008–09 season, against Chesterfield. Sharry had previously spent a one-month loan spell at Barrow in January 2009, where he made three appearances in the league for them. He signed a new contract with Bradford City in June 2009, but was released from his contract at the end of the 2009–10 season, having made four appearances for them in all competitions. He then went on trial with Grimsby Town in April 2010.

He signed for Guiseley in July 2010 after appearing for them in pre-season friendlies, and he signed a new contract with them in July 2011. However, he was released two weeks later, and later joined Worksop Town.

After spells with Garforth Town and Ossett Town, Sharry moved to Droylsden in January 2014. Sharry then played for FC United of Manchester before moving to Frickley Athletic in March 2014. After returning to Droylsden, Sharry moved to Ossett Albion in December 2014.

In August 2022, Sharry signed for Eccleshill United before moving to Tadcaster Albion in October of the same year.
