= Louis Horne =

English footballer (born 1991)

Personal information
- Full name: Louis Peter Horne
- Date of birth: 28 May 1991 (age 35)
- Place of birth: Bradford, England
- Position: Defender

Youth career
- 1999–2009: Bradford City

Senior career*
Years	Team	Apps	(Gls)
2009–2011	Bradford City	1	(0)
2009	→ Barrow (loan)	1	(0)
2010	→ Fleetwood Town (loan)	1	(0)
2010	FC Halifax Town	1	(0)
2011	Hinckley United	6	(1)
2011	Buxton	7	(0)
2011–2012	Northwich Victoria	1	(0)
2012	Vauxhall Motors	3	(0)
2012	Goole		
2012–?	FC United of Manchester		
?–2013	Scarborough Athletic		
2013–2014	Mossley		
2014	Goole		
2014–	Ossett Town		
?–2016	FC United of Manchester		
2016–?	Frickley Athletic		
- * Club domestic league appearances and goals as of 20:05, 9 November 2012 (UTC)

Louis Horne (born 28 May 1991) is an English footballer who plays as a defender.

== Career ==
Horne was born in Bradford. He joined Bradford City's Centre of Excellence in 1999, and progressed through the club's junior teams until he received a first-team squad number during the 2008–09 season. He joined Barrow on loan in February 2009, and made his first competitive appearance in senior men's football, playing the whole of Barrow's 3–0 defeat away to Oxford United in the Conference, but the loan was cut short by Bradford a few days later. A versatile defender, Horne was named Bradford City's Youth Team Player of the Year for 2008–09.

Given his first professional contract before the 2009–10 season, Horne was an unused substitute on several occasions before making his Football League debut on 2 January 2010 in Bradford's 1–1 draw with Cheltenham Town, as a second-half substitute replacing Jamie O'Brien when the team was reorganised after Steve Williams was sent off.

In October 2010, Horne was signed on loan by Conference National side Fleetwood Town.

In August 2011, Horne signed for Hinckley United, but was released from the club in October 2011.

In December 2011, Horne signed for Andy Preece and his Northwich Victoria outfit after a short spell at Buxton, where he had made 7 appearances. He made his league debut for Northwich as an 86th-minute substitute for Lewis Short in a 2–1 victory over F.C. United of Manchester on 17 December 2011; this would prove his only appearance for the club.

In February 2012, Horne moved to Conference North side Vauxhall Motors in February 2012. He made his debut for Vauxhall Motors in a 2–1 loss at Gloucester City on 18 February 2012.

On 27 August 2012, Horne signed with Goole of the Northern Premier League Division One North. He would later sign with FC United of Manchester on 9 November 2012.

After this he played for Scarborough Athletic, Mossley, Goole and Ossett Albion.

He later joined Harrogate Railway Athletic. before in January 2016 moving to Frickley Athletic.
