= Román Golobart =

Spanish footballer

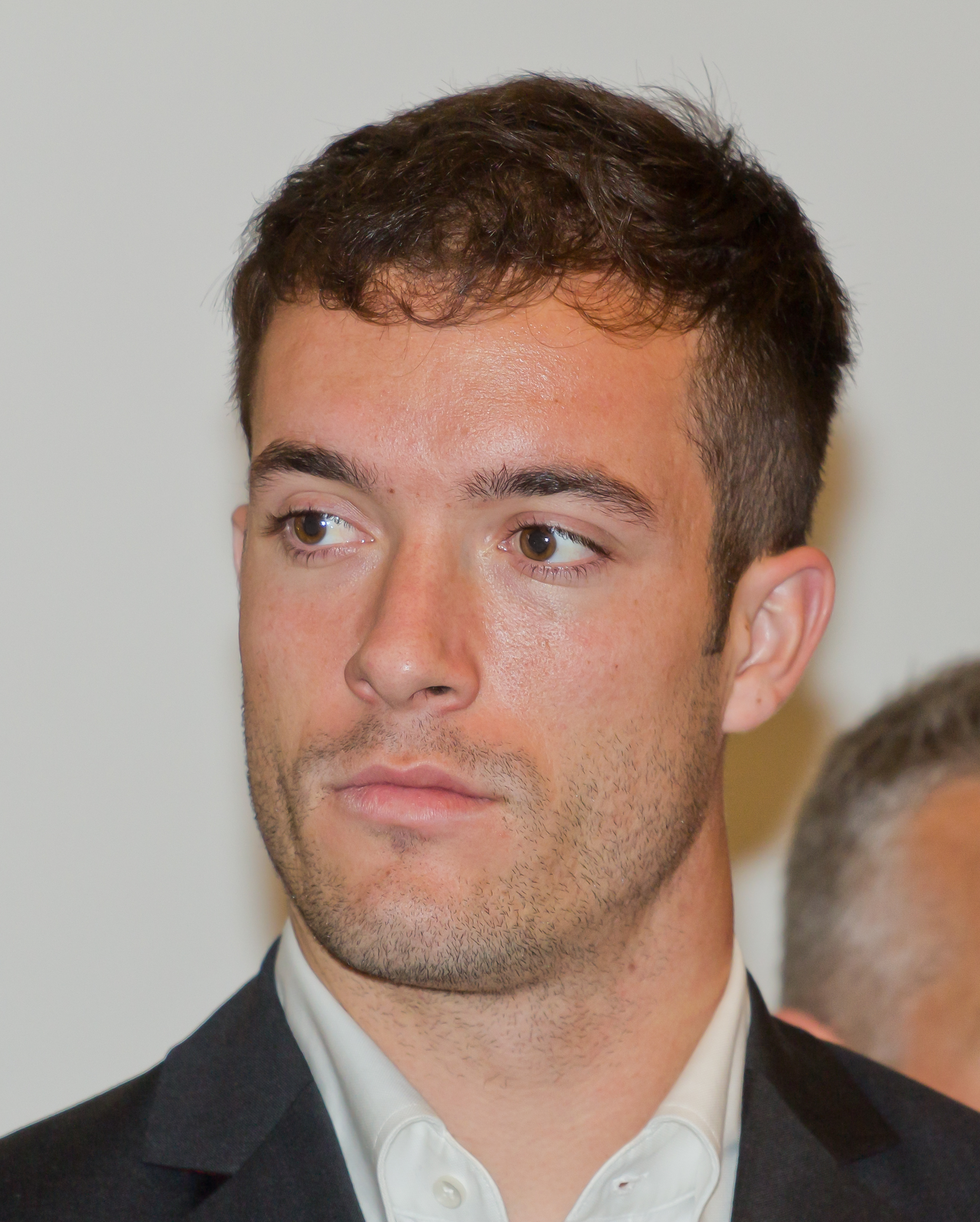
- Golobart being presented at 1. FC Köln

Personal information
- Full name: Román Golobart Benet
- Date of birth: 21 March 1992 (age 34)
- Place of birth: Barcelona, Spain
- Height: 1.93 m (6 ft 4 in)
- Position: Centre-back

Youth career
- 2006–2009: Espanyol

Senior career*
Years	Team	Apps	(Gls)
2009–2013	Wigan Athletic	3	(0)
2011–2012	→ Inverness Caledonian Thistle (loan)	22	(2)
2012	→ Tranmere Rovers (loan)	1	(0)
2013–2015	1. FC Köln	5	(0)
2013–2015	1. FC Köln II	2	(2)
2015	→ Erzgebirge Aue (loan)	4	(0)
2015–2016	Racing Ferrol	34	(1)
2016–2017	Murcia	34	(3)
2017–2018	Elche	12	(0)
2018	Mérida	10	(0)
2018–2019	Nea Salamina	21	(1)
2019–2020	Maccabi Netanya	10	(2)
2020–2021	AEK Larnaca	5	(0)
2021	Doxa	15	(1)
2021–2023	Nea Salamina		
Total		178	(12)

International career
2008	Spain U17	2	(0)
- * Club domestic league appearances and goals

Román Golobart Benet (born 21 March 1992) is a Spanish former professional footballer who played as a central defender.

== Club career ==
=== Wigan Athletic ===
Born in Barcelona, Catalonia, 17-year-old Golobart signed for Wigan Athletic from RCD Espanyol on 7 August 2009 as new manager Roberto Martínez identified him as a future talent. Despite appearances in pre-season friendlies and on the substitutes bench, he failed to play a competitive match in his first two seasons at the club, and in August 2011 was loaned to Scottish Premier League side Inverness Caledonian Thistle for six months. He made his debut the following day at Pittodrie against Aberdeen, but was unaccustomed to the pace of Scottish football and made two significant errors during the 2–1 away loss.

Golobart scored his first goal for Inverness on 24 December 2011, also against Aberdeen but now in a 2–1 home win. Shortly before the game he had expressed a desire to extend his loan spell, which eventually befell under manager Terry Butcher, with the pair having previously been engaged in a heated discussion during training, and he made his last appearance for the club in a 1–0 away victory over St Mirren, also winning the Young Player of the Year award.

On 31 August 2012, Golobart joined Tranmere Rovers on a one-month loan. He made his debut a day later in a 4–0 win against Colchester United, but failed to play again for his new team following Ash Taylor's early return from injury.

Golobart played his first match for Wigan on 5 January 2013, in the third round of the FA Cup against Bournemouth. He made his Premier League debut for the Latics that same month, starting at Stoke City in a 2–2 draw.

=== 1. FC Köln ===
At the end of the 2012–13 season, Golobart turned down a new deal with Wigan and signed a three-year contract with 1. FC Köln. He made his debut in the 2. Bundesliga on 20 July 2013, playing the full 90 minutes in a 1–1 away draw against Dynamo Dresden.

In February 2015, Golobart was loaned to FC Erzgebirge Aue also in the German second division for the remainder of the campaign.

=== Return to Spain ===
On 21 August 2015, Golobart returned to his homeland, signing a one-year deal with the option of a second at third-tier team Racing de Ferrol, contributing two goals from 36 appearances as they reached the play-offs. The following 23 July, he transferred to Real Murcia CF in the same league.

After the latter's defeat to Valencia CF Mestalla in the playoffs, Golobart joined Elche CF in June 2017. In November, his club warned him over controversial online comments relating to the political unrest in his native region. In January 2018, having rescinded his contract at the Estadio Martínez Valero, he moved to Mérida AD also from division three.

== International career ==
Golobart represented Spain at under-17 level. His first cap came in a 1–1 draw with England.

== Personal life ==
Golobart's father, Joan, was also a footballer. He also represented Espanyol, but at senior level.

Golobart shared his birthdate with fellow Espanyol youth graduate Jordi Amat.

== Career statistics ==
As of 8 December 2013

Club statistics
Club	Season	League		Cup		League Cup		Other		Total	
Club	Season	App	Goals	App	Goals	App	Goals	App	Goals	App	Goals
Wigan Athletic	2010–11	0	0	0	0	0	0	0	0	0	0
Wigan Athletic	2011–12	0	0	0	0	0	0	0	0	0	0
Inverness Caledonian Thistle	2011–12	22	2	2	0	1	0	0	0	25	2
Wigan Athletic	2012–13	3	0	5	0	0	0	0	0	8	0
Tranmere Rovers	2012–13	1	0	0	0	0	0	0	0	1	0
1. FC Köln	2013–14	3	0	1	0	0	0	0	0	4	0
Total		27	2	8	0	1	0	0	0	36	2

== Honours ==
Wigan Athletic

- FA Cup: 2012–13
