= 2011–12 Inverness Caledonian Thistle F.C. season =

Scottish football club season

Inverness Caledonian Thistle
2011–12 season
- Chairman: George Fraser (Until 22 September 2011); Kenny Cameron (From 22 September 2011)
- Manager: Terry Butcher
- Stadium: Caledonian Stadium
- SPL: Tenth
- Scottish Cup: Fifth round, lost to Celtic
- League Cup: Second round, lost to Ayr United
- Top goalscorer: League: Grégory Tadé (9); All: Grégory Tadé (9); Jonny Hayes (9)
- Highest home attendance: 6,623 v Rangers, 13 August 2011
- Lowest home attendance: 3,036 v Dunfermline Athletic, 2 May 2012
- Average home league attendance: 4,181
Home colours	Away colours

The 2011–12 season was Inverness Caledonian Thistle's second consecutive season in the Scottish Premier League, having competed in the league since their promotion in the 2009–10 season. Inverness also competed in the League Cup and the Scottish Cup.

== Summary ==
Inverness finished tenth in the Scottish Premier League. They reached the fifth round of the Scottish Cup where they were beaten by semifinalists Celtic. They were beaten in the second round of the League Cup by First Division side Ayr United.

== Results and fixtures ==
Win Draw Loss

=== Preseason ===
27 June 2011	Clachnacuddin	0–2	Inverness Caledonian Thistle	Grant Street Park, Inverness
19:30 BST

2 July 2011	Elgin City	0–3	Inverness Caledonian Thistle	Borough Briggs, Elgin
17:00 BST		Elgin City Report	Foran 35' 56' 58'

10 July 2011	Livingston	1–1	Inverness Caledonian Thistle	Huish Park, Yeovil
17:00 BST	Jacobs 66'	Livingston FC Report	Foran 38'	Attendance: 507; Referee: Steve Conroy

12 July 2011	(England) Yeovil Town	2–4	Inverness Caledonian Thistle	Huish Park, Yeovil
19:40 BST	Upson 8' Blizzard 72'	YTFC Report	Tansey 18', 60' (pen.) Shinnie 70' Foran 81'

14 July 2011	(England) Bristol Rovers	2–2	Inverness Caledonian Thistle	Twerton Park, Bath
19:40 BST	McGleish 26' (pen.); McLaggon 72'	Bristol Rovers Report	Ross 50' 80'	Attendance: 841

19 July 2011	Buckie Thistle	3–3	Inverness Caledonian Thistle	Victoria Park, Buckie
19:40 BST

=== Scottish Premier League ===
23 July 2011 Scottish Premier League	Motherwell	3–0	Inverness Caledonian Thistle	Fir Park, Motherwell
15:00	Hammell 25'; Murphy 28'; Lasley 77'	BBC Report		Attendance: 4,190; Referee: Steven McLean

30 July 2011 Scottish Premier League	Inverness Caledonian Thistle	0–1	Hibernian	Caledonian Stadium, Inverness
15:00		BBC Report	O'Connor 92'	Attendance: 3,600; Referee: Steve Conroy

6 August 2011 Scottish Premier League	Dunfermline Athletic	3–3	Inverness Caledonian Thistle	East End Park, Dunfermline
	Kirk 26', 52'; Hardie 90'	BBC	Tansey 46', 83'; Hayes 76'	Attendance: 3,378; Referee: Stephen Finnie

13 August 2011 Scottish Premier League	Inverness Caledonian Thistle	0–2	Rangers	Caledonian Stadium, Inverness
	Jelavic 60'; Edu 68'; Edu (yellow card) 75' (red card)	BBC Report	Tokely (red card) 59'	Attendance: 6,623; Referee: Norris

20 August 2011 Scottish Premier League	Aberdeen	2–1	Inverness Caledonian Thistle	Pittodrie, Aberdeen
15:00	Milsom 12'; Vernon 27'	BBC Sport	Foran 79'	Attendance: 7,989; Referee: Crawford Allan

27 August 2011 Scottish Premier League	Inverness Caledonian Thistle	2–1	Kilmarnock	Caledonian Stadium, Inverness
15:00	Tade 26'; Shinnie 89'	BBC Sport	Shiels 35'	Attendance: 3,348; Referee: Madden

10 September 2011 Scottish Premier League	Inverness Caledonian Thistle	1–1	Heart of Midlothian	Caledonian Stadium, Inverness
15:00	Tadé 50'	BBC Report	Elliott 81'	Attendance: 4,106; Referee: Collum

17 September 2011 Scottish Premier League	Dundee United	3–1	Inverness Caledonian Thistle	Tannadice Park, Dundee
15:00	Dalla Valle 13'; Swanson 43'; Daly 71'	BBC Sport	Ross 16'	Attendance: 6,497; Referee: Conroy

24 September 2011 Scottish Premier League	Celtic	2–0	Inverness Caledonian Thistle	Celtic Park, Glasgow
15:00	Ledley 28'; Forrest 33'	BBC Sport		Attendance: 47,382; Referee: Willie Collum

1 October 2011 Scottish Premier League	Inverness Caledonian Thistle	2–1	St Mirren	Caledonian Stadium, Inverness
15:00	Shinnie 31'; Tade 78'	BBC Sport	McAusland 23'	Attendance: 3,249; Referee: Salmond

15 October 2011 Scottish Premier League	St Johnstone	2–0	Inverness Caledonian Thistle	McDiarmid Park, Perth
15:00	Sandaza 12'; Mackay 65'	BBC Sport		Attendance: 2,909; Referee: Thomson

22 October 2011 Scottish Premier League	Inverness Caledonian Thistle	1–1	Dunfermline Athletic	Caledonian Stadium, Inverness
15:00	Tadé 33'	BBC Sport	Buchanan 86' (pen.)	Attendance: 3,241; Referee: McLean

29 October 2011 Scottish Premier League	Inverness Caledonian Thistle	2–3	Motherwell	Caledonian Stadium, Inverness
15:00	Davis 4'; Shinnie 76'; Hogg (red card) 83'	BBC Sport	Hutchinson 39'; Lasley 77'; Hateley 87'	Attendance: 3,188; Referee: Allan

5 November 2011 Scottish Premier League	Kilmarnock	3–6	Inverness Caledonian Thistle	Rugby Park, Kilmarnock
	Shiels 12', 73' (pen.); Heffernan 90'	BBC Sport	Shinnie 39', 60', 66'; Hayes 53'; Tadé 62', 83'	Attendance: 5,626; Referee: Madden

19 November 2011 Scottish Premier League	Inverness Caledonian Thistle	0–2	Celtic	Caledonian Stadium, Inverness
15:00	Tansey (red card) 37'	BBC Sport	Stokes 61', 72'	Attendance: 6,435; Referee: O'Reilly

26 November 2011 Scottish Premier League	Heart of Midlothian	2–1	Inverness Caledonian Thistle	Tynecastle Stadium, Edinburgh
15:00	Skacel 46'; Jonsson 76'	BBC Sport	Tokely 58'	Attendance: 12,021; Referee: Thomson

3 December 2011 Scottish Premier League	St Mirren	1–2	Inverness Caledonian Thistle	St Mirren Park, Paisley
15:00	Thompson 45+2'	BBC Sport	Shinnie 11'; Hayes 69'	Attendance: 3,675; Referee: Norris

10 December 2011 Scottish Premier League	Inverness Caledonian Thistle	2–3	Dundee United	Caledonian Stadium, Inverness
15:00	Hayes 2'; McKay 47'; Davis (yellow card) 82' (yellow-red card)	BBC Sport	Russell 51', 78'; Golobart 64' (o.g.)	Attendance: 3,142; Referee: McLean

17 December 2011 Scottish Premier League	Rangers	2–1	Inverness Caledonian Thistle	Ibrox Stadium, Glasgow
15:00	Bocanegra 55'; Lafferty 83'	BBC Sport	Shinnie 67'	Attendance: 43,701; Referee: Madden

24 December 2011 Scottish Premier League	Inverness Caledonian Thistle	2–1	Aberdeen	Caledonian Stadium, Inverness
12:30	Golobart 64'; Tadé 69'	BBC Sport	Fallon 76'	Attendance: 5,888; Referee: Muir

28 December 2011 Scottish Premier League	Hibernian	1–1	Inverness Caledonian Thistle	Easter Road, Edinburgh
19:45	O'Connor 8'	BBC Sport	Hayes 41'	Attendance: 6,923; Referee: McLean

14 January 2012 Scottish Premier League	Motherwell	0–1	Inverness Caledonian Thistle	Fir Park, Motherwell
15:00		BBC Sport	Tadé 67'	Attendance: 4,152; Referee: Madden

21 January 2012 Scottish Premier League	Inverness Caledonian Thistle	1–0	Heart of Midlothian	Caledonian Stadium, Inverness
15:00	Sutherland 49'	BBC Sport		Attendance: 3,812; Referee: Salmond

28 January 2012 Scottish Premier League	Inverness Caledonian Thistle	0–0	St Mirren	Caledonian Stadium, Inverness
15:00		BBC Sport		Attendance: 3,044; Referee: Finnie

11 February 2012 Scottish Premier League	Celtic	1–0	Inverness Caledonian Thistle	Caledonian Stadium, Inverness
15:00	Ledley 16'; Majstorovic (red card) 60'	BBC Sport	Williams (yellow card) 78' (red card)	Attendance: 50,014; Referee: Mclean

18 February 2012 Scottish Premier League	Dunfermline Athletic	1–1	Inverness Caledonian Thistle	East End Park, Dunfermline
15:00	Cardle 45'	BBC Sport	Ross 73'	Attendance: 2,881; Referee: Madden

26 February 2012 Scottish Premier League	Inverness Caledonian Thistle	1–4	Rangers	Caledonian Stadium, Inverness
12:45	Williams 40'	BBC Sport	Davis 6'; Aluko 16'; Little 36'; McCulloch 72'	Attendance: 6,416; Referee: Collum

5 March 2012 Scottish Premier League	Dundee United	3–0	Inverness Caledonian Thistle	Tannadice Park, Dundee
19:45	Rankin 15'; Robertson 52'; Russell 78'	BBC Sport		Attendance: 5,994; Referee: Muir

10 March 2012 Scottish Premier League	Inverness Caledonian Thistle	1–1	Kilmarnock	Caledonian Stadium, Inverness
15:00	Golobart 83'	BBC Sport	Golobart 31' (Own goal)	Attendance: 3,060; Referee: Murray

24 March 2012 Scottish Premier League	Aberdeen	0–1	Inverness Caledonian Thistle	Pittodrie Stadium, Aberdeen
15:00		BBC Sport	Tadé 10'; Meekings (yellow card) 58' (yellow-red card)	Attendance: 8,939; Referee: Finnie

28 March 2012 Scottish Premier League	Inverness Caledonian Thistle	0–1	St Johnstone	Caledonian Stadium, Inverness
19:45		BBC Sport	Sandaza 41' (pen.)	Attendance: 3,035; Referee: Collum

1 April 2012 Scottish Premier League	Inverness Caledonian Thistle	2–3	Hibernian	Caledonian Stadium, Inverness
15:00	Tansey 60' (pen.); Hayes 83'	BBC Sport	Hanlon 64'; O'Connor 75'; Griffiths 85'	Attendance: 3,274; Referee: Madden

7 April 2012 Scottish Premier League	St Johnstone	0–0	Inverness Caledonian Thistle	McDiarmid Park, Perth
15:00		BBC Sport		Attendance: 3,326; Referee: Clancy

21 April 2012 Scottish Premier League	Inverness Caledonian Thistle	0–2	Aberdeen	Caledonian Stadium, Inverness
15:00		BBC Sport	Golobart 46' (o.g.); Gillet 89' (o.g.)	Attendance: 3,487; Referee: McLean

28 April 2012 Scottish Premier League	Kilmarnock	4–3	Inverness Caledonian Thistle	Rugby Park, Kilmarnock
15:00	Fowler 14'; Nelson 66'; Shiels 80', 85'	BBC Sport	McKay 29', 35'; Hayes (yellow card) 58' (red card); Williams 90'	Attendance: 3,848; Referee: Salmond

2 May 2012 Scottish Premier League	Inverness Caledonian Thistle	0–0	Dunfermline Athletic	Caledonian Stadium, Inverness
15:00		BBC Sport		Attendance: 3,036; Referee: O'Reilly

5 May 2012 Scottish Premier League	St Mirren	0–1	Inverness Caledonian Thistle	St Mirren Park, Paisley
15:00		BBC Sport	Foran 85'	Attendance: 3,540; Referee: Murray

12 May 2012 Scottish Premier League	Inverness Caledonian Thistle	2–0	Hibernian	Caledonian Stadium, Inverness
15:00	Tansey 62'; Hayes 71' (pen.)	BBC Sport		Attendance: 4,457; Referee: Beaton

=== Scottish League Cup ===
24 August 2011 Scottish League Cup round 2	Ayr United	1–0	Inverness Caledonian Thistle	Somerset Park, Ayr
15:00	Malone 60'	BBC Sport		Attendance: 987; Referee: Winter

=== Scottish Cup ===
7 January 2012 Scottish Cup round 4	Inverness Caledonian Thistle	1–1	Dunfermline Athletic	Caledonian Stadium, Inverness
15:00	Gillet (red card) 29'; Hayes 90'	Sky Report	Barrowman 30'	Attendance: 1,601; Referee: Norris

18 January 2012 Scottish Cup round 4 replay	Dunfermline Athletic	1 – 3 (a.e.t.)	Inverness Caledonian Thistle	East End Park, Dunfermline
19:45	Barrowman 40'	BBC Sport	Hayes 54'; A. Shinnie 93'; Tansey 110'	Attendance: 1,594; Referee: Norris

4 February 2012 Scottish Cup round 5	Inverness Caledonian Thistle	0–2	Celtic	Caledonian Stadium, Inverness
12:45		BBC Report	Samaras 33'; Brown 68'	Attendance: 5,743; Referee: Murray

== Player statistics ==
=== Captains ===
No.	P	Name	Country	No. games	Notes
9	FW	Richie Foran	(Republic of Ireland)	41	Club captain

Last updated: 13 May 2012
Source: Competitive match reports.
Competitive matches only
Matches started as captain only
Country: FIFA nationality; No.: Squad number; P: Position; Name: Player name; No. Games: Number of games started as captain.

=== Squad ===
Last updated 13 May 2012

No.	Pos	Nat	Player	Total		SPL		Scottish Cup		League Cup	
No.	Pos	Nat	Player	Apps	Goals	Apps	Goals	Apps	Goals	Apps	Goals
1	GK	(Scotland) SCO	Ryan Esson	33	0	33	0	0	0	0	0
2	DF	(Austria) AUT	Thomas Piermayr	23	0	20	0	2	0	1	0
3	DF	(Scotland) SCO	Ross Tokely	32	1	29	1	2	0	1	0
4	DF	(Wales) WAL	Owain Tudur Jones	15	0	15	0	0	0	0	0
5	MF	(England) ENG	Chris Hogg	10	0	9	0	0	0	1	0
6	MF	(England) ENG	Lee Cox	9	0	7	0	2	0	0	0
7	MF	(Republic of Ireland) IRL	Jonny Hayes	29	9	25	7	3	2	1	0
8	MF	(England) ENG	Greg Tansey	39	5	36	4	3	1	0	0
9	FW	(Republic of Ireland) IRL	Richie Foran	41	2	37	2	3	0	1	0
10	MF	(Scotland) SCO	Andrew Shinnie	19	8	17	7	1	1	1	0
11	MF	(Scotland) SCO	Nick Ross	32	2	29	2	2	0	1	0
12	GK	(Northern Ireland) NIR	Jonathan Tuffey	9	0	5	0	3	0	1	0
14	DF	(Scotland) SCO	David Proctor	19	0	17	0	2	0	0	0
15	FW	(France) FRA	Grégory Tadé	40	9	36	9	3	0	1	0
16	DF	(Spain) ESP	Roman Golobart	25	2	22	2	2	0	1	0
17	MF	(Scotland) SCO	Gavin Morrison	5	0	4	0	0	0	1	0
18	FW	(Scotland) SCO	Shane Sutherland	30	1	28	1	1	0	1	0
19	DF	(Scotland) SCO	Graeme Shinnie	32	1	28	1	3	0	1	0
20	DF	(Scotland) SCO	Tom Aldred	4	0	4	0	0	0	0	0
20	MF	(England) ENG	Aidan Chippendale	5	0	5	0	0	0	0	0
20	FW	(England) ENG	Sam Winnall	3	0	2	0	1	0	0	0
21	FW	(Northern Ireland) NIR	Billy McKay	24	3	22	3	2	0	0	0
22	DF	(France) FRA	Kenny Gillet	27	0	25	0	2	0	0	0
23	MF	(Republic of Ireland) IRL	Aaron Doran	12	0	10	0	1	0	1	0
24	DF	(England) ENG	Steve Williams	9	2	9	2	0	0	0	0
25	MF	(England) ENG	David Davis	15	1	14	1	1	0	0	0
25	MF	(France) FRA	Claude Gnakpa	8	0	7	0	1	0	0	0
26	DF	(England) ENG	Josh Meekings	21	0	19	0	2	0	0	0
31	MF	(Scotland) SCO	Liam Polworth	0	0	0	0	0	0	0	0

=== Disciplinary record ===
Includes all competitive matches.

Last updated 13 May 2012

Number	Nation	Position	Name	Scottish Premier League		League Cup		Scottish Cup		Total	
Number	Nation	Position	Name	Yellow card	Red card	Yellow card	Red card	Yellow card	Red card	Yellow card	Red card
1	(Scotland)	GK	Ryan Esson	0	0	0	0	0	0	0	0
2	(Austria)	DF	Thomas Piermayr	6	0	1	0	0	0	7	0
3	(Scotland)	DF	Ross Tokely	5	1	0	0	0	0	5	1
4	(Wales)	DF	Owain Tudur Jones	1	0	0	0	0	0	1	0
5	(England)	MF	Chris Hogg	2	1	0	0	0	0	2	1
6	(England)	MF	Lee Cox	1	0	1	0	0	0	2	0
7	(Republic of Ireland)	MF	Jonny Hayes	2	1	1	0	0	0	3	1
8	(England)	MF	Greg Tansey	6	1	0	0	0	0	6'	1
9	(Republic of Ireland)	FW	Richie Foran	11	0	1	0	0	0	12	0
10	(Scotland)	MF	Andrew Shinnie	1	0	0	0	0	0	1	0
11	(Scotland)	MF	Nick Ross	1	0	0	0	0	0	1	0
12	(Northern Ireland)	GK	Jonathan Tuffey	0	0	0	0	0	0	0	0
14	(Scotland)	DF	David Proctor	1	0	1	0	0	0	2	0
15	(France)	FW	Grégory Tadé	2	0	0	0	1	0	3	0
16	(Spain)	FW	Roman Golobart	5	0	0	0	1	0	6	0
17	(Scotland)	MF	Gavin Morrison	0	0	0	0	0	0	0	0
18	(Scotland)	FW	Shane Sutherland	1	0	0	0	0	0	1	0
19	(Scotland)	DF	Graeme Shinnie	6	0	0	0	0	0	6	0
20	(Scotland)	DF	Tom Aldred	0	0	0	0	0	0	0	0
20	(England)	MF	Aidan Chippendale	0	0	0	0	0	0	0	0
20	(England)	FW	Sam Winnall	0	0	0	0	0	0	0	0
21	(Northern Ireland)	FW	Billy McKay	0	0	0	0	0	0	0	0
22	(France)	DF	Kenny Gillet	4	0	0	1	0	0	4	1
23	(Republic of Ireland)	MF	Aaron Doran	1	0	0	0	0	0	1	0
24	(England)	DF	Steve Williams	2	1	0	0	0	0	2	1
25	(England)	MF	David Davis	5	1	0	0	0	0	5	1
25	(France)	MF	Claude Gnakpa	1	0	0	0	0	0	1	0
26	(England)	DF	Josh Meekings	4	1	0	0	0	0	4	1
31	(Scotland)	MF	Liam Polworth	0	0	0	0	0	0	0	0

== Team statistics ==
=== League table ===
Pos	Team	Pld	W	D	L	GF	GA	GD	Pts	Qualification or relegation
8	St Mirren	38	9	16	13	39	51	−12	43	
9	Aberdeen	38	9	14	15	36	44	−8	41	
10	Inverness Caledonian Thistle	38	10	9	19	42	60	−18	39	
11	Hibernian	38	8	9	21	40	67	−27	33	
12	Dunfermline Athletic (R)	38	5	10	23	40	82	−42	25	Relegation to the First Division

Source: SPFL Archive
Rules for classification: 1) points; 2) goal difference; 3) number of goals scored.
(R) Relegated

=== Hat-tricks ===
Player	Competition	Score	Opponent	Date
(Republic of Ireland) Richie Foran	Friendly	0–3	Elgin City	2 July 2011
(Scotland) Andrew Shinnie	Scottish Premier League	3–6	Kilmarnock	5 November 2011

== Transfers ==
Inverness' first significant move in the close season was to release 10 first team players. Two players also returned from loan back to their parent club. Chris Hogg was originally released by Caley Thistle at end of the season but later re-signed.

=== Players in ===
Player	From	Fee
Grégory Tadé	Raith Rovers	Free
Greg Tansey	Stockport County	Free
Tom Aldred	Watford	Loan
Andrew Shinnie	Rangers	Free
Josh Meekings	Ipswich Town	Free
Aaron Doran	Blackburn Rovers	Free
Thomas Piermayr	LASK Linz	Free
Billy McKay	Northampton Town	Free
Owain Tudur Jones	Norwich City	Free
Roman Golobart	Wigan Athletic	Loan
Aidan Chippendale	Huddersfield Town	Loan
David Davis	Wolverhampton Wanderers	Loan
Steve Williams	Bradford City	Loan
Sam Winnall	Wolves	Loan
Claude Gnakpa	Walsall	Free

=== Players out ===
Player	To	Fee
Grant Munro	Ross County	Free
Roy McBain	Peterhead	Free
Stuart Golabek	Brora Rangers	Free
Russell Duncan	Ross County	Free
Max Johnson	Blyth Spartans	Free
Chris Innes	Arbroath	Free
Gil Blumstein	Free agent	Free
Dani Sánchez	Wellington Phoenix	Free
Eric Odhiambo	Denizlispor	Free
Adam Rooney	Birmingham	Free
Chris Moir	Brora Rangers	Free
Lee Cox	Swindon Town	Undisclosed
Gavin Morrison	Grindavik	Loan
Claude Gnakpa	Free agent	Free
