= Jake Speight =

English footballer & agent (born 1985)

Personal information
- Full name: Jake Carl Speight
- Date of birth: 28 September 1985 (age 41)
- Place of birth: Sheffield, England
- Height: 1.70 m (5 ft 7 in)
- Position: Forward

Youth career
- Sheffield United

Senior career*
Years	Team	Apps	(Gls)
2002–2005	Sheffield United	0	(0)
2005	→ Leigh RMI (loan)		
2005	Scarborough	8	(2)
2005–2007	Bury	29	(2)
2007–2008	Northwich Victoria	4	(0)
2008–2009	Farsley Celtic		
2009	Droylsden	16	(5)
2009–2010	Mansfield Town	33	(17)
2010–2011	Bradford City	28	(4)
2010	→ Port Vale (loan)	4	(1)
2011–2012	Wrexham	38	(21)
2012–2014	Mansfield Town	29	(7)
2013–2014	→ Alfreton Town (loan)	4	(3)
2014–2015	Harrogate Town	22	(2)
2015	→ Alfreton Town (loan)	8	(0)
2015	King's Lynn Town	9	(0)
Total		232	(64)
- * Club domestic league appearances and goals

Jake Carl Speight (born 28 September 1985) is an English former professional footballer who played as a striker. He now works as a football agent.

Starting his career working through the Sheffield United youth team, in 2005, he signed with Scarborough, and later Bury. He dropped down to Conference football between 2007 and 2010, playing for Northwich Victoria, Farsley Celtic, Droylsden, and Mansfield Town. In 2010, he was signed by Bradford City and was quickly sent out on loan to Port Vale before signing permanently for Wrexham the following year. He returned to Mansfield Town in July 2012 and helped the club to the Conference Premier title in 2012–13. He was loaned to Alfreton Town in October 2013. He signed with Harrogate Town in July 2014 and returned to Alfreton Town on loan in March 2015 before he was transferred to King's Lynn Town in August 2015.

== Career ==
=== Early career ===
Speight began his career at Sheffield United, and was loaned out to Conference Premier side Leigh RMI in March 2005 to gain experience, along with Colin Marrison. He joined Scarborough on work experience in August 2005, scoring in both his first two appearances for the club, and impressing manager Nick Henry. He was allowed to join the "Seadogs" permanently, and therefore never made an appearance for the "Blades". Three months later he switched to Bury, of League Two. On 13 January 2006, he scored his first and second league goals, in a 3–2 victory over Torquay United. He finished the season with two goals in 17 appearances. He made another 17 appearances for Bury in 2006–07, mostly as a substitute, and failed to find the net all season. The club released him in June 2007.

Following his release from Bury, Speight dropped back into non-League football, signing for Northwich Victoria. He joined Conference North club Farsley Celtic in the summer of 2008, and then moved to Droylsden in March 2009. In May 2009, Speight joined Mansfield Town. He played 33 games, and scored 17 goals, becoming the club's top scorer despite having made most of his appearances as a substitute.

=== Bradford City ===
In June 2010, Bradford City bought Speight for £25,000, offering the player a two-year contract. "Stags" fans were disappointed at the fee; many had expected it to be much higher. He started his spell with his new club by receiving a jail sentence for assault – without having informed the club beforehand that he had a court case. His work rate on the pitch made him popular with supporters, but he found just one goal in twelve appearances. On 29 October 2010 he joined League Two promotion chasers Port Vale on a one-month loan. Manager Micky Adams had looked to sign the player permanently before he went to Bradford. His appearance in a goalless draw at the Pirelli Stadium with Burton Albion on 2 November 2010 earned Speight the honour of being the 1,000th player to play for Port Vale in the Football League. After scoring in a 5–0 win over Stockport County, Speight's loan spell was extended for a second month. He returned to Bradford in the new year.

=== Wrexham ===
In June 2011, he signed a two-year contract with Conference side Wrexham for an undisclosed fee. Manager Dean Saunders hoped he would prove an adequate replacement for outgoing striker Andy Mangan. After failing to score in his first four games, he opened his goal account for the "Reds" with a hat-trick over Alfreton Town in a 4–1 win at North Street. From 30 November to 18 February he scored in seven out of eight league appearances, and from 10 March to 14 April he hit seven goals in six games. He ended the season with 21 goals in 38 Conference games to become Wrexham's top scorer and the sixth most prolific scorer in the Conference. Wrexham picked up 98 points and finished second but failed to win promotion after losing to Luton Town in the play-offs. His record led to him becoming a target of Lincoln City manager David Holdsworth.

=== Mansfield Town ===
Speight re-joined former club Mansfield Town in July 2012 for an undisclosed fee. He was reported to have requested the transferred so as to be closer to his Sheffield home. Though Speight said that claims he handed in a transfer request were "a complete lie". He scored twice in his first game back at Field Mill, in a 4–3 defeat to Newport County. Mansfield won promotion into the Football League as Conference champions in 2012–13, though Speight missed the second half of the campaign after damaging cartilage in his knee.

In October 2013, he joined Alfreton Town on a one-month loan deal. He scored four goals in five games for the "Reds", and manager Nicky Law was disappointed when his loan spell at North Street was cut short by Mansfield the following month. However, he picked up a serious knee injury midway through the 2013–14 season and was ruled out of action until late March. Speight was released by Mansfield manager Paul Cox at the end of the 2013–14 season.

=== Non-League ===
In July 2014, Speight dropped down two divisions to the Conference North to join Harrogate Town in a move that reunited him with the manager Simon Weaver, his former teammate at Scarborough. He was unable to take part in pre-season training due to injury. On 20 March 2015, Speight re-joined Alfreton Town on a loan deal keeping him at the club until the end of the 2014–15 season.

In August 2015, Speight dropped down a division to the Southern League to join Gary Setchell's King's Lynn Town. Setchell said that Speight would prove to be a "very, very valuable acquisition". He left King's Lynn in October 2015; manager Gary Setchell stated that "he will probably retire now and he is also putting a lot of time into a new business venture".

== Personal life ==
In July 2010, Speight was jailed for 12 weeks after pleading guilty to assault. Speight appealed his sentence a week later and he was released from prison; a Crown Court judge ordered his sentence to be suspended for 18 months and that Speight conduct 100 hours of community work.

In 2015, he became a sports agent, licensed by The Football Association.

== Career statistics ==
Appearances and goals by club, season and competition
Club	Season	League			FA Cup		League Cup		Other		Total	
Club	Season	Division	Apps	Goals	Apps	Goals	Apps	Goals	Apps	Goals	Apps	Goals
Sheffield United	2002–03	First Division	0	0	0	0	0	0	0	0	0	0
Sheffield United	2003–04	First Division	0	0	0	0	0	0	0	0	0	0
Sheffield United	2004–05	Championship	0	0	0	0	0	0	0	0	0	0
Sheffield United	Total		0	0	0	0	0	0	0	0	0	0
Scarborough	2005–06	Conference Premier	8	2	0	0	—		0	0	8	2
Bury	2005–06	League Two	17	2	0	0	0	0	0	0	17	2
Bury	2006–07	League Two	12	0	4	0	0	0	1 (Note: Appearance(s) in the EFL Trophy.)	0	17	0
Bury	Total		29	2	4	0	0	0	1	0	34	2
Northwich Victoria	2007–08	Conference Premier	4	0	0	0	—		0	0	4	0
Droylsden	2008–09	Conference North	16	5	0	0	—		0	0	16	5
Mansfield Town	2009–10	Conference Premier	33	17	2	0	—		0	0	35	17
Bradford City	2010–11	League Two	28	4	0	0	2	1	1	0	31	5
Port Vale (loan)	2010–11	League Two	4	1	0	0	—		—		4	1
Wrexham	2011–12	Conference Premier	38	21	4	0	—		1 (Note: Appearance(s) in the play-offs.)	0	43	21
Mansfield Town	2012–13	Conference Premier	19	6	2	0	—		0	0	21	6
Mansfield Town	2013–14	League Two	10	1	0	0	1	0	0	0	11	1
Mansfield Town	Total		29	7	2	0	1	0	0	0	32	7
Alfreton Town (loan)	2013–14	Conference Premier	4	3	1	1	—		0	0	5	4
Harrogate Town	2014–15	Conference North	22	2	0	0	—		0	0	22	2
Alfreton Town (loan)	2014–15	Conference Premier	8	0	0	0	—		0	0	8	0
King's Lynn Town	2014–15	Southern League; Premier Division	9	0	1	0	—		0	0	10	0
Career total (Note: Statistics for Leigh RMI and Farsley Celtic not known.)			232	64	14	1	3	1	3	0	252	66
