= Alex Flett =

English footballer (born 1992)

Personal information
- Full name: Alexander Edward Flett
- Date of birth: 20 September 1992 (age 34)
- Place of birth: Grimsby, England
- Position: Midfielder

Team information
- Current team: Grimsby Borough

Youth career
- Bradford City

Senior career*
Years	Team	Apps	(Gls)
2011	Bradford City	1	(0)
2011	→ Ossett Town (loan)		
2011–2012	Brigg Town		
2012–2025	Cleethorpes Town	326+	(42+)
2025	→ North Ferriby (loan)	10	(1)
2025–	Grimsby Borough		
- * Club domestic league appearances and goals as of 18:23, 5 October 2025 (UTC)

Alexander Edward Flett (born 20 September 1992) is an English semi-professional footballer who plays as a midfielder for Grimsby Borough.

== Career ==
Born in Grimsby, Flett began his career with the youth team of Bradford City, and was awarded a first-team squad number in February 2011, alongside Dominic Rowe, with squad number 31. In March 2011, Flett went on a loan experience loan to Ossett Town. After returning to Bradford City, Flett made his senior debut for them on 7 May 2011, in a 1–5 defeat at home in the Football League. Flett was offered his first professional contract by Bradford on 9 May 2011. Flett was released from his contract with Bradford City by mutual consent on 10 August 2011, having made one appearance for them in the Football League.

Later that same month, Flett signed for Northern Premier League Division One South club Brigg Town.

He joined Cleethorpes Town in January 2012. By May 2017 he was the club's captain. That same month the club were runners-up in the 2017 FA Vase Final.

Flett joined North Ferriby on loan in February 2025, before being released by Cleethorpes in May 2025, having made a club record 532 appearances. He then signed for Grimsby Borough.

== Career statistics ==
As of 5 October 2025

Appearances and goals by club, season and competition
Club	Season	League		FA Cup		League Cup		Other		Total	
Club	Season	Apps	Goals	Apps	Goals	Apps	Goals	Apps	Goals	Apps	Goals
Bradford City	2010–11	1	0	0	0	0	0	0	0	1	0
Cleethorpes Town	2011–12	10	4	0	0	—		1	0	11	4
Cleethorpes Town	2012–13	15	1	0	0	—		0	0	15	1
Cleethorpes Town	2013–14	24	1	0	0	—		4	0	28	1
Cleethorpes Town	2014–15	33	4	0	0	—		12	1	45	5
Cleethorpes Town	2015–16	37	4	0	0	—		12	0	49	4
Cleethorpes Town	2016–17	0	0	0	0	—		11	1	11	1
Cleethorpes Town	2017–18	4	0	0	0	—		0	0	4	0
Cleethorpes Town	2018–19	38	6	7	3	—		7	0	52	9
Cleethorpes Town	2019–20	29	6	2	0	—		5 (Note: Two appearances in the FA Trophy, three appearances and one goal in the Lincolnshire Senior Cup)	1	36	7
Cleethorpes Town	2020–21	4	0	0	0	—		0	0	4	0
Cleethorpes Town	2021–22	36	3	6	1	—		2 (Note: One appearance in the FA Trophy, one appearance in the play-offs)	0	44	4
Cleethorpes Town	2022–23	34	4	2	1	—		2 (Note: One appearance in the FA Trophy, one appearance in the Lincolnshire Senior Cup)	0	38	5
Cleethorpes Town	2023–24	37	9	5	1	—		3 (Note: One appearance in the FA Trophy, two appearances in the Lincolnshire Senior Cup)	0	45	10
Cleethorpes Town	2024–25	25	0	4	0	—		4 (Note: Three appearances in the FA Trophy, one appearance in the Lincolnshire Senior Cup)	0	33	0
Cleethorpes Town	Total	326	42	26	6	0	0	63	3	415	51
North Ferriby (loan)	2024–25	10	1	0	0	0	0	0	0	10	1
Career total		336	43	26	6	0	0	63	3	425	52
