= Dominic Rowe =

English footballer (born 1993)

Personal information
- Date of birth: 23 April 1993 (age 33)
- Place of birth: Leeds, England
- Height: 5 ft 6 in (1.68 m)
- Position: Winger

Team information
- Current team: Frickley Athletic

Youth career
- xxxx–2011: Bradford City

Senior career*
Years	Team	Apps	(Gls)
2011–2012	Bradford City	2	(0)
2011	→ Barrow (loan)	10	(1)
2013–2015	Harrogate Town	46	(10)
2015	Scarborough Athletic		
2015–	Frickley Athletic		
- * Club domestic league appearances and goals as of 21:47, 8 March 2016 (UTC)

Dominic Rowe (born 23 April 1993) is an English semi-professional footballer who plays for Frickley Athletic, as a winger.

== Career ==
Born in Leeds, Rowe began his career with the youth team of Bradford City, and was awarded a first-team squad number in February 2011, alongside Alex Flett, with squad number 32. In March 2011, Rowe made Bradford's matchday squad for the first time, before making his senior debut for Bradford on 15 April 2011, in a 0–4 defeat away at Southend United. Rowe was offered his first professional contract by Bradford on 9 May 2011.

He joined Barrow on loan on 29 September 2011, making his debut two days later as a 48th-minute substitute in Barrow's 1–5 defeat away at Luton Town. On 31 October 2011, the loan deal was extended until 29 December 2011.

On 25 October 2011, Rowe signed a new 20-month contract with Bradford City.

His contract was cancelled by Bradford City in August 2012.

He signed for Harrogate Town in August 2013.

After being released by Harrogate, he signed for Scarborough Athletic in May 2015. He stated he was willing to drop down a division in order to play games. He left the club in October 2015 to join Frickley Athletic. His performances for Scarborough were criticised by the team's manager.

== Career statistics ==
As of 7 March 2016

Appearances and goals by club, season and competition
Club	Season	League		FA Cup		League Cup		Other		Total	
Club	Season	Apps	Goals	Apps	Goals	Apps	Goals	Apps	Goals	Apps	Goals
Bradford City	2010–11	2	0	0	0	0	0	0	0	2	0
Bradford City	2011–12	0	0	0	0	0	0	0	0	0	0
Bradford City	Total	2	0	0	0	0	0	0	0	2	0
Barrow (loan)	2011–12	10	1	0	0	0	0	1	0	11	1
Harrogate Town	2013–14	23	8	0	0	0	0	0	0	23	8
Harrogate Town	2014–15	23	2	0	0	0	0	1	0	24	2
Harrogate Town	Total	46	10	0	0	0	0	1	0	47	10
Career total		58	11	0	0	0	0	2	0	60	11
