= Steve Williams (footballer, born 1987) =

English footballer

Personal information
- Full name: Steven Antony Williams
- Date of birth: 24 April 1987 (age 39)
- Place of birth: Preston, England
- Position: Central defender

Senior career*
Years	Team	Apps	(Gls)
2005–2006	Charnock Richard		
2006–2007	Chorley		
2007–2008	Bamber Bridge		
2008–2009	Hyde United		
2009	Fleetwood Town		
2009	Bamber Bridge		
2009–2013	Bradford City	68	(7)
2012	→ Inverness Caledonian Thistle (loan)	9	(2)
2013	→ Barrow (loan)	3	(0)
2013–2014	Macclesfield Town	38	(2)
2014–2015	FC Halifax Town	26	(1)
2015–2016	Barrow	19	(1)
2016–2017	AFC Fylde	21	(7)
2017–2018	Lancaster City	10	(1)
Total		194	(21)
- * Club domestic league appearances and goals

Steven Antony Williams (born 24 April 1987) is an English former professional footballer who played as a central defender.

== Career ==
=== Early career ===
Born in Preston, Lancashire, Williams started his career with West Lancashire League side Charnock Richard. He moved up the leagues to Chorley before he joined Bamber Bridge in January 2007. He moved on to Hyde United at the start of the 2008–09 season, before moving to Fleetwood Town in January 2009. In February 2009, when he returned to Bamber Bridge. Williams balanced his semi-professional football career with a job as a barber.

=== Professional career ===
Williams signed his first professional contract with Bradford City in July 2009. Williams made his debut for Bradford on the opening day of the 2009–10 season, on 8 August 2009, in a 5–0 defeat against Notts County, when he came on as a second-half substitute for Matthew Clarke with City already losing 4–0. Williams scored his first goal for Bradford on 22 August 2009, in a 5–4 victory away at Cheltenham Town. Williams signed a new three-year contract in June 2010. Ahead of the 2011–12 season, Williams was informed by new manager Peter Jackson that he faced a "make or break" season.

In January 2012, Williams moved on loan to Inverness Caledonian Thistle. Upon his return to Bradford City, Williams ruptured his Achilles tendon, and his next appearance for Bradford City came in February 2013, as he played 45 minutes for their reserve side.

Williams signed on loan for Barrow in March 2013.

In May 2013, it was announced that Williams would leave his contract at the end of the season at the end of June 2013.

=== Return to non-league ===
He signed for Macclesfield Town in July 2013.

Williams joined Conference Premier side FC Halifax Town on 1 July 2014.

He returned to Barrow in July 2015.

He moved to AFC Fylde ahead of the 2016–17 season. On 11 May 2017, it was announced that Williams would leave Fylde upon the expiry of his current deal in June 2017.

He played with Northern Premier League club Lancaster City during the 2017–18 season, making 13 league appearances in all competitions.

After retiring as a player he opened a barbers' shop in Preston, having originally trained as a barber at the age of 19.

== Career statistics ==
As of 25 February 2017

Club	Season	League		FA Cup		League Cup		Other		Total	
Club	Season	Apps	Goals	Apps	Goals	Apps	Goals	Apps	Goals	Apps	Goals
Bradford City	2009–10	39	4	1	0	1	0	2	0	43	4
Bradford City	2010–11	28	3	1	0	2	0	1	0	32	3
Bradford City	2011–12	1	0	1	0	1	0	0	0	3	0
Bradford City	2012–13	0	0	0	0	0	0	0	0	0	0
Bradford City	Total	68	7	3	0	4	0	3	0	78	7
Inverness Caledonian Thistle (loan)	2011–12	9	2	0	0	0	0	0	0	9	2
Barrow (loan)	2012–13	3	0	0	0	0	0	0	0	3	0
Macclesfield Town	2013–14	38	2	5	1	0	0	1	0	44	3
FC Halifax Town	2014–15	26	1	2	0	0	0	4	2	32	3
Barrow	2015–16	19	1	1	0	0	0	1	0	21	1
AFC Fylde	2016–17	21	7	0	0	0	0	1	0	22	7
Career total		184	20	11	1	4	0	10	2	210	23
