= Leon Osborne =

English footballer (born 1989)

Personal information
- Full name: Leon Aidan Osborne
- Date of birth: 28 October 1989 (age 37)
- Place of birth: Doncaster, England
- Position: Winger

Team information
- Current team: Maltby Main (assistant manager)

Youth career
- ?–2006: Bradford City

Senior career*
Years	Team	Apps	(Gls)
2006–2012	Bradford City	36	(1)
2011	→ Southport (loan)	1	(0)
2012	Harrogate Town	5	(0)
2012–2013	Stalybridge Celtic	3	(0)
2013	Buxton		
2013	Goole	1	(0)
2014	Frickley Athletic		
2014	Matlock		
2015	Rainworth Miners Welfare		
2015−2016	Farsley Celtic		
2016	Long Eaton United		
2016	Bradford Park Avenue	8	(0)
2016–2017	Brighouse Town		
2017	Hyde United	6	(2)
2017	Scarborough Athletic		
2017−2019	Ossett Albion		
2020–2021	Pickering Town		
2021	Rossington Main		
2021–2022	Goole		
2023–2024	Armthorpe Welfare		
2024	Maltby Main		
2024	Ossett United	8	(0)
2024	Pontefract Collieries	1	(0)
2024–2025	Brigg Town (dual-registered)	15	(1)
- * Club domestic league appearances and goals as of 16:55, 14 May 2025 (UTC)

Leon Aiden Osborne (born 28 October 1989) is an English professional footballer who plays as a winger. He played in the Football League with Bradford City. He is assistant manager of Maltby Main.

== Career ==
=== Bradford City ===
Born in Doncaster, Osborne made his league debut for Bradford City when he came on as substitute in the final 10 minutes of City's 2–2 draw with Millwall in the final game of the 2006–07 season.

Although still predominantly a member of the youth set-up at the Bantams, Osborne caused controversy when he insulted the club on his Bebo page. Osborne subsequently apologised for his misdemeanor and was reprimanded by the club and manager Stuart McCall, and remained at the club. McCall later said: "Leon's not a bad lad but just a bit of a kid at times. We all do silly things and he just needed to mature."

He did not play for the first team during the 2007–08 season, but was offered a new contract, and signed until the end of the year in May 2008. He earned a place on the bench for several games during the first few months of the 2008–09 season but did not make an appearance, until his first senior start for an FA Cup first-round game at Milton Keynes Dons in November 2008. His first league start came two weeks later in a 2–0 win against Rotherham United at the Don Valley Stadium when he was substituted during the second half.

==== Southport (loan) ====
He joined Southport on loan in August 2011.

=== Harrogate Town ===
After his release from Bradford he signed for Harrogate Town in August 2012.

=== Stalybridge Celtic ===
He then signed for Stalybridge Celtic.

=== Buxton ===
In the summer of 2013, he joined Buxton.

=== Goole ===
In December 2013 he played one match for Goole.

=== Frickley Athletic ===
After the game for Goole he moved to Frickley Athletic.

=== Matlock Town ===
He then joined Matlock Town

=== Rainworth Miners Welfare ===
He then had a spell at Rainworth Miners Welfare.

=== Farsley Celtic ===
In August he moved again, this time to Farsley Celtic.

=== Long Eaton ===
In June 2016 he joined Long Eaton United but did not remain at the club for long over the pre-season period.

=== Bradford Park Avenue ===
In summer 2016, after playing in virtually all of the club's pre-season matches as a trialist, he joined Bradford Park Avenue.

=== Brighouse Town ===
He then joined Brighouse Town at the end of September.

=== Hyde United ===
In March 2017 he joined Hyde United.

=== Scarborough Athletic ===
In May 2017 he joined Scarborough Athletic.

=== Pickering Town ===
Joined Pickering July 2020

=== Later career ===
In December 2024, he joined Pontefract Collieries.

On 21 December 2024, Osborne dual-registered with Brigg Town.

On 26 April 2025, Osborne was reported missing having last been seen leaving Doncaster train station on Saturday morning heading to Birmingham. On 1 May, it was confirmed that he had been found safe and well.

== Coaching career ==
In May 2025, Osborne returned to former club Maltby Main as assistant manager.
