= Leigh Franks =

English footballer

Personal information
- Full name: Leigh David Franks
- Date of birth: 7 March 1991 (age 35)
- Place of birth: Scarborough, England
- Position: Defender

Team information
- Current team: Scarborough Athletic

Youth career
- –2007: Bridlington Town
- 2007–2010: Huddersfield Town

Senior career*
Years	Team	Apps	(Gls)
2009–2011	Huddersfield Town	0	(0)
2009–2010	→ Fleetwood Town (loan)	?	(?)
2010–2011	→ Oxford United (loan)	5	(0)
2011–2013	Alfreton Town	52	(2)
2013–2015	Harrogate Town	34	(1)
2015–	Scarborough Athletic		
- * Club domestic league appearances and goals as of 05:11, 25 January 2017 (UTC)

Leigh David Franks (born 7 March 1991) is an English footballer who plays as a defender for Scarborough Athletic in the Northern Premier League Division One North.

== Career ==
Franks was signed up from Bridlington Town in 2007. In the 2009–10 season, he was sent on loan to Conference North side Fleetwood Town.

In the 2010–11 season, Huddersfield manager Lee Clark sent Franks out on loan to League Two side Oxford United for six months. He returned to the Galpharm on 5 January 2011. At the end of the season he was released by Huddersfield and in June 2011 he joined Alfreton Town. Despite an injury hit first season, Franks signed a new one-year contract with the club on 23 May 2012.

On 18 June 2013, Franks rejected a new contract offer from Alfreton and joined Harrogate Town. As he was under 24 and offered fresh terms, Alfreton received an undisclosed fee for the player.
