= 2009–10 Bradford City A.F.C. season =

Bradford City
2009–10 season
- Chairman: Mark Lawn; Julian Rhodes
- Manager: Stuart McCall (until 8 February 2010); Peter Taylor (from 17 February 2010)
- League Two: 14th
- FA Cup: 1st round
- League Cup: 1st round
- JPT Trophy: Semi-final (Northern Section)
- Top goalscorer: League: James Hanson (12); All: James Hanson (13)
- Highest home attendance: 12,403 vs Northampton Town (1 May 2010)
- Lowest home attendance: 3,701 vs Notts County (6 October 2009)
Home colours	Away colours

The 2009–10 season was the 107th season in Bradford City A.F.C.'s history, their 95th in The Football League and 97th in the league system of English football. Their ninth-place finish in 2008–09 meant this season would be their third successive season in League Two.

This article covers the period from 1 July 2009 to 30 June 2010.

== League data ==
=== League table ===
Pos	Team	Pld	W	D	L	GF	GA	GD	Pts
12	Shrewsbury Town	46	17	12	17	55	54	+1	63
13	Burton Albion	46	17	11	18	71	71	0	62
14	Bradford City	46	16	14	16	59	62	−3	62
15	Accrington Stanley	46	18	7	21	62	74	−12	61
16	Hereford United	46	17	8	21	54	65	−11	59

Updated to match(es) played on unknown. Source: football-league.co.uk

=== Results summary ===
Overall								Home						Away					
Pld	W	D	L	GF	GA	GD	Pts	W	D	L	GF	GA	GD	W	D	L	GF	GA	GD
46	16	14	16	59	62	−3	62	8	8	7	28	27	+1	8	6	9	31	35	−4

Last updated: 13 June 2010.
Source: Bradford City F.C.

=== Results by round ===
Round	1	2	3	4	5	6	7	8	9	10	11	12	13	14	15	16	17	18	19	20	21	22	23	24	25	26	27	28	29	30	31	32	33	34	35	36	37	38	39	40	41	42	43	44	45	46
Ground	A	H	H	A	H	A	H	A	H	A	A	H	A	H	A	H	H	A	H	A	H	H	H	A	A	A	H	H	A	A	H	A	A	A	H	A	H	H	A	H	A	H	H	A	H	A
Result	L	D	L	W	W	W	D	D	W	D	D	L	L	W	D	D	D	W	L	W	L	L	D	L	L	W	L	D	L	W	W	L	W	L	W	L	D	D	L	L	D	W	W	D	W	W

Updated to match(es) played on 8 May 2010. Source: Season Results
A = Away; H = Home; W = Win; D = Draw; L = Loss

== Season results ==
=== League Two ===
8 August 2009	Notts County	5–0	Bradford City	Meadow Lane
15:00	Davies 17'; Hughes 39'; Hughes 43'; Hughes 55' (pen.); Maloney 86'			Attendance: 9,396

15 August 2009	Bradford City	0–0	Port Vale	Valley Parade
15:00				Attendance: 11,333

18 August 2009	Bradford City	0–2	Lincoln City	Valley Parade
19:45			Howe 62' (pen.); Fagan 63'	Attendance: 11,242

22 August 2009	Cheltenham Town	4–5	Bradford City	Whaddon Road
15:00	Hammond 4'; Townsend 12'; Richards 43'; Richards 89'		J.O'Brien 2'; Evans 7'; Hanson 20'; Williams 50'; Ramsden 71'	Attendance: 3,073

29 August 2009	Bradford City	2–0	Torquay United	Valley Parade
15:00	Hanson 45+1'; Brandon 90+1'			Attendance: 11,123

5 September 2009	Shrewsbury Town	1–2	Bradford City	Greenhous Meadow
15:00	Hibbert 70'		Evans 16'; Flynn 35'	Attendance: 5,525

12 September 2009	Bradford City	1–1	Burton Albion	Valley Parade
15:00	Evans 24'		Boertien 74'	Attendance: 11,439

19 September 2009	Barnet	2–2	Bradford City	Underhill
15:00	O'Flynn 56'; Hughes 81'		Hanson 14'; Rehman 70'	Attendance: 2,282

26 September 2009	Bradford City	3–0	Chesterfield	Valley Parade
15:00	Flynn 23'; Neilson 55'; Brandon 86'			Attendance: 11,664

29 September 2009	Morecambe	0–0	Bradford City	Christie Park
19:45				Attendance: 3,116

3 October 2009	Northampton Town	2–2	Bradford City	Sixfields
15:00	Dyer 77'; Johnson 90'		Ramsden 54'; M.Boulding 54'	Attendance: 4,391

10 October 2009	Bradford City	2–3	Crewe Alexandra	Valley Parade
15:00	M.Boulding 44'; Hanson 69'		Zola 8'; Zola 23'; Schumacher 65'	Attendance: 11,757

17 October 2009	Dagenham & Redbridge	2–1	Bradford City	Victoria Road
15:00	Benson 8'; Ogogo 72'		Flynn 18'	Attendance: 2,446

24 October 2009	Bradford City	1–0	Hereford United	Valley Parade
15:00	Evans 41'			Attendance: 11,107

31 October 2009	Macclesfield Town	2–2	Bradford City	Moss Rose
15:00	Daniel 4'; Bencherif 41'		Hanson 58'; Williams 66'	Attendance: 1,578

14 November 2009	Bradford City	1–1	AFC Bournemouth	Valley Parade
15:00	Evans 42'		Pitman 33'	Attendance: 11,732

21 November 2009	Bradford City	1–1	Accrington Stanley	Valley Parade
15:00	Edwards 21' (o.g.)		Symes 56'	Attendance: 11,176

24 November 2009	Grimsby Town	0–3	Bradford City	Blundell Park
19:45			Whaley 24'; Williams 60'; Hanson 83'	Attendance: 3,646

1 December 2009	Bradford City	0–3	Rochdale	Valley Parade
19:45			Dagnall 12'; Dagnall 28'; O'Grady 58'	Attendance: 11,472

5 December 2009	Darlington	0–1	Bradford City	Darlington Arena
15:00			Williams 23'	Attendance: 2,744

12 December 2009	Bradford City	2–4	Rotherham United	Valley Parade
15:00	Bullock 19'; Flynn 46'		Ellison 30'; Ellison 37'; Roberts 78'; Broughton 88'	Attendance: 11,578

28 December 2009	Bradford City	1–3	Shrewsbury Town	Valley Parade
15:00	Hanson 20'		Dunfield 11'; McIntyre 45' (pen.); Hibbert 79'	Attendance: 11,522

2 January 2010	Bradford City	1–1	Cheltenham Town	Valley Parade
15:00	J.O'Brien 35'		Richards 45' (pen.)	Attendance: 11,522

19 January 2010	Bury	1–2	Bradford City	Gigg Lane
19:45	Jones 17'; Lowe 32' (pen.)		Boulding 23'	Attendance: 2,930

23 January 2010	Lincoln City	2–1	Bradford City	Sincil Bank
15:00	Herd 31' (pen.); Gilmour 37'		Boulding 62'	Attendance: 3,803

23 January 2010	Torquay United	1–2	Bradford City	Plainmoor
15:00	Robertson 15'		Evans 82'; Evans 90+3'	Attendance: 2,592

6 February 2010	Bradford City	0–1	Bury	Valley Parade
15:00			Morrell 52'	Attendance: 11,965

13 February 2010	Bradford City	0–0	Grimsby Town	Valley Parade
15:00				Attendance: 11,321

20 February 2010	Accrington Stanley	2–0	Bradford City	Crown Ground
15:00	Miles 54'; Miles 86'			Attendance: 3,396

23 February 2010	Rochdale	1–3	Bradford City	Spotland
19:45	Dagnall 45'		Clarke 10'; Threlfall 80'; Evans 87'

27 February 2010	Bradford City	1–0	Darlington	Valley Parade
15:00	Hanson 26'			Attendance: 11,532

2 March 2010	Aldershot Town	1–0	Bradford City	The EBB Stadium
19:45	Charles 54'			Attendance: 2,311

6 March 2010	Rotherham United	1–2	Bradford City	Don Valley Stadium
15:00	Le Fondre 90+2' (pen.)		Flynn 60'; Hanson 90+5'	Attendance: 4,185

9 March 2010	Port Vale	2–1	Bradford City	Vale Park
19:45	Richards 50'; Taylor 78'		Threlfall 12'	Attendance: 3,728

13 March 2010	Bradford City	2–1	Aldershot Town	Valley Parade
15:00	Hanson 14'; Daley 22'		Straker 12'	Attendance: 11,272

20 March 2010	Hereford United	2–0	Bradford City	Edgar Street
15:00	Mansett 33'; Jervis 81'			Attendance: 1,926

23 March 2010	Bradford City	0–0	Notts County	Valley Parade
19:45				Attendance: 11,630

27 March 2010	Bradford City	3–3	Dagenham & Redbridge	Valley Parade
19:45	Hanson 2'; Hanson 67'; Kendall 82'		Nurse 69'; Williams 75' (o.g.); Oliver 90+1' (o.g.)	Attendance: 11,064

3 April 2010	AFC Bournemouth	1–0	Bradford City	Dean Court
15:00	Pitman 41'			Attendance: 6,239

5 April 2010	Bradford City	1–2	Macclesfield Town	Valley Parade
15:00	Oliver 47'		Sinclair 40'; Wright 61'	Attendance: 11,395

10 April 2010	Burton Albion	1–1	Bradford City	Pirelli Stadium
15:00	Harrad 82'		Oliver 59'	Attendance: 2,648

13 April 2010	Bradford City	2–0	Morecambe	Valley Parade
19:45	Rehman 69'; Bolder 90+2'			Attendance: 11,027

17 April 2010	Bradford City	2–1	Barnet	Valley Parade
15:00	O'Brien 79'; Flynn 90+3'		Adomah 28'	Attendance: 11,138

24 April 2010	Chesterfield	1–1	Bradford City	Saltergate
15:00	Demontagnac 79'		Evans 75'	Attendance: 4,109

1 May 2010	Bradford City	2–0	Northampton Town	Valley Parade
15:00	Evans 12'; Evans 81'			Attendance: 12,403

8 May 2010	Crewe Alexandra	0–1	Bradford City	Alexandra Stadium
15:00			Kendall 67'	Attendance: 5,172

=== FA Cup ===
6 November 2009 Round 1	Notts County	2–1	Bradford City	Meadow Lane
19:45	Hawley 45+2'; Jackson 46'		Boulding 81'	Attendance: 4,213

=== League Cup ===
12 August 2009 Round 1	Nottingham Forest	3–0	Bradford City	City Ground
19:45	Anderson 46'; Blackstock 60'; McGugan 82'			Attendance: 4,639

=== JPT Trophy ===
1 September 2009 Round 1	Rochdale	1–2	Bradford City	Spotland
19:15	Dawson 59'		Flynn 74'; Neilson 79'	Attendance: 1,800

6 October 2009 Round 2	Bradford City	2–2 (3–2 p)	Notts County	Valley Parade
19:45	Boulding 20'; Brandon 90'		Westcarr 10'; Facey 85'	Attendance: 3,701
	Penalties
	Boulding (penalty missed); Thorne (penalty scored); Ramsden (penalty scored); J.O'Brien (penalty scored)		Westcarr (penalty scored); Ritchie (penalty scored); Facey (penalty missed); Bishop (penalty missed); Schmeichel (penalty missed)

10 November 2009 Quarter-Final	Bradford City	2–2 (5–4 p)	Port Vale	Valley Parade
19:45	Flynn 49'; Hanson 70'		McCombe 27'; R.Taylor 75'	Attendance: 5,096
	Penalties
	Flynn (penalty scored); J.O'Brien (penalty missed); Brandon (penalty missed); Hanson (penalty scored); L.O'Brien (penalty scored); Rehman (penalty scored); Williams (penalty scored)		Richards (penalty scored); Dodds (penalty missed); K.Taylor (penalty missed); Haldane (penalty scored); Fraser (penalty scored); R.Taylor (penalty scored); Yates (penalty missed)

15 December 2009 Semi-Final	Carlisle United	3–0	Bradford City	Brunton Park
19:30	Keogh 44'; Dobie 68'; Robson 74'			Attendance: 3,176

== Season summary ==
Stuart McCall resigned as manager during the season, leaving Peter Taylor to take over the team. Taylor produced good results, notably wins away to Rochdale and Rotherham United.

== See also ==
- 2009–10 in English football
- 2009–10 Football League
