= Ryan Harrison (footballer, born 1991) =

English footballer

Personal information
- Full name: Ryan Andrew Harrison
- Date of birth: 13 October 1991 (age 35)
- Place of birth: Leeds, England
- Height: 5 ft 10 in (1.78 m)
- Position: Winger

Youth career
- Bradford City

Senior career*
Years	Team	Apps	(Gls)
2009–2011	Bradford City	1	(0)
2010	→ Harrogate Railway Athletic (loan)	5	(2)
2011–2012	Stocksbridge Park Steels	14	(2)
2012	Ånge	11	(2)
2012	Ånge 2	1	(0)
2012–2013	Farsley	25	(5)
2013–2014	Ossett Albion	31	(7)
- * Club domestic league appearances and goals as of 17:00, 21 June 2011 (UTC)

Ryan Harrison (born 13 October 1991) is a former professional footballer who played as a winger. His only professional appearance came for Bradford City in 2010.

== Career ==
On 5 April 2010, Harrison made his professional debut in League Two as a substitute for Bradford City in a 2–1 loss to Macclesfield Town. In 2012, Harrison played for Swedish Division 3 side Ånge. He later played for Farsley and Ossett Albion. In August 2014, he suffered a serious knee injury while playing for Ossett Albion.
