= Chibuzor Chilaka =

Nigerian footballer (born 1986)

Personal information
- Full name: Chibuzor Chilaka
- Date of birth: 21 October 1986 (age 40)
- Place of birth: Nigeria
- Position: Forward

Team information
- Current team: Matlock Town

Youth career
- 2002–2004: Rushden & Diamonds
- 2004–2005: Notts County

Senior career*
Years	Team	Apps	(Gls)
2005–2006	Notts County	0	(0)
2005–2006	→ Hinckley United (loan)	2	(0)
2008–2009	Bridlington Town	31	(25)
2009–2010	Leeds Carnegie	29	(20)
2010–2011	Bradford City	4	(0)
2010	→ Bradford Park Avenue (loan)	1	(1)
2011	→ Harrogate Town (loan)	8	(3)
2011–2012	Braintree Town	25	(2)
2012–2013	Harrogate Town	47	(18)
2013–2016	Bradford Park Avenue	109	(38)
2016–2017	Harrogate Town	20	(1)
2017	→ Gainsborough Trinity (loan)	11	(1)
2017–2018	Shaw Lane	0	(0)
2018–2019	Hyde United	36	(12)
2019	Grantham Town	7	(2)
2019–	Matlock Town	22	(1)
- * Club domestic league appearances and goals as of 20:16, 14 February 2020 (UTC)

Chibuzor "Chib" Chilaka (born 21 October 1986) is a Nigerian footballer who plays as a forward for Matlock Town in the Northern Premier League.

== Career ==
Chilaka began his football career at Rushden & Diamonds in 2002, spending two years at the club's academy. In 2004, Chilaka joined Notts County after Notts County youth team coach Neville Hamilton had previously worked with the player at Rushden. He impressed during his year in the club's youth system, and subsequently signed a one-year professional contract on 4 July 2005. He made one first-team appearance for the club in the Football League Trophy 5–2 defeat at Northampton Town in October 2005. In December 2005, Chilaka joined Hinckley United on a three-month loan spell, playing two games for the club before Notts County recalled him on 10 January 2006. Chilaka was released by Notts County in May 2006.

He studied at the University of Hull, captaining and managing the team due to their ex-manager leaving. He also played for England Universities. Ahead of the 2007–08 season, Chilaka had a successful trial with Hull City but decided to finish his university course studying Human Biology. He played for Bridlington Town during the 2008–09 season, scoring a total of 38 goals for Bridlington in all competitions, 25 of which came in the league. During the following season, he played for Leeds Carnegie, where he scored 20 league goals in 29 appearances. He also won the club's Player of the Season award at the end of the 2009–10 campaign. Ahead of the 2010–11 season, Chilaka went on trial at Conference North side Guiseley, scoring twice in a friendly against Farsley. Guiseley manager Steve Kittrick was keen to sign Chilaka, but the player joined Bradford City on trial instead.

=== Bradford City ===
After a successful trial period, he was signed by Bradford City on non-contract terms. Chilaka made his debut for Bradford in the club's 2–1 League Cup defeat against Preston North End, coming on as a 79th-minute substitute in the match. He made his league debut for the club against Morecambe on 2 October 2010, again coming off the substitute's bench. After three appearances in league and cup matches, he was loaned to Bradford Park Avenue in November 2010 to gain match fitness. Chilaka scored on his debut for Bradford Park Avenue in the side's 3–1 win against Eccleshill United in the West Riding County Cup. However, Chilaka was ineligible to play in the match and Eccleshill were subsequently reinstated into the competition at Avenue's expense. He played his first league game on 11 December 2010, scoring the winning goal in the 93rd minute in the club's 3–2 away victory at Burscough, a game in which Avenue came from two goals down to win. Chilaka's loan spell at the club was disrupted by the snow throughout November and December 2010, resulting in a spate of postponements. This meant that he played just one league game for Bradford Park Avenue during his loan spell, scoring one goal.

In February 2011, Chilaka went out on loan again, this time to Conference North side Harrogate Town, making his debut in the club's 3–1 away win at Gainsborough Trinity. He scored a hat-trick in his final game before his loan spell ended as Harrogate ran out 3–0 winners against Gloucester City on 26 March. Chilaka played eight games for Harrogate, scoring three times. On his return to Bradford, he appeared as a second-half substitute in the club's 2–1 away loss to Stevenage. He was released by Bradford City on 10 May 2011, and signed for Braintree Town in August.

=== Harrogate Town ===
On 2 February 2012, Chilaka signed for Harrogate Town.

In 2013, Harrogate released Chilaka.

=== Bradford Park Avenue ===
Chilaka joined Bradford Park Avenue as a free agent on 5 July 2013.

== Personal life ==
His younger brother, Nduoma, is also a footballer, who has played for a number of non-League football clubs as well US University soccer team Regis Rangers (Regis University).
