= 2013–14 Hull City A.F.C. season =

English football club season

Hull City
2013–14 season
- Chairman: Assem Allam
- Manager: Steve Bruce
- Stadium: KC Stadium
- Premier League: 16th
- FA Cup: Runners-up
- League Cup: Fourth round
- Top goalscorer: League: Nikica Jelavić (4); Shane Long (4); All: Matty Fryatt (6)
- Highest home attendance: 24,940 (1 December vs Liverpool)
- Lowest home attendance: 21,949 (14 September vs Cardiff City)
- Average home league attendance: 24,116
Home colours	Away colours

The 2013–14 season was Hull City's first season back in the Premier League after automatic promotion as runner-up from the Championship in the 2012–13 season. They finished in 16th place, with their highest Premier League position and points total, to secure a further season in the Premier League. They also competed in the League Cup, reaching the 4th round. They also competed in the FA Cup, reaching their first ever final in the competition.

== Events ==
- George Boyd signed a two-year deal on 28 May 2013 to become a permanent member of the club from the start of the 2013–14 season when his contract with Peterborough United expired.
- Maynor Figueroa signed a two-year deal on 17 June 2013 to move to City on a free transfer as his contract at Wigan Athletic was up at the end of the 2012–13 season.
- The season's fixtures were announced on 19 June 2013 giving City an opening away tie against Chelsea on 17 August 2013. The season closes on 11 May 2014 with a home match against Everton.
- On 2 July 2013, Hull signed Scottish international goalkeeper Allan McGregor on a three-year contract from Turkish club Beşiktaş for a fee of £1.8 million.
- On 4 July 2013 goalkeeper Mark Oxley went on a season long loan to Football League One club Oldham Athletic, but was recalled on 27 March 2014 after Allan McGregor was dismissed for a second time and suffered kidney damage in the West Ham United match.
- On 8 July 2013, Paul McShane signed a new two-year deal with the club.
- On 15 July 2013, Hull signed goalkeeper Steve Harper, who was released by Newcastle United at the end of the 2012–13 season, on a one-year contract.
- On 16 July 2013, Jack Hobbs went out on loan to Nottingham Forest until the end of the 2013–14 season. Though on 24 January 2014, he was recalled by City to cover for an injury to James Chester sustained in the match against Norwich City.
- On 19 July 2013, striker Danny Graham was brought in on a season-long loan from Sunderland. Though the contract was terminated early and Graham moved on loan to Middlesbrough on transfer deadline day 31 January 2014.
- On 26 July 2013, the club announced the signing of Ivorian striker Yannick Sagbo from French side Evian Thonon Gaillard on a two-year contract for an undisclosed fee.
- On 1 August 2013, Tom Cairney went out on loan to Blackburn Rovers until January 2014.
- On 2 August 2013, Corry Evans moved to Blackburn Rovers for an undisclosed fee.
- On 9 August 2013, it was revealed that the club had been renamed Hull City Tigers Ltd.
- On 14 August 2013, the club made a double signing from Tottenham Hotspur. England International Tom Huddlestone signed a three-year contract for an undisclosed fee, while mid-fielder Jake Livermore joined on a season-long loan deal.
- The new squad number for the 2013–14 season were released on 16 August 2013.
- On transfer deadline day, 2 September 2013, Conor Townsend moved out on loan to Carlisle United until 29 September 2013, while Cameron Stewart moved on loan to Charlton Athletic until January 2014. Returning to City on a season-long loan is Gedo from Al-Ahly, though this was terminated early, on 16 January 2014, by the club.
- On 19 September 2013, the captain Robert Koren was ruled out for four to five weeks with foot injury.
- On 23 September 2013, Conor Henderson was signed following a trial at the club.
- On 26 September 2013, Conor Townsend's loan to Carlisle United was extended for two months.
- On 27 September 2013, Matty Fryatt went on a month-long loan to Sheffield Wednesday. The loan was later extended to 30 November 2013.
- On 1 October 2013, it was announced that Robbie Brady would be out of action for a month after undergoing a hernia operation. Following return. he experienced a groin injury that required further surgery, and in March 2014, it was announced that he would be out for the rest of the season.
- On 11 October 2013, goalkeeper Joe Cracknell was loaned to Scarborough Athletic to cover injury to Jason White.
- On 7 November 2013, it was reported that Sone Aluko would be out of action for up to ten weeks with an achilles injury after a problem during pre-match warm-up for the Sunderland match on 2 November 2013.
- On 21 November 2013, Aaron McLean went out on an emergency loan to Birmingham City until 1 January 2014.
- On 11 December 2013, it was reported that the club had formally asked The Football Association to change the club's name to Hull Tigers from the start of the 2014–15 season. On 15 January 2014, Assem Allam indicated he would leave the club "within 24-hours" if the name change was rejected by the FA. In March 2014, the FA membership committee advised that the name change be rejected. On 9 April 2014, the FA Council rejected the name change.
- On 2 January 2014, Tom Cairney signed a 3 1/2-year deal with Blackburn Rovers who he had been on loan to.
- On 3 January 2014, Sone Aluko signed a 2 1/2-year deal with the club.
- On 3 January 2014, Conor Townsend returned on loan to Carlisle United until the end of the season.
- On 7 January 2014, goalkeeper Eldin Jakupović went out on a month-long loan to Leyton Orient. But was recalled on 29 January 2014 to cover for Allan McGregor who was dismissed in the match against Crystal Palace the previous evening. On 13 February 2014, he returned to Leyton Orient on loan until 17 April 2014, but was again recalled on 27 March 2014 after Allan McGregor was dismissed for a second time and suffered kidney damage in the West Ham United match.
- On 9 January 2014, Cameron Stewart went on loan to Leeds United for an emergency 93-day loan ahead of a permanent move to the club when his contract expires.
- On 15 January 2014, Croatian striker Nikica Jelavić signed a three-and-a-half-year deal to join the club from Everton.
- On 16 January 2014, Aaron McLean signed a two-and-a-half-year deal with League One club Bradford City.
- On 17 January 2014, Shane Long signed a three-and-a-half-year deal to join the club from West Bromwich Albion for an undisclosed fee.
- On 23 January 2014, Nick Proschwitz went out on loan to Barnsley for the remainder of the season.
- On 23 January 2014, it was reported that an injury to James Chester sustained in the match against Norwich City on 18 January would leave him sidelined for up to six-weeks.
- On 31 January 2014, Jack Hobbs was sold to Nottingham Forest for an undisclosed fee on a four-and-a-half-year contract.
- On 27 March 2014, Conor Henderson went out on loan to Stevenage for the rest of the season.
- On 28 March 2014, it was reported that goalkeeper Allan McGregor remained in hospital after suffering kidney damage in the match against West Ham United on 26 March and was likely to miss the remainder of the season.
- On 1 April 2014, Yannick Sagbo and Benoît Assou-Ekotto, of Queens Park Rangers, were charged by the FA of improper conduct for social media posts about the quenelle gesture. The club have indicated they will vigorously defend Sagbo. On 22 April 2014, Sagbo was fined £15,000 but escaped a ban for the incident. Following an appeal by the FA, the player received a two-match ban for the incident on 12 June 2014.
- On 20 April 2014, at half-time in the home match against Arsenal, the club announced they had signed a four-year deal with kit suppliers Umbro.
- On 3 May 2014, it was confirmed that Hull City will enter the UEFA Europa League next season as FA Cup finalists, the club's first appearance on the European stage. They would start in the third qualifying round unless they win the FA Cup when they would progress straight to the group stages.
- On 23 May 2014, Steve Harper signed a new one-year deal with the club. It was also reported that Abdoulaye Faye and Robert Koren had been released by the club.
- On 10 June 2014, Matty Fryatt moved to Nottingham Forest on a free transfer.

== Squad ==
As of 27 March 2014

Note: Flags indicate national team as defined under FIFA eligibility rules; some limited exceptions apply. Players may hold more than one non-FIFA nationality.

No.	Pos.	Nation	Player
1	GK	SCO	Allan McGregor
2	DF	ENG	Liam Rosenior
3	DF	HON	Maynor Figueroa
4	DF	NIR	Alex Bruce
5	DF	WAL	James Chester
6	DF	ENG	Curtis Davies
7	MF	IRL	David Meyler
8	MF	ENG	Tom Huddlestone
10	MF	SLO	Robert Koren (captain)
11	MF	IRL	Robbie Brady
12	FW	ENG	Matty Fryatt
14	MF	ENG	Jake Livermore (on loan from Tottenham Hotspur)
15	DF	IRL	Paul McShane
16	GK	SUI	Eldin Jakupović

No.	Pos.	Nation	Player
17	FW	SCO	George Boyd
18	FW	CRO	Nikica Jelavić
19	DF	NIR	Joe Dudgeon
20	FW	CIV	Yannick Sagbo
21	FW	IRL	Shane Long
22	GK	ENG	Steve Harper
23	DF	SEN	Abdoulaye Faye
24	FW	NGR	Sone Aluko
27	MF	EGY	Ahmed Elmohamady
29	MF	IRL	Stephen Quinn
31	FW	AUS	Matthew Fletcher
32	FW	ANT	Calaum Jahraldo-Martin
—	GK	ENG	Mark Oxley
—	MF	NIR	Dougie Wilson

=== Out on loan ===
Note: Flags indicate national team as defined under FIFA eligibility rules; some limited exceptions apply. Players may hold more than one non-FIFA nationality.

No.	Pos.	Nation	Player
25	MF	ENG	Cameron Stewart (at Leeds United until the end of the 2013–14 Football League Championship season)
28	DF	ENG	Conor Townsend (at Carlisle United until the end of the 2013–14 Football League One season.)
30	MF	IRL	Conor Henderson (at Stevenage until the end of the 2013–14 Football League One season.)
33	FW	GER	Nick Proschwitz (at Barnsley until the end of the 2013–14 Football League Championship season)
—	GK	ENG	Joe Cracknell (at Scarborough Athletic)

== Pre-season ==
The first pre-season matches were announced on 9 May 2013. First to be announced would be an away game against Birmingham City on 27 July 2013. The Billy Bly Memorial Trophy match was set for 15 July 2013 at Church Road against North Ferriby United and an away match against Peterborough United was scheduled for 29 July. A fixture against Sheffield Wednesday on 20 July 2013 is to take place at Estadio Municipal de Albufeira as part of their training camp in Portugal. Three days later at the same ground a match against Portuguese side S.C. Braga will take place.

The squad reported back for pre-season training on 4 July 2013.

On 4 July 2013, a final pre-season match at the KC Stadium was announced against Spanish team Real Betis for 10 August 2013. The match would be a testimonial for Andy Dawson who would return to the club to appear in the fixture following his departure to Scunthorpe United.

On 16 July 2013, the team flew out to Portugal for a week-long pre-season training camp.

A further pre-season fixture was announced on 17 July 2013 against Dynamo Dresden on 3 August 2013 at the Glücksgas Stadium in Dresden, Germany.

The pre-season matches started on 15 July 2013 with two matches at the same time to allow for all the players to get a run-out. The first was the traditional Billy Bly Memorial Trophy match against North Ferriby United which City won 3–1. The second was against Winterton Rangers where City notched up a 6–0 victory.

In Portugal on 20 July 2013, the match against Sheffield Wednesday ended in a 0–0 draw. A further 0–0 draw against Braga on 23 July 2013 brought the Portugal training camp to a close.

Following return to England, an away match against Birmingham City on 27 July 2013 proved difficult, and Hull lost 2–1. This was followed on 29 July 2013 by another away match against Peterborough United, where Hull won 0–1.

On 2 August the team flew out to Germany for further training sessions ready for the two games there. City won the first match on 3 August 2013 against Dynamo Dresden, with Yannick Sagbo scoring the only goal of the game. The second match in Germany on 6 August 2013 against Eintracht Braunschweig ended in a 2–0 defeat.

They finished the pre-season games with a 3–0 home win against Real Betis in the Andy Dawson testimonial match.

15 July 2013	North Ferriby United	1–3	Hull City	Church Road, North Ferriby
19:30 BST	Jarman 65'	Report	Rosenior 14'; Proschwitz 42'; Quinn 90'	Stadium: Rapid Solicitors Stadium

15 July 2013	Winterton Rangers	0–6	Hull City	Winterton
19:30 BST		Report	Meyler 5'; Fryatt 7', 41', 51'; Evans 43'; Armstrong 47'	Stadium: West Street

20 July 2013	Hull City	0–0	Sheffield Wednesday	Portugal
20:00 BST		Report		Stadium: Estádio Municipal de Albufeira

23 July 2013	Hull City	0–0	Braga	Portugal
20:00 BST		Report		Stadium: Estádio Municipal de Albufeira

27 July 2013	Birmingham City	2–1	Hull City	Birmingham
15:00 BST	Green 12'; Shinnie 47'	Report	Aluko 75' (pen.)	Stadium: St Andrew's; Attendance: 5,252

29 July 2013	Peterborough United	0–1	Hull City	Peterborough
19:45 BST		Report	Figueroa 33'	Stadium: London Road Stadium

3 August 2013	Dynamo Dresden	0–1	Hull City	Dresden, Germany
15:00 BST		Report	Sagbo 14'	Stadium: Glücksgas Stadium; Attendance: 6,428

6 August 2013	Eintracht Braunschweig	2–0	Hull City	Goslar, Germany
17:00 BST	Ademi 53'; G. Korte 85'	Report		Stadium: S-Arena; Attendance: 1,500

10 August 2013	Hull City	3–0	Real Betis	Kingston upon Hull
15:00 BST	Graham 3'; Aluko 31'; Boyd 78'	Report		Stadium: KC Stadium; Attendance: 7,991; Referee: M. Jones

== Competition ==
=== Overall ===
Competition	Started round	Final position / round	First match	Last match
Premier League	—	16th	18 August 2013	11 May 2014
League Cup	2nd round	4th round	28 August 2013	30 October 2013
FA Cup	3rd round	Runner-up	4 January 2014	17 May 2014

Updated to match played 17 May 2014
Source: Competitions

=== Premier League ===
==== League table ====
Pos	Team	Pld	W	D	L	GF	GA	GD	Pts	Qualification or relegation
14	Sunderland	38	10	8	20	41	60	−19	38	
15	Aston Villa	38	10	8	20	39	61	−22	38	
16	Hull City	38	10	7	21	38	53	−15	37	Qualification for the Europa League third qualifying round (Note: Hull City qualified for the Europa League third qualifying round as runners-up of the 2013–14 FA Cup since winners Arsenal qualified for Champions League.)
17	West Bromwich Albion	38	7	15	16	43	59	−16	36	
18	Norwich City (R)	38	8	9	21	28	62	−34	33	Relegation to Football League Championship

Source: Barclays Premier League
Rules for classification: 1) Points; 2) Goal difference; 3) Goals scored; 4) Play-offs (only if needed to decide champion, teams for relegation or teams for UEFA competitions).
(R) Relegated

==== Results summary ====
Overall								Home						Away					
Pld	W	D	L	GF	GA	GD	Pts	W	D	L	GF	GA	GD	W	D	L	GF	GA	GD
38	10	7	21	38	53	−15	37	7	4	8	20	21	−1	3	3	13	18	32	−14

Last updated: 11 May 2014.
Source: Premier League

==== Results by matchday ====
Matchday	1	2	3	4	5	6	7	8	9	10	11	12	13	14	15	16	17	18	19	20	21	22	23	24	25	26	27	28	29	30	31	32	33	34	35	36	37	38
Ground	A	H	A	H	A	H	H	A	A	H	A	H	H	A	A	H	A	H	H	A	H	A	A	H	A	H	A	H	H	H	A	A	H	H	A	A	A	H
Result	L	W	L	D	W	W	D	L	L	W	L	L	W	L	D	D	D	L	W	L	L	L	L	D	W	L	W	L	L	W	L	L	W	L	D	L	L	L
Position	18	12	17	15	10	7	8	9	10	10	12	13	10	12	12	12	12	12	10	10	10	11	13	13	10	13	11	11	13	12	13	14	12	14	13	15	15	16

Updated to match(es) played on 11 May 2014. Source: Statto.com
A = Away; H = Home; W = Win; D = Draw; L = Loss

==== Matches ====
18 August 2013 1	Chelsea	2–0	Hull City	Chelsea, London
16:00 BST	Oscar 13'; Lampard 25'	Report	Meyler (yellow card) 40'	Stadium: Stamford Bridge; Attendance: 41,374; Referee: Jon Moss

24 August 2013 2	Hull City	1–0	Norwich City	Kingston upon Hull
15:00 BST	Brady 22' (pen.); Sagbo (red card) 27'; Livermore (yellow card) 76'	Report	Garrido (yellow card) 90+6'	Stadium: KC Stadium; Attendance: 23,682; Referee: Jones

31 August 2013 3	Manchester City	2–0	Hull City	Manchester
12:45 BST	Fernandinho (yellow card) 23'; Nastasić (yellow card) 60'; Negredo 65'; Touré 90'	Report	Figueroa (yellow card) 22'; Koren (yellow card) 63'; Davies (yellow card) 73'	Stadium: City of Manchester Stadium; Attendance: 46,903; Referee: Phil Dowd

14 September 2013 4	Hull City	1–1	Cardiff City	Kingston upon Hull
15:00 BST	Davies 40', (yellow card) 90+2'	Report	Campbell (yellow card) 20'; Turner (yellow card) 54'; Whittingham 59'	Stadium: KC Stadium; Attendance: 21,949; Referee: Bobby Madley

21 September 2013 5	Newcastle United	2–3	Hull City	Newcastle upon Tyne
15:00 BST	Rémy 10', 44'; Sissoko (yellow card) 90+5'	Report	Brady 26'; Elmohamady 48'; Aluko 76'; Huddlestone (yellow card) 90'	Stadium: St James' Park; Attendance: 51,523; Referee: M Atkinson

28 September 2013 6	Hull City	1–0	West Ham United	Kingston upon Hull
15:00 BST	Brady 12' (pen.); Graham (yellow card) 45+1'	Report	Nolan (yellow card) 8'; Morrison (yellow card) 73'	Stadium: KC Stadium; Attendance: 24,291; Referee: Kevin Friend

5 October 2013 7	Hull City	0–0	Aston Villa	Kingston upon Hull
15:00 BST	Rosenior (yellow card) 34'; Davies (yellow card) 44'	Report	Westwood (yellow card) 35'	Stadium: KC Stadium; Attendance: 24,396; Referee: Mark Clattenburg

19 October 2013 8	Everton	2–1	Hull City	Walton, Liverpool
15:00 BST	Barry 8', (yellow card) 29'; Osman (yellow card) 55'; Pienaar 57'	Report	Sagbo 30'; Huddlestone (yellow card) 90+1'	Stadium: Goodison Park; Attendance: 38,828; Referee: Neil Swarbrick

27 October 2013 9	Tottenham Hotspur	1–0	Hull City	Tottenham, London
16:00 GMT	Sandro (yellow card) 17'; Chiricheș (yellow card) 59'; Soldado 80' (pen.); Eriksen (yellow card) 90'	Report	Rosenior (yellow card) 39'; Boyd (yellow card) 72'; Meyler (yellow card) 77'	Stadium: White Hart Lane; Attendance: 36,080; Referee: Michael Oliver

2 November 2013 10	Hull City	1–0	Sunderland	Kingston upon Hull
15:00 GMT	Cuéllar 25' (o.g.); Brady (yellow card) 88'; Figueroa (yellow card) 90'	Report	Cattermole (red card) 45+2'; Dossena (red card) 45+6'	Stadium: KC Stadium; Attendance: 24,677; Referee: Andre Marriner; Man of the Match: Jake Livermore

9 November 2013 11	Southampton	4–1	Hull City	Southampton
15:00 GMT	Schneiderlin 16'; Lambert 30' (pen.); Lallana 37'; Schneiderlin (yellow card) 79'; Davis 88'	Report	Harper (yellow card) 29'; Davies (yellow card) 44'; Sagbo 55'	Stadium: St Mary's Stadium; Attendance: 30,022; Referee: Phil Dowd

23 November 2013 12	Hull City	0–1	Crystal Palace	Kingston upon Hull
15:00 GMT	Elmohamady (yellow card) 45+3'; Huddlestone (yellow card) 66'	Report	Dikgacoi (yellow card) 54'; Bolasie (red card) 78'; Bannan 81'	Stadium: KC Stadium; Attendance: 23,043; Referee: Anthony Taylor

1 December 2013 13	Hull City	3–1	Liverpool	Kingston upon Hull
14:05 GMT	Livermore 20'; Davies (yellow card) 25'; Brady (yellow card) 44'; Meyler 72'; Škrtel 87' (o.g.)	Report	Gerrard 27'	Stadium: KC Stadium; Attendance: 24,940; Referee: Howard Webb

4 December 2013 14	Arsenal	2–0	Hull City	Holloway, London
19:45 GMT	Bendtner 2'; Özil 47'	Report		Stadium: Emirates Stadium; Attendance: 60,017; Referee: Andre Marriner

9 December 2013 15	Swansea City	1–1	Hull City	Swansea
20:00 GMT	Chico 60', (yellow card) 83'; Williams (yellow card) 80'; Shelvey (yellow card) 80'	Report	Graham 9'; Livermore (yellow card) 41'; Figueroa (yellow card) 78'; Sagbo (yellow card) 80'	Stadium: Liberty Stadium; Attendance: 19,303; Referee: Martin Atkinson

14 December 2013 16	Hull City	0–0	Stoke City	Kingston upon Hull
17:30 GMT	Sagbo (yellow card) 59'	Report		Stadium: KC Stadium; Attendance: 23,324; Referee: Mike Dean

21 December 2013 17	West Bromwich Albion	1–1	Hull City	West Bromwich
15:00 GMT	Jones (yellow card) 65'; Vydra 86'; Gera (yellow card) 88'	Report	Livermore 28'; Meyler (yellow card) 40'	Stadium: The Hawthorns; Attendance: 24,753; Referee: Jonathan Moss

26 December 2013 18	Hull City	2–3	Manchester United	Kingston upon Hull
12:45 GMT	Chester 4'; Meyler 13'; Figueroa (yellow card) 19'; Bruce (yellow card) 72'	Report	Smalling 19'; Rooney 26', (yellow card) 73'; Januzaj (yellow card) 34'; Valencia (yellow card) 61' (yellow-red card) 90'; Chester 66' (o.g.)	Stadium: KC Stadium; Attendance: 24,826; Referee: Michael Oliver

28 December 2013 19	Hull City	6–0	Fulham	Kingston upon Hull
15:00 GMT	Elmohamady 49'; Koren 60', 84'; Boyd 63'; Huddlestone 67' (Note: Tom Huddlestone had been growing his hair to raise money for charity since his previous goal for Tottenham in April 2011. On getting his hair cut he had raised more than £36,000 for Cancer Research.); Fryatt 74'	Report		Stadium: KC Stadium; Attendance: 23,925; Referee: Robert Madley

1 January 2014 20	Liverpool	2–0	Hull City	Liverpool
15:00 GMT	Agger 36'; Suárez (yellow card) 39', (goal) 50'	Report	Bruce (yellow card) 21'; Davies (yellow card) 86'	Stadium: Anfield; Attendance: 44,627; Referee: Craig Pawson

11 January 2014 21	Hull City	0–2	Chelsea	Kingston upon Hull
12:45 GMT	Livermore (yellow card) 69'; Figueroa (yellow card) 82'	Report	Hazard 56'; Cahill (yellow card) 66'; Torres 87'	Stadium: KC Stadium; Attendance: 24,924; Referee: Mark Clattenburg

18 January 2014 22	Norwich City	1–0	Hull City	Norwich
15:00 GMT	Johnson (yellow card) 45+4'; Bennett 87'	Report	Figueroa (yellow card) 39'; Rosenior (yellow card) 49'; Huddlestone (yellow card) 52', (yellow card) 89' (yellow-red card)	Stadium: Carrow Road; Attendance: 26,655; Referee: Howard Webb

28 January 2014 23	Crystal Palace	1–0	Hull City	Selhurst, London
20:00 GMT	Puncheon 16'; Delaney (yellow card) 22'; Chamakh (yellow card) 63'; Jerome (yellow card) 83'; O'Keefe (yellow card) 90+1'	Report	McGregor (red card) 90+2'	Stadium: Selhurst Park; Attendance: 22,519; Referee: Roger East

1 February 2014 24	Hull City	1–1	Tottenham Hotspur	Kingston upon Hull
15:00 GMT	Long 12'; Meyler (yellow card) 75'	Report	Paulinho 61'; Soldado (yellow card) 90+2'	Stadium: KC Stadium; Attendance: 24,932; Referee: Anthony Taylor

8 February 2014 25	Sunderland	0–2	Hull City	Sunderland
15:00 GMT	Brown (red card) 4'; Bridcutt (yellow card) 45+2'	Report	Rosenior (yellow card) 11'; Long 16'; Livermore (yellow card) 41'; Jelavić (yellow card) 61', (goal) 62'	Stadium: Stadium of Light; Attendance: 42,810; Referee: Michael Jones

11 February 2014 26	Hull City	0–1	Southampton	Kingston upon Hull
19:45 GMT		Report	Shaw (yellow card) 45+2'; Fonte (yellow card) 48', (goal) 69'; Schneiderlin (yellow card) 82'	Stadium: KC Stadium; Attendance: 23,670; Referee: Martin Atkinson

22 February 2014 27	Cardiff City	0–4	Hull City	Cardiff
15:00 GMT	Zaha (yellow card) 33'	Report	Huddlestone 18'; Jelavić 38', 57'; Livermore 67'; Boyd (yellow card) 86'	Stadium: Cardiff City Stadium; Attendance: 26,167; Referee: Howard Webb

1 March 2014 28	Hull City	1–4	Newcastle United	Kingston upon Hull
15:00 GMT	Davies 46'; Jelavić (yellow card) 53'; Meyler (yellow card) 72'; Huddlestone (yellow card) 81'	Report	Sissoko 10', 55'; Tioté (yellow card) 29'; Yanga-Mbiwa (yellow card) 35'; Rémy 42'; Pardew (red card) 72' (Note: Newcastle United's manager Alan Pardew was issued with a red card by referee Kevin Friend for head-butting David Meyler. Pardew later apologised for the incident, but Newcastle issued him with a formal warning and a £100,000 fine. On 3 March 2014, The Football Association charged Pardew with improper conduct to which he later admitted. Purdew was given a three-match stadium ban to be followed by a four-match touchline ban and a £60,000 fine for the incident.); Anita 90+3'	Stadium: KC Stadium; Attendance: 24,903; Referee: Kevin Friend

15 March 2014 29	Hull City	0–2	Manchester City	Kingston upon Hull
12:45 GMT	Elmohamady (yellow card) 34'; Rosenior (yellow card) 70'; Boyd (Note: Following video review of the match by an FA panel George Boyd was charged with misconduct for allegedly spitting at Joe Hart. A panel found the case proved and Boyd served an immediate three-match ban for the incident.)	Report	Kompany (red card) 10'; Silva 14'; Zabaleta (yellow card) 55'; Hart (yellow card) 69'; Džeko 90'	Stadium: KC Stadium; Attendance: 24,895; Referee: Lee Mason

22 March 2014 30	Hull City	2–0	West Bromwich Albion	Kingston upon Hull
15:00 GMT	Rosenior 31'; Long 38'; Aluko (yellow card) 58'; Meyler (yellow card) 72'	Report		Stadium: KC Stadium; Attendance: 23,486; Referee: Chris Foy

26 March 2014 31	West Ham United	2–1	Hull City	Upton Park, London
19:54 GMT	Noble 26' (pen.); Chester 54' (o.g.)	Report	Livermore (yellow card) 18'; McGregor (red card) 23' (Note: The red-card was later rescinded by an independent regulatory commission.); Huddlestone 48' (Note: The goal is attributed to Jelavić in some sources and the BBC match report indicates both at different points in the text.)	Stadium: Boleyn Ground; Attendance: 31,033; Referee: Mike Dean

29 March 2014 32	Stoke City	1–0	Hull City	Stoke-on-Trent
15:00 GMT	Odemwingie 62', (yellow card) 62'; Palacios (yellow card) 85'	Report		Stadium: Britannia Stadium; Attendance: 27,029; Referee: Neil Swarbrick

5 April 2014 33	Hull City	1–0	Swansea City	Kingston upon Hull
15:00 BST	Boyd 39'	Report	Shelvey (yellow card) 41'; Hernández (yellow card) 74'	Stadium: KC Stadium; Attendance: 22,744; Referee: Howard Webb

20 April 2014 34	Hull City	0–3	Arsenal	Kingston upon Hull
14:05 BST	Meyler (yellow card) 16'	Report	Mertesacker (yellow card) 14'; Ramsey 31'; Podolski 45', 54'	Stadium: KC Stadium; Attendance: 24,762; Referee: Jonathan Moss

26 April 2014 35	Fulham	2–2	Hull City	Fulham, London
15:00 BST	Dejagah 55'; Amorebieta 58'; Diarra (yellow card) 65'	Report	Elmohamady (yellow card) 16'; Jelavić (yellow card) 21', (goal) 75'; Livermore (yellow card) 45'; Long 87'	Stadium: Craven Cottage; Attendance: 25,700; Referee: Lee Mason

3 May 2014 36	Aston Villa	3–1	Hull City	Witton, Birmingham
15:00 BST	Westwood 1'; Weimann 41', 45+3'	Report	Bowery 28' (o.g.)	Stadium: Villa Park; Attendance: 37,182; Referee: Mike Dean

6 May 2014 37	Manchester United	3–1	Hull City	Old Trafford, Manchester
19:45 BST	Wilson 31', 61'; Fellaini (yellow card) 38'; Van Persie 86'	Report	Meyler (yellow card) 46'; Fryatt 63'	Stadium: Old Trafford; Attendance: 75,341; Referee: Craig Pawson

11 May 2014 38	Hull City	0–2	Everton	Kingston upon Hull
15:00 BST		Report	McCarthy 9'; Jagielka (yellow card) 23'; Lukaku 46'	Stadium: KC Stadium; Attendance: 24,848; Referee: Howard Webb

=== League Cup ===
Hull City enter the competition in Round Two, the draw for this took place on 8 August 2013 and Hull were drawn away to League One club Leyton Orient. Hull travelled to Orient on 27 August 2013 and drew the match 0–0. Extra-time was required and in the second-half substitute Robbie Brady broke the dead-lock with the only goal of the match soon after coming on to the pitch. The following day, the draw for the third round took place and City were drawn at home to local side Huddersfield Town of the Championship. The match was arranged for 24 September 2013. Nick Proschwitz scored the only goal in a 1–0 win to put Hull through to the fourth round of the cup. The draw for the 4th round took place the following day and set-up an all Premier League match with Tottenham Hotspur. The match will take place at White Hart Lane on 30 October, three days after the Premier League game between the teams. Following a 1–1 draw at full-time, extra time was played with both sides scoring a further goal. The match was determined by a penalty shoot-out, which City lost 8–7 when Ahmed Elmohamady's shot was saved by Brad Friedel.

27 August 2013 2	Leyton Orient	0–1 (a.e.t.)	Hull City	Leyton, London
19:45 BST		Report	Townsend (yellow card) 92'; Jahraldo-Martin (yellow card) 93'; Brady 107'	Stadium: Matchroom Stadium; Attendance: 3,181; Referee: Gavin Ward

24 September 2013 3	Hull City	1–0	Huddersfield Town	Kingston upon Hull
19:45 BST	Proschwitz 59'; Faye (yellow card) 68'	Report	Woods (yellow card) 39'	Stadium: KC Stadium; Attendance: 7,151; Referee: S Hooper

30 October 2013 4	Tottenham Hotspur	2–2 (a.e.t.) (8–7 p)	Hull City	Tottenham, London
19:45 GMT	Sigurðsson 16'; Defoe (yellow card) 76'; Kane 107'	Report	Friedel 53' (o.g.); McShane 99'	Stadium: White Hart Lane; Attendance: 35,617; Referee: Jonathan Moss
	Penalties
	Sigurðsson (penalty scored); Defoe (penalty scored); Vertonghen (penalty scored); Lamela (penalty missed); Kane (penalty scored); Paulinho (penalty scored); Kaboul (penalty scored); Dembélé (penalty scored); Walker (penalty scored)		McLean (penalty missed); Quinn (penalty scored); Boyd (penalty scored); Gedo (penalty scored); Proschwitz (penalty scored); Meyler (penalty scored); Rosenior (penalty scored); McShane (penalty scored); Elmohamady (penalty missed)

=== FA Cup ===
Hull City enter the competition at the third round proper stage with matches taking place in early January 2014. The draw for the third round took place on 8 December 2013 and Hull were drawn away to Football League Championship side Middlesbrough. The match took place on 4 January 2014 at the Riverside Stadium and Hull won the match 2–0 with goals by Aaron McLean and Nick Proschwitz. The draw for the fourth round took place on 5 January 2014 and Hull were drawn away to League Two team Southend United to face former manager Phil Brown for the first time since he left the club. The match took place on 25 January 2014 at Roots Hall with City leaving it until the second half to break the deadlock when Matty Fryatt scored both goals to take the visitors into the next round. The draw for the fifth round took place on 26 January 2014 and Hull were drawn away to Championship side Brighton & Hove Albion. The match was selected for live TV coverage by BT Sport and set to take place on 17 February 2014. The draw for the quarter-finals took place on 16 February and if Hull beat Brighton & Hove Albion they were drawn at home to Sunderland with match taking place on 8 or 9 March 2014. The fifth-round match took place at the Falmer Stadium on 17 February 2014 with Brighton & Hove taking the lead through a Leonardo Ulloa goal in the first half. The visitors levelled the game after 85 minutes when Yannick Sagbo hit the target. The score remained at 1–1 and a replay would be required to see who progressed. The replay was scheduled to take place on 24 February 2014 to avoid clashes with UEFA Champions League matches, which both managers criticised, as it is just 48-hours after important league matches for both teams. Hull started the replay with first-half goals by Sone Aluko and Robert Koren, with Leonardo Ulloa scoring a second-half goal for Brighton. Hull went through to the next round with a 2–1 win in the replay. The next-round match was selected for televising by ITV and was set to take place on Sunday 9 March. The match took place in bright sunshine at the KC Stadium and both teams struggled in the first half to make any impact. A penalty was conceded by Sebastian Larsson of Sunderland but Sone Aluko's shot was saved by Oscar Ustari, leaving the match goalless at half-time. In the second-half Hull took the match with three goals in ten minutes by Curtis Davies, David Meyler and Matty Fryatt.

The draw for the semi-final took place immediately after the conclusion of the match and Hull were drawn first and paired with local Yorkshire side Sheffield United. Matches to take place over the weekend of 12 and 13 April 2014 at Wembley Stadium. Hull's match was subsequently set for 13 April at 16:00. Though the kick-off time was later revised to 16:07 to mark the 25th anniversary of the Hillsborough disaster. On 2 April Andre Marriner was announced as the match referee.

In the semi-final match Sheffield United started the better of the teams and took the lead with a Jose Baxter goal. Hull levelled the score just before half-time through Yannick Sagbo, but Sheffield were quickly back in front when Stefan Scougall struck to leave city 2–1 behind at the break. City made two changes at half-time bringing on Matty Fryatt, for George Boyd, and Sone Aluko, for Maynor Figueroa. Matty Fryatt made an instant impact scoring the next goal with Tom Huddlestone and Stephen Quinn giving city the lead. Jamie Murphy pegged one back for Sheffield at the end of normal time but city sealed it with a David Meyler goal in added time. Giving Hull a 5–3 win and a first appearance in an FA Cup Final in their history.

The final against Arsenal took place at Wembley Stadium on 17 May 2014 with a kick-off time of 17:00, exactly the same time as the Magic Weekend rugby league match between Hull F.C. and Hull Kingston Rovers. The match referee was Lee Probert. In bright sunshine Hull took an early lead through James Chester and followed it by captain Curtis Davies netting after 8 minutes. Arsenal pulled one back through Santi Cazorla but it took until the second half for Arsenal to level through Laurent Koscielny. The game went to extra-time and the only goal came in the second-half through Aaron Ramsey giving Arsenal a 3–2 victory.

4 January 2014 Third	Middlesbrough	0–2	Hull City	Middlesbrough
15:00 GMT	Williams (yellow card) 24'; Leadbitter (yellow card) 83'	Report	McLean 10'; Proschwitz 61'	Stadium: Riverside Stadium; Attendance: 15,571; Referee: Kevin Friend

25 January 2014 Fourth	Southend United	0–2	Hull City	Southend-on-Sea
15:00 GMT	Corr (yellow card) 4'; Thompson (yellow card) 41'; Woodrow (yellow card) 87'	Report	Faye (yellow card) 23'; Rosenior (yellow card) 48'; Fryatt 63', 90+1'	Stadium: Roots Hall; Attendance: 10,250; Referee: Lee Mason

17 February 2014 Fifth	Brighton & Hove Albion	1–1	Hull City	Falmer, East Sussex
19:45 GMT	Ulloa 30'; Chicksen (yellow card) 62'	Report	Aluko (yellow card) 37'; Koren (yellow card) 57'; Sagbo 85'	Stadium: Falmer Stadium; Attendance: 21,352; Referee: Lee Probert

24 February 2014 Fifth replay	Hull City	2–1	Brighton & Hove Albion	Kingston upon Hull
19:45 GMT	Davies 14'; Koren 36'; Sagbo (yellow card) 77'	Report	Ulloa 68'; LuaLua (yellow card) 90+1'	Stadium: KC Stadium; Attendance: 10,795; Referee: Andre Marriner

9 March 2014 Sixth	Hull City	3–0	Sunderland	Kingston upon Hull
14:00 GMT	Huddlestone (yellow card) 15'; Davies 68'; Meyler 72'; Fryatt 77'	Report	Cattermole (yellow card) 30'; Scocco (yellow card) 60'	Stadium: KC Stadium; Attendance: 20,047; Referee: Craig Pawson

13 April 2014 Semi-final	Hull City	5–3	Sheffield United	Wembley Park, London
16:07 BST	Meyler (yellow card) 14'; Sagbo 42'; Fryatt 49'; Huddlestone 54'; Quinn 67'; Meyler 90+3'	Report	Baxter 19'; Scougall 44'; Murphy 90'	Stadium: Wembley Stadium; Attendance: 71,820; Referee: Andre Marriner

17 May 2014 Final	Arsenal	3–2 (a.e.t.)	Hull City	Wembley Park, London
17:00 BST	Cazorla 17'; Koscielny 71'; Giroud (yellow card) 85'; Ramsey 109'	Report	Chester 4'; Davies 8'; Huddlestone (yellow card) 60'; Meyler (yellow card) 70'; Davies (yellow card) 86'	Stadium: Wembley Stadium; Attendance: 89,345; Referee: Lee Probert

== Statistics ==
=== Captains ===
No.	P	Name	Country	No. games	Notes
10	MF	Robert Koren	(Slovenia)	9	Club captain
6	MF	Curtis Davies	(England)	34	Vice captain
23	DF	Abdoulaye Faye	(Senegal)	3	
8	MF	Tom Huddlestone	(England)	1	

Last updated: 17 May 2014
Source: Competitive match reports.
Competitive matches only
Matches started as captain only
Country: FIFA nationality; No.: Squad number; P: Position; Name: Player name; No. Games: Number of games started as captain.

=== Appearances ===
As of 17 May 2014

Appearances shown after a "+" indicate player came on during course of the match

No.	Pos	Nat	Player	Total		Premier League		FA Cup		League Cup	
No.	Pos	Nat	Player	Apps	Goals	Apps	Goals	Apps	Goals	Apps	Goals
1	GK	(Scotland) SCO	Allan McGregor	29	0	26	0	3	0	0	0
2	DF	(England) ENG	Liam Rosenior	37	1	22+7	1	5	0	3	0
3	DF	(Honduras) HON	Maynor Figueroa	38	0	31+1	0	6	0	0	0
4	DF	(Northern Ireland) NIR	Alex Bruce	25	0	19+1	0	1+1	0	3	0
5	DF	(Wales) WAL	James Chester	29	2	22+2	1	4+1	1	0	0
6	DF	(England) ENG	Curtis Davies	43	5	37	2	5	3	1	0
7	MF	(Republic of Ireland) IRL	David Meyler	40	4	27+3	2	6+1	2	3	0
8	MF	(England) ENG	Tom Huddlestone	40	4	35+1	3	4	1	0	0
9	FW	(England) ENG	Danny Graham	20	1	12+6	1	1	0	1	0
10	MF	(Slovenia) SLO	Robert Koren	26	3	10+12	2	2+1	1	1	0
11	MF	(Republic of Ireland) IRL	Robbie Brady	18	4	11+5	3	0+1	0	0+1	1
12	FW	(England) ENG	Matty Fryatt	18	6	0+10	2	4+2	4	2	0
14	MF	(England) ENG	Jake Livermore	41	3	34+2	3	4+1	0	0	0
15	DF	(Republic of Ireland) IRL	Paul McShane	15	1	9+1	0	2+1	0	2	1
16	GK	(Switzerland) SUI	Eldin Jakupović	2	0	1	0	0	0	1	0
17	FW	(Scotland) SCO	George Boyd	39	2	9+20	2	3+4	0	3	0
18	FW	(Egypt) EGY	Gedo	5	0	0+2	0	1	0	0+2	0
18	FW	(Croatia) CRO	Nikica Jelavić	16	4	16	4	0	0	0	0
19	DF	(Northern Ireland) NIR	Joe Dudgeon	2	0	0	0	0	0	2	0
20	FW	(Ivory Coast) CIV	Yannick Sagbo	34	4	16+12	2	5	2	1	0
21	FW	(England) ENG	Aaron McLean	4	1	0+1	0	1	1	1+1	0
21	FW	(Republic of Ireland) IRL	Shane Long	15	4	15	4	0	0	0	0
22	GK	(England) ENG	Steve Harper	19	0	11+2	0	4	0	2	0
23	DF	(Senegal) SEN	Abdoulaye Faye	7	0	3	0	3	0	1	0
24	FW	(Nigeria) NGR	Sone Aluko	22	1	10+7	1	3+2	0	0	0
25	MF	(England) ENG	Cameron Stewart	1	0	0	0	0	0	1	0
27	MF	(Egypt) EGY	Ahmed Elmohamady	45	2	38	2	5+1	0	1	0
28	DF	(England) ENG	Conor Townsend	1	0	0	0	0	0	0+1	0
29	MF	(Republic of Ireland) IRL	Stephen Quinn	24	1	4+11	0	4+3	1	2	0
30	MF	(Republic of Ireland) IRL	Conor Henderson	1	0	0	0	0	0	0+1	0
32	MF	(Antigua and Barbuda) ANT	Calaum Jahraldo-Martin	2	0	0	0	0+1	0	0+1	0
33	MF	(Germany) GER	Nick Proschwitz	5	2	0+2	0	1	1	2	1
—	GK	(England) ENG	Joe Cracknell	0	0	0	0	0	0	0	0
—	MF	(Northern Ireland) NIR	Dougie Wilson	0	0	0	0	0	0	0	0

=== Top scorers ===
As of 17 May 2014

Player	Number	Position	Premier League	FA Cup	League Cup	Total
Matty Fryatt	12	FW	2	4	0	6
Curtis Davies	6	DF	2	3	0	5
Robbie Brady	11	MF	3	0	1	4
Tom Huddlestone	8	MF	3	1	0	4
Nikica Jelavić	18	FW	4	0	0	4
David Meyler	7	MF	2	2	0	4
Shane Long	21	FW	4	0	0	4
Yannick Sagbo	20	FW	2	2	0	4
Robert Koren	10	MF	2	1	0	3
Jake Livermore	14	MF	3	0	0	3
George Boyd	17	FW	2	0	0	2
James Chester	5	DF	1	1	0	2
Ahmed Elmohamady	27	MF	2	0	0	2
Nick Proschwitz	23	FW	0	1	1	2
Sone Aluko	24	FW	1	0	0	1
Danny Graham	9	FW	1	0	0	1
Aaron McLean	21	FW	0	1	0	1
Paul McShane	15	DF	0	0	1	1
Stephen Quinn	29	MF	0	1	0	1
Liam Rosenior	2	DF	1	0	0	1
Total			35	17	3	55

=== Disciplinary record ===
As of 17 May 2014

Player	Number	Position	Premier League		FA Cup		League Cup		Total	
Player	Number	Position	Yellow card	Red card	Yellow card	Red card	Yellow card	Red card	Yellow card	Red card
Tom Huddlestone	8	MF	6	1	2	0	0	0	8	1
Yannick Sagbo	20	FW	0	1	1	0	0	0	1	1
Allan McGregor	1	GK	0	1 (Note: This does not include the red-card issued on 26 March 2014 in the game against West Ham United as this was later rescinded by an independent regulatory commission.)	0	0	0	0	0	1
David Meyler	7	MF	8	0	2	0	0	0	10	0
Curtis Davies	6	DF	6	0	1	0	0	0	7	0
Maynor Figueroa	3	DF	6	0	0	0	0	0	6	0
Jake Livermore	14	MF	6	0	0	0	0	0	6	0
Liam Rosenior	2	DF	5	0	1	0	0	0	6	0
Alex Bruce	4	DF	2	0	0	0	1	0	3	0
Ahmed Elmohamady	27	MF	3	0	0	0	0	0	3	0
Nikica Jelavić	18	FW	3	0	0	0	0	0	3	0
Sone Aluko	24	FW	1	0	1	0	0	0	2	0
George Boyd	17	FW	2	0	0	0	0	0	2	0
Robbie Brady	11	MF	2	0	0	0	0	0	2	0
Abdoulaye Faye	23	DF	0	0	1	0	1	0	2	0
Robert Koren	10	FW	1	0	1	0	0	0	2	0
Danny Graham	9	FW	1	0	0	0	0	0	1	0
Steve Harper	22	GK	1	0	0	0	0	0	1	0
Yannick Sagbo	20	FW	1	0	0	0	0	0	1	0
Conor Townsend	28	DF	0	0	0	0	1	0	1	0
Total			54	3	10	0	3	0	67	3

== Transfers ==
This section only lists transfers and loans for the 2013–14 season, which began 1 July 2013. For transactions in May and June 2013, see transfers and loans for the 2012–13 season.

=== Players in ===
Date	Player	From	Fee	Ref
1 July 2013	(Scotland) George Boyd	(England) Peterborough United	Free	
1 July 2013	(Honduras) Maynor Figueroa	(England) Wigan Athletic	Free	
2 July 2013	(Scotland) Allan McGregor	(Turkey) Beşiktaş	£1.8 million	
15 July 2013	(England) Steve Harper	(England) Newcastle United	Free	
26 July 2013	(Ivory Coast) Yannick Sagbo	(France) Evian TG	Undisclosed	
14 August 2013	(England) Tom Huddlestone	(England) Tottenham Hotspur	Undisclosed (around £5 million)	
24 September 2013	(Republic of Ireland) Conor Henderson	(England) Arsenal	Free	
15 January 2014	(Croatia) Nikica Jelavić	(England) Everton	Undisclosed (around £6.5 million)	
17 January 2014	(Republic of Ireland) Shane Long	(England) West Bromwich Albion	Undisclosed (around £7 million)	

=== Players out ===
Date	Player	To	Fee	Ref
9 May 2013	(England) Sonny Bradley	(England) Portsmouth	Free Transfer	
9 May 2013	(England) Danny East	(England) Portsmouth	Free Transfer	
16 May 2013	(England) Lewis Clarkson	Unattached	Free Transfer	
16 May 2013	(England) Daniel Emerton	Unattached	Free Transfer	
16 May 2013	(England) Paul McKenna	Unattached	Free Transfer	
16 May 2013	(Nigeria) Seyi Olofinjana	Unattached	Free Transfer	
16 May 2013	(England) Jay Simpson	(Thailand) Buriram United	Free Transfer	
17 May 2013	(England) Mark Cullen	(England) Luton Town	Free Transfer	
30 May 2013	(England) Andy Dawson	(England) Scunthorpe United	Free Transfer	
28 June 2013	(Republic of Ireland) Kealan Dillon	(Scotland) St Mirren	Free Transfer	
2 July 2013	(Northern Ireland) Francis McCaffrey	(Republic of Ireland) Dundalk	Free Transfer	
19 July 2013	(Republic of Ireland) Jamie Devitt	(England) Chesterfield	Free Transfer	
2 August 2013	(Northern Ireland) Corry Evans	(England) Blackburn Rovers	Undisclosed	
2 January 2014	(Scotland) Tom Cairney	(England) Blackburn Rovers	Undisclosed	
16 January 2014	(England) Aaron McLean	(England) Bradford City	Undisclosed	
31 January 2014	(England) Jack Hobbs	(England) Nottingham Forest	Undisclosed	
10 June 2014	(England) Matty Fryatt	(England) Nottingham Forest	Free transfer	

=== Loans in ===
Date From	Player	From	Date To	Ref
19 July 2013	(England) Danny Graham	(England) Sunderland	31 January 2014	
14 August 2013	(England) Jake Livermore	(England) Tottenham Hotspur	30 June 2014	
2 September 2013	(Egypt) Gedo	(Egypt) Al-Ahly	16 January 2014	

=== Loans out ===
Date From	Player	To	Date To	Ref
4 July 2013	(England) Mark Oxley	(England) Oldham Athletic	27 March 2014	
16 July 2013	(England) Jack Hobbs	(England) Nottingham Forest	24 January 2014	
1 August 2013	(Scotland) Tom Cairney	(England) Blackburn Rovers	January 2014	
2 September 2013	(England) Conor Townsend	(England) Carlisle United	29 November 2013	
2 September 2013	(England) Cameron Stewart	(England) Charlton Athletic	January 2014	
27 September 2013	(England) Matty Fryatt	(England) Sheffield Wednesday	30 November 2013	
11 October 2013	(England) Joe Cracknell	(England) Scarborough Athletic		
21 November 2013	(England) Aaron McLean	(England) Birmingham City	1 January 2014	
3 January 2014	(England) Conor Townsend	(England) Carlisle United	30 June 2014	
7 January 2014	(Switzerland) Eldin Jakupović	(England) Leyton Orient	29 January 2014	
9 January 2014	(England) Cameron Stewart	(England) Leeds United	30 June 2014	
23 January 2014	(Germany) Nick Proschwitz	(England) Barnsley	30 June 2014	
13 February 2014	(Switzerland) Eldin Jakupović	(England) Leyton Orient	27 March 2014	
27 March 2014	(Republic of Ireland) Conor Henderson	(England) Stevenage	30 June 2014	

== Kits ==
On 11 May 2013 it was revealed that the kit for the 2013–14 season would be striped and that Cash Converters have taken up the option to extend their sponsorship deal for a further season. On 10 June 2013 the adidas manufactured blue away kit was revealed. The new home kit was revealed on the club website on 3 July 2013.

Hull City's home kit for 2013–14.	Hull City's away kit for 2013–14.

== Awards ==
The annual awards was held on 7 May 2014. The event was held at the KC Stadium and Curtis Davies was named Player of the Year and Player's Player of the Year, beating Ahmed Elmohamady. Sone Aluko was awarded Goal of the Season for his strike against Newcastle United on 21 September 2013.
