= Joe Cracknell =

Joe Cracknell may refer to:

- Joe Cracknell (cricketer) (born 2000), English cricketer
- Joe Cracknell (footballer) (born 1994), English footballer
