= 2016–17 Bradford City A.F.C. season =

Bradford City
2016–17 season
- Chairman: Edic Rahic; Stefan Rupp
- Manager: Stuart McCall
- Stadium: Valley Parade
- League One: 5th
- FA Cup: First round (vs. Accrington Stanley)
- League Cup: First round (vs. Accrington Stanley)
- League Trophy: Quarter-final (vs. Oxford United)
- Top goalscorer: League: Jordy Hiwula (9); All: Jordy Hiwula (12)
- Highest home attendance: 21,874 vs. Scunthorpe United (League One)
- Lowest home attendance: 1,360 vs. Cambridge United (League Trophy)
- Average home league attendance: 18,167
Home colours	Away colours	Third colours

The 2016–17 season will be Bradford City's 114th season in their history, their 102nd in the Football League and 104th in the English football league system. Along with League One, the club will also compete in the FA Cup, League Cup and Football League Trophy.

The season covers the period from 1 July 2016 to 30 June 2017.

Following the Championship play-off final where Huddersfield Town were victorious, Bradford City received a sum of £250,000 for former striker Nahki Wells.

== Pre-season ==
Date	Opponents	H / A	Result F–A	Scorers	Attendance
9 July 2016	Guiseley	A	1–1	Hateley 75'	-
16 July 2016	Gateshead	A	2–1	B.Clarke 15', Anderson 45'	687
19 July 2016	St Johnstone	A	0–2		-
23 July 2016	Burnley	H	1–4	Morais 44'	-
27 July 2016	Bradford Park Avenue	A	2–2	Trialist (2) 19', 28'	–
30 July 2016	Carlisle United	H	2–0	Morais 52', Hanson 64'	-

== League One ==
=== League table ===
Pos	Team	Pld	W	D	L	GF	GA	GD	Pts	Promotion, qualification or relegation
3	Scunthorpe United	46	24	10	12	80	54	+26	82	Qualification for the League One play-offs (Note: Four teams play for one spot and promotion to the EFL Championship.)
4	Fleetwood Town	46	23	13	10	64	43	+21	82	Qualification for the League One play-offs
5	Bradford City	46	20	19	7	62	43	+19	79	Qualification for the League One play-offs
6	Millwall (O, P)	46	20	13	13	66	57	+9	73	Qualification for the League One play-offs
7	Southend United	46	20	12	14	70	53	+17	72	

Source: BBC Sport
Rules for classification: 1) Points; 2) Goal difference; 3) Number of goals scored
(O) Play-off winners; (P) Promoted

=== Matches ===
On 22 June 2016, the fixtures for the forthcoming season were announced.

Date	Opponents	H / A	Result F–A	Scorers	Attendance	Position
6 August 2016	Port Vale	H	0–0		18,558	15th
13 August 2016	Peterborough United	A	1–0	Hiwula 11'	5,906	9th
16 August 2016	Milton Keynes Dons	A	2–1	Cullen 12', B.Clarke 17'	8,166	5th
20 August 2016	Coventry City	H	3–1	McMahon (2) 67' (pen.), 75' (pen.), Marshall 69'	17,595	3rd
27 August 2016	Oldham Athletic	H	1–1	B.Clarke 57' (pen.)	17,793	2nd
3 September 2016	Millwall	A	1–1	Webster 42' (o.g.)	9,067	2nd
10 September 2016	Gillingham	A	1–1	Hiwula 29'	5,079	3rd
17 September 2016	Bristol Rovers	H	1–1	Meredith 73'	17,489	4th
24 September 2016	Bolton Wanderers	A	0–0		17,486	4th
27 September 2016	Fleetwood Town	H	2–1	Morais 45+1', B.Clarke 62' (pen.)	16,759	3rd
1 October 2016	Chesterfield	A	1–0	B.Clarke 26'	6,997	2nd
8 October 2016	Shrewsbury Town	H	2–0	Law 21', Vučkić 90+6' (pen.)	17,703	2nd
15 October 2016	Oxford United	A	0–1		8,245	2nd
18 October 2016	Southend United	H	1–1	McNulty 36'	16,112	2nd
22 October 2016	Sheffield United	H	3–3	B.Clarke 35', Hiwula 60', Dieng 68'	20,972	2nd
29 October 2016	AFC Wimbledon	A	3–2	Hiwula 3', Hanson (2) 78' (pen.), 90+2'	4,826	3rd
12 November 2016	Rochdale	H	4–0	B.Clarke 41', Dieng 44', Hanson 59', Marshall 63'	18,205	2nd
19 November 2016	Southend United	A	0–3		7,005	4th
22 November 2016	Northampton Town	H	1–0	Hanson 56'	16,935	4th
26 November 2016	Swindon Town	A	0–1		6,344	4th
10 December 2016	Charlton Athletic	H	0–0		17,968	4th
17 December 2016	Walsall	A	1–1	Hiwula 53'	5,148	4th
26 December 2016	Scunthorpe United	H	0–0		21,874	5th
31 December 2016	Bury	H	1–1	Law 52'	18,012	5th
2 January 2017	Northampton Town	A	2–1	Marshall 73', Hiwula 86'	6,931	5th
7 January 2017	Chesterfield	H	2–0	Marshall 22', Hiwula 45'	17,416	4th
14 January 2017	Shrewsbury Town	A	0–1		5,590	4th
21 January 2017	Millwall	H	1–1	Meredith 60'	17,712	5th
28 January 2017	Oldham Athletic	A	2–1	Vincelot 14', McArdle 76'	6,516	5th
4 February 2017	Gillingham	H	2–2	Wyke 15, McMahon 38'	18,840	5th
11 February 2017	Bristol Rovers	A	1–1	Law 26'	9,043	5th
14 February 2017	Fleetwood Town	A	1–2	Hiwula 43'	3,418	5th
18 February 2017	Bolton Wanderers	H	2–2	Wyke (2) 10', 16'	21,190	5th
25 February 2017	Port Vale	A	2–1	Vincelot 41', Jones 74'	4,953	5th
28 February 2017	Milton Keynes Dons	H	2–2	McMahon 22' (pen.), Wyke 43'	16,725	5th
4 March 2017	Peterborough United	H	1–0	Jones 24'	17,220	5th
11 March 2017	Coventry City	A	2–0	Jones 51', Hiwula 56'	9,150	4th
14 March 2017	Charlton Athletic	A	1–1	Dieng 42'	9,326	5th
18 March 2017	Swindon Town	H	2–1	Wyke (2) 85', 90+1'	17,916	4th
26 March 2017	Scunthorpe United	A	2–3	Toner 14', Jones 16'	5,247	5th
1 April 2017	Walsall	H	1–0	B.Clarke 58'	17,880	4th
8 April 2017	Bury	A	2–0	Marshall 56', Wyke 84'	5,268	4th
14 April 2017	Oxford United	H	1–0	Law 61'	19,346	4th
17 April 2017	Sheffield United	A	0–3		26,838	5th
22 April 2017	AFC Wimbledon	H	3–0	McMahon (2) 29' (pen.), 85', Marshall 45+3'	18,615	5th
30 April 2017	Rochdale	A	1–1	Jones 9'	6,876	5th

=== Play-offs ===
Date	Round	Opponents	H / A	Result F–A	Scorers	Attendance
4 May 2017	Semi-final first leg	Fleetwood Town	H	1–0	McArdle 77'	15,696
7 May 2017	Semi-final second leg	Fleetwood Town	A	0–0 (1–0)		5,076
20 May 2017	Final	Millwall	N	0–1		53,320

== FA Cup ==
Date	Round	Opponents	H / A	Result F–A	Scorers	Attendance
5 November 2016	Round 1	Accrington Stanley	H	1–2	Conneely 72' (o.g.)	4,985

== EFL Cup ==
Date	Round	Opponents	H / A	Result F–A	Scorers	Attendance
9 August 2016	Round 1	Accrington Stanley	A	0–0 (10–11p)		1,936

== EFL Trophy ==
Pos	Div	Team	Pld	W	PW	PL	L	GF	GA	GD	Pts	Qualification
1	L1	Bradford City	3	2	0	0	1	5	4	+1	6	Advance to Round 2
2	L2	Morecambe	3	2	0	0	1	7	7	0	6	Advance to Round 2
3	L1	Bury	3	1	0	1	1	6	4	+2	4	
4	ACA	Stoke City U21	3	0	1	0	2	2	5	−3	2	

Source: Sky Sports

Date	Round	Opponents	H / A	Result F–A	Scorers	Attendance
29 August 2016	Group Stage	Stoke City Academy	H	1–0	Dieng 38'	1,444
4 October 2016	Group Stage	Bury	H	2–1	Vučkić 31', Hiwula 35'	1,865
9 November 2016	Group Stage	Morecambe	A	2–3	Vučkić (2) 52', 83'	827
7 December 2016	Round 2	Cambridge United	H	1–0	Law 64'	1,360
17 January 2017	Round 3	Cheltenham Town	A	1–0	Hiwula 64'	1,081
31 January 2017	Quarter Final	Oxford United	A	1–2	Hiwula 85'	2,274

== Squad statistics ==
No.	Pos.	Name	League		FA Cup		EFL Cup		EFL Trophy		Total		Discipline	
No.	Pos.	Name	Apps	Goals	Apps	Goals	Apps	Goals	Apps	Goals	Apps	Goals	Yellow card	Red card
1	GK	(Republic of Ireland) Colin Doyle	47	0	1	0	1	0	1	0	50	0	0	0
2	DF	(England) Stephen Darby	19(3)	0	1	0	0	0	5	0	25(3)	0	1	0
3	DF	(Australia) James Meredith	44	2	0	0	1	0	3	0	48	2	7	0
4	MF	(England) Nicky Law	40(3)	4	0(1)	0	1	0	2	1	43(4)	5	2	0
5	DF	(Republic of Ireland) Kevin Toner	2	1	0	0	0	0	0	0	2	1	0	0
6	DF	(France) Romain Vincelot	48	2	0	0	1	0	2	0	51	2	12	0
7	MF	(Jamaica) Mark Marshall	41(4)	6	1	0	0(1)	0	3	0	45(5)	6	3	0
8	MF	(France) Timothee Dieng	28(14)	3	1	0	0	0	5	1	34(14)	4	1	0
9	FW	(England) Charlie Wyke	19	7	0	0	0	0	0	0	19	7	0	0
10	FW	(Republic of Ireland) Billy Clarke	28(8)	7	0(1)	0	1	0	1(1)	0	30(10)	7	3	0
11	FW	(England) Jordy Hiwula	26(16)	9	0(1)	0	1	0	5	3	32(17)	12	2	0
12	GK	(Germany) Rouven Sattelmaier	2	0	0	0	0	0	5(1)	0	7(1)	0	0	0
14	MF	(Republic of Ireland) Josh Cullen	43	1	0	0	0	0	1(2)	0	44(2)	1	4	0
17	DF	(England) Matthew Penney	0(1)	0	0	0	0	0	0	0	0(1)	0	0	0
18	MF	(England) Alex Gilliead	5(5)	0	0	0	0	0	0	0	5(5)	0	0	0
19	FW	(England) Alex Jones	9(7)	5	0	0	0	0	0	0	9(7)	5	1	0
20	DF	(England) Daniel Pybus	0(1)	0	0	0	0	0	0	0	0(1)	0	0	0
21	DF	(England) James King	0	0	0	0	0	0	1	0	1	0	0	0
22	DF	(England) Nathaniel Knight-Percival	45	0	0	0	1	0	1(1)	0	47(1)	0	8	0
23	DF	(Northern Ireland) Rory McArdle	25(2)	2	1	0	0	0	5	0	31(2)	2	0	0
24	MF	(England) Daniel Devine	8(3)	0	1	0	1	0	4(2)	0	14(5)	0	1	0
25	FW	(England) Reece Webb-Foster	0(1)	0	0	0	0(1)	0	1	0	1(2)	0	0	0
26	DF	(England) Matthew Kilgallon	6(1)	0	1	0	0	0	3(1)	0	10(2)	0	0	0
29	DF	(England) Tony McMahon	28	6	0	0	1	0	1(1)	0	30(1)	6	7	0
30	GK	(England) Joe Cracknell	0	0	0	0	0	0	0	0	0	0	0	0
31	DF	(England) Kwame Boateng	0	0	0	0	0	0	1(1)	0	1(1)	0	0	0
32	MF	(England) Ellis Hudson	0(1)	0	0	0	0	0	1(2)	0	1(3)	0	0	0
33	MF	(England) Niah Payne	0	0	0	0	0	0	0	0	0	0	0	0
34	DF	(England) Tom Windle	0	0	0	0	0	0	1(2)	0	1(2)	0	0	0
35	MF	(England) Sam Wright	0	0	0	0	0	0	0(1)	0	0(1)	0	0	0
-	DF	(England) Nathan Clarke	0	0	1	0	0	0	3	0	4	0	1	0
-	FW	(England) James Hanson	13(4)	4	1	0	1	0	1	0	16(4)	4	1	0
-	MF	(England) Paul Anderson	0(3)	0	0	0	1	0	0	0	1(3)	0	1	0
-	FW	(Poland) Vincent Rabiega	0(1)	0	0	0	0	0	2(1)	0	2(2)	0	0	0
-	FW	(Scotland) Marc McNulty	5(10)	1	0	0	0	0	1	0	6(10)	1	1	0
-	FW	(Slovenia) Haris Vuckic	4(6)	1	1	0	0	0	3	3	8(6)	4	0	0
-	MF	(Portugal) Filipe Morais	4(13)	1	1	0	0(1)	0	4	0	9(14)	1	1	0
-	DF	(England) Jacob Hanson	0	0	0	0	0	0	0	0	0	0	0	0
-	–	Own goals	–	1	–	1	–	0	–	0	–	2	–	–

Statistics accurate as of 20 May 2017

== Transfers ==
=== Transfers in ===
Date from	Position	Nationality	Name	From	Fee	Ref.
1 July 2016	CB	(England)	Nathaniel Knight-Percival	Shrewsbury Town	Free transfer	
1 July 2016	CM	(England)	Nicky Law	Rangers	Free transfer	
12 July 2016	GK	(Republic of Ireland)	Colin Doyle	Blackpool	£1	
13 July 2016	DM	(France)	Timothée Dieng	Oldham Athletic	Free transfer	
22 July 2016	GK	(Germany)	Rouven Sattelmaier	Stuttgarter Kickers	Free transfer	
23 July 2016	CM	(France)	Romain Vincelot	Coventry City	Undisclosed	
1 August 2016	CB	(England)	Matthew Kilgallon	Blackburn Rovers	Free transfer	
16 August 2016	CF	(Poland)	Vincent Rabiega	RB Leipzig	Free transfer	
5 January 2017	CF	(England)	Alex Jones	Birmingham City	Undisclosed	
31 January 2017	DF	(England)	Jacob Hanson	Huddersfield Town	Undisclosed	
31 January 2017	CF	(England)	Charlie Wyke	Carlisle United	Undisclosed	

=== Transfers out ===
Date from	Position	Nationality	Name	To	Fee	Ref.
1 July 2016	CF	(England)	Steve Davies	Rochdale	Released	(Note: Following Davies' release, he signed for Rochdale.)
1 July 2016	CM	(England)	Billy Knott	Gillingham	Released	(Note: Following Knott's release, he signed for Gillingham.)
1 July 2016	LB	(England)	Greg Leigh	Bury	Free transfer	
1 July 2016	LM	(England)	Josh Morris	Scunthorpe United	Free transfer	
1 July 2016	RM	(England)	Dylan Mottley-Henry	Barnsley	Released	
1 July 2016	CB	(France)	Christopher Routis	Ross County	Free transfer	
1 July 2016	LB	(Republic of Ireland)	Alan Sheehan	Luton Town	Free transfer	
1 July 2016	GK	(England)	Ben Williams	Bury	Free transfer	
1 July 2016	CM	(England)	Sam Wright	Free agent	Released	
5 July 2016	CF	(England)	Jamie Proctor	Bolton Wanderers	Free transfer	
31 August 2016	RW	(England)	Paul Anderson	Northampton Town	Free transfer	
1 January 2017	CB	(England)	Nathan Clarke	Coventry City	Free transfer	
24 January 2017	CF	(England)	James Hanson	Sheffield United	Undisclosed	
31 January 2017	RW	(Portugal)	Filipe Morais	Bolton Wanderers	Mutual consent	(Note: Following Filipe Morais' departure, he signed for Bolton Wanderers.)

=== Loans in ===
Date from	Position	Nationality	Name	From	Date until	Ref.
15 July 2016	CF	(England)	Jordy Hiwula	Huddersfield Town	End of Season	
8 August 2016	CM	(Republic of Ireland)	Josh Cullen	West Ham United	End of Season (Note: On 3 January 2017, Josh Cullen's loan from West Ham United was extended until the end of the season.)	
31 August 2016	FW	(Scotland)	Marc McNulty	Sheffield United	2 January 2017 (Note: On 2 January 2017, Sheffield United recalled Marc McNulty.)	
31 August 2016	AM	(Slovenia)	Haris Vučkić	Newcastle United	3 January 2017	
12 January 2017	RW	(England)	Alex Gilliead	Newcastle United	End of Season	
31 January 2017	LB	(England)	Matthew Penney	Sheffield Wednesday	End of Season	
31 January 2017	CB	(Republic of Ireland)	Kevin Toner	Aston Villa	End of Season	

=== Loans out ===
Date from	Position	Nationality	Name	To	Date until	Ref.
29 August 2016	GK	(England)	Joe Cracknell	Bradford Park Avenue	14 January 2017	
