= James Hanson (footballer, born 1987) =

English footballer (born 1987)

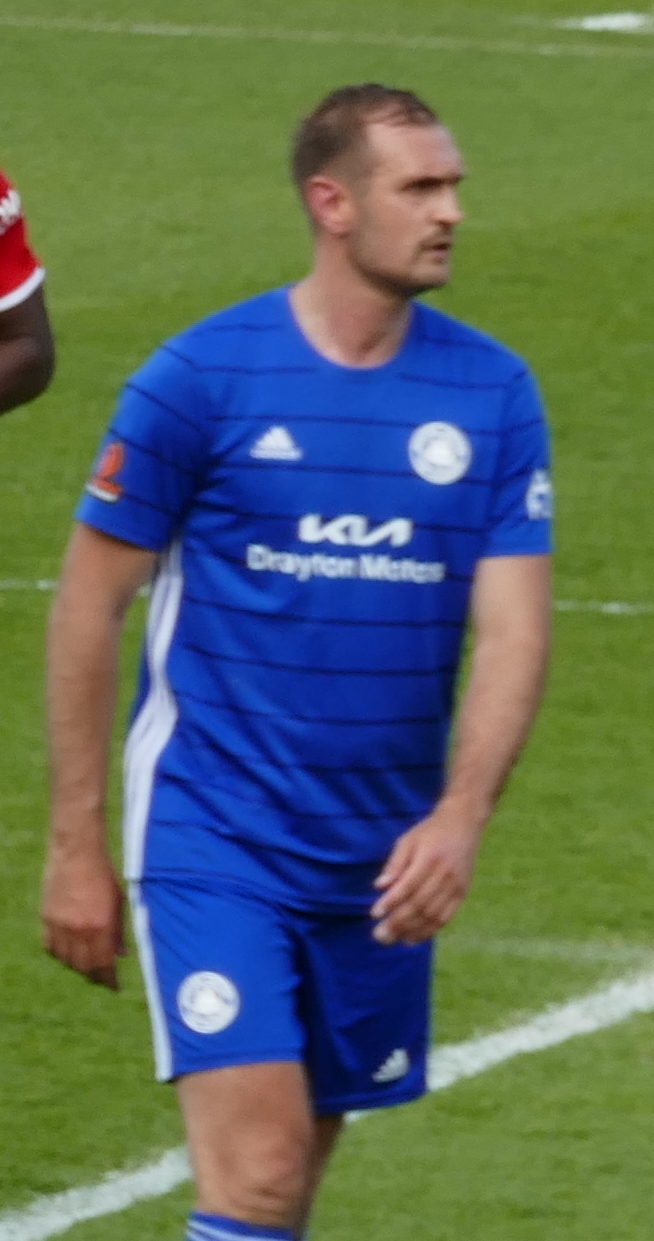
- Hanson playing for Boston United in 2022

Personal information
- Full name: James Robert Hanson
- Date of birth: 9 November 1987 (age 39)
- Place of birth: Bradford, England
- Height: 6 ft 4 in (1.93 m)
- Position: Striker

Team information
- Current team: Keighley Town

Youth career
- Huddersfield Town
- Bradford City

Senior career*
Years	Team	Apps	(Gls)
2006–2007	Eccleshill United		
2007–2009	Guiseley	83	(36)
2009–2017	Bradford City	283	(77)
2017–2018	Sheffield United	14	(1)
2018	→ Bury (loan)	17	(0)
2018–2019	AFC Wimbledon	29	(5)
2019–2021	Grimsby Town	52	(11)
2021–2022	Farsley Celtic	14	(4)
2022	Boston United	13	(2)
2022–2024	Worksop Town	31	(7)
2024	Bradford (Park Avenue)	9	(1)
2026–	Keighley Town		
- * Club domestic league appearances and goals

James Robert Hanson (born 9 November 1987) is an English former professional footballer who plays for Keighley Town as a striker.

After playing youth football for Huddersfield Town and Bradford City, Hanson began his career in semi-professional non-league football, playing for Eccleshill United and Guiseley. He turned professional after re-signing with Bradford City in 2009, for whom he made over 300 appearances. He later played in the Football League for Sheffield United, Bury, AFC Wimbledon and Grimsby Town, before returning to non-league, where he played for Farsley Celtic, Boston United, Worksop Town and Bradford (Park Avenue).

== Playing career ==
=== Early career ===
Born in Bradford, West Yorkshire, Hanson played youth football for Huddersfield Town (where he was let go at the age of 15 for being too small), as well as Bradford City. He began his senior career playing semi-professional non-league football with Eccleshill United and Guiseley, balancing his football career with a job in a local Co-operative supermarket in Idle, Bradford. Bradford City fans later sang a song about Hanson's supermarket work.

=== Bradford City ===
==== 2009–10 season ====
Hanson signed his first professional contract with Bradford City in July 2009, with his transfer fee set by a tribunal hearing six months later at a figure close to £7,500, a sell-on clause and the agreement of a friendly between the two sides. In making the move, Hanson took nearly a 50% pay cut.

Hanson made his debut for Bradford on the opening day of the 2009–10 season, on 8 August 2009, in a 5–0 defeat against Notts County. Hanson scored his first goal for Bradford on 22 August 2009, in a 5–4 victory away at Cheltenham Town. Hanson won the Player of the Year award during his first season at Bradford City, and was rewarded with a new, improved contract for the next four years.

==== 2010–11 season ====
Ahead of his second season with the club, Hanson decided to bulk up.

==== 2011–12 season ====
In February 2012, Hanson suffered a groin injury, and was estimated to miss six weeks of matches. During the 2011–12 season, Hanson scored 14 goals, his highest tally to date in three years as a professional.

==== 2012–13 season ====
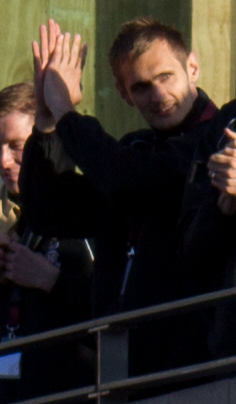
Hanson with the victory parade that followed Bradford City's victory in the 2013 League Two play-off final

In October 2012, teammate Andrew Davies stated his belief that Hanson's goals would help the club achieve promotion. He scored Bradford City's goal in the second leg League Cup semi-final tie against Aston Villa, and was named Man Of The Match for the second leg, helping Bradford to the League Cup final. Hanson had a broken toe prior to the match, and received an injection for it 15 minutes before kick-off. Hanson's performance was praised by former manager Steve Kittrick.

Hanson played in the 2013 Football League Cup Final; after the match, he said he believed Bradford City would return to Wembley via the League Two play-offs. Hanson scored two goals in the next three League matches, reaching 10 goals for the season, and later that month he stated that the club had to win both forthcoming Easter games. In April 2013, Hanson spoke of the "buzz" around the club as they mounted a play-off challenge. On 5 May, he scored a vital goal in the second leg of the play-off semi-final against Burton Albion, helping Bradford overcome a 3–2 deficit from the home leg to win the game 3–1 and the tie 5–4 on aggregate. In the Final at Wembley, Hanson scored in a 3–0 victory against Northampton Town, and later spoke about how he was looking forward to playing in a higher division.

==== 2013–14 season ====
Ahead of the 2013–14 season, Bradford City manager Phil Parkinson said that only a high-money bid would persuade the club to sell either Hanson and fellow striker Nahki Wells. In July 2013, Hanson was praised by former Bradford City left-back Wayne Jacobs, and in August 2013 Hanson spoke positively of his partnership with teammate Nahki Wells. Wells has also publicly praised his strike partnership with Hanson, as has journalist Simon Parker, who described them as "[one of] the best front pairs that League One has to offer." Hanson has also been praised by manager Phil Parkinson. In October 2013 Hanson spoke about his use of a mind coach. On 29 November 2013 he signed a new contract with the club, taking him up to the end of the 2016–17 season, and becoming the first player at the club to sign a new contract that season. In December 2013 fellow Bradford City player Andrew Davies described Wells and Hanson as the best strike pair in the division. The partnership ended when Wells was sold to Huddersfield Town in January 2014. In February 2014, after Hanson scored his 10th goal of the season, Davies spoke about Hanson's increase in playing form. In March 2014, Hanson spoke about new strike partner Aaron McLean's lack of goals for the club, while Hanson himself had scored 6 goals in 9 games. That same month Hanson was revealed as the player in 3 divisions of the Football League who had committed the most fouls in the 2013–14 season to date; he was defended by manager Phil Parkinson. Throughout March and April, Hanson suffered a number of minor injuries which prevented him from playing, making only 1 appearance in the past 7 games as of 25 April 2014. His work-rate during that season was later praised by former teammate Andy Gray. In 2014, Hanson was diagnosed with arthritis.

==== 2014–15 season ====
Ahead of the 2014–15 season the club implemented new a playing style and match tactics, and Hanson stated he was looking forward to showing that he was able to adapt to it. In August 2014, after scoring five goals in the season to date, Hanson entered the club's top ten all-time scorer list. In September 2014 it was announced that Hanson was suffering from a thigh injury, and could miss up to 5 matches. In December 2014, following his return from injury, Hanson was kept out of the starting line-up by Jon Stead and Billy Clarke. In January 2015 Hanson praised Stead, while later that month he was himself praised by ex-Bantam striker Dean Windass. Following Bradford City's shock victory in the FA Cup over Chelsea, Hanson was praised by their captain John Terry. Hanson later described the Chelsea match as his favourite game for Bradford City.

In April 2015 Hanson declared that he was aiming to score 20 goals a season for the club; at that point he was on 11 goals, having not scored for two months. In May 2015 the club rejected an undisclosed transfer bid for Hanson from Millwall. Despite the rejection, Millwall stated they were still interested in signing Hanson, and Bradford City turned down a second bid a few weeks later. Bradford City delayed any possible transfer while they searched for a replacement, although Hanson later stated he wished to remain at the club. Hanson credited manager Phil Parkinson with persuading him to stay at the club.

==== 2015–16 season ====
At the start of the 2015–16 season, Hanson discussed his striker partnership with new summer signing Devante Cole. He was dropped from the starting XI in October 2015, following a poor performance in a previous game, having played every game up to that point of the season. After an injury to his replacement Steve Davies, Hanson returned to the first-team later that month, scoring in his first game back in the starting XI. In November 2015 he suffered an ankle ligaments injury in an FA Cup game.

On 13 February 2016 he made his 300th appearance for the club, scoring two goals in the process. On 23 April 2016 he scored a hat-trick as City beat promotion rivals Walsall 4–0; it was his first professional hat-trick, having previously not started a game since 5 March.

==== 2016–17 season ====
After playing in the first two games of the 2016–17 season, Hanson missed over a month of play due to a calf problem. He scored his first goal of the season in a 3–2 victory against AFC Wimbledon on 29 October, scoring twice. Upon leaving Bradford City, he had scored 91 goals in 335 appearances, and was third on the club's all time scorer list.

=== Sheffield United ===
On 21 January 2017 Sheffield United made an offer for Hanson. The transfer was completed on 24 January 2017. He stated that he was looking forward to playing against his old club. He scored on his debut in a 4–0 win over AFC Wimbledon on 4 February 2017. In August 2017 and November 2017 he was linked with a return to Bradford City, although the club's manager Stuart McCall dismissed the rumours.

Hanson made his debut in the Championship in November 2017, against Fulham.

He moved on loan to Bury in January 2018. He was transfer-listed by Sheffield United at the end of the 2017–18 season.

=== AFC Wimbledon ===
On 26 June 2018, Hanson left Sheffield United by mutual consent, and joined AFC Wimbledon.

Hanson struggled with minor injuries during the 2018–19 season. Wimbledon's last game of the season was away at Hanson's former club Bradford City.

In June 2019 he was linked with a possible return to Bradford City, but the link was denied by City manager Gary Bowyer.

=== Grimsby Town ===
In June 2019 he signed for Grimsby Town, on a two-year contract.

He scored 5 goals and made 3 assists in August 2019, which saw him awarded the EFL League Two Player of the Month for the month.

On 12 May 2021 it was announced that he would leave Grimsby at the end of the season, following the expiry of his contract.

=== Non-league ===
On 13 July 2021, Hanson signed with National League North side Farsley Celtic, having rejected interest from a number of League Two and National League clubs, to return to part-time football.

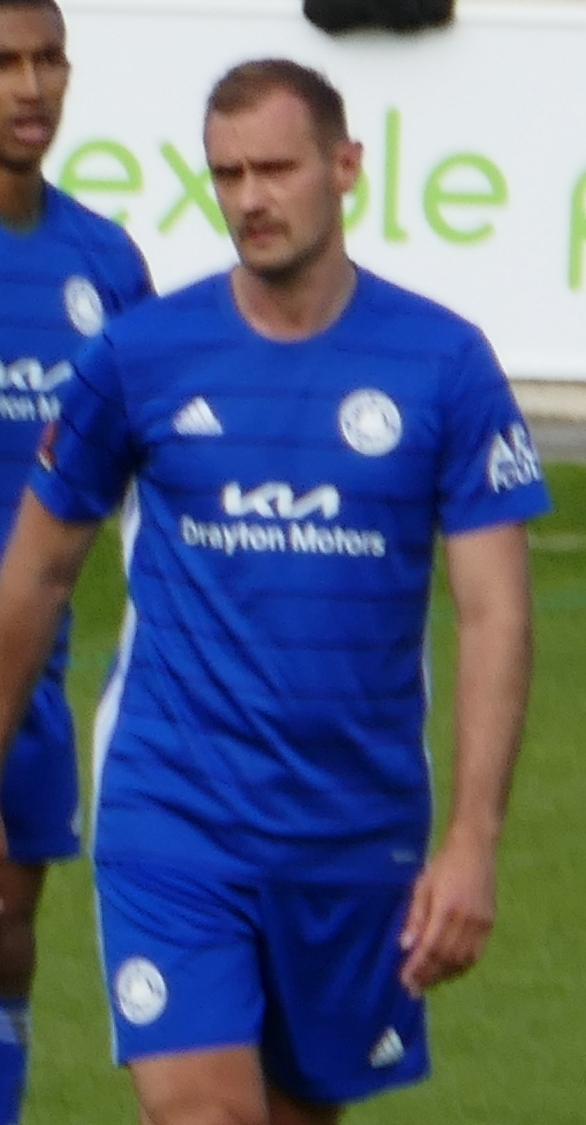
Hanson playing for Boston United in 2022

On 14 January 2022, Hanson signed for Boston United until end of the 2021–22 season. He was not retained at the end of the season.

On 12 June 2022, Hanson signed for Worksop Town ahead of the 2022–23 season.

Hanson announced his retirement in January 2024. He was later praised by former Bradford City strike partner Nahki Wells.

In March 2024, Hanson came out of retirement to join Bradford (Park Avenue). He re-signed with the club for the 2024–25 season. His contract with Park Avenue was on a 'pay as you play' basis, to fit around his family and work life.

Hanson retired for a second time in October 2024.

Hanson came out of retirement again in September 2026, signing with Keighley Town.

== Coaching career ==
Hanson began coaching at the RIASA Academy in September 2021.

== Personal life ==
Hanson attended Beckfoot School in Bingley from 1999 to 2004. Hanson and his wife Jodie had their first child, a daughter named Lexie, in November 2012. Lexie was blessed the day after her father scored in the League Two Playoff Final at Wembley. Jodie is a teacher who remained in the north when Hanson moved to London to play for Wimbledon.

Hanson has fundraised for former teammate Stephen Darby's MND charity.

== Career statistics ==
As of 6 May 2024

Appearances and goals by club, season and competition
Club	Season	League			FA Cup		League Cup		Other		Total	
Club	Season	Division	Apps	Goals	Apps	Goals	Apps	Goals	Apps	Goals	Apps	Goals
Guiseley	2006–07	NPL Premier Division	12	0	0	0	—		2 (Note: Two appearances and one goal in Northern Premier League Chairman's Cup)	1	14	1
Guiseley	2007–08	NPL Premier Division	38	20	4	1	—		6 (Note: Four appearances and one goal in FA Trophy, one appearance and one goal in Northern Premier League Challenge Cup, one appearance and one goal in West Riding County Cup)	3	48	24
Guiseley	2008–09	NPL Premier Division	33	16	3	0	—		7 (Note: Five appearances and three goals in Northern Challenge Cup, one appearance and one goal in West Riding County Cup, one appearance in Northern Premier League playoffs)	4	43	20
Guiseley	Total		83	36	7	1	0	0	15	8	105	45
Bradford City	2009–10	League Two	34	12	1	0	1	0	3 (Note: Appearance(s) in Football League Trophy)	1	39	13
Bradford City	2010–11	League Two	36	6	1	2	2	1	0	0	39	9
Bradford City	2011–12	League Two	39	13	3	1	1	0	3	0	46	14
Bradford City	2012–13	League Two	43	10	3	1	8	2	5 (Note: Two appearances in Football League Trophy, three appearances and two goals in League Two playoffs)	2	59	15
Bradford City	2013–14	League One	35	12	1	0	1	0	0	0	37	12
Bradford City	2014–15	League One	38	9	7	1	2	1	1	0	48	11
Bradford City	2015–16	League One	41	11	4	1	1	1	1	0	47	13
Bradford City	2016–17	League One	17	4	1	0	1	0	1 (Note: Appearance(s) in EFL Trophy)	0	20	4
Bradford City	Total		283	77	21	6	17	5	14	3	335	91
Sheffield United	2016–17	League One	13	1	0	0	0	0	0	0	13	1
Sheffield United	2017–18	Championship	1	0	0	0	1	0	0	0	2	0
Sheffield United	Total		14	1	0	0	1	0	0	0	15	1
Bury (loan)	2017–18	League One	17	0	0	0	0	0	1	0	18	0
AFC Wimbledon	2018–19	League One	29	5	1	0	2	0	2	0	34	5
Grimsby Town	2019–20	League Two	29	9	1	0	2	0	0	0	32	9
Grimsby Town	2020–21	League Two	23	2	0	0	0	0	0	0	23	2
Grimsby Town	Total		52	11	1	0	2	0	0	0	55	11
Farsley Celtic	2021–22	National League North	14	4	0	0	—		0	0	14	4
Boston United	2021–22	National League North	13	2	—		—		2 (Note: One appearance in FA Trophy, one appearance in National League North playoffs)	0	15	2
Worksop Town	2022–23	NPL East Division	23	6	3	0	0	0	3 (Note: Two appearances and one goal in the FA Trophy, one appearance in the Sheffield & Hallamshire Senior Cup)	1	29	7
Worksop Town	2023–24	NPL Premier Division	8	1	0	0	0	0	0	0	8	1
Worksop Town	Total		31	7	3	0	0	0	3	1	37	8
Bradford (Park Avenue)	2023–24	NPL Premier Division	5	1	0	0	0	0	0	0	5	1
Bradford (Park Avenue)	2024–25	NPL Premier Division	4	0	0	0	0	0	2 (Note: Appearances in the FA Trophy)	0	6	0
Bradford (Park Avenue)	Total		9	1	0	0	0	0	2	0	11	1
Career total			545	143	32	7	22	5	39	12	638	168

== Honours ==
Guiseley

- Northern Premier League Chairman's Cup: 2006–07
- Northern Premier League Challenge Cup: 2008–09

Bradford City

- Football League Two play-offs: 2013
- Football League Cup runner-up: 2012–13

Sheffield United

- EFL League One: 2016–17

Individual

- EFL League Two Player of the Month: August 2019
