= Kwame Boateng (English footballer) =

English footballer

Personal information
- Full name: Kwame Owusu Boateng
- Date of birth: 21 November 1998 (age 27)
- Place of birth: London, England
- Position: Right back

Team information
- Current team: Airdrieonians

Youth career
- 2014–2016: Bradford City

Senior career*
Years	Team	Apps	(Gls)
2016–2018	Bradford City	0	(0)
2018	Whitkirk Wanderers		
2018–2019	Harrogate Town		
2019	Guiseley	0	(0)
2019	→ Farsley Celtic (loan)		
2019	Farsley Celtic	0	(0)
2019	Ossett United	2	(0)
2019–2020	Albion Sports		
2020	Goole		
2020–2021	The New Saints	10	(1)
2021–2022	Sheffield Wednesday	0	(0)
2022–2023	Guiseley	29	(0)
2023	Alfreton Town	0	(0)
2023	Grantham Town	2	(0)
2023–2024	Liversedge	23	(2)
2024–2025	Chorley	0	(0)
2025–2026	Cleethorpes Town	0	(0)
2026–	Airdrieonians	8	(0)
- * Club domestic league appearances and goals as of 21:00, 14 October 2026 (UTC)

Kwame Owusu Boateng (born 21 November 1998) is an English professional footballer who plays as a right back for Scottish League One club Airdrieonians.

== Career ==
Born in London, Boateng spent four years with Bradford City, making two appearances in the Football League Trophy during the 2016–17 season. By February 2018 he was playing for Whitkirk Wanderers in the Leeds Combination League. He began the 2018–19 season with Harrogate Town, before moving to Guiseley in February 2019. On 9 March 2019, he was loaned out for one month to Farsley Celtic and helped the team gain promotion. He left Guiseley in May 2019, before returning to Farsley Celtic on a permanent basis in June 2019.

On 31 August 2019, he joined Ossett United on a dual registration, making 2 league appearances. He later joined Albion Sports and then Goole in February 2020.

In September 2020 he signed for Welsh club The New Saints. He left the club in June 2021.

On 10 December 2021, he joined Sheffield Wednesday, playing with the club's under-23 squad. On 16 March 2022, manager Darren Moore announced he would be leaving the club upon the expiry of his contract.

On 27 September 2022, he re-joined Guiseley.

In September 2023, he joined Alfreton Town but joined Grantham Town a month later having failed to make a first-team appearance.

After playing for Liversedge, in July 2024 Boateng joined National League North side Chorley.

In August 2025, Boateng joined Northern Premier League club Cleethorpes Town.

On 18 July 2026, Boateng joined Scottish League One side Airdrieonians.

== Career statistics ==
As of 13 March 2019.

Club	Season	League			FA Cup		League Cup		Other		Total	
Club	Season	Division	Apps	Goals	Apps	Goals	Apps	Goals	Apps	Goals	Apps	Goals
Bradford City	2016–17	League One	0	0	0	0	0	0	2 (Note: Appearances in the Football League Trophy.)	0	2	0
Bradford City	2017–18	League One	0	0	0	0	0	0	0	0	0	0
Bradford City	Total		0	0	0	0	0	0	2	0	2	0
Guiseley	2018–19	National League North	0	0	0	0	0	0	0	0	0	0
Career total			0	0	0	0	0	0	2	0	2	0
