= 2015–16 Bradford City A.F.C. season =

Bradford City
2015–16 season
- Chairman: Mark Lawn; Julian Rhodes
- Manager: Philip Parkinson (until 10 June); Stuart McCall (from 20 June)
- Stadium: Valley Parade
- League One: 5th – Play Off Semi-Final
- FA Cup: 3rd round replay (knocked out by Bury)
- League Cup: 1st round (knocked out by York City)
- FL Trophy: 2nd round (knocked out by Barnsley)
- Top goalscorer: League: James Hanson (11); All: James Hanson (13)
- Highest home attendance: 19,317 vs. Sheffield United (League One, 20 September)
Home colours	Away colours	Third colours

The 2015–16 season will be Bradford City's 113th season in their history, their 101st in the Football League and 103rd in the English football league system. Along with League One, the club will also compete in the FA Cup, League Cup and Football League Trophy. The season covers the period from 1 July 2015 to 30 June 2016. The new kits were announced in April 2015 – a claret and amber checked home kit, and an all-black away kit.

== Pre-season friendlies ==
On 5 June 2015, Bradford City announced their first pre-season friendly against Guiseley. On 10 July 2015, the club confirmed as part of the Scotland tour they will face St Mirren. A day later the Bantams announced they will play host to Carlisle United on 25 July 2015. A pre-season friendly against Burnley was confirmed on 12 June 2015. On 19 June 2015, Bradford City confirmed a friendly against Farsley. On 30 June 2015, the Bantams confirmed their second friendly during the week-long stay in Scotland. On 20 July 2015, Bradford City announced they will send a XI side to Ossett Albion. On 23 July 2015, Bradford announced another friendly addition against Whitby Town.

Date	Opponents	H / A	Result F–A	Scorers	Attendance
11 July 2015	Farsley Celtic	A	3–0	Hanson (2) 19', 27', Watt 36'	–
14 July 2015	Motherwell	A	3–0	Leigh 45', Sheehan 63', Hanson 70'	–
18 July 2015	St Mirren	A	1–0	B.Clarke 15'	–
21 July 2015	Guiseley	A	1–2	Drury 34'	–
25 July 2015	Carlisle United	H	2–0	Morris 58', Liddle 72'	–
28 July 2015	Whitby Town	A	0–1		
1 August 2015	Burnley	A	0–2		

== League One ==
=== Matches ===
On 17 June 2015, the fixtures for the forthcoming season were announced.

Date	Opponents	H / A	Result F–A	Scorers	Attendance	Position
8 August 2015	Swindon Town	A	1–4	Morris 4'	8,090	23rd
15 August 2015	Shrewsbury Town	H	1–1	B. Clarke 43'	18,039	24th
18 August 2015	Gillingham	H	1–2	Hanson 7'	17,496	24th
22 August 2015	Barnsley	A	0–0		10,342	22nd
29 August 2015	Port Vale	H	1–0	Cole 90'	17,806	16th
5 September 2015	Oldham Athletic	A	2–1	Burke 21', Cole 63'	5,619	11th
12 September 2015	Fleetwood Town	A	1–1	Hanson 20'	4,044	14th
20 September 2015	Sheffield United	H	2–2	Meredith 33', Cole 47'	19,317	12th
26 September 2015	Peterborough United	H	0–2		17,970	18th
29 September 2015	Colchester United	A	0–2		3,334	19th
3 October 2015	Rochdale	A	3–1	Evans 34', Cole 59', Lancashire 61' (o.g.)	4,534	16th
17 October 2015	Doncaster Rovers	A	1–0	Cole 1'	8,410	15th
20 October 2015	Bury	H	2–1	McArdle 45', Brown 51' (o.g.)	17,575	11th
24 October 2015	Wigan Athletic	H	1–1	Hanson 63'	19,171	14th
31 October 2015	Millwall	A	0–0		9,367	14th
3 November 2015	Blackpool	H	1–0	Hanson 45'	17,435	9th
14 November 2015	Crewe Alexandra	H	2–0	Liddle 45', B.Clarke 58'	17,546	7th
21 November 2015	Scunthorpe United	A	2–0	McMahon 28' (pen.), Leigh 52'	4,865	7th
24 November 2015	Coventry City	H	0–0		17,757	6th
28 November 2015	Walsall	A	1–2	Evans 64'	4,668	9th
19 December 2015	Chesterfield	A	1–0	McMahon 72'	6,795	8th
28 December 2015	Sheffield United	A	1–3	Liddle 83'	24,777	10th
2 January 2016	Gillingham	A	0–3		6,446	12th
16 January 2016	Oldham Athletic	H	1–0	McMahon 50'	18,522	10th
23 January 2016	Port Vale	A	1–1	Proctor 65'	4,849	10th
26 January 2016	Barnsley	H	0–1		17,470	11th
30 January 2016	Fleetwood Town	H	2–1	Hanson 67', Davies 90+3'	17,554	10th
6 February 2016	Burton Albion	A	1–3	McArdle 90+2'	3,796	12th
13 February 2016	Peterborough United	A	4–0	Hanson (2) 45', 68', Reid 56', Davies 77'	5,816	11th
16 February 2016	Southend United	H	2–0	McMahon 17', Hanson 74'	17,701	8th
20 February 2016	Rochdale	H	2–2	McArdle 40', Davies 62'	17,936	8th
27 February 2016	Blackpool	A	1–0	Reid 54'	8,780	7th
1 March 2016	Colchester United	H	1–2	Thomas 17'	16,786	9th
5 March 2016	Bury	A	0–0		4,036	8th
8 March 2016	Burton Albion	H	2–0	Reid 13', Burke 28'	17,500	7th
12 March 2016	Doncaster Rovers	H	2–1	Proctor (2) 7', 49'	17,889	6th
19 March 2016	Wigan Athletic	A	0–1		10,890	7th
26 March 2016	Millwall	H	1–0	Davies 79'	18,538	6th
28 March 2016	Crewe Alexandra	A	1–0	Proctor 50'	5,320	6th
2 April 2016	Scunthorpe United	H	1–0	Davies 68'	17,873	5th
9 April 2016	Swindon Town	H	1–0	B.Clarke 20'	18,043	3rd
16 April 2016	Shrewsbury Town	A	1–1	Proctor 71'	6,247	4th
23 April 2016	Walsall	H	4–0	Morais 54', Hanson (3) 58', 72', 73'	19,336	5th
30 April 2016	Southend United	A	1–0	Evans 12'	8,571	5th
8 May 2016	Chesterfield	H	2–0	Evans 7', B.Clarke 87'	20,807	5th

=== League table ===
Pos	Team	Pld	W	D	L	GF	GA	GD	Pts	Promotion, qualification or relegation
3	Walsall	46	24	12	10	71	49	+22	84	Qualification for the League One play-offs (Note: Four teams play for one spot and promotion to Football League Championship.)
4	Millwall	46	24	9	13	73	49	+24	81	Qualification for the League One play-offs
5	Bradford City	46	23	11	12	55	40	+15	80	Qualification for the League One play-offs
6	Barnsley (O, P)	46	22	8	16	70	54	+16	74	Qualification for the League One play-offs
7	Scunthorpe United	46	21	11	14	60	47	+13	74	

Updated to match(es) played on 1 July 2016. Source: BBC Sport
Rules for classification: 1) Points; 2) Goal difference; 3) Number of goals scored
(O) Play-off winners; (P) Promoted

=== Play-offs ===
After finishing fifth in League One, City were entered into the end-of-season play-offs to determine who would get promoted to Championship for the 2016–17 season. Bradford were against fourth-placed Millwall in the semi-finals and played them over two legs.

Date	Round	Opponents	H / A	Result F–A	Scorers	Attendance
15 May 2016	Semi-final; First leg	Millwall	H	1–3	McMahon 13' (pen.)	19,241
20 May 2016	Semi-final; First leg	Millwall	A	1–1	Proctor 44'	16,301

== FA Cup ==
Date	Round	Opponents	H / A	Result F–A	Scorers	Attendance
8 November 2015	Round 1	Aldershot Town	A	0–0		2,640
18 November 2015	Round 1 replay	Aldershot Town	H	2–0	Leigh 61', McMahon 76' (pen.)	2,930
6 December 2015	Round 2	Chesham	H	4–0	Reid 22', Hanson 43', Liddle 90', Cole 90'	6,047
9 January 2016	Round 3	Bury	A	0–0		6,962
19 January 2016	Round 3 replay	Bury	H	0–0 (2–4p)		6,227

== League Cup ==
On 16 June 2015, the first round draw was made, Bradford City were drawn away against York City.

Date	Round	Opponents	H / A	Result F–A	Scorers	Attendance
11 August 2015	Round 1	York City	A	2–2 (2–4p)	Routis 21', Hanson 90'	4,201

== Football League Trophy ==
On 5 September 2015, the second round draw was shown live on Soccer AM and drawn by Charlie Austin and Ed Skrein. Bradford will host Barnsley.

Date	Round	Opponents	H / A	Result F–A	Scorers	Attendance
13 October 2015	Round 2	Barnsley	H	1–2	Knott 22'	4,127

== Squad statistics ==
No.	Pos.	Name	League		FA Cup		League Cup		League Trophy		Total		Discipline	
No.	Pos.	Name	Apps	Goals	Apps	Goals	Apps	Goals	Apps	Goals	Apps	Goals	Yellow card	Red card
1	GK	(England) Ben Williams	44	0	5	0	1	0	1	0	51	0	1	0
2	DF	(England) Stephen Darby	47	0	5	0	0	0	1	0	53	0	4	0
3	DF	(Australia) James Meredith	40(3)	1	3	0	0	0	0	0	43(3)	1	3	0
4	MF	(England) Lee Evans	35(1)	4	3	0	0	0	0(1)	0	38(2)	4	10	1
5	DF	(England) Nathan Clarke	20(6)	0	2	0	1	0	1	0	24(6)	0	3	1
6	DF	(Republic of Ireland) Alan Sheehan	2	0	0	0	1	0	0	0	2	0	1	0
7	MF	(Jamaica) Mark Marshall	8(23)	0	2(3)	0	1	0	1	0	12(26)	0	2	0
8	MF	(England) Gary Liddle	17(3)	2	3(1)	1	1	0	1	0	22(4)	3	3	0
9	FW	(England) James Hanson	30(10)	11	4	1	0(1)	1	1	0	35(11)	13	7	0
10	FW	(Republic of Ireland) Billy Clarke	21(8)	4	3(2)	0	0(1)	0	0	0	24(11)	4	0	0
11	MF	(England) Billy Knott	17(7)	0	3	0	0	0	1	1	21(7)	1	3	0
12	MF	(Republic of Ireland) Josh Cullen	18	0	0	0	0	0	0	0	18	0	4	0
14	MF	(England) Josh Morris	7(5)	1	0(2)	0	0(1)	0	0	0	7(8)	1	0	0
15	DF	(England) Greg Leigh	6	1	2	1	0	0	1	0	9	2	1	0
16	DF	(England) Reece Burke	33	2	2	0	0	0	0	0	35	2	4	0
17	MF	(England) Kyel Reid	33(2)	3	3	1	0	0	0	0	36(2)	4	3	0
18	DF	(France) Christopher Routis	9(2)	0	2(1)	0	1	1	0	0	12(3)	1	1	0
19	FW	(England) Jamie Proctor	14(5)	6	0	0	0	0	0	0	13(5)	6	1	0
20	MF	(Portugal) Filipe Morais	3(4)	1	0	0	0	0	0	0	3(4)	1	0	0
21	DF	(England) Tom Thorpe	2(2)	0	0	0	0	0	0	0	2(2)	0	0	0
22	GK	(Australia) Brad Jones	3	0	0	0	0	0	0	0	3	0	0	0
23	DF	(Northern Ireland) Rory McArdle	36	3	5	0	1	0	1	0	43	3	6	0
24	FW	(England) Steve Davies	6(19)	5	0(1)	0	1	0	0(1)	0	7(21)	5	5	0
25	MF	(England) Sam Wright	0	0	0	0	0	0	0	0	0	0	0	0
26	MF	(England) Paul Anderson	5(8)	0	0	0	1	0	0	0	6(8)	0	2	0
27	MF	(England) Joe Brennan	0	0	0	0	0	0	0	0	0	0	0	0
28	MF	(England) Dylan Mottley-Henry	0(1)	0	0	0	0	0	0	0	0(1)	0	0	0
29	DF	(England) Tony McMahon	40(1)	5	5	1	1	0	1	0	47(1)	6	9	0
30	GK	(England) Joe Cracknell	0	0	0	0	0	0	0	0	0	0	0	0
31	DF	(England) James King	0	0	0	0	0	0	0	0	0	0	0	0
33	FW	(England) Luke James	1(8)	0	1(2)	0	1	0	1	0	4(10)	0	0	0
34	FW	(England) Reece Webb-Foster	0	0	0	0	0	0	0	0	0	0	0	0
39	FW	(England) Wes Thomas	6(4)	1	0	0	0	0	0	0	6(4)	1	1	0
44	FW	(England) Devante Cole	12(7)	5	2(2)	1	0	0	0(1)	0	14(10)	6	1	0
-	FW	(United States) Jonathan Lewis	0	0	0	0	0	0	0	0	0	0	0	0
-	FW	(England) Jordan Bowery	1(2)	0	0	0	0	0	0	0	1(2)	0	0	0
-	–	Own goals	–	2	–	0	–	0	–	0	–	2	–	–

Statistics accurate as of 20 May 2016

== Transfers ==
=== Transfers in ===
Date from	Position	Nationality	Name	From	Fee	Ref.
1 July 2015	CF	ENG	Steve Davies	Blackpool	Free transfer	
1 July 2015	LM	ENG	Josh Morris	Blackburn Rovers	Free transfer	
3 July 2015	RB	ENG	Tony McMahon	Blackpool	Free transfer	
7 July 2015	CF	USA	Jonathan Lewis	Fort Lauderdale Strikers	Free transfer	
13 July 2015	LM	JAM	Mark Marshall	Port Vale	Free transfer	
28 July 2015	CB	ENG	Nathan Clarke	Leyton Orient	Free transfer	
1 August 2015	RW	ENG	Paul Anderson	Ipswich Town	Free transfer	
6 August 2015	GK	ENG	Joe Cracknell	Hull City	Free transfer	
6 August 2015	LB	ENG	Greg Leigh	Manchester City	Free transfer	
17 August 2015	GK	AUS	Brad Jones	Liverpool	Free transfer	
28 August 2015	CF	ENG	Devante Cole	Manchester City	Free transfer	
1 February 2016	CF	ENG	Jamie Proctor	Fleetwood Town	Free transfer	

=== Transfers out ===
Date from	Position	Nationality	Name	To	Fee	Ref.
1 July 2015	CB	ENG	Andrew Davies	Ross County	Free transfer	
1 July 2015	DM	ENG	Matthew Dolan	Yeovil Town (Note: Following Dolan's release he joined Yeovil Town.)	Free transfer	
1 July 2015	AM	SCO	Andy Halliday	Rangers	Free transfer	
1 July 2015	CM	ENG	Jason Kennedy	Carlisle United	Free transfer	
1 July 2015	CF	ENG	Aaron McLean	Barnet (Note: Following McLean's release he joined Barnet.)	Released	
1 July 2015	GK	ENG	Matt Urwin	Free Agent	Released	
13 July 2015	CF	SCO	Oli McBurnie	Swansea City	Undisclosed	
25 August 2015	RW	IRL	Mark Yeates	Oldham Athletic	Free transfer	
22 January 2016	CF	ENG	Devante Cole	Fleetwood Town	£75,000	
1 February 2016	MF	ENG	Gary Liddle	Chesterfield	Undisclosed	

=== Loans in ===
Date from	Position	Nationality	Name	From	Date until	Ref.
10 July 2015	CF	ENG	Luke James	Peterborough United	End of season	
20 August 2015	CB	ENG	Reece Burke	West Ham United	20 September 2015	
20 August 2015	CM	WAL	Lee Evans	Wolverhampton Wanderers	9 January 2016	
22 January 2016	CF	ENG	Jamie Proctor	Fleetwood Town	1 February 2016	
29 January 2016	CF	ENG	Wes Thomas	Birmingham City	29 April 2016	

=== Loans out ===
Date from	Position	Nationality	Name	To	Date until	Ref.
25 September 2015	LB	IRL	Alan Sheehan	Notts County	26 December 2015	
26 September 2015	ST	ENG	Jon Lewis	Farsley Celtic	24 October 2015	
22 January 2016	LB	IRL	Alan Sheehan	Luton Town	31 July 2016	
