= Yannick Sagbo =

Ivorian-French footballer (born 1988)

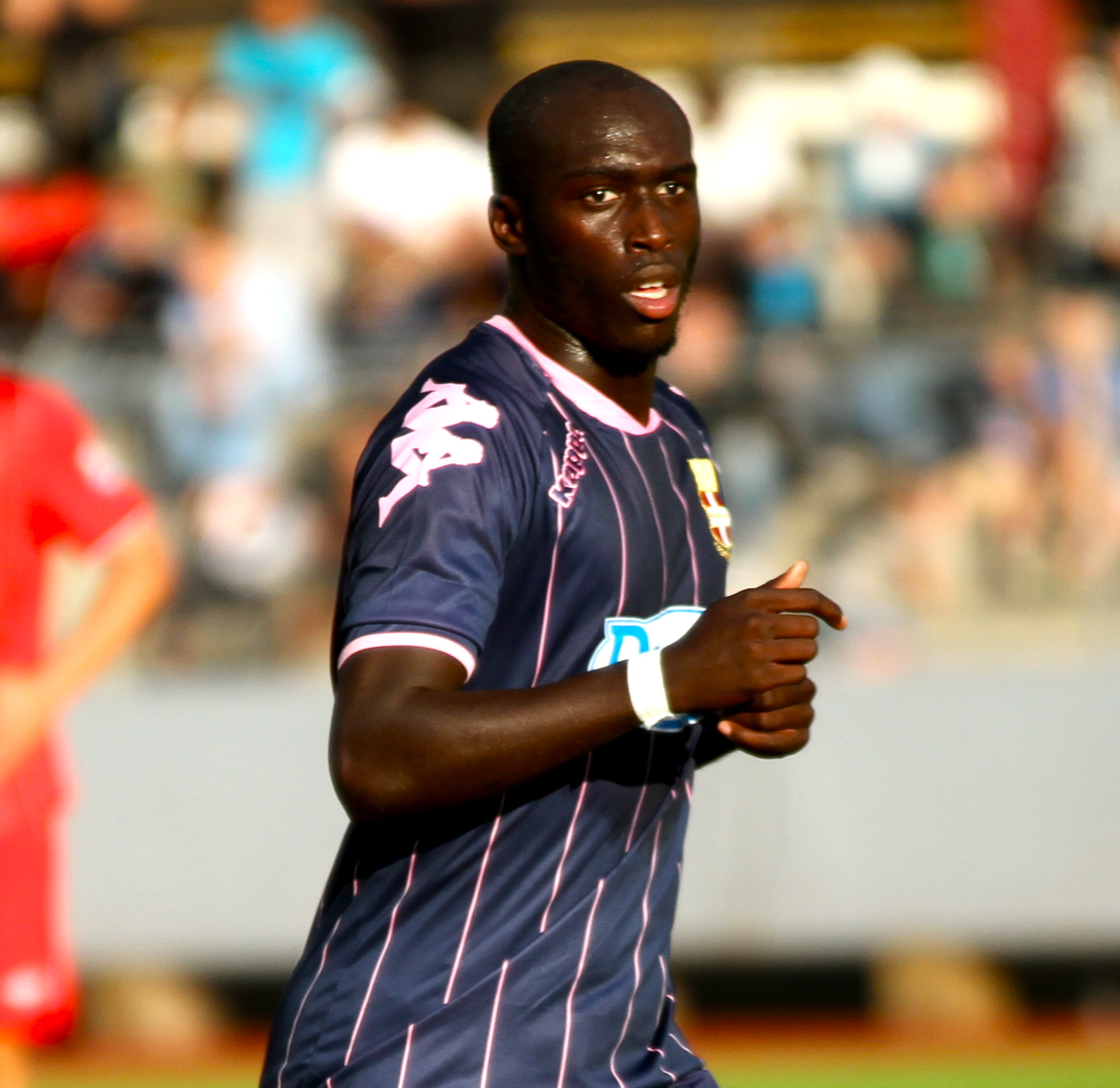
- Sagbo playing for Évian in 2012

Personal information
- Full name: Yannick Anister Sagbo Latte
- Date of birth: 12 April 1988 (age 38)
- Place of birth: Marseille, Bouches-du-Rhône, France
- Height: 1.83 m (6 ft 0 in)
- Position: Striker

Youth career
- 1995–2004: Bouc-Bel-Air
- 2004–2005: Monaco

Senior career*
Years	Team	Apps	(Gls)
2005–2008	Monaco B	53	(15)
2008–2010	Monaco	19	(0)
2010–2013	Évian	99	(25)
2013–2015	Hull City	32	(2)
2014	→ Wolverhampton Wanderers (loan)	4	(0)
2015–2020	Umm Salal	95	(51)
2020	Al-Shamal	8	(3)
2020	Umm Salal	3	(0)
2021	Al-Shamal	6	(2)
2022	Mesaimeer	5	(1)

International career
2010	Ivory Coast U23	5	(2)
2010–2013	Ivory Coast	2	(0)
- * Club domestic league appearances and goals as of 20:03, 15 April 2023 (UTC)

Yannick Anister Sagbo Latte (born 12 April 1988), is a professional footballer who plays as a striker. Born in France, he played for the Ivory Coast at international level.

== Club career ==
=== Early career ===
Sagbo began his football career playing for his local side in SC Air Bel, in Marseille, before joining Monaco during the winter of 2004. He was a part of Monaco's 07–08 CFA squad that won the reserve's professional title (a championship that is reserve for the professional clubs reserves playing in the CFA) scoring 13 goals in 25 matches. Following the season on 13 May 2008, he signed his first professional contract, agreeing to a three-year deal keeping him at the club until 2011.

He officially joined the first-team squad for pre-season in July 2008, where he was handed the number 9 kit. Sagbo made three appearances during the pre-season, starting them all including their opening friendly match against fellow Ligue 1 side Toulouse FC, Croatian side NK Zagreb, and Olympique Marseille. He proceeded to make his professional debut on 8 November 2008 in a 0–1 loss to Olympique Lyonnais, coming on as a substitute playing 17 minutes.

=== Hull City ===
On 26 July 2013, Sagbo signed a two-year contract for an undisclosed fee with English Premier League side Hull City. He made his debut for Hull, on the first day of the 2013–14 season, playing the full 90 minutes in a 2–0 loss away at Chelsea. On 24 August 2013, against Norwich City at the KC Stadium, a confrontation between players saw Sagbo given a straight red card for violent conduct. He scored his first goal in English football on 19 October 2013, away at Everton in a 2–1 defeat, having come on as a substitute. Later in the season, he scored as Hull reached their first-ever FA Cup Final by scoring their first goal in a 5–3 FA Cup semi-final defeat of Sheffield United at Wembley Stadium; he had also scored an equaliser earlier in the competition to prevent their elimination. In the final, which Hull lost to Arsenal, Sagbo was an unused substitute.

At the start of the 2014–15 season, Sagbo featured only once for Hull, in a League Cup exit. Out of contention with the Tigers, he joined Championship side Wolverhampton Wanderers on an emergency loan in September 2014 that was due to last three months and made his club debut on 1 October 2014 in a defeat to Huddersfield Town. However, after three brief substitute appearances, he dropped out of first team contention, with manager Kenny Jackett citing a lack of fitness and the player's failure during his appearances to "state a case for more [gametime]". On 13 November he was recalled by Hull City, two months before his loan was due to expire. Jackett subsequently suggested it had been a mutual decision between the clubs. His contract expired in 2015 and Hull City decided not to extend it.

== International career ==
In January 2008 he was called up for a training camp with the French under-21 futsal team for a 4-day camp.

Sagbo was nominated for the Benin national team on 30 May 2008 against Angola. On 10 August 2010, he made his debut for the Ivory Coast national team against Italy in a friendly game at Upton Park. He came on after 61 minutes for Seydou Doumbia. Ivory Coast won the game 1–0.

== Career statistics ==
As of 11 April 2015

Appearances and goals by club, season and competition
Club	Season	League		National cup		League cup		Europe		Total	
Club	Season	Apps	Goals	Apps	Goals	Apps	Goals	Apps	Goals	Apps	Goals
Monaco B	2005–06	4	0	–		–		–		4	0
Monaco B	2006–07	17	2	–		–		–		17	2
Monaco B	2007–08	20	10	–		–		–		20	10
Monaco B	2008–09	12	3	–		–		–		12	3
Monaco B	Total	53	15	–		–		–		53	15
Monaco	2008–09	3	0	–		–		0	0	3	0
Monaco	2009–10	15	0	–		–		0	0	15	0
Monaco	2010–11	1	0	–		–		0	0	1	0
Monaco	Total	19	0	–		–		0	0	19	0
Évian	2010–11	31	9	–		–		–		31	9
Évian	2011–12	33	10	–		–		–		33	10
Évian	2012–13	35	6	–		–		–		35	6
Évian	Total	99	25	–		–		–		99	25
Hull City	2013–14	28	2	5	2	1	0	—		34	4
Hull City	2014–15	4	0	1	0	1	0	3	0	9	0
Hull City	Total	32	2	6	2	2	0	3	0	43	4
Wolverhampton Wanderers (loan)	2014–15	4	0	0	0	0	0	0	0	4	0
Career total		207	42	6	2	2	0	3	0	218	44

== Honours ==
Hull City

- FA Cup runner-up: 2013–14
