= James King (English footballer) =

English footballer (born 1996)

Personal information
- Date of birth: 27 December 1996 (age 29)
- Position: Central defender

Youth career
- Bradford City

Senior career*
Years	Team	Apps	(Gls)
2016–2017	Bradford City	0	(0)
2017	→ Harrogate Town (loan)		
2017–????	Liversedge		
- * Club domestic league appearances and goals as of 17:20, 26 September 2019 (UTC)

James King (born 27 December 1996) is an English former professional footballer who plays as a central defender.

== Career ==
King began his career at Bradford City, signing a new one-year contract with the club in June 2016. He made his senior debut for the club on 9 November 2016, in an EFL Trophy game against Morecambe, playing out-of-position as a central midfielder. In March 2017 he joined Harrogate Town on loan, whilst still playing for Bradford City's reserves.

In May 2017 it was announced that he would be released by Bradford City at the end of the season, when his contract expired. He went on trial with Barrow, before signing with Liversedge in September 2017. He was still playing with Liversedge in December 2018.

== Career statistics ==
As of 9 November 2016.

Appearances and goals by club, season and competition
Club	Season	League		FA Cup		League Cup		Other		Total	
Club	Season	Apps	Goals	Apps	Goals	Apps	Goals	Apps	Goals	Apps	Goals
Bradford City	2016–17	0	0	0	0	0	0	1	0	1	0
Career total		0	0	0	0	0	0	1	0	1	0
