= Joe Cracknell (footballer) =

English footballer (born 1994)

Personal information
- Full name: Joseph Cracknell
- Date of birth: 28 September 1994 (age 32)
- Place of birth: Kingston upon Hull, England
- Height: 6 ft 0 in (1.83 m)
- Position: Goalkeeper

Team information
- Current team: Guiseley

Youth career
- –2014: Hull City

Senior career*
Years	Team	Apps	(Gls)
2014–2015	Hull City	0	(0)
2014	→ Scarborough Athletic (loan)		
2015–2017	Bradford City	0	(0)
2015	→ Scarborough Athletic (loan)		
2016	→ Bradford (Park Avenue) (loan)	7	(0)
2017–2022	Harrogate Town	10	(0)
2022–2024	Scarborough Athletic	56	(0)
2024–	Guiseley	36	(0)
- * Club domestic league appearances and goals as of 21:23, 26 March 2025 (UTC)

Joseph Cracknell (born 28 September 1994) is an English professional footballer who plays as a goalkeeper for Guiseley. After playing for Hull City, Scarborough Athletic, Bradford City and Bradford (Park Avenue), he signed for Harrogate Town in August 2017.

== Career ==
Born in Kingston upon Hull, Cracknell played for Hull City at youth level, and had a spell on loan at Scarborough Athletic, before signing for Bradford City in the summer of 2015 following a trial period at the club. Whilst at Bradford City, Cracknell had loan a second loan spell at Scarborough Athletic and later joined Bradford (Park Avenue) on loan, where he made 7 league appearances.

He signed for Harrogate Town in August 2017. He made his professional debut for Harrogate Town on 5 September 2020 in a 1–1 EFL Cup draw with Tranmere Rovers, in which Harrogate won the penalty shoot-out. He was released by Harrogate in summer 2022.

He signed for Scarborough Athletic in August 2022.

On 13 June 2024, Cracknell joined Northern Premier League Premier Division side Guiseley.

== Career statistics ==
As of match played 22 March 2025

Appearances and goals by club, season and competition
Club	Season	League			FA Cup		League Cup		Other		Total	
Club	Season	Division	Apps	Goals	Apps	Goals	Apps	Goals	Apps	Goals	Apps	Goals
Bradford City	2015–16	League One	0	0	0	0	0	0	0	0	0	0
Bradford City	2016–17	League One	0	0	0	0	0	0	0	0	0	0
Bradford City	Total		0	0	0	0	0	0	0	0	0	0
Bradford (Park Avenue)	2016–17	National League North	7	0	0	0	—		0	0	7	0
Harrogate Town	2017–18	National League North	1	0	0	0	—		2 (Note: Appearance(s) in FA Trophy)	0	3	0
Harrogate Town	2018–19	National League	1	0	0	0	—		0	0	1	0
Harrogate Town	2019–20	National League	0	0	0	0	—		6	0	6	0
Harrogate Town	2020–21	League Two	8	0	1	0	2	0	2 (Note: Appearance(s) in EFL Trophy)	0	13	0
Harrogate Town	2021–22	League Two	6	0	0	0	0	0	2	0	8	0
Harrogate Town	Total		16	0	1	0	2	0	12	0	31	0
Scarborough Athletic	2022–23	National League North	46	0	0	0	–		1	0	47	0
Scarborough Athletic	2023–24	National League North	10	0	2	0	–		0	0	12	0
Scarborough Athletic	Total		56	0	2	0	–		1	0	59	0
Guiseley	2024–25	Northern Premier League Premier Division	36	0	5	0	–		1	0	42	0
Career total			115	0	8	0	2	0	14	0	139	0

== Honours ==
Harrogate Town

- FA Trophy: 2019–20
