= List of Bradford City A.F.C. records and statistics =

These are a list of player and club records for Bradford City Association Football Club.

== Honours ==
=== League ===
- Division One
  - Runners-up (1): 1998–99
- Division Two
  - Winners (1): 1907–08
  - Play-off winners (1): 1995–96
- Division Three
  - Winners (1): 1984–85
- Division Three (North)
  - Winners (1): 1928–29
- Division Four
  - Winners (1): 2024–25
  - Runners-up (1): 1981–82

=== Cup ===
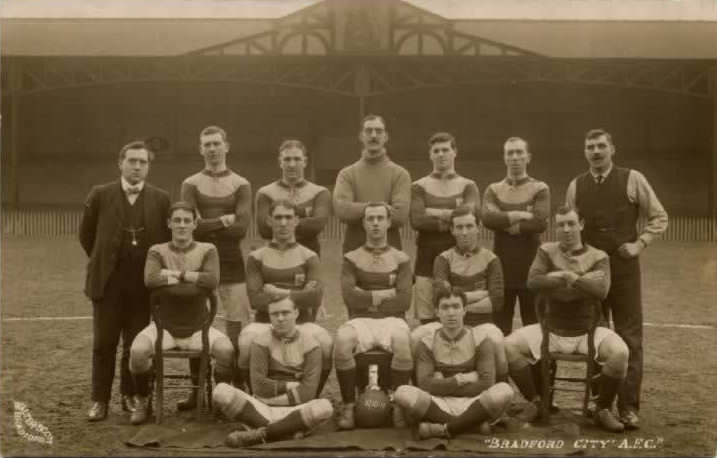
The Bradford City team which won the 1911 FA Cup

- FA Cup
  - Winners (1): 1911
- Football League Cup
  - Runners-up(1): 2013
- Third Division North Challenge Cup
  - Winners (1): 1939
  - Runners-up (1): 1938

== Player records ==
=== Youngest and oldest ===
- Youngest player: 15 years 332 days – Reece Staunton v Rotherham United, 7 November 2017.
- Oldest player: 41 years 178 days – Neville Southall v Leeds United, 12 March 2000.

=== Most appearances ===
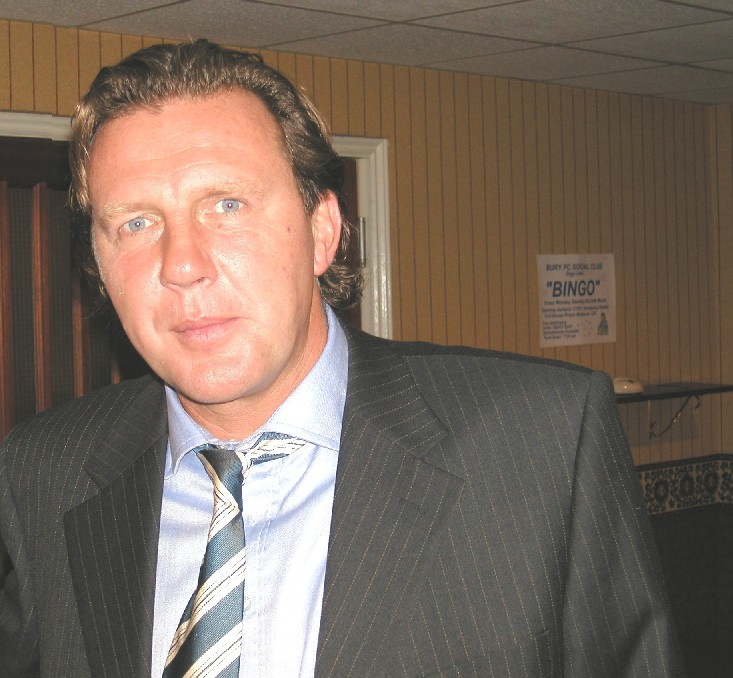
Peter Jackson, who is eighth on the list of appearances for Bradford City with 336 appearances in two spells.

The following players have played more than 300 league appearances for Bradford City.

	Name	Nation	Apps	Career	Notes
1	Ces Podd	Saint Kitts and Nevis	502	1970–1984	
2	Ian Cooper	England	443	1965–1977	
3	John Hall	England	430	1962–1974	
4	Bruce Stowell	England	401	1960–1972	
5	Stuart McCall	Scotland	395	1982–1988, 1998–2002	
6	George Robinson	England	343	1903–1915	
7	Charlie Moore	England	339	1926–1939	
8	Peter Jackson	England	336	1979–1986, 1988–1990	
9	Billy Watson	Scotland	330	1921–1930	
10	Wayne Jacobs	England	318	1994–2005	
11	Gavin Oliver	England	313	1985–1994	
12	David Wetherall	England	304	1999–2008	
13	Dicky Bond	England	301	1909–1922	

- Most appearances : 574 – Ces Podd.

=== Goalscorers ===
- Most goals in a season: 36 – David Layne, 1961–62.
- Most league goals in a season: 34 – David Layne, 1961–62.
- Most goals scored in a match: 7 – Albert Whitehurst v Tranmere Rovers, Division Three (North), 6 March 1929.
- Most goals scored : 143 – Bobby Campbell.

=== Top goalscorers ===
The following players have scored more than 60 league goals for Bradford City.

	Name	Nation	Goals	Apps	Avge	Career	Notes
1	Bobby Campbell	Northern Ireland	121	274	0.44	1979–1983, 1983–1986	
2	James Hanson	England	91	274	0.33	2009–2017	
3	Frank O'Rourke	Scotland	88	192	0.46	1907–1914	
4	Andy Cook	England	87	193	0.45	2021–present	
5	Dean Windass	England	76	216	0.35	1999–2001, 2003–2007	
6	John Hallows	England	74	164	0.45	1930–1936	
7	Joe Cooke	Dominica	68	271	0.25	1971–1979, 1981–1984	
8	Gerry Ingram	England	64	174	0.37	1971–1977	
9	Bobby Ham	England	64	188	0.34	1967–1971, 1973–1975	
10	David McNiven	Scotland	64	212	0.30	1978–1983	
11	Sean McCarthy	Wales	63	131	0.48	1990–1994	
12	John Hall	England	63	430	0.15	1962–1974	
13	David Jackson	England	61	250	0.24	1955–1961	
14	Bruce Bannister	England	60	208	0.29	1965–1971	
15	Dicky Bond	England	60	301	0.20	1909–1922	

=== Transfers ===
==== Record transfer fees paid ====
The following players are all the players for whom Bradford City have paid at least £1 million.

#	Name	Fee	Paid to	Date	Notes
1	(Scotland) David Hopkin	£2.5m	Leeds United	6 July 2000	
2	(England) Ashley Ward	£1.5m	Blackburn Rovers	18 August 2000	
3	(England) David Wetherall	£1.4m	Leeds United	1 July 1999	
4	(England) Isaiah Rankin	£1.3m	Arsenal	14 August 1998	
5	(England) Lee Mills	£1m	Port Vale	7 August 1998	
5	(England) Dean Windass	£1m	Oxford United	4 March 1999	

==== Record transfer fees received ====
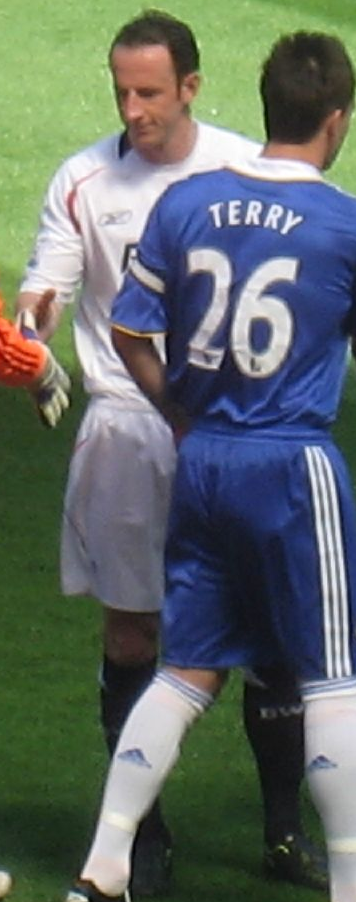
Andy O'Brien, who signed for Newcastle United in a record-breaking £2 million sale

- Highest transfer fee received: £2 million – Des Hamilton, to Newcastle United, March 1997.
- £2 million – Andy O'Brien, to Newcastle United, March 2001.

== Managerial records ==
- First manager: Robert Campbell (managed the club for 79 matches from June 1903 to October 1905).
- Longest serving manager: Peter O'Rourke (managed the club for 497 matches from November 1905 to June 1921).

== Club records ==
=== Goals ===
- Most league goals scored in a season: 128 in 42 matches – Division Three (North), 1928–29.
- Fewest league goals scored in a season: 30 in 38 matches – Premiership, 2000–01.
- Most league goals conceded in a season: 94 in 42 matches – Division Two, 1936–37.
- 94 in 46 matches – Division Four, 1965–66.
- Fewest league goals conceded in a season: 40 in 46 matches – League One, 2015 - 16.

=== Points ===
- Most points in a season
  - Two points for a win: 63 in 42 matches – Division Three (North), 1928–29.
  - Three points for a win: 94 in 46 matches – Division Three, 1984–85.
- Fewest points in a season
  - Two points for a win: 23 in 42 matches – Division Two, 1926–27.
  - Three points for a win: 26 in 38 matches – Premiership, 2000–01.

=== Matches ===
==== Firsts ====
- First league match: Grimsby Town 2–0 Bradford City, Division Two at Blundell Park, 1 September 1903.
- First FA Cup match: Bradford City 6–1 Rockingham Colliery, first round qualifying at Valley Parade, 3 October 1903.
- First League Cup match: Bradford City 2–1 Manchester United, second round at Valley Parade, 2 November 1960.
- First European match: FK Atlantas 1–3 Bradford City, Intertoto Cup second round at Žalgiris Stadium, 2 July 2000.

==== Record victories ====
- Record league victory: 11–1 v Rotherham United, Division Three (North), 25 August 1928.
- Record FA Cup victory: 11–3 v Walker Celtic, first round replay, 1 December 1937.
- Record League Cup victory: 7–2 v Darlington, second round second leg, 25 September 2000.

==== Record defeats ====
- Record league defeat: 0–8 v Manchester City, Division Two, 7 May 1927.
- 1–9 v Colchester United, Division Four, 30 December 1961.
- Record FA Cup defeat: 1–6 v Newcastle United, third round, 7 March 1963.
- 0–5 v Burnley, fifth round replay, 3 February 1960.
- 0–5 v Tottenham Hotspur, third round, 7 January 1970.

=== Record consecutive results ===
- Record consecutive wins: 10 – (from 26 November 1983 to 3 February 1984.
- Record consecutive defeats: 8 – (21 January 1933 to 11 March 1933.
- Record consecutive games without a defeat: 21 – (from 11 January 1969 to 2 May 1969).
- Record consecutive games without a win: 16 – (from 28 August 1948 to 20 November 1948).

=== Attendances ===
- Highest attendance at home match (Valley Parade): 39,146 v Burnley, FA Cup fourth round, 11 March 1911.
- Lowest attendance at home match (Valley Parade): 931 v Rotherham United, English Football League Trophy, 7 November 2017.
- Record gate receipts: £181,990 v Manchester United, Premiership, 13 January 2001.

== European record ==
Bradford City's record in European competitions is limited to the 2000 Intertoto Cup, for which they took England's second place.

Season	Competition	Round	Country	Club	Home	Away	Notes
2000	UEFA Intertoto Cup	2R	Lithuania	FK Atlantas	4–1	3–1	
2000	UEFA Intertoto Cup	3R	Netherlands	RKC Waalwijk	2–0	1–0	
2000	UEFA Intertoto Cup	SF	Russia	FC Zenit St. Petersburg	0–3	0–1	
