= List of Bradford City A.F.C. managers =

Bradford City Association Football Club's first manager was Robert Campbell, who was given the role upon the club's election into the league in 1903 although the club was administered by a 13-man sub-committee. He left by mutual consent in 1905 to be succeeded by the club's most successful manager Peter O'Rourke in the first of two periods in charge of the club. O'Rourke's first spell as manager lasted 16 years, during which time he oversaw the club's first title and promotion in 1907–08 and the FA Cup success of 1911. David Menzies took over in 1921, but the club was relegated the following year. The club continued to struggle and Menzies' successor Colin Veitch oversaw a second relegation in 1926–27 before O'Rourke returned to the club. During his second spell he brought the Division Three (North) title in 1928–29 when the club set some records which remain today. O'Rourke resigned in 1930 to be succeeded by first Jack Peart then Dick Ray but the club were again relegated in 1936–37.

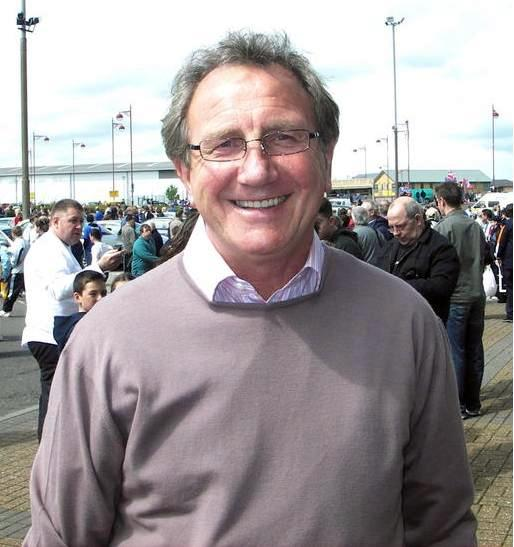
Roy McFarland launched the club's revival during the 1980s.

For half a century, City remained in the bottom two divisions of the Football League under a succession of managers until the 1980s brought an upturn in the club's fortunes. Former England international Roy McFarland was appointed player-manager in 1981, bringing instant success with promotion from Division Four in 1981–82. But he left in controversial circumstances to Derby County, to be replaced by another England international Trevor Cherry as player-manager from rivals Leeds United. Cherry oversaw a turbulent period at the club, which included City going into liquidation in 1983, the Division Three title in 1984–85 and the tragic fire on 11 May 1985. He was only the third City manager to win a trophy.

Cherry was sacked just one month after the club returned to Valley Parade in a move which shocked the Bradford public. His successor was first team coach Terry Dolan, who had played for the club for five years making nearly 200 league appearances. With the fans still singing Cherry's name, Dolan quickly won over the fans with a 5–1 FA Cup victory over Oldham Athletic in his first game, before guiding the club away from relegation and a 10th-place finish in 1986–87. The following season a final day defeat to Ipswich Town then failure in the play-offs against Middlesbrough prevented Dolan from taking the club into the top flight for the first time in 66 years. He was unable to replace star players Stuart McCall and John Hendrie, who left during the summer, and was sacked to be replaced by Welsh manager Terry Yorath but relegation followed in 1989–90.

John Docherty had taken over two months before relegation was confirmed. During the 1990 close season he signed Sean McCarthy to solve the club's goal-scoring problem, and a number of his former players from Millwall but he could not help City bounce back. He was replaced by Frank Stapleton, who also failed to deliver promotion before new chairman Geoffrey Richmond bought the club. Richmond's first appointment was experienced manager Lennie Lawrence, who had made a solid start to the 1995–96 season before he was enticed away to Luton Town. Richmond appointed assistant Chris Kamara, who took City to promotion via the play-offs following a run of results at the end of the season, taking 28 points from a possible 39 to edge Chesterfield out of the play-off places by just one point. A 2–0 victory in the final against Notts County meant City and Luton Town swapped divisions.

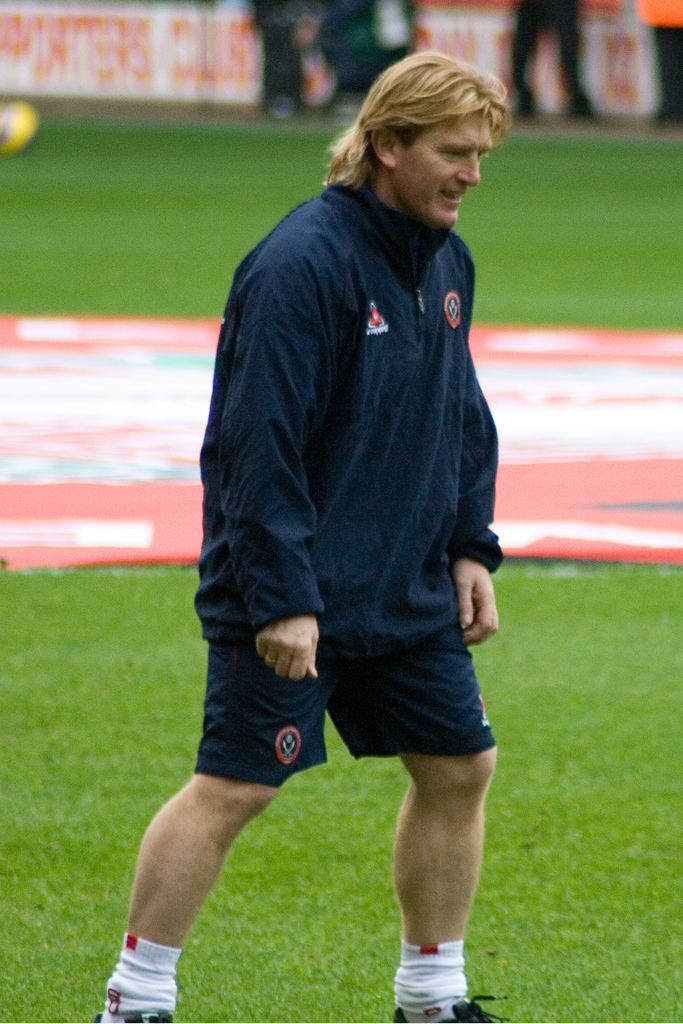
Stuart McCall, who was caretaker manager in the Premier League and later served as full-time manager from 2007 to 2010

Kamara was also succeeded by his own assistant Paul Jewell originally on a temporary basis before the striker, who had been at the club since 1988, was given the job permanently in the summer of 1998. Richmond gave Jewell the biggest transfer budget in the club's history. Jewell signed the club's first three £1million players to mastermind Bradford's return to the top flight in his first full season. He then defied the critics by keeping the club in the Premiership with a 1–0 victory over the club where he had begun his career Liverpool. Jewell made a shock exit from the club after a disagreement with Richmond, who made his third successive appointment from within the club by elevating Chris Hutchings to the manager's seat. Hutchings was given unprecedented money for a Bradford manager to spend on a series of talented players including record signing David Hopkin, Benito Carbone and Dan Petrescu but he was sacked after 137 days and just one win from 12 league games.

The money Hutchings was given, combined with the collapse of ITV Digital continued to have repercussions on the club's league position and finances long after he had left. Three relegations have followed with a succession of respected managers, including Jim Jefferies, former England captain Bryan Robson and Colin Todd unable to stop the club from dropping through the league. Having stated in his autobiography that he would one day "love to manage Bradford", Stuart McCall, who had two playing spells at the club, came from Sheffield United on 22 May 2007 to become the club's 38th full-time manager. McCall was given a two-year contract and promised to deliver promotion in his first season. He later changed his judgment and aimed at promotion in his second season; when he again failed he offered to resign, but stayed on for a third campaign. He left in February 2010 and was replaced by Peter Taylor. Taylor's reign lasted only a year before he resigned after criticism from fans, to be replaced by Peter Jackson. Jackson staved off relegation to the Football Conference, which was looking a possibility when Taylor resigned, but his reign proved to be even shorter-lived and he resigned after just six months in charge, with the lowest win percentage of any permanent manager in the club's history. Phil Parkinson succeeded Jackson and won another relegation battle, before bringing about a major revival in the club's fortunes the following year, taking the side to the final of the League Cup before winning promotion back to League One via the play-offs.

== Managers ==
As of 24 February 2022
Only professional, competitive matches are counted.

Name	Nationality	From	To	P	W	D	L	Win % (Note: Winning percentage is correct to two decimal places.)	Honours	Notes
Robert Campbell	Scotland	20 June 1903	31 October 1905	79	29	18	32	36.71		
Peter O'Rourke	Scotland	1 November 1905	30 June 1921	497	204	121	172	41.05	Division Two champions 1907–08; FA Cup winners 1911	
David Menzies	Scotland	1 July 1921	1 June 1926	222	63	64	95	28.38		
Colin Veitch	England	1 August 1926	14 January 1928	65	14	17	34	21.54		
Jack Foster	England	14 January 1928	5 May 1928	19	10	4	5	52.63		(Note: Caretaker manager)
Peter O'Rourke	Scotland	6 May 1928	1 May 1930	92	43	22	27	46.74	Division Three (North) champions 1928–29	
Jack Peart	England	1 July 1930	1 March 1935	208	79	52	77	37.98		
Dick Ray	England	1 April 1935	28 February 1937	86	27	23	36	31.40		
Fred Westgarth	England	1 March 1938	1 July 1943	56	26	14	16	46.43	Third Division North Cup champions 1938–39	
Bob Sharp	England	1 July 1943	1 May 1946	2	0	1	1	0.00		
Jack Barker	England	1 May 1946	1 January 1947	23	10	6	7	43.48		
Jack Milburn	England	1 January 1947	1 July 1948	64	26	14	24	40.63		
David Steele	Scotland	1 July 1948	1 February 1952	167	57	34	76	34.13		
Albert Harris	England	1 February 1952	1 May 1952	17	5	4	8	29.41		
Ivor Powell	Wales	1 May 1952	1 February 1955	129	46	38	45	35.66		
Peter Jackson	England	1 February 1955	1 March 1961	305	118	80	107	38.69		
Bob Brocklebank	England	1 May 1961	1 October 1964	157	62	30	65	39.49		
Bill Harris	Wales	1 March 1965	31 March 1966	45	15	9	21	33.33		
Willie Watson	England	1 April 1966	1 January 1967	128	51	37	40	39.84		
Grenville Hair	England	1 January 1967	7 March 1968	55	27	10	18	49.09		
Jim McAnearney Tom Hallett	England	7 March 1968	31 May 1968	12	5	5	2	41.67		(Note: Joint caretaker managers)
Jimmy Wheeler	England	1 June 1968	7 September 1971	144	49	46	49	34.03		
Ray Wilson	England	1 September 1971	1 November 1971	10	5	2	3	50.00		
Bryan Edwards	England	1 November 1971	17 January 1975	154	51	38	65	33.12		
Bobby Kennedy	Scotland	1 January 1975	31 January 1978	138	46	46	46	33.33		
John Napier	Northern Ireland	1 February 1978	31 October 1978	34	11	5	18	32.35		
George Mulhall	Scotland	1 November 1978	1 March 1981	115	48	33	34	41.74		
Roy McFarland	England	1 May 1981	22 November 1982	64	35	16	13	54.69		
Trevor Cherry	England	1 December 1982	5 January 1987	201	83	44	74	41.29	Division Three champions 1984–85	
Terry Dolan	England	5 January 1987	30 January 1989	112	51	30	31	45.54		
Terry Yorath	Wales	2 February 1989	7 March 1990	57	13	20	24	22.81		
John Docherty	Scotland	20 March 1990	11 November 1991	83	29	22	32	34.94		
Frank Stapleton	Republic of Ireland	9 December 1991	2 May 1994	129	47	43	39	36.43		
Lennie Lawrence	England	25 May 1994	27 November 1995	77	29	20	28	37.66		
Chris Kamara	England	27 November 1995	6 January 1998	112	40	26	46	35.71	Second Division play-off winners: 1995–96	
Paul Jewell	England	6 January 1998	18 June 2000	117	46	26	45	39.32		
Chris Hutchings	England	18 June 2000	6 November 2000	21	7	4	10	33.33		
Stuart McCall	Scotland	6 November 2000	20 November 2000	2	0	0	2	0.00		
Jim Jefferies	Scotland	20 November 2000	24 December 2001	53	15	12	26	28.30		
Steve Smith	England	24 December 2001	31 December 2001	2	0	0	2	0.00		
Nicky Law	England	1 January 2002	9 November 2003	87	23	21	43	26.44		
Senior players	England	9 November 2003	23 November 2003	1	0	0	1	0.00		(Note: Senior players Peter Atherton, Wayne Jacobs, David Wetherall and Dean Windass took temporary charge.)
Bryan Robson	England	24 November 2003	17 June 2004	28	7	1	20	25.00		
Colin Todd	England	18 June 2004	12 February 2007	139	44	46	49	31.65		
David Wetherall	England	12 February 2007	22 May 2007	14	2	4	8	14.29		
Stuart McCall	Scotland	22 May 2007	8 February 2010	133	46	35	52	34.59		
Wayne Jacobs	England	8 February 2010	16 February 2010	1	0	1	0	0.00		
Peter Taylor	England	17 February 2010	26 February 2011	25	10	5	10	40.00		
Peter Jackson	England	27 February 2011	25 August 2011	19	4	4	11	21.05		
Colin Cooper	England	25 August 2011	29 August 2011	2	1	1	0	50.00		
Phil Parkinson	England	29 August 2011	10 June 2016	274	101	86	87	36.86	League Two play-off winners: 2012–13	
Stuart McCall	Scotland	20 June 2016	5 February 2018	96	44	24	28	45.83		
Greg Abbott	England	5 February 2018	11 February 2018	1	0	1	0	0.00		
Simon Grayson	England	11 February 2018	8 May 2018	14	3	5	6	21.43		
Michael Collins	Republic of Ireland	18 June 2018	3 September 2018	7	2	1	4	28.57		
David Hopkin	Scotland	4 September 2018	25 February 2019	35	7	11	17	20.00		
Martin Drury	England	25 February 2019	4 March 2019	1	0	1	0	0.00		
Gary Bowyer	England	4 March 2019	3 February 2020	48	14	15	19	29.17		
Stuart McCall	Scotland	4 February 2020	13 December 2020	28	7	7	14	25.00		
Mark Trueman Conor Sellars	England	13 December 2020	10 May 2021	31	14	7	10	45.16		
Derek Adams	Scotland	4 June 2021	15 February 2022	37	9	15	13	24.32		
Mark Trueman	England	15 February 2022	24 February 2022	2	0	0	2	0.00		
Mark Hughes	Wales	24 February 2022	4 October 2023	82	31	26	25	37.80		
Kevin McDonald	Scotland	4 October 2023	31 October 2023	0	0	0	0	—		
Mark Trueman	England	31 October 2023	6 November 2023	0	0	0	0	—		
Graham Alexander	Scotland	6 November 2023	28 September 2026	107	56	24	27	52.34		
