= George Mulholland (footballer) =

Scottish footballer (1928–2001)

Personal information
- Date of birth: 4 August 1928
- Place of birth: Ayr, Scotland
- Date of death: December 2001 (aged 73)
- Place of death: Stockton-on-Tees, England
- Position: Full back

Senior career*
Years	Team	Apps	(Gls)
1950–1953	Stoke City	3	(0)
1953–1960	Bradford City	277	(0)
1960–1963	Darlington	106	(0)
1963–1966	Billingham Synthonia		
Total		386	(0)
- * Club domestic league appearances and goals

George Rush Mulholland (4 August 1928 – December 2001) was a Scottish professional footballer who played more than 400 games for league clubs Stoke City, Bradford City and Darlington.

== Early life ==
Mulholland was born in Ayr, Scotland on 4 August 1928. He moved to the Potteries with his family when he was aged two-years-old. Mulholland served in the Royal Navy during the Second World War before he returned to the Stoke area.

== Football career ==
Mulholland signed for Stoke City as an amateur during the 1949–50 season initially as a forward. He became a full-time professional in July 1950 but made only three league appearances in three years and was signed by Bradford City manager Ivor Powell on a free transfer in July 1953.

Mulholland was turned into a full back by Powell and handed his debut on 29 August 1953 against Chesterfield. He played the remaining 43 games of the 1953–54 season as Bradford finished fifth in Division Three (North). He was then an ever-present in the City side for the following four seasons, failing to miss a league or cup game for the club until he fractured his leg 12 minutes from the end of a game against Mansfield Town on 1 September 1958. His run of 237 league games, and 246 in total, broke the club's record of consecutive appearances held by another full back Charlie Bicknell. The run coincided with goalkeeper Geoff Smith, who played 200 consecutive league games between 1954 and 1958. Mulholland returned to the side in November 1958, playing 22 during the 1958–59 season and a further 28 the following season. During his stay at Bradford, he had just two partners at full back—Jock Whyte and Tommy Flockett. He was renowned for his pace, and functions to defend and mark the opposition winger, and has been inaugurated into the club's hall of fame.

In July 1960, Mulholland was given a free transfer to Darlington where he played another 106 league games, finishing his professional career with 386 league games but without scoring. His time at Darlington also included a game in front of a club record crowd of 21,023 in a 2–1 defeat to Bolton Wanderers on 14 November 1960. He retired from the professional ranks in 1963, and played for non-league side Billingham Synthonia before he retired three years later.

== Post-football career ==
Mulholland retired to Billingham, where he held a number of jobs, including at ICI, as a school teacher and an insurance agent. He died in Stockton-on-Tees in December 2001 at the age of 73, after a four-year battle with cancer.

== Career statistics ==
- Sourced from George Mulholland at the English National Football Archive (subscription required)

Club	Season	League			FA Cup		League Cup		Total	
Club	Season	Division	Apps	Goals	Apps	Goals	Apps	Goals	Apps	Goals
Stoke City	1950–51	First Division	3	0	0	0	–		3	0
Stoke City	1951–52	First Division	0	0	0	0	–		0	0
Stoke City	1952–53	First Division	0	0	0	0	–		0	0
Stoke City	Total		3	0	0	0	–		3	0
Bradford City	1953–54	Third Division North	43	0	2	0	–		45	0
Bradford City	1954–55	Third Division North	46	0	5	0	–		51	0
Bradford City	1955–56	Third Division North	46	0	3	0	–		49	0
Bradford City	1956–57	Third Division North	46	0	1	0	–		47	0
Bradford City	1957–58	Third Division North	46	0	4	0	–		50	0
Bradford City	1958–59	Third Division	22	0	4	0	–		26	0
Bradford City	1959–60	Third Division	28	0	8	0	–		36	0
Bradford City	Total		277	0	27	0	–		304	0
Darlington	1960–61	Fourth Division	45	0	6	0	3	0	54	0
Darlington	1961–62	Fourth Division	41	0	0	0	2	0	43	0
Darlington	1962–63	Fourth Division	20	0	0	0	1	0	21	0
Darlington	Total		106	0	6	0	6	0	118	0
Career Total			386	0	33	0	6	0	425	0
