= Geoff Smith (footballer, born 1928) =

English footballer

Personal information
- Full name: Geoffrey Smith
- Date of birth: 14 March 1928
- Place of birth: Cottingley, Bradford, England
- Date of death: 19 October 2013 (aged 85)
- Place of death: Keighley, England
- Position: Goalkeeper

Youth career
- St Anne's Church
- Keighley Central Club

Senior career*
Years	Team	Apps	(Gls)
- Nelson
- Rossendale United
1952–1959	Bradford City	253	(0)
- * Club domestic league appearances and goals

Geoffrey Smith (14 March 1928 – 19 October 2013) was an English professional footballer who played 253 league games for Bradford City as a goalkeeper, including 200 consecutive appearances. When he retired, he held club records for the number of clean sheets in a season and total clean sheets.

Smith was born in Cottingley, Bradford, West Riding of Yorkshire, moved to nearby Keighley with his family before serving in Malaya in the British Army at the end of his teens. His first trial at Bradford City was unsuccessful but after playing amateur football for Lancashire Combination League sides Nelson and Rossendale United, he was signed by Bradford's new manager Ivor Powell in 1952. He was at Bradford City for seven seasons and played in every league game between the final match of the 1953–54 season and October 1958. He eventually retired in 1959. After his football career, Smith and his wife ran two different off-licences for the remainder of their working life.

== Early life ==
Smith was born in Cottingley on the outskirts of Bradford, West Riding of Yorkshire, on 14 March 1928. He had a brother Jack and during their childhood, the Smith family moved to Keighley, where Smith first played football for St Anne's Church. At the age of 18, Smith was called up to the army. He served in an infantry unit in Malaya for two years before he returned to Keighley.

== Football career ==
=== Early career ===
Smith resumed his football career back at home with Keighley Central Club. A goalkeeper, he was still playing for Keighley Central in 1948 when he was offered a trial with his local Football League side Bradford City, who were at the time in the Third Division North. His trial was unsuccessful and he was released. Instead, Smith joined Lancashire Combination League side Nelson. He was still living in Keighley, and travelled to Nelson by bus with his brother Jack, who had previously played for Leeds United but had been released when Major Frank Buckley took over as manager and instead also joined Nelson. Smith played for Nelson for three years at a time when the club were competing at the top of the Lancashire Combination and sought re-election back into the Football League. However, Smith initially gave up the game when Nelson could no longer afford to pay him. He was not long out of the game before he signed Rossendale United, a member of the Lancashire Combination's Second Division. Smith said the journey by bus was a difficult one so he bought a motorbike. However, like Nelson, Rossendale could not afford to pay him, and after another two years, Smith gave up the game once again.

=== Bradford City ===
In December 1952, on the advice of Smith's friend Roy Brook, who was in Bradford's second team, new Bradford City manager Ivor Powell invited Smith back to City for another trial and he played for the reserves against Gainsborough Trinity and Notts County. This time, Smith's trial was successful and Bradford City – still a Third Division North side – signed him on amateur forms. Smith had played only seven games for the reserves in the Midland League and was still unpaid when he was given his first-team debut against Scunthorpe United on 17 January 1953 coming into the side for Brendan McManus, whom Smith said was "having a rough time". It was not a good start for Smith, with City losing 4–0, but he followed this with a clean sheet in his second game against Stockport County and kept his place in the side for the remainder of the season, playing 19 games, before he signed part-time professional terms in July 1953. He had previously worked part-time as a lorry driver, earning £4 10s (£4.50) working 48 hours per week as a lorry driver, but the club did not want him driving around the country and offered him £10 per week plus a £4 win bonus. To supplement his playing contract, the club gave Smith a job looking after their Valley Parade ground.

During the mid-season break, McManus left City to join Frickley Athletic. Instead, Powell signed Jimmy Gooch from Preston North End as his replacement. Gooch, aged 32, was more experienced than Smith and so took over as first-choice goalkeeper at the start of the 1953–54 season playing the first 20 games. Smith was called up to the first-team in November for a 1–1 draw with Hartlepools United. He remained in the side and played all but two games for the rest of the season, coming back into the team for the final league game of the season against Gateshead as City finished fifth. He kept 11 clean sheets, which included equalling a club best five in consecutive matches as City won a record nine straight games, during which they conceded just one goal.

Gooch left City after just one season to join Watford leaving Smith to take over the "number one" shirt. For the next four seasons, Smith, who became a full-time professional, played every single first-team game for City which eventually led to him making 200 consecutive league appearances – it was a run that coincided with one of 246 league and FA Cup games by full back George Mulholland. However, for three seasons, City could not match the fifth place gained in 1953–54 and they remained a Third Division North side. In 1957–58, under Powell's replacement as manager Peter Jackson, City finished in third place but missed out on the title by nine points to Scunthorpe United. During the season, Smith set a new club record of 18 clean sheets, one which was later equalled by Steve Smith and Eric McManus.

The following season, Smith's run of consecutive games came to an end against Reading in October 1958, with Jim McCusker coming into the side to replace him for two games. Smith's number of consecutive appearances is third on the club's list behind Mulholland's 231 games and Charlie Bicknell. He played 26 further games in the 1958–59 season, in which the club finished 11th in the newly formed Third Division. The season proved to be Smith's final season for City as he decided to retire aged 31. His last game was a 2–1 defeat, once again versus Reading, on 28 February 1959. When the season finished, Smith had played a total of 270 games for the club, 253 of which came in the league, keeping a club record 70 clean sheets. His record stood until it was broken by Paul Tomlinson in the 1990s. When Smith retired, the club granted him and Mulholland each a sum of money rather than the proceeds of a benefit match.

== Personal life ==
Smith met his wife Margaret at a ceilidh at St Anne's Social Club, in Keighley, in 1944, when they were both teenagers. They married after Smith returned from his two years in the army on 26 August 1950 at Holy Trinity Church, in Keighley. Together, they had two daughters. Smith had been a motor mechanic before his football career, and after he retired from playing, he and his wife ran an off-licence store in Cross Roads for 25 years and a newsagents in Keighley for another five years. Smith played bowls and golf in his retirement, playing for Skipton Vets in the former sport.

Smith died on 19 October 2013.

== Career statistics ==
Club	Division	Season	League		FA Cup		Total	
Club	Division	Season	Apps	Goals	Apps	Goals	Apps	Goals
Nelson	Lancashire Combination							
Rossendale United	Lancashire Combination Second Division							
Bradford City	Third Division North	1952–53	19	0	0	0	19	0
Bradford City	Third Division North	1953–54	24	0	0	0	24	0
Bradford City	Third Division North	1954–55	46	0	5	0	51	0
Bradford City	Third Division North	1955–56	46	0	3	0	49	0
Bradford City	Third Division North	1956–57	46	0	1	0	47	0
Bradford City	Third Division North	1957–58	46	0	4	0	50	0
Bradford City	Third Division	1958–59	26	0	4	0	30	0
Bradford City	Total		253	0	17	0	270	0
Career totals			253	0	17	0	270	0
