= Bradford derby =

Association football rivalry

- Other names: Wool City derby
- Location: Bradford
- Teams: Bradford City; Bradford (Park Avenue)
- First meeting: Bradford (Park Avenue) 0–1 Bradford City; 1911–12 FA Cup (24 February 1912)
- Latest meeting: Bradford (Park Avenue) 0–0 Bradford City; 1968–69 Fourth Division (25 January 1969)

Statistics
- Total meetings: 56
- Most wins: Bradford Park Avenue (23)
- All-time series: Bradford PA: 23; Draw: 11; Bradford City: 22
- Largest victory: Bradford (Park Avenue) 5–0 Bradford City; 1927–28 Third Division (North) (28 January 1928); Bradford City 5–0 Bradford (Park Avenue); 1955–56 Third Division (North) (16 April 1956)

The Bradford derby is a football derby match played between Bradford City and Bradford (Park Avenue).

The derby has also been called the Wool City derby, referring to Bradford's history with the wool trade. The two clubs are the only two from Bradford to have played professional league football.

The rivalry was first played in 1912 in the FA Cup, and there were 56 competitive matches between the teams, ending in 1969.

The fixture is now played as a regular friendly, and the Tom Banks Memorial Trophy is awarded to the winner of this match.

== History ==
Bradford City had been elected to the Football League ready for the 1903–04 season. Their cross-city rivals Bradford (Park Avenue) joined the league five years later, for the same season as City's first in Division One.

The first game between the two teams was on 19 November 1907, a 2–1 win for City.

The first all-Bradford league match took place at Valley Parade on 23 October 1914 in Division One in front of a crowd of 29,802, when City won 3–2. Park Avenue won the reverse fixture 3–0.

The clubs met in the top flight just four more times before Park Avenue were relegated in 1920–21. City were themselves relegated to Division Two but a second successive relegation for Park Avenue meant the clubs did not meet again until 1927 in Division Three (North). That season's derby saw Park Avenue record a record 5–0 for a Bradford derby on their way to the title and promotion. City kept the title in Bradford the following season.

Between the 1929–30 and 1936–37 seasons the clubs continued their rivalries until City were relegated, one place below Park Avenue. The derby was resumed from 1950–51 to 1957–58 in Division Three (North), a period which included an FA Cup tie in December 1951 and a record 5–0 win for City at home on 16 April 1956. A league restructure meant the clubs did not meet again in the league again until the 1963–64 season in Division Four, although the teams did meet again in the FA Cup in December 1958 and the League Cup in September 1963, when Park Avenue were 7–3 winners.

The teams met on six successive seasons until 1968–69 when City were promoted to Division Three in fourth spot and Park Avenue had to seek re-election when they came bottom of the league.

The final derby was on 25 January 1969, a goalless draw. There were a total of 56 derby games - 52 in the league and 4 in the Cup.

The following season Park Avenue failed a fourth successive re-election and were replaced by Cambridge United, before they went into liquidation in 1974 and the teams have never met in competitive football since.

In modern times, the teams have sometimes participated in a pre-season friendly.

== Results ==
=== Statistics ===
Statistics are correct as of 25 January 1969.

| Competition | Played | Avenue | Draw | City | Avenue goals | City goals |
|---|---|---|---|---|---|---|
| Football League First Division | 6 | 1 | 2 | 3 | 7 | 7 |
| Football League Second Division | 16 | 8 | 2 | 6 | 22 | 20 |
| Football League Third Division North | 18 | 7 | 5 | 6 | 24 | 30 |
| Football League Fourth Division | 12 | 5 | 2 | 5 | 19 | 17 |
| FA Cup | 3 | 1 | 0 | 2 | 3 | 4 |
| League Cup | 1 | 1 | 0 | 0 | 7 | 3 |
| Total | 56 | 23 | 11 | 22 | 82 | 81 |

=== League ===
| Season | Division | Bradford (Park Avenue) at Home | | | | Bradford City at Home | | | |
| Season | Division | Date | Score | Venue | Atten. | Date | Score | Venue | Atten. |
|---|---|---|---|---|---|---|---|---|---|
| 1914–15 | First Division | 28 April 1915 | 3–0 | Park Avenue | | 24 October 1914 | 3–2 | Valley Parade | |
| 1919–20 | First Division | 11 February 1920 | 0–0 | Park Avenue | | 3 January 1920 | 0–0 | Valley Parade | |
| 1920–21 | First Division | 25 September 1920 | 1–2 | Park Avenue | | 2 October 1920 | 2–1 | Valley Parade | |
| 1927–28 | Third Division North | 28 January 1928 | 5–0 | Park Avenue | 21,876 | 17 September 1927 | 2–3 | Valley Parade | 37,059 |
| 1929–30 | Second Division | 14 September 1929 | 0–2 | Park Avenue | 28,880 | 18 January 1930 | 1–2 | Valley Parade | 34,172 |
| 1930–31 | Second Division | 18 February 1931 | 1–2 | Park Avenue | 17,012 | 25 October 1930 | 0–4 | Valley Parade | 28,378 |
| 1931–32 | Second Division | 7 November 1931 | 1–0 | Park Avenue | 21,035 | 19 March 1932 | 0–0 | Valley Parade | 27,784 |
| 1932–33 | Second Division | 21 January 1933 | 2–0 | Park Avenue | 22,602 | 10 September 1932 | 1–0 | Valley Parade | 28,110 |
| 1933–34 | Second Division | 9 September 1933 | 2–1 | Park Avenue | 22,120 | 20 January 1934 | 3–0 | Valley Parade | 22,774 |
| 1934–35 | Second Division | 9 March 1935 | 2–1 | Park Avenue | 13,685 | 27 October 1934 | 3–1 | Valley Parade | 14,234 |
| 1935–36 | Second Division | 23 November 1935 | 1–1 | Park Avenue | 22,321 | 28 March 1936 | 2–1 | Valley Parade | 16,066 |
| 1936–37 | Second Division | 23 November 1935 | 2–1 | Park Avenue | 19,005 | 28 March 1936 | 2–3 | Valley Parade | 28,236 |
| 1950–51 | Third Division North | 30 September 1950 | 3–1 | Park Avenue | 25,655 | 17 February 1951 | 4–1 | Valley Parade | 18,454 |
| 1951–52 | Third Division North | 19 January 1952 | 2–1 | Park Avenue | 21,730 | 15 September 1951 | 2–2 | Valley Parade | 23,135 |
| 1952–53 | Third Division North | 20 September 1952 | 2–2 | Park Avenue | 15,702 | 7 February 1953 | 2–1 | Valley Parade | 18,661 |
| 1953–54 | Third Division North | 22 August 1953 | 4–0 | Park Avenue | 19,376 | 19 December 1953 | 3–0 | Valley Parade | 17,526 |
| 1954–55 | Third Division North | 18 December 1954 | 2–0 | Park Avenue | 13,975 | 21 August 1954 | 1–1 | Valley Parade | 17,838 |
| 1955–56 | Third Division North | 15 October 1955 | 1–1 | Park Avenue | 19,396 | 16 April 1956 | 5–0 | Valley Parade | 11,658 |
| 1956–57 | Third Division North | 19 January 1957 | 2–0 | Park Avenue | 22,010 | 15 September 1956 | 2–0 | Valley Parade | 20,523 |
| 1957–58 | Third Division North | 12 October 1957 | 0–0 | Park Avenue | 22,899 | 22 March 1958 | 2–1 | Valley Parade | 16,698 |
| 1963–64 | Fourth Division | 12 October 1963 | 1–3 | Park Avenue | | 22 February 1964 | 1–0 | Valley Parade | |
| 1964–65 | Fourth Division | 15 September 1964 | 3–3 | Park Avenue | | 9 September 1964 | 0–2 | Valley Parade | |
| 1965–66 | Fourth Division | 23 April 1966 | 5–1 | Park Avenue | 10,202 | 16 February 1966 | 3–0 | Valley Parade | 9,004 |
| 1966–67 | Fourth Division | 5 November 1966 | 2–0 | Park Avenue | 9,870 | 3 September 1966 | 2–3 | Valley Parade | 9,856 |
| 1967–68 | Fourth Division | 30 September 1967 | 1–2 | Park Avenue | 9,552 | 10 February 1968 | 1–2 | Valley Parade | 11,513 |
| 1968–69 | Fourth Division | 25 January 1969 | 0–0 | Park Avenue | | 6 November 1968 | 1–0 | Valley Parade | |

=== Cup ===
| Season | Competition | Score | Venue | Atten. |
|---|---|---|---|---|
| 1911–12 | FA Cup Third round | 0–1 | Park Avenue | |
| 1951–52 | FA Cup Second round | 3–1 | Park Avenue | |
| 1958–59 | FA Cup Second round | 0–2 | Park Avenue | |
| 1963–64 | League Cup First round | 7–3 | Park Avenue | |

== Crossing the divide ==
The following is a list of players who have represented both clubs in at least one senior fixture.

| Name | Position | Bradford City | | | Bradford (Park Avenue) | | |
| Name | Position | Career | Apps | Goals | Career | Apps | Goals |
|---|---|---|---|---|---|---|---|
| Simon Ainge | DF | 2006–2009 | 14 | 0 | 2009; 2015–2016 | 2; 46 | 0; 6 |
| Wayne Benn | MF | 1994–1996 | 10 | 0 | 1996–2004 | | |
| Joe Brown | FW | 2005–2007 | 19 | 1 | | | |
| Chris Brandon | MF | 2008–2010 | 27 | 2 | 1995–1997; 1999 | | |
| David Brown | FW | 2008 | 5 | 1 | 2010– | | |
| Wayne Bullimore | MF | 1995–1997 | 2 | 0 | | 4 | 0 |
| Dick Conroy | DF | 1948–1953 | 158 | 0 | 1953–1956 | 57 | 0 |
| Norman Corner | FW | 1969–1972 | 110 | 16 | 1972–1973 | | |
| Joe Colbeck | MF | 2004–2009 | 109 | 8 | | | |
| Terry Dolan | MF | 1976–1981 | 195 | 43 | 1969–1970 | 48 | 0 |
| Mitchell Downie | GK | 1959–1963 | 134 | 0 | 1950–1954 | 154 | 0 |
| Donald Duckett | | 1914–1924 | 155 | 6 | 1927–1929 | | |
| Karl Goddard | DF | 1986–1990 | 73 | 0 | | | |
| Neil Grayston | DF | 1995–1996 | 7 | 0 | 1996–1999; 2004 | | |
| Rodney Green | FW | 1962–1964 | 66 | 39 | 1962 | 19 | 6 |
| Bobby Ham | FW | 1968–1970; 1973–1975 | 115; 73 | 40; 24 | 1961–1963 | | |
| James Hanson | | | | | | | |
| Geoff Hudson | | | | | | | |
| Andy Lee | MF | 2002–2003 | 2 | 0 | | | |
| Gerry Lightowler | DF | 1968–1969 | 11 | 0 | 1958–1968 | 208 | 1 |
| Harry Peel | FW | 1929–1936 | 186 | 26 | 1920–1926 | 207 | 37 |
| Charlie Rackstraw | FW | 1967–1969 | 104 | 27 | 1970–1971 | | |
| Neil Redfearn | MF | 1999–2000 | 17 | 1 | 2006–2007 | 27 | 5 |
| Kevin Sanasy | FW | 2002–2005 | 9 | 1 | | | |
| Carl Shutt | FW | 1994–1995 | 89 | 16 | 2004–2005 | 13 | 1 |
| Whelan Ward | FW | 1948–1954 | 149 | 37 | 1955–1959 | 108 | 31 |
