= Joseph Hargreaves =

Joseph Hargreaves may refer to:

- Joseph Hargreaves (New Zealand politician) (1821–1880), New Zealand politician
- Joe Hargreaves (footballer, fl. 1912–1924), English footballer
- Joe Hargreaves (footballer, born 1915) (1915–1992), English footballer
- Ken Hargreaves (1939–2012), (Joseph Kenneth Hargreaves), British politician
