= Bob Sharp =

Bob Sharp or Sharpe may refer to:

- Bob Sharp (football manager) (1894–?), football manager of Bradford City and deputy lord mayor of Bradford
- Bob Sharpe (footballer) (1925–2014), Scottish footballer
- Bob Sharp (speedway rider) (1934–2012), speedway rider, Australian champion
- Bob Sharp (racing driver) (1939–2025), American racing driver
- Bob Sharpe (basketball) (born 1951), Canadian basketball player

== See also ==
- Robert Sharp (disambiguation)
