= Norman Corner =

English footballer

Personal information
- Full name: James Norman Corner
- Date of birth: 16 February 1943
- Place of birth: Horden, England
- Date of death: 19 February 2011 (aged 68)
- Place of death: Horden, England
- Height: 6 ft 2 in (1.88 m)
- Positions: Centre half; forward

Youth career
- 1960–1961: Horden Colliery Welfare
- 1961–1962: Wolverhampton Wanderers

Senior career*
Years	Team	Apps	(Gls)
1962	Horden Colliery Welfare		
1962–1967	Hull City	5	(4)
1967–1969	Lincoln City	45	(12)
1969–1972	Bradford City	110	(16)
1972–1973	Bradford (Park Avenue)		
1973–1974	South Shields		
- Wingate
- Horden Colliery Welfare
Total		160	(32)

Managerial career
- Wingate
- * Club domestic league appearances and goals

James Norman Corner, known as Norman Corner, (16 February 1943 – 19 February 2011) was an English professional footballer who could play as either a centre half or a forward. Active in the Football League between 1964 and 1971, Corner made 160 appearances, scoring 32 goals.

== Early life ==
Corner was born in the mining village of Horden, in County Durham, England, on 16 February 1943. He attended Horden Roman Catholic School where he played centre half and wing half for the football team, and was selected for East Durham Boys.

== Career ==
Corner played youth football with Horden Colliery Welfare before he signed amateur forms at Wolverhampton Wanderers in 1961. He spent 18 months with Wolves but was restricted to appearances in the Northern Intermediate League teams and returned to Horden Colliery Welfare. In August 1962, he again attracted a league club and he signed for Hull City on professional forms. Corner's debut for Hull came against Brentford in April 1964 when he scored twice in a 3–1 win at Griffin Park. However, he played only five first team games, scoring four goals, in five years, during which time Hull turned down an approach from Brian Clough at Hartlepools United, before Lincoln City signed Corner for a fee just short of £4,000.

He made his Lincoln debut on 7 October 1967 against Newport County to help his new side win 2–1. In April 1968, he scored a hat-trick against Bradford (Park Avenue) with all three goals coming from corners. His final game with Lincoln came on 18 January 1969 in a 2–2 draw with Brentford.

The same month, Bradford City paid a fee also close to £4,000 for Corner. At 6 ft 2 in (1.88 m), he was the tallest player to have played for the club at the time. He made his debut in a Bradford derby against Park Avenue on 25 January 1969, and scored his first goal in the following game which finished in a 5–1 victory against Grimsby Town. He helped City to 21 games undefeated to earn them promotion in his first season at the club during which period he scored eight goals. In his second season, he tallied another five goals and also scored in a League Cup match against Sunderland. In his third season, he moved into defence, but still scored in all four of the club's FA Cup games. However, along with Bruce Bannister he was unable to agree personal terms with the club. He appealed to an independent tribunal which proved to be unsuccessful but left the club on a free transfer to join Park Avenue in March 1972. His last game for City was in December 1971, against Aston Villa.

Corner had passed his coaching exams while with City, and started coaching at Park Avenue.

In July 1973, he moved to South Shields. He played one season with South Shields, before he took over as player-manager at Wingate in the Wearside League. They came runners-up in the league and won a number of cup competitions under his guidance.

He returned to Horden Colliery and scored their first goal in the Northern League following promotion from the Wearside League. He remained at the club on the committee.

He went onto begin his own business and coached in schools.

== Later life and death ==
After returning to the North-East, Corner lived in Horden, where he served on the committee at his former club Colliery Welfare, and later Peterlee. He was married to Jean, with whom he had two children Susan and Steven. Corner died in his native Horden on 19 February 2011, three days after his 68th birthday. His funeral was held at Horden Catholic Church, next to the Colliery Welfare's home ground.
