= Tremelling =

Tremelling is a surname. Notable people with the surname include:

- Billy Tremelling (1905–1961), English footballer
- Dan Tremelling (1897–1978), English footballer
- Janine Tremelling (born 1967), Australian tennis player
- John Tremelling (1929–2016), Australian sport shooter
- Michelle Tremelling (born 1969), Australian archer
- Sol Tremelling (1887–1960), English Footballer
