= Neil Grayston =

Neil Grayston is the name of:

- Neil Grayston (actor), Canadian actor
- Neil Grayston (footballer), English professional footballer
