= Robert Sharpe =

Robert Sharpe may refer to:

- Robert Sharpe (judge) (born 1945), Canadian lawyer, author, academic, and judge
- Robert Sharpe (railway contractor) (1804–1868), contractor on railway projects in England, Wales and Brazil
- Robert K. Sharpe (1930–2016), American TV and film director
- Pepper Sharpe (Robert Ernest Sharpe, 1918–1997), American Negro league pitcher

== See also ==
- Bob Sharpe (disambiguation)
- Robert Sharp (disambiguation)
