= John Hall (footballer, born 1944) =

English footballer

Personal information
- Full name: John Franklin Hall
- Date of birth: 18 April 1944 (age 82)
- Place of birth: Bramley, England
- Position: Right winger

Senior career*
Years	Team	Apps	(Gls)
1960–1961	Huddersfield Town	0	(0)
1961–1974	Bradford City	430	(63)
- Gainsborough Trinity
- Guiseley
- Leeds Ashley Road
- Yeadon Celtic
- * Club domestic league appearances and goals

John Franklin Hall (born 18 April 1944) is an English former professional footballer who is third in the list of Bradford City's players by appearance, after playing 430 games for the club. He was a right winger.

== Career ==
Hall spent one season at Huddersfield Town before moving across West Yorkshire to join Bradford City on amateur forms in May 1961. A year later he became a full-time professional at Valley Parade. Over the next 13 years, he played 430 league games, 21 FA Cup games and 23 League Cup appearances for City as a right winger. Only Ces Podd and Ian Cooper have played more times for Bradford City.

He made his name as a goal-scorer. He was the club's top scorer in 1966–1967 and many of his goals came towards the start or end of either half. He scored 63 league goals and 9 cup goals for City.

In June 1974 he left Bradford City to join non-league side Gainsborough Trinity, before a year later moving on again to Guiseley. In August 1978 he joined Leeds Ashley Road.
