= Rod Johnson (footballer) =

English footballer (1945–2019)

Personal information
- Full name: Rodney Johnson
- Date of birth: 8 January 1945
- Place of birth: Leeds, England
- Date of death: December 2019 (aged 74)
- Position: Midfielder

Youth career
- Leeds United

Senior career*
Years	Team	Apps	(Gls)
1962–1968	Leeds United	22	(4)
1968–1970	Doncaster Rovers	107	(23)
1970–1973	Rotherham United	110	(8)
1973–1979	Bradford City	192	(16)
- Gainsborough Trinity
Total		431	(51)

International career
- England youth
- * Club domestic league appearances and goals

Rodney Johnson (8 January 1945 – December 2019) was an English professional footballer who played as a midfielder.

== Career ==
Born in Leeds, Johnson played for Leeds United, Doncaster Rovers, Rotherham United, Bradford City and Gainsborough Trinity.

He was also an England youth international.

He died in December 2019, aged 74.
