= Tom Hallett =

Welsh footballer and coach

Personal information
- Full name: Thomas Reginald Hallett
- Date of birth: 10 April 1939 (age 87)
- Place of birth: Glynneath, Wales
- Height: 5 ft 11 in (1.80 m)
- Position: Centre half

Youth career
- 1956–1962: Leeds United

Senior career*
Years	Team	Apps	(Gls)
1962–1963	Leeds United	0	(0)
1963–1966	Swindon Town	26	(0)
1966–1971	Bradford City	179	(2)
Total		205	(2)

Managerial career
- 1968: Bradford City (joint caretaker)
- * Club domestic league appearances and goals

Thomas Reginald Hallett (born 10 April 1939) is a Welsh former professional football player and coach.

== Career ==
Born in Glynneath, Hallett was a Welsh schoolboy international, and began his career with Leeds United. He turned professional in 1956 but made only one first-team appearance, in a League Cup game in 1962. He moved to Swindon Town in 1963, making 26 appearances in the English Football League over three seasons. His final team was Bradford City, where he made 179 league appearances, before retiring in 1971. In 1968, he also served as joint caretaker manager of Bradford City, alongside Jim McAnearney, following the death of Grenville Hair.
