= Bobby Bauld =

Scottish footballer (1902–1980)

Personal information
- Full name: Robert Bauld
- Date of birth: 14 March 1902
- Place of birth: Cowdenbeath, Scotland
- Date of death: 19 October 1980 (aged 78)
- Place of death: Glasgow, Scotland
- Positions: Left half; inside forward

Senior career*
Years	Team	Apps	(Gls)
- Glencraig Celtic
1920	St Bernard's (trial)	1	(0)
1921–1923	Raith Rovers	69	(17)
1923–1927	Dundee United	134	(28)
1927–1935	Bradford City	217	(34)
1935–1936	Chesterfield	2	(0)
Total		423	(79)
- * Club domestic league appearances and goals

Robert Bauld (14 March 1902 – 19 October 1980) was a Scottish professional footballer who played as a left half and inside forward. He played in the Scottish Football League for Raith Rovers and Dundee United, and in the English Football League for Bradford City and Chesterfield.

== Career ==
Born in Cowdenbeath, Bauld was the son of the colliery under-manager at nearby Glencraig. He played junior football for Glencraig Celtic and began to attract the attention of a number of senior clubs. In October 1920 he appeared as a trialist for St Bernard's in a Central League match against Dundee Hibernian and was reported to have "played well" at right back. Later that month, Bauld was also due to play as a trialist for Cowdenbeath in the Central League, but missed the chance due to suspension after he was sent off playing for Glencraig.

On 4 December 1920, Bauld "gave a satisfactory display" turning out for a Scottish Select in a junior international trial match against Dumbartonshire at Clydeholm, Clydebank. He was then selected to appear in a further trial match, for the Rest of Scotland against Glasgow at Firhill Park, Glasgow on 4 January 1921. His performance at Clydebank also led to further interest from senior clubs, with approaches from Raith Rovers and Celtic before Bauld agreed to appear for Rangers "A" in a Scottish Alliance fixture against Ayr United "A". He also had a trial with Tottenham Hotspur before signing for Raith Rovers in January 1921. Bauld made his Scottish League debut for Raith in a 1–0 victory over Aberdeen at Stark's Park on 8 January 1921, when he "gave a sterling exhibition in his first senior game".

Bauld moved from Raith to Dundee United on 31 October 1923 for a fee of £100. He scored 30 goals in 143 games across all competitions for them. He moved to Bradford City in July 1927, for a transfer fee of £350. He scored 34 goals in 217 appearances for them in the English Football League, as well as scoring 1 goal in 10 FA Cup appearances. He moved to Chesterfield in May 1935, making a further 2 league appearances before retiring.

== Sources ==
- Frost, Terry (1988). Bradford City A Complete Record 1903-1988. Breedon Books Sport. ISBN 0-907969-38-0.
