= Sol Tremelling =

English footballer

Personal information
- Full name: Elijah Solomon Tremelling
- Date of birth: 8 May 1887
- Place of birth: Newhall, England
- Date of death: December 1960 (aged 73)
- Position: Centre half

Senior career*
Years	Team	Apps	(Gls)
- Newhall Swifts
- Derby County
- Burton United
- Ilkeston United
- Gresley Rovers
- Shirebrook Forest
1913–1919	Bradford City	2	(0)
1916–1917	→ Chesterfield Town (war guest)		
1917	→ Notts County (war guest)		
1919	→ Lincoln City (war guest)	4	(0)
- Mansfield Town
Total		6	(0)
- * Club domestic league appearances and goals

Elijah Solomon Tremelling (8 May 1887 – December 1960) was an English professional footballer who played as a centre half.

== Early and personal life ==
Tremelling was born in Newhall, Derbyshire, on 8 May 1887. His brothers Dan and Billy were also footballers, as was a fourth brother, Jack. His son Arthur was also a footballer.

== Career ==
Tremelling spent his early career with Newhall Swifts, Derby County, Burton United, Ilkeston United, Gresley Rovers and Shirebrook Forest. He joined Bradford City in March 1913, making 2 league appearances for the club. He signed for Bradford City along with fellow Gresley players Charlie Storer and George Draycott for a combined fee of £150. He guested for Chesterfield Town, Notts County and Lincoln City during World War One, both from parent club Bradford City. After leaving Bradford City he played for Mansfield Town in August 1919.

He died in December 1960.

== Sources ==
- Frost, Terry (1988). Bradford City A Complete Record 1903-1988. Breedon Books Sport. ISBN 0-907969-38-0.
