= Jim McAnearney =

Scottish footballer and manager

Personal information
- Full name: James McAnearney
- Date of birth: 20 March 1935
- Place of birth: Dundee, Scotland
- Date of death: 14 March 2017 (aged 81)
- Height: 5 ft 8 in (1.73 m)
- Position: Inside forward

Youth career
- St Stephen's
- 1951–1954: Sheffield Wednesday

Senior career*
Years	Team	Apps	(Gls)
1954–1959	Sheffield Wednesday	38	(10)
1959–1963	Plymouth Argyle	135	(34)
1963–1966	Watford	86	(19)
1966–1968	Bradford City	45	(5)
Total		304	(68)

Managerial career
- 1968: Bradford City
- 1968–1973: Rotherham United
- 1975: Sheffield Wednesday (caretaker)
- Frickley Athletic
- 1981–1982: Scarborough
- Hallam
- * Club domestic league appearances and goals

James McAnearney (20 March 1935 – 14 March 2017) was a Scottish football player and manager.

McAnearney played for Sheffield Wednesday, Plymouth Argyle, Watford and Bradford City, who he also briefly managed in 1968 with Tom Hallett. He later managed Rotherham United, Frickley Athletic, Scarborough and Hallam, and worked as a coach at Sheffield Wednesday (where he was also caretaker manager) and Leeds United. In later life he established and ran a tool/engineering business.

== Early and personal life ==
McMcAnearney was born in Dundee. His older brother Tom was also a professional footballer.

== Club career ==
After playing for St Stephen's, McAnearney signed for Sheffield Wednesday in October 1951, at the same time as older brother Tom, and turned professional on his seventeenth birthday. He made his professional debut on 24 February 1954, scoring 10 goals in 40 games in all competitions, and spending a total of eight years with the club.

He signed for Plymouth Argyle in January 1960, scoring 37 goals in 147 games in all competitions, before leaving for Watford in November 1963. He moved to Bradford City in September 1966. He scored 5 goals in 50 games in all competitions for Bradford City.

He scored 68 goals in 304 league appearances.

== Coaching career ==
He gained his full FA Coaching Badge in 1958, at the age of 23, one of the youngest players to do so. While playing for Bradford City spent a brief spell managing the club alongside Tom Hallett in early 1968, following the sudden death of manager Grenville Hair in March and before Jimmy Wheeler was appointed as the new permanent manager in June. He left Bradford to join Rotherham United in May 1968, initially as chief coach to Tommy Docherty, but then as manager between November 1968 and 1973. He later worked as a coach at Sheffield Wednesday (where he was also caretaker manager after the departure of Steve Burtenshaw) and Leeds United, and also managed Frickley Athletic, Scarborough and Hallam.

== Later life ==
After his coaching career finished in the 1970s, McAnearney founded a tool engineering/machine company in Sheffield. He died on 14 March 2017, at the age of 81.

== Sources ==
- Frost, Terry (1988). Bradford City A Complete Record 1903-1988. Breedon Books Sport. ISBN 0-907969-38-0.
