= David Gray (footballer, born 1923) =

Scottish footballer

Personal information
- Full name: David Downie Gray
- Date of birth: 13 April 1923
- Place of birth: Clydebank, Scotland
- Date of death: 1985 (aged 61–62)
- Place of death: Bradford, England
- Position: Right half

Senior career*
Years	Team	Apps	(Gls)
- Queensbury United
1948–1957	Bradford City	242	(13)
- Ossett Town
- Halifax Town
- * Club domestic league appearances and goals

David Downie Gray (13 April 1923 – 1985) was a Scottish professional footballer who played as a right half.

== Career ==
Born in Clydebank, Gray moved from Queensbury United to Bradford City in September 1948. He scored 13 goals in 242 Football League appearances for Bradford City, as well as making a further 15 FA Cup appearances. He left Bradford City in October 1957 to sign for Ossett Town, and also played for Halifax Town.

== Sources ==
- Frost, Terry (1988). Bradford City A Complete Record 1903-1988. Breedon Books Sport. ISBN 0-907969-38-0.
