= Howard Cooper =

English cricketer (born 1949)

Personal information
- Full name: Howard Pennett Cooper
- Born: 17 April 1949 (age 77); Great Horton, Bradford, Yorkshire, England
- Batting: Left-handed
- Bowling: Right-arm medium

Domestic team information
- Years: Team
- 1971–1980: Yorkshire
- 1973/74: Northern Transvaal

Career statistics
Competition	First-class	List A
Matches	101	142
Runs scored	1,191	483
Batting average	14.34	12.07
100s/50s	0/1	0/0
Top score	56	29*
Balls bowled	15,331	6,591
Wickets	233	177
Bowling average	28.02	23.63
5 wickets in innings	4	2
10 wickets in match	1	–
Best bowling	8/62	6/14
Catches/stumpings	61/–	26/–
- Source: Cricinfo, 25 April 2026

Howard Pennett Cooper (born 17 April 1949) is an English former first-class cricketer, who played for Yorkshire from 1971 to 1980, and for Northern Transvaal in the 1973–74 season.

Cooper was born in Great Horton, Bradford, Yorkshire. He played club cricket for Bankfoot C.C. He developed his talent for swing and seam at brisk pace through Bankfoot's junior teams, before helping them win the Bradford League championship in 1972. After his Yorkshire career ended, he re-joined Bankfoot as captain in 1984, where they gained promotion and he led the side and the bowling attack for a further two years in Division One.

Cooper was a right-arm medium-pace bowler, and tail-end left-handed batsman. He suffered from regular back trouble, and had to modify his bowling action accordingly and concentrate on accuracy.

In 101 first-class matches, Cooper took 233 wickets at an average of 28.02, with best innings figures of 8 for 62 against Glamorgan in 1975, and best match figures of 11 for 96 against Northamptonshire in 1976. He scored 1,191 runs, with a best score of 56, at an average of 14.34. He took 177 wickets at 23.63 in 142 one-day games, with a career best of 6 for 14 against Worcestershire in 1975.

Cooper served as the president of Yorkshire CCC Players' Association from 2017 to 2019.

== Personal life ==
Cooper's brother Ian was a footballer for Bradford City.
