= Jimmy Gooch (footballer) =

English footballer

Personal information
- Date of birth: 11 July 1921
- Place of birth: West Ham, England
- Date of death: 2001 (aged 79–80)
- Position: Goalkeeper

Senior career*
Years	Team	Apps	(Gls)
- Becontree
1942–1952	Preston North End	135	(0)
1953–1955	Bradford City	22	(0)
1955–1957	Watford	43	(0)
- Bath City
Total		200	(0)
- * Club domestic league appearances and goals

Jimmy Gooch (11 July 1921 – 2001) was an English professional footballer who played as a goalkeeper.

== Career ==
Born in West Ham, Gooch began his career at Becontree. He joined Preston North End as an amateur in March 1942, turning professional in May of that year. He later played for Bradford City, Watford and Bath City.
