= Dick Conroy =

English footballer

Personal information
- Date of birth: 29 July 1927
- Place of birth: Bradford, England
- Date of death: 1991 (aged 63–64)
- Position: Centre half

Youth career
- –1948: Swain House

Senior career*
Years	Team	Apps	(Gls)
1948–1953	Bradford City	158	(0)
1953–1956	Bradford Park Avenue	57	(0)
1956–????	Grantham Town		
- * Club domestic league appearances and goals

Dick Conroy (29 July 1927 – 1991) was an English professional footballer who played in the Football League for both of his hometown clubs – Bradford City and Bradford Park Avenue. He also played for Swain House and Grantham Town.
