= Charlie Storer =

English footballer (1891–?)

Personal information
- Date of birth: 29 March 1891
- Place of birth: Ibstock, England
- Height: 5 ft 8 1/2 in (1.74 m)
- Position: Inside forward

Senior career*
Years	Team	Apps	(Gls)
1913–1924	Bradford City	208	(13)
1924–1925	Hartlepool United	31	(0)
Total		239	(13)
- * Club domestic league appearances and goals

Charles Storer (29 March 1891 – ?) was an English professional footballer who played as an inside forward for Bradford City and Hartlepool United. He was born in Ibstock.

He signed for Bradford City along with fellow Gresley players Sol Tremelling and George Draycott for a combined fee of £150.
