= Football in Yorkshire =

Association football in a Northern England county

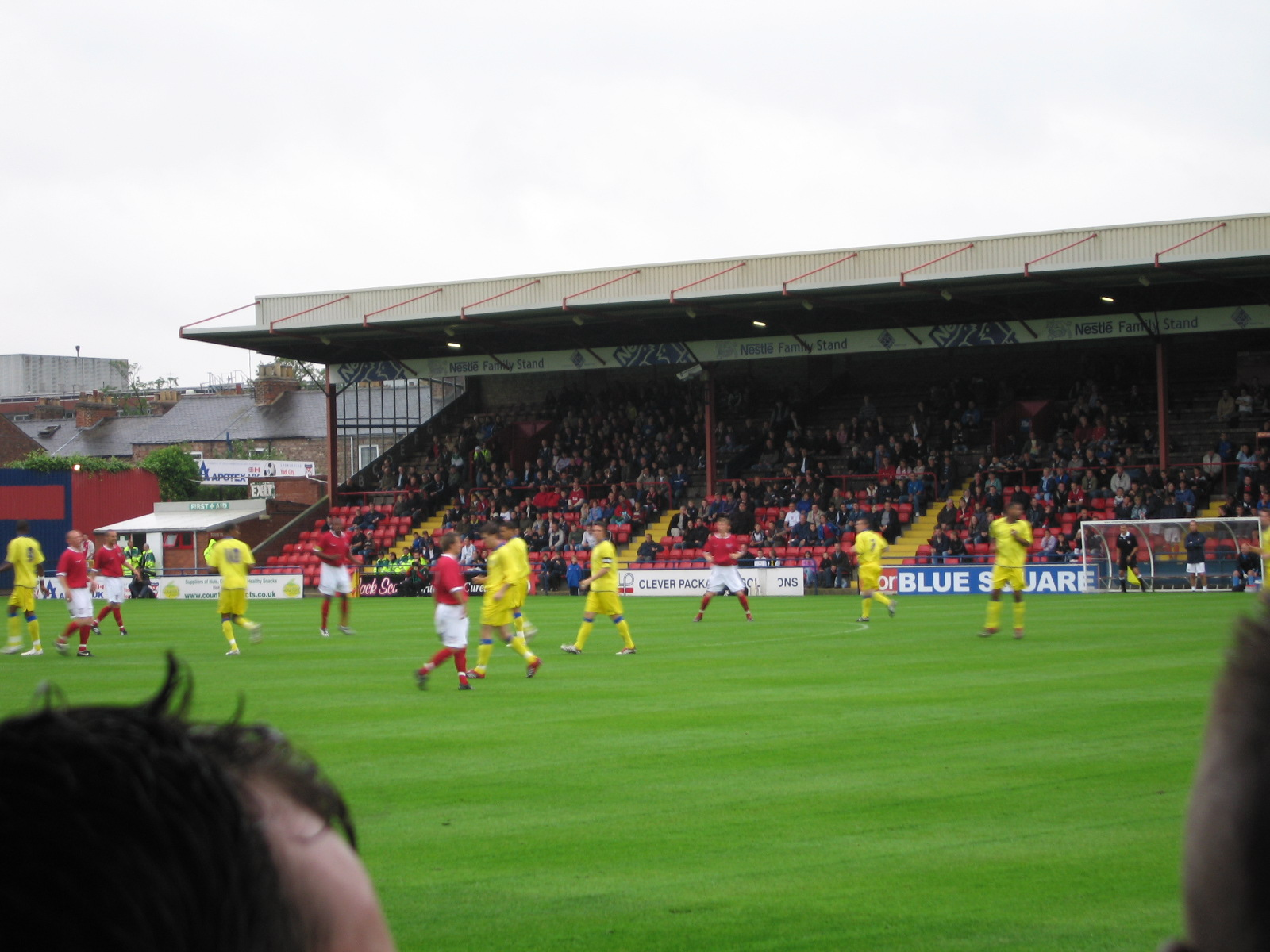
Two Yorkshire clubs, Leeds United and York City, playing each other in a friendly match.

Football in Yorkshire refers to the sport of association football in relation to its participation and history within Yorkshire, England. The county is the largest in the United Kingdom and as thus has many football clubs professional and amateur.

Sheffield in South Yorkshire is recognised by FIFA and UEFA as the birthplace of club football, because Sheffield F.C. are the oldest association football club in the world, though Sheffield actually play in Derbyshire. Hallam F.C. also from Sheffield are the second oldest. With its origins in the Sheffield Rules code, the game eventually spread to other parts of the county after Hull local Ebenezer Cobb Morley wrote The Football Association's Laws of the Game, which are still used worldwide today.

== History ==
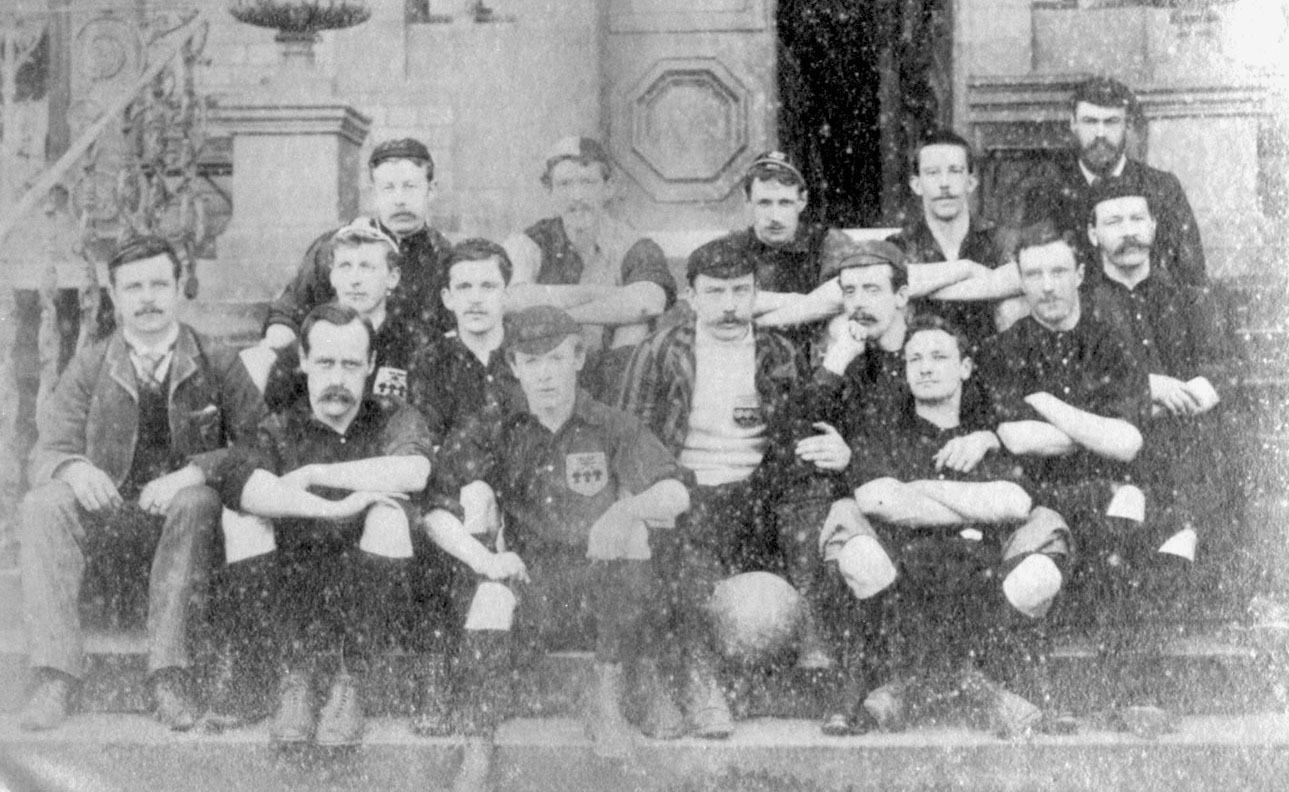
Sheffield F.C., pictured in 1890, are the oldest football club in the world

The county has a very long tradition in the sport; it is officially recognised by FIFA as being the birthplace of club football as the world's oldest club Sheffield F.C. was formed in Sheffield during 1857. Two men from Sheffield codified a set of rules for the game in 1857, these were known as the Sheffield rules and the Football Association rules which were created in 1863 were based in part on them. Ebenezer Cobb Morley was the first secretary of The Football Association, its second ever president and the man who drafted the FA's laws of the game at his home in Hull.

The world's first ever inter-club match took place on 26 December 1860 in Sheffield; the match was between Sheffield F.C. and a newly formed club named Hallam F.C.; Sheffield won 2–0. As Hallam were also from the city of Sheffield, this would also prove to be the world's first ever local derby in club football. Notably, Hallam's home ground Sandygate Road, at which they still play at today, was first opened in 1804 and is recognised by the Guinness Book of Records as the oldest ground in the world.

=== Domestic competitions ===
==== 1860s to 1920s ====
- Herbert Chapman — played for many teams, but was most noted as a manager for Huddersfield Town and Arsenal winning the top honours in English football. He is credited with being one of the game's first modernisers, introducing new tactics and training regime; Chapman is also credited with the introduction of shirt numbers in the sport.
- Thomas Hogg and Chris Hogg — brothers from Skelton, Yorkshire introduced football to Argentina, they organised a meeting on 9 May 1867 where the oldest football club in Argentina was founded in the form of Buenos Aires Football Club.
- Joseph Whitaker — one of the key figures in the foundation of US Palermo, the second oldest football club in Sicily. His family were wealthy 19th-century tycoons from West Yorkshire, who moved to develop a wine industry in Sicily.
- Frank Womack — played for Birmingham City, he holds the all-time league appearances record for the club, turning out a total of 491 times.

==== 1930s to 1970s ====
- Gordon Banks — from Sheffield, played club football largely at Leicester City and Stoke City. With England, he was part of the 1966 FIFA World Cup winning squad, he represented the country 73 times. Banks was elected in a poll by the IFFHS as the second best goalkeeper of the 20th century. He is also acknowledged by FIFA to have made one of the finest saves in the history of the World Cup, at the 1970 tournament, against Pelé of Brazil. He has been awarded an OBE for his contributions to sport.
- George Raynor — from Barnsley, transformed the Sweden national team into a powerful force in the late 1940s, and 1950s. He guided them to an Olympic gold in 1948 and a bronze medal in 1952. In the 1950 World Cup he guided them to 3rd place behind only Brazil and Uruguay, and in 1958 he led them to the final, losing again to Brazil. His remarkable achievements went largely unnoticed and unrecognised in his native England, although in continental Europe he enjoyed short spells as manager of clubs such as Lazio and Juventus.
- Bill Nicholson — from Scarborough, he guided Tottenham Hotspur to the double, the first club to do so in the 20th century. Under his management they also became the first English club to win a European trophy, the European Cup Winners Cup in 1963.
- Don Revie — from Middlesbrough, he had an influential career as both a player and manager. As a player, he became famous as one of the first deep-lying centre forwards of the English game in Manchester City's so-called Revie Plan. In management he transformed Leeds United from Second Division also-rans into one of the most feared club sides in Europe, in the late 1960s and early 1970s. His remarkable achievements with the club were recognised with three Manager of the Year awards, an OBE and the England manager's job, which he eventually left controversially to take up a role in the Middle East.
- Brian Clough — from Middlesbrough, he transformed Derby County from a struggling Second Division club, into first division title winners in 1971–72 Football League First Division, also reaching the European Cup semi-final under his guidance. He was successful again with another struggling Second Division club, Nottingham Forest, winning the first division title in 1978 and the European Cup successively in 1979, and 1980

== Football clubs ==
=== Men's ===
The table below lists English football league system clubs in the top eight tiers located within Yorkshire's traditional borders: from the top division (the Premier League), down to the Northern Premier League.

Club	Stadium	Capacity	Founded	Ceremonial County	Notes
Premier League (1)
Leeds United	Elland Road	37,697	1919	West Yorkshire	League Champions 1968–69, 1973–74, 1991–92; FA Cup Winners 1971–72; League Cup Winners 1967–68; FA Charity Shield Winners 1969, 1992; European Cup Runners-up: 1974–75; European Cup Winners' Cup Runners-up: 1972–73; Inter-Cities Fairs Cup Winners: 1967–68, 1970–71, Runners-up: 1966–67
Hull City	MKM Stadium	25,586	1904	East Riding of Yorkshire	FA Cup Runners-up 2013–14; Football League Championship Runners-up 2012–13; Football League One Champions 2020–21; Football League Third Division Winners 1965–66; Football League Third Division (North) Winners 1932–33, 1948–49
EFL Championship (2)
Middlesbrough	Riverside Stadium	34,988	1876	North Yorkshire	League Cup Winners 2003–04; UEFA Cup Runners-up 2005–06; FA Amateur Cup Winners 1894–95, 1897–98
Sheffield United	Bramall Lane	32,702	1889	South Yorkshire	League Champions 1897–98; FA Cup Winners 1888–89, 1901–02, 1914–15, 1924–25
EFL League One (3)
Barnsley	Oakwell	23,009	1887	South Yorkshire	FA Cup Winners 1911–12
Bradford City	Valley Parade	25,136	1903	West Yorkshire	FA Cup Winners 1910–11
Doncaster Rovers	Keepmoat Stadium	15,231	1879	South Yorkshire	Football League One Champions 2012–13; Football League Third Division (as fourth tier) Champions 2003–04; Football League Fourth Division Champions 1965–66, 1968–69; Football League Trophy Winners 2006–07; Conference League Cup Winners 1998–99, 1999–2000
Huddersfield Town	John Smith's Stadium	24,500	1908	West Yorkshire	League Champions 1923–24,1924–25, 1925–26; FA Cup Winners 1921–22; FA Charity Shield Winners 1922
Sheffield Wednesday	Hillsborough Stadium	39,812	1867	South Yorkshire	League Champions 1902–03, 1903–04, 1928–29, 1929–30; FA Cup Winners 1895–96, 1906–07, 1934–35; League Cup Winners 1990–91; FA Charity Shield Winners 1935
EFL League Two (4)
Rotherham United	New York Stadium	12,021	1925	South Yorkshire	Football League Third Division (North) Champions 1950–51; Football League Third Division Champions 1980–81; Football League Trophy Winners 1995–96; Football League Third Division North Cup 1945–46
York City	York Community Stadium	8,500	1922	North Yorkshire	FA Trophy Winners 2011–12, 2016–17; Football League Fourth Division Champions 1983–84
National League (5)
FC Halifax Town	The Shay	14,061	2008	West Yorkshire	Club reformed following the demise of Halifax Town A.F.C. (HTAFC – Conference National Champions 1997–1998); FA Trophy Winners 2015–16
Harrogate Town	Wetherby Road	5,000	1914	North Yorkshire	
National League North (6)
Farsley Celtic	Throstle Nest	3,900	1908	West Yorkshire	
Scarborough Athletic	Scarborough Sports Village	3,251	2007	North Yorkshire	Phoenix club formed after the closure of Scarborough. ( S.F.C. – National League Champions 1986–87), (FA Trophy Winners 1972–73, 1975–76 & 1976–77)
NPL Premier Division (7)
Whitby Town	Turnbull Ground	3,500	1880	North Yorkshire	FA Vase Winners 1996–97
Liversedge	Cayborn	2,000	1910	West Yorkshire	
Marske United	Mount Pleasant		1956	North Yorkshire	
Guiseley	Nethermoor Park	3,000	1909	West Yorkshire	FA Vase Winners 1990–91
NPL Division One East (8)
Bradford (Park Avenue)	Horsfall Stadium	3,500	1907	West Yorkshire	Football League Third Division (North) Champions 1927–28
Bridlington Town	Queensgate	3,000	1918	East Riding of Yorkshire	
Brighouse Town	St Giles Road	1,000	1963	West Yorkshire	
Emley	Fantastic Welfare Ground			West Yorkshire	
Ossett United	Ingfield	2,000	2018	West Yorkshire	Ossett Town (formed 1936) and Ossett Albion (formed 1944) merged in 2018
Pickering Town	Mill Lane	2,000	1888	North Yorkshire	
Pontefract Collieries	The Football Family Stadium	1,200	1958	West Yorkshire	
Stocksbridge Park Steels	Look Local Stadium, Bracken Moor	3,500	1986	South Yorkshire	
Tadcaster Albion	i2i Stadium	2,000	1892	North Yorkshire	
Yorkshire Amateur	Bracken Edge	1,550	1918	West Yorkshire	

Locations of all East Riding of Yorkshire football clubs from levels 1–8.
Locations of all North Yorkshire football clubs from levels 1–8.
Locations of all South Yorkshire football clubs from levels 1–8.
Locations of all West Yorkshire football clubs from levels 1–8.

=== Women's ===
- FA Women's Championship
  - Sheffield United W.F.C.
- FA Women's National League North
  - Huddersfield Town Women F.C.
  - Hull City Ladies F.C.
  - Middlesbrough W.F.C.
  - Sheffield F.C. Ladies

== Attendances ==
The top 10 football clubs from Yorkshire with the highest average home league attendance in the 2025-26 season:

#	Club	Average
1	Leeds United FC	36,708
2	Sheffield United FC	27,676
3	Middlesbrough FC	27,230
4	Sheffield Wednesday FC	23,830
5	Hull City AFC	21,400
6	Bradford City AFC	20,444
7	Huddersfield Town AFC	17,087
8	Barnsley FC	11,144
9	Doncaster Rovers FC	9,073
10	Rotherham United FC	8,519
Average per club		20,311

== See also ==
- Football in England
- Yorkshire football team
