= Tom McAnearney =

Scottish footballer and manager (1933–2012)

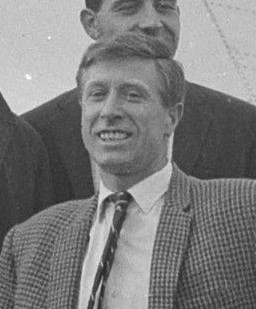
- McAnearney in 1963

Personal information
- Date of birth: 6 January 1933
- Place of birth: Dundee, Scotland
- Date of death: 14 February 2012 (aged 79)
- Height: 5 ft 9 3/4 in (1.77 m)
- Position: Wing half

Senior career*
Years	Team	Apps	(Gls)
1952–1965	Sheffield Wednesday	352	(19)
1965	Peterborough United	12	(0)
1965–1969	Aldershot	106	(3)

Managerial career
- 1967–1968: Aldershot
- 1970–1971: Crewe Alexandra
- 1971–1972: Bury
- 1972–1981: Aldershot
- * Club domestic league appearances and goals

Tom McAnearney (6 January 1933 – 14 February 2012) was a Scottish football player and manager.

Born in Dundee, he played at Sheffield Wednesday, with his brother Jim, and later at Peterborough United and Aldershot. After he retired he joined the Sheffield Wednesday coaching staff. He spent one season as manager of Crewe Alexandra.

In the early 1970s he took over as manager at Aldershot and managed them to their first ever promotion during the 1972-73 season and their highest ever league finish the following season.

McAnearney died on 14 February 2012, aged 79, from undisclosed causes.
