= Robert Sharp =

Robert Sharp may refer to:

- Robert P. Sharp (1911–2004), expert on the geological surfaces of the Earth and the planet Mars
- Robert Sharp (crater), a crater on the planet Mars
- Robert Sharp (cricketer) (1893–1961), English cricketer
- Robert Cameron Sharp (born 1958), Scottish sprinter
- Robert D. Sharp, director of the National Geospatial Intelligence Agency
- Robert Sharp (born 1988), pro wrestler better known as Bobby Sharp

== See also ==
- Robert Sharpe (disambiguation)
- Bob Sharp (disambiguation)
