= Donald Duckett =

English footballer (1894–1970)

Personal information
- Date of birth: 1894
- Place of birth: Thornton, England
- Date of death: 1970 (aged 75–76)
- Height: 5 ft 9 1/2 in (1.77 m)

Senior career*
Years	Team	Apps	(Gls)
1914–1924	Bradford City	155	(6)
1924–1927	Halifax Town	119	(?)
1927–1929	Bradford Park Avenue	36	(0)
- * Club domestic league appearances and goals

Donald Duckett (1894–1970) was an English footballer who played for Bradford City, Halifax Town and Bradford Park Avenue. He was the nephew of Horace Duckett, who played international rugby for England.
