= Billy Watson (Scottish footballer) =

Scottish footballer

Personal information
- Place of birth: Larkhall, Scotland
- Date of death: 1950
- Height: 5 ft 8 1/2 in (1.74 m)
- Position: Left back

Senior career*
Years	Team	Apps	(Gls)
1915–1921	Airdrieonians	218	(0)
1921–1931	Bradford City	330	(1)
1931–1932	Walsall		
- * Club domestic league appearances and goals

William Watson was a Scottish footballer who played as a left back for Bradford City between 1920 and 1931, making 330 league appearances.
