= Neil Grayston (footballer) =

English footballer

Personal information
- Date of birth: 25 November 1975 (age 50)
- Place of birth: England
- Position: Full back

Youth career
- –1995: Bradford City

Senior career*
Years	Team	Apps	(Gls)
1995–1996	Bradford City	7	(0)
1996–1999	Bradford Park Avenue		
1999–2002	Southport		
2002–2003	Halifax Town		
2003–2004	Alfreton Town		
2004	Bradford Park Avenue		
2004	Droylsden		
2004	Guiseley		
- * Club domestic league appearances and goals

Neil Grayston (born 25 November 1975) is an English professional footballer who plays as a full back.

== Career ==
Born in Keighley, Grayston made seven appearances in the Football League for Bradford City during the 1995–96 season. He later played non-league football for a number of clubs, including Bradford Park Avenue, Southport, Halifax Town, Alfreton Town, Droylsden, and Guiseley.
