= Jock Whyte =

Scottish footballer

Personal information
- Full name: John Nimmo Whyte
- Date of birth: 7 May 1921
- Place of birth: Mid Calder, Scotland
- Date of death: 17 October 1998 (aged 77)
- Place of death: Bradford, England
- Position: Full back

Youth career
- –1946: Bedlay

Senior career*
| Years | Team | Apps | (Gls) |
| 1946–1950 | Falkirk | 97 | (0) |
| 1950–1957 | Bradford City | 236 | (2) |
| 1957–1958 | Wigan Athletic | 26 | (0) |
- * Club domestic league appearances and goals

John Nimmo Whyte (7 May 1921 – 17 October 1998) was a Scottish professional footballer who played for Bedlay, Falkirk, Bradford City, and Wigan Athletic.

Whyte spent one season at Wigan, making 26 appearances during the 1957–58 season of the Lancashire Combination.
