= Joe Hargreaves (footballer, fl. 1912–1924) =

English footballer

Personal information
- Height: 5 ft 9 in (1.75 m)

Senior career*
Years	Team	Apps	(Gls)
- Clayton YMCA
- Great Harwood
- Accrington Stanley
1912–1924	Bradford City	188	(6)
- * Club domestic league appearances and goals

Joe Hargreaves was an English professional footballer who played for Bradford City between 1912 and 1924, making 188 league appearances. He also played for Clayton YMCA, Great Harwood and Accrington Stanley.
