= Bob Sharpe (footballer) =

Scottish footballer

Personal information
- Full name: Robert Sharpe
- Date of birth: 20 December 1925
- Place of birth: Kirkcaldy, Scotland
- Date of death: 21 February 2014 (aged 88)
- Position: Right back

Senior career*
Years	Team	Apps	(Gls)
–	Dunfermline Athletic	0	(0)
1947–194?	Thornton Hibs		
194?–1951	Rosyth Recreation		
1951–1952	Raith Rovers	1	(0)
1952–1953	Darlington	14	(0)
–	Blackhall Colliery Welfare		
- * Club domestic league appearances and goals

Robert Sharpe (20 December 1925 – 21 February 2014) was a Scottish footballer who played as a right back in the Scottish League for Raith Rovers and in the English Football League for Darlington.

== Life and career ==
Sharpe was born in Kirkcaldy. He played for Dunfermline Athletic in the 1945–46 wartime league before being reinstated as a junior with Thornton Hibs in 1947. By 1949 he was at Rosyth Recreation, helping the club to the top of the Fife Junior League. In February 1951, after Rosyth had beaten them in the Scottish Junior Cup, the Luncarty club protested Sharpe's inclusion, claiming that his reinstatement as a junior was faulty because he had never previously played as such, having moved directly from juvenile football to a senior club. The Scottish Junior Football Association concurred.

Sharpe moved on to Raith Rovers of Scottish League Division One, for whom he appeared for the reserves but only once in a League match. He became one of several Scots recruited in the 1952 close season by Bob Gurney for English Third Division North club Darlington. He played 14 League matches in the 1952–53 season, and then moved into non-league football with Blackhall Colliery Welfare.

He settled in Darlington, County Durham, where he worked at a garage and as a taxi driver and continued to attend Darlington F.C.'s matches. He was married to Jean and had a son. He died in February 2014.
