= Paul Tomlinson =

English footballer

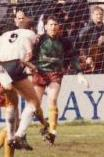

Personal information
- Full name: Paul Tomlinson
- Date of birth: 4 February 1965 (age 61)
- Place of birth: Rotherham, England
- Height: 6 ft 2 in (1.88 m)
- Position: Goalkeeper

Senior career*
Years	Team	Apps	(Gls)
1983–1987	Sheffield United	37	(0)
1986–1987	→ Birmingham City (loan)	11	(0)
1987–1995	Bradford City	293	(0)
Total		341	(0)
- * Club domestic league appearances and goals

Paul Tomlinson (born 4 February 1965) is an English former footballer who played as a goalkeeper for Sheffield United, Birmingham City (on loan) and Bradford City.

Bradford City signed Tomlinson for a club record £47,500 from Sheffield United in June 1987, replacing Peter Litchfield in goal for the 1987–88 season. He holds the record for number of games played by a Bradford City goalkeeper with 293 appearances.

Tomlinson later worked as a golf coach in Spain and in hospitality in the UK. As of May 2024 he was a bar manager in Riddlesden.
