= Tommy Flockett =

English footballer

Personal information
- Full name: Thomas William Flockett
- Date of birth: 17 July 1927
- Place of birth: Ferryhill, England
- Date of death: 12 July 1997 (aged 69)
- Place of death: Chesterfield, England
- Position: Full back

Senior career*
Years	Team	Apps	(Gls)
–	Spennymoor United		
1949–1957	Chesterfield	200	(1)
1957–1963	Bradford City	227	(1)
- * Club domestic league appearances and goals

Thomas William Flockett (17 July 1927 – 12 July 1997) was an English footballer who played for Spennymoor United, Chesterfield and Bradford City.

He served as Bradford City's captain from the 1955–56 season, until at least the 1960–61 season.

== Sources ==
- Frost, Terry (1988). Bradford City A Complete Record 1903-1988. Breedon Books Sport. ISBN 0-907969-38-0.
