= Ian Cooper (English footballer) =

English footballer

Personal information
- Date of birth: 21 September 1946 (age 80)
- Place of birth: Bradford, England
- Position: Left back

Youth career
- 1962–1965: Bradford City

Senior career*
Years	Team	Apps	(Gls)
1965–1977	Bradford City	443	(4)
1977–1980	Guiseley		
- Gainsborough Trinity
- * Club domestic league appearances and goals

Ian Cooper (born 21 September 1946) is an English retired footballer who played as a left back.

== Career ==
Born in Bradford, Cooper played professionally for Bradford City between 1965 and 1977, making nearly 450 league appearances for the club. At Easter 1972, Cooper played in matches on Saturday, Monday, and Tuesday - on the Sunday, he was best man at ahis brother's wedding. Cooper was the club's record appearance holder until Ces Podd surpassed him.

He went on to spend three seasons with Guiseley, and also played for Gainsborough Trinity.

Cooper later worked for Bradford City, in match day hospitality, and worked as a joiner.

== Personal life ==
His brother Howard was a cricketer for Yorkshire.
