= Bob Sharp (football manager) =

English football manager (1894–?)

Personal information
- Full name: Robert Sharp
- Date of birth: October 1894
- Place of birth: Bradford, England
- Date of death: Unknown

Managerial career
- Years: Team
- 1943–1946: Bradford City

Robert Sharp (born October 1894, date of death unknown) was a football manager of Bradford City who also served as Deputy Lord Mayor of Bradford. He was a football visionary who called for the introduction of Third and Fourth Divisions 12 years before they were formed.

== Biography ==
Sharp was born in October 1894 in Bradford, England. He left school intent on making his way in business, and worked in his father's oil cloth shop. This was called Harry Sharp and Sons at this time, but after Robert took control it was eventually renamed Sharps (Floor Furnishers) Ltd. It had been started as a market stall but expanded into multiple shops in several local towns before downsizing into the single one at Legrams Lane, Bradford. Later still it was handed over to his sons Peter and David.

He was councillor for Bradford Moor from 1931 to 1934 and again from 1937 to 1945. He served as Deputy Lord Mayor in 1946. He represented the Eccleshill ward from 1950 to 1952.

== Football career ==
Sharp was elected to the Bradford City board in February 1938. In July 1943 he put his name forward as the club manager when Fred Westgarth left to join Hartlepools United. He was manager for three years but never took charge of a competitive league match because of World War. Instead, he handed over the reins to Jack Barker in May 1946.

The same year, as the club's honorary secretary, at a meeting of the Division Three (North) committee he seconded a motion to introduce divisions Three and Four of the football league.

In 1947 he bought Norman Bank, a large house in Idle, to convert into a hostel for single City players needing accommodation. He also commissioned a City gramophone record, Hello Chorus.

He resigned from the City board in March 1948. Supporters bought an inscribed silver salver to recognise his ten years service to the club. It was presented by Lord Mayor Alderman Councillor F. J. Cowie. Fellow directors appointed Sharp and his wife Peggy as life-members of the club.
