= Charlie Bicknell (footballer) =

English footballer

Personal information
- Date of birth: 16 November 1905
- Place of birth: Chesterfield, England
- Date of death: 6 September 1994 (aged 88)
- Place of death: Cambridgeshire, England
- Height: 5 ft 11 in (1.80 m)
- Position: Left back

Senior career*
Years	Team	Apps	(Gls)
–	New Tupton Ivanhoe	?	(?)
1927–1930	Chesterfield	79	(0)
1930–1936	Bradford City	240	(2)
1936–1947	West Ham United	149	(0)
Total		468	(2)

Managerial career
- 1948–1951: Bedford Town
- * Club domestic league appearances and goals

Charles Bicknell (6 November 1905 – 6 September 1994) was an English professional footballer who played as a left back. Active between 1928 and 1947, Bicknell made over 450 appearances in the Football League.

== Career ==
Bicknell began his early career in non-league football, playing for teams such as New Tupton Ivanhoe, among others. He began his Football League career in October 1927 with Chesterfield, where he made 79 appearances between 1928 and 1930. He went on to play for Bradford City and West Ham United. He was captain of the West Ham United team that won the 1940 Football League War Cup Final, the wartime replacement of the FA Cup, beating Blackburn 1–0 at Wembley Stadium.

Bicknell left West Ham in 1947, and was appointed player-manager of Bedford Town in April 1948, where he remained in charge until 1951, after which he remained involved at the club until 1959.

== Personal life ==
Bicknell was related to ice skater Jayne Torvill, a cousin on her mother's side.
