= Ces Podd =

Saint Kitts and Nevis footballer (born 1952)

Personal information
- Full name: Cyril Casey Marcel Podd
- Date of birth: 7 August 1952 (age 74)
- Place of birth: Basseterre, Saint Kitts and Nevis
- Height: 5 ft 10 in (1.78 m)
- Position: Right-back

Youth career
- Bradford City

Senior career*
Years	Team	Apps	(Gls)
1970–1984	Bradford City	502	(3)
1984–1986	Halifax Town	57	(0)
1986–1988	Scarborough		
1988	Ossett Town		

International career
- Saint Kitts and Nevis

Managerial career
- 1999–2002: Saint Kitts and Nevis
- * Club domestic league appearances and goals

Cyril Casey Marcel Podd (born 7 August 1952) is a former professional footballer who played as a right-back. An international for Saint Kitts and Nevis he spent his professional career in England. He was one of the first black players to establish themselves in English football.

== Club career ==
A student at the Bradford College of Art, Podd made his professional debut in September 1970 for Bradford City. Over the next 14 years Podd made a total of 565 appearances for City in all competitions - a club record. He signed for Halifax Town in August 1984, and later played with Scarborough – with whom he secured promotion to the Football League – and Ossett Town.

His testimonial after 14 years at Bradford City was the first awarded to a black professional footballer. It featured a side of fellow professional black footballers, including Garth Crooks, Luther Blissett, Justin Fashanu, Vince Hilaire, Cyrille Regis and Terry Connor.

== International career ==
Podd played internationally for Saint Kitts and Nevis.

== Coaching career ==
Podd coached the Saint Kitts and Nevis national side between 1999 and 2002. He went on to coach the underprivileged in Leeds.

Podd became an assistant manager at Keighley Town in May 2026.

== Outside football ==
Podd owns a salsa-dancing company called X-ces.

== Honours ==
Scarborough

- Football Conference: 1986–87
