= Grenville Hair =

English footballer and manager

- Hair in his Leeds United kit

Personal information
- Full name: Kenneth Grenville Arthur Hair
- Date of birth: 16 November 1931
- Place of birth: Burton-upon-Trent, England
- Date of death: 7 March 1968 (aged 36)
- Place of death: Bradford, England
- Position: Left back

Youth career
- Leeds United

Senior career*
Years	Team	Apps	(Gls)
1948–1964	Leeds United	443	(1)

Managerial career
- 1964–1967: Wellington Town
- 1967–1968: Bradford City
- * Club domestic league appearances and goals

Kenneth Grenville Arthur Hair (16 November 1931 – 7 March 1968) was a footballer who played his entire professional career for Leeds United between 1948 and 1964. He later became the manager of Wellington Town and Bradford City. He died of a heart attack, aged 36, after supervising a training session at Bradford City.

== Playing career ==
Grenville Hair was a one-club man playing his entire professional career with Leeds United. He had been signed by manager Major Frank Buckley in 1948, and went on to make 474 appearances for the club as a left-back scoring just two goals. He was an almost ever-present in the Leeds side for ten years until the emergence of Willie Bell and Paul Reaney. In a poll of the 100 greatest ever Leeds United players, he was voted in at number 19.

== Managerial career ==
He stayed with Leeds until 1964, when he took up a player-manager position at Wellington Town. He stayed there until 1967, when he became coach at Bradford City and was soon promoted to the position of manager. He started an upturn in the club's fortunes in his short role as manager before his death, from a heart attack during a training session in March 1968.

He guided City to 11th in Division Four in 1966–67. The following season a run of seven wins from eight games was key to City's position towards the top of the table. On the day of his death, Hair had secured the services of Tony Leighton and Denis Atkins. They proved to be key additions to the squad as the club narrowly missed out on promotion but did so a season later.

== Career statistics ==
=== As a player ===
Appearances and goals by club, season and competition
Club	Season	League			FA Cup		League Cup		Total	
Club	Season	Division	Apps	Goals	Apps	Goals	Apps	Goals	Apps	Goals
Leeds United	1950–51	Second Division	2	0	0	0	—		2	0
Leeds United	1951–52	Second Division	27	0	5	0	—		32	0
Leeds United	1952–53	Second Division	40	0	1	0	—		41	0
Leeds United	1953–54	Second Division	42	0	2	0	—		44	0
Leeds United	1954–55	Second Division	42	0	2	0	—		44	0
Leeds United	1955–56	Second Division	34	0	1	0	—		35	0
Leeds United	1956–57	First Division	42	0	1	0	—		43	0
Leeds United	1957–58	First Division	34	0	1	0	—		35	0
Leeds United	1958–59	First Division	37	0	1	0	—		38	0
Leeds United	1959–60	First Division	32	0	1	0	—		33	0
Leeds United	1960–61	Second Division	39	0	1	0	4	0	44	0
Leeds United	1961–62	Second Division	38	1	2	0	3	0	43	1
Leeds United	1962–63	Second Division	26	0	3	1	1	0	30	1
Leeds United	1963–64	Second Division	8	0	0	0	2	0	10	0
Career total			443	1	21	1	10	0	474	2

=== As a manager ===
Managerial record by team and tenure
Team	From	To	Record				
Team	From	To	G	W	D	L	Win %
Bradford City	1967	7 March 1968	61	28	11	22	45.90
Total			61	28	11	22	45.90
