= Bradford City A.F.C. =

Association football club in England

Bradford City
- Full name: Bradford City Association Football Club
- Nicknames: The Bantams; The Paraders; The Citizens
- Founded: 1903; 123 years ago
- Ground: Valley Parade
- Capacity: 24,840
- Coordinates: 53°48′15″N 001°45′32″W
- Chairman: Stefan Rupp
- Manager: Michael Duff
- League: EFL League One
- 2025–26: EFL League One, 4th of 24
- Website: bradfordcityafc.com
Home colours	Away colours	Third colours

Bradford City Association Football Club is an English professional football club in Bradford, West Yorkshire. The club competes in EFL League One, the third tier of English football, and is managed by Michael Duff.

The club was founded in 1903 and immediately elected into the Football League Second Division. Promotion to the top tier followed as they won the 1907–08 Second Division title and then they went on to win the 1911 FA Cup final, which remains the club's only major honour. They were relegated in 1922 and again in 1927, before winning the Third Division North title in 1928–29. Another relegation in 1937 did allow the club to go on to win the Third Division North Cup in 1939, however a further relegation followed in 1962 to leave the club in the newly created Fourth Division. They secured promotions back into the third tier in 1969 and 1977, but were relegated in 1972 and 1978. They found success in the 1980s under the stewardship of first Roy McFarland and then Trevor Cherry, winning promotion in 1981–82 and following this up with the Third Division title in 1984–85, though they were relegated out of the Second Division in 1990.

Bradford were promoted back into the second tier via the play-offs in 1996, before securing another promotion in 1998–99 to reach the Premier League, marking a return to the top-flight after a 77-year absence. They entered Europe and reached the semi-finals of the UEFA Intertoto Cup in 2000–01 but ended the campaign with relegation from the Premier League. A succession of financial crises followed as the club entered administration twice in two years and further relegations followed in 2004 and 2007 to leave the club back in the fourth tier. They found success under the management of Phil Parkinson by reaching the 2013 League Cup final and then going on to win that year's League Two play-off final but were relegated from League One in 2019.

The club's home ground is the 24,840-capacity Valley Parade, which was the site of the Bradford City stadium fire on 11 May 1985, which took the lives of 56 supporters. They are the only professional football club in England to wear claret and amber, and have worn these colours throughout their history. They have though been known by various nicknames, with the "Bantams" being the most commonly used nickname as it appears on the current club crest. Supporters hold West Yorkshire derby rivalries with Huddersfield Town and Leeds United, as well as a historic Bradford derby rivalry with the now non-league side Bradford (Park Avenue).

== History ==
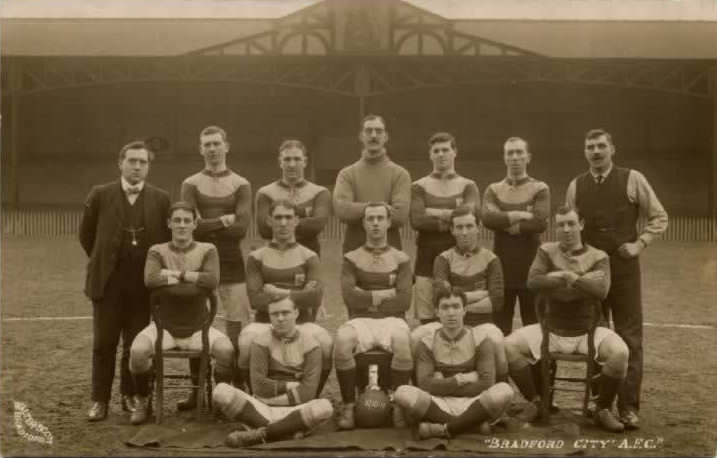
The Bradford City team which won the 1911 FA Cup

Bradford City were formed in 1903 as a result of a series of meetings called by James Whyte, a sub-editor of the Bradford Observer, with Football Association representatives and officials at Manningham F.C., a rugby league side. The Football League saw the invitation as a chance to promote association football in the rugby league-dominated county of the West Riding of Yorkshire. It duly elected the new club into the Second Division, in place of Doncaster Rovers. Four days later, at the 23rd annual meeting of Manningham FC, the committee decided to change codes from rugby league to association football. Bradford City Association Football Club were formed without having played a game, taking over Manningham's colours of claret and amber, and their Valley Parade ground.

Robert Campbell was appointed the club's first manager and with the help of the new committee, he assembled a playing squad at the cost of £917 10s 0d. City's first game was a 2–0 defeat at Grimsby Town on 1 September 1903, six days before their first home game attracted 11,000 fans. The club finished 10th in their first season. Peter O'Rourke took over as manager in November 1905, and he led City to the Second Division title in 1907–08 and with it promotion to the First Division. Having narrowly avoided relegation in their first season in the top flight, City recorded their highest finish of 5th in 1910–11. The same season they won the FA Cup, when a goal from captain Jimmy Speirs won the final replay against Newcastle United. City's defence of the cup, which included the first Bradford derby against Bradford Park Avenue, was stopped by Barnsley after a run of 12 consecutive clean sheets.

A graph showing Bradford City's league history

City remained in the top flight in the period up to the First World War and for three seasons afterwards, but were relegated in 1921–22 along with Manchester United. Back in the Second Division, attendances dropped and City struggled for form, with five consecutive finishes in the bottom half of the table. They suffered a second relegation to the Third Division (North) in 1926–27. Two seasons later, O'Rourke, who had initially retired in 1921 following the death of his son, returned and guided City to promotion with a record haul of 128 goals. O'Rourke left for a second time after one more season, and although City spent a total of eight seasons back in the Second Division, they rarely looked like earning promotion back to the top flight. Instead in 1936–37, the club were relegated back to the Third Division (North). City won their third piece of silverware two seasons later, when they lifted the Third Division North Challenge Cup, but they were unable to defend the trophy because competitive football was suspended for the Second World War.

After the war, City went through two managers in the first two seasons, and were consistently in the bottom half of the Third Division (North) table until 1955–56. After three successive top half finishes, City were placed in the new national Third Division in 1958–59. Bradford spent just three seasons in the Third Division, but during their relegation season in 1960–61, they upset First Division side Manchester United in the inaugural season of the League Cup. With 34 goals from David Layne, City nearly earned promotion the following season 1961–62, but did also suffer a record 9–1 defeat to Colchester United. Layne left for Sheffield Wednesday, and without him City finished second from bottom of the league and had to apply for re-election. Bradford City just failed to win promotion in 1963–64, winning more games than any other team in the division that season, twenty five, with Rodney Green top scoring with 29 league goals. There followed three difficult seasons during which time manager Grenville Hair died following a heart attack in training, City returned to the Third Division after getting promoted in 1968–69. City's stay in the Third Division lasted just three years, when they finished bottom in 1971–72. Promotion via fourth spot was won again in 1976–77 but it was instantly followed by a relegation season.

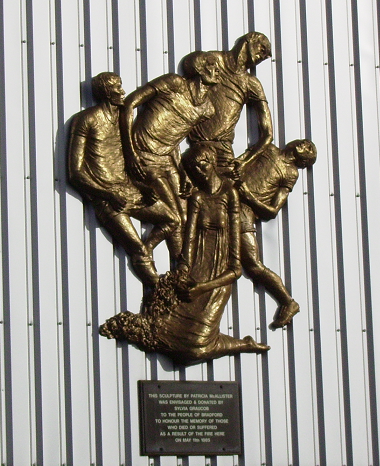
A memorial, erected on the club's new main stand at Valley Parade, to the victims of the fire in 1985

City failed to win promotion for three successive seasons, until the board appointed former England centre back Roy McFarland as manager in May 1981. McFarland won promotion in his first season, but was poached by his former club Derby County just six months later. City won compensation from Derby and installed another England international Trevor Cherry as McFarland's replacement. Cherry, with former teammate Terry Yorath as his assistant manager, failed to win for two months, but eventually the pair guided City to safety from relegation. During the summer, however, the club chairman Bob Martin had to call in the official receivers. The club was saved by former chairman Stafford Heginbotham and former board member Jack Tordoff, but to ensure the club could start the new season, prize asset, striker Bobby Campbell was sold to Derby. City struggled but so did Campbell, and when he returned, the club went on a record run of ten successive victories. Although they missed out on promotion, City won the league the following season 1984–85, to return to the second tier of the Football League. However, City's triumph was overshadowed when the main stand at Valley Parade caught fire during the final game of the season, killing 56 people.

City played games away from Valley Parade for 19 months. But just ten days after the new £2.6 million ground was opened, Cherry was sacked. His replacement, Terry Dolan, steered City away from possible relegation, before he mounted a promotion challenge the following season. City went top of the table in September 1987, but fell away during Christmas and missed out on promotion on the final day of the season. Instead, they entered the play-offs but were defeated in the semi-finals by Middlesbrough. Two years later City were relegated back to the Third Division. For three seasons, City finished mid-table in the third tier, which was renamed Division Two following the formation of the Premier League in 1992.

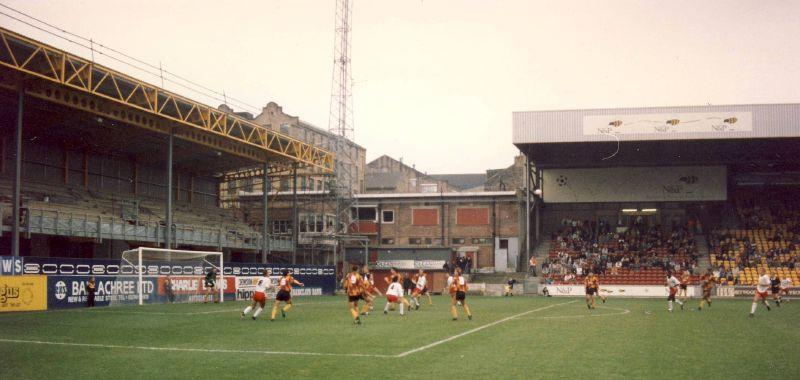
Bradford City against Fulham at Valley Parade during the early 1990s

In January 1994, Geoffrey Richmond came from Scarborough to take over as chairman, and promised to guide City to the Premier League within five years. He cleared the debts and after four months sacked manager Frank Stapleton to appoint his own manager, Lennie Lawrence. Lawrence left after little more than a year to join Luton Town but his successor, Chris Kamara, took City to the play-offs and their first game at Wembley Stadium. They defeated Notts County 2–0 in the final to earn promotion to Division One. City avoided relegation the following season by winning their last two league games, 1–0 against Charlton Athletic and then beating Queens Park Rangers 3–0 on the final day of the season, but Kamara was sacked in January 1998. Paul Jewell took over, initially on a temporary basis, before he was given a permanent contract. He bought the club's first £1 million signings and guided the club to the Premier League—the first time they had been in the top flight for 77 years—with a second-place finish. The following season, Jewell continued to defy the critics, who labelled his team Dad's Army, by avoiding relegation again on the last day with a 1–0 victory over Liverpool, with a goal from David Wetherall.

However, Jewell left shortly afterwards. His assistant Chris Hutchings was promoted to the manager's position, and despite a series of new expensive signings, he was sacked by November 2000, with City second from bottom of the league. Jim Jefferies took over but could not save the club from relegation. At the end of the first season back in Division One, City were placed in administration with debts of nearly £13 million. Two years later, the club suffered a second spell in administration and a second relegation. Two top-half finishes followed, but the club were relegated for a third time in seven seasons in 2006–07 meaning the following season would be their first in the bottom tier for 26 seasons. Former player Stuart McCall was appointed the new manager, and although he said anything less than promotion would be a failure, he finally led the team to a 10th-place finish. McCall eventually left Bradford City on 8 February 2010 following a board meeting after a run of poor results.

In September 2011, the club became linked with American amateur side SC United Bantams.

In January 2013, City became the first club from the fourth tier of English football since Rochdale in 1962 to reach the League Cup final, and the first fourth tier club ever to reach a major Wembley Cup final. They defeated three Premier League sides en route to the final – Wigan Athletic 4–2 on penalties in the fourth round, Arsenal 3–2 on penalties in the quarter-finals and Aston Villa 4–3 on aggregate over the two legs of the semi-final. They met Premier League side Swansea City in the final at Wembley but lost 5–0. The run to the final is thought to have been worth at least £1.3 million to the club, with joint chairman Mark Lawn stating that the final itself could be worth an additional £1 million, taking the club's total earnings to £2.3 million during their cup campaign. On 18 May 2013, the club returned to Wembley where they defeated Northampton Town 3–0 in the League Two play-off final to secure a place in League One for 2013–14.

On 24 January 2015, Bradford City caused an upset by beating Premiership leaders Chelsea 4–2 away in the FA Cup. The victory sent Bradford through to the fifth round for the first time in eighteen years. They beat Sunderland, another Premier League club, 2–0 at home in the next round on 15 February 2015. In the quarter-finals, the Bantams faced Reading at home, in a game that ended in a goalless draw. The replay was played on 16 March 2015 at the Madejski Stadium, where Reading won 3–0.

The club was relegated to League Two at the end of the 2018–19 season.

In December 2021, the club was approached by American investors known as WAGMI United (who use cryptocurrency and NFTs) about a possible buyout. The offer was rejected.

On 24 February 2022, Mark Hughes was appointed manager of the club on a contract until the summer of 2024. He was sacked on 4 October 2023, with player Kevin McDonald becoming player-caretaker manager. Later that month, assistant manager Mark Trueman replaced McDonald as caretaker manager. On 6 November, Graham Alexander was signed as manager until the end of the 2026–27 season, with Chris Lucketti as assistant manager.

Bradford City were promoted to League One on the last day of the 2024–25 EFL season after their victory over Fleetwood Town which secured the third-place promotion place.

== Colours and club crest ==
Bradford City is the only professional football club in England to wear claret and amber. The club colours were inherited from Manningham FC, when the club converted to football upon Bradford City's foundation in 1903. However, whereas Manningham played in hoops, the new football club adopted claret and amber stripes. Manningham RFC adopted the colours in 1884 before the move to Valley Parade in 1886. Having originally worn black shirts with white shorts, the club's first game in claret and amber was against Hull on 20 September 1884, at Carlisle Road.

The reason Manningham chose claret and amber is not documented but the colours were the same as those of The Prince of Wales's Own West Yorkshire Regiment, which was based at Belle Vue Barracks on nearby Manningham Lane. Both Manningham, from 1886, and Bradford City, from 1903 to 1908, used the barracks as changing and club rooms.

Bradford City has worn claret and amber, with either white or black, since it was founded. Since the fire in 1985, the club has used black on the kit as a memorial to the 56 supporters who died. The club's away shirt has traditionally been white and to a lesser extent also blue, but there has been a profusion of other colours and designs particularly in more recent years. The away kit for the 2008–09 season was all white. For the 2009–10 season, the away kit was all black with a thin claret and amber stripe down the centre-left.

City scarves have also sold in large numbers in recent years to fans of Harry Potter, because the colours are the same as Harry's house scarf at Hogwarts School.

A number of other clubs across the world wear claret and amber. They include Scottish club Motherwell, who originally wore blue and white until they wore claret and amber for the first time on 23 August 1913, against Celtic. It is erroneously believed that Motherwell chose the claret and amber colours because they were the racing colours of Lord Hamilton; it is more likely that Motherwell were influenced by Bradford City's English FA cup win in 1911.

The club's crest combines a series of logos from over the years. In 1974, City adopted a contemporary style crest incorporating the club's initials, with a B-C logo. At the time, the new logo maintained the previous nickname of the Paraders. By December 1981, the club relaunched the Bantams as the official identity with a bantam on the new crest. The crest maintains the club colours and also includes the words The Bantams.

== Nickname ==
Bradford City have had a number of nicknames during their history. In their early years, they were referred to as the "Robins" or "Wasps", taking over the nickname of Manningham FC, as a result of Manningham's claret and amber hoops. Other nicknames have been the "Citizens" or "Paraders", but the club is better known as the "Bantams".

The "Bantams" nickname is thought to have become popular during the First World War, when the club's stadium Valley Parade was used as a recruiting station for the West Yorkshire Regiment which was raising Pals Battalions, with some of them called "Bantams Battalions" due to the short height of many of the recruits being, between 5 ft (1.5m) tall and no more than 5 ft 3in (1.6m).The Bradford Pals had Bantam soldiers within its ranks.

== Stadium ==
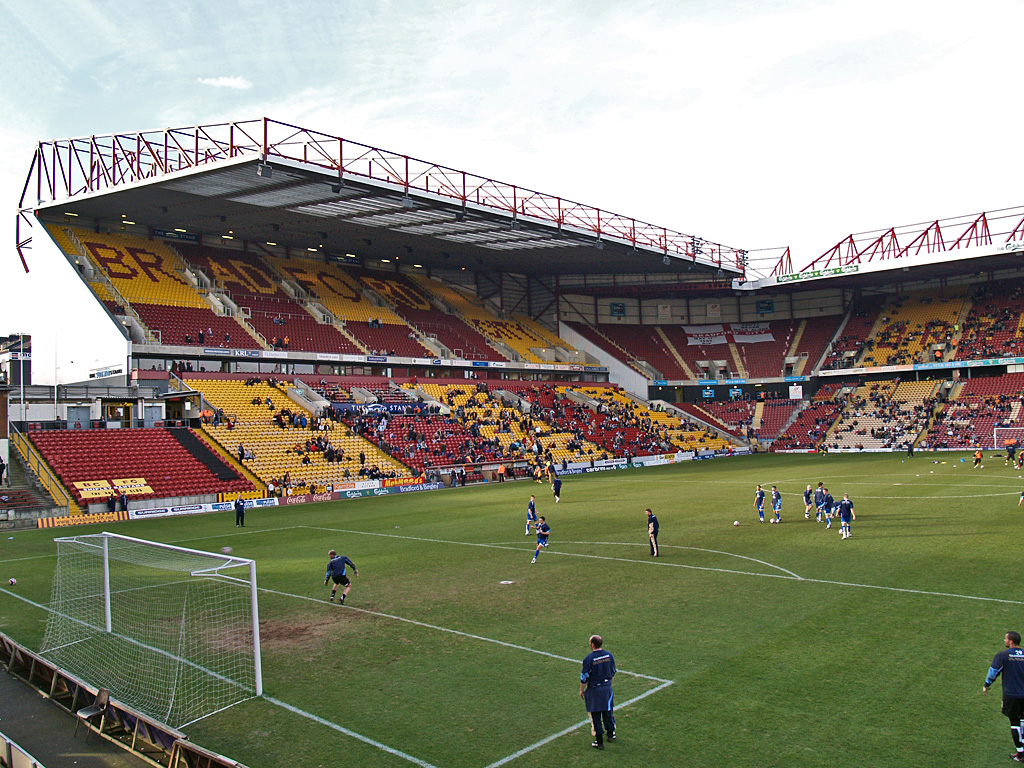
Valley Parade

Valley Parade was the site of a quarry on the hillside below Manningham, Bradford, owned by Midland Railway Company, in 1886, when Manningham RFC bought one-third of the land and leased the remainder, because they had been forced to find a new home. They spent £1,400 erecting a ground with a capacity of 20,000, club facilities and levelling the land. When Bradford City were formed in 1903, they took over the ground at Valley Parade, which was also at this time the headquarters of The 2nd West Riding Brigade Royal Field Artillery (Territorial Force), playing their first home game on 5 September 1903 against Gainsborough Trinity, drawing a crowd of 11,000. Five years later, the club won promotion to the First Division, and so commissioned football architect Archibald Leitch to redevelop the ground. The capacity was increased to 40,000 by December 1908 with a 5,300-seater main stand, a terraced paddock in front, a Spion Kop, and an 8,000-capacity Midland Road stand. Its first game against Bristol City on Christmas Day attracted a crowd of 36,000. On 11 March 1911, Valley Parade attracted its highest attendance of 39,146, for an FA Cup game between Bradford City and Burnley during Bradford's FA Cup winning run.

Until 1952, by which time Bradford City had bought the remaining two-thirds of the ground to own it outright, the ground remained virtually unchanged. However, twice during the next decade, the club's Midland Road stand had to be demolished. Club officials first closed part of the stand in 1952, as a result of the Burnden Park disaster six years earlier. Its frame was sold to Berwick Rangers and a replacement stand built in 1954. Six years later, the new stand was itself demolished, and Valley Parade remained a three-sided ground until 1966, when the pitch was moved, and a new stand built.

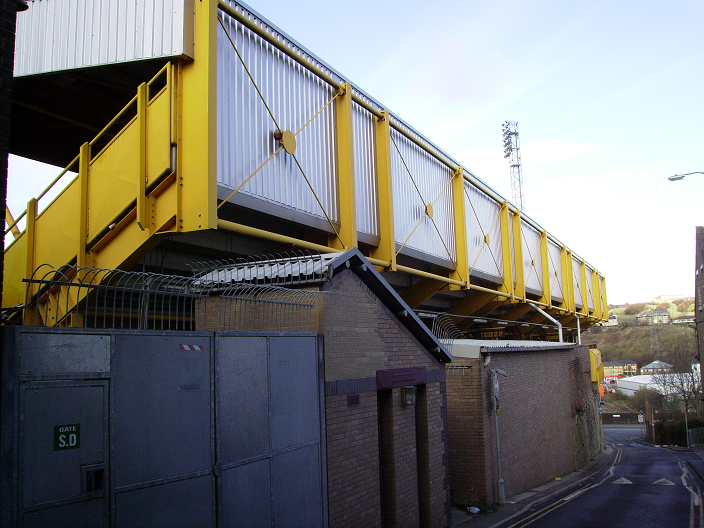
The Bradford End of Valley Parade, which was the first to be redeveloped after the ground reopened in 1986

On 11 May 1985, Valley Parade was the scene of a fatal fire, during which 56 supporters were killed and at least 265 were injured. The game was the final match of the 1984–85 season, before which City were presented with the Third Division championship trophy. The fire destroyed the wooden main stand in just nine minutes. The club played its home games at Odsal Stadium, a rugby league ground in Bradford, Elland Road, Leeds, and Leeds Road, the former home of Huddersfield Town, until December 1986, while Valley Parade was redeveloped. The club spent £2.6 million building a new main stand and improving the Kop and reopened the new ground on 14 December 1986 for an exhibition match against an England international XI.

In 1991, the Bradford end of the ground was the next to be redeveloped and was converted into a two-tier stand with a scoreboard. In 1996, following City's promotion to Division One, club chairman Geoffrey Richmond announced the construction of a 4,500 seater stand on the Midland Road side. Ahead of promotion to the Premiership in 1999, Richmond spent another £6.5 million to convert the Kop into a two-tier 7,500-seat capacity stand. A corner stand between the Kop and main stand was opened in December 2000, taking the capacity to 20,000 for the first time since 1970. The following summer, the main stand was also converted into a two-tier stand, taking the capacity to 24,840. Further projects were planned until the club went into administration in May 2002 so none have taken place.

In August 2003, Valley Parade was sold to Gibb's pension fund for £5 million, with the club's offices, the shop and car park sold to London-based Development Securities for £2.5 million, but these (club offices, shop and car park) were bought back by the club's joint chairmen in the summer of 2011. The club's annual rent and maintenance costs to Gibb's pension fund is £1.2m, and so as of February 2009, the club is considering a return to Odsal. The club and Bradford Bulls would share the new £50m complex, which would also feature cricket, cycling and athletics facilities. Valley Parade has had several other names under sponsorship naming deals. In July 2016 it became the Northern Commercials Stadium, and in July 2019 it became the Utilita Energy Stadium. This partnership came to an end in July 2022. The University of Bradford subsequently became title sponsor of Valley Parade. This partnership came to an end in July 2026 when the American banking service, Mbanq, took over as the main sponsor of the stadium.

== Supporters ==
The club spearheaded an initiative in 2007 to slash the price of watching professional football for the 2007–08 season. As a result, season tickets to watch Bradford City were the cheapest in England at £138, the equivalent of £6 per match. When the offer finished, the club confirmed the amount of season tickets sold was 12,019. The scheme enabled the club to top the average league attendances for Football League Two during the 2007–08 season, attracting more than three times more than any other club. The club won the Perform Best Fan Marketing campaign category in The Football League Awards for the scheme and earned them an invitation to the Houses of Parliament. The club aimed to attract 20,000 fans for the 2008–09 by offering a free season ticket to anyone buying a season ticket as long as 9,000 adults sign up, but they fell 704 short of the target.

For the 2015–16 season, the club announced its latest season ticket scheme aimed at continuing to make football affordable for fans. Season ticket prices were set at £149 for adults, senior citizens and students, while admission for under-11s was free when purchased with an adult ticket. An initial campaign target of 15,000 was set. On 6 July, the club announced a record-breaking 18,000 tickets had been sold following a successful campaign. The campaign was repeated for the 2016–17 season, where the club sold in excess of 17,000 tickets.

Bradford City announced 'Own The Moment' 2022–23 season ticket sales of 14,190 in September 2022. The figure was a League Two record for the club. It surpassed the previous fourth-tier season-ticket sales record of 13,614 in 2019–20.

On 4 March 2023, Bradford City set a new attendance record for Football League Two at a 2–0 victory against Colchester United, with an attendance of 20,383, including 345 away fans. The Bantams then broke this record again in a home fixture on 8 May 2023 against Leyton Orient, with 22,576 supporters in attendance, including 1,902 Leyton Orient fans.

== Rivalry ==
Bradford City have participated in the Bradford derby with city rivals Bradford Park Avenue. The West Yorkshire derby is held between City and local rivals Leeds United and Huddersfield Town. A "friendly" rivalry also existed with now-defunct club Halifax Town.

According to a survey conducted in August 2019, Bradford City fans also see Burnley, Barnsley and Oldham Athletic as rivals.

== European football ==
Bradford City's only participation in European football to date came in the 2000 UEFA Intertoto Cup.

Season	Competition	Round	Opponents	1st leg	2nd leg	Aggregate
2000	UEFA Intertoto Cup	Second round	(Lithuania) FK Atlantas	3–1	4–1	7–2
2000	UEFA Intertoto Cup	Third round	(Netherlands) RKC Waalwijk	2–0	1–0	3–0
2000	UEFA Intertoto Cup	Semi–finals	(Russia) FC Zenit Saint Petersburg	0–1	0–3	0–4

== Players ==
=== Current squad ===
As of 20 November 2026

Note: Flags indicate national team as defined under FIFA eligibility rules; some limited exceptions apply. Players may hold more than one non-FIFA nationality.

No.	Pos.	Nation	Player
1	GK	ENG	Cameron Dawson
2	DF	ENG	Reece Welch
3	DF	GAM	Ibou Touray
5	DF	ENG	Macaulay Gillesphey
6	MF	ENG	Callum Connolly
7	DF	ENG	Josh Neufville
8	MF	ENG	Adam Phillips
9	FW	ENG	Jake Beesley
10	MF	ENG	Antoni Sarcevic (captain)
11	FW	ENG	Stephen Humphrys
13	GK	IRL	Colin Doyle
14	DF	AUS	Hayden Matthews (on loan from Portsmouth)
15	DF	ENG	Aden Baldwin
16	DF	ENG	George Pratt (on loan from Blackburn Rovers)
17	MF	IRL	Tyreik Wright

No.	Pos.	Nation	Player
19	FW	ENG	Kayden Jackson
20	MF	ENG	Henry Cartwright
21	GK	SCO	Jon McCracken
22	MF	ENG	Kieran Morgan (on loan from Queens Park Rangers)
23	MF	ENG	Bobby Pointon
24	FW	ENG	Will Swan
25	MF	ENG	Nick Powell
27	DF	ENG	Corey O'Keeffe
28	DF	ENG	Matthew Pennington
29	FW	ENG	Harry Ibbitson
31	GK	ENG	Zac Hadi
32	MF	ENG	George Lapslie
42	DF	ENG	Oliver Hewitt
43	MF	ENG	Leroy Gomes
44	MF	ENG	Gabe Holt

==== Out on loan ====
Note: Flags indicate national team as defined under FIFA eligibility rules; some limited exceptions apply. Players may hold more than one non-FIFA nationality.

No. / Pos. / Nation / Player; 30 / DF / ENG / Oscar Lunn (on loan at Whitby Town)	No. / Pos. / Nation / Player; — / MF / ENG / Tommy Leigh (on loan at Bristol Rovers)

=== Player of the Year ===
Year	Winner
1984–85	(England) Dave Evans
1994–95	(England) Wayne Jacobs
1996–97	(England) Wayne Jacobs
1997–98	(England) Gary Walsh
1998–99	(Scotland) Stuart McCall
2001–02	(England) Andy Myers
2002–03	(Scotland) Andy Gray
2003–04	(England) Paul Heckingbottom
2004–05	(England) Mark Bower
2005–06	(England) David Wetherall
2006–07	(England) Nathan Doyle
2007–08	(England) Joe Colbeck
2008–09	(England) Luke O'Brien
2009–10	(England) James Hanson
2010–11	No award
2011–12	(England) Luke Oliver
2012–13	(England) Gary Jones
2013–14	(England) Stephen Darby
2014–15	(Northern Ireland) Rory McArdle
2015–16	(England) Reece Burke
2016–17	(Jamaica) Mark Marshall
2017–18	(England) Matthew Kilgallon
2018–19	No award
2019–20	No award
2020–21	(Republic of Ireland) Paudie O'Connor
2021–22	(Republic of Ireland) Paudie O'Connor
2022–23	(England) Andy Cook
2023–24	(England) Brad Halliday
2024–25	(England) Richard Smallwood
2025–26	(England) Antoni Sarcevic

=== Captains ===
The following is a list of the officially appointed captains of the Bradford City first-team.

Name	Nation	Years	Notes	Ref
Dicky Bond	England	1919–1922		
Charlie Bicknell	England	1934–1936		
Tommy Flockett	England	c. 1955–1960		
Bruce Stowell	England	1967–1972		
Rod Johnson	England	1970s		
Peter Jackson	England	1982–1986	City's youngest captain (started at 21 years old)	
Stuart McCall	Scotland	1998–2002		
David Wetherall	England	2002–2008		
Graeme Lee	England	2008–2009		
Peter Thorne	England	2009–2010		
Zesh Rehman	Pakistan	2009–2010	Club captain	
Simon Ramsden	England	2010–2011		
Lee Bullock	England	2010–2011	Club captain	
Guy Branston	England	2011		
Michael Flynn	Wales	2011–2012		
Ricky Ravenhill	England	2012		
Gary Jones	England	2012–2014		
Stephen Darby	England	2014–2016		
Romain Vincelot	France	2016–2018		
Josh Wright	England	2018		
Anthony O'Connor	Republic of Ireland	2018–2019		
Paul Caddis	Scotland	2019		
Hope Akpan	Nigeria	2019		
Paudie O'Connor	Republic of Ireland	2019		
James Vaughan	England	2019–2020		
Clayton Donaldson	Jamaica	2020	Became captain after Vaughan left the club on loan in January 2020	
Richard O'Donnell	England	2020–2021		
Lee Novak	England	2021	Announced as temporary captain in January 2021 whilst O'Donnell was injured (for 3 months)	
Paudie O'Connor	Republic of Ireland	2021	Announced as temporary captain following an injury to Novak	
Richard O'Donnell	England	2021	O'Donnell returned to first-team action - and as captain - on 20 March 2021	
Niall Canavan	Republic of Ireland	2021–2022		
Paudie O'Connor	Republic of Ireland	2022	Captain following Canavan's departure mid-season	
Richie Smallwood	England	2022–2025	Left the club at the end of the 2024–25 season, following promotion	
Max Power	England	2025–2026	Sold to former club Wigan Athletic	
Antoni Sarcevic	England	2026–		

=== Former players ===
In 2007 former Telegraph & Argus sports journalist David Markham released the book The Legends of Bradford City, initially written to mark the club's centenary in 2003. It featured biographies of 100 players and staff members from the history of the club. The players were:

- (England) Greg Abbott
- (England) Bruce Bannister
- (England) Sam Barkas
- (Scotland) Bobby Bauld
- (England) Peter Beagrie
- (England) Charlie Bicknell
- (England) Robbie Blake
- (England) Dicky Bond
- (England) Irvine Boocock
- (Scotland) Tommy Cairns
- (Northern Ireland) Bobby Campbell
- (Scotland) Robert Campbell
- (England) Eddie Carr
- (England) Trevor Cherry
- (Dominica) Joe Cooke
- (England) Ian Cooper
- (England) Terry Dolan
- (England) Peter Downsborough
- (England) Donald Duckett
- (England) Lee Duxbury
- (England) Roy Ellam
- (England) Mark Ellis
- (England) Dave Evans
- (Scotland) Jock Ewart
- (England) Tommy Flockett
- (England) Oscar Fox
- (England) David Fretwell
- (England) Allan Gilliver
- (Scotland) David Gray
- (England) John Hall
- (Wales) Tom Hallett
- (England) John Hallows
- (England) Bobby Ham
- (England) Joe Hargreaves
- (England) Derek Hawksworth
- (Scotland) John Hendrie
- (England) George Hinsley
- (England) Don Hutchins
- (England) Gerry Ingram
- (England) David Jackson
- (England) Peter Jackson (born 1937)
- (England) Peter Jackson (born 1961)
- (England) Wayne Jacobs
- (England) Paul Jewell
- (England) Rod Johnson
- (England) Chris Kamara
- (Republic of Ireland) Jimmy Lawlor
- (Jamaica) Jamie Lawrence
- (England) David Layne
- (Wales) Ken Leek
- (Scotland) Peter Logan
- (Scotland) Stuart McCall
- (Wales) Sean McCarthy
- (Scotland) John McCole
- (Scotland) Jimmy McDonald
- (England) Roy McFarland
- (Scotland) Andy McGill
- (Scotland) Jimmy McLaren
- (Scotland) David McNiven
- (England) John Middleton
- (Scotland) Brian Mitchell
- (England) Charlie Moore
- (Scotland) George Mulholland
- (Wales) George Murphy
- (England) Graham Oates
- (Republic of Ireland) Andy O'Brien
- (England) Gavin Oliver
- (England) Ian Ormondroyd
- (Scotland) Frank O'Rourke
- (Scotland) Peter O'Rourke
- (England) Harold Peel
- (Saint Kitts and Nevis) Ces Podd
- (Wales) Ivor Powell
- (England) John Reid
- (England) Dean Richards
- (England) Arthur Rigby
- (England) George Robinson
- (England) Abe Rosenthal
- (England) Lee Sinnott
- (England) Geoff Smith
- (Scotland) Jimmy Speirs
- (England) Derek Stokes
- (England) Charlie Storer
- (England) Bruce Stowell
- (England) Paul Tomlinson
- (Scotland) Bob Torrance
- (England) Whelan Ward
- (England) Dickie Watmough
- (Scotland) Billy Watson
- (England) Garry Watson
- (England) Bobby Webb
- (England) David Wetherall
- (England) Jock Whyte
- (England) George Williamson
- (England) Dean Windass

== Staff ==
=== Current staff ===
As of 10 November 2026

Position	Name	Nationality
Chairman	Stefan Rupp	German
Chief Executive Officer	Ryan Sparks	English
General Manager	Davide Longo	English
Head of Football Operations	David Sharpe	English
Manager	Michael Duff	Northern Irish
Assistant Manager	Alex Morris	English
First Team Coach	Mark Trueman	English
Goalkeeping Coach	Colin Doyle	Irish
Lead professional development phase coach	Luke Hendrie	English
Professional development phase link coach	Patrick McGuire	English
Academy head of coaching	Tom Butcher	English
Head of recruitment	Stephen Gent	English
Foundation phase lead coach	Jack Fairbrother	English
Scout	Ray Mathias	English
Scout	Stan Martin	English
Performance Coach	Ben Nicholson	English
Academy Manager	Tom Calvert	English
Academy Lead Youth Development	Jordan Broadbent	English
Head of Academy Analysis	Jordan Davison	English
Under-16 coach	Gary Jones	English
Head of Medical	Bobby Scarborough	English
Head of Performance	Tom Eastwood	English
First-Team Therapist	Nick Akerman	English
Head of Physical Performance	Vacant	English
First-Team Analyst and Player Welfare Officer	Robbie Bloodworth	English

=== Former managers ===
- (Scotland) Robert Campbell (1903–1905)
- (Scotland) Peter O'Rourke (1905–1921)
- (Scotland) David Menzies (1921–1926)
- (England) Colin Veitch (1926–1928)
- (England) Jack Foster (Caretaker manager) (Jan–May 1928)
- (Scotland) Peter O'Rourke (1928–1930)
- (England) Jack Peart (1930–1935)
- (England) Dick Ray (1935–1937)
- (England) Fred Westgarth (1938–1943)
- (England) Bob Sharp (1943–1946)
- (England) Jack Barker (1946–1947)
- (England) Jack Milburn (1947–1948)
- (Scotland) David Steele (1948–1952)
- (England) Albert Harris (Feb–May 1952) (interim manager)
- (Wales) Ivor Powell (1952–1955)
- (England) Peter Jackson (1955–1961)
- (England) Bob Brocklebank (1961–1964)
- (Wales) Bill Harris (1965–1966)
- (England) Willie Watson (1966–1967)
- (England) Grenville Hair (1967–1968)
- (Scotland) (Wales) Jim McAnearney & Tom Hallett (Joint caretaker managers) (Mar–May 1968)
- (England) Jimmy Wheeler (1968–1971)
- (England) Ray Wilson (Player/caretaker manager) (Sep–November 1971)
- (England) Bryan Edwards (1971–1975)
- (Scotland) Bobby Kennedy (1975–1978)
- (Northern Ireland) John Napier (Feb–October 1978)
- (Scotland) George Mulhall (1978–1981)
- (England) Roy McFarland (1981–1982)
- (England) Trevor Cherry (1982–1987)
- (England) Terry Dolan (1987–1989)
- (Wales) Terry Yorath (1989–1990)
- (Scotland) John Docherty (1990–1991)
- (Republic of Ireland) Frank Stapleton (1991–1994)
- (England) Lennie Lawrence (1994–1995)
- (England) Chris Kamara (1995–1998)
- (England) Paul Jewell (1998–2000)
- (England) Chris Hutchings (June–Nov 2000)
- (Scotland) Stuart McCall (Player/caretaker manager) (Nov 2000)
- (Scotland) Jim Jefferies (2000–2001)
- (England) Steve Smith (Caretaker manager) (December 2001)
- (England) Nicky Law (2002–2003)
- (England) Peter Atherton, Wayne Jacobs, David Wetherall and Dean Windass (player/caretaker managers) (November 2003)
- (England) Bryan Robson (2003–2004)
- (England) Colin Todd (2004–2007)
- (England) David Wetherall (Player/caretaker manager) (Feb–May 2007)
- (Scotland) Stuart McCall (2007–2010)
- (England) Wayne Jacobs (Caretaker manager) (February 2010)
- (England) Peter Taylor (February 2010 – February 2011)
- (England) Peter Jackson (March 2011 – August 2011)
- (England) Colin Cooper (Caretaker manager) (August 2011)
- (England) Phil Parkinson (August 2011 – June 2016)
- (Scotland) Stuart McCall (June 2016 – February 2018)
- (England) Greg Abbott (caretaker manager) (February 2018)
- (England) Simon Grayson (February 2018 – May 2018)
- (Republic of Ireland) Michael Collins (June 2018 – September 2018)
- (Scotland) David Hopkin (September 2018 – February 2019)
- (England) Martin Drury (Caretaker manager) (February 2019 – March 2019)
- (England) Gary Bowyer (March 2019 – February 2020)
- (Scotland) Stuart McCall (February 2020 – December 2020)
- (England) Mark Trueman and Connor Sellars (joint caretaker managers; December 2020–February 2021)
- (England) Mark Trueman and Connor Sellars (February 2021 – May 2021)
- (Scotland) Derek Adams (June 2021 - February 2022)
- (England) Mark Trueman (caretaker manager; February 2022)
- (Wales) Mark Hughes (February 2022 – October 2023)
- (Scotland) Kevin McDonald (caretaker manager; October 2023)
- (England) Mark Trueman (caretaker manager; October 2023 – November 2023)
- (Scotland) Graham Alexander (November 2023 – September 2026)
- (England) Mark Trueman and (Republic of Ireland) Colin Doyle (joint caretaker managers; September 2026–October 2026)
- (Northern Ireland) Michael Duff (October 2026–present)

== Honours and records ==
League

- Second Division / First Division (level 2)
  - Champions: 1907–08
  - Runners-up: 1998–99

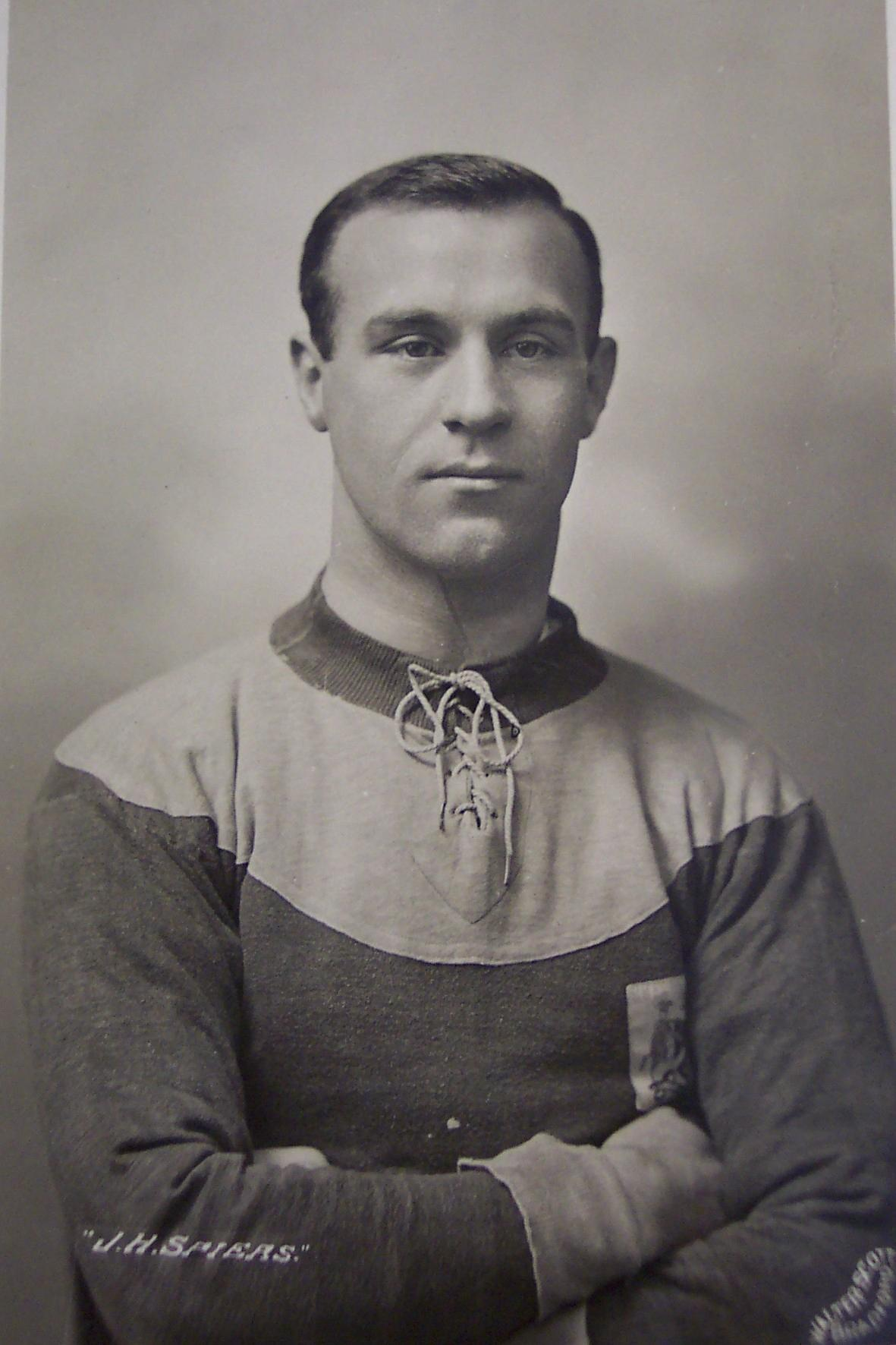
Bradford City's 1911 FA Cup final winning goalscorer Jimmy Speirs

- Third Division North / Third Division / Second Division (level 3)
  - Champions: 1928–29, 1984–85
  - Play-off winners: 1996
- Fourth Division / League Two (level 4)
  - Runners-up: 1981–82
  - Promoted: 1968–69, 1976–77, 2024–25
  - Play-off winners: 2013

Cup

- FA Cup
  - Winners: 1910–11
- Football League Cup
  - Runners-up: 2012–13
- Third Division North Challenge Cup
  - Winners: 1938–39
- West Riding County FA Challenge Cup
  - Winners: 1906, 1907, 1908, 1909

=== Records ===
- Record league victory: 11–1 v Rotherham United, Third Division (North), 25 August 1928
- Record FA Cup victory: 11–3 v Walker Celtic, first round replay, 1 December 1937
- Record League Cup victory: 7–2 v Darlington, Second Round Second Leg, 25 September 2000
- Record league defeat: 0–8 v Manchester City, Second Division, 7 May 1927 / 1–9 v Colchester United, Fourth Division, 30 December 1961
- Record FA Cup defeat: 1–6 v Newcastle United, third round, 7 March 1963 / 0–5 v Burnley, fifth round replay, 3 February 1960 / 0–5 v Tottenham Hotspur, third round, 7 January 1970
- Record home attendance: 39,146 v Burnley, FA Cup fourth round, 11 March 1911
- Record gate receipts: £300,000 v Arsenal, Football League Cup quarter-final, 11 December 2012
- Longest unbeaten run : 21 1968 to 1969
- Longest run of wins: 10 1983 to 1984
- Most appearances : 574 Ces Podd
- Most league appearances: 502 – Ces Podd
- Most goals scored : 143 – Bobby Campbell
- Most league goals: 121 – Bobby Campbell
- Most goals in a season: 36 – David Layne, 1961–62
- Most goals scored in a match: 7 – Albert Whitehurst v Tranmere Rovers, Third Division (North), 6 March 1929
- Highest transfer fee paid: £2.5 million – David Hopkin, from Leeds United, July 2000
- Highest transfer fee received: £2 million – Des Hamilton, to Newcastle United, March 1997 / Andy O'Brien, to Newcastle United, March 2001
- Most team league goals in a season: 128 – Third Division (North), 1928–29
- Most points (three points for a win): 94 – Third Division, 1984–85
- Most points (two points for a win): 63 – Third Division (North), 1928–29

All records from Bradford City F.C. official website.

== Sponsors ==
=== Kit and main sponsors ===
Tables of kit suppliers and shirt sponsors appear below:

Period	Kit manufacturer	Shirt sponsor
1982–1983	Patrick	National Breakdown
1983–1984	Patrick	Toy City
1984–1985	Patrick	None
1985–1987	Admiral	Bradford Mythbreakers (Bradford City Council)
1987–1988	Admiral	Bradford 'Great' City (Bradford City Council)
1988–1991	Bukta	Grattan
1991–1992	Front Runner	None
1992–1993	Front Runner	Freemans
1993–1994	Admiral	Freemans
1994–1997	Beaver	Diamond Seal
1997–1999	Beaver	JCT600
1999–2001	Asics	JCT600
2001–2003	BCFC Leisure	JCT600
2003–2004	Diadora	JCT600
2004–2006	Surridge Sport	JCT600
2006–2009	Surridge Sport	Bradford & Bingley
2009–2011	Surridge Sport	Map Group (UK)
2011–2013	Nike	Map Group (UK)
2013–2016	Nike	JCT600
2016–2022	Avec Sportt	JCT600
2022–present	Macron	JCT600

=== Stadium ===
- 1995–1999 The Pulse
- 2005–2007 Bradford & Bingley
- 2007 Intersonic
- 2007–2016 Coral Windows
- 2016–2019 Northern Commercials
- 2019–2022 Utilita Energy
- 2022–2026 University of Bradford
- 2026–present Mbanq

== See also ==
- Football in Yorkshire
