= List of Bradford City A.F.C. players =

Bradford City A.F.C. is an English professional association football club based in Bradford, West Yorkshire. Bradford City been a member of the Football League since its formation in 1903. The following contains two lists; a list of all current players who have made at least one appearance in the Football League, and a list of former players who have made 50 or more appearances in the Football League for Bradford City.

== Current players ==
As of match played 21 November 2026

| Name | Nation | Years | Apps | Goals | Notes |
|---|---|---|---|---|---|
| Aden Baldwin | England | 2024– | 79 | 3 | |
| Jake Beesley | England | 2026– | 12 | 1 | |
| Henry Cartwright | England | 2026– | 4 | 0 | |
| Callum Connolly | England | 2026– | 13 | 0 | |
| Cameron Dawson | England | 2026– | 1 | 0 | |
| Macaulay Gillesphey | England | 2026– | 9 | 1 | |
| Stephen Humphrys | England | 2025– | 41 | 8 | |
| Kayden Jackson | England | 2026– | 26 | 3 | |
| George Lapslie | England | 2025– | 28 | 4 | |
| Tommy Leigh | England | 2025– | 32 | 1 | |
| Hayden Matthews | Australia | 2026– | 0 | 0 | (Note: On loan from Portsmouth) |
| Jon McCracken | Scotland | 2026– | 13 | 0 | |
| Kieran Morgan | England | 2026– | 4 | 0 | (Note: On loan from Queens Park Rangers) |
| Josh Neufville | England | 2025– | 51 | 3 | |
| Corey O'Keeffe | England | 2026– | 8 | 0 | |
| Matthew Pennington | England | 2025– | 41 | 2 | |
| Adam Phillips | England | 2026– | 13 | 0 | |
| Bobby Pointon | England | 2022– | 109 | 22 | |
| Nick Powell | England | 2025– | 24 | 3 | |
| George Pratt | England | 2026– | 10 | 1 | (Note: On loan from Blackburn Rovers) |
| Antoni Sarcevic | England | 2024– | 76 | 20 | |
| Will Swan | England | 2025– | 40 | 7 | |
| Ibou Touray | Gambia | 2025– | 56 | 0 | |
| Reece Welch | England | 2026– | 2 | 0 | |
| Tyreik Wright | Republic of Ireland | 2022–2023, 2024, 2024– | 92 | 10 | (Note: First spell on loan from Aston Villa, second spell on loan from Plymouth Argyle) |

== Former players ==
The following is a list of Bradford City players who have made 50 or more appearances in the Football League for Bradford City.

| Name | Nation | Career (Note: Career refers to years from first to last league appearance) | Apps (Note: Matches in the Football League only. Substitute appearances are included) | Goals | Notes |
|---|---|---|---|---|---|
| Greg Abbott | England | 1982–1991 | 281 | 32 | |
| Stan Alexander | England | 1931–1933 | 61 | 23 | |
| Jimmy Anders | England | 1951–1953 | 51 | 11 | |
| Peter Atherton | England | 2000–2005 | 94 | 3 | |
| Denis Atkins | England | 1968–1971 | 108 | 0 | |
| Will Atkinson | England | 2012, 2012–2013 | 54 | 2 | (Note: Initially on loan from Hull City) |
| Phil Babb | Republic of Ireland | 1990–1992 | 80 | 14 | |
| Steve Baines | England | 1978–1980 | 99 | 17 | |
| Martin Bakes | England | 1953–1959 | 72 | 7 | |
| Bruce Bannister | England | 1965–1971 | 208 | 60 | |
| Sam Barkas | England | 1928–1934 | 202 | 8 | |
| Bill Barnes | Scotland | 1958–1961 | 59 | 0 | |
| Roland Bartholomew | England | 1935–1938 | 100 | 14 | |
| Albert Bartlett | England | 1906–1909 | 52 | 18 | |
| Mick Bates | England | 1978–1980 | 56 | 1 | |
| Bobby Bauld | Scotland | 1927–1934 | 217 | 34 | |
| Peter Beagrie | England | 1997–2001 | 132 | 20 | |
| Peter Bennie | Scotland | 1924–1926 | 73 | 3 | |
| Charlie Bicknell | England | 1930–1936 | 240 | 2 | |
| John Black | Scotland | 1980, 1980–1983 | 55 | 13 | (Note: Initially on loan from Wolverhampton Wanderers) |
| Robbie Blake | England | 1997–2002 | 153 | 40 | |
| Dicky Bond | England | 1909–1922 | 301 | 60 | |
| Irvine Boocock | England | 1910–1922 | 169 | 1 | |
| Mark Bower | England | 1997–2009 | 231 | 12 | |
| Michael Boulding | England | 2008–2010 | 64 | 16 | |
| David Boyle | England | 1956–1961 | 92 | 13 | |
| Lew Bradford | England | 1946–1948 | 68 | 1 | |
| Marc Bridge-Wilkinson | England | 2005–2007 | 87 | 12 | |
| Ronnie Brown | England | 1972–1975 | 97 | 11 | |
| Walter Bruce | England | 1934–1937 | 76 | 17 | |
| Lee Bullock | England | 2008, 2008–2012 | 120 | 5 | (Note: Initially on loan from Hartlepool United) |
| Ralph Burkinshaw | England | 1925–1930 | 166 | 30 | |
| William Burnicle | England | 1933–1937 | 53 | 2 | |
| Danny Cadamarteri | England | 2002–2004, 2005–2006 | 91 | 7 | |
| Tommy Cairns | Scotland | 1927–1931 | 135 | 32 | |
| Bobby Campbell | Northern Ireland | 1979–1983, 1983–1986 | 274 | 121 | |
| Robert Campbell | Scotland | 1906–1915 | 223 | 1 | |
| Eddie Carr | England | 1949–1953 | 94 | 49 | |
| Andrew Chalmers | Scotland | 1922–1926 | 118 | 19 | |
| George Chaplin | Scotland | 1908–1919 | 88 | 0 | |
| Les Chapman | England | 1979–1982 | 139 | 3 | |
| Samuel Cheetham | England | 1921–1926 | 57 | 9 | |
| Trevor Cherry | England | 1982–1985 | 92 | 0 | (Note: Retired as a player to become manager) |
| Billy Clarke | Scotland | 1905–1908 | 92 | 15 | |
| Billy Clarke | Republic of Ireland | 2014–2017, 2019, 2020–2021 | 141 | 27 | |
| Matthew Clarke | England | 2006–2010 | 88 | 4 | |
| Sandy Cochrane | Scotland | 1929–1931 | 69 | 27 | |
| Joe Colbeck | England | 2004–2009 | 109 | 8 | |
| James Conlin | England | 1904–1906 | 61 | 5 | |
| Barry Conlon | Republic of Ireland | 2007–2009 | 72 | 17 | |
| Dick Conroy | England | 1948–1953 | 158 | 0 | |
| Andy Cook | England | 2021, 2021–2026 | 177 | 77 | (Note: First spell on loan from Mansfield Town) |
| Callum Cooke | England | 2019–2020, 2020–2022 | 101 | 5 | (Note: First spell on loan from Peterborough United) |
| Joe Cooke | Dominica | 1971–1979, 1981–1984 | 271 | 68 | |
| Ian Cooper | England | 1965–1977 | 443 | 4 | |
| Norman Corner | England | 1969–1971 | 110 | 16 | |
| Sam Cowan | England | 1935–1937 | 57 | 1 | |
| Josh Cullen | Republic of Ireland | 2016, 2016–2017 | 55 | 1 | (Note: Both spells on loan from West Ham United) |
| Malcolm Currie | Scotland | 1956–1961 | 136 | 1 | |
| Omar Daley | Jamaica | 2007–2011 | 123 | 15 | |
| Stephen Darby | England | 2012–2017 | 194 | 0 | |
| Andrew Davies | England | 2011–2012, 2012–2015 | 110 | 7 | (Note: Initially on loan from Stoke City) |
| Aidan Davison | Northern Ireland | 1999, 2000–2003 | 61 | 0 | (Note: First spell on loan from Sheffield United) |
| Jack Deakin | England | 1936–1939 | 62 | 45 | |
| Malcolm Devitt | England | 1958–1963 | 100 | 13 | |
| Timothée Dieng | France | 2016–2018 | 65 | 6 | |
| Terry Dolan | England | 1976–1981 | 195 | 43 | |
| Clayton Donaldson | Jamaica | 2019–2021 | 55 | 8 | |
| Mitchell Downie | Scotland | 1959–1963 | 134 | 0 | |
| Peter Downsborough | England | 1974–1978 | 225 | 0 | |
| Colin Doyle | Republic of Ireland | 2016–2018, 2022–2025, 2026 | 79 | 0 | |
| Eoin Doyle | Republic of Ireland | 2018–2020 | 50 | 11 | |
| Nathan Doyle | England | 2006–2007, 2012–2014 | 104 | 2 | (Note: Initially on loan from Derby County) |
| John Dreyer | England | 1996–2000 | 80 | 2 | |
| Donald Duckett | England | 1919–1924 | 155 | 6 | |
| Lee Duxbury | England | 1988–1994, 1995–1997 | 272 | 32 | |
| Mike Duxbury | England | 1991–1994 | 65 | 0 | |
| Edinho | Brazil | 1997–1999 | 59 | 15 | |
| Roy Ellam | England | 1961–1966 | 149 | 12 | |
| Mark Ellis | England | 1981–1990 | 218 | 30 | |
| Lewis Emanuel | England | 2001–2006 | 139 | 4 | |
| Dave Evans | England | 1984–1990 | 223 | 6 | |
| Gareth Evans | England | 2009–2011, 2020–2022 | 126 | 18 | |
| Paul Evans | Wales | 2002–2004, 2007–2008 | 67 | 5 | |
| Jock Ewart | Scotland | 1912–1923,1927–1928 | 283 | 0 | |
| Fred Farren | England | 1906–1912 | 87 | 0 | |
| Hugh Ferguson | Northern Ireland | 1948–1952 | 132 | 0 | |
| Bernard Fisher | England | 1963–1965 | 60 | 0 | |
| Tommy Flockett | England | 1957–1963 | 227 | 1 | |
| Michael Flynn | Wales | 2009–2012 | 91 | 10 | |
| Danny Forrest | England | 2001–2006 | 50 | 5 | |
| Jack Forrest | Scotland | 1903–1905 | 53 | 18 | |
| Oscar Fox | England | 1911–1922 | 164 | 57 | |
| Simon Francis | England | 2002–2004 | 55 | 1 | |
| David Fretwell | England | 1971–1978 | 253 | 5 | |
| Barry Gallagher | England | 1978–1983 | 71 | 22 | |
| Michael Gilhooley | Scotland | 1925–1927 | 52 | 0 | |
| John Gill | England | 1930–1933 | 86 | 0 | |
| Alex Gilliead | England | 2017, 2017–2018, 2021–2024 | 174 | 5 | (Note: First two spells both on loan from Newcastle United) |
| Allan Gilliver | England | 1972–1974,1979 | 72 | 30 | |
| Karl Goddard | England | 1987–1990 | 73 | 0 | |
| Don Goodman | England | 1983–1987 | 70 | 14 | |
| John Graham | England | 1903–1905 | 54 | 8 | |
| Andy Gray | Scotland | 2002–2004, 2013–2014 | 92 | 21 | |
| David Gray | Scotland | 1948–1956 | 242 | 13 | |
| Terry Gray | England | 1982–1984 | 69 | 15 | |
| Rodney Green | England | 1963–1964 | 66 | 39 | |
| Frank Greenhoff | England | 1948–1952 | 81 | 11 | |
| Colin Hall | England | 1970–1972 | 66 | 7 | |
| David Hall | England | 1975–1977 | 54 | 3 | |
| John Hall | England | 1962–1974 | 430 | 63 | |
| Gunnar Halle | Norway | 1999–2002 | 70 | 4 | |
| Tom Hallett | Wales | 1966–1971 | 179 | 2 | |
| Brad Halliday | England | 2022–2026 | 142 | 7 | |
| Fred Halliday | England | 1903–1907 | 72 | 0 | |
| John Hallows | England | 1930–1936 | 164 | 74 | |
| Bobby Ham | England | 1967–1971, 1973–1975 | 188 | 64 | |
| Des Hamilton | England | 1993–1997 | 88 | 5 | |
| George Handley | England | 1906–1911, 1914–1921 | 103 | 30 | |
| Harry Hanger | England | 1906–1909 | 73 | 3 | |
| James Hanson | England | 2009–2017 | 283 | 77 | |
| Peter Hardcastle | England | 1976–1978 | 62 | 1 | |
| Joe Hargreaves | England | 1912–1924 | 188 | 6 | |
| Stan Harland | England | 1961–1964 | 120 | 20 | |
| Ken Harper | England | 1946–1949 | 50 | 0 | |
| Derek Hawksworth | England | 1948–1951, 1960–1962 | 119 | 28 | |
| John Hawley | England | 1983–1985 | 67 | 28 | |
| Paul Heckingbottom | England | 2003–2004, 2007–2009 | 96 | 0 | (Note: Second spell initially on loan from Barnsley) |
| John Hendrie | Scotland | 1984–1988 | 173 | 46 | |
| George Hepplewhite | England | 1953–1954 | 57 | 2 | |
| Wayne Heseltine | England | 1992–1994 | 54 | 1 | |
| Billy Hibbert | England | 1920–1922 | 53 | 26 | |
| Sam Higginson | England | 1906–1909 | 56 | 6 | |
| George Hinsley | England | 1938–1949 | 114 | 17 | |
| Trevor Hockey | England | 1959–1962, 1974–1976 | 97 | 6 | |
| Darren Holloway | England | 2004–2006 | 57 | 1 | |
| William Howson | England | 1920–1923 | 58 | 16 | |
| Colin Hoyle | England | 1992–1994 | 64 | 1 | |
| Don Hutchins | England | 1974–1981 | 286 | 52 | |
| Richard Huxford | England | 1994–1997 | 61 | 2 | |
| Billy Ingham | England | 1980–1982 | 78 | 4 | |
| Steve Ingle | England | 1964–1967 | 90 | 15 | |
| Gerry Ingram | England | 1971–1977 | 174 | 64 | |
| David Jackson | England | 1955–1961 | 250 | 61 | |
| Peter Jackson | England | 1955–1961 | 199 | 15 | |
| Peter Allan Jackson | England | 1979–1986, 1988–1990 | 336 | 27 | |
| Wayne Jacobs | England | 1994–2005 | 318 | 12 | |
| Robbie James | Wales | 1990–1992 | 89 | 6 | |
| Alf Jefferies | England | 1935–1937 | 55 | 11 | |
| Eoin Jess | Scotland | 2000, 2001–2002 | 62 | 17 | (Note: First spell on loan from Aberdeen) |
| Paul Jewell | England | 1988–1998 | 269 | 56 | |
| Eddie Johnson | England | 2006–2008 | 64 | 7 | |
| Rod Johnson | England | 1973–1979 | 192 | 16 | |
| John Johnston | Northern Ireland | 1972–1974 | 59 | 4 | |
| Gary Jones | England | 2012–2014 | 83 | 8 | |
| Claus Bech Jørgensen | Faroe Islands | 2001–2003 | 50 | 12 | |
| Calum Kavanagh | Republic of Ireland | 2024–2026 | 61 | 14 | |
| Tom Kearney | England | 2001–2006 | 54 | 2 | |
| Brian Kelly | England | 1961–1965 | 83 | 2 | |
| Ciaran Kelly | Republic of Ireland | 2023–2026 | 77 | 1 | |
| Arnold Kendall | England | 1949–1953 | 113 | 13 | |
| Nathaniel Knight-Percival | England | 2016–2019 | 118 | 6 | |
| Billy Knott | England | 2014–2016 | 64 | 3 | |
| Nicky Law | England | 2007, 2008–2009, 2016–2018 | 121 | 9 | (Note: First two spells on loan from Sheffield United) |
| Jimmy Lawlor | Republic of Ireland | 1957–1962 | 153 | 5 | |
| Jamie Lawrence | Jamaica | 1997–2003 | 156 | 12 | |
| David Layne | England | 1960–1962 | 65 | 44 | |
| Ken Leek | Wales | 1965–1968 | 99 | 25 | |
| Tony Leighton | England | 1968–1970 | 88 | 23 | |
| Harry Lewis | England | 2022–2024 | 72 | 0 | |
| Mark Leonard | England | 1986–1992 | 157 | 29 | |
| Richard Liburd | England | 1994–1998 | 79 | 3 | |
| Gary Liddle | England | 2014–2016 | 61 | 3 | |
| Pat Liney | Scotland | 1967–1971 | 147 | 0 | |
| Evelyn Lintott | England | 1908–1912 | 53 | 2 | |
| Peter Litchfield | England | 1985–1989 | 88 | 0 | |
| Eddie Lloyd | England | 1923–1930 | 157 | 4 | |
| Peter Logan | Scotland | 1908–1925 | 271 | 37 | |
| Rory McArdle | Northern Ireland | 2012–2017 | 183 | 12 | |
| Stuart McCall | Scotland | 1982–1988, 1998–2002 | 395 | 45 | |
| Sean McCarthy | Wales | 1990–1994 | 131 | 63 | |
| John McCole | Scotland | 1958–1959, 1962–1964 | 88 | 48 | |
| Peter McConnell | England | 1969–1971 | 79 | 0 | |
| Tommy McCulloch | Scotland | 1950–1954 | 109 | 9 | |
| Charles McDermott | England | 1933–1946 | 160 | 2 | |
| Jimmy McDonald | Scotland | 1907–1919 | 202 | 25 | |
| Andy McGill | Scotland | 1947–1952 | 164 | 24 | |
| Billy McGinley | Scotland | 1975–1977 | 60 | 11 | |
| Jimmy McIlvenny | England | 1911–1922 | 132 | 26 | |
| John Mackie | Scotland | 1935–1938 | 91 | 7 | |
| Jimmy McLaren | Scotland | 1923–1927 | 155 | 0 | |
| Jon McLaughlin | Scotland | 2008–2014 | 125 | 0 | |
| Jimmy McLean | Scotland | 1904–1905, 1906–1908 | 58 | 0 | |
| Tony McMahon | England | 2015, 2015–2018 | 111 | 12 | (Note: First spell on loan from Blackpool) |
| Brendan McManus | Northern Ireland | 1948–1953 | 125 | 0 | |
| Eric McManus | Northern Ireland | 1982–1985 | 113 | 0 | |
| John McMillan | Scotland | 1903–1906 | 82 | 24 | |
| Stuart McMillan | England | 1924–1927 | 70 | 6 | |
| David McNiven | Scotland | 1978–1983 | 212 | 64 | |
| Mark Marshall | Jamaica | 2015–2017 | 73 | 6 | |
| Eugene Martinez | England | 1977–1980 | 52 | 5 | |
| Mark Mellors | England | 1909–1913 | 68 | 0 | |
| James Meredith | Australia | 2012–2017 | 182 | 4 | |
| John Middleton | England | 1972–1979 | 192 | 5 | |
| Matt Middleton | England | 1946–1948 | 94 | 0 | |
| Peter Middleton | England | 1968–1972 | 131 | 25 | |
| Jimmy Millar | Scotland | 1903–1907 | 118 | 1 | |
| Lee Mills | England | 1998–2000 | 65 | 29 | (Note: First ever £1 million signing) |
| Adam Mitchell | Scotland | 1928–1936 | 143 | 12 | |
| Brian Mitchell | Scotland | 1987–1992 | 178 | 5 | |
| Graham Mitchell | England | 1994–1996 | 65 | 1 | |
| Nicky Mohan | England | 1995–1997 | 84 | 4 | |
| Robert Molenaar | Netherlands | 2000–2003 | 77 | 2 | |
| Ron Mollatt | England | 1960–1963 | 88 | 0 | |
| Charlie Moore | England | 1926–1939 | 339 | 53 | |
| Darren Moore | Jamaica | 1997–1999 | 62 | 3 | |
| Filipe Morais | Portugal | 2014–2017 | 54 | 5 | |
| Ben Muirhead | England | 2003–2007 | 112 | 4 | |
| George Mulholland | Scotland | 1953–1960 | 277 | 0 | |
| Bill Murphy | England | 1946–1952 | 146 | 9 | |
| George Murphy | Wales | 1934–1947 | 180 | 43 | |
| Shaun Murray | England | 1994–1998 | 130 | 8 | |
| Andy Myers | England | 1999–2003 | 89 | 3 | |
| John Napier | Northern Ireland | 1972–1975, 1976–1978 | 107 | 3 | |
| Kyle Nix | England | 2007–2009 | 56 | 6 | |
| Graham Oates | England | 1970–1974 | 161 | 19 | |
| Andy O'Brien | Republic of Ireland | 1994–2001 | 133 | 3 | |
| Luke O'Brien | England | 2007–2012 | 131 | 2 | |
| Anthony O'Connor | Republic of Ireland | 2018–2021 | 122 | 8 | |
| Paudie O'Connor | Republic of Ireland | 2019, 2019–2022 | 115 | 6 | (Note: First spell on loan from Leeds United) |
| Richard O'Donnell | England | 2018–2022 | 122 | 0 | |
| Clarke Oduor | Kenya | 2023–2026 | 51 | 4 | |
| Gavin Oliver | England | 1985–1994 | 313 | 9 | |
| Luke Oliver | England | 2010, 2010–2014 | 107 | 4 | (Note: Initially on loan from Wycombe Wanderers) |
| Les O'Neill | England | 1970–1972 | 97 | 17 | |
| Jack Ormandy | England | 1932–1936 | 63 | 9 | |
| Ian Ormondroyd | England | 1985–1989, 1995–1997 | 125 | 26 | |
| Frank O'Rourke | Scotland | 1907–1914 | 192 | 88 | |
| Leigh Palin | England | 1986–1989 | 71 | 10 | |
| Wilson Parker | England | 1933–1939 | 125 | 0 | |
| Albert Partridge | England | 1929–1933 | 55 | 7 | |
| Alex Pattison | England | 2023–2026 | 50 | 10 | |
| Alf Peachey | England | 1929–1938 | 191 | 1 | |
| Harry Peel | England | 1929–1936 | 186 | 26 | |
| Nigel Pepper | England | 1997–1998 | 52 | 11 | |
| Matthew Platt | England | 2022–2024 | 75 | 2 | |
| Ces Podd | (Saint Kitts and Nevis) Saint Kitts | 1970–1984 | 502 | 4 | |
| John Poole | England | 1924–1927 | 97 | 0 | |
| Joe Poole | England | 1947–1949 | 56 | 5 | |
| Fred Potts | England | 1912–1922 | 136 | 0 | |
| Ivor Powell | Wales | 1952–1954 | 83 | 9 | |
| David Pratt | Scotland | 1921–1923 | 50 | 5 | |
| Billy Price | England | 1949–1952 | 54 | 28 | |
| Dudley Price | Wales | 1963–1965 | 62 | 21 | |
| Charlie Rackstraw | England | 1967–1969 | 104 | 27 | |
| Neil Ramsbottom | England | 1980–1983 | 73 | 0 | |
| Simon Ramsden | England | 2009–2012 | 50 | 1 | |
| Jimmy Randall | England | 1928–1930 | 57 | 15 | |
| Ricky Ravenhill | England | 2011–2012, 2012–2014 | 54 | 2 | (Note: Initially on loan from Notts County) |
| Zesh Rehman | Pakistan | 2009, 2009–2010 | 63 | 2 | (Note: Initially on loan from Queens Park Rangers) |
| John Reid | Scotland | 1957–1962 | 147 | 32 | |
| Kyel Reid | England | 2011–2014, 2015–2016 | 131 | 12 | (Note: Second spell on loan from Preston North End) |
| Paul Reid | England | 1992, 1992–1994 | 89 | 15 | (Note: Initially on loan from Leicester City) |
| Fred Rhodes | England | 1923–1926 | 52 | 14 | |
| Dean Richards | England | 1992–1995 | 86 | 4 | |
| Ted Richardson | England | 1926–1928 | 50 | 10 | |
| Donovan Ricketts | Jamaica | 2004–2008 | 108 | 0 | (Note: Initially on loan from Village United) |
| Liam Ridehalgh | England | 2021–2024 | 83 | 1 | |
| Arthur Rigby | England | 1921–1925 | 121 | 21 | |
| John Ritchie | Scotland | 1971–1974 | 64 | 0 | |
| Willie Robb | Scotland | 1954–1957 | 127 | 4 | |
| Colin Roberts | England | 1959–1961 | 57 | 0 | |
| George Robinson | England | 1903–1915 | 343 | 16 | |
| Gary Robson | England | 1993–1996 | 75 | 3 | |
| Peter Rodon | Wales | 1964–1967 | 64 | 15 | |
| Abe Rosenthal | England | 1946–1949, 1952–1954, 1955–1956 | 108 | 33 | |
| Samuel Russell | Northern Ireland | 1926–1930 | 134 | 1 | |
| Les Samuels | England | 1955–1957 | 84 | 38 | |
| Steven Schumacher | England | 2004–2007 | 117 | 13 | |
| Aubrey Scriven | England | 1927–1932 | 105 | 37 | |
| Lee Sharpe | England | 1999, 1999–2002 | 56 | 4 | (Note: Initially on loan from Leeds United) |
| Jock Shearer | Scotland | 1946–1949 | 75 | 17 | |
| Watty Shirlaw | Scotland | 1924–1927, 1928–1932 | 99 | 0 | |
| Paul Showler | England | 1993–1996 | 88 | 15 | |
| Frank Shufflebottom | England | 1946–1948 | 56 | 0 | |
| Carl Shutt | England | 1994–1997 | 88 | 15 | |
| Johnny Simm | England | 1955–1959 | 95 | 22 | |
| Martin Singleton | England | 1984–1987 | 71 | 3 | |
| Lee Sinnott | England | 1987–1991, 1993–1994, 1998 | 214 | 7 | (Note: Last spell on loan from Oldham Athletic) |
| Richie Smallwood | England | 2022–2025 | 130 | 6 | |
| Alex Smith | England | 1965–1968 | 93 | 2 | |
| Geoff Smith | England | 1954–1959 | 253 | 0 | |
| Mike Smith | England | 1961–1965 | 134 | 0 | |
| Steve Smith | England | 1978–1981 | 105 | 0 | |
| Wallace Smith | England | 1905–1909 | 112 | 54 | |
| Yann Songo'o | Cameroon | 2021–2023 | 55 | 3 | |
| Jimmy Speirs | Scotland | 1909–1912 | 86 | 29 | (Note: Captain of the 1911 FA Cup winning side) |
| Joe Spence | England | 1933–1935 | 75 | 27 | |
| Martin Spendiff | England | 1908–1912 | 54 | 0 | |
| Dave Staniforth | England | 1979–1982 | 115 | 25 | |
| Frank Stapleton | Republic of Ireland | 1991–1994 | 68 | 2 | |
| Robert Steiner | Sweden | 1997–1999 | 52 | 13 | |
| Derek Stokes | England | 1957–1960, 1966 | 126 | 55 | |
| Charlie Storer | England | 1913–1924 | 208 | 13 | |
| Stan Storton | England | 1960–1963 | 111 | 5 | |
| Bruce Stowell | England | 1960–1972 | 401 | 16 | |
| Nicky Summerbee | England | 2003–2006 | 68 | 4 | |
| Willie Summers | Scotland | 1927–1932 | 121 | 1 | |
| Levi Sutton | England | 2020–2023 | 83 | 4 | |
| Barry Swallow | England | 1967–1969 | 85 | 7 | |
| Dave Syers | England | 2010–2012 | 55 | 10 | |
| Frank Thompson | Northern Ireland | 1910–1913 | 51 | 1 | |
| Garry Thompson | England | 2012–2014 | 84 | 8 | |
| Peter Thorne | England | 2007–2010 | 77 | 31 | |
| Arthur Thorpe | England | 1963–1966 | 81 | 17 | |
| Robbie Threlfall | England | 2010, 2010–2012 | 54 | 2 | (Note: Initially on loan from Liverpool) |
| Brian Tinnion | England | 1989–1993 | 145 | 22 | |
| Neil Tolson | England | 1993–1996 | 63 | 12 | |
| Paul Tomlinson | England | 1987–1995 | 293 | 0 | |
| Steve Torpey | England | 1990–1993 | 96 | 22 | |
| Bob Torrance | Scotland | 1908–1915 | 161 | 0 | |
| Billy Tunnicliffe | England | 1953–1955 | 89 | 20 | |
| Charles Vernam | England | 2021–2022 | 50 | 10 | |
| Romain Vincelot | France | 2016–2018 | 82 | 6 | |
| Harold Walden | England | 1911–1920 | 54 | 22 | |
| Jamie Walker | Scotland | 2022, 2022–2025 | 108 | 17 | (Note: First spell on loan from Heart of Midlothian) |
| Sam Walker | England | 2024–2026 | 112 | 0 | |
| Tommy Walker | Scotland | 1924–1926 | 54 | 4 | |
| Gary Walsh | England | 1997, 1997–2003 | 133 | 0 | (Note: Initially on loan from Middlesbrough) |
| Ashley Ward | England | 2000–2003 | 84 | 19 | |
| Whelan Ward | England | 1948–1954 | 149 | 37 | |
| Sam Warhurst | England | 1934–1937 | 66 | 0 | |
| Dickie Watmough | England | 1931–1934 | 94 | 25 | |
| Billy Watson | Scotland | 1921–1930 | 330 | 1 | |
| Garry Watson | England | 1972–1983 | 263 | 28 | |
| Elliot Watt | Scotland | 2020–2022 | 87 | 5 | |
| Bobby Webb | England | 1955–1962 | 208 | 59 | |
| Barry Webster | England | 1962–1963 | 53 | 9 | |
| Nahki Wells | Bermuda | 2011–2014 | 91 | 42 | |
| David Wetherall | England | 1999–2008 | 304 | 18 | |
| Gareth Whalley | Republic of Ireland | 1998–2002 | 103 | 2 | |
| Alf Whittingham | England | 1936–1947 | 87 | 24 | |
| Jock Whyte | Scotland | 1950–1957 | 236 | 2 | |
| Ben Williams | England | 2014–2016 | 57 | 0 | |
| Gary Williams | England | 1991–1994 | 85 | 5 | |
| Steve Williams | England | 2009–2013 | 68 | 7 | |
| George Williamson | England | 1950–1957 | 223 | 31 | |
| William Wilson | England | 1903–1905 | 58 | 1 | |
| Dean Windass | England | 1999–2001, 2003–2007 | 216 | 76 | |
| Norman Winn | England | 1921–1926 | 85 | 10 | |
| Chris Withe | England | 1983–1987 | 143 | 2 | |
| Connor Wood | England | 2018–2021 | 103 | 2 | |
| Mick Wood | England | 1978–1982 | 146 | 9 | |
| Peter Wragg | England | 1963–1965 | 73 | 5 | |
| Bernie Wright | England | 1977–1978 | 66 | 13 | |
| Harry Wright | England | 1922–1927 | 68 | 4 | |
| Charlie Wyke | England | 2017–2018 | 56 | 21 | |
| Mark Yeates | Republic of Ireland | 2013–2015 | 70 | 5 | |
| Eddie Youds | England | 1995, 1995–1998 | 86 | 8 | (Note: Initially on loan from Ipswich Town) |

== Sources ==
- List of Bradford City A.F.C. players at Post War English & Scottish Football League A–Z Player's Transfer Database
- Soccerbase
- Frost, Terry (1988). Bradford City A Complete Record 1903–1988. Breedon Books Sport. ISBN 0-907969-38-0.
