= 1907–08 Bradford City A.F.C. season =

Bradford City
1907–08 season
- Manager: Peter O'Rourke
- Stadium: Valley Parade
- Football League Second Division: 1st
- FA Cup: First Round
- Top goalscorer: League: Frank O'Rourke (21); All: Frank O'Rourke (21)
- Highest home attendance: c. 27,000 (v Leeds City, 5 October 1907; v Burnley, 20 April 1908)
- Lowest home attendance: c. 8,000 (v Stockport County, 22 February 1908)

The 1907–08 season was the fifth season in Bradford City A.F.C.'s history and the fifth successive in the Second Division since their election to the league in 1903.

== Background ==
Bradford City had been elected to the Football League in 1903, since when they had played in the Second Division. They finished 10th in their first season in the league, and followed it with two further mid-table positions. Their best position in the first four seasons came in 1906–07, manager Peter O'Rourke's first full campaign having replaced Robert Campbell in November 1905. He led City to fifth position in 1906–07, helped by a record of 10 victories from their final 14 games of the campaign.

== Review ==
=== Pre-season ===
O'Rourke added to his squad which finished the previous season with a string of victories by signing Scottish national goalkeeper Willie Muir from Dundee, centre forward Sam Higginson from Reading and left half Harry Hanger from Kettering Town.

=== September ===
Bradford started the season by winning 8–1 at home against Chesterfield, the first time the club had scored more than six goals in a league game. Wally Smith's four goals in the match was also the first time any City player had managed the feat. Despite losing the second game of the season at Burnley, Bradford responded with 1–0 and 3–0 successes against Oldham Athletic and Clapton Orient.

== Match results ==
=== Legend ===
Win	Draw	Loss

=== Football League Second Division ===
Source: Frost

Game	Date	Opponent	Venue	Result	Attendance^{[A]}	Goalscorers
1	7 September 1907	Chesterfield	Home	8–1	14,000	Handley (2), McDonald, O'Rourke, Smith (4, 1 pen)
2	14 September 1907	Burnley	Away	1–2	8,000	O'Rourke
3	21 September 1907	Oldham Athletic	Home	1–0	17,000	McDonald
4	28 September 1907	Clapton Orient	Away	3–0	10,000	Bartlett, Higginson, O'Rourke
5	5 October 1907	Leeds City	Home	5–0	27,000	Bartlett, Hanger, McDonald, Smith (2, 1 pen)
6	12 October 1907	Wolverhampton Wanderers	Away	0–0	8,000	
7	19 October 1907	Gainsborough Trinity	Home	7–1	15,000	Hanger, McDonald, O'Rourke (4), Smith
8	26 October 1907	Stockport County	Away	1–1	4,000	Smith
9	2 November 1907	Glossop	Home	2–1	12,000	Bartlett, Clarke
10	9 November 1907	Leicester Fosse	Away	1–2	15,000	Handley
11	16 November 1907	Blackpool	Home	3–0	11,000	McDonald, O'Rourke, Robinson
12	23 November 1907	Stoke	Away	0–3	5,000	
13	30 November 1907	West Bromwich Albion	Home	0–0	18,000	
14	7 December 1907	Grimsby Town	Away	1–0	2,000	Handley
15	14 December 1907	Hull City	Away	2–0	9,000	Bartlett, Smith
16	21 December 1907	Derby County	Home	3–1	17,000	Bartlett, Handley (2)
17	25 December 1907	Barnsley	Home	2–0	18,000	O'Rourke (2)
18	26 December 1907	Fulham	Home	1–3	25,000	Smith (pen)
19	28 December 1907	Lincoln City	Away	4–2	2,000	Bartlett, Handley, McDonald, Smith
20	1 January 1908	Barnsley	Away	2–1	8,000	Handley (2, 1 pen)
21	4 January 1908	Chesterfield	Away	1–1	2,000	O'Rourke
22	18 January 1908	Oldham Athletic	Away	0–4	18,000	
23	25 January 1908	Clapton Orient	Home	1–0	10,000	Smith
24	1 February 1908	Leeds City	Away	1–0	25,600	McDonald
25	8 February 1908	Wolverhampton Wanderers	Home	6–2	16,000	Higginson (2), McDonald, Smith (3)
26	15 February 1908	Gainsborough Trinity	Away	5–1	4,000	Handley (3), O'Rourke (2)
27	22 February 1908	Stockport County	Home	5–0	8,000	Clarke, Handley, Higginson, McDonald, Smith
28	29 February 1908	Glossop	Away	2–2	2,000	O'Rourke (2)
29	7 March 1908	Leicester Fosse	Home	1–5	17,000	McDonald
30	14 March 1908	Blackpool	Away	1–2	3,000	McDonald
31	21 March 1908	Stoke	Home	6–0	14,000	Clarke, Handley, O'Rourke (3), Smith
32	28 March 1908	West Bromwich Albion	Away	2–3	7,000	O'Rourke, Smith
33	4 April 1908	Grimsby Town	Home	1–1	16,000	Bartlett
34	11 April 1908	Hull City	Home	2–1	16,000	Smith (2)
35	17 April 1908	Fulham	Away	2–0	40,000	Handley, O'Rourke
36	18 April 1908	Derby County	Away	3–2	14,000	Hanger, Higginson, McDermott
37	20 April 1908	Burnley	Home	2–0	27,000	Handley, McDonald
38	25 April 1908	Lincoln City	Home	2–0	12,000	McDonald, O'Rourke

=== FA Cup ===
Source:Frost

Round	Date	Opponent	Venue	Result	Attendance^{[A]}	Goalscorers
1	11 January 1908	Wolverhampton Wanderers	Home	1–1	15,100	Handley
1R	15 January 1908	Wolverhampton Wanderers	Away	0–1	16,000	

A. ^{a} ^{b} All attendances are approximate.

== League table ==
Pos	Team	Pld	W	D	L	GF	GA	GAv	Pts	Promotion or relegation
1	Bradford City	38	24	6	8	90	42	2.143	54	Division champions
2	Leicester Fosse	38	21	10	7	72	47	1.532	52	Promoted
3	Oldham Athletic (Note: New club in the league)	38	22	6	10	76	42	1.810	50	
4	Fulham	38	22	5	11	82	49	1.673	49	
5	West Bromwich Albion	38	19	9	10	61	39	1.564	47	

== Player details ==
Source: Frost

Pos.	Name	League		FA Cup		Total	
Pos.	Name	Apps	Goals	Apps	Goals	Apps	Goals
FW	Albert Bartlett	18	7	0	0	18	7
RB	Robert Campbell	30	0	1	0	31	0
OR	Willie Clarke	22	3	0	0	22	3
LB	Fred Farren	30	0	2	0	32	0
OL	George Handley	37	16	2	1	39	17
CH	Harry Hanger	34	3	2	0	36	3
CH	Sam Higginson	35	5	2	0	37	5
CH	Gerald Kirk	3	0	0	0	3	0
GK	Herbert Kneeshaw	1	0	0	0	1	0
IF	Tommy McDermott	4	1	0	0	4	1
FW	Jimmy McDonald	36	13	2	0	38	13
DF	Jimmy McLean	14	0	1	0	15	0
DF	David Melville	2	0	0	0	2	0
HB	Jimmy Millar	3	0	0	0	3	0
GK	Willie Muir	28	0	2	0	30	0
CF	Frank O'Rourke	36	21	2	0	38	21
FB	James Roberts	2	0	0	0	2	0
HB	George Robinson	37	1	2	0	39	1
FW	Wally Smith	34	20	2	0	36	20
GK	Martin Spendiff	5	0	0	0	5	0
FW	James Vallance	3	0	2	0	5	0
GK	Albert Wise	4	0	0	0	4	0

== See also ==
- 1907–08 in English football
