= 1903–04 Bradford City A.F.C. season =

Bradford City
1903–04 season
- Chairman: Alfred Ayrton
- Manager: Robert Campbell
- Stadium: Valley Parade
- Football League Second Division: 10th
- FA Cup: Fourth Qualifying Round
- Top goalscorer: League: Johnny McMillan (14); All: Johnny McMillan (16)
- Highest home attendance: c. 16,000 (v Bristol City, 19 September 1903)
- Lowest home attendance: c. 3,000 (v Leicester Fosse, 19 December 1903)
Home colours	early games colours

The 1903–04 season was the first season in Bradford City A.F.C.'s history, having been founded on 29 May 1903 and then elected into the English Football League to replace Doncaster Rovers in the Second Division. They finished in 10th position in the league and reached the fourth qualifying round of the FA Cup.

Bradford City were formed following a series of meetings during the first half of 1903 and replaced the former rugby league club of Manningham, whose Valley Parade ground they used. The club had already signed six players before they were accepted into the league before the rest of the side were later signed by a five-man committee. The board directors appointed Robert Campbell as the club's first manager. Bradford City's first game ended in a 2–0 defeat at Grimsby Town and the first home game resulted in another loss to Gainsborough Trinity. Club captain Johnny McMillan finished the top goalscorer with 14 league and two FA Cup goals.

== Background ==
Organised league football had been played in the West Riding of Yorkshire since 1894 in the West Yorkshire League, but no side from the county had played in the English Football League. So on 30 January 1903, Scotsman James Whyte, a sub-editor of the Bradford Observer, met with Football Association representative John Brunt at Valley Parade, the home of the city's rugby league side Manningham Football Club, to discuss establishing a Football League club within Bradford. In May, Manningham's committee decided to swap codes from rugby to association football and so the Football League decided to invite Bradford City to join their league in a bid to introduce association football to the West Riding, the main sport in which was rugby league. The League voted in favour of replacing Doncaster Rovers, who had finished the 1902–03 season in 16th position in the Second Division, with Bradford City even though Bradford had yet to play a single game.

== Review ==
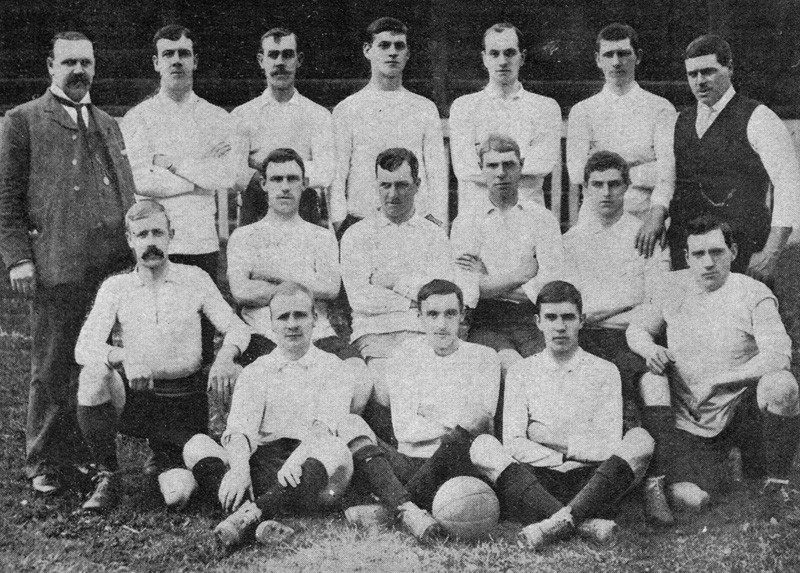
Bradford City's first squad. Back row: Campbell (manager), Wilson, Bright, Seymour, Halliday, Robinson, Cutts (trainer). Middle row: Guy, Millar, McMillan, Farnall, Carter, O'Rourke. Front row: Beckram, Forrest, Prosser.

=== Pre-season ===
Even before Bradford City were guaranteed a place in the Football League, the club made its first acquisitions by signing Jack Forrest and Ben Prosser from Stoke on 1 May. These were followed by four more players joining the club; Sam Bright, George Robinson, Peter O'Rourke and Jimmy Millar. Despite not having enough players to field a full side, four club representatives travelled to London by the end of May for a league management committee meeting, when the club was elected into the Second Division. Money was raised to fund the club, including at least £2,000 from sponsors, a balance of £500 from Manningham FC and proceeds from a summer archery tournament. Bradford City also took over Manningham's Valley Parade ground for their home fixtures.

The four-strong party which visited London, as well as newly elected Alfred Ayrton made up five members of a 13-man sub-committee which controlled club affairs. The first five, who also included J. Brunt, J.E. Fattorini, A.J. Foxcroft and J.T. Whyte, were responsible for first team matters. On 20 June, the club directors appointed former Sunderland secretary-manager Robert Campbell as Bradford City's first manager from a shortlist of 30 applicants. Campbell's role was to coach the players, helped by trainer George Cutts. Ayrton, who had been president of Manningham FC, became the club's first chairman.

Bradford played no recorded pre-season friendlies. Instead, Campbell and Cutts, decided on the first selection for the opening game of the season with Grimsby Town by playing a series of Whites v Stripes games between professionals already signed by the club and amateur players. The first squad was signed at a cost of £917 10s 0d, with the players choosing Johnny McMillan as their own captain. Millar, a defender signed from Middlesbrough, was chosen as vice-captain.

=== September ===
Bradford City's first league game was at Blundell Park against Grimsby Town on 1 September 1903, on a sunny Tuesday evening in front of 10,000 fans. The pioneering team consisted of Arthur Seymour in goal, defenders Willie Wilson, Fred Halliday, George Robinson, Jimmy Millar and Thomas Farnall with Richard Guy, John Beckram, Jack Forrest, Johnny McMillan and John Graham in attack. Graham, Beckram and Guy all came close to giving City an opening day lead, but Grimsby scored through Archie Dunn. After City were reduced to ten men because of an injury to Guy, Fred Rouse doubled Grimsby's lead in the second half; Grimsby finished the victors 2–0. Four days later, City hosted their first home at Valley Parade against Gainsborough Trinity. The game attracted 11,000 spectators even though there was no covered accommodation for fans. Among the spectators was Bradford's Lord Mayor and Lady Mayoress. City lost 3–1 with Guy scoring the club's first ever league goal, but they also had a goal disallowed and missed a penalty. The Bradford Daily Argus reported that the goal was "greeted with a shout which awoke babies on the distant hillsides of Bolton and Eccleshill. The match highlights were shown in Bradford's St George's Hall later in the same evening.

Bradford won their first game in the league in their third game of the season, with a 2–0 victory against Burton United at Peel Croft. A week later, they won their first game at their Valley Parade home by defeating Bristol City 1–0. McMillan scored in each game, with Forrest also scoring against Burton. They finished the month with a 3–1 loss at Manchester United.

=== October ===
Bradford played only two league games during October. The first ended in a 5–2 defeat to Burslem Port Vale; the second – on 24 October – finished in a 3–1 victory to Bradford against fellow Yorkshire side Barnsley. Instead, City played their first games in the FA Cup in the club's history. The first qualifying round match and the club's debut in the competition was a 6–1 victory against Rockingham Colliery with six different City players on the scoresheet. City progressed through the following two qualifying rounds against Mirfield United and Worksop Town, with all three games being held at Valley Parade.

During October, City also hosted an inter-league game between the English and Irish Leagues at Valley Parade. Although the ground was not up to high standards, the Football League was keen to encourage football in Bradford. An estimated 20,000 supporters attended the match which finished with a 2–1 victory for the Football League. The club also made their first signing since the start of the season, bringing in forward Thomas Drain from Scottish side Maybole.

=== November and December ===
City went another two weeks before playing again when their FA Cup run came to an end with a 2–1 defeat at their fellow Second Division side Chesterfield in the fourth qualifying round. They returned to league action on 21 November against Bolton Wanderers, nearly a month since their win against Barnsley. Drain, who had scored on his debut against Barnsley, scored Bradford's first ever hat-trick, but the game finished in a 3–3 draw. A week later, Drain scored for the third successive league match but City lost 3–2 to Burnley.

Bradford played six games during December, with the first two ending in draws against Preston North End and Stockport County. On 19 December, City defeated Leicester Fosse 4–0 at Valley Parade. It was City's highest league victory of the season with McMillan scoring his side's second hat-trick of the campaign. City finished the month with three games in the space of four days. They first lost 4–1 to Woolwich Arsenal on Christmas Day, before a 1–0 victory at Blackpool. The year finished with a draw against Port Vale.

=== January, February and March ===
At the turn of the new year, City were defeated by Gainsborough Trinity, before they completed their first double by defeating Burton United 3–0. Two draws followed – against Bristol City and Manchester United. City extended their unbeaten run by winning all three matches during February, with victories against Glossop, Barnsley and Lincoln City. Each victory finished 2–1 with Beckram, Drain and Robinson all scoring twice during the month. The club's six-game unbeaten run came to an end in the return fixture at Glossop, with further defeats following against Stockport County and Chesterfield. The three-game losing streak was overturned with a 3–0 win over Burnley; Graham scored twice to become the third player to score more than one goal during a league game.

=== April ===
City packed in eight games during April to complete the league season. On 1 April, they lost to Lincoln City and then the following day they lost to Preston North End. A third game in four days finished in a 1–1 draw with Chesterfield. The first victory of the month came in the reverse fixture against the club's first ever league opponents Grimsby Town. City lost 1–0 to Bolton Wanderers before a 2–1 victory followed against Leicester Fosse, with McMillan scoring one of the goals. The final two matches both ended in defeats without City scoring; first to Arsenal, then to Blackpool. City finished 10th at the end of the first season recording 31 points from 34 games.

Team captain McMillan finished as the club's top scorer with 14 goals. He played 32 games, with goalkeeper Seymour, half-back Robinson and forward Graham all being ever-presents. With the advent of league football in Bradford, thousands of people came to home games, resulting in the club's end-of-season receipts totalling £3,896. It resulted in a small operating loss from the first season, but donations helped the club record a profit of £39 in their first season in the Football League. Following the end of the season, the club released six players and also sold Guy to Leeds City.

== Match results ==
=== Legend ===
Win	Draw	Loss

=== Football League Second Division ===
Source: Frost

Game	Date	Opponent	Venue	Result	Attendance^{[A]}	Goalscorers
1	1 September 1903	Grimsby Town	Away	0–2	10,000	
2	5 September 1903	Gainsborough Trinity	Home	1–3	11,000	Guy
3	12 September 1903	Burton United	Away	2–0	3,000	Forrest, McMillan
4	19 September 1903	Bristol City	Home	1–0	16,000	McMillan
5	26 September 1903	Manchester United	Away	1–3	30,000	McMillan
6	10 October 1903	Burslem Port Vale	Away	2–5	^{[B]}	Graham, Prosser
7	24 October 1903	Barnsley	Home	3–1	12,000	Drain, Graham, McMillan
8	21 November 1903	Bolton Wanderers	Home	3–3	7,000	Drain (3)
9	28 November 1903	Burnley	Away	2–3	1,000	Drain, McMillan
10	5 December 1903	Preston North End	Home	1–1	13,000	McMillan
11	12 December 1903	Stockport County	Home	0–0	6,000	
12	19 December 1903	Leicester Fosse	Home	4–0	3,000	McMillan (3), own goal
13	25 December 1903	Woolwich Arsenal	Away	1–4	20,000	McMillan
14	26 December 1903	Blackpool	Away	1–0	^{[B]}	Forrest
15	28 December 1903	Burslem Port Vale	Home	1–1	13,000	McMillan
16	2 January 1904	Gainsborough Trinity	Away	0–3	3,000	
17	9 January 1904	Burton United	Home	3–0	12,000	Drain, Forrest, McMillan
18	16 January 1904	Bristol City	Away	1–1	7,000	Farnall
19	23 January 1904	Manchester United	Home	3–3	12,000	Beckram, Forrest, O'Rourke
20	6 February 1904	Glossop	Home	2–1	5,000	Beckram, Robinson
21	20 February 1904	Barnsley	Away	2–1	5,000	Beckram, Drain
22	27 February 1904	Lincoln City	Home	2–1	7,000	Drain, Robinson
23	1 March 1904	Glossop	Away	0–2	^{[B]}	
24	5 March 1904	Stockport County	Away	0–2	4,000	
25	12 March 1904	Chesterfield	Home	2–6	10,000	Drain, Forrest
26	26 March 1904	Burnley	Home	3–0	10,000	Beckram, Graham (2)
27	1 April 1904	Lincoln City	Away	0–1	^{[B]}	
28	2 April 1904	Preston North End	Away	0–4	5,000	
29	4 April 1904	Chesterfield	Away	1–1	3,000	Graham
30	9 April 1904	Grimsby Town	Home	1–0	10,000	McMillan
31	11 April 1904	Bolton Wanderers	Away	0–1	10,000	
32	16 April 1904	Leicester Fosse	Away	2–1	4,000	Graham, McMillan
33	19 April 1904	Woolwich Arsenal	Home	0–3	15,000	
34	23 April 1904	Blackpool	Home	0–2	7,000	

=== FA Cup ===
Source:Frost

Round	Date	Opponent	Venue	Result	Attendance^{[A]}	Goalscorers
1Q	3 October 1903	Rockingham Colliery	Home	6–1	8,000	Forrest, Graham, Guy, McMillan, Prosser, Robinson (pen)
2Q	17 October 1903	Mirfield United	Home	3–1	5,000	McMillan, Prosser (2)
3Q	31 October 1903	Worksop Town	Home	5–0	5,000	Beckram (2), Farnall, Forrest, Prosser
4Q	14 November 1903	Chesterfield	Away	1–2	6,000	Drain

A. ^{a} ^{b} All attendances are approximate.
B. ^{a} ^{b} ^{c} ^{d} Attendance is unknown.

== League table ==
Pos	Team	Pld	W	D	L	GF	GA	GAv	Pts
8	Barnsley	34	11	10	13	38	57	0.667	32
9	Gainsborough Trinity	34	14	3	17	53	60	0.883	31
10	Bradford City (Note: New club in the league)	34	12	7	15	45	59	0.763	31
11	Chesterfield Town	34	11	8	15	37	45	0.822	30
12	Lincoln City	34	11	8	15	41	58	0.707	30

== Player details ==
Source: Frost

Pos.	Name	League		FA Cup		Total	
Pos.	Name	Apps	Goals	Apps	Goals	Apps	Goals
FW	John Beckram	23	4	1	2	24	6
DF	Sam Bright	6	0	0	0	6	0
FB	Tony Carter	7	0	4	0	11	0
CF	Thomas Drain	22	9	1	1	23	10
HB	Thomas Farnall	25	1	1	1	27	2
CF	Jack Forrest	27	5	3	2	30	7
FW	John Graham	34	6	4	1	38	7
OR	Richard Guy	6	1	3	1	9	2
FB	Fred Halliday	23	0	1	0	24	0
OR	John Harper	2	0	0	0	2	0
DF	Jimmy McLean	1	0	0	0	1	0
IL	Johnny McMillan	32	14	4	2	36	16
HB	Jimmy Millar	24	0	4	0	28	0
FW	Everitt Moore	3	0	0	0	3	0
OR	John Murphy	1	0	0	0	1	0
CH	Peter O'Rourke	25	1	4	0	29	1
IR	Ben Prosser	15	1	4	4	19	5
HB	George Robinson	34	2	3	1	37	3
GK	Arthur Seymour	34	0	4	0	38	0
RB	Willie Wilson	30	0	3	0	33	0

== Transfers ==
Source: Frost

=== In ===
Date	Pos	Name	From	Fee
May 1903	CF	Jack Forrest	Stoke	
May 1903	IL	Johnny McMillan	Small Heath	
May 1903	IR	Ben Prosser	Stoke	
June 1903	OR	Richard Guy	Manchester City	
June 1903	FB	Fred Halliday	Bolton Wanderers	
June 1903	HB	Jimmy Millar	Middlesbrough	
June 1903	FW	Everitt Moore	Rawdon	
June 1903	HB	George Robinson	Nottingham Forest	
July 1903	FW	John Beckram	Sheffield United	
July 1903	DF	Sam Bright	Sheffield United	
July 1903	FB	Tony Carter	Sunderland	
July 1903	HB	Thomas Farnall	Watford	
July 1903	GK	Arthur Seymour	Barnsley	
August 1903	FW	John Graham	Newcastle United	
August 1903	CH	Peter O'Rourke	Chesterfield	
August 1903	RB	Willie Wilson	Newcastle United	
October 1903	CF	Thomas Drain	Maybole	
January 1904	OR	John Harper	Maybole	
January 1904	OR	John Murphy	Stoke	
April 1904	DF	Jimmy McLean	Clachnacuddin	

=== Out ===
Date	Pos	Name	From	Fee
May 1904	OR	Richard Guy	Leeds City	
1904	DF	Sam Bright	Released	
1904	OR	John Harper	Released	
1904	FW	Everitt Moore	Released	
1904	OR	John Murphy	Released	
1904	IR	Ben Prosser	Released	
1904	GK	Arthur Seymour	Released	

== See also ==
- 1903–04 in English football
