= Jack Wilkie =

Jack Wilkie may refer to:

- Jack Wilkie (footballer, born 1876) (1876–?), Scottish footballer
- Jack Wilkie (footballer, born 2003), Scottish footballer

== See also ==
- Jack Wilkie-Jans, Australian Aboriginal affairs advocate
- John Wilkie (disambiguation)
