= Drain =

Drain may refer to:

== Objects and processes ==
- Drain (plumbing), a fixture that provides an exit-point for waste water or for water that is to be re-circulated on the side of a road
  - Floor drain
- Drain (surgery), a tube used to remove pus or other fluids from a wound
- Drainage, the natural or artificial removal of surface and sub-surface water from a given area
  - French drain, a system that redirects surface water and groundwater away from an area
  - Slot drain
  - Storm drain, a system of collecting and disposing of rain water in an urban area
- Drain (transistor), a terminal in a field effect transistor

== Entertainment ==
=== Music ===
- Drain (noise rock band), an American noise rock band
- Drain (punk band), an American hardcore punk band
- Drain STH, a Swedish hard rock band
- Drain Gang, Swedish hip hop collective
- "Drain", song by X Japan on the album Dahlia
- "The Drain", song by Bad Omens, Health, and Swarm on the albums Concrete Jungle [The OST] and Rat Wars Ultra Edition

=== Other ===
- Drain (comics), a comic book series starring a vampire

== Places ==
- Drain, Oregon, a city in Douglas County, Oregon, United States
- Drain, Maine-et-Loire, a commune in France
- Waterloo & City line, in the London Underground, nicknamed "The Drain"

== People with the surname ==
- Charles Drain (disambiguation), several people
- Dorothy Drain (1909–1996), Australian journalist, columnist, war correspondent, editor and poet
- Émile Drain (1890–1966), French actor and comedian
- Geoffrey Drain (1918–1993), British trade union leader
- Gershwin A. Drain (born 1949), American federal judge
- Jim Drain (born 1975), American artist
- Job Henry Charles Drain (1895–1975), English recipient of the Victoria Cross
- Lauren Drain (born 1985), American author
- Robert D. Drain (born c. 1957), American judge
- Sammy Drain (1945–2016), guitarist
- Thomas Drain (1879–1952), Scottish footballer
- Tracy Drain, flight systems engineer at NASA
- William Thomas Drain (1905–1984), Scottish Australian footballer
