= Jimmy Millar (footballer, born 1876) =

Scottish footballer (1876–1932)

Personal information
- Full name: James Alexander Millar
- Date of birth: 4 May 1876
- Place of birth: Elgin, Scotland
- Date of death: January 1932 (aged 55)
- Place of death: Michigan, United States
- Height: 5 ft 9 in (1.75 m)
- Position: Half back

Senior career*
Years	Team	Apps	(Gls)
- Elgin City
1898–1900	Rangers	5	(0)
1899–1900	→ Port Glasgow Athletic (loan)	13	(3)
1900–1903	Middlesbrough	20	(0)
1903–1907	Bradford City	118	(1)
1909–1912	Aberdeen	77	(2)
- * Club domestic league appearances and goals

James Millar (4 May 1876 – January 1932) was a Scottish professional footballer who played as a half back.

== Career ==
Millar spent his early career with Elgin City, Rangers, Port Glasgow Athletic and Middlesbrough. At Rangers he played as an "attacking wing half" and won the Scottish Football League title in his one full season, 1898–99, playing in the final five of the 18 fixtures – all of which Rangers won. For Middlesbrough, he made 20 appearances in the Football League; he also made 3 FA Cup appearances.

He joined Bradford City in June 1903, becoming one of the club's first professional players. He was a "popular figure" and was elected by his teammates to serve as vice-captain to both Johnny McMillan and Fred Halliday. He played in City's first ever Football League match on 1 September 1903, against Grimsby Town, playing as centre-half in that game. He spent most of his time with City playing as a half back. He retired due to injury in 1907, having made 118 league and 11 FA Cup appearances. In 1909, Bradford City gave him a benefit match (shared with George Robinson). That same year he returned to football, playing with Aberdeen until 1912.

Millar later worked as a sheep farmer in Australia, before dying in Michigan in January 1932, aged 55. Millar was also a "fine landscape painter".

== Career statistics ==
Club	Seasons	League			National Cup		Total	
Club	Seasons	Division	Apps	Goals	Apps	Goals	Apps	Goals
Rangers	1898-99	Scottish Division One	5	0	0	0	5	0
Rangers	1899-00	Scottish Division One	0	0	0	0	0	0
Rangers	Total		5	0	0	0	5	0
Port Glasgow Athletic (loan)	1899-00	Scottish Division Two	13	3	-	-	13+	3+
Middlesbrough	1900-01	Second Division	19	0	3	0	22	0
Middlesbrough	1901-02	Second Division	0	0	0	0	0	0
Middlesbrough	1902-03	First Division	1	0	0	0	1	0
Middlesbrough	Total		20	0	3	0	23	0
Bradford City	1903-04	Second Division	24	0	4	0	28	0
Bradford City	1904-05	Second Division	-	-	-	-	-	-
Bradford City	1905-06	Second Division	-	-	-	-	-	-
Bradford City	1906-07	Second Division	-	-	-	-	-	-
Bradford City	Total		-	-	-	-	118	1
Aberdeen	1909-10	Scottish Division One	34	1	3	0	37	1
Aberdeen	1910-11	Scottish Division One	30	1	4	0	34	1
Aberdeen	1911-12	Scottish Division One	13	0	0	0	13	0
Aberdeen	Total		77	2	7	0	84	2
Career total			115+	2+	10+	0+	243+	6+

== Sources ==
- Frost, Terry (1988). Bradford City A Complete Record 1903-1988. Breedon Books Sport. ISBN 0-907969-38-0.
