= 1901–02 Rangers F.C. season =

Rangers
1901–02 season
- Chairman: James Henderson
- Manager: William Wilton
- Ground: Ibrox Park
- Scottish League Division One: 1st P18 W13 D2 L3 F43 A29 Pts28
- Scottish Cup: Semi-finals
- Top goalscorer: League: Robert Hamilton (9); All: Robert Hamilton (11)

The 1901–02 season was the 28th season of competitive football by Rangers.

== Overview ==
Rangers played a total of 22 competitive matches during the 1901–02 season. The club successfully defended the league championship, finishing two points ahead of Celtic. In 18 league matches, the team registered 13 wins.

Their Scottish Cup campaign came to an end in the semi-final at the hands of Hibernian after a 2–0 home defeat.

== Results ==
All results are written with Rangers' score first.

=== Scottish League Division One ===
Date	Opponent	Venue	Result	Attendance	Scorers
17 August 1901	Kilmarnock	A	2–4	6,000	Hamilton, McDougal
24 August 1901	Heart of Midlothian	H	2–1	17,000	Speedie, Hamilton
31 August 1901	Dundee	A	3–0	12,000	McDougal (2), Speedie
7 September 1901	Kilmarnock	H	3–2	16,000	Campbell, A.Smith, Gibson
16 September 1901	Heart of Midlothian	A	2–0		Neil, Hamilton
21 September 1901	St. Mirren	A	5–1	10,000	Campbell (2), A.Smith, Wilkie, Jackson (og)
23 September 1901	Hibernian	H	0–2	10,000	
28 September 1901	Third Lanark	A	2–2	16,000	A.Smith, Hamilton
5 October 1901	Celtic	H	3–2	30,000	Neil, Speedie, Quinn (og)
19 October 1901	Hibernian	A	3–2	12,000	Wilkie, Hamilton (pen), Neil
2 November 1901	Queen's Park	H	2–1	12,000	McPherson, Hamilton
9 November 1901	Grenock Morton	A	3–2	7,000	McPherson (2), Wilkie
16 November 1901	Third Lanark	H	1–4	5,000	Robertson
7 December 1901	Greenock Morton	H	2–1	3,000	A.Smith, Hamilton
1 January 1902	Celtic	A	4–2	40,000	N.Smith, Campbell, Robertson, Hamilton
4 January 1902	Queen's Park	A	1–0	20,000	Robertson
18 January 1902	St. Mirren	H	3–2	12,000	Speedie (2), Cameron (og)
29 January 1902	Dundee	H	3–1	13,000	Hamilton, A.Smith, Speedie

=== Scottish Cup ===
Date	Round	Opponent	Venue	Result	Attendance	Scorers
11 January 1902	R1	Johnstone	H	6–1	2,000	Howie (og), Speedie, A.Smith, Hamilton, Robertson, Graham
25 January 1902	R2	Caledonian	H	5–1	5,000	A.Smith (2), Wilkie, Campbell, Hamilton
22 February 1902	QF	Kilmarnock	H	2–0	10,000	Speedie, A.Smith
22 March 1902	SF	Hibernian	H	0–2	40,000	

== Appearances ==
Player	Position	Appearances	Goals
(Scotland) Alex Smith	FW	22	9
(Scotland) Robert Neil	DF	17	3
(Scotland) Robert Hamilton	FW	20	11
(Scotland) Finlay Speedie	FW	20	8
(Scotland) James Stark	DF	19	0
(Scotland) Matthew Dickie	GK	19	0
(Scotland) Nicol Smith	DF	19	1
(Scotland) Jack Wilkie	MF	16	4
(Scotland) Neilly Gibson	MF	17	1
(Scotland) Jock Drummond	DF	15	0
(Scotland) John Campbell	MF	15	5
(Scotland) John Tait Robertson	DF	12	4
(Scotland) David Crawford	DF	9	0
(Scotland) John McPherson	MF	6	3
(Scotland) Lee McDougall	FW	4	3
(Scotland) James Graham	MF	4	1
(Scotland) Noble McPherson	GK	2	0
(Scotland) Hugh Morton	MF	3	0
(Scotland) David Goudie	MF	1	0
(Scotland) George Young	DF	1	0
(Scotland) James R. Hamilton	FW	1	0

== See also ==
- 1901–02 in Scottish football
- 1901–02 Scottish Cup
