= Bob Wilkie =

Bob or Robert Wilkie may refer to:

- Robert Wilkie (moderator) (1548–1611), moderator of the General Assembly of the Church of Scotland in 1600 and principal of St Andrews University, 1591–1611
- Bob Wilkie (footballer) (1920–2001), Australian rules footballer
- Bob Wilkie (ice hockey) (born 1969), Canadian ice hockey player
- Robert Wilkie (born 1962), American lawyer and government official
- Robert Wilkie (cricketer) (1878–1966), New Zealand cricketer
- Robert J. Wilke (1914–1989), American actor
