= 1898–99 Rangers F.C. season =

Rangers
1898–99 season
- President: James Henderson
- Match Secretary: William Wilton
- Ground: Ibrox Park
- Scottish League Division One: Winners
- Scottish Cup: Runners-up
- Top goalscorer: League: Robert Hamilton (21); All: Robert Hamilton (25)

The 1898–99 season was the 25th season of competitive football by Rangers.

== Overview ==
Rangers played a total of 39 competitive matches during the 1898–99 season. They finished top of Scottish League Division One with a one hundred percent record of 18 wins from 18 matches.

The club ended the season without any other trophies: in the Scottish Cup, despite beating Hearts and St Mirren en route to the final, they lost to Celtic 2–0. Earlier in the season they had also lost in the final of the less important Glasgow Cup 1–0 to Queen's Park, and at its end they lost in the minor Glasgow Merchants Charity Cup final, another 2–0 loss to Celtic, also finishing as runners-up to the same opponents in the supplementary Glasgow Football League.

Regardless of these setbacks, the perfect league campaign of 1898–99 remains a unique achievement in the annals of British football.

== Results ==
All results are written with Rangers' score first.

=== Scottish League Division One ===
Date	Opponent	Venue	Result	Attendance	Scorers
20 August 1898	Partick Thistle	H	6–2	7,000	Hamilton (3), Sharp, Neil, Millar
27 August 1898	St Mirren	A	3–1		A.Smith, Hamilton, McPherson
3 September 1898	Heart of Midlothian	A	3–2	17,500	Hamilton (2), Wilkie
10 September 1898	Third Lanark	H	4–1	18,000	Millar, McPherson, Campbell, Neil (pen.)
19 September 1898	St Bernard's	A	2–0	8,000	A.Smith, Neil (pen.)
24 September 1898	Celtic	A	4–0	45,000	Neil (pen.), McPherson, Campbell, Millar
26 September 1898	Third Lanark	A	3–2	14,000	Campbell (2), McPherson
1 October 1898	Heart of Midlothian	H	3–1	25,000	Hamilton (2), A.Smith
8 October 1898	Dundee	A	2–1	7,500	Hamilton, Wilkie
5 November 1898	Partick Thistle	A	5–0	5,000	Hamilton (2), Millar (2), Sharp
19 November 1898	Hibernian	A	4–3	10,000	Millar, A.Smith, Hamilton, Neil (pen.)
26 November 1898	Clyde	H	8–0	4,000	Millar (3), Sharp (2), Gibson (2), Watson (o.g.)
3 December 1898	St Bernard's	H	5–2	3,000	Campbell (4), Hamilton
17 December 1898	Dundee	H	9–0	3,000	Hamilton (3), A.Smith (2), McPherson (2), Gibson (pen.), Campbell
24 December 1898	Hibernian	H	10–0	7,000	A.Smith (4), Hamilton (2), McPherson, Millar, Gibson (pen.), Campbell
31 December 1898	St Mirren	H	3–2	5,000	Campbell (2), A.Smith
2 January 1899	Celtic	H	4–1	30,000	Hamilton (3), Campbell
7 January 1899	Clyde	A	3–0	4,000	A.Smith, Millar, Neil (pen.)

=== Scottish Cup ===
Date	Round	Opponent	Venue	Result	Attendance	Scorers
14 January 1899	R1	Heart of Midlothian	H	4–1	25,612	Gibson (2), Neil (pen.), Hamilton
11 February 1899	R2	Ayr Parkhouse	A	4–1	5,000	Hamilton (2), Campbell, A.Smith
18 February 1899	QF	Clyde	H	4–0	6,000	Low, McPherson, Gibson (pen.), Hamilton
15 April 1899	SF	St Mirren	A	2–1	10,000	McPherson, Millar
22 April 1899	F	Celtic	N	0–2	25,000	

== Appearances ==
Player	Position	Appearances	Goals
(Scotland) Matthew Dickie	GK	23	0
(Scotland) Robert Hamilton	FW	23	25
(Scotland) Robert Neil	DF	22	7
(Scotland) Alex Smith	FW	22	13
(Scotland) David Crawford	DF	22	0
(Scotland) Neilly Gibson	MF	22	6
(Scotland) John Campbell	MF	21	13
(Scotland) Jimmy Millar	FW	21	12
(Scotland) John McPherson	MF	20	8
(Scotland) David Mitchell	MF	18	0
(Scotland) Nicol Smith	DF	17	0
(Scotland) Jock Drummond	DF	6	0
(Scotland) Jimmy E. Millar	DF	5	0
(Scotland) Andrew Sharp	MF	4	3
(Scotland) Jack Wilkie	FW	4	2
(Scotland) James Sharp	MF	1	1
(Scotland) Tommy Low	MF	1	1
(Scotland) Jimmy Oswald	FW	1	0

== League table ==
Pos	Team	Pld	W	D	L	GF	GA	GD	Pts	Qualification or relegation
1	Rangers (C)	18	18	0	0	79	18	+61	36	Champions
2	Heart of Midlothian	18	12	2	4	56	30	+26	26	
3	Celtic	18	11	2	5	51	33	+18	24	
4	Hibernian	18	10	3	5	42	43	−1	23	
5	St Mirren	18	8	4	6	46	32	+14	20	
6	Third Lanark	18	7	3	8	33	38	−5	17	
7	Clyde	18	4	4	10	23	48	−25	12	
7	St Bernard's	18	4	4	10	30	37	−7	12	
9	Partick Thistle (R)	18	2	2	14	19	58	−39	6	Relegated to the 1899–1900 Scottish Division Two
10	Dundee	18	1	2	15	23	65	−42	4	

Source: statto.com
Rules for classification: Teams finish equal if level on points. Points system: 2 points for a win, 1 point for a draw, 0 points for a loss
(C) Champions; (R) Relegated

== See also ==
- 1898–99 in Scottish football
- 1898–99 Scottish Cup
- List of unbeaten football club seasons
- Perfect season
