= James Vallance =

James Vallance is the name of:

- Jim Vallance (born 1952), Canadian musician
- Jimmy Vallance, Scottish footballer
