= William Robb =

William or Willie Robb may refer to:

- Bill Robb (1927–2012), Australian politician
- William Robb (footballer, born 1895) (1895–1976), Scottish footballer
- William Robb (footballer, born 1927) (1927–2002), Scottish footballer
- William Robb (British Army officer), British Army officer
