= John Wilkie (disambiguation) =

John Wilkie (1860–1934) was an American journalist and Chief of the United States Secret Service.

John Wilkie may also refer to:

- John Wilkie (canoeist) (born 1977), Australian canoeist
- John Wilkie (footballer) (1947–2023), Scottish footballer
- John Wilkie (cricketer) (1877–1963), New Zealand cricketer

== See also ==
- Jack Wilkie (footballer, born 1876) (fl. 1890s), Scottish footballer with Partick Thistle, Rangers, Blackburn Rovers
- John Wilke (1954–2009), American investigative reporter
- John C. Willke (1925–2015), American medical doctor, author, and anti-abortion activist
