= Alfred Jefferies =

Alfred Jefferies may refer to:

- Alf Jeffries (footballer, born 1914), English professional footballer for Norwich City, Bradford City and Derby County
- Alf Jefferies (footballer, born 1922), English professional footballer for Brentford and Torquay United
- Alf Jefferies (darts player) from Denmark Open (darts)
