= Draining =

Draining may refer to:

- Drainage, the natural or artificial process of water removal from land
- the urban exploration of sewers and storm drains

== See also ==
- Drain (disambiguation)
