= Albert Wise =

English footballer

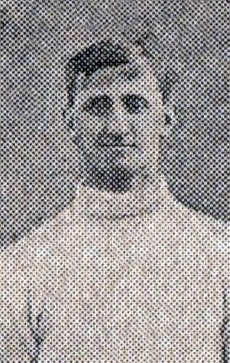
- Wise while with Brentford in 1909.

Personal information
- Full name: Albert William Wise
- Date of birth: 28 November 1884
- Place of birth: Olney, England
- Date of death: 30 May 1964 (aged 79)
- Place of death: Los Angeles, California, United States
- Position(s): Goalkeeper

Senior career*
Years	Team	Apps	(Gls)
- Irthlingborough
- Wellingborough
1905	Chelsea	0	(0)
1906–1908	Bradford City	22	(0)
1908–1912	Brentford	1	(0)
1912–1913	Bedford Town	41	(0)
- *Club domestic league appearances and goals

Albert William Wise (28 November 1884 – 30 May 1964), sometimes known as Micky Wise, was an English professional footballer who played as a goalkeeper in the Football League for Bradford City.

== Career statistics ==
Appearances and goals by club, season and competition
Club	Season	League			FA Cup		Total	
Club	Season	Division	Apps	Goals	Apps	Goals	Apps	Goals
Bradford City	1907–08	Second Division	4	0	0	0	4	0
Bradford City	1908–09	First Division	1	0	0	0	1	0
Bradford City	Total		5	0	0	0	5	0
Brentford	1909–10	Southern League First Division	1	0	0	0	1	0
Career total			6	0	0	0	6	0
