= Walter Bruce =

Walter Bruce may refer to:

- Walter Bruce (English footballer) (1915–?), who played for Workington, Bradford City and Swansea Town
- Walter Bruce (Northern Irish footballer) (1938–2015), who played for Glentoran and the Northern Ireland national team
- Walter Bruce (Scottish footballer) (1873–1941), who played for Renton and St Mirren
- Walter Bruce (Constant Moderator) (1605–1673), the only minister of the Church of Scotland to have served a perpetual role as Moderator
