= Arthur Seymour =

Arthur Seymour is the name of:

- Arthur Bliss Seymour (1859–1933), American botanist
- Arthur Seymour (footballer), English footballer
- Arthur Seymour (politician) (1832–1923), New Zealand politician
- A. J. Seymour (1914–1989), Guyanese poet and editor
