= Percy Hanger =

English footballer

Personal information
- Full name: Percy Kemshed Hanger
- Date of birth: 1889
- Place of birth: Kettering, England
- Date of death: 1939 (aged 49–50)
- Position: Centre half

Senior career*
Years	Team	Apps	(Gls)
- Kettering St Mary's
–1910	Kettering Town		
1910–1913	Leicester Fosse	54	(0)
- Kettering Town
- Stamford
- * Club domestic league appearances and goals

Percy Kemshed Hanger (1889–1939) was an English professional footballer who played as a centre half in the Football League for Leicester Fosse.

== Personal life ==
Hanger's brother Harry was also a footballer.

== Career statistics ==
Appearances and goals by club, season and competition
Club	Season	League			FA Cup		Total	
Club	Season	Division	Apps	Goals	Apps	Goals	Apps	Goals
Leicester Fosse	1909–10	First Division	3	0	0	0	3	0
Leicester Fosse	1910–11	First Division	8	0	0	0	8	0
Leicester Fosse	1911–12	First Division	22	0	3	1	25	1
Leicester Fosse	1912–13	First Division	21	0	0	0	21	0
Career total			54	0	3	1	57	1
