= John Campbell (footballer, born 1877) =

Scottish footballer (1877–1919)

Personal information
- Full name: John William Campbell
- Date of birth: 2 October 1877
- Place of birth: Glasgow, Scotland
- Date of death: 20 January 1919 (aged 41)
- Place of death: Glasgow, Scotland
- Height: 5 ft 5 in (1.65 m)
- Position: Outside left

Youth career
- Ferntower

Senior career*
Years	Team	Apps	(Gls)
- Renton Union
1893–1894	Linthouse		
1894–1896	Partick Thistle	35	(11)
1896–1898	Blackburn Rovers	56	(10)
1898–1902	Rangers	53	(27)
1902–1903	West Ham United	18	(1)
1903–1905	Hibernian	56	(10)
1905–1906	New Brompton	15	(3)
1906–1907	Partick Thistle	23	(7)
- Bo'ness
–1910	Dumbarton Harp		

International career
1899–1901	Scotland	4	(5)
1899	Scottish League XI	1	(1)
- * Club domestic league appearances and goals

John William Campbell (2 October 1877 – 20 January 1919) was a Scottish footballer who played as an outside left for Linthouse, Partick Thistle, Blackburn Rovers, Rangers, West Ham United, Hibernian and the Scotland national team.

== Life and career ==
Campbell was born in Glasgow and gained the most success in his career with Rangers with whom he won four successive league titles (1898–99, 1899–1900, 1900–01 and 1901–02) the first of which Rangers won all 18 of their Scottish league matches. He played alongside Jack Wilkie at four clubs.

He also represented Scotland at international level, winning four caps and scoring five goals, including a double in Scotland's biggest ever win – an 11–0 defeat of Ireland in February 1901. He also appeared for the Scottish League XI.

After his football career he became a ship's steward, but died aged just 41 from tuberculosis.

== Honours ==
Rangers

- Scottish League Division One: 1898–99, 1899–1900, 1900–01, 1901–02
- Glasgow Cup 1900–01
- Glasgow Merchants Charity Cup: 1898–99, 1899–1900
- Scottish Cup: Runner-up 1898–99

== Career statistics ==
Appearances and goals by club, season and competition
Club	Season	League			National Cup		Other		Total	
Club	Season	Division	Apps	Goals	Apps	Goals	Apps	Goals	Apps	Goals
Partick Thistle	1894–95	Scottish League Division Two	17	5	—		5 (Note: 3 appearances in Glasgow Cup, 2 appearances and 1 goal in Scottish Qualifying Cup.)	2	22	7
Partick Thistle	1895–96	Scottish League Division Two	18	6	—		7 (Note: 4 appearances and 3 goals in Scottish Qualifying Cup, 3 appearances in Glasgow Cup.)	3	25	9
Partick Thistle	Total		35	11	—		12	5	47	16
Rangers	1898–99	Scottish League Division One	16	12	5	1	14 (Note: 4 appearances and 1 goal in Glasgow Cup, 2 appearances and 1 goal in Glasgow Merchants Charity Cup, 8 appearances and 3 goals in Glasgow Football League.)	5	35	18
Rangers	1899–1900	Scottish League Division One	7	6	0	0	7 (Note: 1 appearance in Glasgow Cup, 1 appearance and 1 goal in Glasgow Merchants Charity Cup, 5 appearances and 1 goal in Inter City Football League.)	3	14	9
Rangers	1900–01	Scottish League Division One	18	5	1	0	12 (Note: 4 appearances and 1 goal in Glasgow Cup, 2 appearances in Glasgow Merchants Charity Cup, 6 appearances and 1 goal in Inter City Football League.)	2	31	7
Rangers	1901–02	Scottish League Division One	12	4	3	1	6 (Note: 2 appearances in Glasgow Cup, 4 appearances in Inter City Football League.)	0	21	5
Rangers	Total		53	27	9	2	39	10	101	39
West Ham United	1902–03	Southern League First Division	18	1	0	0	—		18	1
Hibernian	1903–04	Scottish League Division One	23	1	2	1	0	0	25	2
Hibernian	1904–05	Scottish League Division One	22	6	2	1	0	0	24	7
Hibernian	1905–06	Scottish League Division One	11	3	0	0	0	0	11	3
Hibernian	Total		56	10	4	2	0	0	60	12
New Brompton	1905–06	Southern League First Division	15	3	3	0	—		18	3
Partick Thistle	1906–07	Scottish League Division One	23	7	2	1			25	8
Career total			200	59	18	5	51	15	269	79
