= 1908–09 Bradford City A.F.C. season =

Bradford City A.F.C.
1908–09 season
- Manager: Peter O'Rourke
- Ground: Valley Parade
- First Division: 18th
- FA Cup: Third round

The 1908–09 Bradford City A.F.C. season was the sixth in the club's history.

The club finished 18th in Division One, and reached the 3rd round of the FA Cup.

== Sources ==
- Frost, Terry (1988). Bradford City A Complete Record 1903-1988. Breedon Books Sport. ISBN 0-907969-38-0.
