= Ben Prosser =

English footballer

Personal information
- Full name: Benjamin Prosser
- Date of birth: 1878
- Place of birth: Yorkshire, England
- Date of death: 1936 (aged 58)
- Position: Centre forward

Senior career*
Years	Team	Apps	(Gls)
–	Leeds		
1902–1903	Stoke	1	(0)
1903–1904	Bradford City	15	(1)
- * Club domestic league appearances and goals

Benjamin Prosser (1878 – 1936) was an English footballer who played in the Football League for Bradford City and Stoke.

== Career ==
Prosser was born in Yorkshire and began his career with Leeds before making the move to Stoke in 1902. He played once for Stoke in 1902–03 season which came in a 2–0 loss at Derby County in March 1903. He then moved on to Bradford City where he spent the 1903–04 season scoring five goals in 19 matches for the "Bantams".

== Career statistics ==
Club	Season	League			FA Cup		Total	
Club	Season	Division	Apps	Goals	Apps	Goals	Apps	Goals
Stoke	1902–03	First Division	1	0	0	0	1	0
Bradford City	1903–04	Second Division	15	1	4	4	19	5
Career Total			16	1	4	4	20	5
