= 1900–01 Rangers F.C. season =

Rangers
1900–01 season
- Chairman: James Henderson
- Manager: William Wilton
- Ground: Ibrox Park
- Scottish League Division One: 1st P20 W17 D1 L2 F60 A25 Pts35
- Scottish Cup: First round
- Top goalscorer: League: Robert Hamilton (20); All: Robert Hamilton (20)

The 1900–01 season was the 27th season of competitive football by Rangers.

== Overview ==
Rangers played a total of 21 competitive matches during the 1900–01 season. The club finished top of the Scottish League Division One, having won 17 of their 20 league matches (including a 100% home record).

The second placed side, Celtic, who had finished six points behind Rangers did knock Wilton's team out of the Scottish Cup after a 1-0 away defeat.

== Results ==
All results are written with Rangers' score first.

=== Scottish League Division One ===
Date	Opponent	Venue	Result	Attendance	Scorers
18 August 1900	Third Lanark	H	4–0	10,000	Cameron (2), Gibson, McPherson
25 August 1900	Heart of Midlothian	A	1–0	10,000	Neil
1 September 1900	Kilmarnock	H	5–1	9,500	Campbell (2), Hamilton, Cameron, A.Smith
8 September 1900	Partick Thistle	A	2–1	9,000	A.Smith, Cameron
17 September 1900	Hibernian	A	1–4		Campbell
24 September 1900	Heart of Midlothian	H	1–0	6,000	A.Smith
29 September 1900	Queen's Park	H	3–2	16,000	Robertson (pen), McPherson, Russell (og)
6 October 1900	Celtic	A	1–2	12,000	Cameron
13 October 1900	Third Lanark	A	1–1	5,000	McPherson
20 October 1900	Dundee	H	4–2	9,000	Hamilton (3), A.Smith
1 November 1900	Partick Thistle	H	4–1	7,000	Hamilton (3), A.Smith
17 November 1900	Greenock Morton	A	3–1	17,000	Hamilton, Speedie, McPherson
24 November 1900	St Mirren	H	5–2	6,000	Hamilton (4), Graham
1 December 1900	Kilmarnock	A	2–1	10,000	Speedie, McPherson
15 December 1900	Dundee	A	5–1	10,000	Campbell (2), Hamilton, Robertson, A.Smith
29 December 1900	Queen's Park	H	3–2	11,000	Robertson, Graham, Speedie
1 January 1901	Celtic	H	2–1	30,000	Speedie, McPherson
5 January 1901	St Mirren	A	4–1	6,000	Hamilton (3), McPherson
26 January 1901	Hibernian	H	6–0		Hamilton (2), Sharp (2), A.Smith, Handling (og)
16 February 1901	Greenock Morton	H	3–2	5,000	Hamilton (2), Speedie

=== Scottish Cup ===
Date	Round	Opponent	Venue	Result	Attendance	Scorers
12 January 1901	R1	Celtic	A	0–1	28,000	

== Appearances ==
Player	Position	Appearances	Goals
(Scotland) Matthew Dickie	GK	21	0
(Scotland) John Tait Robertson	DF	21	3
(Scotland) Neilly Gibson	MF	20	1
(Scotland) Robert Hamilton	FW	20	20
(Scotland) Jock Drummond	DF	19	0
(Scotland) John Campbell	MF	19	5
(Scotland) Nicol Smith	DF	19	0
(Scotland) John McPherson	MF	18	7
(Scotland) Alec Smith	FW	18	7
(Scotland) James Stark	DF	12	0
(Scotland) Finlay Speedie	FW	12	5
(Scotland) Robert Neil	DF	10	1
(Scotland) Donald Cameron	MF	9	5
(Scotland) David Crawford	DF	4	0
(Scotland) James Graham	MF	5	2
(Scotland) Andrew Sharp	MF	3	2
(Scotland) James Tutty	MF	1	0

== See also ==
- 1900–01 in Scottish football
- 1900–01 Scottish Cup
