= 1900–01 in Scottish football =

Football in Scotland
- Season: 1900–01

1900–01 in Scottish football

Division One champions
- Rangers

Division Two champions
- St Bernard's

Scottish Cup winners
- Heart of Midlothian

Junior Cup winners
- Burnbank Athletic

Scotland national team
- 1901 BHC

The 1900–01 season was the 28th season of competitive football in Scotland and the 11th season of the Scottish Football League.

== League competitions ==
=== Scottish League Division One ===
| Pos | Team | Pld | W | D | L | GF | GA | GD | Pts | Qualification or relegation |
|---|---|---|---|---|---|---|---|---|---|---|
| 1 | Rangers (C) | 20 | 17 | 1 | 2 | 60 | 25 | +35 | 35 | Champions |
| 2 | Celtic | 20 | 13 | 3 | 4 | 49 | 28 | +21 | 29 | |
| 3 | Hibernian | 20 | 9 | 7 | 4 | 29 | 22 | +7 | 25 | |
| 4 | Morton | 20 | 9 | 3 | 8 | 40 | 40 | 0 | 21 | |
| 5 | Kilmarnock | 20 | 7 | 4 | 9 | 35 | 47 | −12 | 18 | |
| 5 | Third Lanark | 20 | 6 | 6 | 8 | 20 | 29 | −9 | 18 | |
| 7 | Dundee | 20 | 6 | 5 | 9 | 36 | 35 | +1 | 17 | |
| 7 | Queen's Park | 20 | 7 | 3 | 10 | 33 | 37 | −4 | 17 | |
| 9 | St Mirren | 20 | 5 | 6 | 9 | 33 | 43 | −10 | 16 | |
| 10 | Heart of Midlothian | 20 | 5 | 4 | 11 | 22 | 30 | −8 | 14 | |
| 11 | Partick Thistle (R) | 20 | 4 | 2 | 14 | 28 | 49 | −21 | 10 | Relegated to the 1901–02 Scottish Division Two |

Source: "1900-1901 Division 1 - SPFL Archive". SPFL.
Rules for classification: Teams finish equal if level on points. Points system: 2 points for a win, 1 point for a draw, 0 points for a loss
(C) Champions; (R) Relegated

Champions: Rangers

=== Scottish League Division Two ===
| Pos | Team | Pld | W | D | L | GF | GA | GD | Pts |
|---|---|---|---|---|---|---|---|---|---|
| 1 | St Bernard's (C) | 18 | 11 | 4 | 3 | 42 | 26 | +16 | 26 |
| 2 | Airdrieonians | 18 | 11 | 1 | 6 | 43 | 32 | +11 | 23 |
| 3 | Abercorn | 18 | 9 | 3 | 6 | 37 | 33 | +4 | 21 |
| 4 | Clyde | 18 | 9 | 2 | 7 | 43 | 35 | +8 | 20 |
| 4 | Port Glasgow Athletic | 18 | 10 | 0 | 8 | 45 | 43 | +2 | 20 |
| 6 | Ayr | 18 | 9 | 0 | 9 | 32 | 34 | −2 | 18 |
| 7 | East Stirlingshire | 18 | 7 | 3 | 8 | 34 | 39 | −5 | 17 |
| 8 | Hamilton Academical | 18 | 4 | 4 | 10 | 41 | 49 | −8 | 12 |
| 8 | Leith Athletic | 18 | 5 | 2 | 11 | 22 | 32 | −10 | 12 |
| 10 | Motherwell | 18 | 4 | 3 | 11 | 26 | 42 | −16 | 11 |

Source: statto.com
Rules for classification: Teams finish equal if level on points. Points system: 2 points for a win, 1 point for a draw, 0 points for a loss
(C) Champions

== Other honours ==
=== Cup honours ===
==== National ====
| Competition | Winner | Score | Runner-up |
|---|---|---|---|
| Scottish Cup | Hearts | 4 – 3 | Celtic |
| Scottish Qualifying Cup | Stenhousemuir | 3 – 0 | East Stirlingshire |
| Scottish Junior Cup | Burnbank Athletic | 2 – 0 | Maryhill |

==== County ====
| Competition | Winner | Score | Runner-up |
|---|---|---|---|
| Aberdeenshire Cup | Orion | 2 – 1 | Victoria United |
| Ayrshire Cup | Ayr | 2 – 1 (Note: Replay needed.) | Stevenston Thistle |
| Border Cup | Vale of Leithen | 3 – 1 | Kelso |
| Dumbartonshire Cup | Vale of Leven | 2 – 1 | Dumbarton |
| East of Scotland Shield | Leith Athletic | 3 – 2 | Hearts |
| Fife Cup | Hearts of Beith | w.o. (Note: Match awarded via walkover.) | Raith Rovers |
| Forfarshire Cup | Dundee | 1 – 0 | Dundee Wanderers |
| Glasgow Cup | Rangers | 3 – 1 | Partick Thistle |
| Lanarkshire Cup | Motherwell | 3 – 1 | Hamilton |
| Linlithgowshire Cup | Bo'ness | 3 – 0 | Bathgate |
| North of Scotland Cup | Inverness Citadel | 2 – 0 | Inverness Caledonian |
| Perthshire Cup | Dunblane | 4 – 2 | Auchterarder Thistle |
| Renfrewshire Cup | Morton | 4 – 2 (Note: Aggregate over two legs.) | St Mirren |
| Southern Counties Cup | Dumfries | 4 – 3 | 6th GRV |
| Stirlingshire Cup | East Stirlingshire | 3 – 2 | Camelon |

=== Non-league honours ===
Highland League

Top Three
| Pos | Team | Pld | W | D | L | GF | GA | GD | Pts |
|---|---|---|---|---|---|---|---|---|---|
| 1 | Clachnacuddin | 10 | 6 | 2 | 2 | 22 | 7 | +15 | 14 |
| 2 | Inverness Caledonian | 10 | 5 | 2 | 3 | 33 | 16 | +17 | 12 |
| 3 | Inverness Citadel | 9 | 3 | 4 | 2 | 26 | 15 | +11 | 10 |

Source: SFHA

Other Senior Leagues

| Division | Winner |
|---|---|
| Banffshire & District League | Elgin City United |
| Central Combination | Stenhousemuir |
| Falkirk District League | King's Park |
| Northern League | Dundee 'A' |
| Perthshire League | Scone |
| Scottish Combination | Arthurlie |

== Scotland national team ==
| Date | Venue | Opponents | Score (Note: Scotland's score is shown first.) | Competition | Scotland scorer(s) |
|---|---|---|---|---|---|
| 23 February 1901 | Celtic Park, Glasgow (H) | Ireland | 11–0 | BHC | Robert Hamilton (4), Sandy McMahon (3), John W. Campbell (2), John McPherson, David Russell |
| 2 March 1901 | Racecourse Ground, Wrexham (A) | Wales | 1–1 | BHC | John Robertson |
| 30 March 1901 | Crystal Palace, London (A) | England | 2–2 | BHC | John Campbell, Robert Hamilton |

Key:

- (H) = Home match
- (A) = Away match
- BHC = British Home Championship

| Team | Pld | W | D | L | GF | GA | GD | Pts |
|---|---|---|---|---|---|---|---|---|
| England (C) | 3 | 2 | 1 | 0 | 11 | 2 | +9 | 5 |
| Scotland | 3 | 1 | 2 | 0 | 14 | 3 | +11 | 4 |
| Wales | 3 | 1 | 1 | 1 | 2 | 7 | −5 | 3 |
| Ireland | 3 | 0 | 0 | 3 | 0 | 15 | −15 | 0 |

Rules for classification: 1) points. The points system worked as follows: 2 points for a win and 1 point for a draw.
(C) Champions

== Other national teams ==
=== Scottish League XI ===
| Date | Venue | Opponents | Score (Note: Scottish League XI's score is shown first.) | Scotland scorer(s) |
|---|---|---|---|---|
| 16 February 1901 | Belfast (A) | (Northern Ireland) Irish League XI | 2–1 | Nicol Smith, Alex Smith |
| 16 March 1901 | Ibrox Park, Glasgow (H) | (England) Football League XI | 6–2 | Robert Hamilton (3), Bobby Walker, Robert McColl, Alex Smith |

== See also ==
- 1900–01 Rangers F.C. season
