= 1905–06 Bradford City A.F.C. season =

Bradford City A.F.C.
1905–06 season
- Manager: Peter O'Rourke
- Ground: Valley Parade
- Second Division: 11th
- FA Cup: Third round

The 1905–06 Bradford City A.F.C. season was the third in the club's history.

The club finished 11th in Division Two, and reached the 3rd round of the FA Cup.

At the end of the season, in May 1906, 1,500 people attended a meeting criticising the club's committee. A Commission of Inquiry was appointed and recommended forming a limited liability company to own the club, which was initially rejected before being approved in June 1908.

== Sources ==
- Frost, Terry (1988). Bradford City A Complete Record 1903-1988. Breedon Books Sport. ISBN 0-907969-38-0.
