= Andrew Wilson (football left-back) =

Scottish footballer

Personal information
- Position: Left back

Senior career*
Years	Team	Apps	(Gls)
1895–1896	Strathclyde		
1896–1897	Sunderland	2	(0)
1897–1905	Partick Thistle	123	(0)
1904–1905	→ Alloa Athletic (loan)		
1905–1906	Alloa Athletic		
- * Club domestic league appearances and goals

Andrew Wilson was a Scottish professional footballer who played as a left back for Sunderland and Partick Thistle. (Note: Some sources state that he played for Motherwell, but this was a different man of the same name who played as a forward.)

He spent seven full seasons at Partick after joining the club in 1897, winning the 1899–1900 Scottish Division Two title (the team was relegated, but gained promotion again in 1902) and forming a defensive partnership with Robert Campbell for much of that time. Although he had reached the end of his time with the club and had already been out on loan to Alloa Athletic (who would soon sign him on a permanent basis), at the end of his eighth campaign on the books at Thistle in May 1905 he was granted a benefit match against Celtic.
