= Charles Drain =

Charles Drain may refer to:

- Charles Drain (pioneer) (1816–1894), American pioneer and founder of the town of Drain, Oregon
- Charles Drain (politician) (1913–1991), American-born Canadian politician

== See also ==
- Drain (surname)
