= 1904–05 Bradford City A.F.C. season =

Bradford City A.F.C.
1904–05 season
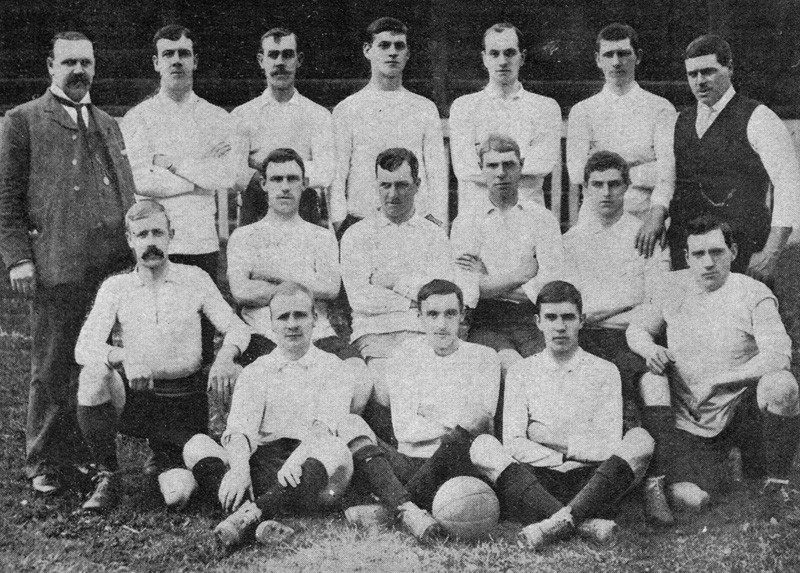
- The Bradford City team in 1903
- Manager: Peter O'Rourke
- Ground: Valley Parade
- Second Division: 8th
- FA Cup: First round

The 1904–05 Bradford City A.F.C. season was the second in the club's history.

Reserve manager Peter O'Rourke took over for the last few games of the season, leading them to 5 wins and a draw in the last six games of the season, and helping them to avoid possible re-election. He became permanent manager shortly afterwards. The club finished 8th in Division Two, and reached the 1st round of the FA Cup.

== Sources ==
- Frost, Terry (1988). Bradford City A Complete Record 1903-1988. Breedon Books Sport. ISBN 0-907969-38-0.
