= Watty Shirlaw =

Scottish footballer

Personal information
- Full name: Walter P. Shirlaw
- Date of birth: 1902
- Place of birth: Wishaw, Scotland
- Position: Goalkeeper

Senior career*
Years	Team	Apps	(Gls)
- Larkhall Thistle
1924–1927	Bradford City		
- Rochdale
1928–1932	Bradford City		
- Halifax Town
- Workington
- * Club domestic league appearances and goals

Walter P. Shirlaw, known as Watty Shirlaw (born 1902) was a Scottish professional footballer who played as a goalkeeper.

== Career ==
Born Wishaw, Shirlaw played for Larkhall Thistle, Bradford City, Rochdale, Halifax Town and Workington. For Bradford City, he made a total of 99 appearances in the Football League; he also made 12 FA Cup appearances.

== Sources ==
- Frost, Terry (1988). Bradford City A Complete Record 1903-1988. Breedon Books Sport. ISBN 0-907969-38-0.
