= Robert Campbell (footballer, born 1882) =

Scottish footballer

Personal information
- Date of birth: 1882
- Place of birth: Lugar, Scotland
- Date of death: 13 March 1931 (aged 49)
- Place of death: Ayr, Scotland
- Position: Full back

Senior career*
Years	Team	Apps	(Gls)
1898–1905	Partick Thistle	108	(2)
1905	Rangers	2	(0)
1905–1906	Millwall Athletic	28	(0)
1906–1915	Bradford City	223	(1)

International career
1903	Scottish League XI	1	(0)
- * Club domestic league appearances and goals

Robert Campbell (1882 – 13 March 1931) was a Scottish footballer who played for Partick Thistle, Rangers, Millwall Athletic and Bradford City. He was a full back who won the 1911 FA Cup with Bradford.

== Career ==
Born in Lugar in 1882, Campbell started his football career with Partick Thistle, with whom he formed a partnership over several seasons with Andrew Wilson and won Scottish League XI and Glasgow FA representative honours, before moving to Rangers in January 1905 as emergency cover following the death of Nicol Smith. He moved to England and Millwall Athletic in the Southern League later that same year. He spent one season at Millwall, playing 28 games before moving to Division Two side Bradford City. He partnered Fred Farren in the City full back line, helping the club to win the Division Two title in 1907–08 and then the FA Cup in 1911. He played a total of 223 league games and 24 FA Cup games for City before retiring after football in England was suspended because of the First World War.

He was also a keen angler and cricketer with the Clydesdale Cricket Club. He died on 13 March 1931 in Ayr County Hospital aged 49.

== Honours ==
Bradford City

- English Division Two: 1907–08
- FA Cup: 1911
