= Tony Carter (footballer) =

English footballer

Personal information
- Full name: Anthony John Herbert Carter
- Date of birth: 17 December 1881
- Place of birth: Bishopwearmouth, Sunderland
- Date of death: 1970 (aged 88)
- Position: Full back

Senior career*
Years	Team	Apps	(Gls)
	Sunderland	0	(0)
1903–1906	Bradford City	30	(0)
- Carlisle United
- * Club domestic league appearances and goals

Anthony John Herbert Carter (17 December 1881 – 1970) was an English professional footballer who played as a full back.

== Career ==
Carter played for Sunderland, Bradford City and Carlisle United. For Bradford City, he made 30 appearances in the Football League; he also made 9 FA Cup appearances.

== Sources ==
- Frost, Terry (1988). Bradford City A Complete Record 1903-1988. Breedon Books Sport. ISBN 0-907969-38-0.
