= Wilson Parker =

English footballer

Personal information
- Date of birth: 1909
- Place of birth: Ryton, England
- Height: 5 ft 10 in (1.78 m)
- Position: Goalkeeper

Senior career*
Years	Team	Apps	(Gls)
- Carlisle United
1932–1936	Bradford City	125	(0)
- * Club domestic league appearances and goals

Wilson Parker (born 1909) was an English professional footballer who played as a goalkeeper.

== Career ==
Born in Ryton, Parker played for Carlisle United and Bradford City. For Bradford City, he made 125 appearances in the Football League; he also made 11 FA Cup appearances.

== Sources ==
- Frost, Terry (1988). Bradford City A Complete Record 1903–1988. Breedon Books Sport. ISBN 0-907969-38-0.
