= Robert Wilkie (cricketer) =

New Zealand cricketer (1878–1966)

Personal information
- Full name: Robert Alexander Wilkie
- Born: 23 November 1878; New Cumnock, Ayrshire, Scotland
- Died: 7 November 1966 (aged 87); Sydney, New South Wales, Australia

Domestic team information
- Years: Team
- 1899/00: Otago
- Source: CrickcetArchive, 28 May 2016

Robert Alexander Wilkie (23 November 1878 – 7 November 1966) was a Scottish-born sportsman. He played one first-class cricket match in New Zealand for Otago during the 1899–1900 season and later represented Otago at lawn tennis.

Wilkie was born at New Cumnock in Ayrshire, Scotland in 1878, the son of John Lamb Wilkie and his wife Annie (née Reid). His father worked as a coachman before the family emigrated to New Zealand in 1883 on board the SS Trevelyan, settling at Dunedin in Otago. His father established a flour mill at Mosgiel near Dunedin in Otago and whilst his brothers John and David later joined the business which operated as Wilkie & Co., Robert Wilkie qualified as an accountant and worked for shipping companies.

Along with his brother John, Wilkie played for Dunedin Cricket Club. He was the first player to score a century for the team, and served on the club's committee.

In January 1899 he played for an Otago XI against the New Zealand team which was to tour Australia, and during the 1899–1900 season "performed creditably" in his only first-class match, a fixture between Otago and Wellington, making scores of 11 and 19 in a heavy Otago loss. Later in the season he played alongside his brother in an Otago XI against Southland, and in March 1900 played again for an Otago XI against a touring Melbourne Cricket Club side. Playing against Canterbury and Hawke's Bay he later "gave a brilliant display of batting".

Considered "well known" as a cricket, and "one of Otago's promising young bats", Wilkie left Dunedin in February 1902 to work in Sydney in Australia for the first time. He played cricket for Sydney Cricket Club, including at First Grade level by 1904, before returning to Dunedin in 1908. An injury that he had sustained to his shoulder whilst in Australia meant that he was unable to play cricket, although he remained associated with the Dunedin club and acted as its auditor.

Rather than cricket, Wilkie took up lawn tennis and, with his wife, was a "prominent" member of the Kaituna club. He won the Otago doubles title twice, played competitively for Otago, and was considered a possibility for the New Zealand Davis Cup team in 1920 against Great Britain. He served on the committee and was the vice-president of the Otago Lawn Tennis Association and was involved in the organisation of the sport in the province until he was again transferred to Sydney in 1923. He continued to play tennis in Sydney.

Wilkie died at Bexley in Sydney in 1966. He was aged 87. Either his mother Annie or his sister, Annie Will, were a signatory of the 1893 Women's Suffrage Petition whilst the family lived in Lees Street in Dunedin.
