= Lauren Drain =

American author and fitness model (born 1985)

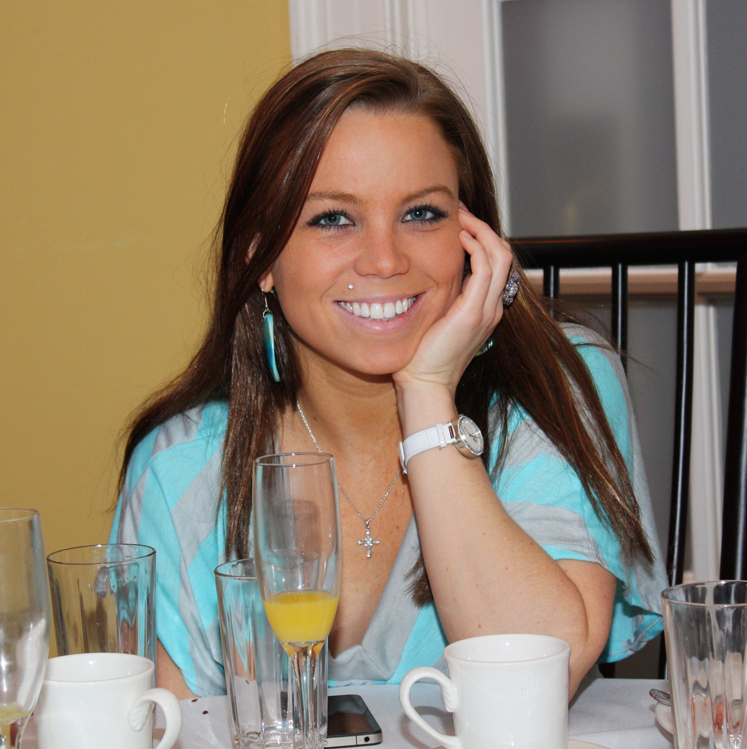
- Drain in 2010
- Born: December 31, 1985 (age 40); Tampa, Florida, U.S.
- Other names: Lauren Kagan, Lauren Drain Kagan
- Education: B.S., nursing (Washburn University, 2007)
- Occupations: Fitness model, personal trainer, nurse, author
- Spouse: David Kagan (m. 2013)
- Children: 1
- Website: www.laurendrain.com

Lauren Drain (born December 31, 1985) is an American nurse and former member of the Westboro Baptist Church who wrote the 2013 book Banished, which chronicles her experiences and eventual banishment from the church.

== Early life ==
Drain was born in Tampa, Florida, and lived in nearby Bradenton until age five, when she moved to Olathe, Kansas in the midst of her younger sister Taylor Drain's struggle against cancer, travelling alongside her father, Steve Drain, who enrolled in a graduate program at the University of Kansas.

Steve Drain first came into contact with Westboro while working on a documentary critical of the church. He eventually became a fervent convert, and his entire family followed him into the church. Lauren Drain was a member from 2001 until 2007, when she was excommunicated for questioning church doctrine and unauthorized contact with a Connecticut man seeking to learn more about the church. Following her excommunication, she briefly lived on her own in Topeka, but was haunted by reminders of her banishment from the church and her family, eventually deciding to move to Connecticut. Her parents, two sisters, and brother remained members of the church and cut all ties with her. However, sometime in 2020, Steve started to feel that the picket signs the church carried were too harsh and that the signs should be more focused on God's grace and salvation. He sent an email to church members explaining this and saying that he and his family would no longer be participating in pickets. As a result of this email, the next day the church voted to excommunicate Lauren's parents and two of her siblings. Lauren's sister Taylor Drain Phelps remains a member of the church. Drain claimed in a YouTube video released in 2023 that she and her family had re-established their relationship.

Drain graduated from Topeka West High School in Topeka, Kansas and earned a Wiseman Scholarship to Washburn University.

== Career ==
Drain graduated from Washburn University in 2007 with a Bachelor of Science degree in nursing. She worked as a registered nurse for nine years before becoming a full-time personal trainer and fitness model.

Drain participated in the NOH8 Campaign in 2013.

Drain wrote the book titled Banished: Surviving My Years in the Westboro Baptist Church, co-authored by Lisa Pulitzer, which describes her experiences in the Westboro Baptist Church and her ultimate expulsion from the church. It has been on the New York Best Sellers list in the eBook category as of March 30, 2013.

== Personal life ==
Drain has been married to David Kagan since August 2013. As of 2013, she lives in Connecticut. She identifies as a Christian. In 2019, Drain and her husband announced that they were expecting a baby, and Drain gave birth to a child later that year.

== See also ==
- Megan Phelps-Roper
- Nathan Phelps
