= Bill Murphy (footballer) =

English footballer

- Bill Murphy c. 1952

Personal information
- Full name: John William Murphy
- Date of birth: 21 November 1921
- Place of birth: Birstall, West Yorkshire, England
- Date of death: 2004 (aged 82–83)
- Position: Wing half

Youth career
- 19??–1939: Heckmondwike Spen
- 1939–1946: Liverpool

Senior career*
Years	Team	Apps	(Gls)
1946–1952	Bradford City	146	(9)
1952	Scarborough	?	(?)
????	Weybridge	?	(?)
- * Club domestic league appearances and goals

John William Murphy (21 November 1921 – 2004) was an English professional footballer who played as a wing half.

== Career ==
Murphy had played football in the army. He began his career with Heckmondwike Spen and Liverpool, before turning professional with Bradford City in 1946. Murphy made 146 appearances in the Football League for Bradford, scoring nine goals. He dislocated an elbow in a game in 1949. He later played non-league football with Scarborough and Weybridge.
