= John Wilkie (cricketer) =

New Zealand cricketer (1877–1963)

Personal information
- Full name: John Lamb Wilkie
- Born: 29 January 1877; New Cumnock, Ayrshire, Scotland
- Died: 19 June 1963 (aged 86); Mosgiel, Otago, New Zealand
- Relatives: Robert Wilkie (brother)

Domestic team information
- Years: Team
- 1901/02: Otago
- Source: Cricinfo, 28 May 2016

John Lamb Wilkie (29 January 1877 – 19 June 1963) was a Scottish-born cricketer. He played two first-class matches in New Zealand for Otago during the 1901–02 season.

Wilkie was born at New Cumnock in Ayrshire, Scotland in 1877, the son of John Lamb Wilkie and his wife Annie (née Reid). His father worked as a coachman before the family emigrated to New Zealand in 1883 on board the SS Trevelyan, settling at Dunedin in Otago. His father established a flour mill at Mosgiel near Dunedin in Otago. Wilkie and his brother, David, later joined the business which operated as Wilkie & Co., remaining as partners in the business after there father's death in 1926. The partnership was dissolved in 1940.

Along with his brother Robert, Wilkie played for Dunedin Cricket Club. The brothers played together in an Otago XI against Southland in February 1900, and during the following season Wilkie played both of his first-class matches for Otago. On debut against Canterbury at Christchurch he recorded a duck before scoring 73 runs in his second innings, whilst against Hawke's Bay he scored 49 runs in the only innings in which he batted and took a wicket. He played for Dunedin until at least 1910.

Wilkie died at Mosgiel in 1963. He was aged 86. Either his mother Annie or his sister, Annie Will, were a signatory of the 1893 Women's Suffrage Petition whilst the family lived in Lees Street in Dunedin.
