= 1906–07 Bradford City A.F.C. season =

Bradford City A.F.C.
1906–07 season
- Manager: Peter O'Rourke
- Ground: Valley Parade
- Second Division: 5th
- FA Cup: Third round

The 1906–07 Bradford City A.F.C. season was the fourth in the club's history.

The club finished 5th in Division Two, and reached the 3rd round of the FA Cup.

During the season there was talk of a merger with city rivals Bradford (Park Avenue). A meeting was held on 28 May 1907, with the proposal being rejected by 1,031 votes against to 487 for.

== Sources ==
- Frost, Terry (1988). Bradford City A Complete Record 1903-1988. Breedon Books Sport. ISBN 0-907969-38-0.
