= Everitt Moore =

English footballer

Personal information
- Position: Forward

Senior career*
Years	Team	Apps	(Gls)
- Rawdon
1903–1904	Bradford City	3	(0)
- * Club domestic league appearances and goals

Everitt W. Moore was an English professional footballer who played as a forward.

== Career ==
Moore joined Bradford City from Rawdon in June 1903. He made 3 league appearances for the club. He was released by the club in 1904.

== Sources ==
- Frost, Terry (1988). Bradford City A Complete Record 1903-1988. Breedon Books Sport. ISBN 0-907969-38-0.
