= Albert Partridge =

English footballer

Personal information
- Date of birth: 13 February 1901
- Place of birth: Birmingham, England
- Position: Outside right

Senior career*
Years	Team	Apps	(Gls)
1921–1922	Newcastle United		
- Redditch
1923–1929	Sheffield United	89	(18)
1929–1933	Bradford City	55	(7)
1933–1934	Northampton Town		
Total		144+	(25+)
- * Club domestic league appearances and goals

Albert E. Partridge (born 13 February 1901) was an English professional footballer who played as an outside right.

== Career ==
Born in Birmingham, Partridge played for Newcastle United, Redditch, Sheffield United, Bradford City and Northampton Town.

For Sheffield United, he scored 18 goals in 89 league matches.

For Bradford City, he made 55 appearances in the Football League; he also made 3 FA Cup appearances.

== Sources ==
- Frost, Terry (1988). Bradford City A Complete Record 1903–1988. Breedon Books Sport. ISBN 0-907969-38-0.
