= Samuel Bright =

Scottish footballer

Personal information
- Place of birth: Kilmarnock, Scotland
- Position: Defender

Senior career*
Years	Team	Apps	(Gls)
- Sheffield United
1903–1904	Bradford City	6	(0)
- * Club domestic league appearances and goals

Samuel Bright was a Scottish professional footballer who played as a defender.

== Career ==
Born in Kilmarnock, Bright played for Sheffield United and Bradford City. For Bradford City, he made 6 appearances in the Football League.

== Sources ==
- Frost, Terry (1988). Bradford City A Complete Record 1903-1988. Breedon Books Sport. ISBN 0-907969-38-0.
