= Alf Peachey =

English footballer

Personal information
- Date of birth: 1908
- Place of birth: St Helens, England
- Height: 5 ft 9 in (1.75 m)
- Position: Centre half

Senior career*
Years	Team	Apps	(Gls)
- Atherton Collieries
1928–1938	Bradford City	191	(1)
1938	Torquay United		
1938–1940	Sligo Rovers		
- * Club domestic league appearances and goals

Alfred Peachey (born 1908) was an English professional footballer who played as a centre half.

== Career ==
Born in St Helens, Peachey played for Atherton Collieries, Bradford City and Torquay United. For Bradford City, he made 191 appearances in the Football League; he also made 10 FA Cup appearances.

Peachey later joined Sligo Rovers and helped them to the final of the FAI Cup in 1939 which was lost to Shelbourne after a replay. He made 60 appearances for the club and also served as trainer.

== Sources ==
- Frost, Terry (1988). Bradford City A Complete Record 1903–1988. Breedon Books Sport. ISBN 0-907969-38-0.
