= Robert Campbell (football manager) =

Scottish football manager

Robert Campbell was a Scottish football manager who was the first club manager of Bradford City when the club was formed in 1903.

== Managerial career ==
Campbell was secretary-manager of Sunderland for three years after succeeding Tom Watson in August 1896. At that time, his stepbrother John was already at the club playing as an important forward. On 18 April 1898, Campbell was offered and accepted the position of Woolwich Arsenal manager. However, during the following week he changed his mind and stayed at Sunderland.

In 1899, he joined Bristol City in a similar managerial capacity as at Sunderland. He helped City achieve election to the Football League from the Southern League, but resigned following a dispute with the club's directors.

In 1903, he joined Bradford City. The club was administered by a 13-man sub-committee from Manningham Rugby Football Club, from which Bradford City was formed. Campbell was appointed the club's first manager on 20 June 1903 from a list of 30 applicants. He led the club through its first two seasons in Division Two guiding City to 10th in 1903–04 and eighth the following campaign. He left the club in October 1905 by mutual consent, to be succeeded by Peter O'Rourke.

He had spells involved in the management committee of the newly formed West Yorkshire League and as manager of Clapton Orient before returning to Scotland.
