= William Thomas Drain =

Scottish footballer (1905–?)

Willian Drain
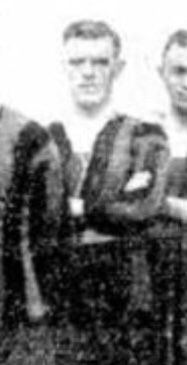
- VIC Park Team photo 1933

Personal information
- Full name: William Thomas Drain
- Date of birth: 11 May 1905
- Place of birth: Bradford, Yorkshire, England
- Date of death: 1 November 1984 (aged 79)
- Place of death: Willagee, Western Australia - Australia
- Position: Centre-half

Senior career*
Years	Team	Apps	(Gls)
- Celtic F.C.
- Bradford A.F.C.
1928-1930	Railways S.C.	25	(10)
1930-1940	Victoria Park S.C.	67	(5)
1940-1950	South Perth United		
Medal record
1930 Soccer Association league Cup, 1932 Challenge Cup, 1932 Charity Cup, 1933 Challenge Cup, 1933 Charity Cup, 1934 League Cup, 1934 Challenge Cup, 1934 Charity Cup, 1935 League Cup, 1935 Challenge Cup, 1935 Charity Cup, 1936 League Cup, 1936 Challenge Cup (Joint Winners), 1936 Charity Cup, 1937 League Cup, 1937 Challenge Cup (Joint Winners), 1937 Charity Cup (Joint Winners), 1937 Association Cup, 1938 League Cup, 1938 Challenge Cup, 1938 Charity Cup (Joint Winners), 1938 Association Cup, 1939 League Cup, 1939 Challenge Cup, 1939 Charity Cup (Joint Winners), 1939 Association Cup, 1940 League Cup, 1940 Challenge Cup, 1940 Charity Cup (Joint Winners), 1940 Association Cup
- * Club domestic league appearances and goals

William Drain (born 11 May 1905, Bradford) was a Scottish footballer who played as a centre-half in Scotland, England and Australia for Celtic F.C. Bradford City Railways S.C, Victoria Park S.C, South Perth United Veterans League retiring to be a referee in the Western Australian Soccer Association. William also represented Bunbury on a number of occasions and was Captain of the Scotland v England Charity Cup.

Victoria Park S.C was a dominant force in the League during the 1930’s. Winning either the league or associated cups.

His father Thomas Drain was also a professional football player who played for clubs in England and Scotland.

William's grandson Ross Greer was also a professional football player who played for clubs in Australia China and England.
