= John Harper (footballer) =

Scottish footballer

Personal information
- Date of birth: 1883
- Place of birth: Ayrshire, Scotland
- Position: Outside right

Senior career*
Years	Team	Apps	(Gls)
- Maybole
1904	Bradford City	2	(0)
- * Club domestic league appearances and goals

John Harper (born 1883) was a Scottish professional footballer who played as an outside right.

== Career ==
Born in Ayrshire, Harper played for Maybole and Bradford City.

For Bradford City he made 2 appearances in the Football League.

== Sources ==
- Frost, Terry (1988). Bradford City A Complete Record 1903-1988. Breedon Books Sport. ISBN 0-907969-38-0.
