= Richard Guy (footballer) =

English footballer

Personal information
- Full name: Richard William Guy
- Date of birth: 4 August 1877
- Place of birth: Madeley, Shropshire, England
- Date of death: 1938 (aged 60–61)
- Position: Outside right

Senior career*
Years	Team	Apps	(Gls)
1902	Manchester City	0	(0)
1903–1904	Bradford City	6	(1)
1904–1908	Hastings & St Leonards United		
1908–1909	Leeds City	18	(3)
1909–1910	Portsmouth		
- Hastings & St Leonards United
- * Club domestic league appearances and goals

Richard William Guy (4 August 1877 – 1938) was an English professional footballer who played as an outside right for Bradford City and Leeds City in the Football League.

== Personal life ==
Guy enlisted in the Special Reserve in March 1908 and he served for a year on the Western Front in the Duke of Lancaster's Own Yeomanry during the First World War.

== Career statistics ==
Appearances and goals by club, season and competition
Club	Season	League			FA Cup		Total	
Club	Season	Division	Apps	Goals	Apps	Goals	Apps	Goals
Leeds City	1908–09	Second Division	18	3	4	1	22	4
Career total			18	3	4	1	22	4
