= John Beckram =

English footballer

Personal information
- Place of birth: Sunderland, England
- Position: Forward

Senior career*
Years	Team	Apps	(Gls)
- Sheffield United
1903–1905	Bradford City	25	(6)
- * Club domestic league appearances and goals

John Beckram was an English professional footballer who played as a forward.

== Career ==
Born in Sunderland, Beckram played for Sheffield United and Bradford City. For Bradford City, he made 25 appearances in the Football League; he also made 1 FA Cup appearance.

== Sources ==
- Frost, Terry (1988). Bradford City A Complete Record 1903-1988. Breedon Books Sport. ISBN 0-907969-38-0.
