= Norman Winn =

English footballer

Personal information
- Full name: Norman Joseph Winn
- Date of birth: 24 August 1900
- Place of birth: Lancaster, England
- Date of death: 1972 (aged 71–72)
- Height: 5 ft 7 in (1.70 m)
- Position: Outside left

Senior career*
Years	Team	Apps	(Gls)
- Lancaster Town
- Morecambe
1921–1926	Bradford City	85	(10)
- Chorley
- Lancaster Town
- Morecambe
- * Club domestic league appearances and goals

Norman Joseph Winn (24 August 1900 – 1972) was an English footballer who was an outside left.

Born in Lancaster, Winn started his career with Lancaster Town and Morecambe. He signed for Bradford City from Morecambe in May 1921 in the summer before City's final season in Division One. He played 21 games, scoring two goals, in 1921–22 as City were relegated in 21st place. Winn played 38 games during the next three seasons but it was not until 1925–26 he scored again, when his eight goals ensured he was the club's top goal-scorer. He left by the start of the following season to join Chorley after ten goals from 85 league games at Valley Parade.
