= David Melville (footballer) =

Scottish footballer

Personal information
- Position: Defender

Senior career*
Years	Team	Apps	(Gls)
- Partick Thistle
1907–1909	Bradford City	7	(0)
- Stockport County
- * Club domestic league appearances and goals

David Melville was a Scottish professional footballer who played as a defender.

== Career ==
Melville joined Bradford City from Partick Thistle in August 1907. He made 7 league appearances for the club. He left the club in August 1909 to join Stockport County.

== Sources ==
- Frost, Terry (1988). Bradford City A Complete Record 1903-1988. Breedon Books Sport. ISBN 0-907969-38-0.
