= Wallace Smith (footballer) =

English footballer

Wally Smith
Personal information
- Full name: Wallace Smith
- Date of birth: 1881
- Place of birth: Coventry, England
- Date of death: July 1917 (aged 35–36)
- Place of death: Worksop, England
- Position: Striker

Senior career*
Years	Team	Apps	(Gls)
- Rothwell Town
- Kettering Town
1904–1905	Northampton Town		
1905–1909	Bradford City	112	(54)
1909	Leicester Fosse	5	(0)
1909–1912	Hull City	91	(32)
- * Club domestic league appearances and goals

Wallace Smith (1881 – July 1917), also known as Wally Smith, was an English footballer who played for six clubs during his career, including three league clubs.

Smith was born in Coventry in 1881. He moved to Northamptonshire with his family when he was five years old. He returned to West Yorkshire when he started his playing with Rothwell Town, where he was their leading goal-scorer. He moved on to Kettering Town where he continued to find the net, scoring 23 goals in his third and final season. He moved on to Southern League side Northampton Town in 1904 for one season.

He was then signed for £50 in March 1905 (equivalent to £5,062.11 in March 2024) by Bradford City. He scored the only goal on his debut in a 1–0 win over Leeds City on 2 September 1905, finishing the 1905–06 season as top goal-scorer with 20 goals, including a goal in the 5–0 victory against First Division Wolverhampton Wanderers in the FA Cup. He again topped the scoring charts for City the following season with 14 goals as City came fifth.

In 1907–08 he and Frank O'Rourke formed a lethal partnership to guide City to the Division Two title. Smith finished with 20 goals, one behind O'Rourke, including four against Chesterfield in an opening day 8–1 win. Smith struggled in Division One and he failed to find the net in 16 games, leaving in January 1909 for Leicester Fosse. His Leicester career lasted just six games as they finished bottom of Division One, with his former club staying up on goal average.

Instead he moved to Hull City for the start of the 1909–10 season, when they narrowly missed out on promotion. Smith was forced to retire through injury in 1912 and died in his Worksop home five years later.
