= William Wilson (defender) =

English footballer

Personal information
- Place of birth: South Shields, England
- Position: Right back

Senior career*
Years	Team	Apps	(Gls)
- South Shields
1900–1903	Newcastle United	4	(0)
1903–1905	Bradford City	58	(1)
Total		62	(1)
- * Club domestic league appearances and goals

William Wilson was an English professional footballer who played as a right back.

== Career ==
Born in South Shields, Wilson played for South Shields, Newcastle United and Bradford City. For Newcastle United, he made 4 appearances in the Football League. For Bradford City, he made 58 appearances in the Football League; he also made 5 FA Cup appearances.

== Sources ==
- Frost, Terry (1988). Bradford City A Complete Record 1903-1988. Breedon Books Sport. ISBN 0-907969-38-0.
