= Arthur Seymour (footballer) =

English footballer

Personal information
- Place of birth: South Shields, England
- Position: Goalkeeper

Senior career*
Years	Team	Apps	(Gls)
- Hebburn Argyle
- Barnsley
1903–1904	Bradford City	34	(0)
Total		34	(0)
- * Club domestic league appearances and goals

Arthur Seymour was an English professional footballer who played as a goalkeeper.

== Career ==
Born in South Shields, Seymour spent his early career with Hebburn Argyle and Barnsley. He signed for Bradford City in July 1903, making 34 league and 4 FA Cup appearances for the club, before being released in 1904. He played in Bradford City's first ever match, a 0–2 league defeat away at Grimsby Town on 1 September 1903.

== Sources ==
- Frost, Terry (1988). Bradford City A Complete Record 1903-1988. Breedon Books Sport. ISBN 0-907969-38-0.
