= George Handley (footballer, born 1886) =

English footballer

Personal information
- Full name: George Albert Handley
- Date of birth: 1886
- Place of birth: Totley, Sheffield, England
- Date of death: 1952 (aged 65–66)
- Place of death: Bradford, England
- Height: 5 ft 8 in (1.73 m)
- Position: Winger

Senior career*
Years	Team	Apps	(Gls)
1902–1905	Hallam		
1905–1906	Chesterfield Town	25	(4)
1906–1911	Bradford City	86	(29)
1911–1912	Southampton	24	(2)
1912–1913	Goole Town		
1913–1914	Bradford City	1	(1)
1914–1919	Barrow		
1918–1919	→ Sheffield United (guest)		
1919–1922	Bradford City	17	(1)

Managerial career
- 1912–1913: Goole Town
- 1922: Brühl (coach)
- * Club domestic league appearances and goals

George Albert Handley (1886–1952) was an English professional footballer who played most of his career as a winger with Bradford City.

Born in Totley, Sheffield, he began his professional career with Chesterfield Town before moving to Bradford in 1906. After five years at Bradford, Handley left for Southampton in 1911 but his stay was only a brief one as he moved on to become player-manager of Goole Town in 1912. He re-joined Bradford in 1913 but was released at the end of the season and signed for Barrow with whom he remained for the duration of World War I, occasionally guesting for his home town club Sheffield United. After the war Handley returned to Bradford for a third spell, ending his playing career with the club, and later spent some time as coach of Swiss side Brühl.

== Playing career ==
As a child, Handley represented Sheffield Schools four times in the annual matches against London Schools. Handley started his professional career at the age of 17 with Hallam before moving to Chesterfield in January 1905. After two seasons with Chesterfield he joined Bradford City for the first time in October 1906 for a fee of £250.

Handley was a prolific scorer at Bradford, and after making his debut on 27 October 1906 in a 2–1 victory over Glossop North End, he played another 27 games in his first season scoring ten goals. In the 1907–08 season Handley scored 16 goals—a club record for a winger—from 37 games helping City to the Second Division championship. He struggled to repeat this form in the First Division and by 1911 Handley had fallen out of favour after making just 21 appearances in three seasons since promotion. His availability attracted the attention of Southampton's new manager George Swift, whom Handley had first met while at Chesterfield. Swift was Southampton's first appointment as manager and promptly embarked on a spending spree, signing 11 players in six weeks, including Handley.

Having joined Southampton in May 1911, Handley was immediately drafted into the first team on the left-wing, making his debut on 2 September 1911 at home to Millwall. Described as "an orthodox player, who depended on team-mates to create openings" he was, however, one of Swift's better signings. After Swift was dismissed at the end of the season, Handley left The Dell and took up a post of player-manager with Goole Town in April 1912.

In December 1913 he returned to Bradford City where he made just one appearance, before signing for Barrow just prior to the outbreak of the First World War. During the war, Handley joined the Royal Flying Corps, and made occasional guest appearances for Sheffield United, and Stoke, (playing twice in 1915–16), before returning to Bradford City after the cessation of hostilities. After two more seasons with City, Handley moved to Switzerland to take up coaching positions with Brühl in April 1922.

== Later life ==
Handley returned to the armed services after leaving Switzerland and was reported as being stationed at Coal Aston Airfield at the end of 1922.

== Career statistics ==
Appearances and goals by club, season and competition
Club	Season	League			FA Cup		Total	
Club	Season	Division	Apps	Goals	Apps	Goals	Apps	Goals
Chesterfield Town	1904–05	Second Division	7	2	0	0	7	2
Chesterfield Town	1905–06	Second Division	9	1	2	0	11	1
Chesterfield Town	1906–07	Second Division	9	1	0	0	9	1
Chesterfield Town	Total		25	4	2	0	27	4
Bradford City	1906–07	Second Division	28	10	3	0	31	10
Bradford City	1907–08	Second Division	37	16	2	1	39	17
Bradford City	1908–09	First Division	8	3	1	0	9	3
Bradford City	1909–10	First Division	1	0	0	0	1	0
Bradford City	1910–11	First Division	12	0	0	0	12	0
Bradford City	1913–14	First Division	1	0	0	0	1	0
Bradford City	1919–20	First Division	13	1	0	0	13	1
Bradford City	1920–21	First Division	3	0	1	0	4	0
Bradford City	Total		103	30	7	1	110	31
Career total			128	34	9	1	137	35

== Honours ==
Bradford City

- Second Division championship: 1907–08
