= Alf Jeffries (footballer, born 1914) =

English footballer

Personal information
- Full name: Alfred Jeffries
- Date of birth: 27 September 1915
- Place of birth: Bishop Auckland, England
- Date of death: 2004 (aged 88–89)
- Height: 5 ft 6 in (1.68 m)
- Position: Outside right

Senior career*
Years	Team	Apps	(Gls)
- Leasingthorne Colliery Welfare
- Willington
1934–1935	Norwich City	0	(0)
1935–1937	Bradford City	55	(11)
1937–1939	Derby County	15	(1)
1939–1943	Sheffield United	0	(0)
- Basingstoke Town
- * Club domestic league appearances and goals

Alfred Jeffries (27 September 1915 – 2004) was an English professional footballer who played as an outside right. His date of birth is listed as either 21 September 1914 or 27 September 1915.

== Career ==
Born in Bishop Auckland, Jeffries was a talented winger who began his career at Norwich City, where opportunities were limited. After moving to Bradford City, he made 55 appearances in the Football League (scoring 11 goals), and 4 appearances in the FA Cup (scoring once). Jeffries then signed for Derby County, where he again found opportunities limited, before joining Sheffield United for £3,200 in June 1939.

Jeffries played all 3 matches for Sheffield United in the ill-fated 1939–40 season, helping them to two wins and a draw before the season was abandoned due to the outbreak of World War II. Despite the war meaning he did not play any more Football League matches for the Blades, Jeffries did make 48 wartime appearances, scoring 10 goals. After the war, Jeffries joined Basingstoke Town.

== Sources ==
- Frost, Terry (1988). Bradford City A Complete Record 1903-1988. Breedon Books Sport. ISBN 0-907969-38-0.
