= John R. Graham (footballer) =

English footballer

John Graham
Personal information
- Place of birth: Newcastle, England
- Position: Forward

Senior career*
Years	Team	Apps	(Gls)
1901–1903	Newcastle United	6	(0)
1903–1905	Bradford City	54	(8)
Total		60	(8)
- * Club domestic league appearances and goals

John R. Graham was an English professional footballer who played as a forward.

== Career ==
Born in Newcastle, Graham played for Newcastle United and Bradford City. For Bradford City, he made 54 appearances in the Football League; he also made 5 FA Cup appearances.

== Sources ==
- Frost, Terry (1988). Bradford City A Complete Record 1903-1988. Breedon Books Sport. ISBN 0-907969-38-0.
