= Harry Hanger =

English footballer

Personal information
- Full name: Harold Hanger
- Date of birth: 1886
- Place of birth: Kettering, England
- Date of death: 23 March 1918 (aged 31–32)
- Place of death: Somme, France
- Position: Left half

Senior career*
Years	Team	Apps	(Gls)
1902–1903	Kettering Town		
1903–1905	Northampton Town		
1905–1906	Kettering Town		
1906–1909	Bradford City	73	(3)
1909	→ Kettering Town (loan)		
1909–1915	Crystal Palace	168	(7)
Total		241	(10)

International career
	Southern League XI	1	
- * Club domestic league appearances and goals

Harold Hanger (1886 – 23 March 1918) was an English professional footballer who played as a centre half.

== Career ==
Hanger was born in Kettering, Northamptonshire, and began his career with Kettering Town. He went on to play for Bradford City, Crystal Palace and Northampton Town.

For Bradford City, he made 73 appearances in the Football League; he also made six FA Cup appearances.

For Crystal Palace, he made 168 appearances in the Southern League; he also made 10 FA Cup appearances.

Hanger left Crystal Palace to undertake military service in World War I. He served as a private in the 5th Royal Irish Lancers and was killed in action in France on 23 March 1918. He is commemorated on the Pozières Memorial.

== Personal life ==
Hanger's brother Percy was also a footballer.

== Sources ==
- Frost, Terry (1988). Bradford City A Complete Record 1903–1988. Breedon Books. ISBN 0-907969-38-0.
- Harris, Clive; Whippy, Julian (2008). The Greater Game: Sporting Icons Who Fell in The Great War. Pen & Sword Military. ISBN 9781844157624.
- King, Ian (2012). Crystal Palace: The Complete Record 1905–2011. Derby Books. ISBN 978-1-78091-221-9.
- Purkiss, Mike; Sands, Nigel (1989). Crystal Palace: A Complete Record 1905–1989. Breedon Books. ISBN 0907969542.
