= Walter Bruce (English footballer) =

English footballer

Personal information
- Date of birth: 1915
- Place of birth: Sunderland, England
- Height: 5 ft 8 in (1.73 m)
- Position: Inside right

Senior career*
Years	Team	Apps	(Gls)
- Workington
1933–1937	Bradford City	76	(17)
- Swansea Town
- * Club domestic league appearances and goals

Walter Bruce (born 1915) was an English professional footballer who played as an inside right.

== Career ==
Born in Sunderland, Bruce played for Workington, Bradford City and Swansea Town. For Bradford City, he made 76 appearances in the Football League, scoring 17 goals; he also made 3 FA Cup appearances.

== Sources ==
- Frost, Terry (1988). Bradford City A Complete Record 1903-1988. Breedon Books Sport. ISBN 0-907969-38-0.
