= Thomas Drain =

Scottish footballer

Personal information
- Date of birth: 26th of June 1879
- Place of birth: Pollokshaws, Scotland
- Date of death: 19 September 1952
- Position: Forward

Senior career*
Years	Team	Apps	(Gls)
1899-1900	Drongan Juniors		(8)
1900 Trialist	Celtic		
1901	Ayr		
1902	Maybole		
1903–1904	Bradford City	32	(12)
1905	Leeds City	9	(3)
1906	Kilmarnock		
- Carlisle United
1908	Exeter City		
1909	Woolwich Arsenal	2	(0)
1910	Nithsdale Wanderers		
1911	Galston		
- * Club domestic league appearances and goals

Thomas Drain (born 26th of June 1879 Ayrshire) was a Scottish footballer who played in the Football League for Woolwich Arsenal, Bradford City and Leeds City. His son William Thomas Drain also had a strong professional football career in Scotland and Australia.
