= Jack Forrest (footballer, born 1878) =

Scottish footballer

Personal information
- Full name: John Forrest
- Date of birth: 1878
- Place of birth: Lanarkshire, Scotland
- Position: Forward

Senior career*
Years	Team	Apps	(Gls)
- Carluke Milton Rovers
1901–1902	Motherwell	19	(15)
1902–1903	Stoke	6	(3)
1903–1905	Bradford City	53	(18)
1906–1907	Hamilton Academical	27	(6)
1907–1908	Ayr	17	(10)
1908–1908	Vale of Leven	10	(4)
Total		132	(56)
- * Club domestic league appearances and goals

John Forrest (born 1878) was a Scottish footballer who played in the Football League for Bradford City and Stoke as a forward.

== Career ==
Forrest was born in Lanarkshire and played for Carluke Milton Rovers and Motherwell before being signed by Stoke in 1902 after being highly recommended by the club's Scotland-based scouts. He began his Stoke career brilliantly, scoring twice on his debut in a 3–0 win over Staffordshire rivals Wolverhampton Wanderers, and scored his third against Liverpool two matches later. However, after the first month at the club he began to feel homesick and was allowed to return to Scotland. He played once in November and then in April before the board had enough of Forrest and told him to leave.

In May 1903 he joined the newly formed league club Bradford City taking his place in the club's first line-up against Grimsby Town on 1 September 1903. He spent a little over two seasons at Bradford, scoring 18 goals in 53 league games and being the club's top goalscorer in 1904–05. He also scored six goals from just five FA Cup games including four in a 9–0 win over Sunderland West End on 10 December 1905.

In January 1906 he left to join Hamilton Academical, where his 18-month spell included scoring a brace to eliminate local rivals and former employers Motherwell from the Scottish Cup on his debut, and later some minor silverware with a Lanarkshire Cup win. He then moved on to Ayr followed by Vale of Leven.

== Career statistics ==
Appearances and goals by club, season and competition
Club	Season	League			FA Cup		Total	
Club	Season	Division	Apps	Goals	Apps	Goals	Apps	Goals
Stoke	1902–03	First Division	6	3	0	0	6	3
Bradford City	1903–04	Second Division	27	5	3	2	30	7
Bradford City	1904–05	Second Division	23	13	2	4	25	17
Bradford City	1905–06	Second Division	3	0	0	0	3	0
Bradford City	Total		53	18	5	6	58	24
Career total			59	21	5	6	64	27
