= Frank O'Rourke (Scottish footballer) =

Scottish footballer

Personal information
- Full name: Francis O'Rourke
- Date of birth: 5 December 1876
- Place of birth: Cleland, Scotland
- Date of death: 24 December 1954 (aged 78)
- Place of death: Bargeddie, Scotland
- Position: Centre forward

Senior career*
Years	Team	Apps	(Gls)
- Kirkwood Juniors
1899–1907	Airdrieonians	157	(50)
1907–1922	Bradford City	192	(88)
Total		349	(138)

International career
1907	Scotland	1	(1)
- * Club domestic league appearances and goals

Francis O'Rourke (5 December 1876 – 24 December 1954) was a Scottish international footballer who played as a centre forward in Scotland for Airdrieonians and in England for Bradford City.

== Career ==
Born in Lanarkshire to a Scottish mother and a father originally form County Tyrone who died in 1881, O'Rourke started his career with Airdrieonians, where he spent eight years and won a Division Two title-winning medal in the 1902–03 season.

He won his one and only cap for Scotland on 16 March 1907, scoring against Ireland, before signing for Bradford City a month later (he had been playing at Valley Parade in a friendly for Airdrie, following which the City board woke him from his hotel room in Leeds to sign for them). He scored on his debut on 6 April 1907 in a 2–1 defeat to Nottingham Forest, two in his second game and a fourth goal in his third.

O'Rourke finished as top goalscorer with 21 goals in 1907–08, one ahead of strike partner Wallace Smith, including four in a 7–1 victory over Gainsborough Trinity as City won the Second Division title. He was again top goal-scorer the following season with 19 goals as he played in every game for City, who stayed up on goal average from Manchester City. He was again top goal-scorer in 1909–10 thanks to three goals in the FA Cup, although he was one goal behind Robert Whittingham in the league.

The club's league position of seventh was beaten in 1910–11 as City came fifth, the club's highest league finish, with O'Rourke scoring 13 goals. The season also saw City win its only piece of major silverware in its history when it defeated Newcastle United in the 1911 FA Cup Final. O'Rourke scored just once in the run to the final when he netted the first goal in the 3–0 semi-final victory over Blackburn Rovers. The first game of the final had finished 0–0 with the only goal of the replay being scored by captain Jimmy Speirs. Some sources has credited the goal to O'Rourke, but he denied touching the ball.

O'Rourke was now 32 and his games and goals dried up, as he made just 46 more appearances in the final four seasons before the First World War, netting 11 goals. His final tally of 88 goals from 192 league appearances stood as a club record for 69 years until Bobby Campbell broke it in October 1984 on his way to 121 club league goals.

His playing contract was terminated in September 1922, though his last league game came in 1914. He remained as first-team trainer until 1926 when he retired to Scotland, where he died in Bargeddie on Christmas Eve 1954, aged 77.

=== International goals ===
#	Date	Venue	Opponent	Score	Result	Competition
1.	March 4, 1907	Celtic Park, Glasgow, Scotland	Ireland	3–0	Win	British Home Championship

== Honours ==
Airdrieonians

- Scottish Division Two: 1902–03

Bradford City

- Football League Second Division: 1907–08
- FA Cup: 1911
