= Jimmy Vallance =

Scottish footballer

Personal information
- Position: Forward

Senior career*
Years	Team	Apps	(Gls)
- Postal Athletic
- Glasgow Civil Service
1906–1907	Queen's Park	13	(1)
1907–1910	Bradford City	3	(0)
- St Johnstone
- Beith
Total		16+	(1+)
- * Club domestic league appearances and goals

James Vallance was a Scottish professional footballer who played as a forward.

== Career ==
Vallance spent his early career with Postal Athletic, Glasgow Civil Service and Queen's Park. At Queen's Park he made 13 league and 1 Cup appearances, scoring once in the league. He signed for Bradford City from Queen's Park in November 1907, making 3 league appearances for the club, before leaving in November 1910. He later played for St Johnstone and Beith.

== Sources ==
- Frost, Terry (1988). Bradford City A Complete Record 1903-1988. Breedon Books Sport. ISBN 0-907969-38-0.
