= William Robb (footballer, born 1927) =

Scottish footballer (1927–2002)

Willie Robb
Personal information
- Full name: William Lawson Robb
- Date of birth: 23 December 1927
- Place of birth: Cambuslang, Scotland
- Date of death: 18 May 2002 (aged 74)
- Place of death: Glasgow, Scotland
- Position: Wing half

Youth career
- –: Cambuslang Rangers

Senior career*
Years	Team	Apps	(Gls)
1949–1950	Aberdeen	4	(0)
1950–1951	Leyton Orient	5	(0)
1951–1954	Albion Rovers	77	(6)
1954–1958	Bradford City	127	(4)
1958	Rutherglen Glencairn	?	(?)
Total		213	(10)
- * Club domestic league appearances and goals

William Lawson Robb (23 December 1927 – 18 May 2002) was a Scottish professional footballer who played as a wing half. Active between 1949 and 1958, Robb made over 200 appearances in the Scottish and English League systems.

== Career ==
Born in Cambuslang, Robb played junior football with local side Cambuslang Rangers, before turning professional in 1949 with Aberdeen. Robb later played for Leyton Orient, Albion Rovers and Bradford City, before returning to junior football with Rutherglen Glencairn.
