= Jimmy McDonald (footballer, born 1883) =

Scottish footballer (1883–1924)

Personal information
- Full name: James Alexander McDonald
- Date of birth: 8 December 1883
- Place of birth: Peterhead, Scotland
- Date of death: August 1924 (aged 40)
- Positions: Left half; inside left

Senior career*
Years	Team	Apps	(Gls)
- Inverness Citadel
- Inverness Thistle
–1903	Aberdeen Favourites		
1903–1907	St Bernard's	46	(12)
1907–1920	Bradford City	202	(25)
1920–1921	Raith Rovers	15	(2)
1921–1922	Wakefield City		
1922–1923	Keighley Parkwood		
- * Club domestic league appearances and goals

James Alexander McDonald (8 December 1883 – August 1924) was a Scottish professional footballer who played as a forward.

== Career ==
McDonald moved from St Bernard's to Bradford City in April 1907, representing them in the 1911 FA Cup Final, and captaining the team before World War I. In 1920, he signed for Raith Rovers.

== Personal life ==
McDonald served as a gunner in the Royal Field Artillery during the First World War.
