= George Robinson (footballer, born 1878) =

English footballer

Personal information
- Full name: George Henry Robinson
- Date of birth: 1878
- Place of birth: Basford, England
- Date of death: March 1945 (aged 67)
- Place of death: Bradford, England
- Position: Half back

Youth career
- Notts Jardines
- Newark

Senior career*
Years	Team	Apps	(Gls)
1899–1903	Nottingham Forest	63	(1)
1903–1915	Bradford City	343	(16)
Total		406	(17)
- * Club domestic league appearances and goals

George Henry Robinson (1878 – March 1945) was an English professional footballer who played as a half back for Nottingham Forest and Bradford City.

== Career ==
Born in Basford, Robinson began his professional career with Nottingham Forest, having previously played for Notts Jardines and Newark.

He signed for Bradford City in June 1903. He played in City's first ever Football League game, against Grimsby. He was City's captain as they won the 1907–08 Second Division title, and he also played as they won the FA Cup in 1911, serving as vice-captain.

He received two benefit matches, in 1909 (alongside Jimmy Millar) and in 1914. During World War One he made one wartime appearance. When he retired from playing in 1915 he had made a then club record 343 league appearances for City. During his career he had also made a then-record 69 consecutive league appearances; that record was broken by Bruce Stowell in 1972. After the War he became a trainer at City, until June 1922.

He died in March 1945, aged 67.

== Honours ==
Bradford City

- 1907–08 Football League Second Division champions
- 1911 FA Cup Final

== Sources ==
- Frost, Terry (1988). Bradford City A Complete Record 1903-1988. Breedon Books Sport. ISBN 0-907969-38-0.
- Joyce, Michael (2012) [2002]. Football League Players' Records 1888 to 1939. Soccerdata. ISBN 978-1-905891-61-0.
