= Fred Farren =

English footballer

Personal information
- Position: Left back

Senior career*
Years	Team	Apps	(Gls)
- Kettering Town
1906–1912	Bradford City	87	(0)
- Halifax Town
- * Club domestic league appearances and goals

Fred W. Farren was an English professional footballer who played as a left back.

== Career ==
Farren played for Kettering Town, Bradford City and Halifax Town. For Bradford City, he made 87 appearances in the Football League; he also made 8 FA Cup appearances.

== Sources ==
- Frost, Terry (1988). Bradford City A Complete Record 1903-1988. Breedon Books Sport. ISBN 0-907969-38-0.
