= Jimmy McLean (footballer, born 1881) =

Scottish footballer

Personal information
- Date of birth: 1881
- Place of birth: Scotland
- Position: Full back

Senior career*
Years	Team	Apps	(Gls)
	Clachnacuddin	?	(?)
1903–1905	Bradford City	29	(0)
1905–1906	Clapton Orient	0	(0)
1906–1908	Bradford City	29	(0)
1908–1910	Burnley	41	(0)
- * Club domestic league appearances and goals

James T. McLean (1881–?) was a Scottish professional footballer who played as a full back.
