= Jack Wilkie (footballer, born 1876) =

Scottish footballer

Personal information
- Full name: John Wilkie
- Date of birth: 1876
- Place of birth: Govan, Scotland
- Position: Inside forward

Youth career
- Summertown Athletic

Senior career*
Years	Team	Apps	(Gls)
1894–1895	Partick Thistle	21	(9)
1895–1898	Blackburn Rovers	75	(17)
1898–1902	Rangers	28	(11)
1900–1901	→ Middlesbrough (loan)	28	(8)
1903–1905	Partick Thistle	31	(11)
1905–1906	Hibernian	7	(2)
1906	→ Ayr Parkhouse (loan)		
Total		190	(58)
- * Club domestic league appearances and goals

John Wilkie was a Scottish footballer who played in the Football League for Blackburn Rovers and Middlesbrough.

He began his career with Partick Thistle, and returned to the club eight years later for a second spell. He played alongside former Jags left-wing teammate John Campbell at Blackburn and Rangers, and would do so again briefly at Hibernian.

At Rangers, he had a minor role in the club's perfect season of 1898–99 (18 league wins from 18 matches) and played more often as they retained the SFL title in 1899–1900, and in a third championship season in 1901–02. He also claimed Glasgow Cup medals in the latter two seasons.

Wilkie was selected for the Home Scots v Anglo-Scots international trial match in 1898 while with Blackburn, and again in 1904 while with Partick, but this did not lead to a cap for Scotland on either occasion.
