= Peter O'Rourke (footballer) =

Scottish footballer and manager

Personal information
- Full name: Peter O'Rourke
- Date of birth: 1 June 1873
- Place of birth: Newmains, Scotland
- Date of death: 10 January 1956 (aged 82)
- Place of death: Bradford, England
- Position: Centre half

Senior career*
Years	Team	Apps	(Gls)
- Mossend Celtic
1895–1897	Celtic	10	(0)
1897–1899	Burnley		
1899–1900	Lincoln City		
1900–1901	Third Lanark	0	(0)
1901–1903	Chesterfield		
1903–1905	Bradford City	49	(1)

Managerial career
- 1905–1921: Bradford City
- 1921–1922: Pontypridd
- 1922–1923: Dundee Hibernian
- 1924–1925: Bradford Park Avenue
- 1928–1930: Bradford City
- 1930–1932: Walsall
- 1932–1933: Llanelli
- * Club domestic league appearances and goals

Peter O'Rourke (1 June 1873 – 10 January 1956) was a Scottish football player and manager. In two spells as manager of Bradford City, he won the FA Cup in 1911 as well as two league titles, the Football League Second Division in 1908 and the Third Division North in 1929.

== Career ==
O'Rourke was a centre half who played for Celtic, Burnley, Lincoln City, Third Lanark and Chesterfield before his final playing days at Bradford City. He became player-manager in 1905 following the departure of Robert Campbell while he was still captain. He was given the job permanently and in December 1905 played his final game in an FA Cup tie against Darlington.

He led the Bantams to the Second Division championship in 1908. Three years later, O'Rourke clinched the FA Cup with Bradford in 1911, beating Newcastle United 1–0 in a replay. His son, Francis, died in Newfoundland in October 1919, affecting him deeply, and in June 1921, due to ill health, O'Rourke retired from the game.

He came back with Welsh side Pontypridd in 1922 for five months. In December of that year, O'Rourke joined Dundee Hibernian, who were then a non-league club, but stayed for only three months, resigning after lacking financial support. His next managerial job was with Bradford Park Avenue from 1924 to 1925. He spent just ten months at Park Avenue but signed another son, Peter, who scored twice on his debut against Durham City.

He returned to Bradford City in 1928, winning the Third Division North the following year. After leaving Bradford for the second time in 1930, he moved to Walsall, before a final managerial spell with Llanelli. He retired in July 1933.

After retiring, O'Rourke returned to Bradford living in Burlington Terrace next to City's Valley Parade ground until he died in January 1956 at the age of 82.

== Honours ==
=== Manager ===
Bradford City

- Football League Second Division: 1907–08
- FA Cup: 1910–11
- Football League Third Division North: 1928–29
