= List of Bradford City A.F.C. seasons =

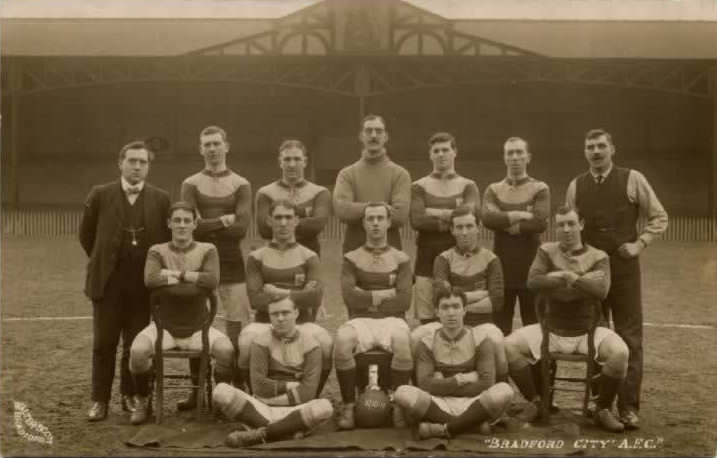
The Bradford City side that won the 1911 FA Cup—the only major honour to be won by the club

Bradford City Association Football Club were formed in 1903 and were elected into the Second Division before they had even played a game. Bradford City and Chelsea, in 1905, remain the only teams to be elected into the league before playing a competitive fixture. The club were promoted to the First Division when they won the Second Division title in 1907–08. In 1910–11 the club recorded their highest league position of fifth and also won their only major honour when captain Jimmy Speirs lifted the FA Cup after he scored the only goal to defeat Newcastle United 1–0 in the final replay. Bradford City's honours also include the Third Division North title in 1928–29 and the Third Division crown in 1984–85, as well as the Third Division North Challenge Cup in 1938–39.

Bradford City have spent two seasons in the Premier League. In 1999–2000, they avoided relegation with just 36 points, then a record low to stay up, after defeating Liverpool 1–0 in the final game with a headed goal from David Wetherall. The club have won promotion in a total of eight seasons and been relegated on ten occasions; three relegations in the previous seven seasons meant the 2007–08 season was their first in the fourth tier in 26 years. Bradford City have also played in European competition when they took one of England's two places in the Intertoto Cup in 2000. They defeated FK Atlantas and RKC Waalwijk before being knocked out by FC Zenit Saint Petersburg in the semi-finals.

== Seasons ==
Season	League									FA Cup	EFL Cup^{[A]}	Europe / Other		Top scorer^{[B]}	
Season	Division	P	W	D	L	F	A	Pts	Pos	FA Cup	EFL Cup^{[A]}	Europe / Other		Top scorer^{[B]}	
1903–04	Div 2^{[C]}	34	12	7	15	45	59	31	10th	4Q				Johnny McMillan†	16
1904–05	Div 2	34	12	8	14	45	49	32	8th	IR				Jack Forrest†	17
1905–06	Div 2	38	13	8	17	46	60	34	11th	R3				Wallace Smith†	24
1906–07	Div 2	38	21	5	12	70	53	47	5th	R3				Wallace Smith	14
1907–08	Div 2	38	24	6	8	90	42	54	1st	R1				Frank O'Rourke	21
1908–09	Div 1	38	12	10	16	47	47	34	18th	R3				Frank O'Rourke	19
1909–10	Div 1	38	17	8	13	64	47	42	7th	R2				Frank O'Rourke	23
1910–11	Div 1	38	20	5	13	51	42	45	5th	W				Frank O'Rourke	14
1911–12	Div 1	38	15	8	15	46	50	38	11th	QF				Harold Walden	14
1912–13	Div 1	38	12	11	15	50	60	35	13th	R1				Oscar Fox	13
1913–14	Div 1	38	12	14	12	40	40	38	9th	R2				Dicky Bond	10
1914–15	Div 1	38	13	14	11	55	49	40	10th	QF				Oscar Fox	17
1915–19	No competitive football was played between 1915 and 1919 because of the First World War.														
1919–20	Div 1	42	14	11	17	54	63	39	15th	QF				Dicky Bond; Jimmy McIlvenny	13
1920–21	Div 1	42	12	15	15	61	63	39	15th	R2				Billy Hibbert	13
1921–22	Div 1	42	11	10	21	48	72	32	21st	R2				Billy Hibbert	15
1922–23	Div 2	42	12	13	17	41	45	37	15th	R1				Cecil Kilborn; Fred Rhodes; Arthur Rigby	5
1923–24	Div 2	42	11	15	16	35	48	37	18th	R1				Fred Rhodes	7
1924–25	Div 2	42	13	12	17	37	50	38	16th	R3				Reuben Butler	15
1925–26	Div 2	42	13	10	19	47	66	36	16th	R3				Norman Winn	8
1926–27	Div 2	42	7	9	26	50	88	23	22nd	R3				Ralph Burkinshaw; Charlie Moore	8
1927–28	Div 3N	42	18	12	12	85	60	48	6th	R2				Charlie Moore	17
1928–29	Div 3N	42	27	9	6	128	43	63	1st	R4				Albert Whitehurst†	24
1929–30	Div 2	42	12	12	18	60	77	36	18th	R5				Sandy Cochrane	21
1930–31	Div 2	42	17	10	15	61	63	44	10th	R4				John Hallows	19
1931–32	Div 2	42	16	13	13	80	61	45	7th	R3				John Hallows	21
1932–33	Div 2	42	14	13	15	65	61	41	11th	R3				Stan Alexander	16
1933–34	Div 2	42	20	6	16	73	67	46	6th	R3				Joe Spence†	24
1934–35	Div 2	42	12	8	22	50	68	32	20th	R4				Harry Adamson	10
1935–36	Div 2	42	15	13	14	55	65	43	12th	R5				Harry Travis	18
1936–37	Div 2	42	9	12	21	54	94	30	21st	R3				George Murphy	11
1937–38	Div 3N	42	14	10	18	66	69	38	14th	R3		Third Division North Challenge Cup^{[D]}	RU	Jack Deakin†	27
1938–39	Div 3N	42	22	8	12	89	56	52	3rd	R1		Third Division North Challenge Cup	W	Jack Deakin†	29
1939–40^{[E]}	Div 3N	3	0	1	2	3	6	1	21st						
1939–45	No competitive football was played between 1939 and 1945 because of the Second World War.														
1945–46										R1^{[F]}				George Murphy	2
1946–47	Div 3N	42	20	10	12	62	47	50	5th	R1				George Murphy	15
1947–48	Div 3N	42	15	10	17	65	66	40	14th	R2				John Neilson	12
1948–49	Div 3N	42	10	9	23	48	77	29	22nd^{[G]}	R2				Jimmy Brown	12
1949–50	Div 3N	42	12	8	22	61	76	32	19th	R2				Billy Price	16
1950–51	Div 3N	46	21	10	15	90	63	52	7th	R1				Billy Price	16
1951–52	Div 3N	46	16	10	20	61	68	42	15th	R2				Whelan Ward	12
1952–53	Div 3N	46	14	18	14	75	80	46	16th	R2				Eddie Carr	20
1953–54	Div 3N	46	22	9	15	60	55	53	5th	R1				Abe Rosenthal	15
1954–55	Div 3N	46	13	10	23	47	55	36	21st	R3				Billy Tunnicliffe	7
1955–56	Div 3N	46	18	13	15	78	64	49	8th	R2				Bobby Webb	19
1956–57	Div 3N	46	22	8	16	78	68	52	9th	R1				Les Samuels	19
1957–58	Div 3N	46	21	15	10	73	49	57	3rd	R3				David Jackson	14
1958–59	Div 3^{[H]}	46	18	11	17	84	76	47	11th	R4				John McCole†	34
1959–60	Div 3	46	15	12	19	66	74	42	19th	R5				Derek Stokes†	35
1960–61	Div 3	46	11	14	21	65	87	36	22nd	R2	R3			David Layne	10
1961–62^{[I]}	Div 4	44	21	9	14	94	86	51	5th	R3	R1			David Layne†	36^{[J]}
1962–63	Div 4	46	11	10	25	64	93	32	23rd^{[G]}	R3	R1			Peter Bircumshaw; Stan Harland	11
1963–64	Div 4	46	25	6	15	76	62	56	5th	R1	R1			Rodney Green	31
1964–65	Div 4	46	12	8	26	70	88	32	19th	R1	QF			Tom Brownlee	14
1965–66	Div 4	46	12	13	21	63	94	37	23rd^{[G]}	R1	R1			Ken Leek	11
1966–67	Div 4	46	19	10	17	74	62	48	11th	R1	R1			John Hall	18
1967–68	Div 4	46	23	11	12	72	51	57	5th	R2	R1			Bruce Bannister	16
1968–69	Div 4	46	18	20	8	65	46	56	4th	R1	R2			Bobby Ham	20
1969–70	Div 3	46	17	12	17	57	50	46	10th	R3	R4			Bobby Ham	19
1970–71	Div 3	46	13	14	19	49	62	40	19th	R2	R1			Bruce Bannister	19
1971–72	Div 3	46	11	10	25	45	77	32	24th	R1	R1			Peter Middleton	11
1972–73	Div 4	46	16	11	19	61	65	43	16th	R4	R1			Allan Gilliver	20
1973–74	Div 4	46	17	14	15	58	52	48	8th	R4	R1			Gerry Ingram	18
1974–75	Div 4	46	17	13	16	56	51	47	10th	R1	R2			Bobby Ham	14
1975–76	Div 4	46	12	17	17	63	65	41	17th	QF	R1			Joe Cooke	24
1976–77	Div 4	46	23	13	10	78	51	59	4th	R1	R2			Joe Cooke	18
1977–78	Div 3	46	12	10	24	56	86	34	22nd	R1	R1			Don Hutchins; Bernie Wright	10
1978–79	Div 4	46	17	9	20	62	68	43	15th	R2	R2			David McNiven	15
1979–80	Div 4	46	24	12	10	77	50	60	5th	R3	R2			David McNiven	18
1980–81	Div 4	46	14	16	16	53	60	44	14th	R1	R2			Bobby Campbell	22
1981–82	Div 4	46	26	13	7	88	45	91^{[K]}	2nd	R1	R3	Football League Group Cup^{[L]}	QF	Bobby Campbell	29
1982–83	Div 3	46	16	13	17	68	69	61	12th	R3	R3	Football League Group Cup	QF	Bobby Campbell	33
1983–84	Div 3	46	20	11	15	73	65	71	7th	R1	R1	Football League Trophy^{[M]}	R2	John Hawley	23
1984–85	Div 3^{[N]}	46	28	10	8	77	45	94	1st	R3	R2	Football League Trophy	R2	Bobby Campbell	26
1985–86	Div 2	46	16	6	20	51	63	54	13th	R3	R2	Full Members Cup^{[O]}	R1	Greg Abbott; John Hendrie	13
1986–87	Div 2	46	15	10	17	62	62	55	10th	R4	R4	Full Members Cup	QF	John Hendrie	17
1987–88	Div 2	46	22	11	11	74	54	77	4th^{[P]}	R5	QF	Full Members Cup	SF	Ron Futcher	19
1988–89	Div 2	46	13	17	16	52	59	56	14th	R4	QF	Full Members Cup	R2	Mark Leonard	12
1989–90	Div 2	46	9	14	23	44	68	41	23rd	R3	R2	Full Members Cup	R1	Mark Leonard; Jimmy Quinn	7
1990–91	Div 3	46	20	10	16	62	54	70	8th	R1	R3	Football League Trophy	QF	Sean McCarthy	16
1991–92	Div 3	46	13	19	14	62	61	58	16th	R2	R2	Football League Trophy	PR	Sean McCarthy	17
1992–93	Div 2^{[Q]}	46	18	14	14	69	67	68	10th	R2	R1	Football League Trophy	QF/N	Sean McCarthy	25
1993–94	Div 2	46	19	13	14	61	53	70	7th	R1	R2	Football League Trophy	R2	Sean McCarthy	21
1994–95	Div 2	46	16	12	18	57	64	60	14th	R1	R2	Football League Trophy	R2	Paul Jewell	14
1995–96	Div 2	46	22	7	17	71	69	73	6th^{[R]}	R3	R3	Football League Trophy	R1	Paul Showler	14
1996–97	Div 1	46	12	12	22	47	72	48	21st	R5	R1			Ole Bjørn Sundgot; Chris Waddle	6
1997–98	Div 1	46	14	15	17	46	59	57	13th	R3	R1			Edinho; Robert Steiner	11
1998–99	Div 1	46	26	9	11	82	47	87	2nd	R4	R3			Lee Mills	24
1999–2000	Prem	38	9	9	20	38	68	36	17th	R4	R3			Dean Windass	10
2000–01	Prem	38	5	11	22	30	70	26	20th	R3	R3	UEFA Intertoto Cup	SF	Dean Windass	8
2001–02	Div 1	46	15	10	21	69	76	55	15th	R3	R3			Eoin Jess	14
2002–03	Div 1	46	14	10	22	51	73	52	19th	R3	R1			Andy Gray	15
2003–04	Div 1	46	10	6	30	38	69	36	23rd	R3	R1			Michael Branch; Andy Gray; Dean Windass	6
2004–05	Lge 1^{[S]}	46	17	14	15	64	62	65	11th	R1	R1	Football League Trophy	R1	Dean Windass	28
2005–06	Lge 1	46	14	19	13	51	49	61	11th	R2	R2	Football League Trophy	R3	Dean Windass	20
2006–07	Lge 1	46	11	14	21	47	65	47	22nd	R2	R1	Football League Trophy	R1	Dean Windass	12
2007–08	Lge 2	46	17	11	18	63	61	62	10th	R2	R1	Football League Trophy	R1	Peter Thorne	15
2008–09	Lge 2	46	18	13	15	66	55	67	9th	R2	R1	Football League Trophy	R1	Peter Thorne	17
2009–10	Lge 2	46	16	14	16	59	62	62	14th	R1	R1	Football League Trophy	SF/N	James Hanson	13
2010–11	Lge 2	46	15	7	24	43	68	52	18th	R1	R2	Football League Trophy	R2	Dave Syers	10
2011–12	Lge 2	46	12	14	20	54	59	50	18th	R3	R1	Football League Trophy	SF/N	James Hanson	14
2012–13	Lge 2	46	18	15	13	63	52	69	7th^{[T]}	R2	RU^{[U]}	Football League Trophy	SF/N	Nahki Wells	18
2013–14	Lge 1	46	14	17	15	57	54	59	11th	R1	R1	Football League Trophy	R1	Nahki Wells	15
2014–15	Lge 1	46	17	14	15	55	55	65	7th	QF	R3	Football League Trophy	R1	Billy Clarke	14
2015–16	Lge 1	46	23	11	12	55	40	80	5th^{[V]}	R3	R1	Football League Trophy	R2	James Hanson	13
2016–17	Lge 1	46	20	19	7	62	43	79	5th^{[W]}	R1	R1	EFL Trophy	QF	Jordy Hiwula	12
2017–18	Lge 1	46	18	9	19	57	67	63	11th	R3	R1	EFL Trophy	R2	Charlie Wyke	15
2018–19	Lge 1	46	11	8	27	49	77	41	24th	R2	R1	EFL Trophy	GS	Eoin Doyle	11
2019–20	Lge 2	37	14	12	11	44	40	54	9th	R1	R1	EFL Trophy	GS	James Vaughan	11
2020–21	Lge 2	46	16	11	19	48	53	59	15th	R2	R2	EFL Trophy	GS	Andy Cook	8
2021–22	Lge 2	46	14	16	16	53	55	58	14th	R1	R1	EFL Trophy	GS	Andy Cook	12
2022–23	Lge 2	46	20	16	10	61	43	76	6th ^{[X]}	R1	R2	EFL Trophy	R32	Andy Cook	31
2023–24	Lge 2	46	19	12	15	61	59	69	9th	R1	R3	EFL Trophy	SF	Andy Cook	19
2024–25	Lge 2	46	22	12	12	64	45	78	3rd	R2	R1	EFL Trophy	SF	Andy Cook	15

== Key ==
- P = Played
- W = Games won
- D = Games drawn
- L = Games lost
- F = Goals for
- A = Goals against
- Pts = Points
- Pos = Final position
- Div 1 = Football League First Division
- Div 2 = Football League Second Division
- Div 3 = Football League Third Division
- Div 3N = Football League Third Division North
- Div 4 = Football League Fourth Division
- Prem = Premier League
- Champ = Football League Championship
- Lge 1 = Football League One
- Lge 2 = Football League Two
- PR = Preliminary Round
- 4Q = Fourth Qualifying Round
- IR = Intermediate Round
- R1 = Round 1
- R2 = Round 2
- R3 = Round 3
- R4 = Round 4
- R5 = Round 5
- R32 = Round of 32
- QF = Quarter-finals
- QF/N = Quarter-finals – Northern Section
- SF = Semi-finals
- SF/N = Semi-finals – Northern Section
- RU = Runners-up
- W = Winners

Champions	Runners-up	Promoted	Relegated

Division shown in bold when it changes due to promotion or relegation. Top scorer shown in bold with † when he set or equalled a club record.

== Footnotes ==
A.: The League Cup was founded in the 1960–61 season.
B.: Figures include goals in the Football and Premier Leagues, FA Cup, League Cup, European competitions, playoffs, Full Members Cup, Football League Trophy, Football League Group Cup and the Football League Third Division North Challenge Cup.
C.: Bradford City were elected to the Second Division for the 1903–04 season.
D.: The Football League Third Division North Cup ran from the 1933–34 season until 1945–46 season.
E.: The 1939–40 season was abandoned in early September and all results annulled, after only three matches had been played.
F.: All FA Cup ties in 1945–46 were played on a two legged basis.
G. ^{a} ^{b} ^{c} : The club successfully applied for re-election to the Football League.
H.: Bradford City were placed in the Third Division on league reorganization.
I.: Accrington Stanley resigned from the league after playing 33 matches. Their results were declared void, omitted from the calculation of the final league table and their league record expunged.
J.: David Layne's 36 goals, 34 in the league and two in the FA Cup, remain a club record.
K.: The 1981–82 season saw the introduction of three points for a win.
L.: The Football League Group Cup was founded in the 1981–82 season and lasted just two seasons.
M.: The Football League Trophy was founded in the 1983–84 season.
N.: Record includes a 0–0 draw against Lincoln City which was abandoned after 40 minutes due to a fire in the main stand. The result at the time was ordered to stand by the Football League.
O.: The Full Members Cup was founded in the 1985–86 season and lasted until the 1991–92 season.
P.: Lost in play-off semi-finals to Middlesbrough.
Q.: The Third Division was renamed the Second Division following the advent of the Premier League.
R.: Promoted via play-offs after defeating Notts County 2–0 in the final.
S.: The Second Division was renamed League One following the advent of the Championship.
T.: Promoted via play-offs after defeating Northampton 3–0 in the final.
U.: Lost to Swansea City in the Final.
V.: Lost in play-off semi-finals to Millwall.
W.: Lost in play-off final to Millwall.
X.: Lost in play-off semi-finals to Carlisle United.

== Sources ==
- Soccerbase
- Football Club History Database
- Football Site
- Frost, Terry (1988). Bradford City A Complete Record 1903–1988. Breedon Books Sport. ISBN 0-907969-38-0.
