= Billy Tunnicliffe =

English footballer

Personal information
- Full name: William Francis Tunnicliffe
- Date of birth: 5 January 1920
- Place of birth: Stoke-on-Trent, England
- Date of death: 1997 (aged 76–77)
- Height: 5 ft 8 1/2 in (1.74 m)
- Position: Outside left

Senior career*
Years	Team	Apps	(Gls)
1937–1938	Port Vale	4	(0)
1938–1947	Bournemouth & Boscombe Athletic	50	(7)
1947–1953	Wrexham	236	(74)
1953–1955	Bradford City	89	(20)
- Stafford Rangers
Total		379	(101)
- * Club domestic league appearances and goals

William Francis Tunnicliffe (5 January 1920 – 1997) was a professional footballer who played outside-left at Port Vale, Bournemouth & Boscombe Athletic, Wrexham, Bradford City, and Stafford Rangers. He made 377 league appearances in the Football League, mostly for Wrexham.

== Career ==
Tunnicliffe joined Port Vale in January 1937, and made his debut at the Old Recreation Ground in a 2–1 victory over Rotherham United on 6 February. He played one further game in the Third Division North in the 1936–37 season, and featured in one league and one FA Cup game in the 1937–38 campaign. He was given a free transfer to Bournemouth & Boscombe Athletic in May 1938. The "Cherries" finished 15th in the Third Division South in 1938–39, before competitive football was put on hold throughout World War II. He returned to Port Vale as a guest in October 1939 and scored ten goals in twenty games of the 1939–40 season before departing again in April 1940. He also guested for Chester and Reading, before returning to Bournemouth. Under the stewardship of Harry Kinghorn, Bournemouth finished seventh in 1946–47. Tunnicliffe scored seven goals in 49 league games at Dean Court before switching to Welsh club Wrexham. The "Dragons" finished third in the Third Division North in 1947–48, though they were ten points behind champions Lincoln City. They dropped down to ninth place in 1948–49 before finishing just two places and one point ahead of the bottom club York City in 1949–50. After manager Les McDowall was replaced by Peter Jackson, Wrexham rose to 14th position in 1950–51, and posted an 18th-place finish in 1951–52. Tunnicliffe scored a hat-trick against Chester City on 26 September 1951. Wrexham made a genuine bid for promotion in the 1952–53 season, but again finished in third place, just three points behind leaders Oldham Athletic. Tunnicliffe made 236 league appearances, scoring 74 goals in his six years at the Racecourse Ground. In 1953, he signed for league rivals Bradford City, where he spent two-and-a-half seasons, scoring 20 goals in 89 league matches. Ivor Powell's "Citizens" finished fifth in 1953–54 before dropping down to 21st position in 1954–55; Tunnicliffe finished as the "Bantams" top-scorer in 1954–55, despite only finding the net seven times during the campaign. He then left both Valley Parade and the Football League to join Cheshire County League side Stafford Rangers.

== Career statistics ==
Appearances and goals by club, season and competition
Club	Season	League			Cup		Total	
Club	Season	Division	Apps	Goals	Apps	Goals	Apps	Goals
Port Vale	1936–37	Third Division North	2	0	1	1	3	1
Port Vale	1937–38	Third Division North	2	0	2	0	4	0
Port Vale	Total		4	0	3	1	7	1
Bournemouth & Boscombe Athletic	1938–39	Third Division South	40	6	4	0	44	6
Bournemouth & Boscombe Athletic	1939–40		0	0	3	1	3	1
Bournemouth & Boscombe Athletic	1946–47	Third Division South	10	1	3	1	13	2
Bournemouth & Boscombe Athletic	Total		50	7	10	2	60	9
Wrexham	1947–48	Third Division North	42	21	2	2	44	23
Wrexham	1948–49	Third Division North	42	11	1	0	43	11
Wrexham	1949–50	Third Division North	40	7	3	3	43	10
Wrexham	1950–51	Third Division North	45	13	2	0	47	13
Wrexham	1951–52	Third Division North	42	13	2	1	44	14
Wrexham	1952–53	Third Division North	25	9	3	0	28	9
Wrexham	Total		236	74	13	6	249	80
Bradford City	1952–53	Third Division North						
Bradford City	1953–54	Third Division North						
Bradford City	1954–55	Third Division North						
Bradford City	Total		89	20	7	2	96	22
Career total			379	101	33	11	412	112
