= Louis Bookman =

Lithuanian footballer and cricketer

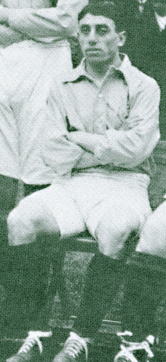

Personal information
- Full name: Louis James Arthur Oscar Buckhalter
- Date of birth: 6 November 1890
- Place of birth: Žagarė, Russian Empire
- Date of death: 10 June 1943 (aged 52)
- Place of death: Dublin, Ireland
- Height: 5 ft 8 in (1.73 m)
- Position: Outside left

Youth career
- Dublin Adelaide
- Frankfurt

Senior career*
Years	Team	Apps	(Gls)
1910–1911	Belfast Celtic		
1911–1914	Bradford City	32	(2)
1914–1915	West Bromwich Albion	16	(1)
1915–1916	Glentoran	23	(1)
1916–1919	Shelbourne	6	(1)
1919–1922	Luton Town	72	(4)
1923–1924	Port Vale	10	(0)
1924–1925	Shelbourne	8	(2)
Total		167	(11)

International career
1911	Ireland amateur	1	(0)
1914–1921	Ireland	4	(0)
- * Club domestic league appearances and goals

Louis "Abraham" Bookman (6 November 1890 – 10 June 1943) was an Irish sportsman of Lithuanian Jewish origin who represented Ireland in both football and cricket. Born the son of a rabbi in Lithuania, he arrived in Ireland in 1895 when his family emigrated to escape antisemitism; his family subsequently adopted the name Bookman.

A speedy outside-left, Bookman represented numerous football clubs, moving from Belfast Celtic to English club Bradford City in 1911, where he became the first Jewish player to play in the English top division. Three years later he switched to West Bromwich Albion, before World War I led him to return to Ireland to play for Glentoran and then Shelbourne. He won the County Antrim Shield with Glentoran and helped Shelbourne to a Leinster Cup and league win in 1918–19. He returned to the Football League of England to sign for Luton Town in 1919 and played over 100 games for the club before joining Port Vale in September 1923. He returned to Shelbourne the following year. He also won four caps for Ireland. He helped the Irish to claim victory in the 1914 edition of the British Home Championship. During his playing career, he experienced antisemitic abuse and occasionally anti-Italian abuse as he was regularly mistaken for someone of Italian origin.

In his cricket career, he represented the Railway Union Cricket Club, the Leinster Cricket Club, Bedfordshire, and Ireland. A left-handed batsman and left-arm spin bowler, he played in nine first-class international matches. After his career in sports was over, he worked on the railways in Ireland and entered the jewellery business.

== Early life ==
Bookman was one of nine children born into an Orthodox Jewish Yiddish-speaking family in Žagarė (Zager) in the Russian Empire (now in Lithuania). When he was young, his parents, Mathias and Jane Buchalter, decided to emigrate to the United States. However, they alighted from the boat carrying them in Cork after mishearing an announcement by the ship's captain. Remaining in Ireland; the family moved to Dublin, where they changed their name to Bookman. They attended the Adelaide Road synagogue, where Bookman began playing football.

== Club career ==
=== Early career ===
Bookman joined the Jewish Athletic Association, and started playing football for the Dublin Jewish team, Adelaide (named after the synagogue). Adelaide, captained by William Woolfson (later founder and long-time CEO of a prominent Irish industrial firm), won the All-Ireland Under-18 Football Cup in 1908. It was from this beginning that Bookman went on to a career in professional football despite the disapproval of his parents of his enthusiasm for sports, especially of him playing football matches on Shabbat.

=== England ===
Bookman began his senior football career in the Irish League with Belfast Celtic, who he joined as an amateur. He joined English side Bradford City in 1911, with City having to pay the transfer fee to Adelaide, who had signed Bookman on as a professional after hearing of interest in him from Bradford. He was nicknamed 'Abraham' or 'Abe' by his teammates, but failed to establish himself as a first-team regular for the "Bantams", making just 32 league appearances in three seasons. Bradford had finished fifth in the First Division and won the FA Cup in 1910–11, but during his time at Valley Parade became a mid-table team. After they finished 11th in 1911–12, Bookman became a scapegoat amongst supporters for the club's decline. They went on finish 13th in 1912–13, and ninth in 1913–14. joined league rivals West Bromwich Albion for the 1914–15 season, but found that his football career was interrupted by the outbreak of the First World War.

=== Return to Ireland ===
During the war he departed The Hawthorns and returned to Ireland to play for Glentoran and Shelbourne. The "Glens" finished second in the Belfast & District League in 1915–16, and were beaten by Linfield in the Irish Cup final; they did though lift the County Antrim Shield after a 1–0 victory over Lisburn Distillery. He then switched The Oval for Shelbourne Park and helped the "Shels" to win both the Leinster Senior Cup and Leinster Senior League in 1918–19.

=== Second spell in England ===
After the war, Bookman was bought by Luton Town for £875, where, despite being over thirty, he enjoyed the most successful spell of his football career. The "Hatters" could only post a 20th-place finish in the Southern League in 1919–20, but were nevertheless elected into the Football League. Luton then finished ninth in the Third Division in 1920–21, before reaching fourth and then fifth in the Third Division South in 1921–22 and 1922–23. He left Kenilworth Road in September 1923, when he was signed by Second Division side Port Vale for a £250 fee. He lost his first-team place in December that year and was released at the end of the 1923–24 season.

=== Second return to Ireland ===
Bookman then returned to Ireland and re-signed for Shelbourne.

== International career ==
In 1911, while playing for Belfast Celtic, Bookman gained an Irish amateur cap. In 1914, together with Val Harris, Patrick O'Connell, Billy Gillespie and Bill Lacey, Bookman was a member of the Ireland team that won the British Home Championship. He won the first of four caps for Ireland in a 2–1 win against Wales on 1 January. He then had to wait a further seven years for more international action, as he won a further three caps in 1921: a 2–0 defeat to Scotland on 26 February, a 2–1 defeat to Wales on 9 April, and a 1–1 draw with England on 22 October.

== Cricket career ==
Louis Bookman
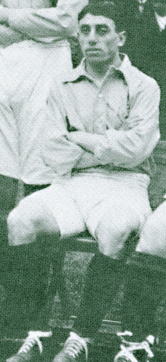

Cricket information
- Batting: Left-handed
- Bowling: Slow left-arm orthodox

International information
- National side: Ireland

Career statistics
Competition	First-class
Matches	9
Runs scored	342
Batting average	20.11
100s/50s	0/1
Top score	53
Balls bowled	348
Wickets	3
Bowling average	63.00
5 wickets in innings	0
10 wickets in match	0
Best bowling	2/32
Catches/stumpings	5/0
- Source: CricketArchive, 16 August 2022

Bookman played cricket for the Railway Union Cricket Club, the Leinster Cricket Club and Bedfordshire. A left-handed batsman and left-arm spin bowler, Bookman made his debut for Ireland in a first-class match against Scotland in July 1920, and went on to play for Ireland on 14 occasions. He played in eight more first-class matches, including one against the West Indies. His last match was against Sir Julien Cahn's XI in July 1930.

== Personal life ==
Bookman married Rebecca Sirota, whose family also originated from Russia; her family disapproved of his sporting career and only allowed him to marry Rebecca after he stopped playing. They had a daughter, Joyce. After finishing his football career, he worked on the railways and as a jeweller. He died in 1943 aged 52.

== Football career statistics ==
=== Club ===
Appearances and goals by club, season and competition
Club	Season	League			FA Cup		Total	
Club	Season	Division	Apps	Goals	Apps	Goals	Apps	Goals
Bradford City	1911–12	First Division	5	0	1	0	6	0
Bradford City	1912–13	First Division	7	0	0	0	7	0
Bradford City	1913–14	First Division	20	2	1	0	21	2
Bradford City	Total		32	2	2	0	34	2
West Bromwich Albion	1914–15	First Division	16	1	0	0	16	1
Glentoran	1915–16	Belfast & District League	23	1				
Luton Town	1920–21	Third Division South	40	4	4	1	44	5
Luton Town	1921–22	Third Division South	32	0	1	0	33	0
Luton Town	Total		72	4	5	1	77	5
Port Vale	1923–24	Second Division	10	0	1	0	11	0
Shelbourne	1924–25	League of Ireland	8	2				

=== International ===
Appearances and goals by national team and year
National team	Year	Apps	Goals
Ireland	1914	1	0
Ireland	1921	3	0
Total		4	0

== Honours ==
Belfast Celtic

- Charity Cup runner-up: 1911

Glentoran

- Irish Cup runner-up: 1916
- County Antrim Shield: 1916

Shelbourne

- Leinster Senior Cup: 1919
- Leinster Senior League: 1918–19

Ireland

- British Home Championship: 1914

== See also ==
- List of select Jewish football (association; soccer) players
