= John Young (footballer, born 1889) =

Scottish footballer

Personal information
- Date of birth: 1889
- Place of birth: Burnbank, Scotland
- Position: Centre-forward

Youth career
- Burnbank Athletic

Senior career*
Years	Team	Apps	(Gls)
1910–1911	Bradford City	10	(8)
1911–1912	Sunderland	13	(2)
1912–1913	Port Vale	18	(11)
1913–1914	Hamilton Academical	4	(1)
Total		45	(22)
- * Club domestic league appearances and goals

John Young (born 1889; date of death unknown) was a Scottish footballer who played as a centre-forward for Bradford City, Sunderland, Port Vale and Hamilton Academical in the 1910s.

== Career ==
Young won junior honours for Scotland whilst leading the forward line at Burnbank Athletic. He was hailed as the next Jimmy Quinn by the Athletic News upon joining Bradford City in April 1910, and scored eight goals in ten First Division appearances for the "Bantams". His performances at Valley Parade attracted interest from Sunderland, and he joined the "Black Cats" in November 1911. He scored on his debut for the "Wearsiders" against West Bromwich Albion at Roker Park on 9 December. Still, he left the club at the end of the 1911–12 season after scoring only one further goal in his next 14 appearances.

He joined Port Vale in the summer of 1912. His debut came in a 5–0 defeat at Stalybridge Celtic in a Central League match on 3 September 1912; the awful result was compounded by the twisted knee he gained during the match which caused him to be stretchered off and sidelined him for much of the autumn. After being declared fit again in November 1913 he scored eleven goals in his next 19 games, but was released at the end of the season. He returned to Scotland and scored one goal in four Division One games for Hamilton Academical in the 1913–14 season.

== Career statistics ==
Appearances and goals by club, season and competition
Club	Season	League			FA Cup		Total	
Club	Season	Division	Apps	Goals	Apps	Goals	Apps	Goals
Bradford City	1910–11	First Division	9	8	0	0	9	8
Bradford City	1911–12	First Division	1	0	0	0	1	0
Bradford City	Total		10	8	0	0	10	8
Sunderland	1911–12	First Division	13	2	2	0	15	2
Port Vale	1912–13	Central League	18	11	0	0	18	11
Hamilton Academical	1913–14	Division One	4	1	—		4	1
Career total			45	22	2	0	47	22
