= Bernie the Bolt =

Bernie the Bolt may refer to:

- A catchphrase and crossbow operator on The Golden Shot
- Bernie Wright (born 1952), an English footballer
