= Billy Webster =

English footballer (1909–?)

Personal information
- Date of birth: 1909
- Place of birth: Sunderland, Tyne and Wear, England
- Position: Winger

Senior career*
Years	Team	Apps	(Gls)
1929–1930	Usworth Colliery		
1930–1932	Stockport County	73	(17)
1932–1933	Bradford City	16	(4)
1933–1934	Port Vale	0	(0)
1934–1935	Accrington Stanley	0	(0)
1935–1936	Gateshead	24	(4)
1936–1937	Stalybridge Celtic		
1937–193?	Horden Colliery Welfare		
Total		113+	(25+)
- * Club domestic league appearances and goals

William T. Webster (1909–?) was an English professional footballer who played as a winger.

== Career statistics ==
Appearances and goals by club, season and competition
Club	Season	League			FA Cup		Total	
Club	Season	Division	Apps	Goals	Apps	Goals	Apps	Goals
Stockport County	1930–31	Third Division North	38	11	2	1	40	12
Stockport County	1931–32	Third Division North	35	6	1	0	36	6
Stockport County	Total		73	17	3	1	76	18
Bradford City	1932–33	Second Division	16	4	0	0	16	4
Port Vale	1933–34	Second Division	0	0	0	0	0	0
Accrington Stanley	1934–35	Third Division North	0	0	0	0	0	0
Gateshead	1935–36	Third Division North	24	4	0	0	24	4
Career total			113	25	3	1	116	26
