= Bernie Wright =

British footballer

Personal information
- Full name: Bernard Peter Wright
- Date of birth: 17 September 1952 (age 74)
- Place of birth: Birmingham, England
- Height: 5 ft 11 in (1.80 m)
- Position: Centre-forward

Youth career
- 1970–1971: Birmingham City

Senior career*
Years	Team	Apps	(Gls)
1971	Paget Rangers		
1971–1972	Walsall	15	(2)
1972–1973	Everton	11	(2)
1973–1976	Walsall	152	(38)
1976–1978	Bradford City	66	(13)
1978–1980	Port Vale	76	(23)
- Kidderminster Harriers
- Trowbridge Town
- Cheltenham Town
- Worcester City
- Gloucester City
- Burton Albion
Total		320+	(78+)
- * Club domestic league appearances and goals

Bernard Peter Wright (born 17 September 1952), nicknamed Bernie the Bolt, is an English former footballer. A tough centre-forward, he scored 78 goals in 320 league games in a nine-year career in the Football League.

A youth team player at Birmingham City, he joined Paget Rangers of the Midland Combination before having a successful trial at Walsall in 1971. He moved on to Everton in 1972. After one season with the "Toffees", he returned to Walsall. In 1976, he transferred to Bradford City, winning promotion out of the Fourth Division in 1976–77, before signing for Port Vale two years later for a £9,000 fee. In 1980, he went into non-League football with Kidderminster Harriers, later playing for Trowbridge Town, Cheltenham Town, Worcester City, Gloucester City and Burton Albion.

== Career ==
Born in Birmingham, Wright was a youth team player at Birmingham City before he played for Paget Rangers of the Midland Combination after being released from St Andrew's in 1971. He returned to the professional game at Third Division Walsall under Bill Moore. He scored on his debut in the English Football League in a 2–0 win over Port Vale on 2 October 1971. He was signed by Harry Catterick's Everton after impressing in an FA Cup clash between Everton and Walsall at Goodison Park on 5 February 1972. However, he only played eleven First Division games for the club, scoring two goals, before having his contract terminated for 'serious misconduct' after a training ground incident. He had punched coach Stewart Imlach after he had overlooked Wright for a first-team spot. Though he only enjoyed an eleven-month stay with the club, he created an impression on the Everton fans, who remember him for using his head to accidentally break the toe of Sheffield United centre-back Eddie Colquhoun during an attempted diving header.

Wright returned to Walsall in 1973 for a fee of £10,000, and scored 38 goals in 152 league games during his four years at Fellows Park. After struggling in the lower half of the table in 1972–73 and 1973–74 under John Smith and then Ronnie Allen, the "Saddlers" came close to promotion in 1974–75 and 1975–76 under Doug Fraser's stewardship. He joined Bobby Kennedy's Bradford City in 1976, where he scored 13 goals in 66 league games. Bradford won promotion out of the Fourth Division in 1976–77, but suffered relegation in 1977–78 under John Napier. Wright and Don Hutchins were joint-top scorers in 1977–78 with ten goals. Wright left the club and returned to the Midlands as his wife failed to settle in the area.

In June 1978, Dennis Butler's Port Vale paid the "Bantams" £9,000 to secure Wright's services; Vale had been relegated along with Bradford the previous season. Wright scored on his debut, a 1–1 draw at Chester in a League Cup game on 16 August. Nine days later, the tough striker endeared himself to "Valiants" fans when he scored a hat-trick past local rivals Crewe Alexandra at Gresty Road. He finished as top scorer in the 1978–79 season with 15 strikes in 48 games and was voted Player of the Year for this achievement. He was popular with the fans, who would chant "Bernie's evil" in matches. Wright stated that he was always seen as a provider of goals at his previous clubs, whereas Butler saw him as a goalscorer. However, he lost his place under caretaker manager Alan Bloor, though regained it with a brace against Northampton Town. He recorded nine goals in 33 games in 1979–80. Still, he fell out with new manager John McGrath after refusing to move closer to Burslem from his home in Birmingham. He dropped out of the Football League at the end of the season, joining Kidderminster Harriers of the Southern Football League on a free transfer. He later played for Trowbridge Town, Cheltenham Town, Worcester City, Gloucester City and Burton Albion.

== Style of play ==
Wright was a strong and tough centre-forward whose long hair and beard combination helped to intimidate opposition defenders. He had a reputation as a 'hard man'.

== Post-retirement ==
Wright later became a forklift truck supervisor and part-time referee in the Central Warwickshire Sunday Leagues.

== Career statistics ==
Appearances and goals by club, season and competition
Club	Season	League			FA Cup		League Cup		Total	
Club	Season	Division	Apps	Goals	Apps	Goals	Apps	Goals	Apps	Goals
Walsall	1971–72	Third Division	15	2	5	3	0	0	20	5
Everton	1971–72	First Division	8	1	0	0	0	0	8	1
Everton	1972–73	First Division	3	1	0	0	0	0	3	1
Everton	Total		11	2	0	0	0	0	11	2
Walsall	1972–73	Third Division	16	6	0	0	0	0	16	6
Walsall	1973–74	Third Division	28	7	2	0	4	0	34	7
Walsall	1974–75	Third Division	41	8	6	2	1	0	48	10
Walsall	1975–76	Third Division	44	12	1	0	2	0	47	12
Walsall	1976–77	Third Division	23	5	5	2	3	1	31	8
Walsall	Total		152	38	14	4	10	1	176	43
Bradford City	1976–77	Fourth Division	20	3	0	0	0	0	20	3
Bradford City	1977–78	Third Division	46	10	1	0	2	0	49	10
Bradford City	Total		66	13	1	0	2	0	69	13
Port Vale	1978–79	Fourth Division	46	14	1	0	1	1	48	15
Port Vale	1979–80	Fourth Division	30	9	1	0	2	0	33	9
Port Vale	Total		76	23	2	0	3	1	81	24
Career total			320	78	22	7	15	2	357	87

== Honours ==
Bradford City

- Football League Fourth Division fourth-place promotion: 1976–77
