= John Deakin (disambiguation) =

John Deakin (1912–1972) was an English photographer.

John or Jack Deakin may also refer to:

- John Deakin (footballer) (born 1966), English footballer
- John Deakin (rowing) (born 1965), British coxswain
- Jack Deakin (footballer, born 1912) (1912–2001), English footballer
- Jack Deakin (footballer, born 1873) (1873–after 1899), English footballer
- Johnny Deakin, Scottish footballer
