= Stan Scrimshaw =

English footballer (1915–1988)

Personal information
- Date of birth: 7 August 1915
- Place of birth: West Hartlepool
- Date of death: March 1988 (Aged 72)
- Place of death: Halifax, West Yorkshire
- Height: 5 ft 10 in (1.78 m)
- Positions: Inside forward; centre-back (Note: Scrimshaw played a centre-back later in his career.)

Youth career
- St Aidan's

Senior career*
Years	Team	Apps	(Gls)
1935	Hetton United		
1935	Easington C.W.		
1935–1937	Hartlepools United	18	(1)
1937–1947	Bradford City	20	(0)
1947	Frickley Colliery		
1947–1949	Halifax Town	52	(0)
1949–50	Shrewsbury Town		
- * Club domestic league appearances and goals

Stanley Scrimshaw (7 August 1915 – March 1988) was an English professional footballer. Between 1935 and 1949 in a career which was interrupted for seven years by World War II he made 90 appearances, scoring one goal, in the Football League Third Division North for Hartlepools United, Bradford City and Halifax Town.

He was born in West Hartlepool and whilst attached to the West Hartlepool Junior League club St Aidan's was selected to the West Hartlepools school boys team. He continued with and in 1934 captained St Aidan's in the Hartlepools Church League – at this stage of his career he played as an inside-forward. In the summer of 1935, having the previous season been with Hetton United, he signed on with fellow Wearside League club Easington Colliery Works.

His stay at Easington was brief as in October 1935, aged 20, he joined Hartlepools United as an amateur and initially played in their reserve team in the North Eastern League (he had previously played with the Hartlepools reserves in April 1935). He made his debut for the first team in the Football League Third Division North during December 1935 against Halifax Town playing as a wing-half and in January 1936 he signed as a professional player with the club. Over the season he made a total of nine first team league appearances (the majority as an inside-forward). He played in a further nine league matches in the following 1936–1937 season and scored his only Football league career goal in October 1936, an equaliser in a 1–1 away draw against Rochdale. At the season's end he was on club's retained list but in June 1937 was transferred, as a forward, to Bradford City.

He didn't make his Bradford City league debut until January 1938 but played in sixteen matches in the second half of the 1937–1938 season: although initially playing as an inside forward, in the majority of these matches he played as a wing-half. During this period he scored a goal for the first team in a Third Division North League Cup match at Gateshead and played in the team that were beaten in the final by Southport. He played only twice in the first team the next season; shortly after the commencement of the ensuing 1939–1940 season traditional league football was suspended owing to World War II. During the war years, in addition to playing as a wartime guest player with other clubs, between 1942 and 1946 he played 29 Wartime League and cup matches for Bradford City. In one of these in September 1945 he broke his ankle, but recovered and played again during April 1946. On resumption of peacetime football, now aged 31, he signed-on again with Bradford City for the 1946–1947 season and played in their first league match of the campaign. He played only once more during the remainder of the season and at its conclusion he was placed on the club's free transfer list.

Subsequently, at the start of the 1946–1947 season he signed for Midland League club Frickley Colliery before in October 1946 returning to the Football League Third Division North with Halifax Town. Playing now chiefly as a centre-half he was team captain in the 1948–1949 season. During his time at Halifax, as at his other clubs, he played in the club's reserve side and in April 1948 he was captain of the Halifax Town Reserves team that were beaten by South Kirby Colliery in the final of the Yorkshire League Cup. He remained at Halifax until November 1949 when he transferred to Midland League Shrewsbury Town where he played for the remainder of the 1949–1950 season.

== Football League Career statistics ==
Appearances and goals by club, season and competition
Club	Season	League			FA Cup		Other		Total	
Club	Season	Division	Apps	Goals	Apps	Goals	Apps	Goals	Apps	Goals
Hartlepools; United	1935–36	Football League; Third Division North	9	0	0	0	0	0	9	0
Hartlepools; United	1936–37	Football League; Third Division North	9	1	0	0	2	0	11	1
Hartlepools; United	Total		18	1	0	0	2	0	20	1
Bradford City	1937–38	Football League; Third Division North	16	0	2	0	4	1	22	1
Bradford City	1938–39	Football League; Third Division North	2	0	0	0	1	0	3	0
Bradford City	1946–47	Football League; Third Division North	2	0	0	0	0	0	2	0
Bradford City	Total		20	0	2	0	5	1	27	1
Halifax Town	1947–48	Football League; Third Division North	17	0	0	0	0	0	17	0
Halifax Town	1948–49	Football League; Third Division North	33	0	1	0	0	0	34	0
Halifax Town	1949–50	Football League; Third Division North	2	0	0	0	0	0	2	0
Halifax Town	Total		52	0	1	0	0	0	53	0
Career total			90	1	3	0	7	1	100	2
Other = Football League Division Three North League Cup
