= 1962–63 Carlisle United F.C. season =

Carlisle United F.C.
1962–63 season
- Manager: Ivor Powell
- Stadium: Brunton Park
- Third Division: 23rd
- FA Cup: Third Round
- League Cup: Third Round

For the 1962–63 season, Carlisle United F.C. competed in Football League Division Three.

== Results & fixtures ==
=== Football League Third Division ===
==== League table ====
Pos	Team	Pld	W	D	L	GF	GA	GAv	Pts	Promotion or relegation
20	Reading	46	16	8	22	74	78	0.949	40	
21	Bradford Park Avenue	46	14	12	20	79	97	0.814	40	Relegated
22	Brighton & Hove Albion	46	12	12	22	58	84	0.690	36	Relegated
23	Carlisle United	46	13	9	24	61	89	0.685	35	Relegated
24	Halifax Town	46	9	12	25	64	106	0.604	30	Relegated

==== Matches ====
Match Day	Date	Opponent	H/A	Score	Carlisle United Scorer(s)	Attendance
1	21 August	Peterborough United	H	1–4		
2	24 August	Queen's Park Rangers	H	2–5		
3	27 August	Peterborough United	A	2–2		
4	31 August	Hull City	A	1–3		
5	8 September	Crystal Palace	H	2–2		
6	12 September	Bradford Park Avenue	A	1–3		
7	15 September	Wrexham	A	1–2		
8	18 September	Swindon Town	H	0–0		
9	22 September	Halifax Town	H	1–0		
10	29 September	Bristol Rovers	A	1–1		
11	2 October	Brighton & Hove Albion	H	1–0		
12	5 October	Bristol City	H	2–5		
13	9 October	Brighton & Hove Albion	A	0–1		
14	12 October	Reading	A	0–2		
15	20 October	Port Vale	H	1–1		
16	27 October	Shrewsbury Town	A	1–1		
17	10 November	Southend United	A	0–2		
18	17 November	Colchester United	H	3–1		
19	30 November	Bournemouth & Boscombe Athletic	H	0–3		
20	8 December	Coventry City	A	2–3		
21	15 December	Northampton Town	H	1–2		
22	22 December	Queen's Park Rangers	A	2–2		
23	26 December	Watford	H	2–1		
24	29 December	Watford	A	1–5		
25	23 February	Bristol City	A	2–2		
26	9 March	Port Vale	A	0–2		
27	12 March	Notts County	H	4–2		
28	16 March	Shrewsbury Town	H	2–1		
29	21 March	Notts County	A	0–1		
30	23 March	Millwall	A	0–2		
31	26 March	Halifax Town	A	4–2		
32	30 March	Southend United	H	1–2		
33	2 April	Bristol Rovers	H	4–0		
34	6 April	Colchester United	A	1–2		
35	12 April	Barnsley	H	2–1		
36	16 April	Barnsley	A	0–2		
37	20 April	Bournemouth & Boscombe Athletic	A	1–5		
38	23 April	Bradford Park Avenue	H	3–0		
39	27 April	Coventry City	H	0–1		
40	30 April	Swindon Town	A	0–2		
41	6 May	Reading	H	1–1		
42	9 May	Northampton Town	A	0–2		
43	11 May	Hull City	H	2–1		
44	14 May	Millwall	H	4–3		
45	18 May	Crystal Palace	A	0–3		
46	23 May	Wrexham	H	2–1		

=== Football League Cup ===
Round	Date	Opponent	H/A	Score	Carlisle United Scorer(s)	Attendance
R1	3 September	Tranmere Rovers	A	3–2		
R2	26 September	Torquay United	A	2–1		
R3	16 October	Norwich City	H	1–1		
R3 R	26 September	Norwich City	A	0–5		

=== FA Cup ===
Round	Date	Opponent	H/A	Score	Carlisle United Scorer(s)	Attendance
R1	3 November	Hartlepools United	H	2–1		
R2	24 November	Blyth Spartans	A	2–0		
R3	29 January	Gravesend & Northfleet	H	0–1		
