= 1983–84 Bradford City A.F.C. season =

Bradford City A.F.C.
1983-84 season
- Division Three: 7th Place
- FA Cup: 1st Round
- Milk Cup: 1st Round

The 1983–84 Bradford City A.F.C. season was the 71st in the club's history.

The club finished 7th in Division Three, reached the 1st round of the FA Cup, and the 1st round of the Milk Cup.

After suffering from financial difficulties throughout the 1982–83 season, the club was bought by former directors Stafford Heginbotham and Jack Tordoff in August 1983.

Beginning on 26 November 1983, the club won a club-record 10 matches in a row. The club scored 18 goals in December 1983, winning an award.

== Sources ==
- Frost, Terry (1988). Bradford City A Complete Record 1903-1988. Breedon Books Sport. ISBN 0-907969-38-0.
