= 1984–85 Bradford City A.F.C. season =

English football club season

Bradford City A.F.C.
1984-85 season
- Chairman: Stafford Heginbotham
- Manager: Trevor Cherry
- Stadium: Valley Parade
- Division Three: Champion (promoted)
- FA Cup: 3rd Round
- Milk Cup: 2nd Round

The 1984–85 Bradford City A.F.C. season was the 72nd in the club's history.

The club finished 1st in Division Three, being promoted as Champions to Division Two, reached the 3rd round of the FA Cup, and the 2nd round of the Milk Cup.

The club finished the season as Champions of Division Three, but their final home game on 11 May 1985 was overshadowed by the Bradford City fire which saw 56 people die and their home stadium Valley Parade badly damaged.

== Sources ==
- Frost, Terry (1988). Bradford City A Complete Record 1903-1988. Breedon Books Sport. ISBN 0-907969-38-0.
