= 1956–57 Bradford City A.F.C. season =

Bradford City A.F.C.
1956–57 season
- Manager: Peter Jackson
- Ground: Valley Parade
- Third Division North: 9th
- FA Cup: First round

The 1956–57 Bradford City A.F.C. season was the 44th in the club's history.

The club finished 9th in Division Three North, and reached the 1st round of the FA Cup.

== Sources ==
- Frost, Terry (1988). Bradford City A Complete Record 1903-1988. Breedon Books Sport. ISBN 0-907969-38-0.
