= Peter Jackson (footballer, born 1937) =

English footballer (1937-1991)

Personal information
- Date of birth: 23 January 1937
- Place of birth: Stoke-on-Trent, England
- Date of death: September 1991 (aged 54)
- Position: Half back

Senior career*
Years	Team	Apps	(Gls)
1954	Wrexham	7	(1)
1954–1955	Marine		
1955–1961	Bradford City	199	(15)
1961–1965	Tranmere Rovers	81	(3)
- Frickley Colliery
- Altrincham
1968	Hyde United	14	(0)
- Macclesfield Town
- Guiseley
- * Club domestic league appearances and goals

Peter Jackson (23 January 1937 – September 1991) was an English footballer whose career mirrored that of his twin brother David. Peter Jackson was a half back who started his career with his brother at Wrexham, where their father Peter senior was manager. The trio later teamed up at Bradford City, where the two brothers played a combined 449 league games. They also played together at Marine, Tranmere Rovers, Frickley Colliery, Altrincham and Hyde United. Peter died in September 1991, aged 54.

== Career ==
Twin brothers Peter and David Jackson were born on 23 January 1937 in Stoke-on-Trent, England. Their father was also Peter, a footballer and football manager. The brothers started their own football career, at Wrexham in 1954, where their father was manager. They made their debut together against Carlisle United at the Racecourse Ground in October 1954, but soon afterwards their father left for Bradford City. The pair soon also left Wrexham, having played seven games each, to join non-league Marine. They also played together for the Liverpool FA against a Football Association of Ireland side in 1955, before they teamed up with their father again at Division Three (North) side Bradford City.

Peter junior made his debut against Grimsby Town on 30 April 1955, ten days after his brother had made his City debut against the same side. Peter played two games during his first season at Valley Parade but they both spent six seasons at City, all in Division Three (North), or the newly formed Division Three level. Peter played 199 league games, scoring 15 goals, while his brother played 250 league games. In total they played 492 league and cup games for City, scoring 83 goals between them. Peter was also awarded a benefit game in 1960, five months after he broke his leg in a home game against Southampton. In November 1960, they were part of the team that defeated Manchester United 2–1 at Valley Parade in the first season of the League Cup. But just five months later, they left City, when their father was sacked in March 1961.

Instead, the pair signed together for Tranmere Rovers for a combined fee of £3,000. Peter played 81 league games with Tranmere during a little more than three seasons, where he was also captain, and left to team up with his brother again at Frickley Colliery in 1965. They also played together at Altrincham and Hyde United, with Peter also playing in non-league for Macclesfield Town and Guiseley.

The pair also played cricket and golf. Like his brother, Peter was only ever a part-time professional, and after retiring, he became a partner in a firm of chartered accountants and was treasurer of the ex-players' association of Bradford City and Bradford Park Avenue.
