= 1957–58 Bradford City A.F.C. season =

Bradford City A.F.C.
1957–58 season
- Manager: Peter Jackson
- Ground: Valley Parade
- Third Division North: 3rd
- FA Cup: Third round

The 1957–58 Bradford City A.F.C. season was the 45th in the club's history.

The club finished 3rd in Division Three North, and reached the 3rd round of the FA Cup.

== Sources ==
- Frost, Terry (1988). Bradford City A Complete Record 1903-1988. Breedon Books Sport. ISBN 0-907969-38-0.
