= 1958–59 Bradford City A.F.C. season =

Bradford City A.F.C.
1958–59 season
- Manager: Peter Jackson
- Ground: Valley Parade
- Third Division: 11th
- FA Cup: Fourth round

The 1958–59 Bradford City A.F.C. season was the 46th in the club's history.

The club finished 11th in Division Three, and reached the 4th round of the FA Cup.

== Sources ==
- Frost, Terry (1988). Bradford City A Complete Record 1903-1988. Breedon Books Sport. ISBN 0-907969-38-0.
