= 1985–86 Bradford City A.F.C. season =

Bradford City A.F.C.
1985-86 season
- Chairman: Stafford Heginbotham
- Manager: Trevor Cherry
- Division Two: 13th Place
- FA Cup: 3rd Round
- Milk Cup: 2nd Round

The 1985–86 Bradford City A.F.C. season was the 73rd in the club's history.

The club finished 13th in Division Two, reached the 3rd round of the FA Cup, and the 2nd round of the Milk Cup.

Following damage to home stadium Valley Parade at the end of the 1984–85 season during the Bradford City fire, the club played all 'home' matches during the 1985–86 season at neutral grounds, with two groundshares namely Elland Road in Leeds (shared with local rivals Leeds United), Leeds Road in Huddersfield (shared with Huddersfield Town) and Temporary ground Odsal in Bradford. It cost £2.6million to redevelop Valley Parade.

== Sources ==
- Frost, Terry (1988). Bradford City A Complete Record 1903-1988. Breedon Books Sport. ISBN 0-907969-38-0.
