= 1959–60 Bradford City A.F.C. season =

Bradford City A.F.C.
1959–60 season
- Manager: Peter Jackson
- Ground: Valley Parade
- Third Division: 19th
- FA Cup: Fifth round

The 1959–60 Bradford City A.F.C. season was the 47th in the club's history.

The club finished 19th in Division Three, and reached the 5th round of the FA Cup.

== Sources ==
- Frost, Terry (1988). Bradford City A Complete Record 1903-1988. Breedon Books Sport. ISBN 0-907969-38-0.
