= 1963–64 Bradford City A.F.C. season =

Bradford City A.F.C.
1963–64 season
- Manager: Bob Brocklebank
- Ground: Valley Parade
- Fourth Division: 5th
- FA Cup: First round
- League Cup: First round

The 1963–64 Bradford City A.F.C. season was the 51st in the club's history.

The club finished 5th in Division Four, reached the 1st round of the FA Cup, and the 1st round of the League Cup.

== Sources ==
- Frost, Terry (1988). Bradford City A Complete Record 1903-1988. Breedon Books Sport. ISBN 0-907969-38-0.
