= 1975–76 Bradford City A.F.C. season =

Bradford City A.F.C.
1975-76 season
- The Football League: 17th Place
- FA Cup: 6th Round
- League Cup: 1st Round

The 1975–76 Bradford City A.F.C. season was the 63rd in the club's history.

The club finished 17th in Division Four, reached the 6th round of the FA Cup, and the 1st round of the League Cup.

== Sources ==
- Frost, Terry (1988). Bradford City A Complete Record 1903-1988. Breedon Books Sport. ISBN 0-907969-38-0.
