= 1947–48 Bradford City A.F.C. season =

Bradford City A.F.C.
1947–48 season
- Manager: Jack Milburn
- Ground: Valley Parade
- Third Division North: 14th
- FA Cup: Second round
colours

The 1947–48 Bradford City A.F.C. season was the 35th in the club's history.

The club finished 14th in Division Three North, and reached the 2nd round of the FA Cup.

== Sources ==
- Frost, Terry (1988). Bradford City A Complete Record 1903-1988. Breedon Books Sport. ISBN 0-907969-38-0.
