= 1967–68 Bradford City A.F.C. season =

Bradford City A.F.C.
1967–68 season
- Ground: Valley Parade
- Fourth Division: 5th
- FA Cup: Second round
- League Cup: First round

The 1967–68 Bradford City A.F.C. season was the 55th in the club's history.

The club finished 5th in Division Four, reached the 2nd round of the FA Cup, and the 1st round of the League Cup.

== Sources ==
- Frost, Terry (1988). Bradford City A Complete Record 1903-1988. Breedon Books Sport. ISBN 0-907969-38-0.
