= Charlie Moore (footballer, born 1905) =

English footballer

Personal information
- Date of birth: 23 September 1905
- Place of birth: Worksop, England
- Date of death: December 1972 (aged 67)
- Place of death: Shipley, Bradford, England
- Height: 5 ft 9 in (1.75 m)
- Positions: Striker; inside forward; half back

Senior career*
Years	Team	Apps	(Gls)
- Manton Colliery
1926–1939	Bradford City	339	(53)
- * Club domestic league appearances and goals

Charles Moore (23 September 1905 – December 1972) was an English footballer who spent his entire professional career with Bradford City playing 339 league games.

== Career ==
Born in Worksop on 23 September 1905, Charlie Moore started his football career with nearby Manton Colliery before signing with Bradford City in October 1926 as an inside forward. He scored on his debut in a 4–3 win over Manchester City on 18 December 1926 and, later the same season, played five games alongside his brother Fred. He concluded the season with eight goals, finishing as joint top goal-scorer. He moved to centre forward the following season, during which he scored 16 league goals to again be top goal-scorer, including five against Nelson. He was limited to just 14 games in 1928–29 but scored seven goals as City won Division Three (North). He dropped into the half back line after the club signed new forwards.

Moore was a one-club man with City, as they remained in Division Two until relegation in 1936–37, during which time Moore was sent off twice and received a benefit match against Notts County. He retired in 1940 following the outbreak of the Second World War, by which time he had amassed 339 league appearances and 53 goals as well as another 29 FA Cup games and seven cup goals. His total was second only in the club's history to George Robinson at the time he retired.

== Death ==
He died in Shipley, Yorkshire in December 1972 at the age of 67.

== Honours ==
Bradford City

- Football League Third Division North: 1928–29

== See also ==
- List of one-club men
