= 1938–39 Bradford City A.F.C. season =

Bradford City A.F.C.
1938–39 season
- Manager: Fred Westgarth
- Ground: Valley Parade
- Third Division North: 3rd
- FA Cup: First round

The 1938–39 Bradford City A.F.C. season was the 32nd in the club's history.

The club finished 3rd in Division Three North, and reached the 1st round of the FA Cup.

== Sources ==
- Frost, Terry (1988). Bradford City A Complete Record 1903-1988. Breedon Books Sport. ISBN 0-907969-38-0.
