= 1949–50 Bradford City A.F.C. season =

Bradford City A.F.C.
1949–50 season
- Manager: David Steele
- Ground: Valley Parade
- Third Division North: 19th
- FA Cup: Second round

The 1949–50 Bradford City A.F.C. season was the 37th in the club's history.

The club finished 19th in Division Three North, and reached the 2nd round of the FA Cup.

== Sources ==
- Frost, Terry (1988). Bradford City A Complete Record 1903-1988. Breedon Books Sport. ISBN 0-907969-38-0.
