= 1925–26 Bradford City A.F.C. season =

English football club season

The 1925–26 Bradford City A.F.C. season was the 19th in the club's history.

The club finished 16th in Division Two, and reached the 3rd round of the FA Cup.
