= 1950–51 Bradford City A.F.C. season =

Bradford City A.F.C.
1950–51 season
- Manager: David Steele
- Ground: Valley Parade
- Third Division North: 7th
- FA Cup: First round

The 1950–51 Bradford City A.F.C. season was the 38th in the club's history.

The club finished 7th in Division Three North, and reached the 1st round of the FA Cup.

== Sources ==
- Frost, Terry (1988). Bradford City A Complete Record 1903-1988. Breedon Books Sport. ISBN 0-907969-38-0.
