= 1966–67 Bradford City A.F.C. season =

Bradford City A.F.C.
1966–67 season
- Ground: Valley Parade
- Fourth Division: 11th
- FA Cup: First round
- League Cup: First round

The 1966–67 Bradford City A.F.C. season was the 54th in the club's history.

The club finished 11th in Division Four, reached the 1st round of the FA Cup, and the 1st round of the League Cup.

The club suffered financial difficulties, and held a public meeting at St George's Hall in January 1967 to save the club from folding.

== Sources ==
- Frost, Terry (1988). Bradford City A Complete Record 1903-1988. Breedon Books Sport. ISBN 0-907969-38-0.
