= 1915–16 Belfast & District League =

Belfast & District League
- Season: 1915–16
- Dates: 18 September 1915 – 27 November 1915
- Champions: Linfield
- Matches played: 30
- Goals scored: 83 (2.77 per match)
- Biggest home win: Distillery 7–0 Glenavon
- Biggest away win: Glenavon 0–6 Linfield
- Highest scoring: Distillery 7–0 Glenavon; Glentoran 5–2 Glenavon

The Irish League in season 1915–16 was suspended due to the First World War. A Belfast & District League was played instead by 6 teams, and Linfield won the championship.

== Season summary ==
Due to the outbreak of World War I, the Irish League was officially suspended. The Belfast & District League took its place with all matches played in Belfast. The Dublin sides Bohemians and Shelbourne did not compete, while Belfast Celtic refused to join on the basis that the competition was to be on a professional rather than an amateur basis. Their place was therefore taken by a new team, Belfast United who played all their matches away from home. Glenavon also participated in the league; given their home ground Mourneview Park is based in Lurgan, they were unable to use it as a home ground and therefore they also played all their matches away from home. Belfast United's home match with Glenavon was played at The Oval while Glenavon's home match with United was played at Grosvenor Park.

== Teams and locations ==
Location of Belfast teams in the 1915–16 Belfast & District League season; all matches were played in Belfast

Team	Town	Home Ground
Belfast United	No home ground	
Cliftonville	Belfast	Solitude
Distillery	Belfast	Grosvenor Park
Glenavon	No home ground	
Glentoran	Belfast	The Oval
Linfield	Belfast	Windsor Park

== League standings ==
Pos	Team	Pld	W	D	L	GF	GA	GR	Pts	Result
1	Linfield (C)	10	7	2	1	17	4	4.250	16	Champions
2	Glentoran	10	5	4	1	20	10	2.000	14	
3	Distillery	10	5	2	3	18	9	2.000	12	
4	Belfast United	10	3	3	4	14	13	1.077	9	
5	Cliftonville	10	2	4	4	7	14	0.500	8	
6	Glenavon	10	0	1	9	7	33	0.212	1	

Source: rsssf.com
(C) Champions

== Results ==
Home \ Away	BEL	CLI	DIS	GLV	GLT	LIN
Belfast United		0–0	0–2	3–1	2–2	1–0
Cliftonville	2–1		0–2	0–0	1–0	0–2
Distillery	1–1	1–1		7–0	1–0	0–1
Glenavon	0–4	2–3	0–1		1–2	0–6
Glentoran	2–1	4–0	4–2	5–2		0–0
Linfield	3–1	1–0	2–1	2–1	0–0	

Source: Irish League Archive
Legend: Blue = home team win; Yellow = draw; Red = away team win.
