= 1946–47 Bradford City A.F.C. season =

Bradford City A.F.C.
1946–47 season
- Manager: Jack Barker (until 1 January); Jack Milburn (from 1 January)
- Ground: Valley Parade
- Third Division North: 5th
- FA Cup: First round
colours

The 1946–47 Bradford City A.F.C. season was the 34th in the club's history.

The club finished 5th in Division Three North, and reached the 1st round of the FA Cup.

It was the club's first season following the resumption of league football following World War Two.

== Sources ==
- Frost, Terry (1988). Bradford City A Complete Record 1903-1988. Breedon Books Sport. ISBN 0-907969-38-0.
