= 1960–61 Bradford City A.F.C. season =

Bradford City A.F.C.
1960–61 season
- Ground: Valley Parade
- Third Division: 22nd (relegated)
- FA Cup: Second round
- League Cup: Third round

The 1960–61 Bradford City A.F.C. season was the 48th in the club's history.

The club finished 22nd in Division Three (being relegated to Division Four), reached the 2nd round of the FA Cup and the 3rd round of the League Cup.

== Sources ==
- Frost, Terry (1988). Bradford City A Complete Record 1903-1988. Breedon Books Sport. ISBN 0-907969-38-0.
