= 1928–29 Bradford City A.F.C. season =

English football club season

The 1928–29 Bradford City A.F.C. season was the 22nd in the club's history.

The club finished 1st in Division Three North, and reached the 4th round of the FA Cup. The club won promotion back to Division Two.

== Sources ==
- Frost, Terry (1988). Bradford City A Complete Record 1903-1988. Breedon Books Sport. ISBN 0-907969-38-0.
