= 1962–63 Bradford City A.F.C. season =

Bradford City A.F.C.
1962–63 season
- Manager: Bob Brocklebank
- Ground: Valley Parade
- Fourth Division: 23rd
- FA Cup: Third round
- League Cup: First round

The 1962–63 Bradford City A.F.C. season was the 50th in the club's history.

The club finished 23rd in Division Four (being re-elected to maintain their Football League status), reached the 3rd round of the FA Cup, and the 1st round of the League Cup.

The club had to be re-elected to maintain their Football League status for the second time in their history, the first being in 1948–49.

== Sources ==
- Frost, Terry (1988). Bradford City A Complete Record 1903-1988. Breedon Books Sport. ISBN 0-907969-38-0.
