= 1982–83 Bradford City A.F.C. season =

Bradford City A.F.C.
1982-83 season
- Division Three: 12th place
- FA Cup: 3rd round
- League Cup: 3rd round

The 1982–83 Bradford City A.F.C. season was the 70th in the club's history.

The club finished 12th in Division Three, reached the 3rd round of the FA Cup, and the 3rd round of the League Cup.

The club suffered financial difficulties during this season; an Official Receiver was appointed, the club was put up for sale, and a 'Save Bradford City' fund was launched in July 1983.

== Sources ==
- Frost, Terry (1988). Bradford City A Complete Record 1903-1988. Breedon Books Sport. ISBN 0-907969-38-0.
