= 1965–66 Bradford City A.F.C. season =

Bradford City A.F.C.
1965–66 season
- Ground: Valley Parade
- Fourth Division: 23rd (re-elected)
- FA Cup: First round
- League Cup: First round

The 1965–66 Bradford City A.F.C. season was the 53rd in the club's history.

The club finished 23rd in Division Four (and were re-elected to retain their Football League status), reached the 1st round of the FA Cup, and the 1st round of the League Cup.

== Sources ==
- Frost, Terry (1988). Bradford City A Complete Record 1903-1988. Breedon Books Sport. ISBN 0-907969-38-0.
