= 1969–70 Bradford City A.F.C. season =

Bradford City A.F.C.
1969–70 season
- Manager: Jimmy Wheeler
- Ground: Valley Parade
- Third Division: 10th
- FA Cup: Third round
- League Cup: Fourth round

The 1969–70 Bradford City A.F.C. season was the 57th in the club's history.

The club finished 10th in Division Three, reached the 3rd round of the FA Cup, and the 4th round of the League Cup.

== Sources ==
- Frost, Terry (1988). Bradford City A Complete Record 1903-1988. Breedon Books Sport. ISBN 0-907969-38-0.
