= 1935–36 Bradford City A.F.C. season =

Bradford City A.F.C.
1935–36 season
- Manager: Dick Ray
- Ground: Valley Parade
- Second Division: 12th
- FA Cup: Fifth round

The 1935–36 Bradford City A.F.C. season was the 29th in the club's history.

The club finished 12th in Division Two, and reached the 5th round of the FA Cup.

== Sources ==
- Frost, Terry (1988). Bradford City A Complete Record 1903-1988. Breedon Books Sport. ISBN 0-907969-38-0.
