= 1973–74 Bradford City A.F.C. season =

Bradford City A.F.C.
1973–74 season
- Manager: Bryan Edwards
- Ground: Valley Parade
- Fourth Division: 8th
- FA Cup: Fourth round
- League Cup: First round

The 1973–74 Bradford City A.F.C. season was the 61st in the club's history.

The club finished 8th in Division Four, reached the 4th round of the FA Cup, and the 1st round of the League Cup.

== Sources ==
- Frost, Terry (1988). Bradford City A Complete Record 1903-1988. Breedon Books Sport. ISBN 0-907969-38-0.
