= David Jackson (footballer, born 1937) =

English footballer (1937–2024)

Personal information
- Date of birth: 23 January 1937
- Place of birth: Stoke-on-Trent, England
- Date of death: 21 March 2024 (aged 87)
- Position: Inside forward

Senior career*
Years	Team	Apps	(Gls)
1954	Wrexham	7	(1)
1954–1955	Marine		
1955–1961	Bradford City	250	(61)
1961–1963	Tranmere Rovers	38	(5)
1963–1965	Halifax Town	66	(2)
- Frickley Colliery
- Altrincham
1968	Hyde United	14	(2)
- * Club domestic league appearances and goals

David Jackson (23 January 1937 – 21 March 2024) was an English footballer whose career mirrored his twin brother Peter's. He was an inside forward. The pair played at Wrexham and Bradford City where their father Peter Jackson was manager.

Jackson also excelled at golf and cricket, playing in the Yorkshire Council League. He died in March 2024, at the age of 87.

== Career ==
David Jackson was the younger of twin brothers. His brother was Peter, born 10 minutes earlier, and their father was also Peter. Both brothers started their career at Wrexham in 1954 where their father was manager. He soon left for Bradford City and the two brothers spent part of the season at Marine. In April 1955 they both re-signed for their father at Bradford.

Jackson's debut at City came on 20 April 1955 when he scored in a 4–0 win over Grimsby Town before he scored again ten days later again against Grimsby when Peter was handed his debut. They spent another six seasons at City, in which time Jackson, an inside forward missed just 18 games. Jackson was a consistent goal-scorer totting up between eight and 12 league goals in each of his full seasons at Valley Parade and being the club's top goal-scorer in 1957–58 when his 14 goals included three in the FA Cup. He received benefits in May 1960 and July 1961.

When their father was dismissed in March 1961, the brothers also immediately left to sign for Tranmere Rovers for a combined fee of £3,000. They had played a total of 449 league games between them scoring 76 goals for City. Their careers briefly parted when Jackson signed for Halifax Town two years later before they both played in non-league together at Frickley Colliery, Altrincham and Hyde United. David retired in 1968 to concentrate on a career in architecture.
