= 1970–71 Bradford City A.F.C. season =

Bradford City A.F.C.
1970–71 season
- Manager: Jimmy Wheeler
- Ground: Valley Parade
- Third Division: 19th
- FA Cup: Second round
- League Cup: First round

The 1970–71 Bradford City A.F.C. season was the 58th in the club's history.

The club finished 19th in Division Three, reached the 2nd round of the FA Cup, and the 1st round of the League Cup.

== Sources ==
- Frost, Terry (1988). Bradford City A Complete Record 1903-1988. Breedon Books Sport. ISBN 0-907969-38-0.
