= Fred Rhodes (footballer) =

English footballer

Personal information
- Full name: Fred Foster Rhodes
- Date of birth: 21 March 1904
- Place of birth: Gomersal, England
- Date of death: 1988 (aged 83–84)
- Height: 5 ft 7 1/2 in (1.71 m)
- Position: Centre forward

Senior career*
Years	Team	Apps	(Gls)
- Liversedge
1922–1926	Bradford City	52	(14)
- Poole Town
- * Club domestic league appearances and goals

Fred Foster Rhodes (21 March 1904 – 1988) was an English professional footballer whose career as a centre forward was spent at Bradford City.
