= 1964–65 Bradford City A.F.C. season =

Bradford City A.F.C.
1964–65 season
- Ground: Valley Parade
- Fourth Division: 19th
- FA Cup: First round
- League Cup: Fifth round

The 1964–65 Bradford City A.F.C. season was the 52nd in the club's history.

The club finished 19th in Division Four, reached the 1st round of the FA Cup, and the 5th round of the League Cup.

== Sources ==
- Frost, Terry (1988). Bradford City A Complete Record 1903-1988. Breedon Books Sport. ISBN 0-907969-38-0.
