= 1979–80 Bradford City A.F.C. season =

Bradford City A.F.C.
1979-80 season
- The Football League: 5th Place
- FA Cup: 3rd Round
- League Cup: 2nd Round

The 1979–80 Bradford City A.F.C. season was the 67th in the club's history.

The club finished 5th in Division Four, reached the 3rd round of the FA Cup, and the 2nd round of the League Cup.

== Sources ==
- Frost, Terry (1988). Bradford City A Complete Record 1903-1988. Breedon Books Sport. ISBN 0-907969-38-0.
