= 1930–31 Bradford City A.F.C. season =

Bradford City A.F.C.
1930–31 season
- Manager: Jack Peart
- Ground: Valley Parade
- Second Division: 10th
- FA Cup: Fourth round

The 1930–31 Bradford City A.F.C. season was the 24th in the club's history.

The club finished 10th in Division Two, and reached the 4th round of the FA Cup.

== Sources ==
- Frost, Terry (1988). Bradford City A Complete Record 1903-1988. Breedon Books Sport. ISBN 0-907969-38-0.
