= 1974–75 Bradford City A.F.C. season =

Bradford City A.F.C.
1974–75 season
- Ground: Valley Parade
- Fourth Division: 10th
- FA Cup: First round
- League Cup: Second round

The 1974–75 Bradford City A.F.C. season was the 62nd in the club's history.

The club finished 10th in Division Four, reached the 1st round of the FA Cup, and the 2nd round of the League Cup.

== Sources ==
- Frost, Terry (1988). Bradford City A Complete Record 1903-1988. Breedon Books Sport. ISBN 0-907969-38-0.
