= 1933–34 Bradford City A.F.C. season =

Bradford City A.F.C.
1933–34 season
- Manager: Jack Peart
- Ground: Valley Parade
- Second Division: 6th
- FA Cup: Third round

The 1933–34 Bradford City A.F.C. season was the 27th in the club's history.

The club finished 6th in Division Two, and reached the 3rd round of the FA Cup.

== Sources ==
- Frost, Terry (1988). Bradford City A Complete Record 1903-1988. Breedon Books Sport. ISBN 0-907969-38-0.
