= 1926–27 Bradford City A.F.C. season =

English football club season

The 1926–27 Bradford City A.F.C. season was the 20th in the club's history.

The club finished 22nd in Division Two, and reached the 3rd round of the FA Cup. The club was relegated to the Third Division North.

== Sources ==
- Frost, Terry (1988). Bradford City A Complete Record 1903-1988. Breedon Books Sport. ISBN 0-907969-38-0.
