= 1927–28 Bradford City A.F.C. season =

English football club season

The 1927–28 Bradford City A.F.C. season was the 21st in the club's history. The club finished 6th in Division Three North, and reached the 2nd round of the FA Cup. During the season the club suffered financial problems and were close to liquidation; they were saved by donations from fans.

== Sources ==
- Frost, Terry (1988). Bradford City A Complete Record 1903-1988. Breedon Books Sport. ISBN 0-907969-38-0.
