= 1948–49 Bradford City A.F.C. season =

Bradford City A.F.C.
1948–49 season
- Manager: David Steele
- Ground: Valley Parade
- Third Division North: 22nd
- FA Cup: Second round
Until December colours

The 1948–49 Bradford City A.F.C. season was the 36th in the club's history.

The club finished 22nd in Division Three North, and reached the 2nd round of the FA Cup.

The club had to be re-elected to maintain their Football League status for the first time in their history.

== Sources ==
- Frost, Terry (1988). Bradford City A Complete Record 1903-1988. Breedon Books Sport. ISBN 0-907969-38-0.
