= 1968–69 Bradford City A.F.C. season =

Bradford City A.F.C.
1968–69 season
- Ground: Valley Parade
- Fourth Division: 4th (promoted)
- FA Cup: First round
- League Cup: Second round

The 1968–69 Bradford City A.F.C. season was the 56th in the club's history.

The club finished 4th in Division Four (winning promotion to Division Three), reached the 1st round of the FA Cup, and the 2nd round of the League Cup.

== Sources ==
- Frost, Terry (1988). Bradford City A Complete Record 1903-1988. Breedon Books Sport. ISBN 0-907969-38-0.
