= 1914–15 Bradford City A.F.C. season =

English football club season

The 1914–15 Bradford City A.F.C. season was the 12th in the club's history.

The club finished 10th in Division One, and reached the 4th round of the FA Cup. Prior to the start of the season the club undertook a 10 match tour of continental Europe, the third such tour in their history, winning 9 games.

Pos	Team	Pld	W	D	L	GF	GA	GAv	Pts
9	Bradford (Park Avenue)	38	17	7	14	69	65	1.062	41
10	West Bromwich Albion	38	15	10	13	49	43	1.140	40
11	Bradford City	38	13	14	11	55	49	1.122	40
12	Middlesbrough	38	13	12	13	62	74	0.838	38
13	Liverpool	38	14	9	15	65	75	0.867	37

Source: World Football
Rules for classification: 1) Points; 2) Goal average; 3) Goals scored

== Sources ==
- Frost, Terry (1988). Bradford City A Complete Record 1903-1988. Breedon Books Sport. ISBN 0-907969-38-0.
