= 1971–72 Everton F.C. season =

English football club season

Everton
1971–72 season
- Manager: Harry Catterick
- Ground: Goodison Park
- First Division: 15th
- FA Cup: Fifth Round
- League Cup: Second Round
- Top goalscorer: League: Joe Royle, David Johnson (9); All: David Johnson (11)
Home colours	Away colours	Third colours

During the 1971–72 English football season, Everton F.C. competed in the Football League First Division. They finished 15th in the table with 36 points.

== Final league table ==
Pos	Team	Pld	W	D	L	GF	GA	GAv	Pts	Qualification or relegation
13	Ipswich Town	42	11	16	15	39	53	0.736	38	
14	West Ham United	42	12	12	18	47	51	0.922	36	
15	Everton	42	9	18	15	37	48	0.771	36	
16	West Bromwich Albion	42	12	11	19	42	54	0.778	35	
17	Stoke City	42	10	15	17	39	56	0.696	35	Qualification for the UEFA Cup first round

Source: World Football
Rules for classification: 1) Points; 2) Goal average; 3) Goals scored

== Results ==
Win	Draw	Loss

=== Football League First Division ===
Date	Opponent	Venue	Result	Attendance	Scorers
14 August 1971	Ipswich Town	A	0–0	23,757	
18 August 1971	West Bromwich Albion	A	0–2	32,055	
21 August 1971	Sheffield United	H	0–1	41,727	
24 August 1971	Chelsea	H	2–0	38,854	
28 August 1971	West Ham United	A	0–1	26,878	
31 August 1971	Manchester United	H	1–0	52,151	
4 September 1971	Derby County	H	0–2	41,024	
11 September 1971	Wolverhampton Wanderers	A	1–1	26,833	
18 September 1971	Arsenal	H	2–1	39,710	
25 September 1971	Crystal Palace	A	1–2	25,619	
2 October 1971	Coventry City	H	1–2	36,882	
9 October 1971	Manchester City	A	0–1	33,538	
16 October 1971	Ipswich Town	H	1–1	31,590	
23 October 1971	Leeds United	A	2–3	34,208	
30 October 1971	Newcastle United	H	1–0	38,811	
6 November 1971	Tottenham Hotspur	A	0–3	40,005	
13 November 1971	Liverpool	H	1–0	56,293	
20 November 1971	Southampton	H	8–0	28,718	
27 November 1971	Leicester City	A	0–0	29,662	
4 December 1971	Stoke City	H	0–0	35,463	
11 December 1971	Nottingham Forest	A	0–1	18,639	
18 December 1971	Derby County	A	0–2	27,895	
27 December 1971	Huddersfield Town	H	2–2	41,262	
1 January 1972	Arsenal	A	1–1	47,031	
8 January 1972	West Ham United	H	2–1	38,482	
22 January 1972	West Bromwich Albion	H	2–1	36,412	
29 January 1972	Chelsea	A	0–4	38,558	
12 February 1972	Leeds United	H	0–0	45,935	
19 February 1972	Newcastle United	A	0–0	29,584	
1 March 1972	Tottenham Hotspur	H	1–1	21,601	
4 March 1972	Liverpool	A	0–4	53,922	
8 March 1972	Manchester United	A	0–0	38,415	
11 March 1972	Manchester City	H	1–2	44,649	
18 March 1972	Sheffield United	A	1–1	28,244	
21 March 1972	Crystal Palace	H	0–0	27,979	
25 March 1972	Wolverhampton Wanderers	H	2–2	29,675	
1 April 1972	Huddersfield Town	A	0–0	17,265	
4 April 1972	Coventry City	A	1–4	22,129	
8 April 1972	Southampton	A	1–0	19,711	
15 April 1972	Leicester City	H	0–0	33,342	
22 April 1972	Stoke City	A	1–1	16,808	
2 May 1972	Nottingham Forest	H	1–1	21,513	

=== FA Cup ===
Round	Date	Opponent	Venue	Result	Attendance	Goalscorers
3	15 January 1972	Crystal Palace	A	2–2	32,331	
3:R	18 January 1972	Crystal Palace	H	3–2	45,408	
4	5 February 1972	Walsall	H	2–1	45,462	
5	26 February 1972	Tottenham Hotspur	H	0–2	50,511	

=== League Cup ===
Round	Date	Opponent	Venue	Result	Attendance	Goalscorers
2	7 September 1971	Southampton	A	1–2	17,833	
