= 1978–79 Bradford City A.F.C. season =

Bradford City A.F.C.
1978-79 season
- The Football League: 15th Place
- FA Cup: 2nd Round
- League Cup: 2nd Round

The 1978–79 Bradford City A.F.C. season was the 66th in the club's history.

The club finished 15th in Division Four, reached the 2nd round of the FA Cup, and the 2nd round of the League Cup.

== Sources ==
- Frost, Terry (1988). Bradford City A Complete Record 1903-1988. Breedon Books Sport. ISBN 0-907969-38-0.
