= 1931–32 Bradford City A.F.C. season =

Bradford City A.F.C.
1931–32 season
- Manager: Jack Peart
- Ground: Valley Parade
- Second Division: 7th
- FA Cup: Third round
- Biggest win: 9–1 v Barnsley, Division Two
- Biggest defeat: 1–6 v Millwall, Division Two

The 1931–32 Bradford City A.F.C. season was the 25th in the club's history.

The club finished 7th in Division Two, and reached the 3rd round of the FA Cup.

== Sources ==
- Frost, Terry (1988). Bradford City A Complete Record 1903-1988. Breedon Books Sport. ISBN 0-907969-38-0.
