= 1980–81 Bradford City A.F.C. season =

Bradford City A.F.C.
1980-81 season
- Division Four: 14th Place
- FA Cup: 1st Round
- League Cup: 2nd Round

The 1980–81 Bradford City A.F.C. season was the 68th in the club's history.

The club finished 14th in Division Four, reached the 1st round of the FA Cup, and the 2nd round of the League Cup.

Roy McFarland was appointed as the club's player-manager in May 1981.

== Sources ==
- Frost, Terry (1988). Bradford City A Complete Record 1903-1988. Breedon Books Sport. ISBN 0-907969-38-0.
