= 1939–40 Bradford City A.F.C. season =

Bradford City A.F.C.
1939–40 season
- Manager: Fred Westgarth
- Ground: Valley Parade

The 1939–40 Bradford City A.F.C. season was the 33rd in the club's history.

The Football League season was abandoned after 3 games due to the outbreak of World War II. At that time the club was in 21st position in the Third Division North; those records were expunged.

The club then played in several friendlies and in regional competitions. The club finished 6th in the Regional League North-East Division, out of 11 clubs, and reached the preliminary round of the Football League War Cup North.

== Sources ==
- Frost, Terry (1988). Bradford City A Complete Record 1903-1988. Breedon Books Sport. ISBN 0-907969-38-0.
