= George Murphy (footballer) =

Welsh footballer

Personal information
- Date of birth: 22 July 1915
- Place of birth: Wattsville, Wales
- Date of death: December 1983 (aged 68)
- Place of death: Tingley, England
- Height: 5 ft 9 in (1.75 m)
- Positions: Centre forward; full back

Youth career
- Pontllanfraith
- Cwmfelinfach Colts

Senior career*
Years	Team	Apps	(Gls)
1934–1947	Bradford City	180	(43)
1947–1948	Hull City	15	(9)
- Scunthorpe United
- Scarborough
- Goole

International career
	Wales (wartime)	2	
- * Club domestic league appearances and goals

George Murphy (22 July 1915 – December 1983) was a Welsh footballer who played in a variety of positions mainly centre forward or full back. He played twice for Wales during the Second World War internationals.

He also served in the RAF.

== Career ==
George Murphy started his footballing career in his native Wales with junior clubs Ponthlanfraith and Cwmfelinfach Juniors before signing for Bradford City in October 1934. He played in almost every position for Bradford under five different managers, particularly a centre forward and full back. He notably scored 11 goals in 1936–37 and 15, including one FA Cup goal, in 1946–47.

During the Second World War, he served with the RAF, guested for several clubs, including Bradford Park Avenue and even set a wartime record by playing for eight clubs in just nine weeks, and played twice in wartime internationals for Wales.

He remained at City for two seasons after the war, before being signed by Hull City in December 1947 for £1,500. He spent just eight months at Hull during which time he scored nine goals in 15 league appearances. He left in August 1948 for Midland League side Scunthorpe United before spells at Scarborough, where he was the club's top scorer in 1949–50 with 31 goals, and Goole.

He retired to become a publican in Humberside and then a club steward in Morley. He died through ill-health in December 1983 aged 68 at his home in Tingley.
