= 1961–62 Bradford City A.F.C. season =

Bradford City A.F.C.
1961–62 season
- Manager: Bob Brocklebank
- Ground: Valley Parade
- Fourth Division: 5th
- FA Cup: Third round
- League Cup: First round

The 1961–62 Bradford City A.F.C. season was the 49th in the club's history.

The club finished 5th in Division Four, reached the 3rd round of the FA Cup, and the 1st round of the League Cup.

During this season the club suffered a club record defeat against Colchester United, a league match away on 30 December 1961.

== Sources ==
- Frost, Terry (1988). Bradford City A Complete Record 1903-1988. Breedon Books Sport. ISBN 0-907969-38-0.
