= John Hallows =

English footballer

Personal information
- Full name: John Henry Hallows
- Date of birth: 16 February 1907
- Place of birth: Chester, England
- Date of death: August 1963 (aged 56)
- Height: 5 ft 8 in (1.73 m)
- Position: Centre forward

Senior career*
Years	Team	Apps	(Gls)
- Liverpool Bluecoats
- Willenhall Swifts
	West Bromwich Albion	0	(0)
- Grays Thurrock
1930–1936	Bradford City	164	(74)
1936–1937	Barnsley	13	(4)
- * Club domestic league appearances and goals

John Henry Hallows (16 February 1907 – August 1963) was an English professional footballer who played much of his career at Bradford City where he still is one of the club's top goal-scorers.

== Career ==
Hallows was born in Chester but moved to Liverpool as an orphan by the time he was five years old. He started his footballing career with Liverpool Bluecoats, then Willenhall Swifts, before moving to the Football League with West Bromwich Albion. He was released after just a few months and instead returned to non-league with Grays Thurrock. In November 1930 he was signed by Bradford City for £600. He finished his first two seasons at Valley Parade as the club's top goal-scorer with 19 and 21 goals respectively, all in the league, including five against Barnsley in a 9–1 triumph. He added another 29 goals in his next two seasons, but just five in his final two. His appearances in his last season, however, were restricted because of a two-month suspension imposed after being sent off in a Midland League game against Rotherham United.

He left Bradford for Barnsley in March 1936, having spent his entire Bradford career in Division Two and amassed 74 league goals and five in the FA Cup in a total of 173 appearances. But he made just 13 league appearances, scoring four goals, at Barnsley before he retired.

He set up his own tailoring trade in Walkden, near Bolton, before he died in August 1963.
