= 1910–11 Bradford City A.F.C. season =

Bradford City A.F.C.
1910–11 season
- Manager: Peter O'Rourke
- Ground: Valley Parade
- First Division: 5th
- FA Cup: Winners

The 1910–11 Bradford City A.F.C. season was the eighth in the club's history.

The club finished 5th in Division One, and won the FA Cup, beating Newcastle United in the 1911 FA Cup Final. The club was presented with a new flag and mast by supporters, and the club went on a three-match tour of Scandinavia.

== Sources ==
- Frost, Terry (1988). Bradford City A Complete Record 1903-1988. Breedon Books Sport. ISBN 0-907969-38-0.
