= Jack Deakin (footballer, born 1912) =

English footballer

Personal information
- Full name: John Deakin
- Date of birth: 29 September 1912
- Place of birth: Altofts, England
- Date of death: January 2001 (aged 88)
- Position: Centre forward

Senior career*
Years	Team	Apps	(Gls)
19xx–1936	Altofts WRC		
1936–1939	Bradford City	62	(45)
- * Club domestic league appearances and goals

John Deakin (29 September 1912 – January 2001) was an English footballer who played as a centre forward in the English Football League for Bradford City.

Deakin was born in Altofts, Yorkshire.
