= 1952–53 Bradford City A.F.C. season =

Bradford City A.F.C.
1952–53 season
- Manager: Ivor Powell
- Ground: Valley Parade
- Third Division North: 16th
- FA Cup: Second round

The 1952–53 Bradford City A.F.C. season was the 40th in the club's history.

The club finished 16th in Division Three North, and reached the 2nd round of the FA Cup.

== Sources ==
- Frost, Terry (1988). Bradford City A Complete Record 1903-1988. Breedon Books Sport. ISBN 0-907969-38-0.
