= 1977–78 Bradford City A.F.C. season =

Bradford City A.F.C.
1977-78 season
- The Football League: 22nd Place (relegated)
- FA Cup: 1st Round
- League Cup: 1st Round

The 1977–78 Bradford City A.F.C. season was the 65th in the club's history.

The club finished 22nd in Division Three, being relegated to Division Four, reached the 1st round of the FA Cup, and the 1st round of the League Cup.

The club was relegated to Division Four after just one season in Division Three.

== Sources ==
- Frost, Terry (1988). Bradford City A Complete Record 1903-1988. Breedon Books Sport. ISBN 0-907969-38-0.
