= 1913–14 Bradford City A.F.C. season =

English football club season

The 1913–14 Bradford City A.F.C. season was the 11th in the club's history.

The club finished 9th in Division One, and reached the 2nd round of the FA Cup.

Pos	Team	Pld	W	D	L	GF	GA	GAv	Pts
7	Sunderland	38	17	6	15	63	52	1.212	40
8	Chelsea	38	16	7	15	46	55	0.836	39
9	Bradford City	38	12	14	12	40	40	1.000	38
10	Sheffield United	38	16	5	17	63	60	1.050	37
11	Newcastle United	38	13	11	14	39	48	0.813	37

Source: World Football
Rules for classification: 1) Points; 2) Goal average; 3) Goals scored

== Sources ==
- Frost, Terry (1988). Bradford City A Complete Record 1903-1988. Breedon Books Sport. ISBN 0-907969-38-0.
