= 1932–33 Bradford City A.F.C. season =

Bradford City A.F.C.
1932–33 season
- Manager: Jack Peart
- Ground: Valley Parade
- Second Division: 11th
- FA Cup: Third round

The 1932–33 Bradford City A.F.C. season was the 26th in the club's history.

The club finished 11th in Division Two, and reached the 3rd round of the FA Cup.

== Sources ==
- Frost, Terry (1988). Bradford City A Complete Record 1903-1988. Breedon Books Sport. ISBN 0-907969-38-0.
