= 1953–54 Bradford City A.F.C. season =

Bradford City A.F.C.
1953–54 season
- Manager: Ivor Powell
- Ground: Valley Parade
- Third Division North: 5th
- FA Cup: First round

The 1953–54 Bradford City A.F.C. season was the 41st in the club's history.

The club finished 5th in Division Three North, and reached the 1st round of the FA Cup.

== Sources ==
- Frost, Terry (1988). Bradford City A Complete Record 1903-1988. Breedon Books Sport. ISBN 0-907969-38-0.
