= 1912–13 Bradford City A.F.C. season =

English football club season

The 1912–13 Bradford City A.F.C. season was the 10th in the club's history.

The club finished 13th in Division One, and reached the 1st round of the FA Cup.

== Sources ==
- Frost, Terry (1988). Bradford City A Complete Record 1903-1988. Breedon Books Sport. ISBN 0-907969-38-0.
