= 1976–77 Bradford City A.F.C. season =

Bradford City A.F.C.
1976-77 season
- The Football League: 4th Place (promoted)
- FA Cup: 1st Round
- League Cup: 2nd Round

The 1976–77 Bradford City A.F.C. season was the 64th in the club's history.

The club finished 4th in Division Four, winning a promotion to Division Three, they reached the 1st round of the FA Cup, and the 2nd round of the League Cup.

== Sources ==
- Frost, Terry (1988). Bradford City A Complete Record 1903-1988. Breedon Books Sport. ISBN 0-907969-38-0.
