= Ivor Powell =

Welsh football player and manager (1916–2012)

Ivor Powell MBE
Personal information
- Full name: Ivor Verdun Powell
- Date of birth: 5 July 1916
- Place of birth: Bargoed, Wales
- Date of death: 6 November 2012 (aged 96)
- Position: Left-half

Youth career
- Bargoed Thursdays

Senior career*
Years	Team	Apps	(Gls)
- Barnet
1937–1948	Queens Park Rangers	110	(2)
1948–1951	Aston Villa	79	(5)
1951	Port Vale	6	(0)
1951–1952	Barry Town	13	(4)
1952–1954	Bradford City	83	(9)
Total		291+	(20+)

International career
1946–1950	Wales	8	(0)
	Wales Wartime	4	(0)

Managerial career
- 1951: Port Vale
- 1952–1955: Bradford City
- 1960–1963: Carlisle United
- 1964–1967: Bath City
- 1968: PAOK
- * Club domestic league appearances and goals

Ivor Verdun Powell, MBE (5 July 1916 – 6 November 2012) was a Welsh football player and manager. He won eight caps for Wales.

A wing half, he began his professional career with Queens Park Rangers in September 1937. His career was interrupted by World War II, though he returned to QPR to help them to the Third Division South title in 1947–48. He moved to Aston Villa for £17,500 in December 1948, and played 79 games in the First Division. He was appointed player-manager at Port Vale in July 1951, though he was sacked after just four months. He was appointed Bradford City manager in 1952 but was again unsuccessful and departed in February 1955. He did find success at Carlisle United following his appointment in 1960, leading the club to promotion out of the Fourth Division in 1961–62. He left the club in 1963 and later managed Bath City before becoming a coach.

He was inducted to the Welsh Sports Hall of Fame in 2004 alongside snooker player Terry Griffiths and cricketer Tony Lewis. He also entered the Guinness Book of World Records as the oldest working football coach on his 90th birthday after 55 years as a coach. He retired on 26 May 2010, aged 93. Ivor was the father of Barry Powell.

== Club career ==
=== Queens Park Rangers ===
Powell was a seventh son of a seventh son and started his working life down the mines, alongside his father and six brothers for a wage of two shillings a day. His playing career began with South Wales League side Bargoed Thursdays. To his delight, in August 1936 he was invited to London to have a trial with Queens Park Rangers, making him "so happy to leave that wretched [coal] pit". This was unsuccessful but Powell stayed in London and got a job. He started playing for the reserve team of Barnet and, in May 1937, played in a friendly game against QPR. Powell was the outstanding player in the game, and Barnet won 8–1. This time, the Rangers took real interest. Joining QPR on professional terms under Billy Birrell in September 1937, the club finished third in the Third Division South, missing out on promotion as they finished three points below champions Millwall. They finished sixth in 1938–39, the first full season before the outbreak of World War II.

During the war, he guested for Bradford City and Blackpool whilst working as an RAF physical trainer. At Blackpool, he struck up a friendship with Stanley Matthews, who later became Powell's best man at his wedding to Joan Browell in 1943.

He returned to Loftus Road after the war and helped QPR to finish as the Third Division South runners-up in 1946–47, though only the team that finished first were promoted into the Second Division. They managed to finish as champions in 1947–48 under Dave Mangnall's stewardship to win promotion finally. He played 159 league and cup games for the club.

=== Aston Villa ===
On 15 December 1948, the tough tackler commanded a £17,500 transfer fee; this was a record for a half back and for both the buying and selling clubs when he moved to Aston Villa. Manager Alex Massie appointed him as club captain. He played another 79 First Division games for Villa in 1948–49, 1949–50, and 1950–51, before he was appointed player-manager at Port Vale in July 1951.

== International career ==
Powell made eight international caps for Wales and won four wartime caps. In one game he was replaced by Englishman Stan Mortensen in a game between England and Wales when his injury left the Welsh side without an available substitute.

== Management career ==
=== Port Vale ===
At Port Vale, as player-manager, he played just six times, restricted on the field by a knee injury. As a manager, he tried to 'rule by fear' and was not well-liked by the players; with the club bottom of the Third Division South, his contract was terminated in November 1951. Roy Sproson later said that "everything seemed to go wrong for him at Vale" and that "he used to treat players like kids". Powell stated that all of the club's funds had been spent on completing Vale Park but that "I thought if I increased the fitness of the squad and worked on their diet I could knock them into shape". Injuries affected the squad and top-scorer Cliff Pinchbeck "disappeared for the first weeks of the season".

"He was a good, clean-living man who was always fair with me. He was a sergeant major-type as a manager. The first time he called me into his office, his first words were 'I'm the boss' and I thought 'Oh heck'. He had been a tremendous player, although I remember him coming unstuck in one training session on the pitch when he was trying to coach our winger, Mick Hulligan. Mick's free kicks hadn't been too clever that day, so Ivor said, 'Right, let me show you'. Ivor put the ball down just outside the penalty area, took a run-up and, as we all watched, he blasted the ball right out of the ground and off down Hamil Road. He did his best to recover the situation though. He turned around to Mick and said, 'Now, you see, that's what you were doing'. Football is a results business and, unfortunately, we weren't getting those results when Ivor was there. I remember being in the dressing room when he came in to the ground to see our chairman, William Holdcroft. We guessed he was being shown the door. On his way out he stopped and said to us: 'I may be back one day'. The chairman shouted: 'Oh no you won't'. Ivor was a disciplinarian at Vale, but that's not a criticism. I think it was his first job in management and he just didn't have the success with us."

— Port Vale winger Colin Askey noted that Powell's first job in management was a steep learning curve.

=== Bradford City ===
Powell moved to Barry Town before being appointed the new Bradford City manager, again as player-manager, before the start of the 1952–53 season. His first season at Valley Parade was disappointing as they slipped to 16th in Third Division North. The following season, they came fifth but were 16 points shy of the promotion places. During that season he missed the first penalty of his career in a home fixture with Workington. The following season, he was carried off with knee ligament damage against Wrexham. The injury ended his playing career. City's form also struggled, and Powell left in February 1955 after a run of seven straight defeats and just two wins from 19 games without his presence on the field. City were forced to apply for re-election at the end of the campaign.

=== Carlisle United ===
Powell became a trainer-coach at Don Revie's Leeds United, and also had a coaching spell at PAOK in Greece before he returned to management with Carlisle United in May 1960, succeeding Andy Beattie. He led the "Cumbrians" to their first promotion when they finished fourth in the Fourth Division in 1961–62. He instilled discipline at Brunton Park, and signed players such as Peter McConnell, Reg Davies, Terry Caldwell, and Jack Marsden. He left the following season, with the club struggling in the league and knocked out of the FA Cup by Southern League side Gravesend & Northfleet.

=== Bath ===
Powell became manager of Bath City in 1964 and then a member of the coaching staff at Team Bath (University of Bath), where he worked for over 30 years, before becoming a coach at the same club. At 93, Powell announced his retirement as the "world's oldest football coach" in May 2010.

He was inducted into the Welsh Sports Hall of Fame in 2004. In 2006, while assistant coach for Team Bath at the University of Bath, he celebrated his 90th birthday and entered the Guinness Book of World Records as the oldest working football coach. He later became the club president. He completed 53 years as an FA accredited coach. In 1993, he was awarded an Honorary Degree (MA) by the University of Bath.

He was appointed a Member of the Order of the British Empire (MBE) in the 2008 New Year Honours for his services to sport and was presented with his award by Queen Elizabeth II on 25 June 2008, a few days short of his 92nd birthday. He described receiving the award as "an honour and a privilege."

"Aggression, determination, the will to win. These have always been my watchwords, and they still are. That's what I try to instil into these youngsters. And they listen, they really do."

— Speaking in 2007, Powell explained his philosophy to The Independent.

In 2010, he launched "The Ivor Powell Sports Scholarship Fund" at the University of Bath to provide scholarships for future undergraduates who are academically gifted and in their chosen sport. This scholarship is administered by University of Bath Development and Alumni Relations.

== Career statistics ==
=== Playing statistics ===
Appearances and goals by club, season and competition
Club	Season	League			FA Cup		Division Cup		Total	
Club	Season	Division	Apps	Goals	Apps	Goals	Apps	Goals	Apps	Goals
Queens Park Rangers	1938–39	Third Division South	8	0	0	0	2	0	10	0
Queens Park Rangers	1946–47	Third Division South	41	1	6	0	—		47	1
Queens Park Rangers	1947–48	Third Division South	41	1	6	0	—		47	1
Queens Park Rangers	1948–49	Second Division	20	0	0	0	—		20	0
Queens Park Rangers	Total		110	2	12	0	2	0	124	2
Aston Villa	1948–49	First Division	20	0	4	0	—		24	0
Aston Villa	1949–50	First Division	42	3	3	0	—		45	3
Aston Villa	1950–51	First Division	17	2	0	0	—		17	2
Aston Villa	Total		79	5	7	0	0	0	86	5
Port Vale	1951–52	Third Division South	6	0	0	0	—		6	0
Bradford City	1952–53	Third Division North	36	3	3	0	—		39	3
Bradford City	1953–54	Third Division North	39	5	2	0	—		41	5
Bradford City	1954–55	Third Division North	8	1	0	0	—		8	1
Bradford City	Total		83	9	5	0	0	0	88	9
Career total			278	16	24	0	2	0	304	16

A. The "Other" column constitutes appearances and goals in the League Cup, Football League Trophy, English Football League play-offs and Full Members Cup.

=== International statistics ===
Wales national team
Year	Apps	Goals
1946	1	0
1947	2	0
1948	1	0
1949	3	0
1950	1	0
Total	8	0

=== Managerial statistics ===
Managerial record by team and tenure
Team	From	To	Record				
Team	From	To	P	W	D	L	Win %
Port Vale	14 June 1951	1 December 1951	19	2	8	9	10.5
Bradford City	31 May 1952	1 February 1955	128	46	37	45	35.9
Carlisle United	31 May 1960	1 February 1963	92	47	30	15	51.1
Total			278	95	75	108	34.2

== Honours ==
Individual

- Welsh Sports Hall of Fame: 2004

=== As a player ===
Queens Park Rangers

- Football League Third Division South: 1947–48

=== As a manager ===
Carlisle United

- Football League Fourth Division fourth-place promotion: 1961–62
