= Stafford Heginbotham =

British businessman and football club executive

Stafford Heginbotham (12 September 1933 – 21 April 1995) was a British businessman who was chairman of Bradford City football club at the time when 56 people died in the Bradford City stadium fire. The fire occurred immediately after the club won league promotion, which mandated a costly upgrading of spectator facilities. A book published in 2015 revealed the extent of Heginbotham's fire insurance claims before the disaster, which had led to him being the subject of local innuendo about arson. In the light of the book's revelations, the former head of the public inquiry into the disaster maintained that there was still no reason to think there had been anything sinister about the fire, although he acknowledged that Heginbotham's serial insurance claims were cause for suspicion.

== Early career ==
In the mid-1950s Heginbotham worked as a salesman for a soft furnishings company, and by the age of 24 he was regarded as the firm's best salesman. He married Lorna Silverwood and had two sons. Heginbotham created the "Stafford Heginbotham Castle Trophy Highest Aggregate Wickets" in the Bradford Cricket League.

=== Toy manufacturer ===
In 1971 Heginbotham set up the Bradford-based company Tebro Toys. Six years later the Bradford Telegraph & Argus quoted Heginbotham as saying "I have just been unlucky" after the business suffered two major fires in succession. One was found to have been started by children. Heginbotham claimed the equivalent of £3 million for the destruction of the premises and a large amount of stock just before Christmas. He did not use the insurance proceeds to reopen the business, despite Bradford City Council's attempts to save the company and a proposed merger with a Welsh-based toy company. It is a matter of dispute how seriously innuendo about Heginbotham being a serial arsonist and insurance fraudster was meant, but when Bradford businessmen in the 1970s saw smoke in the sky they joked "That will be one of Stafford's."

=== Bradford City ===
Heginbotham became chairman of Bradford City A.F.C., where he was a popular figure. The "City Gent", the official mascot for the club introduced by Heginbotham in 1966, was modelled on him. He is credited with saying that "Football is the opera of the people." Former player John Hendrie recalled that: "We all lived in each other's pockets back then. Stafford Heginbotham would come in the dressing room before a game and offer us £200 for a few drinks that night if we won. We wouldn't see him again until 2.50 pm the following week and he'd make it double or quits. Looking at his 'syrup' [wig], we'd always ask when he was going to pay (toupee) – it would go straight over his head!"

In his autobiography, The Real McCall, former player Stuart McCall wrote of agreeing a tax-free payment with Stafford Heginbotham that was not honoured by Jack Tordoff. McCall took the club to the Football League and, after a second hearing, won his case. Speaking about the issue, Jack Tordoff stated: "Stuart was very close to Stafford Heginbotham, and he and Stuart arranged a deal while they were on a club end-of-season holiday. Stuart signed a three-year contract, but Stafford promised him privately that if we didn't get promotion he could leave the club. Stafford also promised him a signing-on fee of £50,000, and that went into his contract, but Stafford didn't tell the board that this sum was tax-free. At the end of the season we allowed Stuart to break his contract and leave for Everton to further his career because a promise had been made to him. Stuart took us to a tribunal. The tribunal ruled in favour of the club, but Stuart appealed against this decision and got Stafford to go with him. Stafford told the tribunal he had promised a tax-free payment to Stuart so the club paid up on the same day."

==== Stadium fire ====
In the penultimate game of the 1984–85 season the club had secured promotion to Division Two, thereby making the replacement of existing spectator terracing, which dated from 1911, a necessary expense under safety regulations. Heginbotham received an estimate of £2 million for the construction of a new stand. According to Martin Fletcher, Heginbotham lacked the financial resources to pay for new terracing, and was at that time having difficulty meeting the wage bill and running costs at the club.

Just before half time in the final game of the season a fire started at one end of the stand that would have to be replaced. The wooden structure was quickly ablaze. Heat and thick smoke meant that spectators had only minutes to escape. Half of the 56 people who died in the blaze were either under 20 or over 70 years old. Hundreds were injured, and many of the survivors required plastic surgery.

Interviewed immediately afterwards, Heginbotham, who had been in the director's box about 50 yards away from where the fire started, said that he thought two flares or smoke bombs had gone off shortly before. The wooden stand had been used for decades and hundreds of supporters smoked cigarettes or pipes. An inquiry allegedly heard from a man and his nephew who had been seated near the apparent origin of the blaze, and concluded that a lit cigarette had fallen through gaps in the floor and ignited accumulated paper rubbish, although there was no testimony suggesting who could have been responsible.

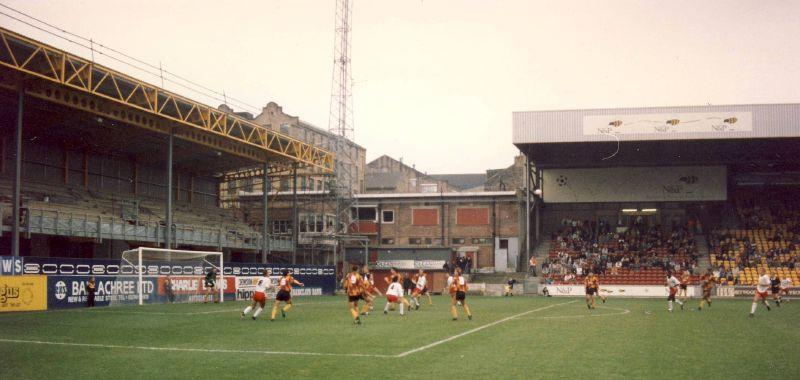
The new facilities at Bradford City's Valley Parade ground 1986

Bradford City received insurance proceeds and local government grants totalling £7 million in today's terms to rebuild facilities. Before the disaster the club, which had been seeking to comply with grant-issuing bodies in order to secure funding, had carried out some safety work on the stand after Heginbotham was warned by the local authority of the danger of a cigarette falling through the flooring and igniting rubbish. An article by Paul Foot in the Daily Mirror catalogued five previous fires at businesses owned by or linked to Heginbotham, and suggested that in view of his previous experience it was odd that he had failed to act on the fire officers' warnings. Heginbotham threatened to sue, and Foot dropped the story. In the aftermath of the Bradford deaths Heginbotham's reputation for deliberately setting fires received little or no mention in the local press, despite an accusatory graffiti campaign targeting his businesses.

=== Hotelier ===
Heginbotham resigned after the disaster, but returned for a second spell as chairman before leaving in January 1988. Following the sale of his shares in the club, Heginbotham converted his home in Tong into the Tong Village Hotel, which opened in 1989. In 1990 he sold the hotel in a shares transaction deal to Whitbread, receiving a million shares. He then moved to Jersey as a tax exile.

=== Death ===
Heginbotham died in 1995, following a heart transplant operation at St George's Hospital in Tooting. He was 61. His funeral was held at Bradford Cathedral in early May 1995 and he was interred at Undercliffe Cemetery, overlooking Valley Parade.

== Bradford Stadium fire controversy ==
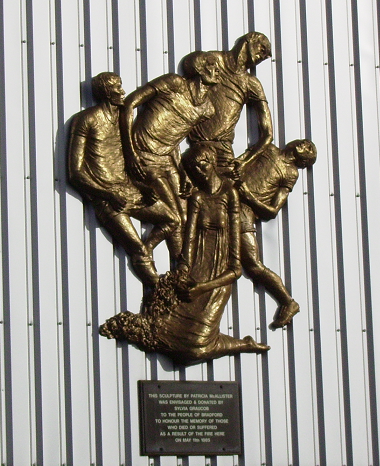
A memorial, erected on the club's main stand, to the victims of the fire in 1985

Shortly before the 30th anniversary of the disaster Martin Fletcher, whose father, brother, uncle and grandfather died in the stadium fire, published Fifty-Six: The Story of the Bradford Fire. In it Fletcher pointed to Heginbotham's proceeds from insurance payouts for eight business premises that had burned down between 1967 and 1981. Fletcher alleged that Heginbotham had recouped £10 million at today's values in insurance before the stadium fire. His total compensation for fires including the burning down of the stand amounted to the equivalent of £27 million at current values.

Oliver Popplewell, the judge who conducted the inquiry into the stadium deaths, acknowledged that the new information supplied in the book was grounds for being "highly suspicious" about some of Heginbotham's dealings, but he stood by the inquiry's conclusion that the fire in the stand had been an accident.

In interviews and in a documentary for BBC Television a former detective who had been involved with the inquiry into the stadium fire asserted that a man, since deceased, had admitted to accidentally dropping a cigarette and starting the fire. However, the man's nephew, who had been with him at the disaster and also testified to the inquiry, insisted that his uncle had made no such admission, at the time or subsequently.
