= 1911–12 Bradford City A.F.C. season =

Bradford City A.F.C.
1911–12 season
- Manager: Peter O'Rourke
- Ground: Valley Parade
- First Division: 11th
- FA Cup: Fourth round

The 1911–12 Bradford City A.F.C. season was the ninth in the club's history.

The club finished 11th in Division One, and reached the 4th round of the FA Cup, losing to Barnsley after four games.

== Sources ==
- Frost, Terry (1988). Bradford City A Complete Record 1903-1988. Breedon Books Sport. ISBN 0-907969-38-0.
