= Peter Jackson (footballer, born 1905) =

English footballer and manager (1905–1986)

Personal information
- Full name: Wilbert Jackson
- Date of birth: 4 August 1905
- Place of birth: Luddendenfoot, Halifax, England
- Date of death: 9 May 1986 (aged 80)
- Position: Half back

Youth career
- Luddendonfoot
- Hebden Bridge

Senior career*
Years	Team	Apps	(Gls)
1924–1934	Stoke City	72	(1)
1934–1935	Southend United	3	(0)

Managerial career
- 1950–1954: Wrexham
- 1955–1961: Bradford City
- * Club domestic league appearances and goals

Wilbert "Peter" Jackson (4 August 1905 – 9 May 1986) was an English football player and manager. He played for Southend United and Stoke City and managed Bradford City and Wrexham. His twin sons Peter and David were also professional footballers. Both played under their father at Wrexham and Bradford City.

== Playing career ==
Born in Luddendenfoot, Halifax, Jackson started his career in local football his hometown club and then Hebden Bridge before joining Football League side Stoke City in 1924. He became a very useful back-up player in Tom Mather's but could only manage a few matches consecutively as he suffered with leg spasms. As a result, he averaged around ten games per season but he did play in 22 matches in 1930–31. In total Jackson spent ten seasons at the Victoria Ground making 74 appearances scoring once which came in a 3–1 win over Southampton on 25 March 1933. In 1934, he moved to Southend United but after just three games he returned to the Stoke City in the role as assistant manager.

== Managerial career ==
Jackson's return to the Victoria Ground was as assistant manager to the club's new manager Bob McGrory in 1935, a position he held until 1939. In November 1950, he took his first full managerial role at Wrexham. He made history by giving debuts to his twin sons Peter and David.

Jackson Senior moved to Bradford City in February 1955 after Ivor Powell was sacked. Both his sons followed him from Wales to West Yorkshire. City were forced to apply for re-election in Jackson's first season following a poor run of form under Powell. Jackson's first full season saw the team come 8th in Third Division (North) followed by a 9th-place finish in 1956–57. In 1957–58 the club recorded its best post-war position by coming third. He was asked to manage the Third Division North representative team in October 1957.

The leagues were re-organised the following season and City's positions dropped to 11th and 19th in Division Three before the club were relegated in 1960–61. Jackson left the club in March 1961. His two sons left with him. Peter Junior had played 199 league games, and David 250 scoring 61 goals. The pair moved to Tranmere Rovers.

Jackson Senior returned to Stoke City as a scout. In March 1969 he moved back to Bradford again as a scout.

== Career statistics ==
=== Player ===
Appearances and goals by club, season and competition
Club	Season	League			FA Cup		Total	
Club	Season	Division	Apps	Goals	Apps	Goals	Apps	Goals
Stoke City	1924–25	Second Division	10	0	0	0	10	0
Stoke City	1925–26	Second Division	10	0	0	0	10	0
Stoke City	1926–27	Third Division North	1	0	1	0	2	0
Stoke City	1927–28	Second Division	4	0	0	0	4	0
Stoke City	1928–29	Second Division	10	0	0	0	10	0
Stoke City	1929–30	Second Division	6	0	0	0	6	0
Stoke City	1930–31	Second Division	21	0	1	0	22	0
Stoke City	1931–32	Second Division	1	0	0	0	1	0
Stoke City	1932–33	Second Division	3	1	0	0	3	1
Stoke City	1933–34	First Division	6	0	0	0	6	0
Stoke City	Total		72	1	2	0	74	1
Southend United	1934–35	Third Division South	3	0	0	0	3	0
Career total			75	1	2	0	77	1

=== Manager ===
Team	From	To	Record				
Team	From	To	G	W	D	L	Win %
Wrexham	November 1950	February 1954	116	68	34	64	58.62
Bradford City	February 1955	March 1961	305	118	80	107	38.69
Total			421	186	114	171	44.18

== Honours ==
Stoke City

- Football League Third Division North champions: 1926–27
- Football League Second Division champions: 1932–33
