= Jimmy Speirs =

Scottish footballer (1886–1917)

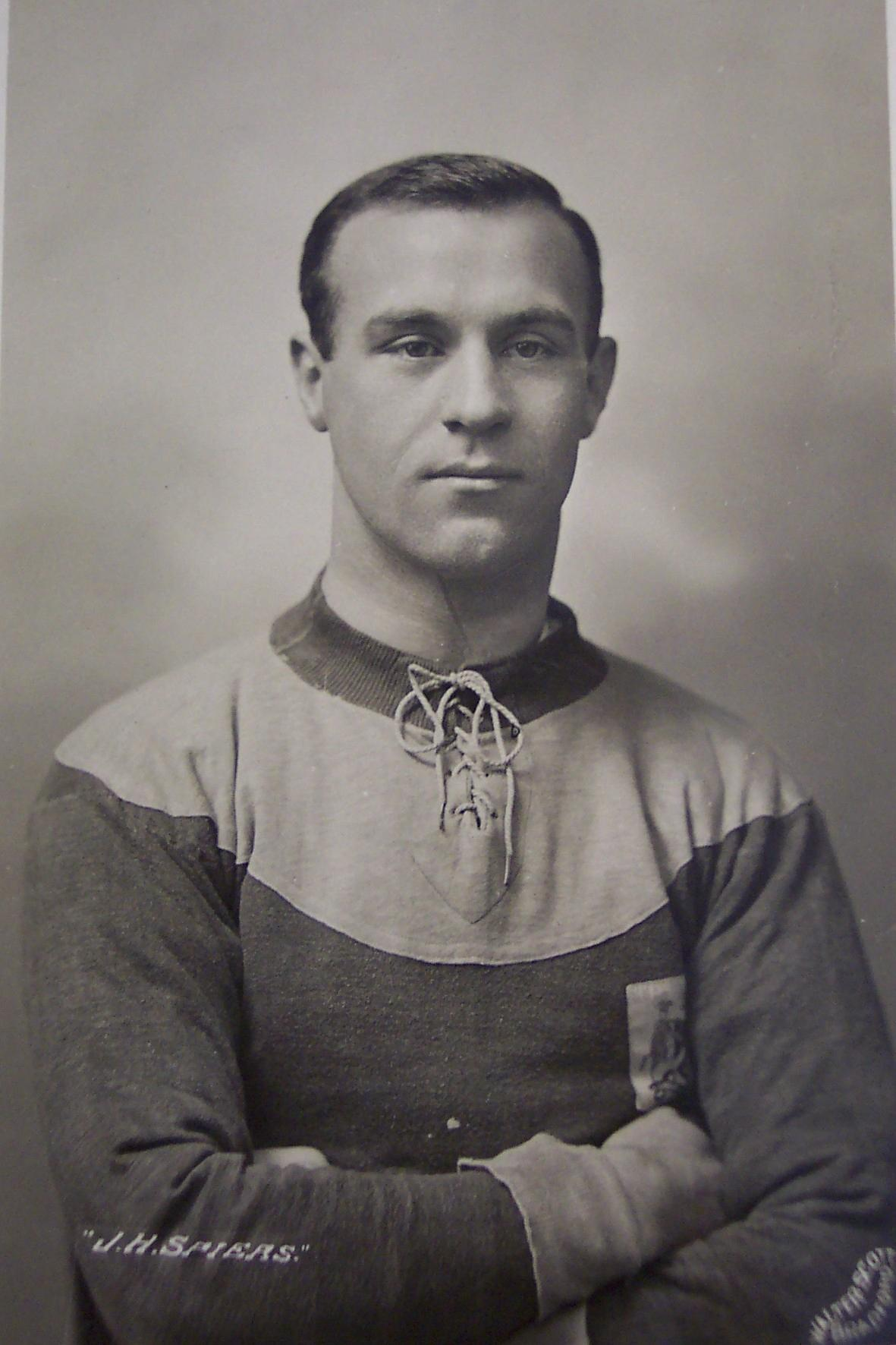
- Speirs in his Bradford City kit in 1911

Personal information
- Full name: James Hamilton Speirs
- Date of birth: 22 March 1886
- Place of birth: Govan, Scotland
- Date of death: 20 August 1917 (aged 31)
- Place of death: Passchendaele salient, Belgium
- Height: 5 ft 10 3/4 in (1.80 m)
- Position: Inside forward

Youth career
- 1904–1905: Annandale

Senior career*
Years	Team	Apps	(Gls)
1905	Maryhill		
1905–1908	Rangers	53	(24)
1908–1909	Clyde	14	(7)
1909–1912	Bradford City	86	(29)
1912–1915	Leeds City	73	(32)
Total		226	(92)

International career
1908	Scotland	1	(0)
- * Club domestic league appearances and goals

James Hamilton Speirs MM (22 March 1886 – 20 August 1917) was a Scottish footballer who represented his country on one occasion, scored the winning goal in the 1911 FA Cup Final, and received the Military Medal during the First World War.

Born in Glasgow, he worked as a clerk while playing youth football for Annandale. He started his adult football career with local junior team Maryhill, where he played for less than a season, before he moved to Rangers in 1905. He spent three years with the club, but won only the Glasgow Merchants' Charity Cup, before he joined a third Glasgow side Clyde. After one season, he left Clyde and Scotland, and joined Bradford City for their second season in the First Division. His greatest success came in his second season with Bradford, when he was the club's captain and goalscorer in their FA Cup Final victory of 1911, in a team featuring eight Scottish-born players.

He spent another two seasons with Bradford City, before he joined Leeds City, but after two seasons, the First World War broke out. League football continued for one more season, at the end of which Speirs returned to Glasgow.

Married with two young children, Speirs would have been exempt from conscription, but he volunteered to join the Queen's Own Cameron Highlanders in 1915. He was promoted to lance corporal, corporal and sergeant, and won the Military Medal for bravery in the field, but was killed during the Battle of Passchendaele in August 1917, at the age of 31.

== Early life ==
Speirs was born on 22 March 1886 in the Govan area of Glasgow, Scotland, the fifth of six children of James Hamilton Speirs and Janet Shields Speirs (née McLean). By 1901, the family had moved to nearby Govanhill and Jimmy worked as a clerk. It was in Govanhill that Speirs' football ability was first shown, when he played in the junior football circuit on the black ash pitches of Glasgow, for Annandale, during summer tournaments.

== Football career ==
=== Scotland ===
An inside forward, Speirs moved to Maryhill in the Glasgow Junior League in 1905. Maryhill, whose Lochburn Park ground was five miles north of Speirs' home, were among the top sides in the junior leagues, and lifted 13 trophies in eight seasons at the turn of the 20th century.

The 1904–05 team contained six junior internationals, and the side won three titles that season. Speirs' first recorded scoring appearance was on 29 April 1905, when his two goals helped Maryhill beat Parkhead 2–0. Speirs scored again in a 3–3 draw against Ashfield in the Glasgow Junior Cup final and scored the only goal of the replay to help Maryhill win the competition. Maryhill also won the Glasgow Merchants Charity Cup and the league title although it is unknown if Speirs played in the cup final or picked up a league winners medal.

At the end of the season, Speirs and junior international John McFie both moved across Glasgow to First Division side Rangers, who had finished second to city rivals Celtic after losing out in a title play-off. Speirs did not make his full debut until 25 September 1905, when Rangers lost 5–0 to Heart of Midlothian at Ibrox. Speirs scored his first Rangers goal two weeks later during the next league game in a 4–1 win away to Port Glasgow.

In his first season, Speirs scored a hat-trick in a 7–1 Scottish Cup first round victory over Second Division Arthurlie and won the Glasgow Merchants' Charity Cup, during which he scored twice in both the semi-final and final. However, Rangers could only finish fourth in the league, with Celtic retaining the title. Rangers improved to third place the following season as Speirs finished joint top scorer with 13 goals, but Celtic again were league winners. Celtic also defeated Rangers 3–0 in the Scottish Cup in front of 60,000 fans. Rangers' only trophy that season was the successful defence of the Merchants' Charity Cup, but Speirs did not play.

In 1907–08, Celtic once again finished top, with Rangers in third, and knocked their rivals out of the Scottish Cup. The two teams also met in the final of the Glasgow Cup, with Celtic winning in the second replay. Speirs was limited to 13 games, none of which Rangers lost, and he left after playing 62 matches, from which he scored 29 goals. During his final days with Rangers, he also won his only cap for Scotland, in a 2–1 win over Wales on 7 March 1908. Speirs won a representative cap 11 days later, when he played and scored for Glasgow during an inter-city fixture with Sheffield. The game finished 2–2.

In the summer of 1908, after three years with Rangers, Speirs moved to another Glasgow-based club, Clyde, which later played in the First Division. Clyde's Shawfield Park ground was three miles from Speirs' home in Govanhill, in the Rutherglen area of the city, where Speirs' grandparents and father lived. Clyde had finished 17th in 1907–08, one point ahead of bottom side Port Glasgow. Speirs played only 14 league games for Clyde but helped them to their highest league position of third, three points behind winners Celtic. Clyde lost to Celtic in the Scottish Cup semi-final, following a replay. It was Speirs' only season with Clyde, during which he scored a total of 10 goals from 20 appearances.

=== Bradford City ===
Speirs left his native Scotland during the summer of 1909, to head for Yorkshire and sign for Bradford City, under the management of his countryman Peter O'Rourke. It would be City's second season in the First Division following their promotion in 1907–08, and O'Rourke wanted to strengthen his side after they narrowly avoided relegation in their first season in the top flight.

He assembled a team which contained several Scottish players, and also brought in England international outside right Dicky Bond. Speirs made his debut on the opening day of the 1909–10 season, as City lost 1–0 to Manchester United. His first goal came three months later, in a 3–1 victory over Sunderland, during the middle of a 10-game undefeated spell. Speirs played in all 38 games during his first season, scoring six times, as City finished seventh. He also played in both the club's FA Cup games that season, scoring in a 4–2 victory over Notts County in the first round.

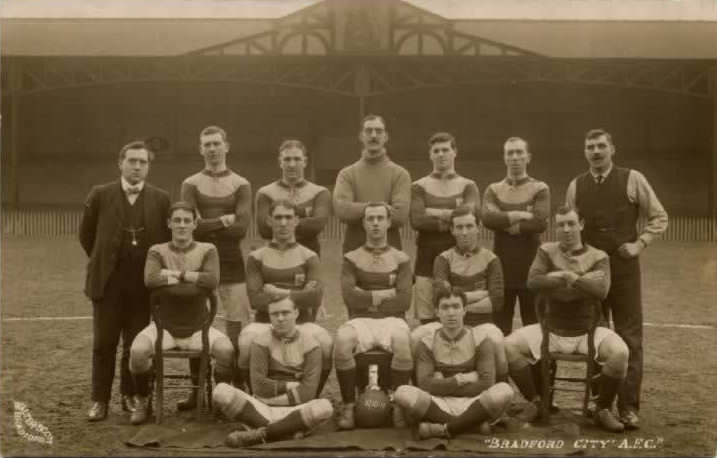
Bradford City's 1911 FA Cup winning team. Speirs is sat in the centre of the middle row.

It was the following season when Speirs wrote his name in the club's record books, with his performance in the same competition. He played 25 league games, scoring seven goals, to help City to fifth place, a position which the club has not yet bettered. The club reached the FA Cup Final in the same season, with Speirs playing in all but one of the games along the way, scoring in a 2–1 second round victory over Norwich City. Speirs, along with Frank Thompson and George Robinson, was censured by the Football Association following a scramble for the match ball at the end of the semi-final victory against Blackburn Rovers.

Speirs was captain of the side and in the days up to the final he wrote to his opposite number, Colin Veitch. The contents of his letter are not known, but in his reply, Veitch said Speirs had "expressed in sound terms the true spirit of comradeship, and the proper sentiments one would expect to see associated with the sportsman, and the sport". Speirs led out a team which contained eight Scots for the final at the Crystal Palace on 22 April 1911 against Newcastle United. The game ended in a 0–0 draw, in what was described as a "decidedly dull and uneventful game".

The final replay was played four days later at Old Trafford, Manchester, with City making one change to the team, bringing in Bob Torrance for fellow Scottish defender Willie Gildea. After 15 minutes, Speirs scored what turned out to be the only goal of the game to win the cup. Robinson shot at goal, but the wind caught the ball, which was headed on by Frank Thompson. Speirs himself headed the ball at goal, and Newcastle's goalkeeper Jimmy Lawrence was distracted by City striker Frank O'Rourke and the ball rolled into the net. Speirs lifted the newly-cast trophy, which had been made by Bradford jewellers Fattorinis, and displayed it on the club's victory parade later that evening in Bradford. The following day, Speirs was pictured on the front page of the Daily Mirror newspaper, holding the cup.

The club's attempt to defend the victory came to an end after six consecutive clean sheets, when they were defeated 3–2 by Barnsley with Speirs scoring one of the goals. However, he was limited to 10 league games, not playing from September until March and finished the season with seven goals. They included his second senior hat-trick during a 5–1 victory over Sheffield Wednesday on 30 March 1912. Speirs started the following season, but after playing 13 of the first 15 games, he left. He had played 96 games in total, scoring 33 goals.

=== Leeds City ===
Speirs joined neighbours Leeds City, which played in the Second Division, for a fee of £1,200 (a then-record for both clubs), in December 1912, becoming one of Herbert Chapman's first signings. Speirs' debut came on 28 December in a 3–2 defeat to Fulham and although his first goal did not come until his fifth game against Bradford (Park Avenue), Speirs finished second highest scorer with 10 goals, behind Billy McLeod. Their goals helped Leeds finish in sixth position, 10 points off the promotion places. The following season, Leeds came closer to promotion, but despite Speirs, as captain, scoring 12 goals and McLeod netting 27, they came fourth, two points behind Park Avenue in the second promotion spot. Despite the outbreak of the First World War in June 1914, league football continued, but Leeds lost their first four games of the season and were unable to recover, finishing a lowly 15th. Speirs scored the only goal of the West Riding Cup final against Hull City on 11 November 1914 to give what was Leeds City's only ever trophy before the club was expelled from the league in 1919 and subsequently dissolved. League football was suspended at the end of the season and the last game of Speirs' career was a 2–0 defeat to Barnsley on 24 April 1915. He played 73 league games for Leeds, scoring 32 goals.

In total, Speirs had played 226 league games, a further 30 Scottish and English FA Cup games, and several other appearances in other cup competitions. During his career, he scored 92 league goals, and 12 senior cup goals.

== First World War ==
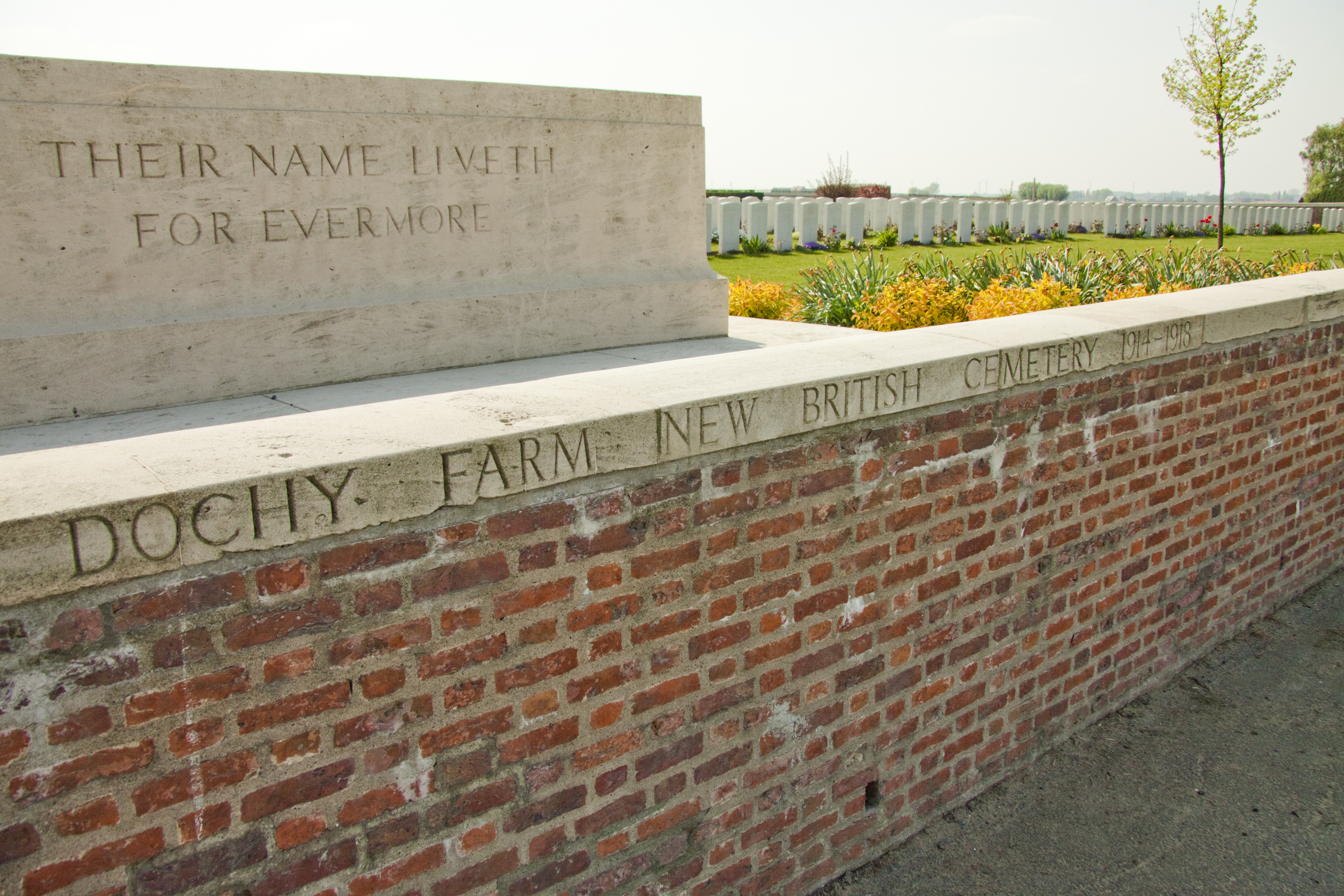
Dochy Farm New British Cemetery stone of remembrance

At the end of the 1914–15 season, Speirs returned to his native Glasgow and enlisted in the Queen's Own Cameron Highlanders on 17 May 1915. Conscription was a year away, from which Speirs would have been exempt because he was married with two young children. Private S/18170 Speirs was posted to the regiment's headquarters in Inverness where he joined the 3rd Battalion, a reserve battalion, for training. He was promoted Lance Corporal while on training and after the British troops suffered heavy casualties, Speirs was posted overseas on 29 May 1916. The following month, he was promoted to the rank of Corporal. Later the same year, he sustained a wounded elbow, from either a gunshot or shrapnel injury.

In April 1917, Speirs took part in the Second Battle of Arras, for which he was awarded the Military Medal for bravery in May 1917, before he was promoted to Sergeant in June. The following month, he returned home to Scotland on leave, but he soon returned to France and was killed during the Battle of Passchendaele on or about 20 August 1917, aged 31. He was shot in the thigh during an advance and crawled into a shellhole. He was attended to, but was abandoned by his regiment and was not seen alive again. He is buried at Dochy Farm New British Cemetery, near Ypres in Belgium.

== Personal life and legacy ==
Speirs married Elizabeth Lennox Maben on 24 October 1906 in Glasgow. On 11 December 1907, the couple's first child, James Hamilton Speirs, was born. Speirs, who had still been recorded as a clerk at the time of the wedding, was now listed as a spirit dealer's stocktaker. Their second child, Elizabeth Maben Speirs, known as Betty, was born on 6 August 1912.

Speirs was also a freemason. He was initiated into Lodge Saint Vincent Sandyford No 553, based in Glasgow, on 11 March 1908, just four days after he had made his only Scottish appearance. When his football career took him away from Glasgow, Speirs maintained links with the lodge. He became a Master Mason, then a life member on 12 February 1913.

Following Speirs' death, Bessie remarried during the 1920s and moved to the south of England with Betty and her new husband. His son remained in Scotland but later emigrated to Canada. In 2003, his family auctioned Speirs' 1911 FA Cup winning medal with his Military Medal and service medal. The FA Cup medal was sold for £26,210, a record for a cup medal.

Bradford City fan Mark Lawn bought Speirs' FA Cup winning medal. Lawn later became chairman of the football club and allowed the medal to be shown, alongside that of Frank Thompson, in the club's museum. Speirs' medals formed part of an exhibition to celebrate Bradford City's centenary in 2003 at Bradford Industrial Museum and have also been on show at Imperial War Museum North, in Greater Manchester, as part of an exhibition linking sport and war.

== Playing honours ==
Maryhill

- Glasgow Junior Cup: 1904–05

Rangers

- Glasgow Merchants Charity Cup: 1905–06

Bradford City

- FA Cup: 1910–11

Leeds City

- West Riding Cup: 1913–14

== Career statistics ==
Senior competitions only.

Appearances and goals by club, season and competition
Club	Season	League			National Cup		Total	
Club	Season	Division	Apps	Goals	Apps	Goals	Apps	Goals
Rangers	1905–06	Scottish League First Division	18	6	3	3	21	9
Rangers	1906–07	Scottish League First Division	22	13	3	1	25	14
Rangers	1907–08	Scottish League First Division	13	5	3	1	16	6
Rangers	Total		53	24	9	5	62	29
Clyde	1908–09	Scottish League First Division	14	7	6	3	20	10
Bradford City	1909–10	First Division	38	6	2	1	40	7
Bradford City	1910–11	First Division	25	7	6	2	31	9
Bradford City	1911–12	First Division	10	7	2	1	12	8
Bradford City	1912–13	First Division	13	9	0	0	13	9
Bradford City	Total		86	29	10	4	96	33
Leeds City	1912–13	Second Division	19	10	1	0	20	10
Leeds City	1913–14	Second Division	29	12	2	0	31	12
Leeds City	1914–15	Second Division	25	10	2	0	27	10
Leeds City	Total		73	32	5	0	78	32
Career total			226	92	30	12	256	104
