= Gildea =

Gildea is a surname.

Although spelled "Gildea", the name is pronounced "gill-day", rhyming with the Irish surname "O'Shea".

Notable people with the surname include:

- Damien Gildea (born 1969), Australian mountaineer and Antarctic explorer, for whom the Gildea Glacier
- Harry Gildea (1890–1917), Scottish footballer
- James Gildea (1838–1920), British Army officer and philanthropist
- James H. Gildea (1890–1988), American newspaperman and Democratic member of the US House of Representatives
- John Gildea, Irish Gaelic footballer
- Johnny Gildea (1910–79), American football player
- Lorie Skjerven Gildea, (born 1961), attorney and former Chief Justice of the Minnesota Supreme Court
- Peter Gildea (1883–1940), Scottish footballer
- Robert Gildea (born 1952), professor of Modern History at Oxford University
- Tom Gildea (born 1939), Irish independent politician
- Willie Gildea (born 1888), Scottish footballer

== See also ==
- Gilday
- Kildee
