= 1909–10 British Home Championship =

Tournament details
- Host country: England, Ireland, Scotland and Wales
- Dates: 12 February – 11 April 1910
- Teams: 4

Final positions
- Champions: Scotland (15th title)
- Runners-up: England

Tournament statistics
- Matches played: 6
- Goals scored: 12 (2 per match)
- Top scorer(s): (Wales) Grenville Morris (Wales) Robert Evans (2 goals)

The 1909–10 British Home Championship was an annual football competition played between the British Home Nations during the second half of the 1909/10 season. It was won by Scotland after a very close three-way competition between the Scots, England and Ireland which Scotland only won by a single point, Ireland and England coming joint second with Wales trailing, again by a single point.

England and Ireland were well matched throughout the contest, drawing in their opening match, a result which gave Scotland the advantage after they narrowly beat Wales in Kilmarnock during their opening game. Their challenge faltered in the second game as Ireland beat them by the same scoreline in Belfast. England too achieved a 1–0 win, over Wales in Cardiff. This put England and Ireland at the head of the table, but they were soon surpassed by the Scots, who defeated England 2–0 in Glasgow. Ireland's bid for the title was forestalled by Wales in the final match of the competition, who won 4–1 to score their only points of the competition in a powerful performance.

== Table ==
Team	Pld	W	D	L	GF	GA	GD	Pts
Scotland (C)	3	2	0	1	3	1	+2	4
England	3	1	1	1	2	3	−1	3
Ireland	3	1	1	1	3	5	−2	3
Wales	3	1	0	2	4	3	+1	2

Rules for classification: 1) points. The points system worked as follows: 2 points for a win and 1 point for a draw.
(C) Champions

== Results ==
12 February 1910

Ireland	1–1	England
Thompson 43'		Fleming 51'

Solitude, Belfast
Attendance: 8,000
Referee: Alex Jackson (Scotland)

5 March 1910

Scotland	1–0	Wales
Devine 86'

Rugby Park, Kilmarnock
Attendance: 22,000
Referee: Herbert S. Bamlett (England)

14 March 1910

Wales	0–1	England
		Ducat 66'

Cardiff Arms Park, Cardiff
Attendance: 20,000
Referee: James Stark (Scotland)

19 March 1910

Ireland	1–0	Scotland
Thompson 54'

Windsor Park, Belfast
Attendance: 17,000
Referee: Jack Howcroft (England)

2 April 1910

Scotland	2–0	England
McMenemy 20'; Quinn 32'

Hampden Park, Glasgow
Attendance: 106,205
Referee: James Mason (England)

11 April 1910

Wales	4–1	Ireland
Morris 45', 72'; Evans 24', 30'		Darling 47' (pen.)

Racecourse Ground, Wrexham
Attendance: 8,000
Referee: James Mason (England)

== Winning squad ==
- Scotland

Name	Apps/Goals by opponent			Total	
Name	(Wales) WAL	(Ireland) IRE	(England) ENG	Apps	Goals
Jimmy Quinn	1	1	1/1	3	1
Jimmy Brownlie	1	1	1	3	0
Jimmy Hay	1	1	1	3	0
George Law	1	1	1	3	0
Jimmy McMenemy	1		1/1	2	1
Alec Bennett	1		1	2	0
Sandy Higgins		1	1	2	0
Bobby Templeton		1	1	2	0
Willie Loney	1	1		2	0
James Mitchell	1	1		2	0
Archie Devine	1/1			1	1
Andy Aitken			1	1	0
Peter McWilliam			1	1	0
Charlie Thomson			1	1	0
Alec McNair	1			1	0
George Robertson	1			1	0
John McTavish		1		1	0
George Sinclair		1		1	0
Willie Walker		1		1	0
