= 1911 FA Cup final =

- Event: 1910–11 FA Cup
Bradford City	Newcastle United
- Bradford City won after a replay

Final
Bradford City	Newcastle United
0	0
- Date: 22 April 1911
- Venue: Crystal Palace, London
- Referee: John Pearson
- Attendance: 69,068

Replay
Bradford City	Newcastle United
1	0
- Date: 26 April 1911
- Venue: Old Trafford, Manchester
- Referee: John Pearson
- Attendance: 66,646

The 1911 FA Cup final was the 40th FA Cup final. It was contested by Bradford City and Newcastle United. The first game resulted in a goalless draw at Crystal Palace. A single goal scored by Jimmy Speirs for Bradford won the replay at Old Trafford.

== Route to the final ==
=== Bradford City ===
Home teams listed first. Round 1: New Brompton 0–1 Bradford City

Round 2: Bradford City 2–1 Norwich City

Round 3: Bradford City 1–0 Grimsby Town

Round 4: Bradford City 1–0 Burnley

Semi-final: Bradford City 3–0 Blackburn Rovers (at Bramall Lane, Sheffield)

=== Newcastle United ===
Home teams listed first. Round 1: Newcastle United 6–1 Bury

Round 2: Newcastle United 1–1 Northampton Town

Round 2 replay: Northampton Town 0–1 Newcastle United

Round 3: Newcastle United 3–2 Hull City

Round 4: Newcastle United 4–0 Derby County

Semi-final: Newcastle United 3–0 Chelsea (at St Andrew's, Birmingham)

== Match summary ==
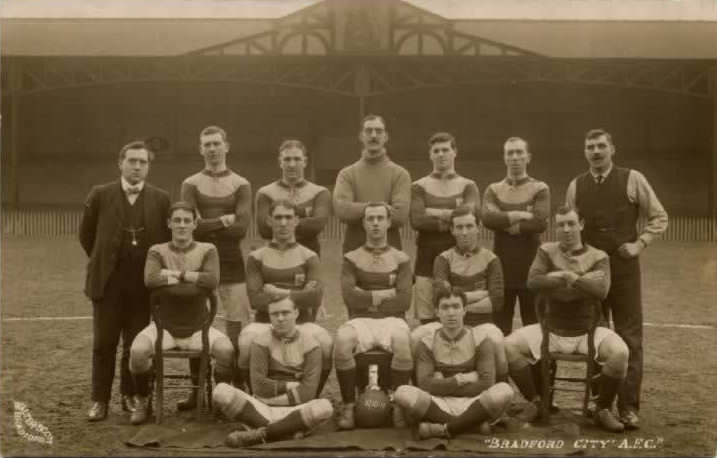
The winning Bradford City team

Newcastle were defending the cup they had won the year before by defeating Barnsley 2–0. They faced a Bradford City side who had earned their highest position in the league. Newcastle's preparations were upset by long-term injuries to England international centre-forward Albert Shepherd and Peter McWilliam. Bradford's team showed just one surprise with Scottish centre-half Willie Gildea drafted in for just his 10th game for the club.

The first match at Crystal Palace ended goalless after 90 minutes, meaning for the second successive year the final went to a replay. City made one change to their team for the replay with Bob Torrance coming in for Gildea, who never played for City again. Newcastle's team remained unchanged. The replay, which took place at Old Trafford, was settled by a single goal for Bradford due to a mistake by Newcastle's goalkeeper (Lawrence), a header scored by captain Jimmy Speirs.

It was a new trophy that Speirs lifted, appropriately made by Bradford jewellers Fattorini's. The cup triumph remains Bradford's only major honour.

== Match details ==
22 April 1911

Bradford City	0–0	Newcastle United

Crystal Palace
Attendance: 69,068
Referee: John Pearson

Bradford City	Newcastle United

GK	Mark Mellors
	Robert Campbell
	David Taylor
	George Robinson
CH	Willie Gildea
	Jimmy McDonald
OR	Peter Logan
	Jimmy Speirs (c)
	Frank O'Rourke
	Archie Devine
	Frank Thompson
Manager:
Peter O'Rourke

GK	Jimmy Lawrence
Billy McCracken
Tony Whitson
Colin Veitch (c)
Wilf Low
David Willis
Jock Rutherford
George Jobey
Jimmy Stewart
Sandy Higgins
George Wilson
Manager:
The Directors Committee

Match rules

- 90 minutes.
- Replay if scores still level.
- No substitutions.

=== Replay ===
26 April 1911

Bradford City	1–0	Newcastle United
Speirs 15'

Old Trafford
Attendance: 66,646
Referee: John Pearson

Bradford City	Newcastle United

GK	Mark Mellors
	Robert Campbell
	David Taylor
	George Robinson
CH	Bob Torrance
	Jimmy McDonald
OR	Peter Logan
	Jimmy Speirs (c)
	Frank O'Rourke
	Archie Devine
	Frank Thompson
Manager:
Peter O'Rourke

GK	Jimmy Lawrence
Billy McCracken
Tony Whitson
Colin Veitch (c)
Wilf Low
David Willis
Jock Rutherford
George Jobey
Jimmy Stewart
Sandy Higgins
George Wilson
Manager:
The Directors Committee

Match rules

- 90 minutes.
- 30 minutes of extra-time if necessary.
- No substitutions.
