= 1913–14 Dumbarton F.C. season =

Dumbarton
1913–1914 season
- Stadium: Boghead Park, Dumbarton
- Scottish League Division One: 19th
- Scottish Cup: Second Round
- Top goalscorer: League: John Rowan (12); All: John Rowan (17)
- Highest home attendance: 13,000
- Lowest home attendance: 2,000
- Average home league attendance: 5,631
Home colours

The 1913–14 season was the 37th Scottish football season in which Dumbarton competed at national level, entering the Scottish Football League, the Scottish Cup and the Scottish Qualifying Cup. In addition Dumbarton played in the Dumbartonshire Cup.

== Scottish First Division ==
Dumbarton's return to 'top flight' league football for the first time since 1896 witnessed a good start which saw the club unbeaten in their first six league outings. This fine form could not be maintained however and Dumbarton eventually finished 19th out of 20 with 27 points.

16 August 1913 Scottish Division 1	Dumbarton	4–0	Queen's Park	Boghead Park
	Rowan 25', 26', 70'; McDade			Attendance: 7,000; Referee: A McGregor

23 August 1913 Scottish Division 1	Dumbarton	1–1	Kilmarnock	Boghead Park
	Ferguson 25'		Culley 10'	Attendance: 13,000; Referee: J Lyons

30 August 1913 Scottish Division 1	St Mirren	1–1	Dumbarton	Love Street (stadium)
	Magner		Speedie 85'	Attendance: 6,000; Referee: T Robertson

1 September 1913 Scottish Division 1	Dumbarton	2–1	Ayr United	Boghead Park
	Murray, J 85'		Robertson	Attendance: 4,000; Referee: Sgt Major Vick

17 September 1913 Scottish Division 1	Ayr United	1–2	Dumbarton	Somerset Park
	Gray 70'		Blyth; Murray, J	Attendance: 4,000

27 September 1913 Scottish Division 1	Dumbarton	1–1	Motherwell	Boghead Park
	Blyth 10'		Findlayson 25'	Attendance: 5,000; Referee: R Kelso

11 October 1913 Scottish Division 1	Dumbarton	0–3	Hibernian	Boghead Park
			Williamson 12'; Fleming 30'; Hendren 47'	Attendance: 7,000; Referee: H Humphries

18 October 1913 Scottish Division 1	Airdrie	4–1	Dumbarton	Broomfield Park
	Donaldson; Reid; Murphy		Murray 88' (o.g.)	Attendance: 7,000; Referee: J Rorrison

25 October 1913 Scottish Division 1	Dumbarton	1–0	Partick Thistle	Boghead Park
	Rowan 47'			Attendance: 7,000; Referee: A Edward

1 November 1913 Scottish Division 1	Third Lanark	1–0	Dumbarton	Cathkin Park
	Rankin 84'			Attendance: 8,000; Referee: H Humphries

8 November 1913 Scottish Division 1	Rangers	3–2	Dumbarton	Ibrox Park
	Parker 38'; Bowie 49'; Gordon 89' (pen.)		McConnell 3', 40'	Attendance: 12,000; Referee: A McGregor

15 November 1913 Scottish Division 1	Dumbarton	0–4	Celtic	Boghead Park
			Gallagher 20', 85'; Whitehead 75'; Browning	Attendance: 10,000; Referee: J Binnie

22 November 1913 Scottish Division 1	Falkirk	3–1	Dumbarton	Brockville Park
	Croal; Robertson 52'; McNaught		Speedie 10'	Attendance: 7,000; Referee: J Bell

29 November 1913 Scottish Division 1	Dumbarton	1–1	Hamilton	Boghead Park
	McConnell 25'		Bain 27'	Attendance: 4,000; Referee: Sgt Major Vick

6 December 1913 Scottish Division 1	Dundee	5–1	Dumbarton	Dens Park
	Skene 33'; Montgomery 40'; Steven 48'; Wall		Pender 89'	Attendance: 8,000; Referee: R Murray

13 December 1913 Scottish Division 1	Dumbarton	2–1	St Mirren	Boghead Park
	Speedie 30'; McConnell 35'		Pearson 89'	Attendance: 5,000; Referee: T Dougray

20 December 1913 Scottish Division 1	Aberdeen	2–3	Dumbarton	Pittodrie Stadium
	Main 30'; Soye 90'		Speedie 32' (pen.); Pender; McConnell 88'	Attendance: 6,000; Referee: T Dougray

27 December 1913 Scottish Division 1	Clyde	0–0	Dumbarton	Shawfield Stadium
				Attendance: 4,000; Referee: G Hamilton

1 January 1914 Scottish Division 1	Raith Rovers	1–2	Dumbarton	Starks Park
	Martin 10'		Rowan; Lawrie	Attendance: 8,000; Referee: C Hamilton

3 January 1914 Scottish Division 1	Dumbarton	0–4	Falkirk	Boghead Park
			Lennie 40'; Robertson; McNaught 75'	Attendance: 6,000; Referee: J Matthews

10 January 1914 Scottish Division 1	Celtic	4–0	Dumbarton	Celtic Park
	Owens 75'; Gallagher 76', 82', 88'			Attendance: 11,000; Referee: W Caldwell

17 January 1914 Scottish Division 1	Dumbarton	2–1	Hearts	Boghead Park
	Rowan 7'; Brown 44'		Dawson 5'	Attendance: 7,000; Referee: J Stevenson

24 January 1914 Scottish Division 1	Kilmarnock	6–0	Dumbarton	Rugby Park
	Neil; Whittle			Attendance: 4,000; Referee: A Allan

31 January 1914 Scottish Division 1	Dumbarton	0–1	Aberdeen	Boghead Park
			Soye 85'	Attendance: 3,000; Referee: T Robertson

14 February 1914 Scottish Division 1	Partick Thistle	2–1	Dumbarton	Firhill Park
	McTavish; Marshall		Rowan 45'	Attendance: 15,000; Referee: J Stevenson

21 February 1914 Scottish Division 1	Dumbarton	1–3	Clyde	Boghead Park
	Gildea		Chamlers; Thompson	Attendance: 5,000; Referee: J Muir

28 February 1914 Scottish Division 1	Motherwell	4–3	Dumbarton	Fir Park
	Gray; Hillhouse 48'; Muir 90'		Rowan	Attendance: 5,000; Referee: A Allan

7 March 1914 Scottish Division 1	Dumbarton	2–3	Dundee	Boghead Park
	Ferguson; Thom		Ferguson; Montgomery; Philip	Attendance: 3,000; Referee: R Kelso

14 March 1914 Scottish Division 1	Dumbarton	0–3	Rangers	Boghead Park
			Stewart 30', 45', 88'	Attendance: 8,000; Referee: A Edward

21 March 1914 Scottish Division 1	Morton	3–1	Dumbarton	Cappielow Park
	McLean 25'; Gourlay; Torrance 89' (pen.)		Brown 84'	Attendance: 10,000; Referee: J Stevenson

28 March 1914 Scottish Division 1	Dumbarton	2–6	Morton	Boghead Park
	Murray, J Gildea		Gourlay 1'; Torrance (pen.); Buchanan; Seymour; Stevenson (pen.)	Attendance: 4,000; Referee: R Murray

31 March 1914 Scottish Division 1	Queen's Park	3–0	Dumbarton	Hampden Park
	Garvie 43'; Frew (o.g.); McKenzie			Attendance: 5,000; Referee: G McKenzie

4 April 1914 Scottish Division 1	Hearts	5–1	Dumbarton	Tynecastle Stadium
	Low 44', 48'; Graham 80'		Murray, J	Attendance: 6,500; Referee: J Bell

6 April 1914 Scottish Division 1	Dumbarton	2–2	Raith Rovers	Boghead Park
	Speedie 2'; Gildea 75'		Rattray 39'; Gibson 65'	Attendance: 2,000; Referee: M Humphries

11 April 1914 Scottish Division 1	Hamilton	3–1	Dumbarton	Douglas Park
	Kelly; Anderson; Kyle 90'		Rowan 70'	Attendance: 3,000; Referee: J Matthews

15 April 1914 Scottish Division 1	Hibernian	1–1	Dumbarton	Easter Road Stadium
	Reid 10'		Gildea 20'	Attendance: 5,000; Referee: T Dougray

18 April 1914 Scottish Division 1	Dumbarton	1–0	Airdrie	Boghead Park
	Rowan 60'			Attendance: 5,000; Referee: Sgt Major Vick

23 April 1914 Scottish Division 1	Dumbarton	2–0	Third Lanark	Boghead Park
	Gettins 40'; Murray, J 52'			Attendance: 2,000; Referee: A Jackson

=== Promotion/Relegation ===
At the end of the season, only Cowdenbeath from the Second Division applied for admission to the 'top fight' but it was the bottom two in the First Division - Dumbarton and St Mirren - who retained their places in the end of season election. For the third time a vote was held to allow for automatic promotion/relegation but while the 11-7 vote was in agreement it failed to obtain the two-thirds majority required.

== Scottish Cup ==
The Scottish Cup campaign was short-lived as Dumbarton lost out to Third Lanark in the second round.

7 February 1914 Cup R2	Third Lanark	2–0	Dumbarton	Cathkin Park
	Milne 10'; MvFie			Attendance: 11,000; Referee: G Hamilton

== Scottish Qualifying Cup ==
Dumbarton qualified for the Scottish Cup by reaching the fourth round of the Scottish Qualifying Cup before losing to non-league Nithsdale Wanderers.

6 September 1913 Qualifying Cup R1	Vale of Leven	0–0	Dumbarton	Millburn Park
				Attendance: 6,000; Referee: J Kilbride

13 September 1913 Qualifying Cup R1r	Dumbarton	2–0	Vale of Leven	Boghead Park
	Rowan 65'; Speedie 70' (pen.)			Attendance: 6,000; Referee: J Kilbride

20 September 1913 Qualifying Cup R2	Dumbarton	4–0	Johnstone	Boghead Park
	Rowan 3', 75'; Blyth 8'; Speedie 30'			Attendance: 4,000; Referee: A Edwards

4 October 1913 Qualifying Cup R3	Dumbarton	5–1	Hurlford	Boghead Park
	Riddell; Rowan; McConnell		Paton	Attendance: 4,000

18 October 1913 Qualifying Cup R4	Nithsdale Wanderers	3–1	Dumbarton	Castleholm Park
	Watson 42'; Harrison		Murray.J

== Dumbartonshire Cup ==
After an absence of three seasons, Dumbarton entered the Dumbartonshire Cup but as in their previous six attempts were defeated in the final, this time by Renton.

31 December 1913 County Cup SF1	Dumbarton	1–3	Dumbarton Harp	Boghead Park
	McDade		Goal

25 April 1914 County Cup SF2	Dumbarton Harp	0–4 (3–5 agg.)	Dumbarton	Meadow Park, Dumbarton
			Rowan	Attendance: 3,000

29 April 1914 County Cup Final	Renton	0–0	Dumbarton	Millburn Park
				Attendance: 4,000

30 April 1914 County Cup Final Replay	Renton	1–0	Dumbarton	Millburn Park
	Kain 1'			Attendance: 3,000

== Other Match ==
There was a benefit match played for long serving player Robert Muirhead, against Third Lanark.

5 January 1914 Benefit	Dumbarton	1–4	Third Lanark	Boghead Park
	McDermid		Goal

== Player statistics ==
No.	Pos	Nat	Player	Total		First Division		Scottish Cup		Qualifying Cup	
No.	Pos	Nat	Player	Apps	Goals	Apps	Goals	Apps	Goals	Apps	Goals
	GK	(Scotland) SCO	Robert Bryson	15	0	14	0	1	0	0	0
	GK	(Scotland) SCO	Alex Forsyth	1	0	0	0	0	0	1	0
	GK	(Scotland) SCO	Archibald Frew	11	0	11	0	0	0	0	0
	GK	(Scotland) SCO	John B Miller	17	0	13	0	0	0	4	0
	DF	(Scotland) SCO	Andrew Clarkson	9	0	8	0	0	0	1	0
	DF	(Scotland) SCO	John Davie	1	0	1	0	0	0	0	0
	DF	(Scotland) SCO	Charles Keir	22	0	18	0	0	0	4	0
	DF	(Scotland) SCO	William McAlpine	25	0	24	0	1	0	0	0
	DF	(Scotland) SCO	Raeburn McLay	1	0	1	0	0	0	0	0
	DF	(Scotland) SCO	David Slimmon	2	0	1	0	0	0	1	0
	DF	(Scotland) SCO	James Thomson	27	0	22	0	1	0	4	0
	MF	(Scotland) SCO	Jack Brown	2	0	1	0	0	0	1	0
	MF	(Scotland) SCO	James Chalk	1	0	0	0	0	0	1	0
	MF	(Scotland) SCO	Harry Gildea	27	4	27	4	0	0	0	0
	MF	(Scotland) SCO	Peter McFie	36	0	31	0	1	0	4	0
	MF	(Scotland) SCO	Andrew Potter	5	0	3	0	0	0	2	0
	MF	(Scotland) SCO	James Riddell	32	2	28	0	0	0	4	2
	MF	(Scotland) SCO	Daniel Steel	5	0	5	0	0	0	0	0
	FW	(Scotland) SCO	Jim Blyth	20	3	15	2	1	0	4	1
	FW	(Scotland) SCO	John Brown	10	2	9	2	1	0	0	0
	FW	(Scotland) SCO	James Ferguson	40	2	34	2	1	0	5	0
	FW	(England) ENG	Alfred Gettins	5	1	5	1	0	0	0	0
	FW	(Scotland) SCO	Samuel Hendry	1	0	0	0	0	0	1	0
	FW	(Scotland) SCO	Thomas Lawrie	3	1	3	1	0	0	0	0
	FW	(Scotland) SCO	Thomas McConnell	28	6	23	5	1	0	4	1
	FW	(Scotland) SCO	James McDade	9	1	8	1	0	0	1	0
	FW	(Scotland) SCO	Alex McGillivray	1	0	0	0	0	0	1	0
	FW	(Scotland) SCO	John Murray	11	7	9	6	0	0	2	1
	FW	(Scotland) SCO	William Murray	1	0	1	0	0	0	0	0
	FW	(Scotland) SCO	Robert Pender	6	2	6	2	0	0	0	0
	FW	(Scotland) SCO	John Plank	3	0	3	0	0	0	0	0
	FW	(Scotland) SCO	John Robertson	10	0	7	0	0	0	3	0
	FW	(Scotland) SCO	John Rowan	35	17	30	12	1	0	4	5
	FW	(Scotland) SCO	Finlay Speedie	36	7	32	5	1	0	3	2
	FW	(Scotland) SCO	Alexander Thom	24	1	23	1	1	0	0	0
	FW	(Scotland) SCO	Walter Wilson	2	0	2	0	0	0	0	0

=== Transfers ===
==== Players in ====
Player	From	Date
(Scotland) Alexander Clarkson	(Scotland) Ardrossan Winton Rovers	13 May 1913
(Scotland) Thomas McConnell	(Scotland) Ardrossan Winton Rovers	24 Jun 1913
(Scotland) Raeburn McLay	(Scotland) Albion Rovers (trialist)	27 Jun 1913
(Scotland) John Murray	(Scotland) Renton	14 Jul 1913
(Scotland) James McDade	(Scotland) Port Glasgow	15 Jul 1913
(Scotland) Peter McFie	(Scotland) Airdrie	13 Aug 1913
(Scotland) James Riddell	(Scotland) Rangers	14 Aug 1913
(Scotland) James Thomson	(Scotland) Third Lanark	29 Aug 1913
(Scotland) John Robertson	(Scotland) Clyde	10 Sep 1913
(Scotland) John Davie	(Scotland) Hamilton (trilaist)	24 Sep 1913
(Scotland) William McAlpine	(Scotland) Benburb	12 Oct 1913
(Scotland) David Slimmon	(Scotland) Auchinleck Talbot	20 Oct 1913
(Scotland) Harry Gildea	(Scotland) Lochgelly United	12 Nov 1913
(Scotland) Robert Bryson	(Scotland) Yoker Athletic	24 Nov 1913
(Scotland) Alexander Thom	(Scotland) Yoker Athletic	10 Dec 1913
(Scotland) Thomas Lawrie	(Wales) Pontypridd	17 Dec 1913
(Scotland) James Brown	(Scotland) Yoker Athletic	16 Jan 1914
(Scotland) John Plank	(England) Derby County	18 Feb 1914
(Scotland) Archibald Frew	(Scotland) Ashfield	2 Mar 1914
(Scotland) Daniel Steele	(Scotland) Third Lanark (loan)	4 Apr 1914
(England) Alfred Gettins	(Scotland) Partick Thistle	4 Apr 1914

==== Players out ====
Player	To	Date
(Scotland) William Brown	(Scotland) Albion Rovers	9 Aug 1913
(Scotland) George Bennett	(Scotland) Arthurlie	30 Aug 1913
(Scotland) Andy Robertson	(Scotland) Johnstone	15 Oct 1913
(Scotland) Johnny Hill	(Scotland) Celtic	24 Oct 1913
(Scotland) Robert Pender	(Scotland) St Mirren	5 Feb 1914
(Scotland) William Duncan	(Scotland) Dundee Hibs	12 Feb 1914
(Scotland) Willie Lithgow	(Scotland) Vale of Leven	

In addition Samuel Hendry and Alex McGillivray all played their final 'first XI' games in Dumbarton colours.

== Reserve Team ==
Dumbarton lost in the second round of the Scottish Second XI Cup to Kilmarnock.
