= Andrew Devine =

Andrew Devine may refer to:

- Andrew Devine (died 2021), 97th victim of the Hillsborough disaster
- Archie Devine (1886–1964), Scottish footballer sometimes known as Andrew
