= Mellors =

Mellors is a surname. Notable people with the surname include:

- Bob Mellors (born 1950), British gay rights activist
- John Mellors (1947–2021), Australian public servant
- Mark Mellors (1880–1961), English footballer
- Nathaniel Mellors (born 1974), British artist and musician
- Ted Mellors (1907–1946), English international motorcycle road racer
- Coco Mellors (born 1989), English fiction writer

== Fictional characters ==
- Oliver Mellors, a character in the novel Lady Chatterley's Lover

== See also ==
- Maelor
- Meller (disambiguation)
- Mellor (disambiguation)
