= Gilday =

Gilday is a surname. Notable people with the surname include:

- John Gilday (1874–1937), Australian politician
- Leela Gilday, Canadian musician
- Michael Gilday (speed skater) (born 1987), Canadian short track speed skater
- Michael M. Gilday, United States Navy admiral
- Patrick Gilday (1862–1917), American labor leader
- Cindy Kenny-Gilday (born 1954), Sahtu environmentalist and activist for Indigenous rights in Canada

== See also ==
- Gildea
- Kildee
