= Peter Logan =

Peter Logan may refer to:

- Peter Logan (footballer, born 1889) (1889–1944), Scottish footballer from Edinburgh, played for Bradford City
- Peter Logan (footballer, born 1877) (1877–1957), known as Paddy, Scottish footballer from Glasgow, played for Woolwich Arsenal
- Peter Logan, Manitoba Liberal Party candidate in the 1999 Manitoba provincial election
