= Tony Whitson =

South African soccer player

Personal information
- Full name: Thomas Thompson Whitson
- Date of birth: 1885
- Place of birth: Cape Town, Cape Colony
- Date of death: 1945 (aged 59–60)
- Position: Left back

Youth career
- Walker Athletic
- Walker Parish
- 1905–1906: Newcastle United

Senior career*
Years	Team	Apps	(Gls)
1906–1919	Newcastle United	124	(0)
1919–19??	Carlisle United		

International career
1909	Football League	1	(0)
- * Club domestic league appearances and goals

Thomas Thompson "Tony" Whitson (1885–1945) was a South African professional soccer player who played as a left back for Newcastle United between 1905 and 1919. He made 124 appearances in the Football League, and 146 across all competitions, representing them in the FA Cup Final in 1910 and 1911.

== Honours ==
Newcastle United

- First Division champions: 1908–09
- FA Cup winner: 1910
- FA Cup runner-up: 1911
