= James Logan (footballer, born 1885) =

Scottish footballer & manager (1885–1961)

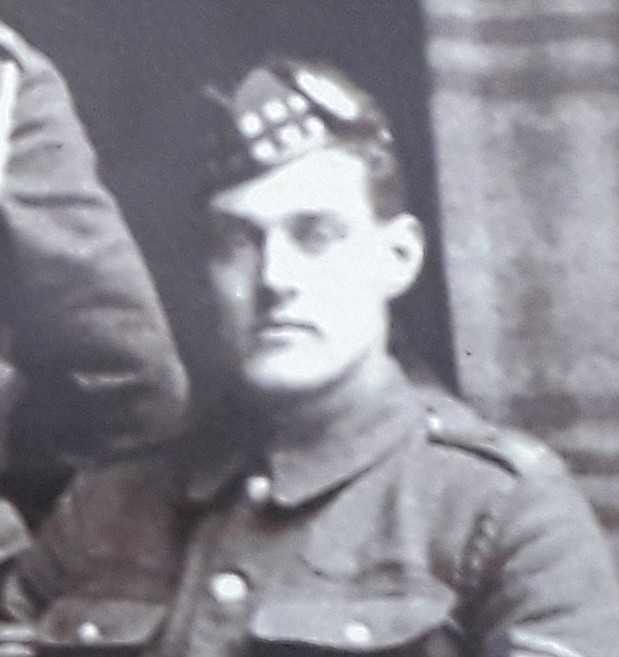
- Logan in military uniform, 1914

Personal information
- Full name: James Henry Logan
- Date of birth: 17 October 1885
- Place of birth: Dunbar, Scotland
- Date of death: 7 June 1961 (aged 75)
- Place of death: Edinburgh, Scotland
- Height: 6 ft 2 in (1.88 m)
- Positions: Centre forward; half back

Senior career*
Years	Team	Apps	(Gls)
- Edinburgh Myrtle
–1905	St Bernard's		
1905–1906	Bradford City	5	(1)
1906–1909	Chesterfield Town	94	(9)
1909–1912	Bradford Park Avenue	59	(3)
1912–1916	Raith Rovers	82	(2)

Managerial career
- 1919–1926: Raith Rovers
- 1930–1933: Raith Rovers
- 1937–1938: Wrexham
- * Club domestic league appearances and goals

James Henry Logan (17 October 1885 – 7 June 1961), sometimes known as Jimmy Logan, was a Scottish professional footballer who made 158 appearances in the English Football League playing for Bradford City, Chesterfield Town and Bradford Park Avenue. He also played for and managed Scottish League club Raith Rovers and was manager of Wrexham of the English Football League. He played primarily as a half back, but appeared at centre forward in his early career.

== Life and career ==
=== Early life and playing career ===
Logan was born in Dunbar, Scotland, in 1885. His younger brother, Peter, also played professional football. As an Edinburgh Myrtle player, Logan was selected at centre forward in two Junior internationals, against Ireland in Belfast in March 1905 and against an English XI at Celtic Park in April. He also appeared for St Bernard's.

In early April 1905, shortly after his international appearance, Logan signed for English Second Division club Bradford City. During his time with Bradford City he made five appearances in the Football League, scoring once. He moved on to another Second Division club, Chesterfield Town, in August 1906, and made his debut at centre forward on the opening day of the 1906–07 season. He continued as a regular in that position, scoring seven goals from sixteen appearances, but was switched to centre half for the last couple of months of the season, and remained in the half-back line, either at centre half or right half, for the remainder of his Chesterfield career. He left the club in 1909 after they failed to be re-elected to the League, and signed for another second-tier club, Bradford Park Avenue.

Logan returned to Scotland in May 1912 to sign for Raith Rovers.

=== First World War ===
In December 1914, Logan and four teammates enlisted in the 16th (Service) Battalion of the Royal Scots, known as McCrae's Battalion. Others were to follow. Logan began his military career as a private, was promoted to sergeant major within six months, and received a commission as lieutenant after a further six. On the first day of the Somme offensive, he was sent home and hospitalised "suffering from severe shell shock, which [had] rendered him completely deaf." He recovered, returned to action, and finished the war with the rank of captain.

=== Managerial career ===
After Raith Rovers' manager Peter Hodge left for Leicester City in 1919, there were sixty applicants for the vacancy. Logan was appointed to the role of secretary-manager, despite the fact that he was still awaiting demobilisation from the Army. According to a retrospective in the Fife Free Press, he "went on to manage one of the greatest teams in the club's history in the early 1920s." After leading Raith to third place in the top division (their highest ever league finish) in the 1921–22 season, he resigned his post when they were relegated at the end of 1925–26.

He was re-appointed as Raith Rovers' manager in December 1930, and resigned in September 1933 after a poor start to the season and a public disagreement between the club's directors and Logan about the extent of his powers and responsibilities.

In 1936, the Courier reported that Logan was to be interviewed for the managerial vacancy at English club Lincoln City. He was not appointed to that post, but did come back into management in January of the following year, with Wrexham of the Third Division North. He resigned at the end of the 1937–38 season over a question of team policy.

=== Personal life ===
Logan opened a confectionery shop when he moved to Kirkcaldy to play for Raith Rovers. The business expanded, and by 1932 he owned what the Dundee Evening Telegraph dubbed "two of the finest candy stores in the district". After his first spell as Raith Rovers' manager came to an end, he bought and ran a hotel, the Airlie Arms at Kirriemuir.

He died in Edinburgh in 1961 at the age of 75.

== Career statistics ==
Appearances and goals by club, season and competition
Club	Season	League			National Cup		Total	
Club	Season	Division	Apps	Goals	Apps	Goals	Apps	Goals
Chesterfield Town	1906–07	Second Division	26	7	2	0	28	7
Chesterfield Town	1907–08	Second Division	33	1	3	1	36	2
Chesterfield Town	1908–09	Second Division	35	1	2	0	37	1
Chesterfield Town	Total		94	9	7	1	101	10
Raith Rovers	1912–13	Scottish First Division	31	1	7	0	38	1
Raith Rovers	1913–14	Scottish First Division	25	1	2	0	27	1
Raith Rovers	1914–15	Scottish First Division	25	0	—		25	0
Raith Rovers	1915–16	Scottish First Division	1	0	—		1	0
Raith Rovers	Total		82	2	9	0	91	1
Career total			176	11	16	1	192	12

== Sources ==
- Frost, Terry (1988). Bradford City A Complete Record 1903-1988. Breedon Books Sport. ISBN 0-907969-38-0.
