= 1906–07 Rangers F.C. season =

Rangers
1906–07 season
- Chairman: James Henderson
- Manager: William Wilton
- Ground: Ibrox Park
- Scottish League Division One: 3rd P34 W19 D7 L8 F69 A33 Pts45
- Scottish Cup: Quarter-finals
- Top goalscorer: League: Jimmy Speirs (13); All: Jimmy Speirs (14)

The 1906–07 season was the 33rd season of competitive football by Rangers.

== Overview ==
Rangers played a total of 37 competitive matches during the 1906–07 season. The side finished third in the league, ten points behind champions Celtic, after winning 19 of the 34 matches.

The Scottish Cup campaign was ended at the hands of the league champions after a 3–0 home defeat. Rangers had beaten Falkirk and Galston en route to the quarter-finals.

== Results ==
All results are written with Rangers' score first.

=== Scottish League Division One ===
| Date | Opponent | Venue | Result | Attendance | Scorers |
|---|---|---|---|---|---|
| 18 August 1906 | Falkirk | H | 2–2 | 13,000 | Smith, Spiers |
| 25 August 1906 | Port Glasgow | A | 2–0 | 8,000 | Mainds, Kyle |
| 1 September 1906 | Aberdeen | H | 6–2 | 10,000 | Stark (2), Kyle, Smith, Rankine, Spiers |
| 22 September 1906 | Dundee | A | 0–2 | 14,600 | |
| 24 September 1906 | Heart of Midlothian | H | 1–1 | 10,000 | McFie |
| 29 September 1906 | Partick Thistle | H | 1–2 | 12,000 | Hamilton |
| 13 October 1906 | Kilmarnock | A | 5–1 | 7,000 | Spiers (2), Smith, Kyle, Rankine |
| 20 October 1906 | Greenock Morton | H | 2–0 | 9,000 | Kivlichan, Spiers |
| 27 October 1906 | Celtic | A | 1–2 | 30,000 | Kyle |
| 3 November 1906 | St Mirren | H | 1–1 | 12,000 | Kyle (pen) |
| 10 November 1906 | Third Lanark | A | 2–0 | 16,000 | Kyle (pen), Law |
| 17 November 1906 | Queen's Park | H | 3–2 | 14,000 | Dickie, Kyle, Cunningham |
| 24 November 1906 | Hibernian | A | 3–1 | | Kyle, McFie, Smith |
| 1 December 1906 | Airdrieonians | H | 2–1 | 13,000 | Spiers, Kyle |
| 8 December 1906 | Clyde | A | 5–1 | | Spiers, Kyle, A.Smith (2), Dickie |
| 15 December 1906 | Motherwell | H | 0–1 | 5,000 | |
| 22 December 1906 | Aberdeen | A | 3–0 | 7,000 | Kyle (2), A.Smith |
| 29 December 1906 | Hamilton Academical | H | 0–1 | 5,000 | |
| 1 January 1907 | Celtic | H | 2–1 | 50,000 | Dickie, Kivlichan |
| 2 January 1907 | Partick Thistle | A | 2–2 | 7,000 | Campbell (2) |
| 5 January 1907 | Greenock Morton | A | 1–2 | 5,000 | Spiers |
| 12 January 1907 | Hibernian | H | 1–0 | 7,000 | Spiers |
| 19 January 1907 | Airdrieonians | A | 3–2 | 8,000 | Cunningham, Spiers, Campbell (pen) |
| 2 February 1907 | Third Lanark | H | 0–0 | 10,000 | |
| 9 February 1907 | Hamilton Academical | A | 3–0 | 6,000 | Spiers, Cunningham, Campbell |
| 23 February 1907 | St Mirren | A | 0–0 | 7,000 | |
| 2 March 1907 | Motherwell | A | 0–1 | 5,000 | |
| 16 March 1907 | Falkirk | A | 1–2 | 7,000 | Kivlichan |
| 23 March 1907 | Clyde | H | 4–0 | 7,000 | Campbell (3), Stark |
| 30 March 1907 | Port Glasgow | H | 5–0 | 5,000 | Campbell (3), Kyle, Livingstone |
| 1 April 1907 | Dundee | H | 2–2 | 12,000 | Campbell (2, 1 pen) |
| 6 April 1907 | Queen's Park | A | 2–1 | 18,000 | Livingstone, Campbell |
| 13 April 1907 | Heart of Midlothian | A | 1–0 | 9,000 | A.Smith |
| 20 April 1907 | Kilmarnock | H | 3–0 | 2,500 | Livingstone (2), Spiers |

=== Scottish Cup ===
| Date | Round | Opponent | Venue | Result | Attendance | Scorers |
|---|---|---|---|---|---|---|
| 26 January 1907 | R1 | Falkirk | A | 2–1 | 16,000 | Campbell (pen), McFie |
| 16 February 1907 | R2 | Galston | A | 4–0 | 4,000 | Livingstone (2), Dickie, Spiers |
| 9 March 1907 | QF | Celtic | H | 0–3 | 60,000 | |

== Appearances ==
| Player | Position | Appearances | Goals |
|---|---|---|---|
| (Scotland) Alex Newbigging | GK | 37 | 0 |
| (Scotland) Robert Campbell | DF | 29 | 13 |
| (Scotland) James Jackson | DF | 16 | 0 |
| (Scotland) Colin Mainds | MF | 13 | 1 |
| (Scotland) Josiah Gray | DF | 23 | 0 |
| (Scotland) John May | DF | 19 | 0 |
| (Scotland) Johnny Rankine | MF | 7 | 2 |
| (Scotland) Finlay Speedie | FW | 1 | 0 |
| (Scotland) Jimmy Speirs | FW | 25 | 14 |
| (Scotland) Archie Kyle | FW | 28 | 13 |
| (Scotland) Alex Smith | FW | 28 | 8 |
| (Scotland) James Galt | MF | 22 | 0 |
| (Scotland) John McFie | FW | 14 | 3 |
| (Scotland) James Stark | DF | 25 | 3 |
| (Scotland) Willie Kivlichan | MF | 11 | 3 |
| (Scotland) Robert Smyth McColl | FW | 1 | 0 |
| (Scotland) David Taylor | DF | 9 | 0 |
| (Scotland) Billy Henry | DF | 22 | 0 |
| (Scotland) James R. Hamilton | FW | 2 | 1 |
| (Scotland) Thomas Ruddiman | MF | 3 | 0 |
| (Ireland) Alex Craig | DF | 12 | 0 |
| (Scotland) Albert Cunningham | MF | 10 | 3 |
| (Scotland) James Menzies | MF | 1 | 0 |
| (Scotland) John Dickie | MF | 23 | 4 |
| (Scotland) George Law | DF | 6 | 1 |
| (Scotland) John Macdonald | MF | 5 | 0 |
| (Scotland) George Livingstone | MF | 13 | 6 |
| (Scotland) William McFarlane | MF | 1 | 0 |
| (Scotland) Jimmy Gordon | DF | 1 | 0 |

== See also ==
- 1906–07 in Scottish football
- 1906–07 Scottish Cup
