= David Slimmon =

Scottish footballer

Personal information
- Full name: David Glencross Slimmon
- Date of birth: 2 August 1895
- Place of birth: Kilmarnock, Scotland
- Date of death: 23 July 1917 (aged 21)
- Place of death: Ypres salient, Belgium
- Position: Left back

Senior career*
| Years | Team | Apps | (Gls) |
- Kilmarnock Hazelbank
| –1912 | St Andrews United | | |
| 1912–1913 | Auchinleck Talbot | | |
| 1913–1914 | Dumbarton | 1 | (0) |
| 1914–1916 | Kilmarnock | 1 | (0) |
- * Club domestic league appearances and goals

David Glencross Slimmon MM (2 August 1895 – 23 July 1917) was a Scottish footballer who played in the Scottish League for Dumbarton and Kilmarnock as a left back.

== Personal life ==
Slimmon served as a second corporal in the Royal Engineers during the First World War. He was awarded the Military Medal in 1916 for "gallantry and bravery in blowing up six German dugouts". Slimmon was killed by shellfire in the Ypres Salient on 23 July 1917 and was buried in Hop Store Cemetery, Vlamertinge.

== Career statistics ==
Appearances and goals by club, season and competition
| Club | Season | League | | | Scottish Cup | | Other | | Total | |
| Club | Season | Division | Apps | Goals | Apps | Goals | Apps | Goals | Apps | Goals |
|---|---|---|---|---|---|---|---|---|---|---|
| Dumbarton | 1913–14 | Scottish First Division | 1 | 0 | 0 | 0 | 1 (Note: Appearance in Scottish Qualifying Cup) | 0 | 2 | 0 |
| Kilmarnock | 1914–15 | Scottish First Division | 16 | 0 | — | | — | | 16 | 0 |
| Kilmarnock | 1915–16 | Scottish First Division | 1 | 0 | — | | — | | 1 | 0 |
| Kilmarnock | Total | | 17 | 0 | — | | — | | 17 | 0 |
| Career total | | | 18 | 0 | 0 | 0 | 1 | 0 | 19 | 0 |
