= 1910–11 FA Cup =

Tournament details
- Country: England

Final positions
- Champions: Bradford City (1st title)
- Runners-up: Newcastle United

The 1910–11 FA Cup was the 40th season of the world's oldest association football competition, the Football Association Challenge Cup (more usually known as the FA Cup). Bradford City won the competition for the first and (as of 2025) only time, beating holders Newcastle United 1–0 in the replay of the final at Old Trafford in Manchester, through a goal from Jimmy Speirs. The first match, held at Crystal Palace, London, was a 0–0 draw.

This season's tournament was the first in which more than 400 clubs (404) entered the competition, although ten teams (including Chorley, Tranmere Rovers and Wimbledon) withdrew without playing a match.

Matches were scheduled to be played at the stadium of the team named first on the date specified for each round, which was always a Saturday. If scores were level after 90 minutes had been played, a replay would take place at the stadium of the second-named team later the same week. If the replayed match was drawn further replays would be held at neutral venues until a winner was determined. If scores were level after 90 minutes had been played in a replay, a 30-minute period of extra time would be played.

1911 was the first year that the current trophy design was used. The FA commissioned Fattorini's of Bradford to design and manufacture a new, larger trophy. Coincidentally, it was won by Bradford City in its first outing. This trophy still exists but is now too fragile to be used, so an exact replica was made by Toye, Kenning and Spencer and has been in use since the 1992 final. The replica of the original, last used in 1910, was presented to the FA's long-serving president Lord Kinnaird. It was sold at Christie's in 2005 to David Gold. Gold has loaned this trophy to the National Football Museum in Manchester where it is on permanent display.

== Calendar ==
The format of the FA Cup for the season had two preliminary rounds, five qualifying rounds, four proper rounds, and the semi-finals and final.

Round	Date
Extra preliminary round	Saturday 10 September 1910
Preliminary round	Saturday 17 September 1910
First round qualifying	Saturday 1 October 1910
Second round qualifying	Saturday 15 October 1910
Third round qualifying	Saturday 5 November 1910
Fourth round qualifying	Saturday 19 November 1910
Fifth round qualifying	Saturday 3 December 1910
First round proper	Saturday 14 January 1911
Second round proper	Saturday 4 February 1911
Third round proper	Saturday 25 February 1911
Fourth round proper	Saturday 11 March 1911
Semi-finals	Saturday 25 March 1911
Final	Saturday 22 April 1911

== Qualifying rounds ==
The 12 clubs winning through to the main draw from the fifth qualifying round were Football League Second Division outfit Gainsborough Trinity along with non-league sides Luton Town, Stoke, Crewe Alexandra, Watford, Accrington Stanley, Southend United, Croydon Common, Chesterfield, Exeter City, Darlington and New Brompton. For the first time, all qualifying teams had appeared in the first round before, although Darlington had not featured at this stage since 1887-88.

Ironically, Gainsborough Trinity would be voted out of the Football League in 1912, while, of the others, only Croydon Common would not have become a member of the League by 1921.

At the other end of the qualifying stages, 28 clubs were entered in the extra preliminary round, with most of those being from the West Midlands. However, none of the clubs from this stage progressed past the first qualifying round.

== First round proper ==
36 of the 40 clubs from the First and Second divisions joined the 12 clubs who came through the qualifying rounds. The remaining sides, Stockport County, Lincoln City, Huddersfield Town and Gainsborough Trinity were entered in the fourth qualifying round. Huddersfield lost to Lincoln City and Stockport County lost to Rochdale in that round, while Lincoln City then lost to Stoke in the fifth qualifying round.

Sixteen non-league sides were given byes to the first round to bring the total number of teams up to 64. These were:

Southampton Millwall Athletic Queens Park Rangers Crystal Palace	Swindon Town Plymouth Argyle Leyton Portsmouth	Northampton Town Bristol Rovers Norwich City Grimsby Town	West Ham United Brighton & Hove Albion Coventry City Brentford

Grimsby Town had been voted out of the Football League during the 1910 close-season and were competing in the Midland League, while the others were all from the Southern League First Division.

32 matches were scheduled to be played on Saturday, 14 January 1911. Four matches were drawn and went to replays in the following midweek fixture.

Tie no	Home team	Score	Away team	Date
1	Birmingham	1–1	Oldham Athletic	14 January 1911
Replay	Oldham Athletic	2–0	Birmingham	17 January 1911
2	Bristol City	0–3	Crewe Alexandra	14 January 1911
3	Burnley	2–0	Exeter City	14 January 1911
4	Liverpool	3–2	Gainsborough Trinity	14 January 1911
5	Stoke	1–2	Manchester City	14 January 1911
6	Watford	0–2	Barnsley	14 January 1911
7	Blackburn Rovers	5–1	Southend United	14 January 1911
8	The Wednesday	1–2	Coventry City	14 January 1911
9	Bolton Wanderers	0–2	Chesterfield	14 January 1911
10	Grimsby Town	3–0; Match void	Croydon Common	14 January 1911
Replay	Grimsby Town	8–1	Croydon Common	18 January 1911
11	Wolverhampton Wanderers	2–0	Accrington Stanley	14 January 1911
12	Middlesbrough	1–0	Glossop	14 January 1911
13	West Bromwich Albion	4–1	Fulham	14 January 1911
14	Derby County	2–1	Plymouth Argyle	14 January 1911
15	Swindon Town	3–1	Notts County	14 January 1911
16	Sheffield United	0–1	Darlington	14 January 1911
17	Leicester Fosse	3–1	Southampton	14 January 1911
18	Newcastle United	6–1	Bury	14 January 1911
19	New Brompton	0–1	Bradford City	14 January 1911
20	Tottenham Hotspur	2–1	Millwall Athletic	14 January 1911
21	Brentford	0–1	Preston North End	14 January 1911
22	Bristol Rovers	0–0	Hull City	14 January 1911
Replay	Hull City	1–0	Bristol Rovers	17 January 1911
23	Northampton Town	5–1	Luton Town	14 January 1911
24	Portsmouth	1–4	Aston Villa	14 January 1911
25	West Ham United	2–1	Nottingham Forest	14 January 1911
26	Manchester United	2–1	Blackpool	14 January 1911
27	Norwich City	3–1	Sunderland	14 January 1911
28	Leeds City	1–3	Brighton & Hove Albion	14 January 1911
29	Clapton Orient	1–2	Woolwich Arsenal	16 January 1911
30	Crystal Palace	0–4	Everton	14 January 1911
31	Chelsea	0–0	Leyton	14 January 1911
Replay	Leyton	0–2	Chelsea	18 January 1911
32	Bradford Park Avenue	5–3	Queens Park Rangers	14 January 1911

== Second round proper ==
The sixteen second-round matches were played on Saturday, 4 February 1911. Four matches were drawn, with the replays taking place in the following midweek fixture.

Tie no	Home team	Score	Away team	Date
1	Darlington	2–1	Bradford Park Avenue	4 February 1911
2	Burnley	2–0	Barnsley	4 February 1911
3	Blackburn Rovers	0–0	Tottenham Hotspur	4 February 1911
Replay	Tottenham Hotspur	0–2	Blackburn Rovers	8 February 1911
4	Wolverhampton Wanderers	1–0	Manchester City	4 February 1911
5	Crewe Alexandra	1–5	Grimsby Town	4 February 1911
6	Middlesbrough	0–0	Leicester Fosse	4 February 1911
Replay	Leicester Fosse	1–2	Middlesbrough	8 February 1911
7	Derby County	2–0	West Bromwich Albion	4 February 1911
8	Everton	2–1	Liverpool	4 February 1911
9	Swindon Town	1–0	Woolwich Arsenal	4 February 1911
10	Newcastle United	1–1	Northampton Town	4 February 1911
Replay	Newcastle United	1–0	Northampton Town	8 February 1911
11	West Ham United	3–0	Preston North End	4 February 1911
12	Brighton & Hove Albion	0–0	Coventry City	4 February 1911
Replay	Coventry City	2–0	Brighton & Hove Albion	8 February 1911
13	Manchester United	2–1	Aston Villa	4 February 1911
14	Bradford City	2–1	Norwich City	4 February 1911
15	Hull City	1–0	Oldham Athletic	4 February 1911
16	Chelsea	4–1	Chesterfield	4 February 1911

== Third round proper ==
The eight third-round matches were scheduled for Saturday, 25 February 1911. There were no replays.

Tie no	Home team	Score	Away team	Date
1	Darlington	0–3	Swindon Town	25 February 1911
2	Burnley	5–0	Coventry City	25 February 1911
3	Wolverhampton Wanderers	0–2	Chelsea	25 February 1911
4	Middlesbrough	0–3	Blackburn Rovers	25 February 1911
5	Derby County	5–0	Everton	25 February 1911
6	Newcastle United	3–2	Hull City	25 February 1911
7	West Ham United	2–1	Manchester United	25 February 1911
8	Bradford City	1–0	Grimsby Town	25 February 1911

== Fourth round proper ==
The four fourth-round matches were scheduled for Saturday, 11 March 1911. There were no replays.

Tie no	Home team	Score	Away team	Date
1	Newcastle United	4–0	Derby County	11 March 1911
2	West Ham United	2–3	Blackburn Rovers	11 March 1911
3	Bradford City	1–0	Burnley	11 March 1911
4	Chelsea	3–1	Swindon Town	11 March 1911

== Semi-finals ==
The semi-final matches were played on Saturday, 25 March 1911. Both matches were 3–0 wins, to Newcastle United and Bradford City won, going on to meet each other in the final.

25 March 1911
15:00

Newcastle United	3–0	Chelsea

St Andrew's, Birmingham

25 March 1911
15:00

Bradford City	3–0	Blackburn Rovers

Bramall Lane, Sheffield

== Final ==
The Final was the 40th FA Cup final. It was contested by Bradford City and Newcastle United. The first game resulted in a goalless draw at Crystal Palace. A single goal scored by Jimmy Speirs for Bradford won the replay at Old Trafford.

=== Match details ===
22 April 1911

Bradford City	0–0	Newcastle United

Crystal Palace, London
Attendance: 69,068
Referee: John Pearson

Bradford City	Newcastle United

==== Replay ====
26 April 1911

Bradford City	1–0	Newcastle United
Speirs 15'

Old Trafford, Manchester
Attendance: 66,646
Referee: John Pearson

Bradford City	Newcastle United

== See also ==
- FA Cup Final Results 1872-
