= Willie Gildea =

Scottish footballer (1884–1949)

Personal information
- Full name: William Franklyn Gildea
- Date of birth: October 1884
- Place of birth: Broxburn, Scotland
- Date of death: 1949 (aged 64–65)
- Position: Centre half

Senior career*
Years	Team	Apps	(Gls)
- Lochgelly St Patrick's
1909–1910	Falkirk	1	(0)
1910–1911	Bradford City	7	(0)
1911–1912	Birmingham	18	(1)
1912–19??	Belfast Celtic		
- * Club domestic league appearances and goals

William Franklyn Gildea (October 1884 – 1949) was a Scottish footballer who played as a centre half. He played for Falkirk in the Scottish League, for Bradford City and Birmingham in the English Football League, and for Belfast Celtic in the Irish League.

== Life and career ==
Gildea was born in October 1884 in Broxburn, in what was then Linlithgowshire. He had two brothers, Peter and Harry, who also became professional footballers.

Gildea played at centre half for Lochgelly St Patrick's. After he "performed fairly well" as a triallist in a Scottish Union match in February 1909, he signed for Falkirk, and was retained for the following season. Mainly a reserve player, he came into the league side only once, on 29 January 1910 at home to Heart of Midlothian, when captain John Anderson was unfit. He was transfer-listed at the end of the season, and in August 1910, he followed team-mate Archie Devine to English First Division club Bradford City.

Unlike Devine, Gildea had to wait for his debut. He played reserve-team football for his first few months, until, in February 1911, Bradford City completed his transfer, for a fee of £60, and he became eligible for the first team. With both regular full backs injured, Gildea came into a reshuffled defence to face Blackburn Rovers at Valley Parade on 28 February. City won 1–0, the Leeds Mercury reporter noted him as "a centre-half of undoubted ability", and he kept his place for the next two matches, the second of which was the FA Cup quarter-final against Burnley. City opened the scoring in the first half, and despite an injury to Gildea that forced him to play on the wing for half the match, they retained their lead. He returned to fitness in time for the semi-final, a 3–0 win against Blackburn Rovers in which he and Jimmy McDonald "stuck grimly" to England international forward Jock Simpson "and generally prevented him from becoming dangerous." The Scottish Referee newspaper described his rise as "of a meteoric order", having "developed so much that there are now few better men in the position."

Gildea played a further five First Division matches before the Cup Final, against Newcastle United at Crystal Palace. The match ended goalless, and he suffered an injury which meant his place went to Bob Torrance for the replay at Old Trafford, which Bradford City won 1–0, as well as for the last two league games of the season. The Football Association granted the club's request for permission to award him a winners' medal despite his absence from the decisive match. Gildea finished the season with seven appearances in league competition and three in the FA Cup, but began the next back in the reserves, and signed for Second Division club Birmingham in September 1911 for a fee reported as nearly £1,000.

Gildea went straight into the team for the visit to Stockport County on 23 September, which Birmingham lost 2–0, and kept his place for 20 matches. He scored his first goal in senior English football on 28 October against Grimsby Town, making the score 1–1 "in the tussle following [a] well-placed corner kick"; the game ended as a 2–2 draw. Birmingham's FA Cup first-round tie against Barnsley ended without a goal; in the replay, Gildea damaged a shoulder early on, winger Jimmy Conlin injured his arm so badly he had to leave the field, and Birmingham were overrun. In response to a series of poor results, the directors selected an experimental line-up for the next match which included four debutants, one of whom, Alec McClure, replaced the injured Gildea at centre half; the team played well, kept a clean sheet for the first time in a league match since November, and won. Gildea never returned to the first team; he finished the season with the reserves, and returned to Scotland.

He signed for Irish Football League club Belfast Celtic in October 1912 as cover for the ageing Ireland international centre half Jimmy Connor while he was indisposed. He played until the end of the year, after which he lost his place.

Gildea died in 1949.

== Sources ==
- Frost, Terry (1988). Bradford City A Complete Record 1903–1988. Derby: Breedon Books Sport. ISBN 0-907969-38-0.
- Matthews, Tony (1995). Birmingham City: A Complete Record. Derby: Breedon Books. ISBN 978-1-85983-010-9.
