= Bob Torrance =

Scottish footballer (1888–1918)

Personal information
- Full name: Robert Torrance
- Date of birth: 1888
- Place of birth: Kirkintilloch, Scotland
- Date of death: 24 April 1918 (aged 30)
- Place of death: Ypres salient, Belgium
- Position: Defender

Senior career*
Years	Team	Apps	(Gls)
- Kirkintilloch Rob Roy
1908–1917	Bradford City	161	(0)
- * Club domestic league appearances and goals

Robert Torrance (1888 – 24 April 1918) was a Scottish footballer who played in defence for hometown team Kirkintilloch Rob Roy and Bradford City.

He joined Bradford City in August 1908 and for three years was a hard-working understudy to the first team players. He had played just 36 league games in his first three seasons and one FA Cup game before he played in the 1911 FA Cup Final replay as replacement for the injured Willie Gildea. City won 1–0, with Torrance being considered the 'Man of the Match'.

Torrance became more involved in first team games, playing 23 league games the following season and all seven games during City's FA Cup defence, and more than 30 in the three seasons before league football was suspended for the First World War. His last game for City was a wartime regional game against Barnsley in March 1917.

Torrance, along with City's FA Cup winning captain Jimmy Speirs, was one of the club's players to die during service in the First World War whilst a gunner with the Royal Field Artillery. He was severely wounded in the arm by shell fragments on the Ypres Salient during the German spring offensive, and was killed by shellfire while being treated in hospital.

== Honours ==
Bradford City

- FA Cup: 1910–11
