= Kildee =

Kildee is a surname. Notable people with the surname include:

- Dale Kildee (1929–2021), Congressman from Michigan
- Dan Kildee (born 1958), Congressman from Michigan

== See also ==
- Gildea
- Gilday
