= James Riddell (footballer) =

Scottish footballer

Personal information
- Full name: James Hamilton Riddell
- Date of birth: 6 February 1891
- Place of birth: Hutchesontown, Scotland
- Date of death: 1952 (aged 60–61)
- Position: Half back

Youth career
- Ashfield

Senior career*
Years	Team	Apps	(Gls)
1912–1913	Rangers	1	(0)
1913–1916	Dumbarton	95	(6)
1916–1917	Rangers	23	(3)
1917–1918	Clyde	2	(0)
1917–1920	Rangers	6	(0)
1918	Partick Thistle (loan)	1	(0)
1918	Kilmarnock (loan)	3	(0)
1919	Dumbarton (loan)	11	(0)
1919–1920	St Mirren	28	(2)
1920–1923	Millwall	105	(6)
1923–1925	Fulham	37	(0)
1925–1928	Wigan Borough	88	(2)
1928–1929	Caernarfon		
- * Club domestic league appearances and goals

James Hamilton Riddell (6 February 1891 – 1952) was a Scottish footballer who played for Rangers, Dumbarton, Clyde, Partick Thistle, Kilmarnock, St Mirren, Millwall, Fulham, Wigan Borough and Caernarfon.
