= Alfred Gettins =

English footballer

Personal information
- Date of birth: July 1886
- Place of birth: Manchester, England
- Date of death: 1949 (aged 62–63)
- Position: Forward

Youth career
- Adlington

Senior career*
Years	Team	Apps	(Gls)
1904–1905	Bolton Wanderers		
1905–1906	Blackpool		
1906–1907	Luton Town		
1907–1908	Queens Park Rangers		
1908–1909	Aston Villa		
1909–1910	Brighton & Hove Albion		
1910–1911	Fulham		
1911–1912	Portsmouth		
1912–1914	Partick Thistle	31	(5)
1914–1916	Dumbarton	51	(10)
1922–1923	Stenhousemuir	16	(5)
- * Club domestic league appearances and goals

Alfred G. Gettins (July 1886 – 1949) was an English footballer who played for Bolton Wanderers, Blackpool, Luton Town, Queens Park Rangers, Aston Villa, Brighton & Hove Albion, Fulham, Portsmouth, Partick Thistle and Dumbarton.
