= Jimmy Lawrence =

Scottish footballer and manager (1879–1934)

Personal information
- Date of birth: 16 February 1879
- Place of birth: Partick, Scotland
- Date of death: 21 November 1934 (aged 55)
- Place of death: Glasgow, Scotland
- Height: 5 ft 8 1/2 in (1.74 m)
- Position: Goalkeeper

Senior career*
Years	Team	Apps	(Gls)
1900–1902	Partick Athletic		
1902–1904	Glasgow Perthshire		
1904	Hibernian	3	(0)
1904–1922	Newcastle United	432	(0)

International career
1911	Scotland	1	(0)

Managerial career
- 1922–1923: South Shields
- 1923–1925: Preston North End
- 1925–1933: Karlsruher FV
Medal record
Newcastle United
- * Club domestic league appearances and goals

James Lawrence (16 February 1879 – 21 November 1934) was a Scottish football player and manager. A goalkeeper, he played for Newcastle United between 1904 and 1922.

== Playing career ==
Born in Partick, Lawrence's first club was Partick Athletic, from where he moved to Glasgow Perthshire. Although still connected to Glasgow Perthshire, he played three matches in 1904 for Edinburgh side Hibernian when their regular custodian Harry Rennie was unavailable. He played with Newcastle for eighteen years after joining the Tyneside club in 1904 and still holds the record for making the most appearances for them - 432 league appearances, 496 matches in total.

With Newcastle he won the English Championship in 1905, 1907 and 1909, and the FA Cup in 1910, also playing on the losing side in the finals of 1905, 1906, 1908 and 1911.

In 1911, he also represented the Scotland national team on one occasion, a 1–1 draw with England at Goodison Park in Liverpool in the British Home Championship.

== Managerial career ==
Lawrence showed an aptitude for administration when acting as chairman of The Players' Union in his later days at Newcastle, and after his playing retirement he moved into management. His first appointment was with then Second Division side South Shields (1922–23) before joining Preston North End. He stayed with the Lilywhites until 1925, when he relocated to Germany to manage Karlsruher FV. With this club he won the regional championship of Württemberg/Baden in 1926 and of Baden in 1928, 1929, 1931 and 1932 which qualified the club to participate in the matches for the German football championship.

Lawrence later returned to Scotland and in 1933 was elected chairman of Stranraer. He died while in office a year later.

== Personal life ==
He was thought to have been born in 1885, and used this year in his registration documents with Newcastle United, but sports historian Andy Mitchell found that he was in fact born six years earlier (along with a twin sister); this discovery makes him Newcastle United's oldest ever player.

== Honours ==
=== Player ===
Newcastle United

- Football League championship: 1904–05, 1906–07, 1908–09
- FA Cup winner: 1910
  - Runner-up: 1905, 1906, 1908, 1911

=== Manager ===
Karlsruher FV

- Baden regional championship: 1926, 1928, 1929, 1931, 1932
