= David Willis (English footballer) =

English footballer

Personal information
- Full name: David Lalty Willis
- Date of birth: 16 July 1881
- Place of birth: Byker, England
- Date of death: 26 May 1949 (aged 67)
- Position: Wing half

Senior career*
Years	Team	Apps	(Gls)
- Gateshead N.E.R.
1902–?	Sunderland	1	(0)
?–1904	Reading		
1904–1906	Sunderland	47	(2)
1907–1913	Newcastle United	95	(3)
- Reading
- Palmer's
Total		143	(5)
- * Club domestic league appearances and goals

David Lalty Willis (16 July 1881 – 26 May 1949) was an English professional footballer who played as a wing half in the Football League for Newcastle United and Sunderland.

== Personal life ==
Willis served as a private in the Royal Army Service Corps during the First World War.

== Career statistics ==
Appearances and goals by club, season and competition
Club	Season	League			FA Cup		Other		Total	
Club	Season	Division	Apps	Goals	Apps	Goals	Apps	Goals	Apps	Goals
Sunderland	1902–03	First Division	1	0	0	0	―		1	0
Sunderland	1904–05	First Division	5	0	0	0	―		5	0
Sunderland	1905–06	First Division	29	2	4	0	―		33	2
Sunderland	1906–07	First Division	13	0	0	0	―		13	0
Sunderland	Total		48	2	4	0	―		52	2
Newcastle United	1907–08	First Division	20	1	3	0	―		23	1
Newcastle United	1908–09	First Division	20	1	1	0	1 (Note: Appearance in FA Charity Shield)	0	22	1
Newcastle United	1909–10	First Division	10	0	4	0	―		14	0
Newcastle United	1910–11	First Division	10	1	4	1	―		14	2
Newcastle United	1911–12	First Division	33	0	0	0	―		33	0
Newcastle United	1912–13	First Division	2	0	0	0	―		2	0
Newcastle United	Total		95	3	11	1	1	0	107	4
Career total			143	5	15	1	1	0	159	6

== Honours ==
Newcastle United

- Football League First Division: 1908–09
- FA Cup: 1909–10
- FA Charity Shield: 1909
