= Patrick Gilday =

American labor unionist (1862–1917)

Patrick Gilday (March 25, 1862 – September 14, 1917) was a United Mine Workers of America (UMWA) President of District Number 2, representing the Central Pennsylvania district, from 1902-1915, most famous for helping to settle the Danbury Hatters Case.

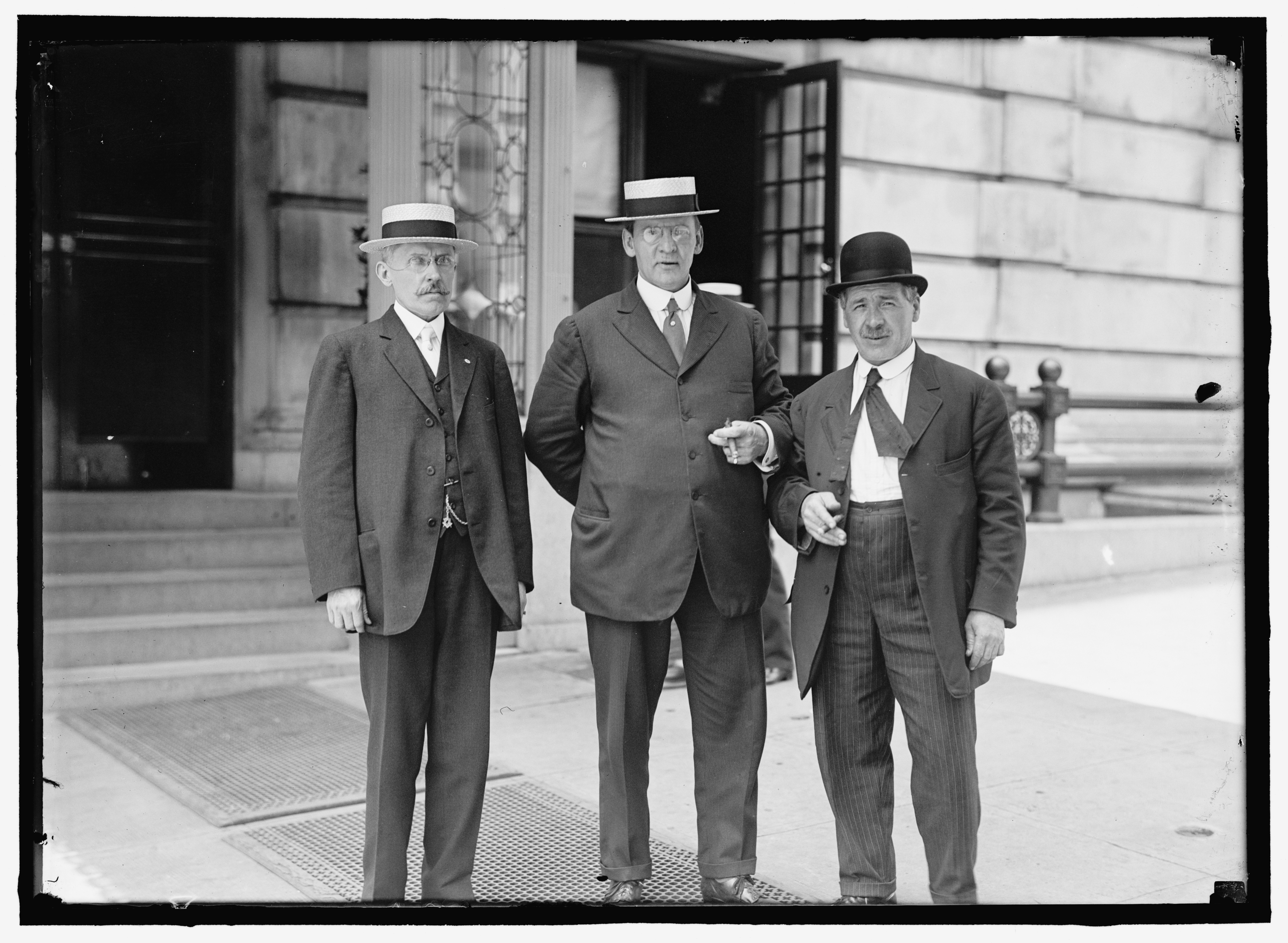

== Early life ==
Gilday was born Patrick Augusta Kilday on March 25, 1862 in Paisley, Scotland, to parents from Ireland. In 1881 he immigrated to the United States, settling in central Pennsylvania, where he met and married Mary McLaughlin, also an immigrant from Scotland, and would go on to have seven kids with her. Shortly after he also changed the spelling of his last name from "Kilday" to "Gilday".

== Career with UMWA ==
Gilday started work as a coal miner, but quickly advanced in positions as a labor leader. From 1902-1915 he served as President of District Number 2, Central Pennsylvania UMWA, which included the counties of Blair, Cambria, Cameron, Centre, Clarion, Clearfield, Clinton, Elk, Fulton, Huntingdon, Jefferson, Lycoming, McKean, Potter, Somerset, Tioga, part of Bedford, and most of Armstrong and Indiana.

During this time, after being asked by UMWA President William B. Wilson, Gilday also served in the position of National Mediator in labor disputes, and was involved in the Loewe v. Lawlor (also referred to as the Danbury Hatters) Case and the Colorado mining war settlements. On July 16, 1915, he was named by then Pennsylvania governor Martin Grove Brumbaugh as Chief of the Bureau of Mediation and Arbitration, part of the Pennsylvania department of Labor and Industry, working to settle many wage disputes between miners and their employers throughout the state of Pennsylvania.

== Death ==
In 1917 Patrick became ill and lingered for about six months before dying on September 14, leaving behind a widow (his second wife), 5 children from his first marriage and 8 from his second.
