= Colin Veitch =

England international footballer

Personal information
- Full name: Colin Campbell McKechnie Veitch
- Date of birth: 22 May 1881
- Place of birth: Heaton, Newcastle upon Tyne, England
- Date of death: 26 August 1938 (aged 57)
- Place of death: Bern, Switzerland
- Height: 5 ft 7 in (1.70 m)
- Positions: Half back; inside left

Senior career*
Years	Team	Apps	(Gls)
1899–1914	Newcastle United	322	(49)

International career
1906–1909	England	6	(0)

Managerial career
- 1926–1928: Bradford City
- * Club domestic league appearances and goals

Colin Campbell McKechnie Veitch (22 May 1881 – 26 August 1938) was an English football player in the early 20th century for Newcastle United and manager of Bradford City.

== Playing career ==
=== Newcastle United ===
Veitch was born in the Heaton area of Newcastle upon Tyne. At school he was both a gifted scholar and footballer, becoming the first captain of Newcastle Schools in 1895.

After enrolling at the city's Rutherford College, Veitch appeared for the College team, regarded at the time as one of the finest amateur teams in North East England, where he attracted the attention of Newcastle United for which he at first signed as an amateur before turning professional in the summer of 1899. Veitch made his debut in October 1899, a match which Newcastle United lost 1–0 to Wolverhampton Wanderers.

For a short spell, Veitch considered giving up his football career to pursue a career in academia, but after a spell in the reserves, playing under the pseudonym of 'Hamilton' he changed his mind.

Renowned for his versatility, Veitch captained the successful United side which won League Championships in 1905, 1907 and 1909, the FA Cup in 1910 and were FA Cup finalists in 1905, 1906, 1908 and 1911, and also represented England on six occasions. Off the pitch, he was an active member of the players' union.

Despite a dispute with Newcastle United in 1911, Veitch continued to play for the club until the outbreak of World War I, during which he served as a lieutenant in the Royal Garrison Artillery. After the war, he returned to St James' Park to become a coach, and in 1924 formed the junior side, Newcastle Swifts, the pioneers of the current Newcastle United juniors system. Veitch was sacked in 1926, ending a 26-year association with United.

=== Bradford City ===
In August 1926, Veitch was appointed manager of Bradford City. In his first season the club was relegated to Division Three (North). The following season City recorded their then record victory, 9–1 over Nelson and were mounting a promotion challenge. But in January 1927 Veitch resigned, deciding that football management was not for him.

== Personal life ==
Away from football, Veitch was a great lover of the arts and co-founded the People's Theatre, Newcastle upon Tyne in 1911. He was also an accomplished playwright, composer, conductor and producer, and counted George Bernard Shaw amongst his circle of friends.

Veitch served in France during the First World War as a 2nd Lieutenant in the Royal Garrison Artillery.

Veitch was also very politically aware and was approached to stand as a Member of Parliament for the Labour Party. Although he turned the proposal down, he did become a union activist for the Professional Footballers' Association and was the PFA's chairman for a number of years.

After resigning from Bradford City he returned to Tyneside and became a journalist with the Evening Chronicle. In 1929 he was banned from the St James' Park press box.

In 1938, Veitch contracted pneumonia and died aged 57 in Bern, Switzerland whilst on a recuperation holiday.

== Honours ==
=== As a player ===
Newcastle United

- Football League First Division: 1904–05, 1906–07, 1908–09
- FA Cup winner: 1910
- FA Cup finalist: 1905, 1906, 1908,1911.
