= Peter Logan (footballer, born 1889) =

Scottish footballer (1889–1944)

Personal information
- Date of birth: 1889
- Place of birth: Edinburgh, Scotland
- Date of death: April 1944 (aged 54)
- Place of death: Bradford, England
- Height: 5 ft 8 in (1.73 m)
- Position: Inside right

Senior career*
Years	Team	Apps	(Gls)
- Alva Rangers
- St Bernard's
1908–1926	Bradford City	271	(37)
- * Club domestic league appearances and goals

Peter Logan (1889 – April 1944) was a Scottish professional footballer who played as an inside right. He spent 17 years with Bradford City, making over 300 appearances and winning the 1911 FA Cup Final.

== Early and personal life ==
Born in Edinburgh, he was the younger brother of footballer James Logan, who also played for Bradford City.

== Career ==
After playing for Alva Rangers and St Bernard's, he signed for Bradford City in October 1908. He won the 1911 FA Cup Final with the club. During World War I he "won representative honours for his army unit". He spent 17 years with the club, making 304 appearances in total. After retiring as a player in April 1925, he worked as a coach at the club until October 1925. He then became licensee of the Girlington Hotel. He died in April 1944, aged 54.

== Sources ==
- Frost, Terry (1988). Bradford City A Complete Record 1903-1988. Breedon Books Sport. ISBN 0-907969-38-0.
