= Peter Gildea =

Scottish footballer

Personal information
- Full name: Peter Gildea
- Date of birth: 1883
- Place of birth: Uphall, Scotland
- Date of death: 1940 (aged 56–57)
- Position: Outside right

Senior career*
Years	Team	Apps	(Gls)
- Lochgelly Rangers
–1904	Lochgelly United		
1904	Cowdenbeath		
1904–1906	Airdrieonians	34	(7)
1906–1907	Bury	44	(4)
- Lochgelly United
- * Club domestic league appearances and goals

Peter Gildea (1883–1940) was a Scottish professional football outside right who played in the Football League for Bury. He also played in the Scottish League for Airdrieonians and later served Celtic as a scout.

== Personal life ==
Gildea's brothers Harry and Willie were also footballers.

== Career statistics ==
Appearances and goals by club, season and competition
Club	Season	League			National Cup		Total	
Club	Season	Division	Apps	Goals	Apps	Goals	Apps	Goals
Airdrieonians	1904–05	Scottish First Division	9	1	0	0	9	1
Airdrieonians	1905–06	Scottish First Division	15	1	1	0	15	1
Airdrieonians	1906–07	Scottish First Division	10	5	0	0	10	5
Career total			34	7	1	0	35	7

== Honours ==
- Cowdenbeath Hall of Fame
