= Mark Mellors =

English footballer

Personal information
- Date of birth: 1880
- Place of birth: Basford, Nottingham, England
- Date of death: 1961 (aged 81)
- Place of death: Guiseley, England
- Position: Goalkeeper

Senior career*
Years	Team	Apps	(Gls)
- Notts County
- Brighton
–1909	Sheffield United		
1909–1918	Bradford City	68	(0)
- * Club domestic league appearances and goals

Mark Mellors (1880–1961) was an English footballer who played for Notts County, Brighton, Sheffield United and Bradford City, with whom he played in the 1911 FA Cup Final.

He retired in 1915.

He later became a successful businessman in the wool trade, and died in 1961 at the age of 81.
