= Harry Gildea =

Scottish footballer

Personal information
- Full name: Henry Gildea
- Date of birth: 1890
- Place of birth: Broxburn, Scotland
- Date of death: 9 April 1917 (aged 26–27)
- Place of death: Pas-de-Calais, France
- Position: Inside right

Youth career
- –1908: Lochgelly St Patrick's

Senior career*
Years	Team	Apps	(Gls)
1908–1909	Hibernian	6	(3)
1909–1910	Grimsby Town	3	(0)
1910–1911	Bristol City	1	(0)
1911–1912	Lochgelly United		
1912–1913	East Fife		
1913	Lochgelly United		
1913–1915	Dumbarton	27	(4)
1915–1916	Lochgelly United		
- * Club domestic league appearances and goals

Henry Gildea (1890 – 9 April 1917) was a Scottish professional footballer who played as an inside right for Hibernian, Grimsby Town, Bristol City, Lochgelly United, East Fife and Dumbarton.

== Personal life ==
Gildea's brothers Peter and Willie were also footballers. Gildea served as a private with the Black Watch during the First World War and was killed in action at the Battle of Arras on 9 April 1917. He was buried in Mindel Trench British Cemetery, Saint-Laurent-Blangy.

== Career statistics ==
Appearances and goals by club, season and competition
Club	Season	League			National cup (Note: Includes Scottish Cup, FA Cup)		Total	
Club	Season	Division	Apps	Goals	Apps	Goals	Apps	Goals
Hibernian	1908–09	Scottish First Division	6	3	0	0	6	3
Bristol City	1910–11	First Division	1	0	0	0	1	0
Dumbarton	1913–14	Scottish First Division	27	4	0	0	27	4
Career total			34	7	0	0	34	7
