= John Pearson (footballer, born 1868) =

English footballer (1868–1931)

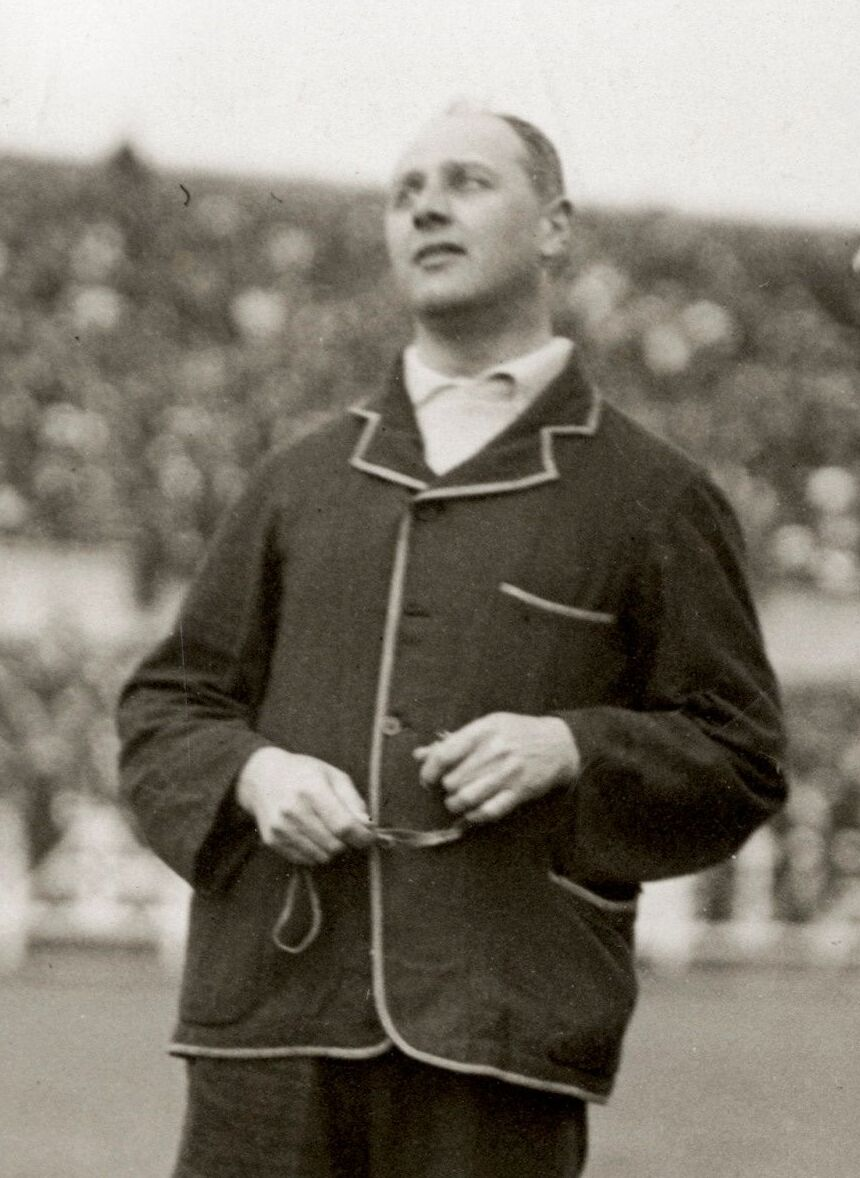
- Pearson as a referee in 1914

Personal information
- Full name: John Hargreaves Pearson
- Date of birth: 25 January 1868
- Place of birth: Crewe, England
- Date of death: 22 June 1931 (aged 63)
- Position: Inside right

Youth career
- 1881–1886: Crewe Alexandra

Senior career*
Years	Team	Apps	(Gls)
1886–1895	Crewe Alexandra	14	(3)

International career
1892	England	1	(0)
- * Club domestic league appearances and goals

John Hargreaves Pearson (25 January 1868 – 22 June 1931) was an English footballer who spent his entire club career with Crewe Alexandra, playing at inside right, and made one appearance for England in 1892. He later had a successful career as a referee, taking charge of the 1911 FA Cup Final as well as refereeing international matches.

== Playing career ==
Pearson was born in Crewe, Cheshire and joined Crewe Alexandra in the summer of 1881 at the age of 13. The club had only been formed a few years earlier and at that time only played "friendlies" and Cup matches. On 23 October 1886, Pearson scored twice in a 4–1 victory over Wrexham Olympic in the FA Cup first round. The following season he helped the "Alex" reach the FA Cup semi-finals, scoring the only goal to defeat Derby County 1–0 in round 5; after beating Middlesbrough in the next round, Crewe went out to Preston North End.

In 1889, Crewe were one of 12 clubs admitted to the newly formed Football Alliance where they spent three years, before becoming one of the founder members of the Football League Second Division in 1892.

While still playing in the Football Alliance, Pearson was one of five new caps called up for the England team to play Ireland on 5 March 1892. Pearson played at inside-right with fellow débutante Charlie Athersmith of Aston Villa alongside him at outside-right. The match was played at the Solitude ground, Belfast with England winning 2–0, both goals from Harry Daft of Notts County. This remains the only full England international appearance by a Crewe Alexandra player.

During Crewe's first season in the English Football League, injury restricted Pearson to only 12 league appearances from which he scored twice as the club finished the season in tenth place. Pearson only managed two matches in the following season, scoring once, before injury forced him to retire.

== Career as referee ==
He remained in football, qualifying as a referee and was on the English Football League list until 1914, and was given the honour of officiating the 1911 FA Cup Final between Bradford City and Newcastle United, which Bradford won 1–0 after a replay.

Pearson also refereed internationally, including the third-place match at the 1908 Olympics in London between Netherlands and Sweden. He continued to referee international matches up to the start of World War I, including a match between Netherlands and Belgium on 26 April 1914.

== Career outside football ==
His full-time employment was with the London and North Western Railway, which became part of the LMS in 1923. He retired in 1930, and died the following year aged 63.
