= Frank Thompson (footballer) =

Irish footballer and manager

Personal information
- Full name: Francis William Thompson
- Date of birth: 2 October 1885
- Place of birth: Ballynahinch, Ireland
- Date of death: 4 October 1950 (aged 65)
- Place of death: Ayr, Scotland
- Height: 5 ft 7 in (1.70 m)
- Position: Outside left

Senior career*
Years	Team	Apps	(Gls)
1905–1910	Cliftonville		
1910	Black Diamonds		
1910	Linfield		
1910–1913	Bradford City	51	(11)
1913–1924	Clyde	158	(29)

International career
1910–1914	Ireland	12	(2)

Managerial career
- 1922–1934: Clyde
- 1935–1939: Ayr United
- 1945–1947: Glentoran
- * Club domestic league appearances and goals

Francis William Thompson (2 October 1885 – 4 October 1950) was an Irish international football player and manager who played professionally in Ireland, England and Scotland.

== Career ==
While playing with Cliftonville, Thompson won the Irish League once and the Irish Cup twice. He then played briefly with Black Diamonds and Linfield before moving to England to play with Bradford City in December 1910. In his three years with the Bantams, he won the 1911 FA Cup Final and earned seven international caps for Ireland. (he collected twelve in total between 1910 and 1914). He then moved to Scotland with Clyde, eventually becoming their player-manager, and also spent time as manager of Ayr United, before returning to Ireland to become manager of Glentoran.

His 1911 FA Cup Final winners medal sold for £19,000 at a London auction for sporting memorabilia in 2003.

== Honours ==
=== Player ===
Clyde

- Glasgow Cup: 1914–15

Bradford City

- FA Cup 1910–11
