= Sandy Higgins =

Scottish footballer (1885–1939)

Personal information
- Full name: Alexander Higgins
- Date of birth: 4 November 1885
- Place of birth: Kilmarnock, Scotland
- Date of death: 15 March 1939 (aged 53)
- Place of death: England
- Position: Centre forward

Youth career
- Rugby XI

Senior career*
Years	Team	Apps	(Gls)
1904–1905	Kilmarnock	0	(0)
1905–1919	Newcastle United	126	(36)
1919–1920	Kilmarnock	26	(4)
1920–1921	Nottingham Forest		
1921–1922	Jarrow		
1922–1923	Norwich City		
1923–1924	Wallsend		

International career
1910–1911	Scotland	4	(1)
- * Club domestic league appearances and goals

Alexander Higgins MM (4 November 1885 – 15 March 1939) was a Scottish footballer who played as a forward for Newcastle United, Kilmarnock, Nottingham Forest, Jarrow, Norwich City and the Scotland national team.

== Career ==
Higgins was described as a player who could go by players with ease, but sometimes would be selfish with the ball and would try to do more than passing a simple ball. He won a Football League Championship and FA Cup with Newcastle United, playing for the club between 1905 and 1919, appearing in 150 games and scoring 41 goals.

He later played for hometown club Kilmarnock, (where he had also been prior to joining Newcastle, without playing a first team game) and was with the club when they won the 1920 Scottish Cup, but did not play in the final because his father (Sandy Higgins Snr, also a footballer who had played for Kilmarnock as well as Derby County and Nottingham Forest) died on the same day – but still was awarded the medal due to the circumstances.

Higgins won four caps for Scotland, all while with Newcastle United.

== Personal life ==
Higgins served as a corporal in the East Yorkshire Regiment and the Durham Light Infantry during the First World War and won the Military Medal during the course of his service.

== Honours ==
Newcastle United

- Football League First Division: 1908–09
- FA Cup: 1909–10

Kilmarnock

- Scottish Cup: 1919–20
