= Archie Devine =

Scottish footballer (1886–1964)

Personal information
- Full name: Archibald Forbes Devine
- Date of birth: 2 April 1886
- Place of birth: Lochore, Scotland
- Date of death: 30 September 1964 (aged 78)
- Place of death: Lochgelly, Scotland
- Height: 5 ft 9 1/2 in (1.77 m)
- Position: Inside left

Senior career*
Years	Team	Apps	(Gls)
- Minto Rovers
- Lochgelly Rangers
- Lochgelly United
1905–1909	Heart of Midlothian	4	(1)
1906–1907	→ Lochgelly United (loan)		
1907–1908	→ Raith Rovers (loan)	21	(9)
1908–1910	Falkirk	43	(17)
1910–1913	Bradford City	48	(9)
1913–1914	Woolwich Arsenal	24	(5)
1914–1915	Shelbourne		
1915–1919	Lochgelly United		
1919–1920	Dunfermline Athletic		
1920–1921	Lochgelly United		

International career
1910	Scottish League XI	1	(0)
1910	Scotland	1	(1)
- * Club domestic league appearances and goals

Archibald Forbes Devine (2 April 1886 – 30 September 1964) was a Scottish international footballer.

== Life and career ==
Devine was born in Lochore, Fife. He began his career in junior football with Minto Rovers, Lochgelly Rangers and Lochgelly United, moving on to Heart of Midlothian in early 1905 and then joining Raith Rovers. It was at Falkirk that he came to prominence, scoring 13 goals in 25 appearances in 1909–10. This earned him an international cap for Scotland, against Wales on 5 March 1910. Devine scored the only goal in a 1–0 win for Scotland, but he never played for the national side again. He also made one appearance for the Scottish League XI in that season, in a 3–2 win against the English Football League XI.

In April 1910 he moved south of the border to Bradford City, and was part of the side that won the 1911 FA Cup Final against Newcastle United. He stayed at Bradford for nearly three years before joining Woolwich Arsenal for an Arsenal club record transfer fee of £1,300. He made his debut for Arsenal against Chelsea on 15 February 1913, and was part of the team that were relegated from the Football League First Division in 1912–13. He started the 1913–14 season as a regular, and scored the winner in Arsenal's first match at Highbury, a 2–1 victory over Leicester Fosse on 6 September 1913.

However, later that same season Devine was forced out of the side by Wally Hardinge, and left the club; he played 24 games for Arsenal, scoring five goals. He later played for Shelbourne, where he was a member of the Irish Gold Cup-winning team in 1915. He returned to Scotland and played for Cowdenbeath, Lochgelly United, and Dunfermline Athletic. After retiring he worked as a miner and a docker. He died in September 1964, aged 78.
