= 2007–08 Bradford City A.F.C. season =

Bradford City A.F.C.
2007–08 season
- Chairman: Mark Lawn; Julian Rhodes
- Manager: Stuart McCall
- Football League Two: 10th
- FA Cup: Second Round
- League Cup: First Round
- Football League Trophy: First Round
- Top goalscorer: League: Peter Thorne (14); All: Peter Thorne (15)
- Highest home attendance: 15,510 (v Lincoln City, 26 December 2007)
- Lowest home attendance: 13,072 (v Barnet, 8 April 2008); 4,069 (v Chester City, FA Cup, 10 November 2007)
Home colours	Away colours

The 2007–08 season was the 105th season in Bradford City A.F.C.'s history, their 93rd in The Football League and 95th in the league system of English football. After finishing 22nd in League One during the 2006–07 season, Bradford City were relegated to League Two meaning the season would be their first in the bottom tier of The Football League since 1981–82. It was also Stuart McCall's first season as manager, after he was appointed the full-time successor to Colin Todd in May 2007. It covers a period from 1 July 2007 to 30 June 2008.

McCall brought in seven new signings in pre-season, as well as a number of loan players, but from September to November, the club failed to win in eight games, leaving them in 21st place in League Two. The club improved during the latter part of the season, finishing in 10th place, three places and 16 points outside the play-offs. Bradford also suffered first round exits in two of the cup competitions they entered, and lost in the second round of the FA Cup. Peter Thorne was the club's top goalscorer, recording 15 goals, 14 in the league and one in the FA Cup. The season also marked centre back David Wetherall's retirement after 304 league games with the club. Joe Colbeck was named player of the season, despite spending part of the season on loan at Darlington. The club's average attendance of 13,756 was the highest in the division.

== Background ==
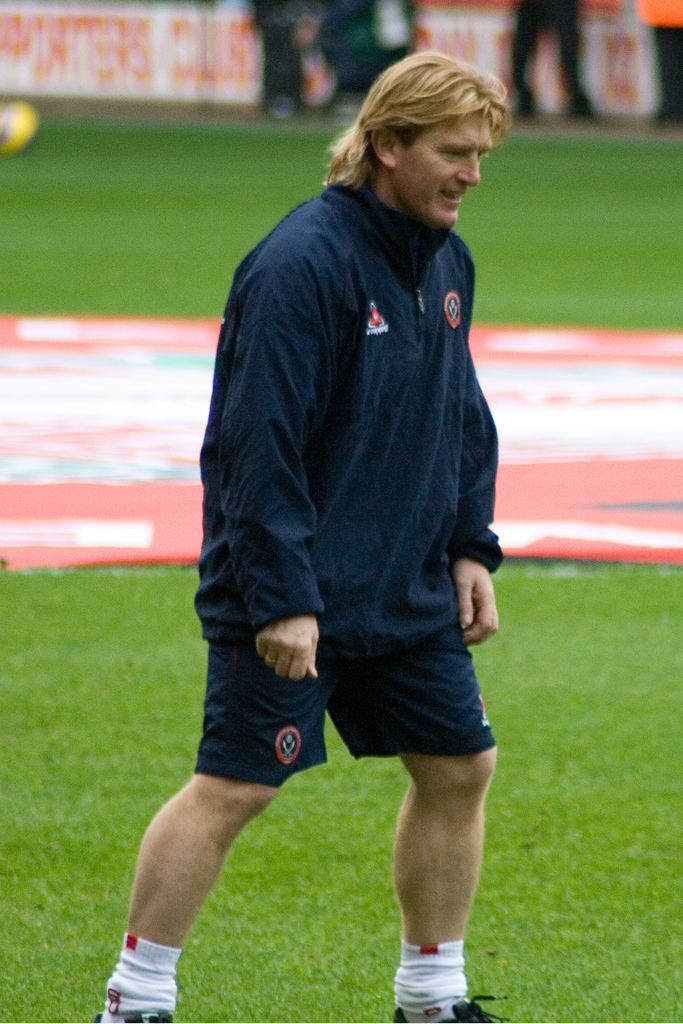
Former City player Stuart McCall was appointed manager in pre-season, joining from Sheffield United.

During the 2006–07 season, manager Colin Todd had been sacked because of a poor run of results. Club captain David Wetherall was originally appointed Todd's successor on a caretaker basis, before being handed the role until the end of the season, during the following month. Wetherall could not stop City's run of poor form, and the club were relegated to League Two on 28 April 2007 after a 3–0 defeat at Chesterfield. It was the club's third relegation in seven seasons, and meant the 2007–08 season would be their first season in the fourth division of English football in 25 years. On 22 May 2007, former City player Stuart McCall, who had played more than 400 games for the club during two previous spells, was announced as the club's new manager to take over on 1 June 2007. Although the club had just 13 players with first-team experience, the bookmakers made City second favourites to win the League Two title.

Despite the club's relegation, off the field, chairman Julian Rhodes had announced a deal to slash the price of watching professional football to just £138, the equivalent of £6 per match, and the cheapest season tickets in England. In June 2007, Rhodes was also joined by Mark Lawn as new joint chairman of the club. Lawn signed a deal to wipe out the club's debts.

== Review ==
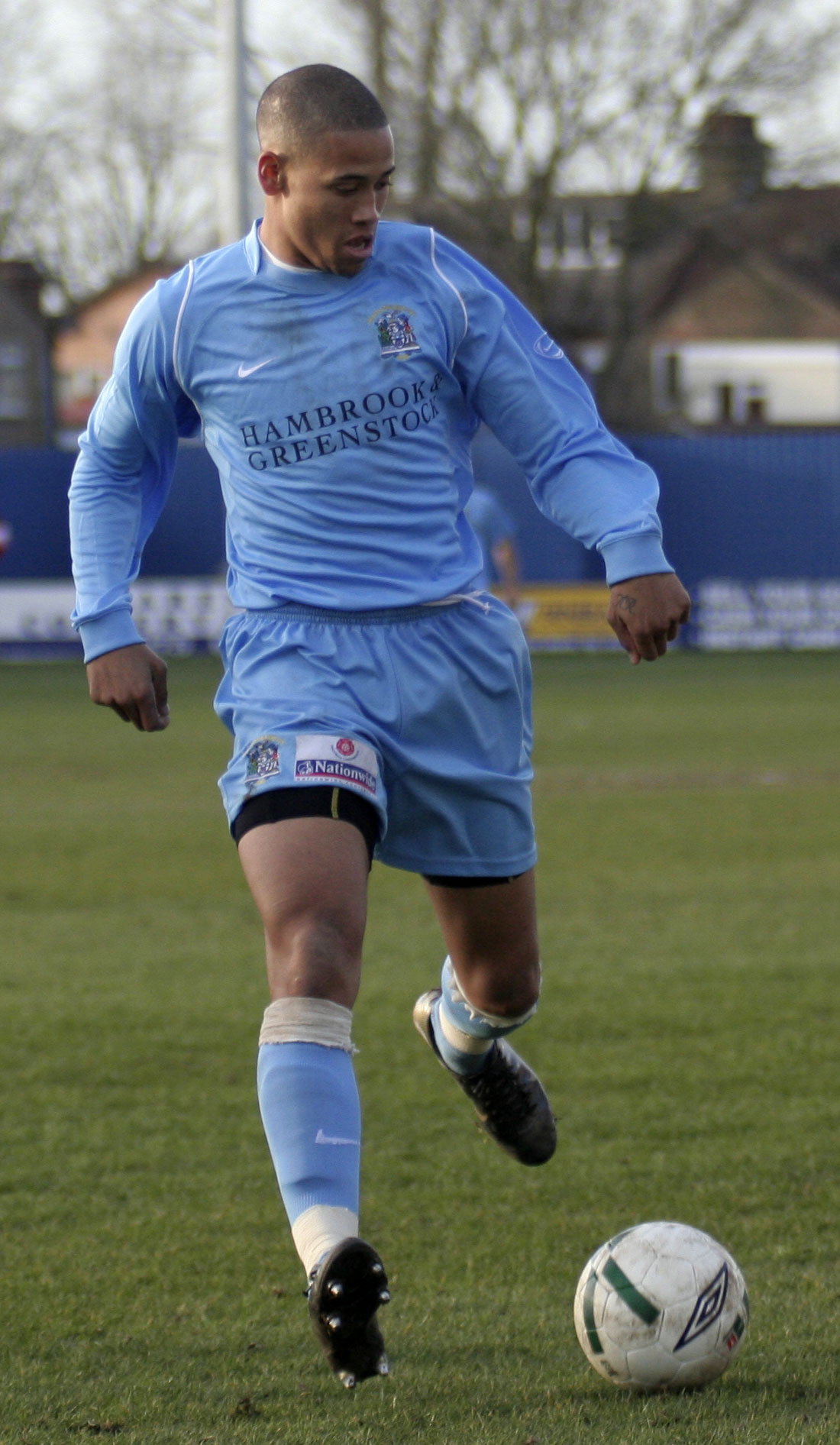
Left winger Alex Rhodes joined from Brentford following a trial

=== Pre-season ===
With just 13 players on the books, McCall's first job was to sign a number of new players to build a first-team squad. McCall's first signings were strikers Barry Conlon, from Mansfield Town, and Peter Thorne, from Norwich City, both on free transfers, on 2 July 2007. No more players were signed by the time City played their first pre-season friendly away at Harrogate Town on 16 July 2007. However, there were eight trialists in the team which won 1–0. The only goal of the game was a header from David Wetherall. Two days later, City were defeated 2–1 by Conference side Farsley Celtic, before a 2–0 victory against North Ferriby United. Scott Phelan, who had played all three of the pre-season games during a trial, became McCall's third signing on 24 July from Everton. The same day, City drew 1–1 with Burnley in their only home pre-season friendly open to fans, with a goal from Paul Evans. McCall signed full back Darren Williams, from Hartlepool United, Kyle Nix on a monthly contract, and Nathan Joynes on loan from Barnsley but released three other trialists. Joynes had been the third loan signing from Barnsley, following Paul Heckingbottom, who had played for Bradford in the 2003–04 season, and Thomas Harban. The following two friendlies both ended in defeat; first 1–0 to York City, then 2–1 to Blackpool in a private practice match, with another goal from Evans. Evans completed his transfer the following day, to be followed by Alex Rhodes, who had been on trial from Brentford, and Guylain Ndumbu-Nsungu on loan from Gillingham, the following week.

A new home and away strip for the season was announced, with the home shirts worn for the first time in the friendly against Burnley. The club also sold more than 12,000 season tickets, with 12,019 fans buying one before the end of the deadline for the cheap offer on 31 July.

=== August ===
Bradford City became the first visitors for a league game at New Meadow

Bradford started their league season on 11 August 2007 with a 1–1 draw with Macclesfield Town, when a crowd of 14,345 was inside Valley Parade, 1,000 more than was originally announced. The attendance was more than 6,000 higher than any other game in the division. Macclesfield had taken the lead, with City equalising shortly before half-time when Guylain Ndumbu-Nsungu scored with a rebound after Barry Conlon's penalty was saved. Four days later City were at Championship side Wolverhampton Wanderers, for the first round of the League Cup. Wolves scored twice in the first five minutes of the second half, and despite Kyle Nix pulling one back for Bradford, City went out 2–1. City's second league game of the season was the first league game to be played at Shrewsbury Town's new £15m ground the New Meadow, when an early penalty from former City player Dave Hibbert gave the home side a 1–0 win. McCall's first win as manager came in the third game when a debut goal from Luke Medley secured a 2–1 victory over Wrexham.

=== September ===
Bradford started September with consecutive defeats; first 2–1 in the league against Barnet, before a 5–1 loss to Doncaster Rovers in the Johnstone's Paint Trophy. For the latter game, McCall had named a weakened team, which included debutants Ben Saynor and Sean Taylforth, and City faced a £5,000 fine from The Football League, but were eventually only fined £3,000. Two victories in the league followed against Lincoln City—the first time the two teams had met in a league game since the fire disaster in 1985— and Peterborough United. But the month ended as it had started with back-to-back defeats against Hereford United and Wycombe Wanderers.

=== October ===
The run of consecutive defeats extended to five during the first two weeks of October. After a 3–0 defeat to Accrington Stanley, McCall added two more loan signings to the squad, Nicky Law, son of former City manager Nicky Law, and goalkeeper Rhys Evans. Both played as City lost 2–1 to both Milton Keynes Dons, when Barry Conlon scored his first goal for the club, then Morecambe. The run of defeats came to an end when City drew 0–0 with Darlington, but the month ended without a single victory after another draw, this time 1–1 with Grimsby Town, when Rhys Evans was substituted after 24 minutes for City, and Ndumbu-Nsungu scored a late equaliser following Grimsby's own goalkeeper Phil Barnes' red card. Evans' loan deal was cut short following the injury and he returned to Blackpool after just four games. Young midfielder Joe Colbeck, who had been one of several players McCall wanted to send out on loan to gain first team experience, was loaned out to Darlington for a month.

=== November ===
Bradford's run without a league victory extended to eight games after a 2–1 defeat to Brentford. The run, which stretched back to 15 September came to an end with a 2–1 win over Chester City on 6 November 2007 when Alex Rhodes scored his first goal for the club. City again defeated Chester City four days later, this time in the FA Cup, when Peter Thorne's first goal for the club secured a 1–0 win. City won their third game in a row with a 4–1 victory over Dagenham & Redbridge—their highest victory of the season, before the month ended with a 1–1 draw against Stockport County.

=== December ===
Bradford were eliminated from the FA Cup with a 3–0 defeat to League One side Tranmere Rovers. They returned to league action with two more draws, away to Mansfield Town and Chesterfield, the latter game of which featured Joe Colbeck, who had returned from Darlington early despite his one-month loan spell being originally extended. The following week City signed Willy Topp for £35,000—the first time they had paid a transfer fee for a player since Andy Tod in November 2001—nearly three months after he first came on trial. City were given two weeks off before their next game, when their home game against Rotherham United on 15 December was postponed because of a frozen pitch. But they could not take advantage of the extra rest and despite taking the lead against Peterborough United, two second half goals gave Peterborough a 2–1 win and helped them to second in the league. The highest attendance of the season for a League Two game attended City's next game on Boxing Day against Lincoln City. It was the first time the two teams had met in the league at Valley Parade since the fire of 1985 and the crowd of 15,510 observed a minute silence and wreath-laying ceremony before the game. Peter Thorne gave City the lead, and despite an equaliser from Lincoln, Barry Conlon secured a 2–1 win for Bradford in the last minute. The 2007 calendar year finished with another home game, but this time City lost 3–1 to Hereford United.

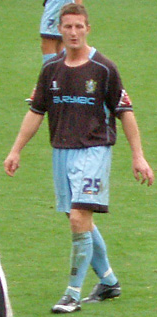
Lee Bullock joined from Hartlepool United in January on a free transfer after a loan spell

=== January ===
The New Year started with a number of changes off the field. Loan signing Ndumbu-Nsungu returned to Gillingham but Heckingbottom's deal was extended to allow him to play against Accrington Stanley on New Year's Day, before a permanent deal was finalised the following week. Midfielder Lee Bullock was also signed on a loan transfer from Hartlepool United. City beat Accrington 2–0 with Matthew Clarke scoring his first for the club and Joe Colbeck adding his first since he returned from his loan spell at Darlington. It was followed up with another win, when Thorne scored City's first hat-trick for two years, to defeat Notts County 3–0. Two away draws followed at Bury and Wrexham, but City returned to winning ways with a 4–2 victory over Shrewsbury Town to finish the month unbeaten.

McCall had also been busy in the transfer market during January, with the trio of Ben Starosta, Scott Loach and TJ Moncur all arriving on loan. Bullock made his loan permanent and signed an 18-month contract, and David Brown signed after impressing on a trial. Five players also left Valley Parade on loan deals during January, with Craig Bentham joining Farsley Celtic, Luke Medley joining Cambridge City, Sean Taylforth and Luke Morgan both going to Droylsden, and Simon Ainge joining Halifax Town. Goalkeeper Donovan Ricketts was also expected to leave but his transfer to Queens Park Rangers collapsed after the Home Office rejected his application for a work permit.

=== February ===
City's unbeaten run was extended to six games when David Brown scored on his debut to beat Macclesfield Town 1–0. The run came to an end with consecutive 2–1 defeats to Bury and Rochdale. On 20 February 2008, David Wetherall, who had played nearly 300 league games for City since he joined in 1999, announced he would retire at the end of the season. City won their first win in three games when they beat Notts County for the second time in as many months, with a 3–1 win. Three days later City added a second consecutive win by defeating Rotherham United 3–2 in the game which had been postponed in December, with Lee Bullock scoring his first goal for the club. The same day, club chairman Julian Rhodes announced a new season ticket offer in a bid to fill more of the 25,000-seater stadium for the following season by offering free tickets if more than 9,000 adult tickets were bought.

=== March ===
March started with two more consecutive defeats. Dagenham & Redbridge defeated City 2–0 in their first game at Valley Parade, when Barry Conlon missed a penalty and then an open goal both when the score was 1–0. In the following game, Peter Thorne scored a penalty to give City the lead against Stockport County, but County scored twice to win 2–1. Four days later, Bradford recorded their third victory of the season against Chester City, when Conlon scored the only goal of the game in a 1–0 victory. Conlon scored another in the following game but City again were beaten, 2–1 by Mansfield Town. Following Wetherall's announcement that he would retire, City's supporters staged a special day to celebrate his career and contribution to the club, during the away fixture on 22 March 2008 at Rotherham United, where the team had lost 4–1 the previous season during Wetherall's spell as player-manager. The result of the game finished 1–1, during which Omar Daley was sent off. City played a second game two days later, because of the Easter fixture list, when Peter Thorne scored the 150th league goal of his career to help City beat Chesterfield 1–0. The month finished with a 3–1 victory over Darlington, when Tom Penford scored his first goal for the club, and both Barry Conlon and Joe Colbeck scored against their former club. The victory put City into the top half of the table for the first time since September. During March, City also won a Football League award for their season ticket deal at the start of the season.

=== April ===
On 1 April 2008, first City's keeper Donovan Ricketts was blocked from coming back into the country following a Jamaica call-up, before City lost 2–1 at Rochdale, following a late winning goal from Rochdale's Adam Le Fondre. City returned to winnings ways four days later, when Eddie Johnson scored the only goal of a 1–0 victory over Morecambe. Johnson scored for a second successive game, three days later to secure a 1–1 draw with Barnet in a rearranged game at Valley Parade. A second successive draw on 12 April, this time 2–2 against Brentford, meant that City could no longer reach the play-offs, ensuring that they would again be playing in League Two during 2008–09. A late goal from Joe Colbeck on 19 April prevented a third successive draw and gave City a 2–1 victory over Grimsby Town. Colbeck was named the club's player of the season at the annual award ceremony on 23 April, but was sent off in the club's final home of the season against Milton Keynes Dons. Bradford were already 2–0 behind when Colbeck was dismissed, and despite a goal from Omar Daley, they lost 2–1, which crowned Milton Keynes as the league champions.

On 29 April 2008, McCall announced the list of players he would be keeping and releasing at the end of the season. As well as Ricketts, who was unlikely to be given a new work permit, the first team players to be released were Darren Williams, Paul Evans, Tom Penford and Alex Rhodes. Craig Bentham, who had spent three months on loan at Farsley Celtic, and Scott Phelan, who had not featured since December, were also deemed surplus to requirements. Back-up goalkeepers Ben Saynor and Jamie Waite, neither of whom had played a first team league game, and youngsters David Brown, Luke Morgan and Damian Hopkins completed the list of 13 players to leave the club. Barry Conlon and Kyle Nix were the only first team regulars to be offered new contracts, along with juniors Luke Medley, Luke O'Brien and Sean Taylforth.

=== May and June ===
City finished the season with a 2–1 defeat at Wycombe Wanderers, when Luke Medley scored a penalty on his first start for the club. McCall had made a number of changes to the side, after his decision to release 13 players, giving a debut to Sean Taylforth and also giving places to three of the released players. It was also David Wetherall's final game for the club.

In the week after the season had finished, Barry Conlon was the first to sign a new deal keeping him at the club until January 2008, before Kyle Nix and Luke O'Brien signed their season-long contracts. By the end of the week, McCall made his first transfer of the summer when he signed goalkeeper Jonathan McLaughlin from non-league Harrogate Town. It was not until the end of the month that he added his second signing, when midfielder Chris Brandon, a former club trainee, joined from Huddersfield Town on a free transfer. Defender Paul Arnison, who had been released by Carlisle United in May, became the club's third summer transfer, when he signed a two-year contract on 18 June 2008. On 30 June 2008, the final day before City would return to pre-season training, City signed a second defender, when Graeme Lee joined on a free transfer from Doncaster Rovers. He also signed a two-year contract.

== Match results ==
=== Legend ===
Win	Draw	Loss

=== Football League Two ===
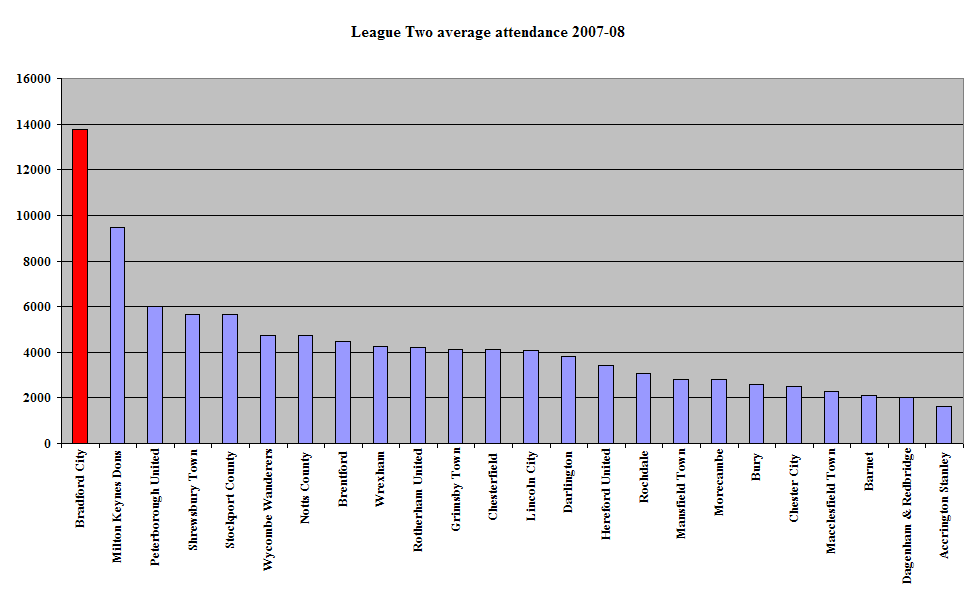
Bradford City recorded the highest average attendance during the 2007–08 Football League Two season.

Game	Date	Opponent	Venue	Result	Attendance	Goalscorers	Notes
1	11 August 2007	Macclesfield Town	Home	1–1	14,345	Ndumbu-Nsungu	
2	18 August 2007	Shrewsbury Town	Away	0–1	6,413		
3	25 August 2007	Wrexham	Home	2–1	13,546	Johnson, Medley	
4	1 September 2007	Barnet	Away	1–2	2,412	Johnson	
5	7 September 2007	Lincoln City	Away	2–1	5,286	Ndumbu-Nsungu, Colbeck	
6	15 September 2007	Peterborough United	Home	1–0	13,819	Bower	
7	22 September 2007	Hereford United	Away	2–4	3,275	Ndumbu-Nsungu (2)	
8	29 September 2007	Wycombe Wanderers	Home	0–1	13,530		
9	2 October 2007	Accrington Stanley	Home	0–3	13,346		
10	6 October 2007	Milton Keynes Dons	Away	1–2	7,903	Conlon (pen)	
11	12 October 2007	Morecambe	Away	1–2	4,761	Bower	
12	20 October 2007	Darlington	Home	0–0	14,074		
13	27 October 2007	Grimsby Town	Away	1–1	4,883	Ndumbu-Nsungu (pen)	
14	3 November 2007	Brentford	Home	1–2	13,326	Bower	
15	6 November 2007	Chester City	Home	2–1	13,211	Daley, Rhodes	
16	17 November 2007	Dagenham & Redbridge	Away	4–1	2,247	Thorne, Wetherall, Law (2)	
17	24 November 2007	Stockport County	Home	1–1	13,837	Ndumbu-Nsungu	
18	5 December 2007	Mansfield Town	Away	0–0	2,308		
19	8 December 2007	Chesterfield	Away	1–1	3,727	Nix	
20	22 December 2007	Peterborough United	Away	1–2	5,355	Nix	
21	26 December 2007	Lincoln City	Home	2–1	15,510	Thorne, Conlon	
22	29 December 2007	Hereford United	Home	1–3	13,640	Wetherall	
23	1 January 2008	Accrington Stanley	Away	2–0	2,898	Clarke, Colbeck	
24	12 January 2008	Notts County	Home	3–0	13,494	Thorne (3)	
25	22 January 2008	Bury	Away	2–2	2,776	Conlon (pen), Nix	
26	26 January 2008	Wrexham	Away	1–1	4,341	Nix	
27	29 January 2008	Shrewsbury Town	Home	4–2	13,269	Nix, Daley, Thorne, Conlon (pen)	
28	2 February 2008	Macclesfield Town	Away	1–0	2,778	Brown	
29	9 February 2008	Bury	Home	1–2	13,844	Thorne	
30	16 February 2008	Rochdale	Home	1–2	14,017	Thorne	
31	23 February 2008	Notts County	Away	3–1	4,717	Thorne, Colbeck, Rhodes	
32	26 February 2008	Rotherham United	Home	3–2	13,436	Daley, Rhodes, Bullock	
33	1 March 2008	Dagenham & Redbridge	Home	0–2	13,537		
34	8 March 2008	Stockport County	Away	1–2	5,763	Thorne (pen)	
35	12 March 2008	Chester City	Away	1–0	1,566	Conlon	
36	15 March 2008	Mansfield Town	Home	1–2	13,611	Conlon	
37	22 March 2008	Rotherham United	Away	1–1	4,157	Colbeck	
38	24 March 2008	Chesterfield	Home	1–0	13,825	Thorne	
39	29 March 2008	Darlington	Away	3–1	4,492	Penford, Conlon, Colbeck	
40	1 April 2008	Rochdale	Away	1–2	3,811	Thorne (pen)	
41	5 April 2008	Morecambe	Home	1–0	13,562	Johnson	
42	8 April 2008	Barnet	Home	1–1	13,072	Johnson	
43	12 April 2008	Brentford	Away	2–2	4,336	Nix, Thorne	
44	19 April 2008	Grimsby Town	Home	2–1	13,448	Colbeck, Thorne	
45	26 April 2008	Milton Keynes Dons	Home	1–2	14,609	Daley	
46	3 May 2008	Wycombe Wanderers	Away	1–2	5,467	Medley (pen)	

=== FA Cup ===
Round	Date	Opponent	Venue	Result	Attendance	Goalscorers	Notes
1	10 November 2007	Chester City	Home	1–0	4,069	Thorne	
2	1 December 2007	Tranmere Rovers	Home	0–3	6,379		

=== League Cup ===
Round	Date	Opponent	Venue	Result	Attendance	Goalscorers	Notes
1	15 August 2007	Wolverhampton Wanderers	Away	1–2	9,625	Nix	

=== Football League Trophy ===
Round	Date	Opponent	Venue	Result	Attendance	Goalscorers	Notes
1	4 September 2007	Doncaster Rovers	Away	1–5	4,710	Nix	

== League table ==
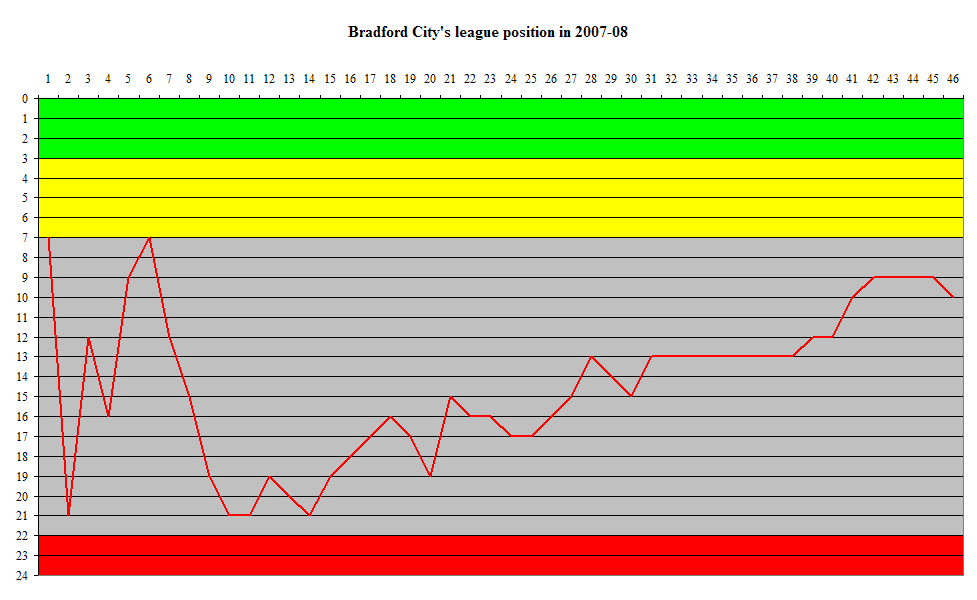
Progress of Bradford City during the 2007–08 Football League Two season

Pos	Team	Pld	W	D	L	GF	GA	GD	Pts
8	Chesterfield	46	19	12	15	76	56	+20	69
9	Rotherham United	46	21	11	14	62	58	+4	64 (Note: Rotherham United deducted 10 points for administration entrance.)
10	Bradford City	46	17	11	18	63	61	+2	62
11	Morecambe	46	16	12	18	59	63	−4	60
12	Barnet	46	16	12	18	56	63	−7	60

Updated to match(es) played on 3 May 2008. Source: The Football League
Rules for classification: 1) points; 2) goal difference; 3) number of goals scored.

== Player details ==
Source: Soccerbase

No.	Pos.	Name	League		FA Cup		League Cup		FL Trophy		Total	
No.	Pos.	Name	Apps	Goals	Apps	Goals	Apps	Goals	Apps	Goals	Apps	Goals
1	GK	(Jamaica) Donovan Ricketts	22	0	2	0	1	0	0	0	25	0
2	DF	(England) Darren Williams	28	0	2	0	1	0	0	0	31	0
3	DF	(England) Paul Heckingbottom	44	0	1	0	1	0	1	0	47	0
4	MF	(Wales) Paul Evans	19 (6)	0	2	0	1	0	0	0	22 (6)	0
5	DF	(England) David Wetherall (c)	46	2	2	0	1	0	0	0	49	2
6	DF	(England) Mark Bower	25 (2)	3	0	0	1	0	0	0	26 (2)	3
7	MF	(Jamaica) Omar Daley	37 (4)	4	2	0	1	0	0	0	40 (4)	4
8	MF	(England) Eddie Johnson	30 (2)	4	1	0	1	0	0	0	32 (2)	4
9	FW	(Republic of Ireland) Barry Conlon	21 (21)	7	0 (2)	0	1	0	1	0	23 (23)	7
10	FW	(England) Peter Thorne	31 (2)	14	2	1	0	0	0 (1)	0	33 (3)	15
11	MF	(England) Alex Rhodes	11 (17)	3	0 (1)	0	0 (1)	0	0	0	11 (19)	4
12	DF	(England) Matthew Clarke	15 (2)	1	2	0	0	0	1	0	18 (2)	1
13	GK	(England) Rhys Evans	4	0	0	0	0	0	0	0	4	0
14	MF	(England) Craig Bentham	0 (3)	0	0	0	0	0	1	0	1 (3)	0
15	MF	(England) Joe Colbeck	27 (6)	6	0	0	1	0	1	0	29 (6)	6
16	DF	(England) Simon Ainge	0 (4)	0	0	0	0	0	1	0	1 (4)	0
17	DF	(England) Thomas Harban	6	0	0	0	0	0	1	0	7	0
18	MF	(England) Tom Penford	13 (2)	1	0 (1)	0	0	0	0	0	13 (3)	1
19	DF	(England) Luke O'Brien	2	0	1	0	0	0	0 (1)	0	3 (1)	0
20	MF	(England) Scott Phelan	8 (5)	0	1 (1)	0	1	0	0	0	10 (6)	0
21	FW	(England) Nathan Joynes	1 (1)	0	0	0	0	0	0 (1)	0	1 (2)	0
22	MF	(England) Kyle Nix	31 (9)	6	2	0	1	1	1	1	35 (9)	8
23	FW	(Chile) Willy Topp	6 (5)	0	0	0	0	0	0	0	6 (5)	0
24	FW	(Democratic Republic of the Congo) Guylain Ndumbu-Nsungu	17 (1)	6	2	0	0 (1)	0	0	0	19 (2)	6
25	FW	(England) Luke Medley	1 (8)	2	0	0	0	0	0	0	1 (8)	2
26	MF	(England) Nicky Law	10	2	0	0	0	0	0	0	10	2
28	FW	(England) Sean Taylforth	1	0	0 (1)	0	0	0	1	0	2 (1)	0
30	GK	(England) Ben Saynor	0	0	0	0	0	0	1	0	1	0
32	MF	(England) Lee Bullock	12	1	0	0	0	0	0	0	12	1
33	DF	(Poland) Ben Starosta	12 (3)	0	0	0	0	0	0	0	12 (3)	0
34	GK	(England) Scott Loach	20	0	0	0	0	0	0	0	20	0
35	DF	(England) TJ Moncur	6 (1)	0	0	0	0	0	0	0	6 (1)	0
36	FW	(England) David Brown	0 (5)	1	0	0	0	0	0	0	0 (5)	1

== Transfers ==
=== In ===
Date	Pos	Name	From	Fee	Notes
2 July 2007	FW	Barry Conlon	Mansfield Town	Free	
2 July 2007	FW	Peter Thorne	Norwich City	Free	
24 July 2007	MF	Scott Phelan	Everton	Free	
27 July 2007	MF	Kyle Nix	Parkgate	Free	
27 July 2007	MF	Darren Williams	Hartlepool United	Free	
1 August 2007	MF	Paul Evans	Swindon Town	Free	
9 August 2007	MF	Alex Rhodes	Brentford	Free	
21 November 2007	GK	Jamie Waite	St Albans City	Free	
11 December 2007	FW	Willy Topp	Universidad Católica	£35,000	
8 January 2008	DF	Paul Heckingbottom	Barnsley	Free	
31 January 2008	FW	David Brown	Nottingham Forest	Free	
31 January 2008	MF	Lee Bullock	Hartlepool United	Free	
9 May 2008	GK	Jonathan McLaughlin	Harrogate Town	Free	
30 May 2008	MF	Chris Brandon	Huddersfield Town	Free	
18 June 2008	DF	Paul Arnison	Carlisle United	Free	
30 June 2008	DF	Graeme Lee	Doncaster Rovers	Free	

=== Out ===
Date	Pos	Name	To	Fee	Notes
7 February 2008	GK	Sam Filler	Middlesbrough	Undisclosed	
End of season	MF	Craig Bentham	Farsley Celtic	Released	
End of season	FW	David Brown	Guiseley	Released	
End of season	MF	Paul Evans	Oxford United	Released	
End of season	DF	Damian Hopkins		Released	
End of season	MF	Eddie Johnson	Chester City	Released	
End of season	FW	Luke Medley	Barnet	£7,500	
End of season	MF	Luke Morgan		Released	
End of season	MF	Tom Penford	Farsley Celtic	Released	
End of season	MF	Scott Phelan	FC Halifax Town	Released	
End of season	GK	Donovan Ricketts	Village United	Released	
End of season	MF	Alex Rhodes	Rotherham United	Released	
End of season	GK	Ben Saynor	Farsley Celtic	Released	
End of season	GK	Jamie Waite	Doncaster Rovers	Released	
End of season	DF	Darren Williams	Dundee	Released	

=== Loans in ===
Date	Pos	Name	From	End date	Notes
16 July 2007	DF	Paul Heckingbottom	Barnsley	1 January 2008	
25 July 2007	DF	Thomas Harban	Barnsley	1 January 2008	
27 July 2007	DF	Nathan Joynes	Barnsley	1 January 2008	
9 August 2007	FW	Guylain Ndumbu-Nsungu	Gillingham	31 December 2007	
5 October 2007	MF	Nicky Law	Sheffield United	21 December 2007	
5 October 2007	GK	Rhys Evans	Blackpool	30 October 2007	
1 January 2008	MF	Lee Bullock	Hartlepool United	31 January 2008	
21 January 2008	DF	Ben Starosta	Sheffield United	End of season	
28 January 2008	GK	Scott Loach	Watford	End of season	
30 January 2008	DF	TJ Moncur	Fulham	8 April 2008	

=== Loans out ===
Date	Pos	Name	To	End date	Notes
24 October 2007	MF	Joe Colbeck	Darlington	8 December 2007	
	DF	Damian Hopkins	Ossett Albion		
	MF	Luke Morgan	Ossett Albion		
4 January 2008	MF	Craig Bentham	Farsley Celtic	5 April 2008	
11 January 2008	FW	Luke Medley	Cambridge City	10 February 2008	
11 January 2008	FW	Sean Taylforth	Droylsden	10 February 2008	
11 January 2008	MF	Luke Morgan	Droylsden	10 February 2008	
31 January 2008	DF	Simon Ainge	Halifax Town		
14 March 2008	FW	Sean Taylforth	Guiseley		
	GK	Jamie Waite	Droylsden		

== See also ==
- 2007–08 in English football
