= 2008–09 Bradford City A.F.C. season =

Bradford City
2008–09 season
- Chairman: Mark Lawn; Julian Rhodes
- Manager: Stuart McCall
- FA Cup: Second round
- League Cup: First round
- Football League Trophy: First round
- Top goalscorer: League: Peter Thorne (17); All: Peter Thorne (17)
- Highest home attendance: 14,038 vs Notts County (9 August 2008)
- Lowest home attendance: 5,065 vs Leyton Orient (29 November 2008)
Home colours	Away colours

The 2008–09 season was the 106th season in Bradford City A.F.C.'s history, their 94th in The Football League and 96th in the league system of English football. Their 10th-place finish in 2007–08 meant it would be their second successive season in League Two.

This article covers a period from 1 July 2008 to 30 June 2009.

== Background ==
Stuart McCall had been appointed Bradford City's new manager ahead of the club's 2007–08 League Two campaign. He had targeted promotion during his first season, but the club were in the bottom half of the league until after the New Year and could only finish tenth, 16 points outside the play-off spots. McCall released 13 players at the end of the season, and also lost his captain, David Wetherall, who decided to retire, and Luke Medley, who turned down a new contract in favour of a return to his home in London. McCall added four new signings: keeper Jonathan McLaughlin, midfielder Chris Brandon, Paul Arnison and defender Graeme Lee during June as he attempted to build a team to win promotion.

== Review ==
=== Pre-season ===
City returned to pre-season training on 1 July 2008 with a fifth new player, after Tranmere midfielder Paul McLaren signed a two-year deal. Two weeks after pre-season training started, City played their first friendly when they lost 3–1 to Farsley Celtic, the only City goal coming from a Barry Conlon penalty. City's side included several trialists, including goalkeeper Nick Colgan, Korey Nix (brother of City midfielder Kyle) and Rory Boulding. Rory's elder brother Michael, who had also been training with City, was unable to play because of an injury. The second pre-season came three days later, when City defeated Bradford rivals Bradford Park Avenue 3–1, selecting a squad which included a number of youth team players. City's third friendly was a 2–1 defeat by another West Yorkshire non-league side, Guiseley, who featured former Bradford player David Brown on trial. City embarked on a short tour of Scotland, where they defeated Dundee 1–0 but lost 4–0 to Motherwell. During the tour, the club signed brothers Michael and Rory Boulding on free transfers. Upon their return to England, City lost their next friendly 2–1 to Burnley. Following his form in several trial games, including a string of saves against Burnley, goalkeeper Rhys Evans, who had played on loan the previous season with City, became City's latest signing on 1 August 2008. Three days later, City's next friendly resulted in a 1–0 victory against League One side Oldham Athletic. The final pre-season friendly was played behind closed doors, when City lost 2–0 to Sheffield Wednesday with a team made up of juniors and reserve players. A day before the start of the season, McCall signed defender TJ Moncur on loan from Fulham as cover at right back. The agreement gave Bradford the option to sign Moncur, who had also played seven games on loan the previous season, on a permanent contract once the loan finished on 3 January 2009.

=== August ===
City started the season with a 2–1 victory at home to Notts County. Striker Peter Thorne, who had been Bradford's top goalscorer in the 2007–08 season and scored a hat-trick in the corresponding fixture, scored both Bradford's goals. City again lost at the first round stage of the League Cup for the third successive season, this time 4–0 to West Yorkshire rivals Huddersfield Town. Thorne, who had been rested to the substitutes' bench for the defeat at Huddersfield, returned for City's second league game when he scored both goals in a 2–0 victory at Macclesfield Town. City maintained their unbeaten start to the season with a 2–0 victory against Rochdale on 23 August 2008. It was the first time since the 2001–02 season that City had won their first three games of the season. Michael Boulding opened the scoring with his first City goal before Thorne added his fifth of the campaign. McCall stated he wanted to sign one more player before the August transfer deadline, before bringing in South African midfielder Dean Furman from his former side Rangers on loan until January. City's winning start to the league season came to an end with a defeat by Aldershot Town—the first time the two sides had met. City had taken the lead with Paul McLaren's first goal for the club, but Peter Thorne missed a penalty as City lost 3–2.

=== September ===
City suffered a second successive defeat when they were knocked out of another cup by a rival West Yorkshire side from League One. This time it was Leeds United, who won 2–1, in the Football League Trophy in front of 20,128 fans—one of the highest crowds for the tournament. Barry Conlon scored City's goal. After two successive defeats, City returned to winning ways by defeating Port Vale 2–0 on 6 September, with goals from Bullock and Thorne. The game marked the first contest between managers Stuart McCall and Lee Sinnott since McCall was appointed City manager in May 2007, when Sinnott was also in line for the job following his form at Farsley Celtic. Thorne scored another two, as did Michael Boulding, when City added their fifth win from six league games with a 4–1 victory over Exeter City (despite being 1–0 behind at half-time) to go top of the league. City lost their unbeaten home start to the season the following week when they lost 3–1 to Bournemouth, managed by former City player Jimmy Quinn. Joe Colbeck scored City's goal, his first of the season. City suffered a second successive defeat a week later against another promotion favourite, Shrewsbury Town, 2–0. The game was marred by an injury to TJ Moncur, who collapsed after less than ten minutes after a clash of heads with Graeme Lee and had to be taken to hospital.

=== October ===
City went a third game without victory with a 1–1 draw with Luton Town. City had been reduced to ten men when Paul Heckingbottom was sent off, but just four minutes later Barry Conlon, who had come on as a substitute only a minute earlier, gave City the lead, only for Luton to equalise seven minutes later. City recorded their first victory in four games by defeating Accrington Stanley on 11 October, despite trailing by two goals with ten minutes to go. Goals by Conlon, Michael Boulding and Thorne gave City a 3–2 victory. The roles were reversed a week later when City led Gillingham 2–0 at half-time with goals from Thorne and Colbeck; but, despite Gillingham being reduced to ten men when Mark Bentley was sent off, the game finished 2–2. Only two days later, City again fell to a late goal when they lost to Darlington 2–1, with Omar Daley scoring his first goal of the season. After recording just one victory in six matches, McCall said he wanted to bring in some loan transfers and signed Tom Clarke from Huddersfield on 23 October. He made his debut the following day as a first-half substitute against Grimsby Town after fellow defender Matthew Clarke was sent off. City were leading 1–0 at the time through an Omar Daley, and, despite being reduced to ten men, extended their advantage through former Grimsby striker Michael Boulding and a first club goal for Graeme Lee, eventually winning 3–1. Colbeck was injured during the victory over Grimsby, and so McCall signed midfielder Nicky Law, who had played ten games for City the previous season, as cover on another loan deal. The month ended with a 1–0 against fellow promotion hopefuls Bury, with Barry Conlon again coming on as substitute to score the only goal of the game.

=== November ===
At the start of November, City extended their unbeaten run to three games, but were unable to defeat Barnet despite being ahead three times. Barry Conlon scored two of the goals in just his fourth league start of the season, with Peter Thorne scoring City's other goal in a 3–3 draw. The first round of the FA Cup saw City drawn against Milton Keynes Dons, who had won promotion to League One the previous season. However, City pulled off an upset with a 2–1 victory at stadium:mk with goals from Daley and Lee. The following week's return to league action saw City against Wycombe Wanderers, who were second in the league and had the only remaining undefeated league record in the country. A second half goal from Lewis Hunt gave Wycombe a 1–0 victory. Full back Luke O'Brien scored his first senior goal in City's next league game as City defeated Rotherham United 2–0 in their first game at the Don Valley Stadium, Rotherham's temporary home. Nicky Law's first goal of his second spell completed the scoring. A second half penalty from Conlon three days later against Chesterfield gave City back-to-back victories and their second 3–2 of the season after being 2–0 down. First half goals from Graeme Lee and Michael Boulding had started the comeback in the first half before Chesterfield were reduced to ten men when Alan Goodall was sent off for committing the foul which led to Conlon's penalty. Winger Omar Daley was injured in the game, becoming the latest midfielder to be sidelined. As a result, McCall brought into another loan transfer two days later by signing Steve Jones from Burnley for one month. Jones made his debut the following weekend as City lost 2–1 in the FA Cup second round to League One's Leyton Orient.

=== December ===
At the start of December, Chilean striker Willy Topp was released from his contract six months early to let him find a new club. He played only two games during the 2008–09 season, both as substitute. The following day, Tom Clarke followed him out of the club, after he was recalled from his loan spell by Huddersfield caretaker manager Gerry Murphy. The first game of the month saw City extend their unbeaten run to three games with a 1–1 draw against Dagenham & Redbridge, in a game in which opposition manager John Still said they had dominated. City's unbeaten run was ended at Brentford the following week in a 2–1 defeat, with all three goals coming in the final two minutes. City's goal came from Michael Boulding, who scored for the third successive game. City failed to win for a third successive game when they drew 0–0 with Chester City. Another 0–0 draw followed as City's run without victory extended to four games in the first game of the festive period at Lincoln City. Bradford ended their run of four games without a victory by defeating Morecambe 4–0 in the final game of the season to return to the automatic promotion spots.

=== January ===
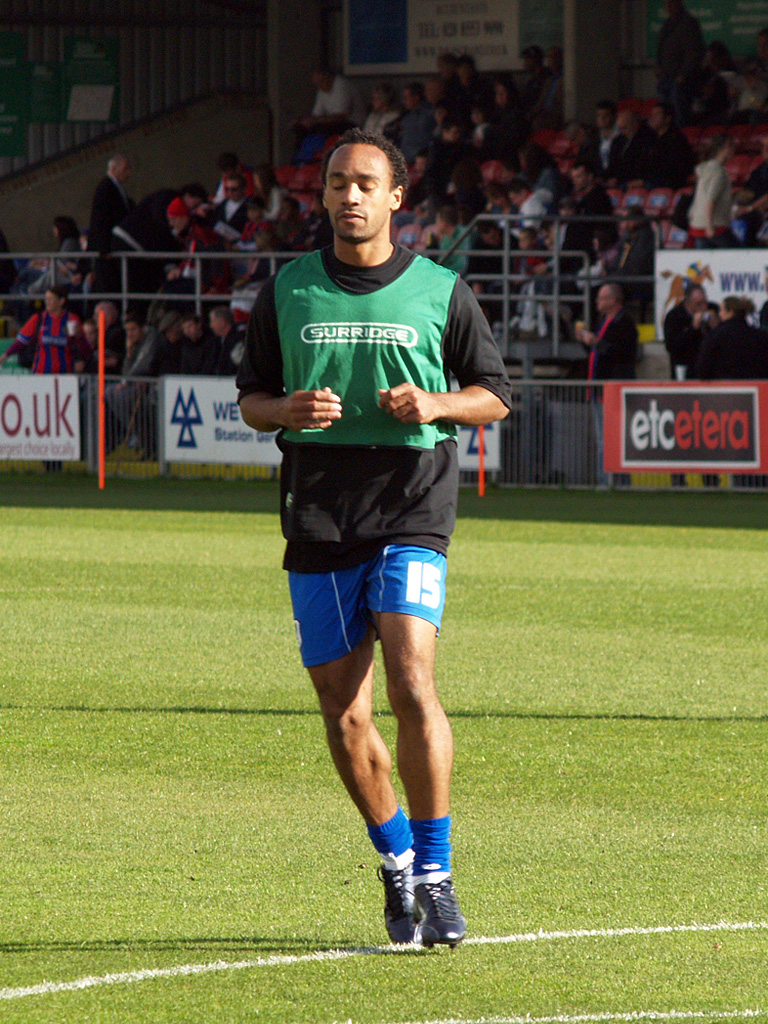
Striker Chris O'Grady joined on loan from Oldham Athletic in January

At the start of the New Year, TJ Moncur's loan spell was cancelled and he returned to Fulham. The following day, City brought in another player on loan, with Chris O'Grady signing from Oldham Athletic for one month. City kept their fourth successive clean sheet the following day in the first game of 2009, but were again involved in a goalless draw, this time with fellow promotion-chasing side Shrewsbury Town. City's activity in the loan market continued, with Nicky Law extending his loan until the end of the season, while midfielder Luke Sharry was loaned out to Conference National side Barrow. Furman also extended his loan to the end of the season and Jones for another month.

City's next scheduled game was postponed because of a frozen pitch, before they extended their unbeaten run to five games the following week with their fourth draw during that run. A second half goal from Conlon gave City a 1–1 draw with Accrington Stanley. The run was extended to three successive draws against Luton Town, although City were losing 2–0 at half-time before they recovered to 2–2. A late goal from Luton's Asa Hall looked to have given Luton the win, before Conlon scored for a second successive game, this time from a penalty, to give City a 3–3 draw.

Two days after the game, City again moved into the loan market by taking Pakistani international defender Zesh Rehman for the rest of the season from Championship side QPR. Leaving the club on loan was another central defender, Mark Bower, who was signed by Luton Town for one month to cover injuries and suspensions. Rehman was given his debut the following day as City's run without defeat came to an end with a 1–0 loss to top three side Bury to drop out of the top seven for the first time in the season. However, City made amends in their final game of the month by recording their first victory of the calendar year, 2–0 against a Grimsby side which had been reduced to ten men. City's goals came from loan players Law and Jones, whose goal was his first for the club.

=== February ===
The January transfer window closed two days later than traditionally, with City extending Jones' loan until the end of the season but deciding to allow O'Grady to return to Oldham. City had been due to play Darlington live on television the same day, but the game was postponed because of snow. When City returned to action, they recorded their first back-to-back victories since November with a 2–0 victory against fellow promotion-chasing Gillingham. It was followed up by a third successive victory without conceding, with a 1–0 victory against second placed Wycombe a week later. Jones scored for the second successive home game. The sequence of wins came to an end with the rearranged game with Darlington, which ended in a 0–0 draw. City's four games without defeat or conceding came to an end with a 4–1 defeat by Barnet, who were third from bottom in the table and without a home win in four months. It was followed up by another away defeat, this time 3–1 at Notts County, which saw City drop out of the play-off spots.

=== March ===
City ended their three-run game without a defeat and returned to the play-off spots three days later by defeating Macclesfield Town 1–0 with a goal from Dean Furman. Four days later, City recorded their highest victory of the season with a 5–0 victory against Aldershot Town. Peter Thorne scored two goals, with Dean Furman, Barry Conlon and a last minute own goal completing City's scoring. When City returned to the road three days later, they recorded a third consecutive away defeat, this time 3–0 to fellow promotion-contenders Rochdale, with all three goals coming in the second half. The following day, Northern Ireland international winger Keith Gillespie joined City for the rest of the season after he impressed Stuart McCall during two weeks training with the club. After another defeat, the fourth successive away from home, this time 1–0 to another side chasing promotion, Exeter City, Bradford once again dropped out of the play-off places. Conlon and Clarke were disciplined by the club and missed the game with Exeter because of a non-footballing matter. When City suffered their fifth successive away defeat, this time 4–1 to Bournemouth, only three days later, Stuart McCall threatened to resign if the side missed out on a play-off place.

Although Conlon played in the defeat by Bournemouth, he was sent on loan to Grimsby at the end of the week, with fellow striker Paul Mullin arriving as his replacement from Accrington Stanley on a similar deal to the end of the season. The following day, a 1–0 defeat by Port Vale was City's fourth loss in 11 games. McCall opted not to bring in any more new players by the transfer deadline, but defender Simon Ainge was allowed to move on loan to Cambridge United. City's run without a victory was extended to five with a goalless draw away at Chester, who had themselves not won in their previous 17 games.

=== April ===
City started April by extending their number of games without a win to six with a 1–1 draw at home with league leaders Brentford. City's goal came in the final minute from Peter Thorne to rescue one point. Despite taking the lead in their subsequent game through Matt Clarke's header, City's run of form continued with a 2–1 defeat by Morecambe. City also had a goal from Thorne ruled out which would have given them a 2–0 lead.

== Match results ==
=== Legend ===
Win	Draw	Loss

=== Football League Two ===
Game	Date	Opponent	Venue	Result	Attendance	Goalscorers	Notes
1	9 August 2008	Notts County	Home	2–1	14,038	Thorne (2)	
2	16 August 2008	Macclesfield Town	Away	2–0	2,556	Thorne (2)	
3	23 August 2008	Rochdale	Home	2–0	13,154	M. Boulding, Thorne	
4	30 August 2008	Aldershot Town	Away	2–3	3,805	Bullock, McLaren	
5	6 September 2008	Port Vale	Away	2–0	7,273	Bullock, Thorne	
6	13 September 2008	Exeter City	Home	4–1	12,683	M. Boulding (2), Thorne (2)	
7	20 September 2008	Bournemouth	Home	1–3	12,824	Colbeck	
8	27 September 2008	Shrewsbury Town	Away	0–2	6,517		
9	4 October 2008	Luton Town	Home	1–1	13,083	Conlon	
10	11 October 2008	Accrington Stanley	Away	3–2	3,012	M. Boulding, Conlon, Thorne	
11	18 October 2008	Gillingham	Home	2–2	12,432	Colbeck, Thorne	
12	21 October 2008	Darlington	Away	1–2	3,034	Daley	
13	24 October 2008	Grimsby Town	Away	3–1	4,470	M. Boulding, Daley, Lee	
14	28 October 2008	Bury	Home	1–0	12,830	Conlon	
15	1 November 2008	Barnet	Home	3–3	12,510	Conlon (2), Thorne	
16	15 November 2008	Wycombe Wanderers	Away	0–1	5,002		
17	22 November 2008	Rotherham United	Away	2–0	4,586	Law, O'Brien	
18	25 November 2008	Chesterfield	Home	3–2	12,145	M. Boulding, Conlon (pen), Lee	
19	6 December 2008	Dagenham & Redbridge	Home	1–1	12,145	M. Boulding	
20	13 December 2008	Brentford	Away	1–2	4,339	M. Boulding	
21	20 December 2008	Chester City	Home	0–0	12,092		
22	26 December 2008	Lincoln City	Away	0–0	6,156		
23	28 December 2008	Morecambe	Home	4–0	13,105	M. Boulding, Conlon (pen), Law, McLaren	
24	3 January 2009	Shrewsbury Town	Home	0–0	12,877		
25	17 January 2009	Accrington Stanley	Home	1–1	12,172	Conlon	
26	24 January 2009	Luton Town	Away	3–3	6,053	Conlon (pen), Furman, McLaren	
27	27 January 2009	Bury	Away	0–1	4,112		
28	31 January 2009	Grimsby Town	Home	2–0	12,816	Jones, Law	
29	7 February 2009	Gillingham	Away	2–0	4,866	M. Boulding, Daley	
30	14 February 2009	Wycombe Wanderers	Home	1–0	12,689	Jones	
31	17 February 2009	Darlington	Home	0–0	12,782		
32	21 February 2009	Barnet	Away	1–4	2,445	M. Boulding	
33	28 February 2009	Notts County	Away	1–3	5,138	Thorne	
34	3 March 2009	Macclesfield Town	Home	1–0	11,908	Furman	
35	7 March 2009	Aldershot Town	Home	5–0	12,465	Conlon, Furman, Thorne (2), own goal	
36	10 March 2009	Rochdale	Away	0–3	5,157		
37	14 March 2009	Exeter City	Away	0–1	5,253		
38	17 March 2009	Bournemouth	Away	1–4	4,847	M. Clarke	
39	21 March 2009	Port Vale	Home	0–1	12,436		
40	28 March 2009	Chester City	Away	0–0	2,735		
41	4 April 2009	Brentford	Home	1–1	12,832	Thorne	
42	10 April 2009	Morecambe	Away	1–2	4,546	M. Clarke	
43	13 April 2009	Lincoln City	Home	1–1	12,932	Bullock	
44							
45							
46							

=== FA Cup ===
Round	Date	Opponent	Venue	Result	Attendance	Goalscorers	Notes
1	8 November 2008	Milton Keynes Dons	Away	2–1	5,542	Daley, Lee	
2	29 November 2008	Leyton Orient	Home	1–2	5,065	M. Boulding	

=== League Cup ===
Round	Date	Opponent	Venue	Result	Attendance	Goalscorers	Notes
1	12 August 2008	Huddersfield Town	Away	0–4	8,932		

=== Football League Trophy ===
Round	Date	Opponent	Venue	Result	Attendance	Goalscorers	Notes
1	2 September 2008	Leeds United	Away	1–2	20,128	Conlon	

== Player details ==
Updated to 11 April 2009.

No.	Pos.	Name	League		FA Cup		League Cup		FL Trophy		Total	
No.	Pos.	Name	Apps	Goals	Apps	Goals	Apps	Goals	Apps	Goals	Apps	Goals
1	GK	(England) Rhys Evans	42	0	2	0	1	0	1	0	46	0
2	DF	(England) Paul Arnison	22 (1)	0	0	0	1	0	0	0	23 (1)	0
3	DF	(England) Paul Heckingbottom	9	0	0 (1)	0	1	0	1	0	11 (1)	0
4	MF	(England) Paul McLaren	30 (1)	3	1	0	1	0	1	0	33 (1)	3
5	DF	(England) Graeme Lee	41	1	2	1	1	0	1	0	45	3
6	DF	(England) Mark Bower	0 (1)	0	0	0	0	0	1	0	1 (1)	0
7	MF	(Jamaica) Omar Daley	26 (2)	3	1	1	1	0	1	0	29 (2)	4
8	MF	(England) Lee Bullock	11 (8)	2	0	0	1	0	0 (1)	0	12 (9)	2
9	FW	(Republic of Ireland) Barry Conlon	15 (15)	10	2	0	1	0	1	1	19 (15)	11
10	FW	(England) Peter Thorne	29 (5)	15	0 (1)	0	0 (1)	0	0	0	29 (7)	15
11	MF	(England) Chris Brandon	3 (3)	0	0	0	0	0	0	0	3 (3)	0
12	DF	(England) Matthew Clarke	39	2	2	0	1	0	0	0	42	2
13	GK	(England) Jonathan McLaughlin	0	0	0	0	0	0	0	0	0	0
14	FW	(England) Michael Boulding	33 (8)	11	2	1	1	0	0 (1)	0	36 (9)	12
15	MF	(England) Joe Colbeck	17 (8)	2	0	0	0	0	1	0	18 (8)	2
16	DF	(England) Simon Ainge	1	0	0	0	0	0	0	0	1	0
17	FW	(Chile) Willy Topp	0 (2)	0	0	0	0	0	0	0	0 (2)	0
18	FW	(England) Rory Boulding	0	0	0	0	0	0	0	0	0	0
19	DF	(England) Luke O'Brien	30 (1)	1	2	0	0	0	0	0	32 (1)	1
20	DF	(England) TJ Moncur	11 (3)	0	2	0	0 (1)	0	1	0	14 (4)	0
21	DF	(England) Tom Clarke	4 (2)	0	1	0	0	0	0	0	5 (2)	0
22	MF	(England) Kyle Nix	5 (9)	0	1	0	1	0	1	0	8 (9)	0
23	MF	(South Africa) Dean Furman	24 (6)	3	0	0	0	0	1	0	25 (6)	3
24	MF	(England) Nicky Law	28 (1)	3	2	0	0	0	0	0	30 (1)	3
25	MF	(Northern Ireland) Steve Jones	22 (2)	2	1	0	0	0	0	0	23 (2)	2
26	MF	(England) Luke Sharry	0	0	0	0	0	0	0	0	0	0
27	FW	(England) Leon Osborne	1	0	1 (1)	0	0	0	0	0	2 (1)	0
28	FW	(England) Sean Taylforth	0	0	0	0	0 (1)	0	0	0	0 (1)	0
29	DF	(England) Adrian Bellamy	0	0	0	0	0	0	0	0	0	0
30	GK	(England) Matthew Convey	0	0	0	0	0	0	0	0	0	0
32	FW	(England) Chris O'Grady	0 (2)	0	0	0	0	0	0	0	0 (2)	0
33	DF	(Pakistan) Zesh Rehman	13 (1)	0	0	0	0	0	0	0	13 (1)	0
34	MF	(Northern Ireland) Keith Gillespie	2 (1)	0	0	0	0	0	0	0	2 (1)	0
35	FW	(England) Paul Mullin	4	0	0	0	0	0	0	0	4	0
		own goals	–	1	–	0	–	0	–	0	–	1

== Transfers ==
=== In ===
Date	Pos	Name	From	Fee	Notes
1 July 2008	MF	(England) Paul McLaren	(England) Tranmere Rovers	Free	
24 July 2008	FW	(England) Michael Boulding	(England) Mansfield Town	Free	
24 July 2008	FW	(England) Rory Boulding	(England) Mansfield Town	Tribunal	
1 August 2008	GK	(England) Rhys Evans	(England) Millwall	Free	
11 March 2009	MF	(Northern Ireland) Keith Gillespie	(England) Sheffield United	Free	

=== Out ===
Date	Pos	Name	To	Fee	Notes
2 December 2008	FW	(Chile) Willy Topp		Released	

=== Loans in ===
Date	Pos	Name	From	End date	Notes
8 August 2008	DF	(England) TJ Moncur	(England) Fulham	1 January 2009	
27 August 2008	MF	(South Africa) Dean Furman	(Scotland) Rangers		
23 October 2008	DF	(England) Tom Clarke	(England) Huddersfield Town	3 December 2008	
27 October 2008	MF	(England) Nicky Law	(England) Sheffield United		
27 November 2008	MF	(Northern Ireland) Steve Jones	(England) Burnley		
2 January 2009	FW	(England) Chris O'Grady	(England) Oldham Athletic	2 February 2009	
26 January 2009	DF	(Pakistan) Zesh Rehman	(England) Queens Park Rangers		
20 March 2009	FW	(England) Paul Mullin	(England) Accrington Stanley		

=== Loans out ===
Date	Pos	Name	To	End date	Notes
27 August 2008	DF	(England) Adrian Bellamy	(England) Salford City		
7 October 2008	MF	(England) Sean Taylforth	(England) Guiseley		
6 January 2009	MF	(England) Luke Sharry	(England) Barrow	24 February 2009	
26 January 2009	DF	(England) Mark Bower	(England) Luton Town		
	MF	(England) Louis Horne	(England) Barrow	24 February 2009	
	GK	(England) Matthew Convey	(England) Salford City		
20 March 2009	FW	(England) Barry Conlon	(England) Grimsby Town		
26 March 2009	DF	(England) Simon Ainge	(England) Cambridge United		

== See also ==
- 2008–09 in English football
- The Football League 2008–09
