= 2006–07 Bradford City A.F.C. season =

Bradford City
2006–07 season
- Chairman: Julian Rhodes
- Manager: Colin Todd (to 12 February 2007); David Wetherall (from 12 February 2007)
- League One: 22nd (relegated)
- FA Cup: Second round
- League Cup: First round
- Football League Trophy: First round
- Top goalscorer: League: Dean Windass (11); All: Dean Windass (12)
- Highest home attendance: 14,925 (v Huddersfield Town, 7 October 2006)
- Lowest home attendance: 7,134 (v Millwall, 5 May 2007); 1,936 (v Scunthorpe United, Football League Trophy, 17 October 2006)
Home colours

The 2006–07 season was the 104th season in Bradford City A.F.C.'s history, their 92nd in the Football League and 94th in the league system of English football.

== League table ==
Pos	Team	Pld	W	D	L	GF	GA	GD	Pts	Promotion, qualification or relegation
20	Leyton Orient	46	12	15	19	61	77	−16	51	
21	Chesterfield (R)	46	12	11	23	45	53	−8	47	Relegation to Football League Two
22	Bradford City (R)	46	11	14	21	47	65	−18	47	Relegation to Football League Two
23	Rotherham United (R)	46	13	9	24	58	75	−17	38 (Note: Rotherham United had 10 points deducted for entering financial administration.)	Relegation to Football League Two
24	Brentford (R)	46	8	13	25	40	79	−39	37	Relegation to Football League Two

Rules for classification: In the Football League goals scored (GF) takes precedence over goal difference (GD).
(R) Relegated

== Match results ==
=== Legend ===
Win	Draw	Loss

== Player details ==
No.	Pos.	Name	League		FA Cup		League Cup		FL Trophy		Total		Discipline	
No.	Pos.	Name	Apps	Goals	Apps	Goals	Apps	Goals	Apps	Goals	Apps	Goals	Yellow card	Red card
1	GK	(Jamaica) Donovan Ricketts	46	0	3	0	1	0	0	0	50	0	0	0
2	DF	(England) Richard Edghill	20 (4)	0	0	0	0	0	1	0	21 (4)	0	0	0
3	DF	(England) Ben Parker	35 (4)	0	1	0	0	0	1	0	37 (4)	0	0	0
4	DF	(England) Nathan Doyle	25 (3)	0	3	0	1	0	1	0	30 (3)	0	0	0
5	DF	(England) David Wetherall	41	1	3	0	1	0	0	0	45	1	0	0
6	DF	(England) Mark Bower	46	3	3	0	1	0	0	0	50	3	0	0
7	MF	(England) Steven Schumacher	44	6	3	1	1	0	1	0	49	7	0	0
8	MF	(England) Marc Bridge-Wilkinson	39	4	3	1	1	0	0	0	43	4	0	0
9	FW	(England) Eddie Johnson	17 (15)	3	3	0	1	1	1	0	22 (15)	4	0	0
10	FW	(England) Dean Windass	25	11	2	1	1	0	0	0	28	12	0	0
11	MF	(England) Lee Holmes	16	0	1	0	1	0	1	0	19	0	0	0
12	MF	(Jamaica) Jermaine Johnson	26 (1)	4	3	0	1	0	0	0	30 (1)	4	0	0
13	GK	(England) Russell Howarth	0	0	0	0	0	0	1	0	1	0	0	0
15	MF	(England) Ben Muirhead	1 (3)	0	0 (1)	0	0	0	0	0	1 (4)	0	0	0
16	FW	(England) David Graham	17 (5)	3	0	0	0	0	1	0	18 (5)	3	0	0
17	DF	(England) Alan Rogers	4 (4)	0	0	0	1	0	1	0	6 (4)	0	0	0
18	MF	(England) Tom Penford	1 (2)	0	0	0	0	0	0	0	1 (2)	0	0	0
19	MF	(Republic of Ireland) Colin Healy	2	0	2	0	0	0	0	0	4	0	0	0
20	DF	(England) Matthew Clarke	5 (3)	0	0 (1)	0	0	0	1	0	6 (4)	0	0	0
21	MF	(England) Tommy Black	4	0	1 (1)	0	0	0	0	0	5 (1)	0	0	0
22	MF	(England) Carlos Logan	3 (1)	0	0	0	0	0	0	0	3 (1)	0	0	0
23	MF	(Jamaica) Omar Daley	13 (1)	2	0	0	0	0	0	0	13 (1)	2	0	0
24	FW	(England) Dave Hibbert	4 (4)	0	0	0	0	0	0	0	4 (4)	0	0	0
25	MF	(England) Craig Bentham	12 (6)	0	0 (2)	0	0	0	0	0	12 (8)	0	0	0
26	DF	(England) John Swift	1 (1)	0	0	0	0	0	0	0	1 (1)	0	0	0
27	FW	(England) Joe Brown	1 (5)	0	0	0	0	0	0 (1)	1	1 (6)	1	0	0
28	MF	(England) Joe Colbeck	14 (18)	0	0 (1)	0	0	0	1	0	15 (19)	0	0	0
31	MF	(England) Patrick McGuire	0	0	0 (1)	0	0	0	0 (1)	0	0 (2)	0	0	0
32	DF	(England) Simon Ainge	5 (4)	0	2	0	0	0	0 (1)	0	7 (5)	0	0	0
34	FW	(England) Billy Paynter	15	4	0	0	0	0	0	0	15	4	0	0
35	FW	(England) Bruce Dyer	2 (3)	1	0	0	0	0	0	0	2 (3)	1	0	0
36	DF	(Central African Republic) Kelly Youga	11	0	0	0	0	0	0	0	11	0	0	0
37	MF	(France) Xavier Barrau	1 (2)	2	0	0	0	0	0	0	1 (2)	2	0	0
38	FW	(Antigua and Barbuda) Moses Ashikodi	8	2	0	0	0	0	0	0	8	2	0	0
39	FW	(England) Spencer Weir-Daley	2 (3)	1	0	0	0	0	0	0	2 (3)	1	0	0
40	FW	(England) Leon Osborne	0 (1)	0	0	0	0	0	0	0	0 (1)	0	0	0

== See also ==
- 2006–07 in English football
- The Football League 2006–07
