= Taylforth =

Taylforth is a surname. Notable people with the surname include:

- Colin Taylforth (born 1953), English pair skater
- George Taylforth (born 1941), English-Australian rugby league player
- Gillian Taylforth (born 1955), English actress
- Kim Taylforth (born 1958), English actress
- Sean Taylforth (born 1989), English footballer
