= Kyle Nix =

Australian association football player, born 1986

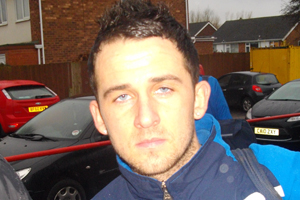
- Nix in 2011

Personal information
- Full name: Kyle Ashley Nix
- Date of birth: 21 January 1986 (age 40)
- Place of birth: Sydney, Australia
- Height: 1.68 m (5 ft 6 in)
- Position: Midfielder

Youth career
- 2000–2002: Manchester United
- 2002–2005: Aston Villa

Senior career*
Years	Team	Apps	(Gls)
2005–2006	Sheffield United	0	(0)
2006	→ Barnsley (loan)	0	(0)
2006	Buxton	6	(0)
2007	Parkgate	?	(0)
2007–2009	Bradford City	56	(6)
2009–2011	Mansfield Town	48	(5)
2011–2012	Gateshead	8	(0)
2012	Tamworth	11	(0)
2012	UR La Louvière	0	(0)
2013–2014	Chiangrai United	26	(5)
2014	Bentleigh Greens	3	(0)
2015	Customs United	9	(4)
2015	PTT Rayong	28	(2)
Total		195	(22)

International career
2001–2002	England U16	6	(0)
2004	England U18	1	(0)
2005	England U20	1	(0)
2009	England C	1	(0)
- * Club domestic league appearances and goals

Kyle Ashley Nix (born 21 January 1986) is an Australian-born English former football player and coach who played as a midfielder.

Nix was born in Sydney, Australia to English parents and moved to England at an early age. Nix started his football career with the youth teams at Manchester United and Aston Villa, before he joined Sheffield United. He had a loan spell with Barnsley, but left Sheffield to join non-league Buxton. He played seven games for Buxton during the 2006–07 season, before he joined Parkgate where he spent the remainder of the season.

He joined Bradford City for whom he made his debut in league football in August 2007. After two seasons with City, he was released from his contract and returned to non-league with Mansfield Town. He played two years with Mansfield during which time he reached the FA Trophy final before moving to another Conference side Gateshead. Internationally, Nix has represented England at youth level, playing for the U16, U18 and U20 teams, and semi-professional levels.

== Early life ==
Nix was born in Sydney, Australia, while his father, Peter, was playing football there. Peter had been a left winger, whose own professional career included 22 league games for Rotherham United. When the family returned to Rotherham, South Yorkshire, Nix started his own football career. Nix's brother Korey is also a footballer.

== Club career ==
=== Early career ===
Nix started his football career in England as a youth player for Premier League side Manchester United, before joining Aston Villa's youth side on a three-year deal. He was part of Villa's youth team which lost in the final of the 2004 FA Youth Cup to Middlesbrough. He trained with Port Vale in March 2005. In July 2005, he was signed by Sheffield United of the Championship on a one-year deal. His debut came in a League Cup tie against League Two side Shrewsbury Town, which United won on penalties, when he came on as a 90th-minute substitute. His only other appearance for Sheffield United also came as a substitute in the League Cup against Reading.

Towards the end of the 2005–06 season he was sent on loan to League One side Barnsley where he stayed for three months. Barnsley won promotion to the Championship although Nix did not play in any games. He returned to Sheffield United but he was among seven players to be released by manager Neil Warnock. Nix had an unsuccessful trial at Peterborough United, and one at Grimsby Town which was curtailed by an ankle ligament injury, and played a reserve team outing for Rotherham United. But after failing to win a place at any of the three league teams, he turned to non-league football. He first appeared for Northern Premier League side Buxton, making his debut against Bridlington Town on 11 November 2006. He played seven times for Buxton, scoring one goal, which came in a 9–0 Derbyshire Senior Cup victory over Blackwell Miners Welfare. For the rest of the 2006–07 season he turned out for Northern Counties East League side Parkgate. He also scored once for Parkgate—in a 4–3 Sheffield and Hallamshire Senior Cup semi-final defeat to Stocksbridge Park Steels.

=== Bradford City ===
In summer 2007, he was offered a short-term deal with League Two side Bradford City following a successful trial, teaming back up with Stuart McCall, who Nix knew from his days at Sheffield United. He made his Bradford debut against Wolverhampton Wanderers in a League Cup game scoring his first senior goal. His league debut came three days later in the first league game to be played at Shrewsbury Town's new ground the New Meadow. He was offered a longer-term deal at City, before becoming a regular first team player. His first league goal was a long-range equaliser as Bradford drew 1–1 with Chesterfield on 8 December 2007 before he added a second in successive games in a 2–1 defeat to Peterborough United. His goals helped to win him a contract extension in January until the end of the 2007–08 season. Later that month he improved his run of goals by scoring in three successive matches to help Bradford to five points from three games within the space of eight days. Nix stayed in the team for the remainder of the season, but it was not until April that he scored again, with a long-range volley against Brentford, as he bid for a new contract for the 2008–09 season. On 29 April 2008, Nix was offered a new deal, which he signed the following week to remain at Bradford for another season.

Nix started Bradford's first two games of the 2008–09 season in place of Joe Colbeck, who was suspended following a red card against Milton Keynes Dons at the end of the previous campaign. However, when Colbeck was available again, Nix was dropped to the substitutes' bench, with new signing Paul McLaren partnering Lee Bullock, who had returned from injury, in central midfield. Nix struggled for form but was also playing with an ankle injury, which eventually forced him to take a hospital scan in November. He was one of six club midfielders to be injured at the time. He returned to action later that month as a second-half substitute against his father's former team Rotherham United, at the Don Valley Stadium. However, he struggled to hold down a regularly place in the side because of new midfielders signed during the course of the season, and he was released at the end of the campaign having played less than half the games that he played in his first year at City. Nix was offered the chance to return to Bradford by McCall if he could not find a new club but he rejected the invitation.

=== Mansfield Town ===
Nix spent two weeks of summer on holiday in Mexico with three former Bradford colleagues, Joe Colbeck, Dean Furman and Nicky Law. Although Nix had reported interest from League Two clubs, upon his return from holiday he dropped down a division to go on trial with Conference National club Mansfield Town. After just three days of his trial he signed a two-year deal to become their 11th new player of the summer. Nix made his debut for Mansfield in their opening day 4–0 victory against Crawley Town, and scored his first goal for his new club at the end of September during a 3–1 defeat to Barrow. Nix enjoyed a run of games in the first team and was described by manager David Holdsworth as one of the club's "best players" until he suffered an ankle injury, which required surgery at a hospital in Northallerton and kept him out of first-team action until the new year. He returned to playing action for Mansfield reserves in late January and was back in the first team squad by the end of the month. He made his comeback to the first team in a 3–1 defeat to Stevenage Borough at the start of February. By the end of his first season with Mansfield, he had played 23 league games and scored twice.

During the follow pre-season, Holdsworth allowed Nix to attend a trial with Dutch Eerste Divisie side Sparta Rotterdam. Nix described it as a "chance of a lifetime" to pursue his dream of playing for the Australian national side with Sparta having an Australian coach. However, his trial was unsuccessful and he returned to Mansfield and he immediately scored in a friendly ahead of the new Conference season. Nix was not included in Mansfield's squad for the first three games of the season, and during the third match with the side losing, the club's fans were singing Nix's name. After eventually winning 3–1, Holdsworth said: "I know Kyle is a very good player and I respect the fans have individuals they like. But we have a healthy squad here and I picked what I felt was a winning side today which proved to be right." His first game of the season was as a late substitute for Adam Smith moments after Mansfield conceded an equaliser in a 1–1 draw with Kettering Town. His first start of the season came as Holdsworth made changes to personnel and formation for a game at Southport on 11 September. A 2–1 victory was Mansfield's third consecutive win. Before the end of the month, he had scored his first goal of the month, during a 5–0 victory against York City which put Mansfield second in the table.

At the end of his second season, Nix was one of five players to be released by Mansfield.

=== Gateshead ===
During the summer, he had trials with fellow Conference side Gateshead, scoring a penalty in a friendly against Carlisle United on 16 July 2011, before the game was abandoned after an hour due to torrential rain. Two weeks later, Nix signed an initial six-month contract with Gateshead. He made his debut as a second-half substitute on 13 August 2011 in Gateshead's 3–2 win over Kidderminster Harriers at Aggborough. He made his first start for Gateshead on 22 October 2011 in a 3–1 win against Telford United at New Bucks Head. Having started only two games in five months with Gateshead, Nix was released when his contract expired on 24 January.

=== Tamworth ===
On 14 February 2012, Nix joined Tamworth on a free transfer. He made his debut on 3 March coming on as a second-half substitute for Chez Isaac in a 3–0 league defeat to Fleetwood Town.

=== Chiangrai United ===
Following a brief spell at UR La Louviere Centre in Belgium where he did not play a competitive match Nix moved to Chiangrai United F.C. in the Thai Premier League in 2013. Nix made 26 appearances, scoring five goals and claiming three assists. Nix scored in matches against Muangthong, Chonburi F.C., Bangkok Glass and BEC Tero. Nix was forced to retire in 2016 following a diagnosis of heart tumours and blood clots which required open heart surgery.

== International career ==
Nix has appeared for various England youth international teams including under-16s, under-18s and under-20s. He scored twice for the under-17s, in a 4–0 victory over Faroe Islands and another in a 2–1 victory over Norway, during the Nordic International Tournament in 2002. After moving to Mansfield Town in 2009, he was eligible to play for the England C team, which is the team which represents England at non-league level. He was one of three Mansfield players, along with Louis Briscoe and Scott Garner, to play in a 1–1 with Hungary on 15 September 2009. He was called back up for the England C team by manager Paul Fairclough a year later.

Nix also holds an Australian passport, which he picked up in summer 2008, when he returned to the country for the first time since he left as a youngster in order to coach at Mitchelton Football Club. It enables him to play for the Australian side, a dream Nix wanted to pursue during his professional career.

== Coaching career ==
Nix runs a football coaching business alongside his two brothers in Queensland, Australia.

== Personal life ==
Nix holds an Australian passport. On 2 June 2014, Nix was reported missing by his family after leaving his home in Rotherham in the early hours of the morning. He was found safe and well by police later the same day.

== Career statistics ==
Appearances and goals by club, season and competition
Club	Season	League		FA Cup		League Cup		Other		Total	
Club	Season	Apps	Goals	Apps	Goals	Apps	Goals	Apps	Goals	Apps	Goals
Sheffield United	2005–06	0	0	0	0	2	0	0	0	2	0
Barnsley (loan)	2005–06	0	0	0	0	0	0	0	0	0	0
Buxton	2006–07	6	0	0	0	—		1	1	7	1
Parkgate	2006–07					—			1		1
Bradford City	2007–08	40	6	2	0	1	1	1	1	44	8
Bradford City	2008–09	16	0	1	0	1	0	1	0	19	0
Bradford City	Total	56	6	3	0	2	1	2	1	63	8
Mansfield Town	2009–10	23	2	0	0	—		0	0	23	2
Mansfield Town	2010–11	25	3	2	0	—		5	0	32	3
Mansfield Town	Total	48	5	2	0	—		5	0	55	5
Gateshead	2011–12	8	0	2	0	—		0	0	10	0
Tamworth	2011–12	11	0	0	0	—		0	0	11	0
Career total		129	11	7	0	4	1	8	3	148	15
