= Alex Rhodes (footballer) =

English footballer

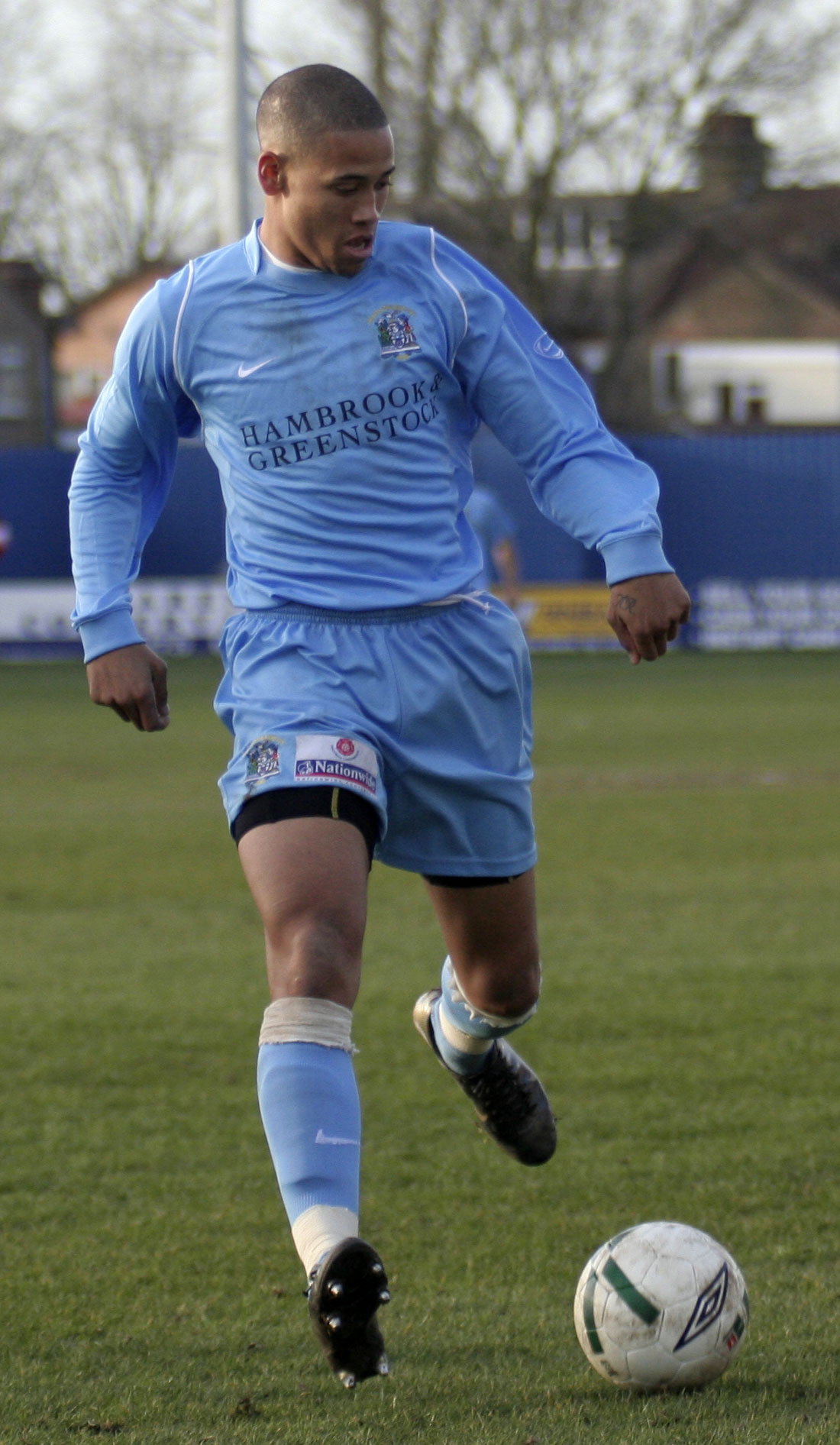
- Rhodes playing for Grays Athletic in 2007

Personal information
- Full name: Alexander Graham Rhodes
- Date of birth: 23 January 1982 (age 44)
- Place of birth: Cambridge, England
- Height: 5 ft 9 in (1.75 m)
- Positions: Striker; winger

Youth career
- Newmarket Town

Senior career*
Years	Team	Apps	(Gls)
1999–2003	Newmarket Town		
2003–2007	Brentford	57	(5)
2006	→ Swindon Town (loan)	4	(0)
2007	→ Grays Athletic (loan)	12	(1)
2007–2008	Bradford City	28	(3)
2008–2009	Rotherham United	18	(2)
2009	→ Woking (loan)	3	(1)
2009	Oxford United	4	(0)
2009–2010	Braintree Town		
2010	Grays Athletic	15	(0)
2010–2012	Canvey Island	52	(10)
2012–2013	Margate	21	(4)
- * Club domestic league appearances and goals

Alexander Graham Rhodes (born 23 January 1982) is an English former professional footballer who predominantly played as a left winger but also as a striker.

Rhodes started his career with Eastern Counties League Premier Division side Newmarket Town, where he came to prominence after scoring hat-tricks in three successive games in 2003. Rhodes scored 20 goals in the early part of the 2003–04 season, including 14 goals in 11 games in the league. After trials with several Football League clubs, he joined Brentford in November 2003 and scored the goal that ensured they were not relegated six months later. Rhodes scored five goals during his four seasons at Brentford, which were hampered by injury and included loan spells at Swindon Town and Grays Athletic. He signed for Bradford City in August 2007 but was released after one season, before joining Rotherham United. A loan spell at Woking was followed by his release from Rotherham in May 2009, when he dropped back out of the Football League to join Oxford United. He played just four games before leaving Oxford by mutual consent, and moved to Braintree Town, initially on a short-term deal. Rhodes rejoined Grays Athletic in January 2010, but was released at the end of the 2009–10 season.

== Personal life ==
Rhodes was born on 23 January 1982 in Cambridge, Cambridgeshire. He first attended a football game at his hometown side Cambridge United but grew up as a Liverpool fan. As well as football, he played cricket as a youngster. Rhodes is nicknamed "Tiger", because of his likeness to golfer Tiger Woods.

Rhodes had a tattoo of a 142-word quotation inked onto his leg in November 2008; the passage was originally written by peace activist Marian Williamson. It took five hours to inscribe onto Rhodes' leg. Rhodes said he had the tattoo done because "I had a few knock-backs when I was younger, when people were telling me I was too small, but I've always been determined to prove them wrong and I just feel this quotation is appropriate for me and my life."

== Career ==
=== Newmarket Town ===
Rhodes started his football career at non-League side Newmarket Town, breaking into the club's youth team at the age of 17. He combined his early years at the club with work as a coach at Cambridge Regional College. During the 2002–03 season, Rhodes scored more than 30 goals. He continued his goal-scoring form the following season and three successive hat-tricks in September 2003 attracted the attention of league scouts, including Norwich City, Cambridge United and Yeovil Town. He scored 21 goals for Newmarket in the Eastern Counties League during the first four months of the 2003–04 season. After trials with Yeovil, Norwich and Ipswich Town, Rhodes signed with Brentford in November 2003 for £10,000. It was the first time Brentford had paid a transfer fee for a player since Jean-Philippe Javary three years earlier, with the money donated by the club's fans. In his final game with Newmarket, he scored a hat-trick in a 4–3 victory against Great Yarmouth Town.

=== Brentford ===
Rhodes made his Brentford debut on Boxing Day 2003 in a 2–1 defeat to Bristol City but had to wait more than four months for his second game. He scored his first senior goal in his third game to ensure Brentford avoided relegation from the Second Division when they defeated AFC Bournemouth 1–0.

Rhodes returned to Newmarket Town for a pre-season friendly game with Brentford in August 2004, during which he scored a hat-trick in a 5–0 win. It helped him to win a place in the first team, and he scored on the first day of the 2004–05 season when Brentford lost 3–1 to Chesterfield. It was not until November 2004 that he scored his second goal in another defeat—2–1 to Bradford City. Five days later, he scored the winning penalty against Bristol City to take Brentford through to the second round of the FA Cup. In December, Rhodes scored in successive games, first in the league against Sheffield Wednesday, then another penalty in the FA Cup as Brentford's 2–1 victory against Hinckley United set up a third round tie with Luton Town. He was unable to play in the third round tie after he suffered a serious knee injury against Walsall in January 2005, which kept him out of action until September 2005. Although Rhodes had been a regular in the Brentford squad, his 22 league games included just four starts.

Injury again hit Rhodes' 2005–06 season, during which he scored just one goal in a 2–1 victory over Yeovil Town. He started just five league games during the season, as Brentford reached the League One play-offs. Rhodes started the second leg of the play-off semi-finals but a 2–0 defeat to Swansea City denied them a place in the final.

He made 11 appearances for Brentford at the start of the 2006–07 season, but on 10 October 2006, Rhodes signed for League Two side Swindon Town on a month's loan deal. He made his debut for Swindon against Grimsby Town, when he had a goal disallowed. Rhodes played just four games for Swindon all as substitute without scoring before returning to Brentford, before being immediately placed on the transfer list by Brentford manager Scott Fitzgerald. Rhodes played another three games for Brentford and had a trial with Yeovil Town in January 2007 but stayed with Brentford. In March 2007, he was loaned out again, to Conference side Grays Athletic for seven weeks. He played 12 league games and twice in the FA Trophy during his spell at Grays, scoring once in each competition, before he returned to Brentford in time to play in their final game of the season. Rhodes was offered a new contract by new Brentford manager Terry Butcher but turned it down and left the club on 25 June 2007. He played 65 games in all competitions for Brentford, but two-thirds of those were as substitute, scoring just six goals.

=== Bradford City ===
After trials with League Two sides Darlington and Bradford City, Rhodes signed for the latter on a short-term deal. He made his debut in City's first game of the season when they drew 1–1 with Macclesfield Town in a team featuring six new players. He scored his first goal in a 2–1 win over Chester City on 6 November 2007. He extended his stay at Bradford City until the end of the season in January 2008. Despite signing a new contract, injury kept Rhodes out of the side at the start of 2008 until 23 February when he scored his second Bradford goal in a 3–1 victory at Notts County after coming on as substitute. His performance in the Notts County victory earned him a place in the starting side three days later when he again scored in a 3–2 win against Rotherham United. On 29 April, he was one of 13 players released by manager Stuart McCall. Rhodes played a total of 30 games for Bradford, but started only 11 of those, scoring three goals.

=== Rotherham United ===
In June 2008, Rhodes returned to League Two, when he signed a one-year deal with Rotherham United, after their manager Mark Robins was impressed by Rhodes' performance against them the previous season. Rotherham were deducted 17 points at the start of the 2008–09 season because of improperly exiting administration. They started the season with a 1–0 against Lincoln City, in which Rhodes made his debut before he was substituted in the second half. He scored his first goal for Rotherham in a League Cup first round tie against local rivals Sheffield Wednesday at Hillsborough on 12 August 2008. Rhodes' goal game only seconds after Wednesday had opened the scoring, before the game finished 2–2. Rotherham eventually won through to the second round on penalties. His first league goal for the club came less than two weeks later as Rotherham beat Chester City 3–1 to maintain their winning start to the season. Rhodes was a regular in the Rotherham side at the start of the season as the team overhauled their point deduction to go above Grimsby Town in the league, but he was dropped for a game against his former side Bradford City in November 2008. He briefly returned to the side the following month for a Football League Trophy area semi-final with Darlington, which Rotherham won on penalties, but did not play again until the two sides met once more in a league game at the end of January 2009.

It was only a brief return to the side and two months later Rhodes joined Conference National side Woking on loan for the rest of the season. His debut for Woking came two days later in the club's 1–1 draw with Wrexham, with Rhodes being substituted towards the end of the second half by Joel Ledgister. He played three games for Woking, scoring one goal. Rhodes returned to Rotherham but was released by the club having played 18 games and scoring four goals during his one season stay.

=== Return to non-League ===
Having been released, Rhodes returned to the Conference by joining Oxford United on a free transfer in May 2009. Rhodes made his Oxford debut in their opening game of the season against York City as a second-half substitute for Jack Midson to help his team come from 1–0 down to win 2–1. However, after he had played just four games, Rhodes left by mutual consent.

Rhodes immediately joined Conference South side Braintree Town, initially on a contract until the start of January. His new assistant manager Jason Broom described Rhodes as an "exciting" talent. He made his debut against St Albans City helping to create his new side's goal in a 1–1 draw. Rhodes failed to impress and was released after Christmas 2009.

Rhodes rejoined former club Grays Athletic, where he had played on loan in 2007, on 19 January 2010. He scored a goal on his debut in a hastily arranged friendly, after their league game with Kidderminster Harriers was postponed, later in the week during a 4–1 victory against Aveley. Rhodes' senior debut came at the end of the same week, when he was one of six new members of manager Julian Dicks' side, only for them to lose 4–0 to Rhodes' former team Oxford United. Rhodes was substituted by Harry Agombar during the second half. He was released at the end of the 2009–10 season, having made 15 appearances.

Rhodes instead started to train with A.F.C. Sudbury and played in a pre-season friendly against Bury Town, during which he scored to help Sudbury win 4–3. However, although Rhodes said he would like to join the semi-professional Isthmian League Division One North side, he wanted to keep his options open in case he could remain in the professional game. A week later, he was given a trial with League Two Hereford United. Instead, the following week, Rhodes signed for Isthmian League Premier Division side Canvey Island and immediately went into the first-team to make his debut on 28 August in a home league match against Carshalton Athletic, which finished 1–1, with Rhodes close to scoring what would have been a late winning goal for his new club. Rhodes' first goals for Canvey Island came in a FA Cup first round qualifying match against Newport Pagnell Town, scoring twice in a 4–1 victory. He scored again in the next round to put Canvey into the third qualifying round. Rhodes signed a contract to keep him with the club until the end of the season and scored two more in Canvey's ultimate exit from the FA Cup.

== Career statistics ==
Appearances and goals by club, season and competition
Club	Season	League			FA Cup		League Cup		Other		Total	
Club	Season	Division	Apps	Goals	Apps	Goals	Apps	Goals	Apps	Goals	Apps	Goals
Newmarket Town	2003–04	Eastern Counties League Premier Division	11	14	0	0	—		0	0	11	14
Brentford	2003–04	Second Division	3	1	0	0	—		0	0	3	1
Brentford	2004–05	League One	22	3	4	1	1	0	1	0	28	4
Brentford	2005–06	League One	17	1	0	0	0	0	1	0	18	1
Brentford	2006–07	League One	15	0	0	0	1	0	0	0	16	0
Brentford	Total		57	5	4	1	2	0	2	0	65	6
Swindon Town (loan)	2006–07	League Two	4	0	0	0	0	0	0	0	4	0
Grays Athletic (loan)	2006–07	Conference Premier	12	1	0	0	—		2	1	14	2
Bradford City	2007–08	League Two	28	3	1	0	1	0	0	0	30	3
Rotherham United	2008–09	League Two	18	2	2	0	4	1	3	0	27	3
Woking (loan)	2008–09	Conference Premier	3	1	0	0	—		0	0	3	1
Oxford United	2009–10	Conference Premier	4	0	0	0	—		0	0	4	0
Braintree Town	2009–10	Conference South	6	0	0	0	—		0	0	6	0
Grays Athletic	2009–10	Conference Premier	15	0	0	0	—		0	0	15	0
Canvey Island	2010–11	Isthmian League Premier Division	38	8	4	5	—		1	0	43	13
Canvey Island	2011–12	Isthmian League Premier Division	14	2	2	0	—		2	1	18	3
Canvey Island	Total		57	5	4	1	0	0	2	0	65	6
Career total			210	36	13	6	7	1	10	2	240	45
