= Willy Topp =

Chilean footballer and manager (born 1986)

Personal information
- Full name: Willy Adolfo Topp Bravo
- Date of birth: 4 March 1986 (age 40)
- Place of birth: Temuco, Chile
- Position: Forward

Team information
- Current team: Philadelphia Union U14

Youth career
- 1998–2003: Universidad Católica

Senior career*
Years	Team	Apps	(Gls)
2004–2007	Universidad Católica	7	(0)
2005	→ Deportes Temuco (loan)	3	(0)
2006	→ Deportes Puerto Montt (loan)	3	(0)
2007–2008	Bradford City	13	(0)
2009	Lorca FC	0	(0)
2009	Jumilla CF	2	(0)
2010	Royal Montegnée	3	(1)
2014–2017	Fontsanta Fatjó	–	(–)
Total		31	(1)

International career
2003–2005	Chile U17	4	(4)

Managerial career
- 2014–2017: Fontsanta Fatjó
- 2017–2019: Espanyol (youth)
- 2018–2019: Footvia Academy
- 2018–2019: Masnou B
- 2020–2021: Espanyol Academy (New Jersey)
- 2022–: Philadelphia Union U14
- * Club domestic league appearances and goals

Willy Adolfo Topp Bravo (born 4 March 1986), sometimes also known as Billy Topp, is a Chilean football manager and former footballer who played as a striker. Topp has also been involved with the youth levels of Chile's national set-up.

Topp started his career in his homeland with Universidad Católica, where he first played at the age of 16. He featured for them in the Milk Cup international youth tournament in 2003 and appeared on loan with other Chilean sides Temuco and Puerto Montt. In 2007, he joined Bradford City in England's League Two, but he played just 13 games in little more than a year, before he was released from his contract six months early. He spent a brief time playing semi-professionally with Jumilla Club de Fútbol in the Spanish Tercera División Group 13 before moving to Royal Montegnée.

== Club career ==
=== Universidad Católica ===
Born in Temuco, Chile, on 4 March 1986, Topp's football career started with Universidad Católica in his native Chile at the age of 11. In the 2002–03 season, he scored 23 goals in 28 games with Católica's youth team, helping the under-20 side become champions and earning him a call-up to Chile's squad for the South American under-17 tournament. Later in the year, he was selected to play for Católica in the Milk Cup international youth tournament in Northern Ireland, where the team came third. As a result of his performances in the tournament, Topp was invited to train with English side Manchester City. However, because he was not yet 18 years, he was unable to remain with the club and returned to Chile.

Topp first played for the Católica's senior teams at the age of just 16 in a friendly against Santiago Morning. He also had loan spells at Deportivo Temuco in 2005, where he suffered a broken metatarsal injury, and Club de Deportes Puerto Montt in 2006. He also came on as a substitute for Diego Maradona for the final four minutes of a charity match contested between Católica and Chile in February 2006. After his contract with Católica expired, Topp decided to leave the club and attempt to sign for a European club taking advantage of his EU passport.

=== Bradford City ===
Topp was due to sign for Belgian side Royal Racing Football Club Montegnée but instead returned to England in September 2007 for a trial with League Two side Bradford City as part of a deal between the two sides. After scoring in his first trial game for the reserves against Coventry City on 19 September, manager Stuart McCall decided to buy Topp. His protracted move took nearly three months to complete, after first a disagreement between Bradford and his former club Católica, then a hold-up with the English Football Association, before Topp was signed for £35,000 on 11 December 2007—the first time City had paid money for a player since Andy Tod in 2001. Topp made his Bradford debut as a second-half substitute in a 3–1 defeat to Hereford United on 29 December 2007. His first start came a month later when he made one goal and nearly scored another as Bradford defeated Shrewsbury Town 4–2. It was the first of four successive games in all of which he was substituted during the second half before he was diagnosed with the muscle-tightening condition posterior compartment syndrome. In March 2008, Topp visited a medical specialist to prepare for an operation on his thigh, so that he could be ready for the 2008–09 pre-season.

Topp went back home to Chile during the summer and returned to play in several pre-season friendlies but was an unused substitute for Bradford's first home league game of the season against Notts County, and was left out of the side three days later against Huddersfield Town in the League Cup after his representatives said he wanted to leave the club. Topp held talks with manager Stuart McCall and told him he wanted to stay with the club. Topp subsequently came on as a late substitute in a 2–0 victory against Macclesfield Town the following day. He made only one more appearance as a substitute before he was released from his contract six months early, in December 2008, to let him find a new club. He played a total 13 games for Bradford, starting six, without scoring.

=== Jumilla CF ===
In 2009, he joined Lorca FC, but after a short time, he resigned. In August 2009, after eight months out of the game, Topp joined Jumilla Club de Fútbol, a side playing in Tercera División Group 13, part of the fourth tier of Spanish football. He made his debut for Jumilla on 14 September against CD Plus Ultra when he came on as a second-half substitute during a 3–0 victory. He started the following game to help his new side defeat CD Beniel 5–0.

=== Royal Montegnée ===
In January 2010, Topp left Jumilla to return to Belgian side Royal Montegnée where he had previously been registered as a player before moving to Bradford City. Topp made his debut for Montegnee in a 4–0 victory against Oreye on 7 March, but had a poor game reported to be because of a poor selection of boots. Later the same month, Topp was sent off during a 3–1 victory, but the following weekend scored his first goal for Montegnée in another 3–1 win.

=== Fontsanta Fatjó ===
In 2016, he joined Fontsanta Fatjó, a side playing in Segona Catalana.

== International career ==
Topp was involved in the senior Chile national team set up in 2003 and 2004 under the management of Juvenal Olmos, and has represented his country at the under-17 level, once scoring a hat-trick in a game against Paraguay in September 2002. In 2003, he was in Chile's under-17 squad to play in the South American under-17 tournament. Chile failed to qualify for the FIFA World Championships in Finland later the same year, in the tournament. In December 2004, Topp scored against Uruguay for the under-20 side in a preparation game for a tournament in Colombia the following year. However, he was left out of his country's final squad for the tournament, and for the subsequent squad for the 2005 FIFA World Youth Championship in The Netherlands.

== Managerial career ==
He began his managerial career as the manager of Fontsanta Fatjó in the Segona Catalana at the same time he was a player. Next, he has worked as a coach for RCD Espanyol and Philadelphia Union Academies and CD Masnou B.

== Playing statistics ==
Updated to 3 January 2010.

Club	Season	League		FA Cup		League Cup		Other		Total	
Club	Season	Apps	Goals	Apps	Goals	Apps	Goals	Apps	Goals	Apps	Goals
Universidad Católica											
Temuco (loan)											
Puerto Montt (loan)											
Bradford City	2007–08	11	0	0	0	0	0	0	0	11	0
Bradford City	2008–09	2	0	0	0	0	0	0	0	2	0
Bradford City	Total	13	0	0	0	0	0	0	0	13	0
Jumilla Club de Fútbol	2009–10										
Royal Racing Football Club Montegnée	2009–10										
Career totals		13	0	0	0	0	0	0	0	13	0

== Honours ==
Universidad Católica

- Primera División de Chile: 2005 Clausura
