= Peter Nix =

English footballer (born 1958)

Personal information
- Date of birth: 25 January 1958 (age 68)
- Place of birth: Rotherham, England
- Position: Left winger

Youth career
- Rotherham United

Senior career*
Years	Team	Apps	(Gls)
1977–1980	Rotherham United	22	(2)
1984	Penrith City	9	(0)
- * Club domestic league appearances and goals

Peter Nix (born 25 January 1958 in Rotherham) is an English former footballer who played for Rotherham United and Penrith City. Peter's son, Kyle Nix, is also a footballer and currently plays in the Thai Premier League for Chiangrai United F.C.
