= Joe Colbeck =

English footballer

Personal information
- Full name: Philip Joseph Colbeck
- Date of birth: 29 November 1986 (age 39)
- Place of birth: Bradford, England
- Position: Right winger

Youth career
- 2002–2004: Bradford City

Senior career*
Years	Team	Apps	(Gls)
2004–2009	Bradford City	109	(8)
2007	→ Darlington (loan)	6	(2)
2009–2010	Oldham Athletic	27	(1)
2010–2012	Hereford United	72	(6)
2012–2014	Grimsby Town	67	(4)
2014–2015	Bradford Park Avenue	37	(2)
2015–2017	Harrogate Town	77	(5)
Total		395	(28)
- * Club domestic league appearances and goals as of 05:24, 6 July 2017 (UTC)

Philip Joseph Colbeck (born 29 November 1986) is an English former footballer who played as a right winger.

Born in Bradford, England, he joined his hometown club, Bradford City, as a youth team player in 2002, making his debut two years later. He played more than 100 league games for Bradford during five years in the first team. Colbeck nearly left Bradford in 2007 when he was made available for transfer and played six games on loan for Darlington. However, he returned following his loan spell and went on to win Bradford City's player of the season award during the 2007–08 campaign. He turned down a new deal a year later and joined Oldham Athletic on transfer deadline day in September 2009 to rejoin manager Dave Penney, for whom he played at Darlington. When Penney was sacked after less than a year in charge, Colbeck also soon left and joined Hereford United before spending several years with Grimsby Town and moving to Harrogate Town.

== Career ==
=== Bradford City ===
Colbeck was born in Bradford and attended Pudsey Tyersal School. Bradford City youth team coach Jon Pepper brought him to the club in 2002, and having rising through the junior ranks at City, Colbeck had barely featured for the reserves when he made his senior debut in a League Cup defeat to Notts County on 25 August 2004 at Valley Parade. It was his only first-team game during the season. It was another 17 months before his next appearance for City when he was a late substitute on 7 January 2006 in a 1–0 defeat to Chesterfield. Colbeck broke into the team on a more regular basis and made 11 appearances, including five starts, during the latter half of the 2005–06 season, and was one of six junior players to earn a one-year contract at the League One club.

His first full season in the first team was during 2006–07, although he was kept out of the team during the early part of the season by winger Jermaine Johnson. After eight straight games as substitute, Colbeck made his first start of the season in a West Yorkshire derby against Huddersfield Town on 7 October 2006. He continued to play more games in the side but as City struggled, Colbeck was sent off during a vital game against Oldham Athletic in April 2007. He was suspended following the red card but returned to the side after his suspension, and was involved in the 3–0 defeat to Chesterfield which confirmed Bradford's relegation from League One.

Colbeck started the new season in League Two as a substitute, but won a place in the side, and scored his first senior goal against Lincoln City more than three years after his debut. However, after a mistake cost defeat to Milton Keynes Dons, he was told he could join another club on loan. On 24 October 2007, Colbeck went on a month-long loan to Darlington to take the place of injured Julian Joachim. Colbeck scored in both his second and third games before the loan was extended for a second month. The loan deal was cut short when he returned to Bradford City in December 2007 after he had made six appearances for Darlington, but Darlington manager Dave Penney was disappointed to see Colbeck leave saying, "Joe was fantastic for us. He scored a couple of goals and had a real effect on us so we're sorry to see him go."

He immediately went back into the Bradford side, and added his second goal for the club in a 2–0 win over Accrington Stanley on New Year's Day. Darlington made a bid to sign Colbeck on a permanent basis during January 2008, but City chairman Julian Rhodes turned down the bid, and Colbeck was a regular player for the rest of the 2007–08 season. The run of games included the third goal in a 3–1 win against former side Darlington at the Darlington Arena. On 19 April 2008, he scored his sixth goal for the club, but first in a home game, when his last minute goal gave Bradford a 2–1 win over Grimsby Town. Three days later, Colbeck was announced as the club's player of the season, even though he had started just 26 league games, 23 of which came in City's 26 games since Colbeck returned on loan from Darlington. Colbeck was surprised to win the award, saying: "If you'd said at the beginning of the season that I would win this award, I'd have thought you were mad. I wasn't even a regular in the team." However, in the following league game, Colbeck was sent off for the second time in his career, for a foul on Dean Lewington, as City lost 2–1 to Milton Keynes Dons, which meant he missed the final game of the season through suspension.

Colbeck had been playing since January with a groin injury, which hampered his preparations for the 2008–09 season and prevented him from playing in Bradford's first three pre-season friendly matches. His suspension also kept him out of Bradford's first two games of the season, but he returned for a 2–0 victory against Macclesfield Town. He provided a cross for Peter Thorne to open the scoring after ten minutes. Colbeck helped City to go top of the league six matches into the season, and although he scored his first goal of the season in the seventh game, City lost 3–1 to AFC Bournemouth. He added a second in a 2–2 home draw with Gillingham, before he broke a bone in his foot the following week against Grimsby Town. Colbeck was unable to play for nearly three months. He returned from injury in January by playing in two reserve games, leading up to his first-team return on 24 January as a late second-half substitute for Omar Daley in a 3–3 draw with Luton Town. Colbeck broke back into the starting eleven the following month, once again for Daley, who was ruled out for the season with his own knee injury. He was a regular in the team for the rest of the season, playing a further 16 games but he struggled for form and was unable to add to his two goals.

City missed out on promotion and as a result had to cut their wage budget. However, Colbeck, whose contract had expired, was offered a new three-year deal on improved terms. He turned down the offer and stayed at the club on a week-to-week basis on his previous terms. He was watched in a pre-season friendly playing for City against Bradford Park Avenue by his former Darlington boss Dave Penney, who had since been appointed Oldham Athletic manager. Colbeck started the season with Bradford and played another five games, bringing his total to the club to 109, of which 41 were as substitute.

=== Oldham Athletic ===
Colbeck left Bradford in September 2009, on the final day of the summer transfer window to join Penney at League One side Oldham Athletic. The transfer fee was undisclosed, with Bradford entitled to a sum because of Colbeck's age – the Yorkshire Post newspaper reported the fee to be around £60,000. Penney described Colbeck as being in "the Stanley Matthews mould" and hoped his new signing would give his team some width. Colbeck's Oldham debut at the end of the same week finished in a 3–0 defeat for his new team to Hartlepool United. Although described as a "tireless worker", some of his performances angered Oldham's fans, with Colbeck unable to "stamp his authority on games" and his "lack of quality" to deliver a final cross. In what was his first game for more than a month, Colbeck scored his first Oldham goal in a 4–2 defeat to Swindon Town on 9 February 2010. Colbeck also missed part of Oldham's run-in to the end of the season because of an ankle injury and ended up playing 28 games during his first season with Oldham, but was one of three summer signings which the Oldham Advertiser said had not impressed the Latics fans. When Penney was sacked at the end of the campaign and replaced by Paul Dickov, Colbeck was almost immediately made available for transfer ahead of the 2010–11 season.

=== Hereford United ===
Colbeck almost immediately left Oldham and dropped back into League Two to sign for Hereford United on a two-year contract. His new manager Simon Davey described Colbeck as "just the ideal attacking winger we've been looking for throughout pre-season and I think he is the final piece in the jigsaw". Two days later, Colbeck scored two goals in a pre-season friendly victory against Neath before being named as one of six Hereford debutants on the opening day of the 2010–11 League Two season as his new side won 1–0 at Crewe Alexandra. Colbeck scored his first goal with Hereford on 2 November 2010 in a 2–2 draw with Aldershot Town. Hereford, however, recorded just one win from their first ten league games, and were bottom of the league by October when Davey was sacked. Davey was replaced by Jamie Pitman, who helped to improve Hereford's form. Colbeck received the first red card of his Hereford career for a professional foul during a 4–0 defeat to Southend United on 18 March 2011. His ensuing suspension was one of only two games he missed all season helping him to 50 games in a single season for the first time in his career.

However, early in the following season, he missed three months because of a knee injury. He returned from injury on 17 December 2011.

=== Grimsby Town ===
On 20 June 2012, Colbeck signed a two-year deal with Grimsby Town. Colbeck scored his first goal for Grimsby on 27 August 2012 against Mansfield Town, scoring the third goal of the game on 61 minutes, after good link up play between Greg Pearson who crossed into the box, the ball bouncing off strike partner Andy Cook for Colbeck to side-foot it into the top corner, the game finishing a 4–1 to the Grimsby. On Boxing Day 2012, Colbeck provided 3 assists and scored directly from a corner in the 4–1 Lincolnshire derby win over Lincoln City at Sincil Bank. On 8 January 2013 Colbeck was fined by The Football Association over comments he made on his Twitter account.

Colbeck was released by Grimsby on 9 May 2014.

=== Non League ===
On 8 July 2014, Colbeck signed a one-year contract with Bradford Park Avenue. He then went in to join Harrogate Town but was released at the end of the 2016–17 season. He then joined Maltese side Hibernians on trial during the summer.

== Playing style ==
Colbeck is a pacy midfielder who normally plays on the right wing. Talking about his game, Colbeck says: "I love taking players on, I think that's my best attribute." At Bradford, his manager Stuart McCall praised his hard work and commitment, but said he became frustrated about his lack of end product. McCall also said Colbeck's crossing needed to be improved. Another of his managers Dave Penney described Colbeck as being in "the Stanley Matthews mould", in reference to the former Blackpool winger. However, Colbeck's performances at Oldham also earned mixed reviews akin to McCall's comments, with fans and journalists describing him as a "tireless worker" but his crossing had a "lack of quality". Going into the 2007–08 season, Colbeck had yet to score a goal. Before the season, he admitted he needed to score more goals and went on to score six goals during the campaign, although it remains a career high.

== Career statistics ==
Appearances and goals by club, season and competition
Club	Season	Division	League		FA Cup		League Cup		Other^{[A]}		Total	
Club	Season	Division	Apps	Goals	Apps	Goals	Apps	Goals	Apps	Goals	Apps	Goals
Bradford City	2004–05	League One	0	0	0	0	1	0	0	0	1	0
Bradford City	2005–06	League One	11	0	0	0	0	0	0	0	11	0
Bradford City	2006–07	League One	32	0	1	0	0	0	1	0	34	0
Bradford City	2007–08	League Two	33	6	0	0	1	0	1	0	35	6
Bradford City	2008–09	League Two	28	2	0	0	0	0	1	0	29	2
Bradford City	2009–10	League Two	5	0	0	0	1	0	0	0	6	0
Bradford City	Total		109	8	1	0	3	0	3	0	116	8
Darlington (loan)	2007–08	League Two	6	2	0	0	0	0	0	0	6	2
Oldham Athletic	2009–10	League One	27	1	1	0	0	0	0	0	28	1
Hereford United	2010–11	League Two	44	5	4	0	1	0	1	0	50	5
Hereford United	2011–12	League Two	28	1	0	0	2	0	0	0	30	1
Hereford United	Total		72	6	4	0	3	0	1	0	80	6
Grimsby Town	2012–13	Conference National	40	3	1	0	0	0	6	0	47	3
Grimsby Town	2013–14	Conference National	28	1	5	0	0	0	5	1	38	2
Grimsby Town	Total		68	4	6	0	0	0	11	1	85	5
Bradford Park Avenue	2014–15	Conference North	37	2	0	0	0	0	1	0	38	2
Career total			319	23	12	0	6	0	16	1	353	24

A. Other matches are for games in the Football League Trophy.

== Honours ==
Grimsby Town

- Lincolnshire Senior Cup (1): 2012–13
- FA Trophy : Runners-up, 2012–13

Individual

- Bradford City player of the season: 2007–08
