= Craig Bentham =

English footballer

Personal information
- Full name: Craig Martin Bentham
- Date of birth: 7 March 1985 (age 41)
- Place of birth: Bingley, England
- Height: 1.75 m (5 ft 9 in)
- Position: Midfielder

Youth career
- 2001–2004: Bradford City

Senior career*
Years	Team	Apps	(Gls)
2004–2008	Bradford City	30	(0)
2008	→ Farsley Celtic (loan)	16	(1)
2008–?	Farsley Celtic	?	(?)
- * Club domestic league appearances and goals as of 22:54, 6 July 2010 (UTC)

Craig Martin Bentham (born 7 March 1985) is an English footballer who plays as a midfielder. He started his career at Bradford City, where he had been from 2001 to 2008. He was loaned out to Farsley Celtic of the Conference National in 2008 and he subsequently joined them permanently for a second spell.

== Playing career ==
Bentham graduated from the Bradford City youth team in 2004 and regularly captained the reserves side in 2004–05. He made his full debut on 26 February 2005 for Bradford City in a 1–1 draw with Walsall, receiving a yellow card. He made only one more appearance that season and has continued to struggle to hold down a first team place. An injury in pre-season prevented Bentham from playing until an FA Cup game in November of the 2006–07 season, before he became a first team regular during the latter half of the season when City were relegated to League Two, playing in 18 games.

With his league appearances limited to just two hundred substitute outings in the first half of the 2007–08 season, he signed a one-month loan deal at Conference National side Farsley Celtic on 3 January 2008. Two days later he made a "very good" debut for Farsley but they lost 3–1 to Histon after taking a first-half lead. The loan was extended beyond its initial one-month period, before Bentham scored his first senior goal in a 3–0 Conference victory over Woking on 16 February 2008. He played 16 league games for Farsley Celtic and was later named the club's most influential player in their end of season player awards, but he returned to Bradford City in April 2008. In Bentham's absence, Farsley lost their final six games and were relegated from the Conference National to the Conference North. He played once more for Bradford City but was one of 13 players to be released by manager Stuart McCall at the end of the season. He played just 30 league games for Bradford in four years. Six weeks after his release, he rejoined Farsley Celtic, following Tom Penford another midfielder who had been freed by Bradford City.
