= Ben Saynor =

English footballer (born 1989)

Personal information
- Date of birth: 6 March 1989 (age 37)
- Place of birth: Leeds, England
- Height: 1.91 m (6 ft 3 in)
- Position: Goalkeeper

Team information
- Current team: Bridlington Town

Youth career
- 2005–2006: Bradford City

Senior career*
Years	Team	Apps	(Gls)
2006–2008	Bradford City	0	(0)
2008–2009	Farsley Celtic	2	(0)
2010	Scarborough Athletic		(0)
2010	Ossett Albion	20	(0)
2010	Stalybridge Celtic	0	(0)
2010–2011	Bridlington Town	25	(0)
2011–	Frickley Athletic	32	(0)
- * Club domestic league appearances and goals as of 22:45, 6 July 2010 (UTC)

Ben Saynor (born 6 March 1989) is an English footballer who plays for Frickley Athletic as a goalkeeper.

== Career ==
He signed professionally for Bradford City at the age of 16. He made his debut senior appearance on 4 September 2007 in a 5–1 Football League Trophy defeat to Doncaster Rovers. On 29 April 2008, Saynor was deemed to be surplus to requirements at Valley Parade and was released by manager Stuart McCall along with 13 other Bradford players. He was given a trial with Mansfield Town, playing 45 minutes of their pre-season friendly with Matlock Town on 7 August 2008, which Mansfield won 2–0, but was not signed. Instead, on 7 November 2008, he joined Conference North side Farsley Celtic as their second-choice goalkeeper behind Curtis Aspden. The following day, he took his place on the bench in Farsley's 2–0 victory away at Workington.

In early 2010 he was playing for Ossett Albion before he joined Stalybridge Celtic but left in August without having played a first team game. He then joined Bridlington Town in September 2010. After leaving Bridlington Town at the start of the 2011/2012 season he joined Frickley Athletic in August 2011.
