= 1981–82 Bradford City A.F.C. season =

Bradford City A.F.C.
1981-82 season
- Division Four: 2nd Place (promoted)
- FA Cup: 1st Round
- League Cup: 3rd Round

The 1981–82 Bradford City A.F.C. season was the 69th in the club's history.

The club finished 2nd in Division Four, being promoted to Division Three, reached the 1st round of the FA Cup, and the 3rd round of the League Cup.

The club was promoted to Division Three at the end of the season, player-manager Roy McFarland's first season in charge.

== Sources ==
- Frost, Terry (1988). Bradford City A Complete Record 1903-1988. Breedon Books Sport. ISBN 0-907969-38-0.
