= TJ Moncur =

English footballer (born 1987)

Personal information
- Full name: Thomas James Moncur
- Date of birth: 23 September 1987 (age 39)
- Place of birth: Hackney, England
- Height: 5 ft 10 in (1.78 m)
- Position: Defender

Youth career
- –2004: Arsenal
- 2004–2005: Fulham

Senior career*
Years	Team	Apps	(Gls)
2005–2009	Fulham	0	(0)
2008	→ Bradford City (loan)	7	(0)
2008–2009	→ Bradford City (loan)	14	(0)
2009	Wycombe Wanderers	6	(0)
2010	Chesterfield	0	(0)
2010	Cray Wanderers	2	(0)
Total		29	(0)

International career
2002–2003	England U16	4	(1)
- * Club domestic league appearances and goals

Thomas James Moncur (born 23 September 1987) is an English footballer who was last known to have played for Cray Wanderers in the Isthmian Premier having been released by League Two side Chesterfield in 2010. He is a defender. He came through the ranks at Arsenal and Fulham without playing a first-team game, and has twice played on loan with Bradford City, before a free transfer to Wycombe Wanderers. He was released by Wycombe after playing only six games.

== Early life ==
Born in London, Moncur attended St Ignatius' College, a Catholic secondary school for boys, located in Enfield, Middlesex, from 1999 to 2004.

== Club career ==
=== Fulham ===
Moncur was a youngster with Arsenal until he was bought aged 16. He joined the Fulham academy where he was for three years under the tutelage of Billy McKinlay, until he signed a professional contract at the age of 19 in February 2007. In January 2008, he joined Bradford City on loan for a month to provide cover for the injured Mark Bower. He was an unused substitute as Bradford defeated Macclesfield Town on 2 February 2008. After being substitute for another three games, he made his senior debut on 23 February 2008 when he was booked in a 3–1 victory at Notts County. His loan deal was extended after making two first team games for City. He returned to Fulham in April 2008 because of personal problems, after he had played seven times for Bradford City. His form during the loan spell helped him to win a new one-year contract extension at Fulham in June 2008.

On 8 August 2008, a day before the start of the 2008–09 season, he signed another loan deal with Bradford City until 3 January 2009. The agreement gave Bradford the option for the discussion of a permanent deal with Moncur once the loan period was over. He made his first appearance of his second loan spell a day later, coming on as a substitute for Paul Arnison, once more against Notts County. In Moncur's first league start of the season, as a replacement for the injured Arnison, against Shrewsbury Town in September 2008, Moncur sustained a head injury when he collided with teammate Graeme Lee. Moncur continued for nine more minutes, before he collapsed and required 12 minutes of treatment on the pitch before being rushed to hospital. He was later released from hospital, but remembers nothing of the match and could not attend his own 21st birthday party because he was not allowed to drive to his London home. Moncur was sent back to Fulham on 1 January 2009 by Bradford so that they did not have to offer him an 18-month contract, having played 18 games for Bradford.

=== Wycombe Wanderers ===
Immediately upon his return to Fulham, Moncur was signed by another League Two club, Wycombe Wanderers on a free transfer, signing an 18-month contract. Moncur's debut at Wycombe was as a first-half substitute for Leon Johnson during their 1–0 defeat to Grimsby Town on 17 January 2009. Moncur was released by Wycombe, who had been promoted to League One in May, in October of the same year having played just six games with the Chairboys, all in the league.

=== Chesterfield ===
Moncur dropped back to League Two in February 2010 when he signed for Chesterfield on non-contract terms following a successful trial but was released only a month later without making a single appearance.

=== Cray Wanderers ===
Moncur joined Isthmian Premier side Cray Wanderers soon after being released by Chesterfield. He made his debut in the Kent Senior Cup against Ashford Town.

== International career ==
Moncur made four appearances for the England under-16 side between 2002 and 2003, scoring once. He featured in the Victory Shield and in the David Carins Memorial Trophy in County Antrim, Northern Ireland.
