= Luke Medley =

English footballer (born 1989)

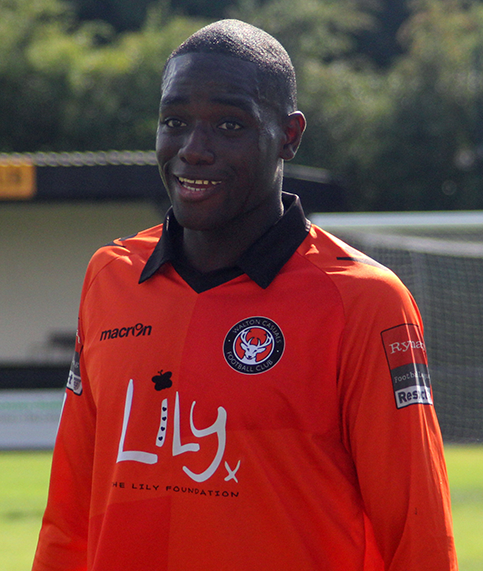
- Medley playing for Walton Casuals in 2015

Personal information
- Full name: Luke Anthony Cleve Medley
- Date of birth: 21 June 1989 (age 37)
- Place of birth: Greenwich, England
- Height: 6 ft 1 in (1.85 m)
- Position: Striker

Team information
- Current team: Lordswood

Youth career
- 2005–2006: Welwyn Garden City
- 2006: Barnet
- 2006–2007: Tottenham Hotspur

Senior career*
Years	Team	Apps	(Gls)
2007–2008	Bradford City	9	(2)
2008	→ Cambridge City (loan)	5	(0)
2008–2010	Barnet	19	(1)
2009	→ Havant & Waterlooville (loan)	8	(2)
2009–2010	→ Woking (loan)	17	(2)
2010	→ Havant & Waterlooville (loan)	13	(0)
2010–2011	Mansfield Town	16	(5)
2011	→ Aldershot Town (loan)	4	(0)
2011–2012	Kidderminster Harriers	13	(0)
2011–2012	→ Lincoln City (loan)	6	(0)
2012	→ Woking (loan)	0	(0)
2012	Bromley	3	(0)
2013	Hayes & Yeading United	4	(0)
2013	Goole	6	(0)
2013	Crawley Down Gatwick		
2014	Margate	9	(2)
2014–2016	Walton Casuals	65	(22)
2016–2017	Chatham Town	27	(15)
2017–2018	Cray Wanderers	23	(11)
2018–2019	Sheppey United	6	(4)
2019	Croydon	3	(2)
2019	Punjab United	1	(0)
2019–2020	Lordswood	33	(20)
2020–2021	Whitstable Town	8	(2)
2021–2022	Erith & Belvedere	?	(?)
2023–	Lordswood	9	(3)

Managerial career
- 2018: Greenwich Borough
- * Club domestic league appearances and goals as of 17:07, 12 October 2020 (UTC)

Luke Anthony Cleve Medley (born 21 June 1989) is an English footballer who plays as a striker, most recently for Lordswood.

As a junior, he was on the books of Welwyn Garden City, Barnet and Tottenham Hotspur. He joined Bradford City in 2007, and later the same year scored with his first touch in league football. He played on loan for Cambridge City, but left Bradford after just one season to return to London, and re-signed for Barnet. During his time with Barnet, he had loan spells twice at Havant & Waterlooville and Woking before he dropped back into non-league to sign for Mansfield Town, Kidderminster Harriers and Bromley.

== Career ==
=== Early career ===
Born in Greenwich, London, Medley attended Southgate College, where he played for the college football side which lost in the 2006 English Colleges' Football League Championship Final to Gateshead College. Medley also played for Welwyn Garden City, making his debut at the age of 16. During his time with Welwyn Garden City, the club was removed from the 2005–06 Football Association Challenge Vase competition, after Medley played against Newmarket Town despite being not registered by the qualification date.

Medley left Welwyn Garden City in 2006 to join Barnet's London-based Protec Football Academy, where he stayed for eight months, before graduating to the youth side of Premier League's Tottenham Hotspur, along with defender Chris Casey. Medley was released by Tottenham and was instead picked up by Bradford City under the caretaker management of David Wetherall following a trial.

=== Bradford City ===
Medley scored the winning goal on his Bradford debut in their 2–1 league victory over Wrexham on 25 August 2007, a volley from outside the area, just two minutes after coming on as a substitute. The goal was scored with his first touch on his professional first team debut. He played another three games before he joined Cambridge City on loan on 11 January 2008. He came close to scoring on his Cambridge debut the following day, when he struck the post in a 1–0 FA Trophy defeat to Droylsden, with his Bradford teammate Sean Taylforth on the opposing side. Medley played six games during his loan spell, including five in the Conference South, but failed to score.

He returned to Bradford and made several more appearances as a substitute. On 29 April 2008, Medley was offered a new contract to remain at Bradford, having played eight games for the club. Four days later, he scored on his first start for the club, when he converted a 44th-minute penalty against Wycombe Wanderers on the final day of the 2007–08 season. However, he decided to turn down City's contract offer, because he wanted to move closer to his London roots. He had scored two goals from just nine games during his time with Bradford.

=== Barnet ===
Less than three weeks later, Medley returned to former club Barnet, becoming the League Two side's first signing of the summer. Barnet eventually had to pay Bradford City £7,500 for Medley following a tribunal hearing. He made his Barnet debut on the opening day of the 2008–09 as a second-half substitute against Chesterfield. Barnet lost the game 3–1. Medley's first goal for Barnet came in his eighth league game, as they defeated Rotherham United 4–3 despite playing the game with ten men for an hour. It was Medley's only goal from 20 appearances in all competitions, including 17 in the league, before Christmas; he was subsequently dropped from the team and found more competition for places when Barnet signed 40-year-old striker Paul Furlong.

After failing to play for Barnet during 2009, he was loaned out to Conference South side Havant & Waterlooville in March for one month. Medley's debut came just one day after signing as he helped Havant to defeat Weston-super-Mare 1–0 in their fight against relegation, with Medley coming close to scoring. He scored his first goal for Havant on his home debut during a 3–3 draw with Maidenhead United. His second goal came in a 3–0 win over Fisher Athletic.

In July 2009, he joined Conference South side Woking on a six-month loan. Medley made his debut in the opening day of the season in Woking's first-ever game in the Conference South—a game they won 2–1, before scoring his first goal in the club's second game just three days later against Chelmsford City, which Woking went on to lose. He returned to the side and scored his first FA Cup goal to help Woking defeat Maidstone United and put them just one round away from the full stages of the competition. In February 2010, he rejoined Havant & Waterlooville on loan. He played 13 games during his loan spell but failed to score. Medley returned to Barnet in April and made his first appearance for the Bees in almost a year against Accrington Stanley. However, Medley was one of a number of players that Barnet released at the end of the season.

=== Mansfield Town ===
Medley spent time on trial with Histon, Gillingham and Conference National-side Mansfield Town, before signing for the latter on a six-month deal thanks to fans group the 12th Stags, which helped to pay for some of his wages. Medley was a second-half substitute for Keigan Parker when making his debut for Mansfield in a 3–1 victory against Forest Green Rovers on the opening day of the 2010–11 Conference season. A week later, he scored his first goal and made another as Mansfield defeated Kidderminster Harriers 3–1. Medley had come on at half-time in the game, with Mansfield one goal down, and his performance was described as one that "terrified Kidderminster with his power and pace". After three appearances as substitute, Medley was rewarded for his display against Kidderminster by being given his first start for Mansfield in their next game, which finished in a 1–1 draw with Kettering Town. Medley remained a squad member but was still regularly used as a substitute and in one such appearance at the end of September, he scored twice in a game for the first time, to help lift Mansfield to the top of the table. Medley's contract was also extended to the end of the season following a club takeover.

=== Kidderminster Harriers ===
Medley left Mansfield in the summer and joined Kidderminster Harriers on a one-year contract. On 17 November 2011, Medley joined fellow Conference side Lincoln City on loan until the New Year. After making six substitute appearances for the Imps, he returned to Kidderminster Harriers following the completion of his loan contract. On 10 January 2012, he joined Woking for a second time on a month's loan.

=== Bromley ===
Medley left Kidderminster on 14 February 2012 when his contract was cancelled by mutual consent and on the same day he joined Bromley.

=== Hayes and Yeading United ===
He joined Hayes & Yeading in the summer of 2013 to boost the United attack for the forthcoming campaign. On 20 July 2013 he made his debut during pre-season for his new team, scoring one goal in the 2–1 defeat to Windsor. He then featured again in the 3–1 victory over Slough Town. After four league appearances, he left the club.

=== Non-League Ventures ===
Medley signed for Northern Premier League Division One South side Goole in October 2013. He made six appearances, without scoring, before being released. In November 2013, Medley signed for Crawley Down Gatwick of the Isthmian League Division One South, making his debut against Redhill on 30 November. In March 2014, Medley joined Margate of the Isthmian League Premier Division. He made his debut for the club on 15 March against Billericay Town.Medley later joined Walton Casuals in October 2014, and made his debut in the Isthmian League Cup First Round. Medley began the 2016–17 season at Chatham Town, scoring 15 goals in a struggling side. He transferred to Chatham's local rivals Cray Wanderers in January 2017 and made an immediate impact, scoring six times in three games in the first week of February.

Following spells at Sheppey United, Croydon and Punjab United, Medley found himself at SCEFL Premier side Lordswood for the 2019–20 season. This saw Luke hit his best goal scoring season yet netting 20 times in 33 games. He left the Lords at the end of the season and joined Whitstable Town. Failing to make an impact, a spell at Erith & Belvedere was followed by a return to a struggling Lordswood in January 2023. He scored his first goal in a 3-1 home victory against his former side Whitstable Town, a game in which he scored twice. Medley left Lordswood at the end of the 2022/23 season.

Following his departure from the "Lords", Medley had spells at Isthmian League side Phoenix Sports and has most recently played for SCEFL Premier side Hollands & Blair, making his debut for The Blair in a 3-1 home defeat against his former club Punjab United.

== Personal life ==
Luke is the older brother of professional footballer Zechariah Medley.

== Career statistics ==
As of 21 November 2010

Appearances and goals by club, season and competition
Club	Season	League		FA Cup		League Cup		Other (Note: Includes Football League Trophy and FA Trophy)		Total	
Club	Season	Apps	Goals	Apps	Goals	Apps	Goals	Apps	Goals	Apps	Goals
Bradford City	2007–08	9	2	0	0	0	0	0	0	9	2
Cambridge City (loan)	2007–08	5	0	0	0	0	0	1	0	6	0
Barnet	2008–09	18	1	1	0	1	0	1	0	20	1
Havant & Waterlooville (loan)	2008–09	8	2	0	0	0	0	0	0	8	2
Woking (loan)	2009–10	17	2	2	1	0	0	0	0	19	3
Havant & Waterlooville (loan)	2009–10	13	0	0	0	0	0	0	0	13	0
Barnet	2009–10	1	0	0	0	0	0	0	0	1	0
Mansfield Town	2010–11	16	5	0	0	0	0	0	0	16	5
Career total		86	12	3	1	1	0	2	0	92	13
