= David Brown (footballer, born 1989) =

English footballer

Personal information
- Full name: David Patrick Brown
- Date of birth: 29 May 1989 (age 37)
- Place of birth: York, England
- Height: 5 ft 7 in (1.70 m)
- Position: Striker

Team information
- Current team: Hyde United

Youth career
- 1997–2007: Leeds United

Senior career*
| Years | Team | Apps | (Gls) |
| 2007–2008 | Nottingham Forest | 0 | (0) |
| 2007–2008 | → Eastwood Town (loan) | 10 | (5) |
| 2008 | Bradford City | 5 | (1) |
| 2008–2009 | Guiseley | 37 | (21) |
| 2009 | Halifax Town | 4 | (1) |
| 2009–2010 | Eastwood Town | 33 | (18) |
| 2010–2012 | Garforth Town | 58 | (32) |
| 2012/13 2015/16 | Ossett Town | 46 | (17) |
| 2013–2015 | Scarborough Athletic | 31 | (11) |
| 2017–2019 | Hyde United | 36 | (18) |
- * Club domestic league appearances and goals as of 17:16, 2 August 2008 (UTC)

David Patrick Brown (born 29 May 1989) is an English footballer who plays as a striker. He came through the Leeds United Academy, before moving to Nottingham Forest. He scored on his Football League debut for Bradford City. Throughout his career he has won 3 promotions and has claimed Player of the year on one occasion in 2015.

== Career ==
Brown was born in York, and spent ten years in Leeds United's youth set up before he moved to Nottingham Forest at the start of the 2007–08 season. In November 2007, he joined Eastwood Town on an initial one-month loan, which was later extended for a second month. He returned to Forest in January 2008, after scoring five goals in ten games with Eastwood. He departed Forest and joined Bradford City on deadline day. After scoring twice in a 4–4 reserve game with Sunderland and another against Hull City, he was handed a contract until the end of the season. He made his debut two days later on 2 February 2008 as a second-half substitute and scored six minutes after he came on to give Bradford a 1–0 victory over Macclesfield Town. On 29 April 2008, Brown along with another 12 players out of contract were deemed to be surplus to requirements at Valley Parade and was released by manager Stuart McCall. He played five games for City, all as substitute.

Following his departure, Brown joined Conference National club York City on trial in July 2008, scoring twice in a pre-season friendly game against Tadcaster Albion, which York won 6–0. However, York manager Colin Walker said Brown and two other trialists were only making up the numbers and were unlikely to be signed permanently. Later the same month, he was given a trial at Northern Premier League Premier Division side Guiseley, coming on as a second-half substitute in a 2–1 pre-season friendly victory over former side Bradford City. After scoring 2 goals in another pre-season game against a Leeds United XI, he joined Guiseley on a permanent basis.

In January 2009, he joined Northern Premier League Division One North side Halifax Town along with fellow Bradford City player Paul Evans. Brown's debut was as a substitute one day after signing for Halifax, when he scored the final goal during a 4–1 victory against Wakefield.

Brown finished the season with Halifax, but in June 2009, he returned to Conference North side Eastwood Town, where he had previously played on loan.
