= Sean Taylforth =

English footballer

Personal information
- Full name: Sean James Taylforth
- Date of birth: 10 March 1989 (age 37)
- Place of birth: Middlewich, England
- Height: 6 ft 3 in (1.91 m)
- Positions: Striker; winger

Team information
- Current team: Northwich Victoria

Youth career
- ?–2007: Bradford City

Senior career*
Years	Team	Apps	(Gls)
2007–2009	Bradford City	1	(0)
2008	→ Droylsden (loan)	2	(0)
2008	→ Guiseley (loan)	3	(2)
2008	→ Guiseley (loan)	3	
2009	Northwich Victoria		
- * Club domestic league appearances and goals

Sean James Taylforth (born 10 March 1989) is an English former footballer who played in the Football League for Bradford City. He played as a striker or a winger.

== Career ==
Taylforth rose through the trainee ranks at Bradford City. He made his debut in a Football League Trophy game against Doncaster Rovers on 4 September 2007 which Bradford lost 5–1. Despite Taylforth's first team chances being limited, City manager Stuart McCall said the youngster was one to keep an eye on. Taylforth's second game was his FA Cup debut when he came on as a substitute in Bradford's second round defeat against Tranmere Rovers in December 2007. A month later he joined Conference National side Droylsden on loan. He made his debut for Droylsden as a second-half substitute the following day against Cambridge City, for whom Bradford teammate Luke Medley was also making his debut in a loan spell, with Droylsden winning 1–0 in the FA Trophy. He also played two Conference National league games during his loan spell before returning to Bradford in February. A month later he joined Northern Premier League Premier Division side Guiseley on another month-long loan deal. He made his debut for Guiseley as a second-half substitute on 24 March 2008 in a 0–0 draw with Stamford. The following week he scored his first goal, with the final goal of a 2–2 draw with Fleetwood Town. He was one of three junior players to be offered a new deal by manager Stuart McCall on 29 April 2008, and was rewarded with his first league appearance four days later in City's 2–1 defeat to Wycombe Wanderers on the final day of the 2007–08 season.

In October 2008, Taylforth rejoined Guiseley, on another one-month loan deal, going on to score on his first game back for Guiseley in a 2–2 draw with Matlock Town.
