= Tom Penford =

English footballer

Personal information
- Full name: Thomas James Penford
- Date of birth: 5 January 1985 (age 41)
- Place of birth: Leeds, England
- Height: 1.78 m (5 ft 10 in)
- Position: Midfielder

Youth career
- 1995–2002: Bradford City

Senior career*
Years	Team	Apps	(Gls)
2002–2008	Bradford City	38	(1)
2008–2009	Farsley Celtic	?	(?)
2009–2010	FC Halifax Town		
2010–	Guiseley	3	(0)
- * Club domestic league appearances and goals as of 23:00, 6 July 2010 (UTC)

Thomas James Penford (born 5 January 1985) is an English former professional footballer who played as a midfielder.

== Career ==
Born in Leeds, West Yorkshire, Penford joined Bradford City's youth system set up when he was 10 years old. He made his first team debut at Preston North End on 26 April 2003 in a 1–1 draw under the management of Nicky Law. Penford made a further two appearances that season.

But in four more seasons, Penford has found first team opportunities difficult to come by and had made just 23 first team appearances in five seasons by the end of the 2006–07 season. New manager Stuart McCall gave him a run in the side during March 2008, and he scored his first senior goal in a 3–1 win at Darlington on 29 March. However, Penford was one of 13 players to be released by McCall at the end of the 2007–08 season. After his release he joined Farsley Celtic for their first season in Conference North following their relegation from the Conference National in May.

In 2009, he joined Northern Premier League Division One side FC Halifax Town. Penford joined Guiseley in July 2010.

After retiring as a player he studied at the Open University and became a chartered accountant.
