= Julian Rhodes =

English football chairman

- Occupations: Businessman, football executive
- Known for: Former chairman and co-owner of Bradford City

Julian David Rhodes (born 20 March 1969) is a former chairman of English League Two football club Bradford City. He was chairman from December 2004, after taking the club out of administration. In 2007, he became joint-chairman with Mark Lawn. Rhodes sold the club in 2016 to German owners Edin Rahic and Stefan Rupp, but returned to the club in 2018 in a consultancy role.

He played lead guitar for the Heavy Metal band Pegasus between 1983 and 1985 with Eggy Watson (drums), Ant Smith (rhythm guitar) & Micky Rowbottom (vocals).

== Early life and career ==
He was born in Bradford and studied at Huddersfield Polytechnic.

Rhodes began working for his father at Filtronic after leaving university in 1992. The company was floated in 1994, and the family subsequently sold some of its shares before investing in Bradford City.

== Bradford City ==
=== Ownership and chairmanship ===
In 1997, Rhodes and his father, David, bought a 49 per cent stake in Bradford City from Geoffrey Richmond for a reported £3 million. They later provided security for a £5 million loan to finance the club's promotion campaign to the Premier League.

Bradford entered administration in 2002 with debts of approximately £36 million. Rhodes, then the club's chief executive, and his father contributed £5 million to its financial restructuring, while Gordon Gibb contributed £2 million.

Rhodes succeeded Gibb as chairman in 2004. The club entered administration for a second time that year. During a fundraising campaign organised by supporters and the Telegraph & Argus, Rhodes pledged to match the £250,000 target from his own funds. He subsequently continued negotiations with creditors, and the club's finances were secured in December 2004.

Lawn joined Rhodes as joint-chairman in 2007 after agreeing to clear the club's remaining debts. During their joint chairmanship, Bradford reached the League Cup final and won promotion to League One through the play-offs in 2013. In May 2016, Rhodes and Lawn sold the club to German investors Edin Rahic and Stefan Rupp and stepped down from their positions.

=== Return to the club ===
On 5 November 2018, Rhodes returned to Bradford City in a consultancy role, working with Rupp and Rahic while the club was bottom of League One. Following Rahic's departure, he served as interim chief executive. He remained in the role until Ryan Sparks was appointed chief executive in 2020.
