= 1992–93 Manchester United F.C. season =

English football club season

Manchester United
1992–93 season
- Chairman: Martin Edwards
- Manager: Alex Ferguson
- Premier League: 1st
- FA Cup: Fifth round
- League Cup: Third round
- UEFA Cup: First round
- Top goalscorer: League: Mark Hughes (15); All: Mark Hughes (16)
- Highest home attendance: 40,447 vs Blackburn Rovers (3 May 1993)
- Lowest home attendance: 19,998 vs Torpedo Moscow (16 September 1992)
- Average home league attendance: 35,132
Home colours	Away colours	Third colours

The 1992–93 season was Manchester United's first season in the newly formed FA Premier League, and their 18th consecutive season in the top division of English football.

The season was marked by the club winning the inaugural Premier League title, ending their 26-year run without an English league title. They ended up winning the title by a 10-point margin over runners-up Aston Villa, but had fought a three-horse race for much of the season with both Villa and Norwich City, not topping the table until January. The arrival of Eric Cantona from Leeds United for £1 million in late November helped boost United's title challenge, after they had been as low as 10th in the league shortly before. Cantona's arrival came after new striker Dion Dublin had been ruled out for six months with a broken leg, and Cantona was the catalyst in United's triumph which was confirmed on 2 May 1993 when Aston Villa lost at home to Oldham Athletic and therefore could not catch up to United.

Mark Hughes topped the goalscoring charts with 15 league goals, while Ryan Giggs was voted PFA Young Player of the Year for the second year in succession. Steve Bruce was United's captain for much of the season, as the veteran Bryan Robson missed many games due to injury. The arrival of Eric Cantona saw former striker Brian McClair switched into midfield, further restricting Robson's first team chances.

In the UEFA Cup, United lost on penalties to Torpedo Moscow of Russia, after two goalless draws. Their League Cup campaign ended in the Third Round with defeat at Aston Villa. Their FA Cup campaign ended in the Fifth Round when they lost 2–1 to Sheffield United.

Making their debuts this season were teenagers David Beckham, Nicky Butt and Gary Neville.

Before the season began, United were linked with a move for Southampton striker Alan Shearer, but the player signed for Blackburn Rovers instead. Dion Dublin was then signed from Cambridge United, but was injured just one month after his arrival, and United struggled to find the net in the weeks that followed, the club was linked with the signature of numerous other strikers. A £3 million bid for Sheffield Wednesday's David Hirst was rejected, while Sheffield United striker Brian Deane was also linked with a move to Old Trafford, but no firm offer was made. The hunt for a new striker ended on 26 November, when Eric Cantona was signed from Leeds United for a fee of just over £1 million.

By the end of the season, United were being linked with a move for Nottingham Forest's 21-year-old Irish midfielder Roy Keane, who was also a target for Arsenal and Blackburn Rovers. After the player came close to joining Blackburn, United signed him on 19 July 1993 for a British record fee of £3.75 million.

It was the last season at Old Trafford for midfielder Neil Webb, who returned to Nottingham Forest in November after losing his place in the Old Trafford first team. Russell Beardsmore, who did not play a game during the season, joined AFC Bournemouth on a free transfer at the end of the season.

== Pre-season and friendlies ==
Date	Opponents	H / A	Result F–A	Scorers	Attendance
28 July 1992	Start	A	3–0	Blackmore, Hughes, Wallace	4,118
29 July 1992	Celtic	A	1–1	Ince	34,368
31 July 1992	Lillestrøm	A	1–1	McClair	5,569
2 August 1992	Rosenborg	A	3–2	Ince, McClair, Irwin	9,379
4 August 1992	Elfsborg	A	0–0		4,491
9 August 1992	Republic of Ireland XI	A	2–0	McClair, Hughes	30,069
11 August 1992	Swansea City	A	1–1	Hughes	9,744
11 November 1992	Brøndby	H	3–2	McClair, Wallace, Phelan	5,102
1 December 1992	Benfica	A	0–1		40,000
12 May 1993	Aston Villa	N	1–1	Phelan	22,000
14 May 1993	Bristol City	A	3–3	Hughes (2), Blackmore	21,716
17 May 1993	Arsenal	A	4–4	Dublin (2), Sharpe (2)	22,117

== FA Premier League ==
Date	Opponents	H / A	Result F–A	Scorers	Attendance	League position
15 August 1992	Sheffield United	A	1–2	Hughes 61'	28,070	19th
19 August 1992	Everton	H	0–3		31,901	22nd
22 August 1992	Ipswich Town	H	1–1	Irwin 57'	31,704	20th
24 August 1992	Southampton	A	1–0	Dublin 88'	15,623	11th
29 August 1992	Nottingham Forest	A	2–0	Hughes 16', Giggs 49'	19,694	8th
2 September 1992	Crystal Palace	H	1–0	Hughes 88'	29,736	6th
6 September 1992	Leeds United	H	2–0	Kanchelskis 28', Bruce 44'	31,296	4th
12 September 1992	Everton	A	2–0	McClair 29', Bruce 76' (pen.)	30,002	3rd
19 September 1992	Tottenham Hotspur	A	1–1	Giggs 44'	33,296	4th
26 September 1992	Queens Park Rangers	H	0–0		33,287	4th
3 October 1992	Middlesbrough	A	1–1	Bruce 44' (pen.)	24,172	6th
18 October 1992	Liverpool	H	2–2	Hughes (2) 79', 89'	33,243	5th
24 October 1992	Blackburn Rovers	A	0–0		20,305	7th
31 October 1992	Wimbledon	H	0–1		32,622	7th
7 November 1992	Aston Villa	A	0–1		39,063	10th
21 November 1992	Oldham Athletic	H	3–0	McClair (2) 10', 28', Hughes 11'	33,497	8th
28 November 1992	Arsenal	A	1–0	Hughes 27'	29,739	5th
6 December 1992	Manchester City	H	2–1	Ince 20', Hughes 74'	35,408	5th
12 December 1992	Norwich City	H	1–0	Hughes 59'	34,500	4th
19 December 1992	Chelsea	A	1–1	Cantona 71'	34,464	3rd
26 December 1992	Sheffield Wednesday	A	3–3	McClair (2) 67', 80', Cantona 84'	37,708	2nd
28 December 1992	Coventry City	H	5–0	Giggs 6', Hughes 40', Cantona 64' (pen.), Sharpe 78', Irwin 83'	36,025	2nd
9 January 1993	Tottenham Hotspur	H	4–1	Cantona 40', Irwin 52', McClair 53', Parker 57'	35,648	1st
18 January 1993	Queens Park Rangers	A	3–1	Ince 26', Giggs 30', Kanchelskis 48'	21,117	1st
27 January 1993	Nottingham Forest	H	2–0	Ince 47', Hughes 68'	36,085	2nd
30 January 1993	Ipswich Town	A	1–2	McClair 84'	22,068	2nd
6 February 1993	Sheffield United	H	2–1	McClair 65', Cantona 80'	36,156	1st
8 February 1993	Leeds United	A	0–0		34,166	1st
20 February 1993	Southampton	H	2–1	Giggs (2) 82' 83'	36,257	2nd
27 February 1993	Middlesbrough	H	3–0	Giggs 21', Irwin 79', Cantona 86'	36,251	2nd
6 March 1993	Liverpool	A	2–1	Hughes 42', McClair 56'	44,374	1st
9 March 1993	Oldham Athletic	A	0–1		17,106	1st
14 March 1993	Aston Villa	H	1–1	Hughes 57'	36,163	1st
20 March 1993	Manchester City	A	1–1	Cantona 68'	37,136	2nd
24 March 1993	Arsenal	H	0–0		37,301	3rd
5 April 1993	Norwich City	A	3–1	Giggs 13', Kanchelskis 20', Cantona 21'	20,582	2nd
10 April 1993	Sheffield Wednesday	H	2–1	Bruce (2) 86', 90'	40,102	1st
12 April 1993	Coventry City	A	1–0	Irwin 40'	24,249	1st
17 April 1993	Chelsea	H	3–0	Hughes 24', Clarke 44' (o.g.), Cantona 48'	40,139	1st
21 April 1993	Crystal Palace	A	2–0	Hughes 64', Ince 89'	30,115	1st
3 May 1993	Blackburn Rovers	H	3–1	Giggs 21', Ince 60', Pallister 90'	40,447	1st
9 May 1993	Wimbledon	A	2–1	Ince 63', Robson 70'	30,115	1st

Pos	Team	Pld	W	D	L	GF	GA	GD	Pts	Qualification or relegation
1	Manchester United (C)	42	24	12	6	67	31	+36	84	Qualification for the Champions League first round
2	Aston Villa	42	21	11	10	57	40	+17	74	Qualification for the UEFA Cup first round (Note: Since League Cup winners Arsenal had qualified for the UEFA Cup Winners Cup by also winning the FA Cup, the UEFA Cup berth for the League Cup reverted to the league and was awarded to Norwich City. England was considered for an extra slot for the UEFA Cup after the 1993 Polish football scandal, but another one was given to Scotland, and it was thought excessive to give both two slots to Great Britain, and the extra place was awarded to Hungary.)
3	Norwich City	42	21	9	12	61	65	−4	72	Qualification for the UEFA Cup first round
4	Blackburn Rovers	42	20	11	11	68	46	+22	71	
5	Queens Park Rangers	42	17	12	13	63	55	+8	63	

Source: Premier League
Rules for classification: 1) points; 2) goal difference; 3) number of goals scored.
(C) Champions

== FA Cup ==
Date	Round	Opponents	H / A	Result F–A	Scorers	Attendance
5 January 1993	Round 3	Bury	H	2–0	Phelan 7', Gillespie 79'	30,668
23 January 1993	Round 4	Brighton & Hove Albion	H	1–0	Giggs 75'	33,600
14 February 1993	Round 5	Sheffield United	A	1–2	Giggs 30'	27,150

== League Cup ==
Date	Round	Opponents	H / A	Result F–A	Scorers	Attendance
23 September 1992	Round 2 First leg	Brighton & Hove Albion	A	1–1	Wallace 36'	16,649
7 October 1992	Round 2 Second leg	Brighton & Hove Albion	H	1–0	Hughes 14'	25,405
28 October 1992	Round 3	Aston Villa	A	0–1		35,964

== UEFA Cup ==
Date	Round	Opponents	H / A	Result F–A	Scorers	Attendance
16 September 1992	First round First leg	Torpedo Moscow	H	0–0		19,998
29 September 1992	First round Second leg	Torpedo Moscow	A	0–0 (3–4p)		11,357

== Squad statistics ==
Pos.	Name	League		FA Cup		League Cup		Europe		Total	
Pos.	Name	Apps	Goals	Apps	Goals	Apps	Goals	Apps	Goals	Apps	Goals
GK	(Denmark) Peter Schmeichel	42	0	3	0	2	0	1	0	48	0
GK	(England) Gary Walsh	0	0	0	0	1	0	1	0	2	0
DF	(Wales) Clayton Blackmore	12(2)	0	0(1)	0	1	0	1	0	14(3)	0
DF	(England) Steve Bruce	42	5	3	0	3	0	2	0	50	5
DF	(Republic of Ireland) Denis Irwin	40	5	3	0	3	0	2	0	48	5
DF	(England) Lee Martin	0	0	0	0	1	0	1	0	2	0
DF	(England) Gary Neville	0	0	0	0	0	0	0(1)	0	0(1)	0
DF	(England) Gary Pallister	42	1	3	0	3	0	2	0	50	1
DF	(England) Paul Parker	31	1	3	0	2	0	0(1)	0	36(1)	1
MF	(England) David Beckham	0	0	0	0	0(1)	0	0	0	0(1)	0
MF	(England) Nicky Butt	0(1)	0	0	0	0	0	0	0	0(1)	0
MF	(Scotland) Darren Ferguson	15	0	0	0	1	0	0	0	16	0
MF	(Wales) Ryan Giggs	40(1)	9	2	2	2	0	1	0	45(1)	11
MF	(Northern Ireland) Keith Gillespie	0	0	1(1)	1	0	0	0	0	1(1)	1
MF	(England) Paul Ince	41	6	2	0	3	0	1	0	47	6
MF	(Russia) Andrei Kanchelskis	14(13)	3	1	0	2(1)	0	1	0	18(14)	3
MF	(England) Mike Phelan	5(6)	0	2	1	0	0	1	0	8(6)	1
MF	(England) Bryan Robson	5(9)	1	0(1)	0	1	0	0(1)	0	6(11)	1
MF	(England) Lee Sharpe	27	1	3	0	0	0	0	0	30	1
MF	(England) Neil Webb	0(1)	0	0	0	1	0	2	0	3(1)	0
FW	(France) Eric Cantona	21(1)	9	1	0	0	0	0	0	22(1)	9
FW	(England) Dion Dublin	3(4)	1	0	0	0	0	0	0	3(4)	1
FW	(Wales) Mark Hughes	41	15	2	0	3	1	2	0	48	16
FW	(Scotland) Brian McClair	41(1)	9	3	0	3	0	2	0	49(1)	9
FW	(England) Danny Wallace	0(2)	0	1	0	1	1	2	0	4(2)	1

== Transfers ==
United's first departure of the 1992–93 season was Mal Donaghy, who joined Chelsea on 13 August. The next day, Mark Robins signed for Norwich City for a fee of £800,000. Also on their way out of the club were Republic of Ireland defender Derek Brazil, Northern Irish forward Colin Telford, and English midfielder Neil Webb.

Meanwhile, arriving in the summer were American forward Jovan Kirovski, Northern Irish centre-back Pat McGibbon and English forward Dion Dublin. French forward Eric Cantona joined later on 27 November.

On 19 March, Kieran Toal left United to sign for Motherwell. Raphael Burke was released on 10 April, while Russell Beardsmore joined Bournemouth on 29 June. Adrian Doherty, George Switzer, and Ian Wilkinson left the club a day after Beardsmore's departure.

United's only winter arrival was Les Sealey, who signed from Aston Villa on 6 January.

=== In ===
Date	Pos.	Name	From	Fee
2 July 1992	FW	(United States) Jovan Kirovski	Youth System	Free
1 August 1992	DF	(Northern Ireland) Pat McGibbon	(Northern Ireland) Portadown	£100k
7 August 1992	FW	(England) Dion Dublin	(England) Cambridge United	£1.1m
27 November 1992	FW	(France) Eric Cantona	(England) Leeds United	£1.2m
6 January 1993	GK	(England) Les Sealey	(England) Aston Villa	£650k

=== Out ===
Date	Pos.	Name	To	Fee
13 August 1992	DF	(Northern Ireland) Mal Donaghy	(England) Chelsea	£150k
14 August 1992	FW	(England) Mark Robins	(England) Norwich City	£850k
24 August 1992	DF	(Republic of Ireland) Derek Brazil	(Wales) Cardiff City	£185k
7 September 1992	FW	(Northern Ireland) Colin Telford	(Scotland) Raith Rovers	Free
23 November 1992	MF	(England) Neil Webb	(England) Nottingham Forest	£820k
19 March 1993	MF	(Republic of Ireland) Kieran Toal	(Scotland) Motherwell	£320k
10 April 1993	FW	(England) Raphael Burke	(England) Exeter City	Free
29 June 1993	MF	(England) Russell Beardsmore	(England) Bournemouth	£210k
30 June 1993	FW	(Northern Ireland) Adrian Doherty	(Republic of Ireland) Derry City	Free
30 June 1993	DF	(England) George Switzer	(England) Darlington	Free
30 June 1993	GK	(England) Ian Wilkinson	(England) Stockport County	Free

=== Loan in ===
Date From	Date To	Position	Name	From
5 November 1992	5 December 1992	GK	(England) Fraser Digby	(England) Swindon Town

=== Loan out ===
Date From	Date To	Position	Name	To
August 1992	24 August 1992	DF	(Republic of Ireland) Derek Brazil	(Wales) Cardiff City
8 January 1993	22 January 1993	FW	(Scotland) Colin McKee	(England) Bury
25 March 1993	31 May 1993	FW	(England) Danny Wallace	(England) Millwall

== Events of the season ==
After a shortage of goals in the second half of the previous season had cost United the league title, Alex Ferguson began the hunt to sign a new striker. A name which had been strongly linked with United for months was Alan Shearer, the 21-year-old Southampton and England striker. United's hopes of signing Shearer were given a boost on 7 July when Southampton manager Ian Branfoot announced that Shearer could leave the Hampshire club if the price was right.

While the hunt was on for one striker to join United, another was on his way out of the club. Striker Mark Robins, who had rarely played in 1991–92, was on the transfer list and finally signed for Norwich City, whose new manager Mike Walker paid £800,000 as he looked to build an attack capable of scoring the goals to keep the Canaries in the new FA Premier League. His new team unexpectedly emerged as title contenders in the first season of the new Premier League.

The race to sign Alan Shearer was lost on 23 July, when the player opted for a national record £3.6 million move to newly promoted Blackburn Rovers, managed by Kenny Dalglish and bankrolled by owner Jack Walker, who were looking set to re-establish themselves as a top club in their first top flight campaign since the 1960s.

United did express interest in signing Tottenham Hotspur's Paul Stewart, a versatile player capable of playing in attack and midfield, but the player signed for Liverpool instead.

The hunt to find a new striker ended on 7 August, eight days before the start of the new season, when Dion Dublin signed from Cambridge United for £1 million as United's only close season signing. Dublin, 23, had been one of the most competent goalscorers outside the top flight during the last three seasons as Cambridge soared from the Fourth Division to the brink of the Premier League, though it was clear that he would start off his time at Old Trafford as an understudy to Mark Hughes and Brian McClair.

United's first game of the season was against Sheffield United at Bramall Lane, and was a major disappointment as they lost 2–1 and the South Yorkshire club's striker Brian Deane earned the distinction of scoring the first goal of the new Premier League.

Two days later, 21-year-old winger Lee Sharpe was diagnosed with viral meningitis and was ruled out for over three months.

The first Premier League game at Old Trafford was on 19 August, against Everton, but was a huge disappointment as United lost 3–0 in their second worst home defeat since Alex Ferguson took over as manager in November 1986. United's first point came on 22 August when they drew 1–1 draw at home to newly promoted Ipswich Town.

United's first Premier League win came at the fourth attempt on 24 August, when Dion Dublin scored his first United goal in a 1–0 win at Southampton. The next four games were all won as United climbed to third place by mid September, with Norwich City top of the table and Blackburn Rovers second. One of those games – a 1–0 win at home to Crystal Palace – saw Dublin suffer a broken leg that ruled him out for six months. A five-match run of league draws followed, and during that run of draws came a first hurdle exit from the UEFA Cup at the hands of Russian side Torpedo Moscow, when they lost on penalties after two goalless draws. The first leg at Old Trafford saw the debut of 17-year-old defender Gary Neville.

Later that month, United began their defence of the League Cup with a 1–1 draw at Brighton & Hove Albion in the second round first leg, in which another player – 17-year-old David Beckham – made his debut. United won the return leg 1–0 at Old Trafford but their hopes of retaining the trophy ended on 28 October when they suffered a 1–0 exit to Aston Villa in the third round at Villa Park. Villa, managed by former United boss Ron Atkinson were also emerging as title contenders.

United's run of draws ended on 31 October – in defeat, as they were beaten 1–0 at home by Wimbledon with a goal from Lawrie Sanchez. A week later, United's winless run extended to seven matches when Ron Atkinson's Aston Villa inflicted another defeat on them at Villa Park. United were now 10th in the league, eight points behind leaders Arsenal, and also behind unfashionable sides including Norwich City, Coventry City and Ipswich Town, who had been widely tipped as sides more likely to be battling against relegation rather than challenging for the title.

Ferguson realised that something had to be done if United were to remain in the title race. He made a £3 million bid for Sheffield Wednesday striker David Hirst, but the bid was rejected. He then received an offer from defending champions Leeds United for defender Denis Irwin, but rejected the offer. However, Ferguson did ask manager Howard Wilkinson if he was willing to part company with 26-year-old French striker Eric Cantona. On 26 November, Cantona signed for United in a £1.2 million deal, and slotted into the United attack alongside Mark Hughes, with Brian McClair being drafted into central midfield alongside Paul Ince.

By the time Cantona arrived, United had returned to their winning ways with a 3–0 home win over strugglers Oldham Athletic, in which 17-year-old midfielder Nicky Butt made his debut as a substitute. The winning form continued a week later when a Mark Hughes goal gave United a 1–0 win at Highbury.

A week after the win at Highbury, the Manchester derby at Old Trafford ended in a 2–1 win for United in a game where Eric Cantona made his debut. His first goal for the club came on 19 December in a 1–1 draw against Chelsea at Stamford Bridge. By now, United were on an upswing in the league and narrowing the gap between themselves and the top of the table.

In the league game against Sheffield Wednesday at Hillsborough on Boxing Day, United fought back to draw 3–3 (after being 3–0 down at half time) with Brian McClair scoring twice and Eric Cantona once. They had now climbed up to third place in the table, five points behind leaders Norwich City and two points behind second placed Blackburn Rovers.

The resurgence continued into the new year and United's unbeaten run ended at the end of that month as they lost 2–1 to Ipswich Town, while United stood second when a draw would have been enough to put them ahead of Ipswich's East Anglian rivals Norwich City. January had also seen United dispose of Bury and then Brighton & Hove Albion in the FA Cup, although the league title remained the number one priority.

However, the FA Cup quest ended on 14 February when Steve Bruce missed a penalty as United 2–1 at Sheffield United in the FA Cup fifth round, ending their double hopes, though it freed them up to concentrate on the league. They finally went top on 6 March with a 2–1 win at Anfield over a Liverpool side who were now 15th in the table and just three points above the relegation zone, though this result was arguably the catalyst for United's fierce north western rivals who then turned their season around to climb to sixth place in the final table.

However, a four match winless run (a defeat and three draws) then dragged United down to third place as Norwich City and Aston Villa gained a slim lead over them by the end of March. United then dealt a major blow to Norwich's title hopes on 5 April with a 3–1 win over them at Carrow Road, before two injury time goals from Steve Bruce inspired a 2–1 win over Sheffield Wednesday at Old Trafford five days later to return United to the top of the table. United's final six games all ended in victory, with Aston Villa's surprise 1–0 home defeat to Oldham Athletic on 2 May meaning that United were now out of reach at the top of the league and the 26-year wait was over.

The next day, United won 3–1 at home against fourth placed Blackburn Rovers, whose title challenge had faded away after Alan Shearer was ruled out for the second half of the season with a knee injury.

The campaign ended at Selhurst Park on 9 May when United won 2–1 against Wimbledon, in a game where Bryan Robson scored his first goal in 18 months. Robson, now 36, was now United's longest serving player with 12 years of unbroken service (though Mark Hughes had begun his career at Old Trafford a year earlier he did have two seasons away from the club at FC Barcelona and then Bayern Munich) but his days were looking numbered as it became clear that a younger central midfield partner was needed for Paul Ince. By the end of May, a name strongly linked to United was the 21-year-old Nottingham Forest and Republic of Ireland midfielder Roy Keane. However, Alex Ferguson faced competition from Arsenal and Blackburn Rovers for Keane's signature. The deal was finally done on 22 July, when Keane completed his move to United for an English record fee of £3.75 million.
