= 1991–92 Manchester United F.C. season =

English football club season

Manchester United
1991–92 season
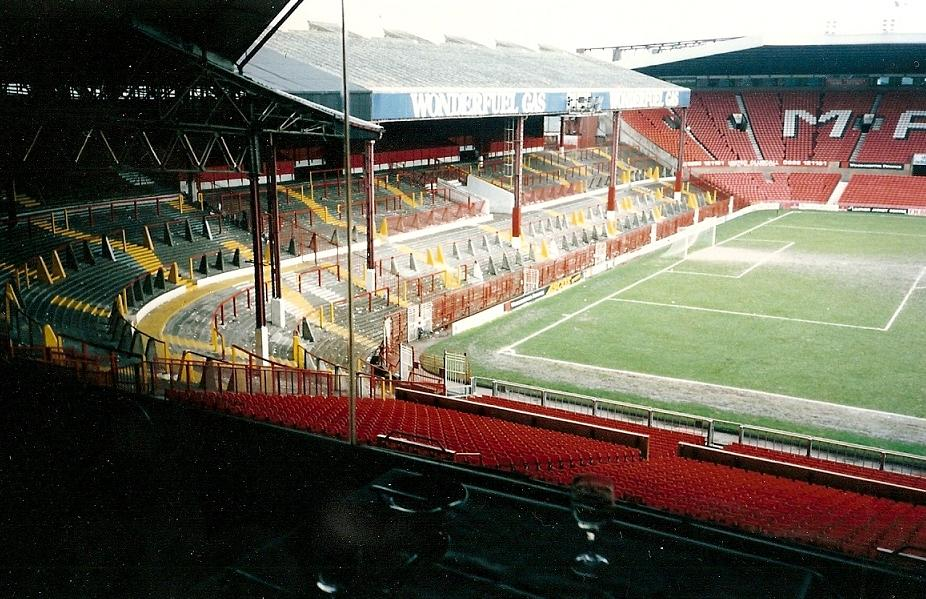
- The Stretford End, March 1992
- Chairman: Martin Edwards
- Manager: Alex Ferguson
- First Division: 2nd
- FA Cup: Fourth round
- League Cup: Winners
- Cup Winners' Cup: Second round
- European Super Cup: Winners
- Top goalscorer: League: Brian McClair (18); All: Brian McClair (25)
- Highest home attendance: 47,576 vs Nottingham Forest (20 April 1992)
- Lowest home attendance: 22,110 vs Red Star Belgrade (19 November 1991)
- Average home league attendance: 44,985
Home colours	Away colours	Third colours

The 1991–92 season was Manchester United's 90th season in the Football League, and their 17th consecutive season in the top division of English football.

The season saw United lift the League Cup for the first time in their history with a 1–0 win over Nottingham Forest at Wembley Stadium. They also added the European Super Cup to the trophy cabinet with victory over Red Star Belgrade at Old Trafford. However, they then endured the disappointment of being beaten to the league title by rivals Leeds United, having led the league for much of the season.

New signings for the season included Danish goalkeeper Peter Schmeichel and England right-back Paul Parker. Ryan Giggs, who had played twice for United in 1990–91, broke into the first team and was one of the most exciting players in the country as he won the PFA Young Player of the Year award.

Soviet international winger Andrei Kanchelskis, who had joined United in the later stages of the 1990–91 season, was also putting in star performances to give manager Alex Ferguson a more attacking alternative to the ageing Mike Phelan on the right hand side of midfield.

It was the final season at Old Trafford for striker Mark Robins, a key player from the FA Cup winning team two seasons earlier. His first team opportunities were limited due to the form of Mark Hughes and Brian McClair, and he was unfit when injuries opened up an opportunity for regular action in attack near the season's end. He was then put on the transfer list and by the start of the following season, he had been sold to Norwich City. Lee Martin had regained fitness following his back injury the previous season, but was unable to win a place in the team. Danny Wallace, who was by now rarely selected for the first team, was put on the transfer list before Christmas, but was still at Old Trafford when the season ended, despite talk of a return to Southampton. Russell Beardsmore, now a rare sight in the first team, had a brief loan spell at Blackburn Rovers.

Media reports for most of the season linked United with a move for Southampton striker Alan Shearer, but the player opted to remain at the South Coast club until the end of the season before making a decision on a future.

United would be among the founder members of the FA Premier League for the 1992–93 season, as the top 22 clubs broke away from the Football League.

== Pre-season and friendlies ==
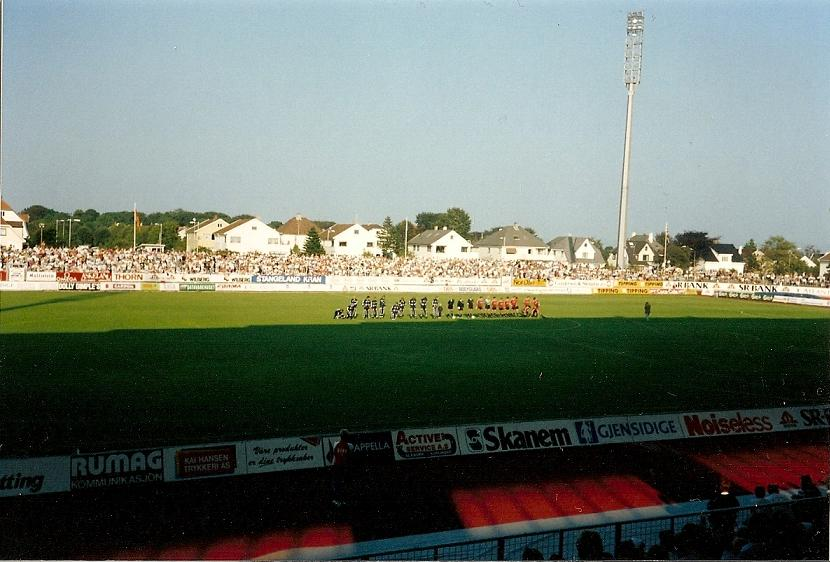
Teams lining out for the preseason game against Viking FK

Date	Opponents	H / A	Result F–A	Scorers	Attendance
24 July 1991	Mazda	H	1–2	Ferguson	
29 July 1991	Strømsgodset	A	3–1	Ince, Beardsmore, Wallace	7,809
30 July 1991	Viking	A	1–0	Robins	6,025
1 August 1991	Molde	A	3–1	Blackmore, Hughes (2)	3,468
4 August 1991	Dumbarton	A	5–0	Robins (2), Hughes (2), McClair	1,570
5 August 1991	Aberdeen	A	1–1 (4–3p)	Hughes	20,300
7 August 1991	Austria Memphis	A	1–5	McClair	12,000
11 August 1991	Republic of Ireland XI	H	1–1	Robson	33,412
3 May 1992	Everton	H	2–4	Ince, Hughes	7,434
8 May 1992	Manchester City	A	2–1	Bruce (pen.), Toal	4,696

== First Division ==
Date	Opponents	H / A	Result F–A	Scorers	Attendance	League position
17 August 1991	Notts County	H	2–0	Hughes 40', Robson 57'	46,278	1st
21 August 1991	Aston Villa	A	1–0	Bruce 38' (pen.)	39,995	1st
24 August 1991	Everton	A	0–0		36,085	2nd
28 August 1991	Oldham Athletic	H	1–0	McClair 85'	42,078	1st
31 August 1991	Leeds United	H	1–1	Robson 85'	43,778	1st
3 September 1991	Wimbledon	A	2–1	Blackmore 25', Pallister 43'	13,824	1st
7 September 1991	Norwich City	H	3–0	Irwin 20', McClair 23', Giggs 28'	44,946	1st
14 September 1991	Southampton	A	1–0	Hughes 48'	19,264	1st
21 September 1991	Luton Town	H	5–0	Ince 23', Bruce 63' (pen.), McClair (2) 76', 80', Hughes 87'	46,491	1st
28 September 1991	Tottenham Hotspur	A	2–1	Hughes 21', Robson 86'	35,087	1st
6 October 1991	Liverpool	H	0–0		44,997	1st
19 October 1991	Arsenal	H	1–1	Bruce 44'	46,594	1st
26 October 1991	Sheffield Wednesday	A	2–3	McClair (2) 17', 22'	38,260	2nd
2 November 1991	Sheffield United	H	2–0	Hoyland 35' (o.g.), Kanchelskis 78'	42,942	1st
16 November 1991	Manchester City	A	0–0		38,180	2nd
23 November 1991	West Ham United	H	2–1	Giggs 15', Robson 42'	47,185	1st
30 November 1991	Crystal Palace	A	3–1	Webb 26', McClair 57', Kanchelskis 58'	29,017	2nd
7 December 1991	Coventry City	H	4–0	Bruce 13', Webb 20', McClair 27', Hughes 81'	42,549	2nd
15 December 1991	Chelsea	A	3–1	Irwin 19', McClair 57', Bruce 61'	23,120	1st
26 December 1991	Oldham Athletic	A	6–3	Irwin (2) 2', 54', Kanchelskis 43', McClair (2) 56', 59', Giggs 78'	18,947	1st
29 December 1991	Leeds United	A	1–1	Webb 46'	32,638	1st
1 January 1992	Queens Park Rangers	H	1–4	McClair 83'	38,554	2nd
11 January 1992	Everton	H	1–0	Kanchelskis 56'	46,619	1st
18 January 1992	Notts County	A	1–1	Blackmore 70' (pen.)	21,055	2nd
22 January 1992	Aston Villa	H	1–0	Hughes 48'	45,022	1st
1 February 1992	Arsenal	A	1–1	McClair 27'	41,703	2nd
8 February 1992	Sheffield Wednesday	H	1–1	McClair 12'	47,074	1st
22 February 1992	Crystal Palace	H	2–0	Hughes (2) 11', 51'	46,347	1st
26 February 1992	Chelsea	H	1–1	Hughes 87'	44,872	1st
29 February 1992	Coventry City	A	0–0		23,967	1st
14 March 1992	Sheffield United	A	2–1	McClair 62', Blackmore 82'	30,183	2nd
18 March 1992	Nottingham Forest	A	0–1		28,062	2nd
21 March 1992	Wimbledon	H	0–0		45,428	2nd
28 March 1992	Queens Park Rangers	A	0–0		22,603	2nd
31 March 1992	Norwich City	A	3–1	Ince (2) 41', 58', McClair 66'	17,489	1st
7 April 1992	Manchester City	H	1–1	Giggs 20'	46,781	1st
16 April 1992	Southampton	H	1–0	Kanchelskis 65'	43,972	1st
18 April 1992	Luton Town	A	1–1	Sharpe 25'	13,410	1st
20 April 1992	Nottingham Forest	H	1–2	McClair 36'	47,576	2nd
22 April 1992	West Ham United	A	0–1		24,197	2nd
26 April 1992	Liverpool	A	0–2		38,669	2nd
2 May 1992	Tottenham Hotspur	H	3–1	McClair 37', Hughes (2) 57', 59'	44,595	2nd

Pos	Team	Pld	W	D	L	GF	GA	GD	Pts	Qualification or relegation
1	Leeds United (C)	42	22	16	4	74	37	+37	82	Qualification for the UEFA Champions League first round and qualification for the FA Premier League
2	Manchester United	42	21	15	6	63	33	+30	78	Qualification for the UEFA Cup first round and qualification for the FA Premier League (Note: Manchester United also won the League Cup – that UEFA Cup qualifying place was passed down to the third-placed League team.)
3	Sheffield Wednesday	42	21	12	9	62	49	+13	75	Qualification for the UEFA Cup first round and qualification for the FA Premier League
4	Arsenal	42	19	15	8	81	46	+35	72	Qualification for the FA Premier League
5	Manchester City	42	20	10	12	61	48	+13	70	Qualification for the FA Premier League

Source: World Football
Rules for classification: 1) Points; 2) Goal difference; 3) Goals scored
(C) Champions

== FA Cup ==
Date	Round	Opponents	H / A	Result F–A	Scorers	Attendance
15 January 1992	Round 3	Leeds United	A	1–0	Hughes 44'	31,819
27 January 1992	Round 4	Southampton	A	0–0		19,506
5 February 1992	Round 4 Replay	Southampton	H	2–2 (a.e.t.) (2–4p)	Kanchelskis 42', McClair 90'	33,414

== League Cup ==
Date	Round	Opponents	H / A	Result F–A	Scorers	Attendance
25 September 1991	Round 2 First leg	Cambridge United	H	3–0	Giggs 44', McClair 48', Bruce 66'	30,934
9 October 1991	Round 2 Second leg	Cambridge United	A	1–1	McClair 2'	9,248
30 October 1991	Round 3	Portsmouth	H	3–1	Robins (2) 59', 89', Robson 74'	29,543
4 December 1991	Round 4	Oldham Athletic	H	2–0	McClair 1', Kanchelskis 25'	38,550
8 January 1992	Round 5	Leeds United	A	3–1	Blackmore 31', Kanchelskis 51', Giggs 56'	28,886
4 March 1992	Semi-final; First leg	Middlesbrough	A	0–0		25,572
11 March 1992	Semi-final; Second leg	Middlesbrough	H	2–1 (a.e.t.)	Sharpe 29', Giggs 106'	45,875
12 April 1992	Final	Nottingham Forest	N	1–0	McClair 14'	76,810

== Cup Winners' Cup ==
Date	Round	Opponents	H / A	Result F–A	Scorers	Attendance
18 September 1991	First round First leg	Athinaikos	A	0–0		5,400
2 October 1991	First round Second leg	Athinaikos	H	2–0 (a.e.t.)	Hughes 109', McClair 111'	35,023
23 October 1991	Second round First leg	Atlético Madrid	A	0–3		40,000
6 November 1991	Second round Second leg	Atlético Madrid	H	1–1	Hughes 4'	39,654

== European Super Cup ==
Date	Opponents	H / A	Result F–A	Scorers	Attendance
19 November 1991	Red Star Belgrade	H	1–0	McClair 67'	22,110

== Squad statistics ==
Pos.	Name	League		FA Cup		Rumbelows Cup		Europe		Other		Total	
Pos.	Name	Apps	Goals	Apps	Goals	Apps	Goals	Apps	Goals	Apps	Goals	Apps	Goals
GK	(Denmark) Peter Schmeichel	40	0	3	0	6	0	3	0	1	0	53	0
GK	(England) Gary Walsh	2	0	0	0	1	0	1	0	0	0	4	0
GK	(England) Ian Wilkinson	0	0	0	0	1	0	0	0	0	0	1	0
DF	(Wales) Clayton Blackmore	19(14)	3	1	0	4(1)	1	1	0	1	0	26(15)	4
DF	(England) Steve Bruce	37	5	1	0	7	1	4	0	1	0	50	6
DF	(Northern Ireland) Mal Donaghy	16(4)	0	2	0	3(1)	0	0	0	0	0	21(5)	0
DF	(Republic of Ireland) Denis Irwin	37(1)	4	3	0	7	0	2	0	1	0	50(1)	4
DF	(England) Lee Martin	0(1)	0	0	0	1	0	1(2)	0	1	0	3(3)	0
DF	(England) Gary Pallister	37(3)	1	3	0	8	0	3(1)	0	1	0	52(4)	1
DF	(England) Paul Parker	24(2)	0	3	0	6	0	2	0	0	0	35(2)	0
MF	(England) Russell Beardsmore	0	0	0	0	0	0	1(2)	0	0	0	1(2)	0
MF	(Scotland) Darren Ferguson	2(2)	0	0	0	0	0	0	0	0	0	2(2)	0
MF	(Wales) Ryan Giggs	32(6)	4	2(1)	0	6(2)	3	1	0	0(1)	0	41(10)	7
MF	(England) Paul Ince	31(2)	3	3	0	6(1)	0	3	0	1	0	44(3)	3
MF	(Commonwealth of Independent States) Andrei Kanchelskis	28(6)	5	2	1	4	2	1	0	1	0	36(6)	8
MF	(England) Mike Phelan	14(4)	0	0	0	2(1)	0	4	0	0	0	20(5)	0
MF	(England) Bryan Robson	26(1)	4	2	0	5(1)	1	3	0	0	0	36(2)	5
MF	(England) Lee Sharpe	8(6)	1	0(1)	0	1(3)	1	0	0	0	0	9(10)	2
MF	(England) Neil Webb	29(2)	3	3	0	6	0	3	0	1	0	42(2)	3
FW	(Wales) Mark Hughes	38(1)	11	2(1)	1	6	0	4	2	1	0	51(2)	14
FW	(Scotland) Brian McClair	41(1)	18	3	1	8	4	4	1	1	1	57(1)	25
FW	(England) Mark Robins	1(1)	0	0	0	0(3)	2	2(1)	0	0	0	3(5)	2
FW	(England) Danny Wallace	0	0	0	0	0	0	1(1)	0	0	0	1(1)	0

== Transfers ==
=== In ===
Date	Pos.	Name	From	Fee
6 August 1991	DF	(England) Paul Parker	(England) Queens Park Rangers	£1.7m
6 August 1991	GK	(Denmark) Peter Schmeichel	(Denmark) Brøndby	£625k

=== Out ===
Date	Pos.	Name	To	Fee
5 August 1991	FW	(Wales) Deiniol Graham	(England) Barnsley	£50k
6 February 1992	GK	(Scotland) Jim Leighton	(Scotland) Dundee	£200k
19 March 1992	DF	(England) Jason Lydiate	(England) Bolton Wanderers	Undisclosed
30 June 1992	MF	(England) Mark Gordon	Released	Free
30 June 1992	MF	(England) Paul Gough	Released	Free
30 June 1992	FW	(England) Andy Noone	Released	Free
30 June 1992	MF	(England) Paul Sixsmith	(England) Preston North End	Undisclosed
30 June 1992	MF	(Northern Ireland) Peter Smyth	Released	Free
30 June 1992	DF	(England) Leonard Taylor	Released	Free
30 June 1992	MF	(England) Paul Wratten	(England) Hartlepool United	Undisclosed

=== Loan in ===
Date from	Date to	Position	Name	From
1 March 1992	1 May 1992	MF	(England) Andy Arnott	(England) Gillingham

=== Loan out ===
Date from	Date to	Position	Name	To
12 September 1991	12 December 1991	DF	(Republic of Ireland) Derek Brazil	(Wales) Swansea City
29 November 1991	29 February 1992	GK	(Scotland) Jim Leighton	(England) Reading
19 December 1991	19 January 1992	MF	(England) Russell Beardsmore	(England) Blackburn Rovers
24 December 1991	10 April 1992	DF	(Republic of Ireland) Brian Carey	(Wales) Wrexham
16 January 1992	21 February 1992	DF	(England) Neil Whitworth	(England) Preston North End
21 February 1992	10 April 1992	DF	(England) Neil Whitworth	(England) Barnsley

== Events of the season ==
Five years after becoming manager of Manchester United, Alex Ferguson enjoyed success at the club. In 1990, he ended his fourth season in charge with the FA Cup that ended the club's five-year trophy drought, and followed it up a year later with the European Cup Winners' Cup title. He then attempted to win the league title that had not been United's since 1967, when Matt Busby had been manager and the likes of Bobby Charlton, Denis Law and George Best were in the team.

Ferguson made two major signings in the close season. He boosted his defence with a £1.75 million move for Queens Park Rangers and England right-back Paul Parker, with the previous season's first choice right-back Denis Irwin being switched to left-back – the position that Clayton Blackmore and Lee Martin had spent the last couple of seasons competing for.

With Les Sealey and Mark Bosnich gone, Jim Leighton almost a forgotten man after just one appearance the previous season, and Gary Walsh seemingly not good enough to be first choice goalkeeper, Ferguson paid £500,000 for Brøndby and Denmark goalkeeper Peter Schmeichel. He now had a squad that few if any clubs in the First Division could match. As well as having established stars like Steve Bruce, Gary Pallister, Bryan Robson and Mark Hughes at his disposal, there was plenty of young talent on the way up at Old Trafford. 20-year-old winger Lee Sharpe's impressive displays in 1990–91 had earned him the PFA Young Player of the Year award, and there was much hype surrounding 17-year-old winger Ryan Giggs, who had made his debut the previous season and scored in only his second senior game. When Giggs turned professional the previous November, he was billed as the next George Best, though it still seemed that it would be a while before he would become a first team regular.

On 11 August, Sir Matt Busby, 82-year-old club president and former team manager, earned around £250,000 in gate receipts from his testimonial in which Manchester United drew 1–1 with a Republic of Ireland XI at Old Trafford.

Six days later, Manchester United began their league campaign with a 2–0 home win over newly promoted Notts County in the First Division. By 7 September, they had opened up a four-point lead over Leeds United at the top of the First Division by winning 3–0 against Norwich City at Old Trafford.

Later that month, they began their defence of the Cup Winners' Cup with a 0–0 draw with Athinaikos in Greece in the first round first leg. There were ugly scenes on the night of the game, leading to five Manchester United supporters receiving £1,500 fines and seven-month prison sentences for their involvement in a Greek bar brawl.

Before the end of September, they began their quest for Football League Cup glory with a 3–0 home win over Cambridge United in the second round first leg.

The following week, they progressed to the next stage of the Cup Winners' Cup with a 2–0 win over Athinaikos in the first round second leg at Old Trafford, four days before a goalless draw with Liverpool at Old Trafford, in which United's Mark Hughes and Liverpool's Gary Ablett were both sent off.

On 23 October, Manchester United's hopes of retaining the Cup Winners' Cup received a massive blow when they lost 3–0 to Spanish club Atlético Madrid in the second round first leg.

Before the month had ended, they ensured that their League Cup quest remained alive by beating Portsmouth 3–1 in the third round at Old Trafford. Mark Robins, the striker whose first team chances were becoming increasingly limited due to the strength of the Hughes–McClair partnership, scored twice in the game. By this stage of the season, however, the United player attracting the most attention was Ryan Giggs, still not quite 18 but now United's first choice left winger and the youngest Wales international to date.

On 6 November, United's defence of the Cup Winners' Cup ended when they could only manage a 1–1 draw at home to Atletico Madrid, meaning that they suffered a 4–1 aggregate defeat. Consolation came from the fact that they remained unbeaten at home in European competitions 35 years after first competing. This was the club's last Cup Winners' Cup match, as they never returned to the competition until it was abolished in 1999.

There was still European glory for United this season, though with a less significant trophy than before, when on 19 November they clinched the European Super Cup with a 1–0 win over European Cup winners Red Star Belgrade at Old Trafford. The only goal of the game came from Brian McClair.

With Hughes and McClair both now 28 and their long-term future as a top striker partnership looking doubtful, rumours began to circulate in early December that Alex Ferguson was going to bring Southampton's 21-year-old striker Alan Shearer to Old Trafford. Newcastle-born Shearer had been the centre of much speculation and hope since scoring a hat-trick on his Football League debut nearly four years ago at the age of 17, and in 1991–92 had established himself as a regular goalscorer.

Boxing Day was a dramatic day for United, who triumphed 6–3 against local rivals and relegation battlers Oldham Athletic at Boundary Park. Denis Irwin and Brian McClair both scored twice, with the other goals coming from Ryan Giggs and Andrei Kanchelskis, helping United maintain their lead at the top of the league. Three days later, they drew 1–1 with their nearest title contenders Leeds United at Elland Road. However, New Year's Day brought one of United's worst home results ever when they were crushed 4–1 at Old Trafford by Queen's Park Rangers, in a game which also brought them their first home defeat of the season.

United's FA Cup quest began on 15 January when they faced Leeds United at Elland Road, with both teams fighting it out to cancel the other out of the Double race. The game ended in a 1–0 win for Manchester United, with Mark Hughes scoring the only goal of the game. 12 days later, United travelled to the south coast to take on Southampton in the FA Cup fourth round. The game ended in a goalless draw, and was replayed the following week at Old Trafford. The replay ended in a 2–2 draw, with Bryan Robson being denied a goal which would have won the game for United. With the scores still level at the end of extra time, the match went to penalties. Penalty misses from Ryan Giggs and Neil Webb ended their hopes of a unique domestic treble and left them with just the league title and League Cup to challenge for.

On the day of the cup exit, United were saddened to hear of the death of Alan Davies, a member of their FA Cup winning squad from nine years earlier, who had committed suicide in South Wales.

The next day, out of favour goalkeeper Jim Leighton headed out of the Old Trafford exit door in a £250,000 move to Dundee, 16 months after making his final United appearance.

At the end of March, by which time United had slowed down in the league and were being pushed hard by Leeds United, defender Gary Pallister was voted PFA Player of the Year, while 18-year-old winger Ryan Giggs was voted PFA Young Player of the Year.

12 April 1992 saw Manchester United win the Football League Cup for the first time in their history with a 1–0 win over Nottingham Forest in the final at Wembley Stadium, in which Brian McClair scored the only goal of the game. It ensured that Peter Schmeichel, Paul Parker, Andrei Kanchelskis and Ryan Giggs gained the first major honours of their English league careers, as well as ensuring United silverware for the third season running.

Eight days later, however, the highest Football League audience of the season saw Manchester United lose 2–1 to Nottingham Forest at home, a result which made winning the title look like an uphill task following a recent downturn in form which saw Leeds United emerge as the stronger side in what had been a two-horse title race for most of the season. However, the team from Yorkshire were a point ahead, and had played a game more. There was still a chance.

That chance came on 22 April, when United travelled to East London to take on a West Ham United side heading for relegation. They had high hopes for the game, only to lose 1–0, a result that left them needing to beat Liverpool at Anfield four days later to stay in the title race.

On 26 April, United lost 2–0 to Liverpool and the title went to a Leeds United side who defeated Sheffield United 3–2. The key player in the West Yorkshire club's title glory was Gordon Strachan, who had been sold to them from Manchester United just three years earlier and on his transfer had spoken of his hope that he would soon be able to get his new club promoted to the top flight when his old club were league champions.

After the season ended, Alex Ferguson began his quest to sign a striker in order to address the lack of goals which had cost United the title. One player high on his wish list was Alan Shearer, who had been linked with a move to the club from Southampton since before Christmas, but had decided to wait until the end of the season before deciding on where his future lay.

He also had plenty of strength in reserve as a crop of young players won the FA Youth Cup.

The last game of the season was the last ever in front of the Stretford End terraces, it would be knocked down during the Summer and rebuilt as a modern single tiered stand by the start of the 1993–94 season, and a second tier was consequently added in 2001.
