= 1989–90 Manchester United F.C. season =

English football club season

Manchester United
1989–90 season
- Chairman: Martin Edwards
- Manager: Alex Ferguson
- First Division: 13th
- FA Cup: Winners
- League Cup: Third round
- Top goalscorer: League: Mark Hughes (13); All: Mark Hughes (15)
- Highest home attendance: 47,245 vs Arsenal (19 August 1989)
- Lowest home attendance: 26,698 vs Portsmouth (3 October 1989)
- Average home league attendance: 39,078
Home colours	Away colours	Third colours

The 1989–90 season was Manchester United's 88th season in the Football League, and their 15th consecutive season in the top division of English football.

The season brought their lowest league finish since their relegation from the First Division 15 years earlier, as they finished 13th in the league, and by Christmas there were continued calls from fans for Alex Ferguson to be sacked as manager. However, the season ended on a high as United won the FA Cup by beating Crystal Palace 1–0 in a replay after drawing the first game 3–3. It was their first major trophy for five years, and their first since the appointment of Alex Ferguson as manager.

It also saw them enter European competition as England's representatives in the 1990–91 European Cup Winners' Cup following the end of the ban on English clubs in European competition arising from the Heysel Stadium disaster of 1985.

1989–90 saw Mark Hughes top the club's goalscoring charts for the second year running, while the club welcomed four new major signings in the early part of the season – Danny Wallace, Neil Webb, Paul Ince and Gary Pallister.

Young striker Mark Robins enjoyed regular appearances in the first team this season, often as a substitute, and scored 10 goals - including the winning goal against Nottingham Forest in the third round of the FA Cup. Lee Martin, who scored the winning goal in the FA Cup final replay, became the club's regular left-back this season.

This season also saw the attempted purchase of the club by businessman Michael Knighton after chairman Martin Edwards considered selling the club for a reported £10 million. The sale fell through after Knighton was found to not have the money required to maintain the club. This period is best remembered for Knighton – wearing a United kit and tracksuit top – performing a keepie uppie routine before the opening game of the season at home to Arsenal. According to Alex Ferguson in his autobiography; Managing My Life (published nearly a decade later), this display of showboating annoyed Ferguson as he felt it was detrimental to his teams' preparation for the forthcoming match – although United did go on to win the game 4–1 against the defending champions.

Ferguson also revealed in the autobiography that in spite of Manchester United's dismal form during the first half of the season, he was assured by the club's directors that his position as manager was never at risk; although naturally disappointed with the club's lack of progress in the league, they understood the reason for this - namely that a number of key players, including Neil Webb, were unavailable for long spells due to injury. However, Ferguson also admitted in his autobiography that had he not achieved success with United that season, he feared that fan and media pressure on the club's board to sack him could eventually have become irresistible. There had been numerous calls from fans during the season for Ferguson to be sacked, and media reports had suggested that the former Everton manager Howard Kendall would be appointed as his successor; Kendall was appointed by United's local rivals Manchester City during the season. Similarly, there were also reports that Knighton wanted to recruit England manager Bobby Robson, who had announced his intention to stand down after the 1990 FIFA World Cup; the collapse of Knighton’s takeover rendered this moot, and Robson instead became manager of PSV Eindhoven after the World Cup.

== Pre-season and friendlies ==
Date	Opponents	H / A	Result F–A	Scorers	Attendance
30 July 1989	Thailand National XI	A	1–1 (4–2p)	Robson	12,000
2 August 1989	Everton	N	1–3	Webb	8,000
7 August 1989	Japan National XI	A	1–0	Robins	40,000
11 August 1989	Bristol City	A	3–2	McClair, Webb, Beardsmore	9,799
13 August 1989	Manchester City	H	0–2		19,958
12 September 1989	Torquay United	A	1–0	Duxbury	4,108
26 September 1989	Hearts	A	4–2	Wallace, Blackmore (2), McClair	9,001
17 October 1989	St Johnstone	A	1–0	McClair	9,788

== First Division ==
Date	Opponents	H / A	Result F–A	Scorers	Attendance	League position
19 August 1989	Arsenal	H	4–1	Bruce 2', Hughes 63', Webb 79', McClair 83'	47,245	1st
22 August 1989	Crystal Palace	A	1–1	Robson 19'	22,423	1st
26 August 1989	Derby County	A	0–2		22,175	9th
30 August 1989	Norwich City	H	0–2		41,610	14th
9 September 1989	Everton	A	2–3	McClair 57', Beardsmore 66'	37,916	16th
16 September 1989	Millwall	H	5–1	Hughes (3) 13', 75', 85', Robson 43', Sharpe 60'	42,746	11th
23 September 1989	Manchester City	A	1–5	Hughes 50'	43,246	14th
14 October 1989	Sheffield Wednesday	H	0–0		41,492	17th
21 October 1989	Coventry City	A	4–1	Bruce 5', Hughes (2) 29', 69', Phelan 65'	19,625	14th
28 October 1989	Southampton	H	2–1	McClair (2) 16', 61'	37,122	11th
4 November 1989	Charlton Athletic	A	0–2		16,065	13th
12 November 1989	Nottingham Forest	H	1–0	Pallister 45+1'	34,182	11th
18 November 1989	Luton Town	A	3–1	Wallace 5', Blackmore 28', Hughes 76'	11,141	9th
25 November 1989	Chelsea	H	0–0		46,975	10th
3 December 1989	Arsenal	A	0–1		34,484	12th
9 December 1989	Crystal Palace	H	1–2	Beardsmore 9'	33,514	12th
16 December 1989	Tottenham Hotspur	H	0–1		36,230	13th
23 December 1989	Liverpool	A	0–0		37,426	12th
26 December 1989	Aston Villa	A	0–3		41,247	15th
30 December 1989	Wimbledon	A	2–2	Hughes 74', Robins 75'	9,622	15th
1 January 1990	Queens Park Rangers	H	0–0		34,824	15th
13 January 1990	Derby County	H	1–2	Pallister 48'	38,985	15th
21 January 1990	Norwich City	A	0–2		17,370	17th
3 February 1990	Manchester City	H	1–1	Blackmore 70'	40,274	17th
10 February 1990	Millwall	A	2–1	Wallace 65', Hughes 84'	15,491	15th
24 February 1990	Chelsea	A	0–1		29,979	16th
3 March 1990	Luton Town	H	4–1	McClair 25', Hughes 33', Wallace 44', Robins 66'	35,327	16th
14 March 1990	Everton	H	0–0		37,398	16th
18 March 1990	Liverpool	H	1–2	Whelan 80' (o.g.)	46,629	16th
21 March 1990	Sheffield Wednesday	A	0–1		33,260	16th
24 March 1990	Southampton	A	2–0	Gibson 66', Robins 88'	20,510	16th
31 March 1990	Coventry City	H	3–0	Hughes (2) 27', 36', Robins 87'	39,172	16th
14 April 1990	Queens Park Rangers	A	2–1	Robins 68', Webb 74'	18,997	14th
17 April 1990	Aston Villa	H	2–0	Robins (2) 24', 45'	44,080	13th
21 April 1990	Tottenham Hotspur	A	1–2	Bruce 68' (pen.)	33,317	14th
30 April 1990	Wimbledon	H	0–0		29,281	15th
2 May 1990	Nottingham Forest	A	0–4		21,186	16th
5 May 1990	Charlton Athletic	H	1–0	Pallister 36'	35,389	13th

Pos	Team	Pld	W	D	L	GF	GA	GD	Pts	Qualification or relegation
11	Queens Park Rangers	38	13	11	14	45	44	+1	50	
12	Coventry City	38	14	7	17	39	59	−20	49	
13	Manchester United	38	13	9	16	46	47	−1	48	Qualification for the European Cup Winners' Cup first round (Note: Manchester United qualified for the UEFA Cup Winners' Cup as the 1989–90 FA Cup winners.)
14	Manchester City	38	12	12	14	43	52	−9	48	
15	Crystal Palace	38	13	9	16	42	66	−24	48	

Source: World Football
Rules for classification: 1) Points; 2) Goal difference; 3) Goals scored

== FA Cup ==
Date	Round	Opponents	H / A	Result F–A	Scorers	Attendance
7 January 1990	Round 3	Nottingham Forest	A	1–0	Robins 56'	23,072
28 January 1990	Round 4	Hereford United	A	1–0	Blackmore 86'	13,777
18 February 1990	Round 5	Newcastle United	A	3–2	Robins 19', Wallace 60', McClair 77'	31,748
11 March 1990	Round 6	Sheffield United	A	1–0	McClair 29'	34,344
8 April 1990	Semi-final	Oldham Athletic	N	3–3 (a.e.t.)	Robson 29', Webb 72', Wallace 92'	44,026
11 April 1990	Semi-final; Replay	Oldham Athletic	N	2–1 (a.e.t.)	McClair 50', Robins 114'	35,005
12 May 1990	Final	Crystal Palace	N	3–3 (a.e.t.)	Robson 35', Hughes (2) 62', 113'	80,000
17 May 1990	Final; Replay	Crystal Palace	N	1–0	Martin 59'	80,000

== League Cup ==
Date	Round	Opponents	H / A	Result F–A	Scorers	Attendance
20 September 1989	Round 2 First leg	Portsmouth	A	3–2	Ince (2) 19', 41', Wallace 44'	18,072
3 October 1989	Round 2 Second leg	Portsmouth	H	0–0		26,698
25 October 1989	Round 3	Tottenham Hotspur	H	0–3		45,759

== Events of the season ==
Alex Ferguson began his fourth season as Manchester United manager desperate to bring a major trophy–and ultimately the league title–to Old Trafford for the first time in his reign. During the close season, he brought in Mike Phelan signs from Norwich City for £750,000 and Neil Webb from Nottingham Forest for £1.5 million, rebuilding his midfield following the sale of Gordon Strachan to Leeds United for £300,000 and midfielder Norman Whiteside to Everton for £750,000. Paul McGrath was sold to Aston Villa for £400,000, with Ferguson making an approach for Swedish defender Glenn Hysen, but lost out to Liverpool. By the end of the first month of the season, he had brought in Middlesbrough defender Gary Pallister for a club record fee of £2.3 million–also a national record for a defender and the second highest fee to be paid by an English club. Ferguson then signed Paul Ince, the 21-year-old West Ham United midfielder, for £1.7 million after a long wait that resulted from a failed medical.

Just 48 hours before the First Division campaign kicked off, Martin Edwards was reportedly on the verge of selling control of Manchester United for a deal in the region of £20 million, nine years after he inherited control of the club from his late father Louis. The next day, Michael Knighton, a 37-year-old property developer, agreed a takeover deal for the club.

The First Division season began with an excellent 4–1 home win over defending champions Arsenal. The goals come from Steve Bruce, Mark Hughes, Brian McClair and the debutant Neil Webb, raising hopes that 1989–90 could finally be the season where the league title returned to United.

However, by 9 September, United had lost three league games in a row and unrest was growing among the fans, prompting rumours that Ferguson could be on the verge of dismissal. Some reports even suggested that the former Everton manager Howard Kendall was about to be appointed as manager of Manchester United, but the board denied that Ferguson's position was at risk. By Christmas, Kendall was indeed in Manchester, but as manager of City rather than United.

On 16 September, Danny Wallace moved to Manchester United for £1.2 million, giving United a much needed boost on the left wing following the dismal form of Ralph Milne, who was signed last year, and a more experienced alternative to the 18-year-old Lee Sharpe.

Five days after Wallace's arrival, Martin Edwards agreed to sell his controlling interest in Manchester United to Michael Knighton for £20 million.

23 September saw the first Manchester derby for three seasons, and it was a catastrophic one for United as they were defeated 5–1 at Maine Road by City. leaving them 14th in the First Division with seven points from their first seven games.

Despite Manchester United's erratic start to the season, the board offered Alex Ferguson a new contract with the club to take him up to the end of the 1992–93 season, and he accepted it.

By mid October, Michael Knighton had pulled out of his takeover bid, and accepted a non-executive role on the board of directors.

Later that month, Manchester United's hopes of winning the League Cup for the first time were ended with a 3–0 home defeat by Tottenham Hotspur in the third round.

On 30 December 1989, Manchester United played their final game of the 1980s, a 2–2 draw at Wimbledon, meaning that they had gone without a win since 18 November and were 15th in the First Division, just two points above the relegation zone. What had been anticipated as a title challenge appeared to have dissolved into a relegation battle, but the board continued to stand by Alex Ferguson and insisted that he will not be sacked; though naturally disappointed by the lack of success in the league, they understood the reasons; not least the injury crisis which had plagued the club constantly since the previous autumn.

On 7 January 1990, a goal by 20-year-old striker Mark Robins gave Manchester United a 1–0 win at Nottingham Forest in the FA Cup third round. When the FA Cup third round draw was made a month earlier, many journalists anticipated the tie as the game that would end in defeat for United and drive Ferguson out of his job.

Later that month, a 2–0 defeat at Norwich City pushed Manchester United just one place and one point short of the relegation zone, but they continued to progress in the FA Cup as Clayton Blackmore scored the only goal of the game for a United side who eliminated Hereford United from the FA Cup in the fourth round tie at Edgar Street.

A month later, they progressed to the FA Cup sixth round for the second year running by defeating Newcastle United 3–2 at St James' Park, and three weeks after that they booked their place in the FA Cup semi-finals for the first time since they won the trophy in 1985, thanks to a 1–0 win over Sheffield United at Bramall Lane.

The FA Cup semi-final at Maine Road on 8 April ended in a 3–3 draw with Oldham Athletic. They got through to the final with a 2–1 win in the replay, where they would be paired with a Crystal Palace side managed by former United player Steve Coppell.

United's league season ended with a 13th-place finish and only beating relegation by five points–their lowest since relegation 16 years earlier.

On 12 May, Manchester United took to the field at Wembley against Crystal Palace in the FA Cup final at Wembley Stadium. 18 minutes into the game, Palace (who had never played in the final before) took the lead through Gary O'Reilly, only for Bryan Robson to equalise in the 35th minute. Mark Hughes put United ahead in the 62nd minute, but Palace equalised in the 72nd minute through Ian Wright. The scores were still level at full-time, and the match went into extra time. Just two minutes into extra time, Wright put Palace ahead and it looked as though the FA Cup would be heading to Selhurst Park for the first time ever. Then, with seven minutes of extra time remaining, Mark Hughes equalised to force a replay.

Goalkeeper Jim Leighton had been performing erratically for much of the 1989–90 season, and his form in the FA Cup final was no different. Alex Ferguson then decided to drop Leighton for the replay and draft in Les Sealey, who had joined on loan from Luton Town the previous December and only played for the club twice before.

The replay was played at Wembley on 17 May, and Sealey pulled off a series of spectacular saves in the first half to prevent Palace from taking the lead. In the 59th minute, Lee Martin fired in a pass from Neil Webb to score only the second goal of his career and give the trophy to United.

Three weeks after the final, Manchester United signed Republic of Ireland defender Denis Irwin, 24, from Oldham Athletic for £625,000, with Alex Ferguson intending to use him as a right-back with Mike Phelan being switched to midfield.

== Squad statistics ==
Pos.	Name	League		FA Cup		League Cup		Total	
Pos.	Name	Apps	Goals	Apps	Goals	Apps	Goals	Apps	Goals
GK	(Australia) Mark Bosnich	1	0	0	0	0	0	1	0
GK	(Scotland) Jim Leighton	35	0	7	0	3	0	45	0
GK	(England) Les Sealey	2	0	1	0	0	0	3	0
DF	(England) Viv Anderson	14(2)	0	4	0	1	0	19(2)	0
DF	(Wales) Clayton Blackmore	19(9)	2	2(1)	1	0	0	21(10)	3
DF	(England) Steve Bruce	34	3	7	0	2	0	43	3
DF	(Northern Ireland) Mal Donaghy	13(1)	0	1	0	3	0	17(1)	0
DF	(England) Mike Duxbury	12(7)	0	2(2)	0	1(1)	0	15(10)	0
DF	(England) Colin Gibson	5(1)	1	1(1)	0	0	0	6(2)	1
DF	(England) Lee Martin	28(4)	0	8	1	1	0	37(4)	1
DF	(England) Gary Pallister	35	3	8	0	3	0	46	3
DF	(Republic of Ireland) Derek Brazil	0(1)	0	0	0	0	0	0(1)	0
MF	(England) Russell Beardsmore	8(13)	2	1(2)	0	1	0	10(15)	2
MF	(Wales) Deiniol Graham	0(1)	0	0	0	0	0	0(1)	0
MF	(England) Paul Ince	25(1)	0	6(1)	0	3	2	34(2)	2
MF	(Scotland) Ralph Milne	0(1)	0	0	0	0	0	0(1)	0
MF	(England) Mike Phelan	38	1	7	0	3	0	48	1
MF	(England) Bryan Robson	20	2	4	2	3	0	27	4
MF	(England) Lee Sharpe	13(5)	1	0	0	1(1)	0	14(6)	1
MF	(England) Neil Webb	10(1)	2	4	1	0	0	14(1)	3
FW	(Wales) Mark Hughes	36(1)	13	8	2	3	0	47(1)	15
FW	(England) Giuliano Maiorana	0(1)	0	0	0	0(1)	0	0(2)	0
FW	(Scotland) Brian McClair	37	5	8	3	3	0	48	8
FW	(England) Mark Robins	10(7)	7	3(3)	3	0	0	13(10)	10
FW	(England) Danny Wallace	23(3)	3	6(1)	2	2	1	31(4)	6

== Transfers ==
=== In ===
Date	Pos.	Name	From	Fee
1 July 1989	MF	(England) Mike Phelan	(England) Norwich City	£750k
1 July 1989	MF	(England) Neil Webb	(England) Nottingham Forest	£1.5m
24 August 1989	DF	(Republic of Ireland) Brian Carey	(Republic of Ireland) Cork City	£100k
28 August 1989	DF	(England) Gary Pallister	(England) Middlesbrough	£2.3m
13 September 1989	MF	(England) Paul Ince	(England) West Ham United	£2.4m
18 September 1989	FW	(England) Danny Wallace	(England) Southampton	£1.2m
21 September 1989	FW	(England) Andy Rammell	(England) Atherstone United	£40k
6 June 1990	GK	(England) Les Sealey	(England) Luton Town	Free
8 June 1990	DF	(Republic of Ireland) Denis Irwin	(England) Oldham Athletic	£625k
8 June 1990	DF	(England) Neil Whitworth	(England) Wigan Athletic	£45k

=== Out ===
Date	Pos.	Name	To	Fee
July 1989	DF	(England) Wayne Heseltine	(England) Oldham Athletic	£40k
12 July 1989	DF	(England) Nicky Spooner	(England) Bolton Wanderers	Undisclosed
3 August 1989	DF	(Republic of Ireland) Paul McGrath	(England) Aston Villa	£450k
August 1989	FW	(Northern Ireland) Norman Whiteside	(England) Everton	£750k
25 October 1989	FW	(Bermuda) Shaun Goater	(England) Rotherham United	£40k

=== Loan in ===
Date From	Date To	Position	Name	From
December 1989	December 1989	GK	(England) Les Sealey	(England) Luton Town
January 1990	February 1990	GK	(England) Mark Crossley	(England) Nottingham Forest
March 1990	April 1990	GK	(England) Les Sealey	(England) Luton Town
May 1990	June 1990	DF	(Scotland) Rob McKinnon	(England) Hartlepool United
May 1990	June 1990	DF	(England) Chris Short	(England) Scarborough

=== Loan out ===
Date From	Date To	Position	Name	To
December 1989	January 1990	DF	(Northern Ireland) Mal Donaghy	(England) Luton Town
January 1990	February 1990	MF	(Scotland) Ralph Milne	(England) West Ham United
