= Ian Wilkinson =

Ian Wilkinson may refer to:

- Ian Wilkinson (cyclist) (born 1979), English cyclist
- Ian Wilkinson (footballer) (born 1973), former Manchester United goalkeeper
- Ian Wilkinson (rugby league) (born 1960), British rugby league footballer
- Ian Wilkinson (actor), on List of former EastEnders characters
