= Mark Hughes =

Welsh football manager (born 1963)

Mark Hughes OBE
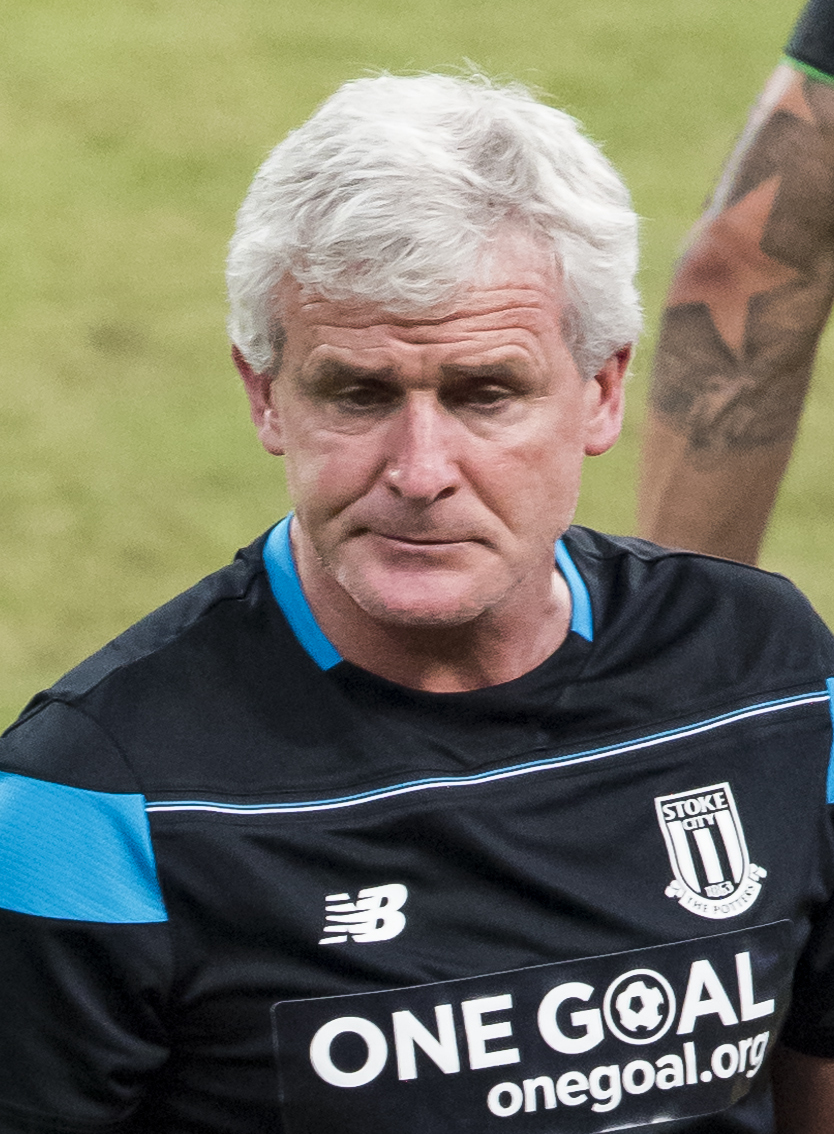
- Hughes in 2015

Personal information
- Full name: Leslie Mark Hughes
- Date of birth: 1 November 1963 (age 63)
- Place of birth: Ruabon, Denbighshire, Wales
- Height: 5 ft 9 in (1.74 m)
- Position: Forward

Youth career
- 1978–1980: Manchester United

Senior career*
Years	Team	Apps	(Gls)
1980–1986	Manchester United	89	(37)
1986–1988	Barcelona	28	(4)
1987–1988	→ Bayern Munich (loan)	18	(6)
1988–1995	Manchester United	256	(83)
1995–1998	Chelsea	95	(25)
1998–2000	Southampton	52	(2)
2000	Everton	18	(1)
2000–2002	Blackburn Rovers	50	(6)
Total		606	(164)

International career
1984–1999	Wales	72	(16)

Managerial career
- 1999–2004: Wales
- 2004–2008: Blackburn Rovers
- 2008–2009: Manchester City
- 2010–2011: Fulham
- 2012: Queens Park Rangers
- 2013–2018: Stoke City
- 2018: Southampton
- 2022–2023: Bradford City
- 2025–2026: Carlisle United
- * Club domestic league appearances and goals

Leslie Mark Hughes (born 1 November 1963) is a Welsh football manager and former player.

During his playing career he usually operated as a forward or midfielder. He had two spells at Manchester United, and also played for Barcelona and Bayern Munich, as well as the English clubs Chelsea, Southampton, Everton and finally Blackburn Rovers. He made 72 appearances for Wales scoring 16 goals. He won a host of winners' medals during his playing career, including two Premier League titles, four FA Cups, three League Cups and two UEFA Cup Winners' Cups. He also collected an FA Cup runners-up medal and a League Cup runners-up medal. Hughes was the first player to win the PFA Players' Player of the Year award twice, in 1989 and 1991, as well as having been the only person to have scored in the FA Community Shield, League Cup final, and FA Cup final in the same season (1993–94). He retired from playing in 2002.

Hughes was appointed manager of Wales in 1999 and remained in the role until 2004. He failed to qualify for a World Cup or European Championship, but came particularly close to securing 2004 European Championship qualification. Hughes then spent four years in charge of Blackburn, guiding them to sixth place in 2005–06. He took charge of Manchester City in June 2008 for a year and a half before spending the 2010–11 season at Fulham. He joined Queens Park Rangers in January 2012, helping them retain their Premier League status in 2011–12. Despite some high-profile signings before the 2012–13 season, Hughes was dismissed in November.

Hughes was appointed manager of Stoke City in May 2013. He guided the club to three consecutive ninth-place Premier League finishes in 2013–14, 2014–15 and 2015–16, followed by 13th in the 2016–17 season. In the 2017–18 season, with the club in the relegation zone, he was dismissed in January 2018, hours after an FA Cup third round exit to League Two side Coventry City. He was appointed manager of 17th-placed Southampton in March, and guided the club to safety at the end of the 2017–18 season, but was dismissed in December with the club 18th in the table. From February 2022 to October 2023 he managed Bradford City in League Two, and from February 2025 to May 2026 he led Carlisle United, overseeing their relegation to the National League.

== Club career ==
=== Manchester United ===
Born in Ruabon, Denbighshire, Hughes joined Manchester United after leaving school in the summer of 1980, having been spotted by the team's North Wales talent scout Hugh Roberts. However, he did not make his first-team debut for three years – scoring in a 1–1 draw away to Oxford United in the League Cup, in the 1983–84 season.

When Hughes made his United debut, the club's forward partnership consisted of 27-year-old Irishman Frank Stapleton and 18-year-old Norman Whiteside from Northern Ireland, and breaking up that partnership would not be an easy challenge for Hughes. But Hughes eventually broke into the first team in April of 1984; partnering Frank Stapleton in attack while Norman Whiteside was relegated to the bench. The following season saw Hughes initially partner Whiteside ahead of new signing Alan Brazil, with Frank Stapleton missing the first three months through injury. Hughes scored 25 goals in 55 matches across all competitions as United achieved an FA Cup final victory over Everton. They also finished fourth in the league.

Hughes managed a further 18 goals in the 1985–86 season, where they led until February having won their first ten league matches of the season, before a dismal second half of the season saw them slip into fourth place in the final table. That season saw him score 17 goals in the Football League First Division – it would remain the highest goals tally in a league season throughout his career.

=== Barcelona ===
In the summer of 1986, Hughes was sold to Barcelona for £2 million. United announced on 21 March 1986 that Hughes would be heading for Spain at the end of the season, but the transfer had been agreed many weeks earlier.

Manager Terry Venables signed Hughes at the same time that he signed Gary Lineker from Everton to form a new strike partnership at the Camp Nou, but Hughes was a disappointment in his only season at Barcelona, scoring only 5 times in 37 games, whereas Lineker proved a success in three seasons at the club, scoring 51 in 138 games.

==== Loan to Bayern Munich ====
He was subsequently loaned out to West German club Bayern Munich for the 1987–88 season, where he regained his form. On 11 November 1987, he played two competitive matches in one day, first for Wales against Czechoslovakia in Prague in a Euro 1988 qualifier, and second, after being flown across the border into West Germany, appearing as a substitute for Bayern in their win over Borussia Mönchengladbach in a DFB-Pokal second round replay.

=== Return to Manchester United ===
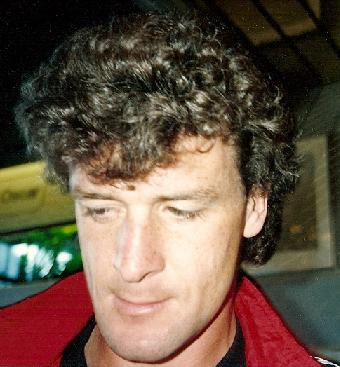
Hughes with Manchester United in 1991

In May 1988, Hughes returned to Manchester United, managed by Alex Ferguson, for a then club record fee of £1.8 million. As he had done in his first spell at Old Trafford, Hughes proved to be a dynamic goalscorer and was a key player for the club over the next seven years. Alex Ferguson had been keen on re-signing Hughes for United soon after becoming manager in November 1986, but Hughes would have been liable for taxation on money earned playing overseas if he had returned to England before April 1988.

In 1988–89, his first season back in England, United disappointed in the league and finished 11th after an erratic season. They had gone ten league matches without a win in the autumn but then went on a strong run after the turn of the new year to lift them to third place, only for a late season collapse to drag them down to mid-table. Hughes was voted PFA Player of the Year, the first Manchester United player to be credited with that award, in its 16th season. He was also United's joint top scorer that season, along with Brian McClair, on 16 goals.

A year later, Hughes scored twice as United drew 3–3 with Crystal Palace in the 1990 FA Cup final, before a Lee Martin goal in the replay gave United their first major trophy in five years. He was United's top goalscorer that season, scoring 15 goals in all competitions; 13 of his goals had come in the league, where United finished a disappointing 13th. He scored his third United hat-trick in a September clash against Millwall in the league at Old Trafford, which United won 5–1.

The following season, Hughes scored both goals against former club Barcelona as United lifted the UEFA Cup Winners' Cup, winning the final 2–1 in Rotterdam. Once again, he was their top scorer, this time with 21 goals in all competitions, although his tally in the league was bettered by Brian McClair and Steve Bruce. They also reached the Football League Cup final that year, but United suffered a shock 1–0 defeat to a Sheffield Wednesday side managed by Ron Atkinson, who had been Hughes's manager in his first spell at Old Trafford. Hughes was also voted PFA Player of the Year again this season. The 1990–91 season also saw Hughes score the last of his four hat-tricks for United, in a League Cup quarter-final replay against Southampton at Old Trafford, which United won 3–2. In 1991–92, Hughes suffered the disappointment of missing out on a league title medal as United were pipped to the title by Leeds United, but had some compensation in the form of a League Cup winner's medal. He found the net 11 times in the league and 14 times in all competitions.

For much of the 1991–92 season, United had been linked with a move for the Southampton striker Alan Shearer, but the player chose to stay at the South Coast club until the season's end before making a decision about his future, before deciding to sign for Blackburn Rovers. Sir Alex Ferguson remained intent on signing a new striker for United that summer, although it was far from clear whether it was Hughes or his strike-partner Brian McClair who would lose his place in the first team or be switched to another position in order to accommodate a new signing. Ferguson's hunt for a new striker ended with the acquisition of Dion Dublin, although Dublin was injured after playing just a few matches for the club, and it was not long before United were in the hunt for another new striker, as a lack of goals were seeing them slip behind in the title race. Eric Cantona was eventually signed at the end of November, which prompted interest from Newcastle United manager Kevin Keegan, who had first asked Ferguson about Hughes's availability that summer. Ferguson, however, insisted that Hughes was not for sale, and he remained a regular choice in the first team, playing alongside Cantona while McClair was mostly selected in central midfield from then on.

In May 1993, Hughes finally collected an English league title medal as United won the first-ever Premier League title; Hughes was United's top scorer with 15 goals in the league and a further goal in the League Cup. From December, he mostly played alongside new signing Eric Cantona in attack, with Brian McClair being switched to the centre of midfield. Hughes collected yet more silverware in 1994 as United won the league title as well as the FA Cup, with Hughes scoring in the final. He also scored Manchester United's consolation goal in their 3–1 defeat in the 1994 League Cup Final at the hands of Aston Villa at Wembley in that season. In so doing, he became only the second player (after Norman Whiteside in 1983) to score in the finals of both the domestic cups in the same season. This has since been achieved a third time by Didier Drogba in 2007. His partnership with Cantona in attack also went from strength to strength, as he found the net 22 times in all competitions as Cantona scored a further 25.

In December 1994, with United second to Blackburn in the race for the league title, media reports were linking United with the signature of several highly rated strikers including Andy Cole and Stan Collymore, and there had already been some impressive performances in the first team from 20-year-old striker Paul Scholes. Hughes was now widely tipped to be the player most likely to lose his place to any new signing in the forward positions, and when United completed the £7 million signing of Cole on 10 January 1995, it was almost immediately reported that new Everton manager Joe Royle was tabling a £2.5 million bid for Hughes.

Four days later, however, Hughes suffered a knee injury early in a match against Newcastle, colliding with opposition goalkeeper Pavel Srníček as he scored a goal. The injury was initially feared to be cruciate knee ligament damage, which would inevitably have put him out of action for at least the rest of the season, but it was instead revealed to be a serious gash, and he was back in action within a month, during which time United were left without the services of Eric Cantona, who attacked a Crystal Palace fan and was subsequently banned for eight months. Hughes now found himself with his first team place still looking secure, at least in the short term, and in partnership with Andy Cole. He even signed a new two-year contract.

Hughes came close to winning both the Premier League and FA Cup again in 1995, but a failure to beat West Ham United on the final day of the season and the inability to score an equaliser against Everton in the FA Cup final a week later condemned United to their first trophyless season in six years. The FA Cup final was his last match in a United shirt. Hughes scored eight league goals in 1994–95 (two of them in the 9–0 defeat of Ipswich Town at Old Trafford on 4 March 1995) and managed a total of 12 in all competitions (two in the FA Cup and another two in the European Cup). During two spells at the club, he had found the net a total of 163 times (116 of his goals coming during his second spell). Perhaps the most memorable of those goals came in April 1994, when he scored a spectacular equaliser in the final minute of extra time in the FA Cup semi-final against Oldham Athletic at Wembley.

By the time of his departure from Manchester United, he was the last player at the club to have been there before the appointment of Sir Alex Ferguson as manager in November 1986, albeit having left for Barcelona before Ferguson was hired and then returning two years into his stint as manager.

=== Chelsea ===
Hughes left Old Trafford for the second and final time in June 1995 when he was sold to Chelsea for £1 million, in a summer that also saw the departures of players such as Paul Ince (to Inter Milan) and Andrei Kanchelskis (to Everton). Hughes scored a consolation goal for Chelsea in the home Premier League fixture against Manchester United in 1995–96; a 4–1 win for United at Stamford Bridge in October. He was on the losing side again as United beat Chelsea 2–1 in the FA Cup semi-final that season, less than two years after he had scored one of United's goals in their FA Cup final triumph over Chelsea.

Hughes was one of the key players in Chelsea's resurgence as a top club in the late 1990s, forming a potent strike partnership with Gianfranco Zola and helping to freeze out Gianluca Vialli (who became the club's player-manager in February 1998). He put in match-winning performances against Liverpool and Wimbledon in the FA Cup in 1997, and Vicenza in the UEFA Cup Winners' Cup a year later, playing a big part in Chelsea's glory in both of these competitions. In winning the FA Cup, he became the only player in the 20th century to win the trophy four times. He ended his Chelsea career with 39 goals from 123 matches and was transferred to Southampton for £650,000 in July 1998.

=== Southampton ===
In July 1998, Hughes was signed by Southampton for a fee of £650,000 by manager Dave Jones, as an alternative to injury-plagued David Hirst, who retired within 18 months of Hughes's arrival. The goals failed to flow and Hughes was pushed back into midfield, where his experience helped Southampton maintain their Premier League status.

His two goals for Southampton came against Blackburn Rovers, who he was later to join, and a "memorable volley" at home to Newcastle on 15 August 1999. Hughes had disciplinary problems throughout his career, and in his first season at The Dell he received 14 yellow cards, a total which has not been exceeded in the Premier League as of 2022.

=== Everton ===
When Glenn Hoddle arrived as Southampton's manager in January 2000, Hughes did not fit into his plans and he left for Everton in March 2000. He played 16 times over the course of seven months for Everton, scoring his only goal against Watford.

=== Blackburn Rovers ===
Hughes left Goodison Park on a free transfer for Blackburn Rovers in October 2000, moving outside the top division for the first time in his playing career in 2000–01. He played a key role in Blackburn's promotion from Division One to the Premier League in 2001. He also lifted the League Cup with Blackburn in February 2002, before retiring as a player in July 2002 at the age of 38.

Hughes's final career goal came in a 2–1 Premier League defeat to Leicester City on 30 March 2002. At the time, he was the second oldest player to score in the Premier League, behind Stuart Pearce.

== International career ==
Hughes scored just 17 minutes into his Wales debut, scoring the winning goal against England on 2 May 1984. He went on to play 72 times for his country, scoring 16 times.

== Managerial career ==
=== Wales ===
Hughes was appointed as head coach of the Wales national team in 1999, while still playing elite club football for a few more seasons. Initially appointed on a temporary basis alongside Neville Southall to replace Bobby Gould, Hughes had soon done enough to earn himself a long-term contract, with Southall eventually leaving the set-up. When he took over, Wales were going through a bad patch but in the five years with Hughes in charge, Wales came close to qualifying for UEFA Euro 2004. In their Euro 2004 qualifying group, Wales ended up second, beating Italy 2–1 in Cardiff in the process, but were denied a place in the final tournament after losing to Russia in the playoffs.

=== Blackburn Rovers ===
Hughes quit the Welsh national side in September 2004 to take charge of Blackburn in the FA Premier League, the last club he had played for. His key aim was to keep Blackburn clear of relegation, which he succeeded in doing, while also taking the club to an FA Cup semi-final for the first time in over 40 years.

In his second season, he helped Blackburn finish inside the top six of the Premier League and subsequently qualify for the UEFA Cup, beating teams such as Chelsea, Manchester United (twice) and Arsenal en route. After just missing out on the League Cup final, his team sealed their spot in Europe by defeating champions Chelsea 1–0 at home. On 4 May 2006, Hughes and assistant Mark Bowen signed new three-year contracts to remain at Blackburn until the summer of 2009.

Hughes then set about creating a formidable side at Ewood Park. He entered the transfer market, bringing in players such as Benni McCarthy (£2 million), David Bentley (£500,000), Ryan Nelsen (free), Stephen Warnock (£1.5 million), Roque Santa Cruz (£3.5 million), and Christopher Samba (£400,000). Rovers finished tenth in the Premier League in 2006–07, and reached the UEFA Cup round of 32, where they were knocked out by Bayer Leverkusen 3–2 on aggregate. Rovers faced Chelsea in the FA Cup semi-final, their third consecutive semi-final since Hughes took charge. The match ended in defeat, 2–1. He won the Premier League Manager of the Month award for October 2007, and eventually led Blackburn to a league finish of seventh in 2007–08, Hughes's final season in charge at Ewood Park.

During his spell in charge of Blackburn, Hughes's side was accused of being "over-physical" on multiple occasions and the club finished bottom of the Premier League disciplinary table in all four of Hughes's seasons in charge.

=== Manchester City ===
On 2 June 2008, Manchester City dismissed manager Sven-Göran Eriksson. Interest was also reported from Chelsea, however, who had recently dismissed their manager, Avram Grant. Blackburn confirmed on 2 June that they had agreed to allow Hughes to talk to City. The following day, Blackburn agreed to a compensation package for Hughes to take over as manager of Manchester City, and he was appointed as head coach on 4 June 2008 on a three-year contract.

Following the appointment, Manchester City's executive chairman Garry Cook stated, "The Club intends to invest in new players as well as securing the long term services of key members of the current first team squad. Mark has already identified some of the players and backroom staff that he wants to see here at City, and we will begin the process of recruiting them immediately." The players who did arrive were Jô, Tal Ben Haim, Vincent Kompany, Shaun Wright-Phillips (returning from Chelsea) and Pablo Zabaleta. Hughes's first match in charge resulted in a 4–2 loss to Aston Villa at Villa Park but was followed up with 3–0 wins against West Ham and Sunderland.

On 1 September 2008, Manchester City were taken over by the Abu Dhabi United investment group, who made large amounts of transfer funds available to Hughes, allowing City to break the British transfer record and sign Robinho from Real Madrid for £32.5 million. Hughes was very active in the January 2009 transfer window, signing Wayne Bridge from Chelsea, Craig Bellamy from West Ham and Shay Given from Newcastle, as well as Nigel de Jong from Hamburger SV. City finished tenth in Hughes's first season with the club, as well as reaching the quarter-finals of the UEFA Cup. City's home form was among the best in the League, but their away form was among the worst.

In the summer of 2009, Hughes added Gareth Barry from Aston Villa, Roque Santa Cruz from Blackburn, and Emmanuel Adebayor and Kolo Touré from Arsenal to his squad, while Carlos Tevez also joined after his two-year deal with Manchester United expired. In addition, Hughes signed defenders Joleon Lescott from Everton for a reported £22 million, and Sylvinho – a former Arsenal and double Champions League winner with Barcelona – on a free transfer.

Hughes started the 2009–10 Premier League campaign with a 2–0 away win at former club Blackburn, followed by a 1–0 win over another former club, Barcelona, in the Joan Gamper Trophy at a capacity Camp Nou. City then won 1–0 win over Wolverhampton Wanderers at Eastlands, followed by Crystal Palace in the League Cup 2–0 and Portsmouth 1–0 to maintain a 100% clean sheet start to the season. City continued in good form, beating Arsenal 4–2 and West Ham 3–1 either side of a 4–3 derby day defeat to Manchester United. City would then, however, go on a run of seven-straight draws.

Manchester City beat Scunthorpe United 5–1 and Arsenal 3–0 in the League Cup to reach their first semi-final since 1981. Hughes then led City to their first victory over his former club Chelsea for five years with a 2–1 victory. That last victory was one of only two wins in 11 successive Premier League matches, and Hughes left City before their League Cup two-legged semi-final against Manchester United; he was dismissed on 19 December 2009 and replaced by Roberto Mancini.

=== Fulham ===
On 29 July 2010, Hughes became the new manager of Fulham, following the departure of Roy Hodgson to Liverpool. Hughes agreed a two-year contract with the London side and was officially unveiled to the media on 3 August 2010, before his first match as manager on 7 August against Werder Bremen. Hughes was joined at Fulham by his backroom team of Eddie Niedzwiecki, Mark Bowen and Kevin Hitchcock. His first league match in charge of the Cottagers came exactly a week later, when they drew 0–0 at Bolton Wanderers on the opening day of the Premier League season, followed by a resolute display against Manchester United in a 2–2 draw at Craven Cottage.

Draws followed in four of Fulham's next five Premier League matches against Blackpool, Blackburn Rovers, Everton and West Ham, with a solitary 2–1 home win over Wolves. This meant that at that stage – including the seven-draw streak at Manchester City before his dismissal the season before – all but two (86%) of Hughes's last fifteen Premiership matches had been drawn. The bizarre run, exclusively made up of draws or 2–1 results, continued with 2–1 defeats to Tottenham Hotspur and West Bromwich Albion in the second half of October 2010. At the end of the 2010–11 season, Hughes led Fulham to an eighth-placed finish in the league and UEFA Europa League qualification through the Fair Play league.

Hughes resigned as manager of Fulham on 2 June 2011, having spent less than 11 months at the club. Following his departure, he said, "As a young, ambitious manager I wish to move on to further my experiences." Fulham owner Mohamed Al-Fayed hit back at Hughes for questioning the club's ambition, calling him a "strange man" and a "flop" and said he rescued him from becoming a forgotten man after being dismissed by Manchester City. In September 2013, Hughes said he made a mistake in leaving Fulham when he did.

=== Queens Park Rangers ===
On 10 January 2012, Hughes agreed terms with Queens Park Rangers and signed a two-and-a-half-year contract as their new manager, replacing the recently dismissed Neil Warnock. Hughes's first match in charge of QPR came on 15 January 2012, a 1–0 defeat away to Newcastle. Hughes's first win as QPR manager came on 17 January 2012, a 1–0 victory over Milton Keynes Dons in a FA Cup third round replay at Loftus Road. His first Premier League victory was on 21 January 2012, QPR beating Wigan Athletic 3–1 at home.

In January 2012, Hughes brought in two defenders in Nedum Onuoha and Taye Taiwo and two strikers in Djibril Cissé and Bobby Zamora. Cissé made an immediate impact scoring on his debut against Aston Villa. Defeats against Wolves, Blackburn and Fulham, however, prevented QPR from pulling themselves away from relegation trouble. Victories over Liverpool, Arsenal, Stoke City, Swansea City and Tottenham meant that they went into the final match of the season two points ahead of Bolton. They faced Hughes's former club Manchester City at the City of Manchester Stadium, who needed a win to secure the Premier League title. Despite scoring twice through Cissé and Jamie Mackie, two added time goals from Edin Džeko and Sergio Agüero earned City a dramatic victory and championship title. Bolton's failure to beat Stoke, however, meant that QPR avoided relegation to the Championship.

In the summer of 2012, QPR brought in a large number of high-profile signings with the intent of establishing themselves as a Premier League club. In came Ryan Nelsen, Andrew Johnson, Robert Green, Samba Diakité, Fabio, Park Ji-sung and Junior Hoilett all before the start of the season. Rangers' new-look squad, however, got off to an awful start as they crashed to a 5–0 home defeat against Swansea on the opening day of the 2012–13 Premier League season. Hughes branded his players performance as "embarrassing". Hughes then signed José Bosingwa, Júlio César and Esteban Granero but saw no improvement in results, going 12 matches without victory. He was dismissed as manager on 23 November 2012 after the team suffered a 3–1 home defeat to Southampton six days earlier and replaced by Harry Redknapp.

=== Stoke City ===
==== 2013–14 ====
Hughes was appointed manager of Stoke City on 30 May 2013, signing a three-year contract after taking over from fellow Welshman Tony Pulis. Speaking after being announced as Stoke's new manager, Hughes admitted that he had a point to prove following his disappointing spell at QPR. Hughes's first task was to release Rory Delap, Mamady Sidibe, Matthew Upson, Dean Whitehead, Carlo Nash and Matty Lund, at the same time giving Jermaine Pennant a new contract. He made his first signing on 28 June 2013 in Dutch international left-back Erik Pieters from PSV for a fee of €3.6 million (£3 million). Hughes's first match in charge of Stoke on 17 August 2013 ended in a 1–0 defeat at Liverpool. Hughes's first win as Stoke manager came in his next match as Stoke beat Crystal Palace 2–1 at the Britannia Stadium. This was followed up by a 1–0 win away at West Ham. On 2 September 2013, transfer deadline day, Hughes brought in Austrian forward Marko Arnautović from Werder Bremen and Stephen Ireland on loan from Aston Villa. Meanwhile, Michael Kightly, Cameron Jerome and Ryan Shotton all departed the club on long-term loans.

Stoke soon lost their early form, however, and went through September and October without a Premier League win, picking up just two points and scoring only three goals. Stoke improved in November and December, going a run of one defeat in seven matches, including a 3–2 win over Chelsea on 7 December 2013. December ended badly for Stoke and Hughes, however, as they were on the receiving end of a 5–1 defeat at Newcastle in which Stoke were reduced to nine men and Hughes himself was sent off. Stoke went through January 2014 in poor form and managed to pick up just a point and a 1–0 defeat at Sunderland on 29 January, leaving the club just above the relegation zone. The one piece of transfer activity Hughes did was to swap Kenwyne Jones for Peter Odemwingie in a player-exchange deal with Cardiff City. The arrival of Odemwingie enabled Hughes to alter his tactics and formation and it immediately paid off with a 2–1 victory over Manchester United. Stoke's form continued to improve and they went through March unbeaten with wins over Arsenal, West Ham, Aston Villa and Hull City. Stoke proceeded to end the season strongly with wins over Newcastle, Fulham and a 2–1 win against West Brom on the final day of the season, which saw Stoke finish in ninth position, their best finish since 1974–75.

==== 2014–15 ====
For the 2014–15 season, Hughes signed Sunderland full-back Phil Bardsley, Fulham midfielder Steve Sidwell and Senegalese striker Mame Biram Diouf on free transfers. Also arriving for small fees were Slovak defender Dionatan Teixeira and Barcelona forward Bojan, while wingers Victor Moses and Oussama Assaidi joined on season-long loans. Departing were Matthew Etherington, Michael Kightly, Cameron Jerome and Ryan Shotton. Stoke had a mixed start to the 2014–15 season, losing 1–0 to Aston Villa on the opening day, drawing 1–1 with ten-men Hull City, yet defeating reigning Premier League champions Manchester City 1–0. Stoke's inconsistency continued through the autumn as Stoke managed just three wins beating Newcastle, Swansea and Tottenham. The club then suffered frustrating home defeats against newly promoted Burnley and Leicester City. Stoke found form in December beating Arsenal 3–2, Everton 1–0 and West Brom 2–0.

In January 2015, Hughes began talks with the Stoke board of directors about extending his contract with the club. Hughes's only new arrival in January was that of German centre back Philipp Wollscheid from Bayer Leverkusen. Stoke suffered a number in injuries to key players in January and February, most notably to Shawcross and Bojan. In February, Stoke suffered back to back 4–1 defeats against Manchester City and then in the FA Cup against Blackburn. Hughes signed a new contract with Stoke in March 2015 to keep him contracted until the summer of 2019. City then went a run of three wins against Aston Villa, Hull and Everton and then three defeats against West Brom, Crystal Palace and Chelsea. Stoke ended the season strongly with victories over Southampton (2–1), Tottenham (3–0) and Liverpool (6–1), ensuring a second consecutive ninth-place finish.

==== 2015–16 ====
Hughes made a number of alterations to his squad in preparation for the 2015–16 campaign. Leaving the club were the long-serving trio of Asmir Begović, Robert Huth and Steven Nzonzi, with Stoke receiving their record transfer fee in the process. With the money available, Hughes broke Stoke's transfer record by paying Inter Milan £12 million for Swiss winger Xherdan Shaqiri. Hughes also brought in Spanish striker Joselu for £5.75 million, Dutch midfielder Ibrahim Afellay, Shay Given, Jakob Haugaard, Glen Johnson and Marco van Ginkel. The club had a poor start to the season, failing to win any of their first six fixtures, losing three of them. Stoke recovered well, however, winning their next three matches against AFC Bournemouth, Aston Villa and Swansea. Stoke's improvement continued through November and December with victories against Premier League champions Chelsea, Southampton, Manchester City and Manchester United; the team's style of football was praised by the national press. Stoke ended 2015 with a dramatic 4–3 win away at Everton, while they also reached the semi-final of the League Cup after defeating Luton Town, Fulham, Chelsea and Sheffield Wednesday en route.

Stoke started 2016 poorly, falling to West Brom and then Liverpool in the first leg of the League Cup semi-final. The club endured a tough final week of January as they lost 3–0 to both Leicester and Manchester United and were knocked out of the League Cup by Liverpool after losing on penalties, and were also ousted from the FA Cup by Crystal Palace. In the January transfer window, Hughes let Steve Sidwell leave as well as cutting short Marco van Ginkel's loan, while he broke the club's transfer record he had set in the summer after signing French midfielder Giannelli Imbula from Porto for a fee of £18.3 million. Stoke's form improved in February and March as they defeated Bournemouth, Aston Villa, Newcastle, Watford and earned a first Premier League draw at Chelsea. Following a season-ending injury to goalkeeper Jack Butland while on international duty, however, Stoke lost their defensive organisation: They let a 2–0 lead slip against Swansea to draw 2–2 and then went and conceded four goals in three successive matches, against Liverpool, Tottenham and Manchester City. Hughes's team were able to end the season on a positive as they beat West Ham 2–1 on the final day of the season, enough to secure a third-straight ninth-place finish.

==== 2016–17 ====
Hughes spent £18 million in July 2016 to bring in Welsh midfielder Joe Allen and Egyptian winger Ramadan Sobhi, while defender Bruno Martins Indi and striker Wilfried Bony both joined on season-long loans on 31 August 2016 from Porto and Manchester City respectively. Departing the club were Joselu, Philipp Wollscheid and long-serving defender Marc Wilson, who left for Bournemouth after criticising Hughes's defensive training on social media. Stoke began the 2016–17 season in poor form, drawing 1–1 away at Middlesbrough, then losing 4–1 to Manchester City, 1–0 to Everton and 4–0 to Tottenham, and 4–1 to Crystal Palace with chairman Peter Coates heavily criticising the team's performances. Results improved in October and November and by December Stoke had moved back into a mid-table position. However, Stoke picked up just two points over the Christmas period and Hughes came under strong criticism from supporters after his side lost a 2–0 lead against 10-man Leicester City.

In the January transfer window, Hughes brought in long term transfer target Saido Berahino from West Brom. Performances until the end of the season were underwhelming with six wins from 19, with Stoke securing their Premier League status with two matches remaining. A 1–0 win against Southampton on the final day of the season meant that Stoke ended the campaign in 13th place, their lowest finish under Hughes.

In September 2017, just after full time following a 2–2 draw with Manchester United, manager José Mourinho refused to shake hands with Hughes. The Guardian reported that Mourinho believed Hughes had sworn at him during the game, and that Hughes had requested that a referee send him off for entering Stoke's technical area. Mourinho declined Hughes's handshake post-match, making it an unusual public managerial snub.

==== 2017–18 ====
Stoke made a poor start to the new season. Hughes came under intense scrutiny by supporters throughout the season, particularly after a 5–0 defeat by Chelsea, where Hughes rested several first team regulars to prepare for a home match against Newcastle United; Stoke also lost this game, resulting in calls for him to be dismissed. By January, Stoke had won only 5 of 22 games, occupying a place in the relegation zone with 20 points. Stoke's run of poor form included a demoralising 3–0 home defeat to West Ham United, where former player Marko Arnautović scored and celebrated in front of the home fans after having been sold in the summer, as well as several heavy defeats to clubs challenging for the top six positions, including a 7–2 away defeat to Manchester City and a 5–1 defeat to Tottenham Hotspur.

After a 2–1 defeat in the FA Cup to League Two side Coventry City on 6 January 2018, Hughes was dismissed. Stoke had the worst defensive record in the Premier League at the time of his dismissal, having conceded a total of 47 goals, nine more than West Ham who had the second-worst record. This was in spite of several defensive signings being made in the summer of 2017, including the £18 million signing of Kevin Wimmer from Tottenham Hotspur, the £7 million permanent signing of Bruno Martins Indi, and the season-long loan of Chelsea defender Kurt Zouma.

=== Southampton ===
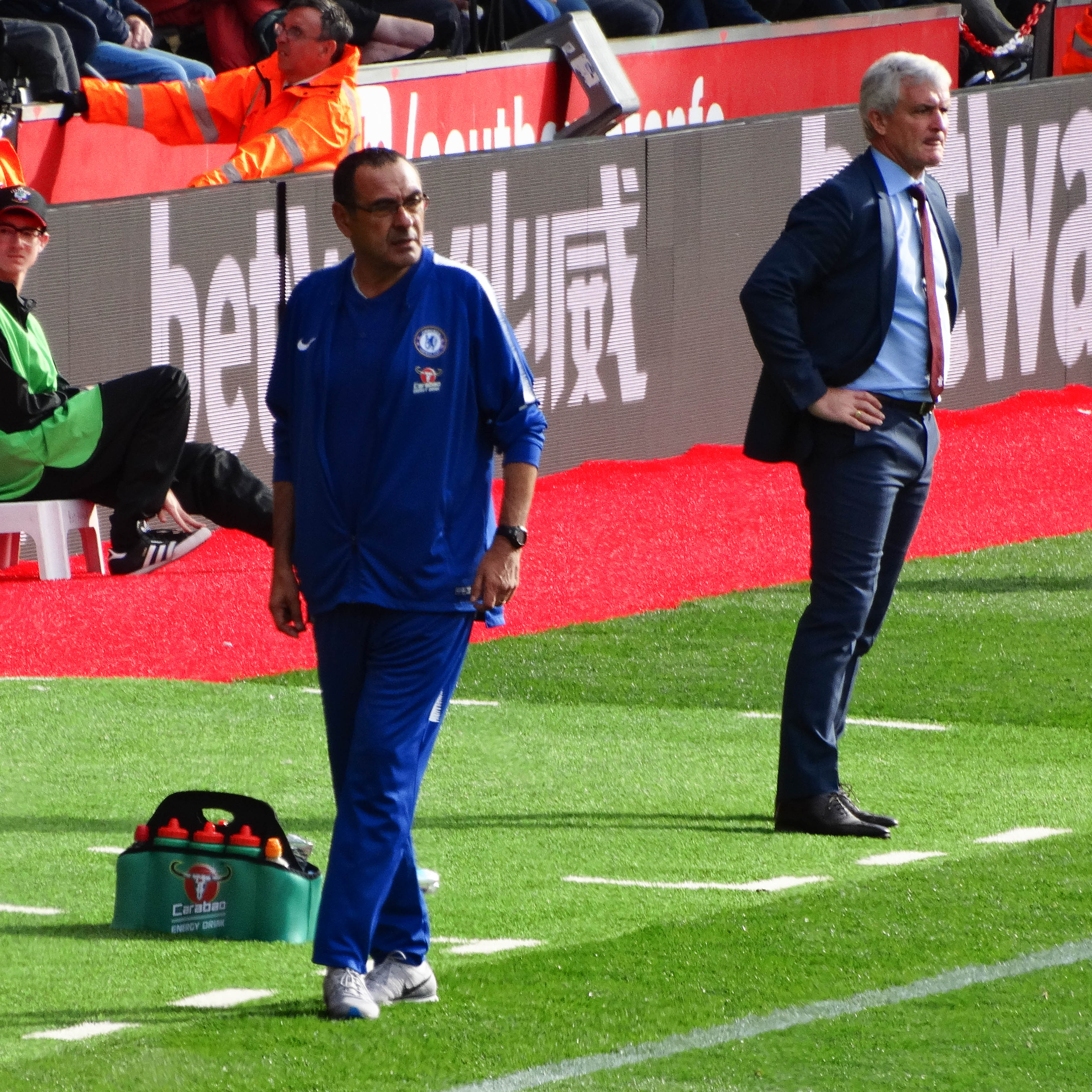
Hughes (right) managing Southampton in 2018

On 14 March 2018, Hughes succeeded Mauricio Pellegrino as manager of relegation-threatened Premier League club Southampton, signing a short-term contract for the remainder of the 2017–18 season. His first game was a 2–0 win at Wigan Athletic in an FA Cup quarter final. On 25 May 2018, after a season that saw the Saints retain their Premier League status, the club announced that Hughes had signed a new three-year contract. His assistants, Mark Bowen and Eddie Niedzwiecki, also signed long-term contracts with the club.

Despite a number of positive signings in the summer transfer window, Southampton made a poor start to the 2018–19 season and on 2 December 2018, with the club 18th in the table, Hughes was dismissed. He was replaced by former RB Leipzig boss Ralph Hasenhüttl.

=== Bradford City ===
On 24 February 2022, Hughes was appointed manager of Bradford City on a deal until the summer of 2024. This was the first time he had managed a club outside the Premier League.

Hughes was nominated for the League Two Manager of the Month award for September 2022 after Bradford went unbeaten in four matches.

On 4 October 2023, Hughes was dismissed as manager with Bradford sitting 18th in League Two. It was felt by the Bradford City players that Hughes was trying to shoehorn Premier League tactics into the League Two side, and this ultimately contributed to the lack of success in his second season.

=== Carlisle United ===
On 6 February 2025, Hughes was appointed head coach of League Two side Carlisle United. Two days later, he lost his first game in charge, with Carlisle defeated 2–1 at Grimsby Town. Carlisle were relegated with one game still to play at the end of the 2024–25 season. On 19 May 2025, it was confirmed that he would remain with the club for the 2025–26 season. On 28 May 2026, three weeks after Carlisle's National League play-off semi-final defeat to Boreham Wood, Hughes left the club by mutual consent.

== Personal life ==
Throughout his career, Hughes has been known by the nickname "Sparky" which he took from the comic of the same name. Hughes grew up supporting his hometown club, Wrexham. He was appointed an Officer of the Order of the British Empire (OBE) in the 2004 Birthday Honours for services to football. Hughes wrote his autobiography in 1990 entitled Sparky – Barcelona, Bayern and Back.

Hughes married his wife Jill in the mid-1980s. They had two sons, Alex and Curtis, and a daughter, Xenna, who plays hockey for Wales. Alex Hughes, who was head of player recruitment at Grimsby Town, died in June 2026 at the age of 38. An inquest found that he died from sudden arrhythmic death syndrome. Following his death, Mark Hughes and his wife Jill said they were "totally heartbroken by the sudden and unexpected loss of our beloved son".

== Career statistics ==
=== Club ===
Appearances and goals by club, season and competition
Club	Season	League			National cup (Note: Includes FA Cup, Copa del Rey, DFB-Pokal)		League cup (Note: Includes Football League Cup)		Europe		Other^{[A]}		Total	
Club	Season	Division	Apps	Goals	Apps	Goals	Apps	Goals	Apps	Goals	Apps	Goals	Apps	Goals
Manchester United	1983–84	First Division	11	4	0	0	2	1	4 (Note: Appearances in European Cup Winners' Cup)	0	0	0	17	5
Manchester United	1984–85	First Division	38	16	7	3	2	3	8 (Note: Appearances in UEFA Cup)	2	—		55	24
Manchester United	1985–86	First Division	40	17	3	1	2	0	—		4	0	49	18
Manchester United	Total		89	37	10	4	6	4	12	2	4	0	121	47
Barcelona	1986–87	La Liga	28	4	2	0	—		7	1	—		37	5
Bayern Munich (loan)	1987–88	Bundesliga	18	6	3	1	—		2 (Note: Appearances in European Cup)	0	0	0	23	7
Manchester United	1988–89	First Division	38	14	7	2	3	0	—		3 (Note: Appearances in Football League Centenary Trophy)	0	51	16
Manchester United	1989–90	First Division	37	13	8	2	3	0	—		—		48	15
Manchester United	1990–91	First Division	31	10	3	2	9	6	8	3	1 (Note: Appearance in FA Charity Shield)	0	52	21
Manchester United	1991–92	First Division	39	11	3	1	6	0	4	2	1 (Note: Appearance in European Super Cup)	0	53	14
Manchester United	1992–93	Premier League	41	15	2	0	3	1	2	0	—		48	16
Manchester United	1993–94	Premier League	36	12	7	4	8	5	2	0	1	1	54	22
Manchester United	1994–95	Premier League	34	8	6	2	0	0	5 (Note: Appearances in UEFA Champions League)	2	1	0	46	12
Manchester United	Total		256	83	36	13	32	12	21	7	7	1	352	116
Chelsea	1995–96	Premier League	31	8	6	4	2	0	—		—		39	12
Chelsea	1996–97	Premier League	35	8	7	5	2	1	—		—		44	14
Chelsea	1997–98	Premier League	29	9	1	0	6	2	3	1	1	1	40	13
Chelsea	Total		95	25	14	9	10	3	3	1	1	1	123	39
Southampton	1998–99	Premier League	32	1	2	0	2	0	—		—		36	1
Southampton	1999–2000	Premier League	20	1	2	0	3	0	—		—		25	1
Southampton	Total		52	2	4	0	5	0	—		—		61	2
Everton	1999–2000	Premier League	9	1	0	0	0	0	—		—		9	1
Everton	2000–01	Premier League	9	0	0	0	1	0	—		—		10	0
Everton	Total		18	1	0	0	1	0	—		—		19	1
Blackburn Rovers	2000–01	First Division	29	5	5	0	0	0	—		—		34	5
Blackburn Rovers	2001–02	Premier League	21	1	3	0	6	1	—		—		30	2
Blackburn Rovers	Total		50	6	8	0	6	1	—		—		64	7
Career total			606	164	77	27	60	20	45	11	12	2	799	224

=== International ===
Appearances and goals by national team and year
National team	Year	Apps	Goals
Wales	1984	5	3
Wales	1985	6	3
Wales	1986	1	0
Wales	1987	5	1
Wales	1988	5	1
Wales	1989	5	0
Wales	1990	4	1
Wales	1991	7	0
Wales	1992	8	1
Wales	1993	6	2
Wales	1994	3	0
Wales	1995	3	0
Wales	1996	5	4
Wales	1997	3	0
Wales	1998	3	0
Wales	1999	3	0
Total		72	16

Wales score listed first, score column indicates score after each Hughes goal.

List of international goals scored by Mark Hughes
No.	Date	Venue	Opponent	Score	Result	Competition
1	2 May 1984	Racecourse Ground, Wrexham, Wales	England	1–0	1–0	1983–84 British Home Championship
2	22 May 1984	Vetch Field, Swansea, Wales	Northern Ireland	1–0	1–1	1983–84 British Home Championship
3	14 November 1984	Ninian Park, Cardiff, Wales	Iceland	2–1	2–1	1986 FIFA World Cup qualification
4	30 April 1985	Racecourse Ground, Wrexham, Wales	Spain	2–0	3–0	1986 FIFA World Cup qualification
5	5 June 1985	Brann Stadion, Bergen, Norway	Norway	2–4	2–4	Friendly
6	10 September 1985	Ninian Park, Cardiff, Wales	Scotland	1–0	1–1	1986 FIFA World Cup qualification
7	9 September 1987	Ninian Park, Cardiff, Wales	Denmark	1–0	1–0	UEFA Euro 1988 qualification
8	1 June 1988	Ta' Qali National Stadium, Valletta, Malta	Malta	2–2	3–2	Friendly
9	17 October 1990	Ninian Park, Cardiff, Wales	Belgium	3–1	3–1	UEFA Euro 1992 qualification
10	14 October 1992	Tsirion Stadium, Limassol, Cyprus	Cyprus	1–0	1–0	1994 FIFA World Cup qualification
11	17 February 1993	Tolka Park, Dublin, Republic of Ireland	Republic of Ireland	1–0	1–2	Friendly
12	28 April 1993	Bazaly, Ostrava, Czech Republic	RCS	1–0	1–1	1994 FIFA World Cup qualification
13	2 June 1996	Stadio Olimpico, Serravalle, San Marino	San Marino	2–0	5–0	1998 FIFA World Cup qualification
14	2 June 1996	Stadio Olimpico, Serravalle, San Marino	San Marino	3–0	5–0	1998 FIFA World Cup qualification
15	31 August 1996	Cardiff Arms Park, Cardiff, Wales	San Marino	2–0	6–0	1998 FIFA World Cup qualification
16	31 August 1996	Cardiff Arms Park, Cardiff, Wales	San Marino	5–0	6–0	1998 FIFA World Cup qualification

== Managerial statistics ==
As of match played 3 May 2026

Managerial record by team and tenure
Team	From	To	Record					Ref.
Team	From	To	P	W	D	L	Win %	Ref.
Wales	3 August 1999	13 October 2004	41	12	15	14	29.3	
Blackburn Rovers	15 September 2004	4 June 2008	188	82	47	59	43.6	
Manchester City	4 June 2008	19 December 2009	77	36	16	25	46.8	
Fulham	29 July 2010	2 June 2011	43	14	16	13	32.6	
Queens Park Rangers	10 January 2012	23 November 2012	34	8	6	20	23.5	
Stoke City	30 May 2013	6 January 2018	200	71	48	81	35.5	
Southampton	14 March 2018	3 December 2018	27	5	10	12	18.5	
Bradford City	24 February 2022	4 October 2023	82	31	26	25	37.8	
Carlisle United	6 February 2025	28 May 2026	70	37	14	19	52.9	
Total			762	296	198	268	38.8	

== Honours ==
=== Player ===
Manchester United

- Premier League: 1992–93, 1993–94
- FA Cup: 1984–85, 1989–90, 1993–94
- Football League Cup: 1991–92
- FA Charity Shield: 1990, 1993, 1994
- European Cup Winners' Cup: 1990–91
- European Super Cup: 1991

Chelsea

- FA Cup: 1996–97
- Football League Cup: 1997–98
- UEFA Cup Winners' Cup: 1997–98

Blackburn Rovers

- Football League Cup: 2001–02

Individual

- PFA Young Player of the Year: 1984–85
- PFA Players' Player of the Year: 1988–89, 1990–91
- PFA First Division Team of the Year: 1985–86, 1988–89, 1990–91, 1991–92
- Sir Matt Busby Player of the Year: 1990–91
- Welsh Footballer of the Year: 1993, 1994
- Chelsea Player of the Year: 1996–97
- Inducted into English Football Hall of Fame
- BBC Wales Sports Personality of the Year: 2002

=== Manager ===
Individual

- Premier League Manager of the Month: October 2007
- National League Manager of the Month: October 2025
