= Wayne Heseltine =

English footballer

Personal information
- Full name: Wayne Alan Heseltine
- Date of birth: 3 December 1969 (age 56)
- Place of birth: Bradford, England
- Position: Full back

Youth career
- 1987–1989: Manchester United

Senior career*
Years	Team	Apps	(Gls)
1989–1992	Oldham Athletic	1	(0)
1992–1994	Bradford City	54	(1)
1994–????	Guiseley	?	(?)
Total		55	(1)
- * Club domestic league appearances and goals

Wayne Alan Heseltine (born 3 December 1969) is an English former professional footballer who played as a full back.

== Career ==
Heseltine was born in Bradford, and began his career with the youth team of Manchester United, but never made a first-team appearance. He left to join Oldham Athletic in December 1989 for a fee of £40,000, moving onto Bradford City in August 1992 on a free transfer, having made only one appearance in the Football League. Heseltine spent a further two years at Bradford City, making 54 appearances in the League, before playing non-league football with Guiseley.
