= George Switzer =

English footballer

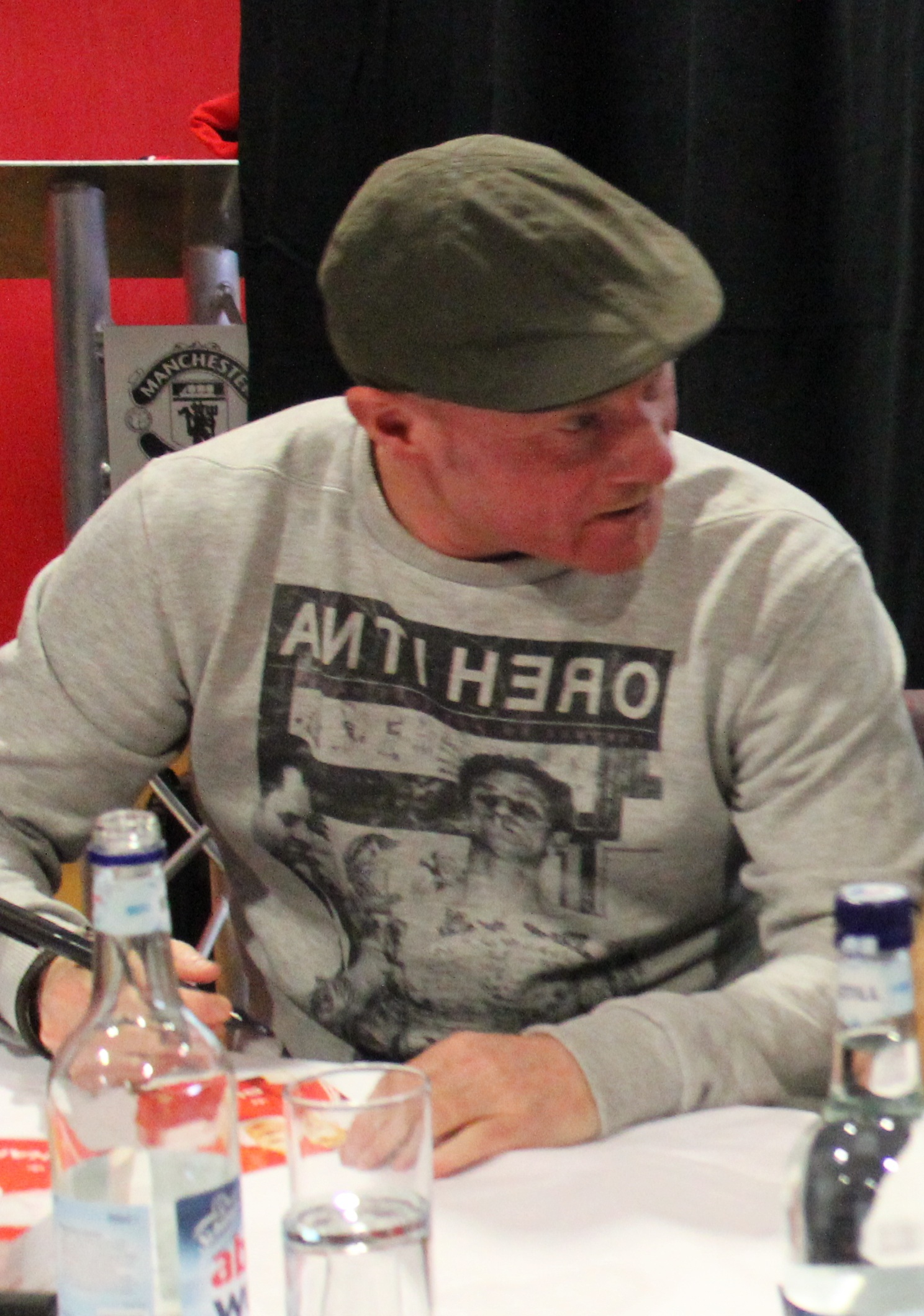

Personal information
- Date of birth: 13 October 1973 (age 53)
- Place of birth: Salford, Lancashire, England
- Position: Left-back

Team information
- Current team: Salford United

Youth career
- 1982–1992: Manchester United

Senior career*
Years	Team	Apps	(Gls)
1992–1993	Manchester United	0	(0)
1993–1994	Darlington	14	(0)
1994–2000	Hyde United	139	(3)
?–2006	Salford City	?	(?)
2006–2008	Irlam	?	(?)
2008–2013	AFC Monton	?	(?)
- * Club domestic league appearances and goals

George Switzer (born 13 October 1973) is an English former footballer most famous for being part of Manchester United's 1992 FA Youth Cup-winning team. A left-back, Switzer played for Darlington, Hyde United, Salford City, Irlam and AFC Monton before his retirement in 2013.

== Career ==
Born in Salford, Lancashire, Switzer began his career as a youth player at Manchester United, having joined the club in 1982 after being spotted playing for the local Barrhill Lads Club when he was only eight years old. Switzer was part of the United youth team that won the FA Youth Cup in 1992, playing with future United stars such as Gary Neville, Ryan Giggs, David Beckham and Paul Scholes. Following on from this success, Switzer was offered a professional contract with the Red Devils; however, unlike his team-mates, who received multi-year deals, Switzer was only offered one year. Switzer was released at the end of the 1992–93 season.

Switzer then signed for Darlington on a free transfer in July 1993. However, Switzer only played for the Quakers for one season, failing to hold down a regular place, before being given another free transfer in the summer of 1994. He then signed for Hyde United in the Northern Premier League, and played for them for six years from 1994 to 2000, making over 200 appearances for the East Manchester team. Since then, Switzer has played for Salford City, but left his home-town club in 2006 to sign for Irlam. After a short time there, he signed for AFC Monton.

== Personal life ==
Outside of football, Switzer has had a number of careers, including working as an optical technician for Dolland & Aitchison at their factory in Salford. George currently enjoys his life outside of football. He occasionally attends signing events and works for a Salford electrical wholesaler called H&S Electrical.
