= 1989–90 FA Cup =

Tournament details
- Country: England; Wales

Final positions
- Champions: Manchester United (7th title)
- Runners-up: Crystal Palace

Tournament statistics
- Top goal scorer: Ian Rush (6)

The 1989–90 FA Cup was the 109th season of the world's oldest football knockout competition, the Football Association Challenge Cup, or FA Cup for short. The competition started in September 1989 with the Preliminary Round and continued through to the Final Replay in May 1990 in which Manchester United defeated Crystal Palace.

== Qualifying rounds ==
Most participating clubs that were not members of the Football League competed in the qualifying rounds to secure one of 28 places available in the first round.

The winners from the fourth qualifying round were Northwich Victoria, Billingham Synthonia, Whitley Bay, Marine, Tow Law Town, Darlington, Congleton Town, Bishop Auckland, Stafford Rangers, Redditch United, Halesowen Town, Kidderminster Harriers, Welling United, Slough Town, Farnborough Town, Dartford, Matlock Town, Barnet, Aylesbury United, Bromsgrove Rovers, Merthyr Tydfil, Dorchester Town, Hayes, Basingstoke Town, Gloucester City, Woking, Yeovil Town and Bath City.

Appearing in the competition proper for the first time were Whitley Bay and Congleton Town. Of the others, Dorchester Town had last featured at this stage in 1981–82, Matlock Town had last done so in 1976-77, Marine had last done so in 1975-76, Redditch United and Basingstoke Town had last done so in 1971-72 and Gloucester City had not done so since 1950-51.

Meanwhile, Darlington matched the achievements of Lincoln City two seasons previously in winning promotion back to the Football League at the first attempt after being relegated to the Football Conference. The Quakers managed to hold off a challenge from Barnet to take the Conference championship, and advanced to the third round of the FA Cup where Fourth Division Cambridge United needed a replay to end their run.

== First round proper ==
The 48 teams from the Football League Third and Fourth Divisions entered in this round along with the 28 non-league clubs from the qualifying rounds and Telford United, Macclesfield Town, Kettering Town and Sutton United who were given byes. The first round of games was played over the weekend 17–19 November 1989, with a first round of replays being played on the 21st–22nd. The Bristol Rovers–Reading match went to a second replay, on the 27th. Billingham Synthonia and Tow Law Town, from the Northern League at Step 8 of English football, were the lowest-ranked teams in the round.

Tie no	Home team	Score	Away team	Date
1	Blackpool	2–1	Bolton Wanderers	18 November 1989
2	Darlington (5)	6–2	Northwich Victoria (5)	18 November 1989
3	Dartford (6)	1–1	Exeter City	18 November 1989
Replay	Exeter City	4–1	Dartford	22 November 1989
4	Bath City (6)	2–2	Fulham	19 November 1989
Replay	Fulham	2–1	Bath City	22 November 1989
5	Bristol City	2–0	Barnet (5)	18 November 1989
6	Burnley	1–1	Stockport County	18 November 1989
Replay	Stockport County	1–2	Burnley	22 November 1989
7	Preston North End	1–0	Tranmere Rovers	18 November 1989
8	Sutton United (5)	1–1	Torquay United	18 November 1989
Replay	Torquay United	4–0	Sutton United	22 November 1989
9	Marine (6)	0–1	Rochdale	17 November 1989
10	Gillingham	0–0	Welling United (5)	18 November 1989
Replay	Welling United	1–0	Gillingham	22 November 1989
11	Macclesfield Town (5)	1–1	Chester City	18 November 1989
Replay	Chester City	3–2	Macclesfield Town	21 November 1989
12	Crewe Alexandra	2–0	Congleton Town (7)	18 November 1989
13	Lincoln City	1–0	Billingham Synthonia (8)	18 November 1989
14	Stafford Rangers (5)	2–3	Halifax Town	18 November 1989
15	Scarborough	0–1	Whitley Bay (7)	18 November 1989
16	Shrewsbury Town	2–3	Chesterfield	18 November 1989
17	Doncaster Rovers	1–0	Notts County	18 November 1989
18	Bishop Auckland (6)	2–0	Tow Law Town (8)	18 November 1989
19	Kidderminster Harriers (5)	2–3	Swansea City	18 November 1989
20	Aylesbury United (6)	1–0	Southend United	18 November 1989
21	Brentford	0–1	Colchester United	18 November 1989
22	Bristol Rovers	1–1	Reading	18 November 1989
Replay	Reading	1–1	Bristol Rovers	21 November 1989
Replay	Bristol Rovers	0–1	Reading	27 November 1989
23	Maidstone United	2–1	Yeovil Town (5)	19 November 1989
24	Carlisle United	3–0	Wrexham	18 November 1989
25	Scunthorpe United	4–1	Matlock Town (6)	18 November 1989
26	Cardiff City	1–0	Halesowen Town (7)	18 November 1989
27	York City	1–2	Grimsby Town	18 November 1989
28	Kettering Town (5)	0–1	Northampton Town	18 November 1989
29	Rotherham United	0–0	Bury	18 November 1989
Replay	Bury	1–2	Rotherham United	21 November 1989
30	Aldershot	0–1	Cambridge United	17 November 1989
31	Gloucester City (6)	1–0	Dorchester Town (6)	18 November 1989
32	Wigan Athletic	2–0	Mansfield Town	19 November 1989
33	Peterborough United	1–1	Hayes (6)	18 November 1989
Replay	Hayes	0–1	Peterborough United	21 November 1989
34	Leyton Orient	0–1	Birmingham City	18 November 1989
35	Basingstoke Town (6)	3–0	Bromsgrove Rovers (6)	18 November 1989
36	Slough Town (6)	1–2	Woking (7)	18 November 1989
37	Telford United (5)	0–3	Walsall	18 November 1989
38	Redditch United (7)	1–3	Merthyr Tydfil (5)	18 November 1989
39	Farnborough Town (5)	0–1	Hereford United	18 November 1989
40	Hartlepool United	0–2	Huddersfield Town	18 November 1989

== Second round proper ==
The second round of games was played on 9 December 1989, with the first round of replays being played on the 12th–13th. Two games went to second replays and one of these went to a third replay. The round featured two teams from Step 7 of the English football system: Whitley Bay from the Northern Premier League First Division, and Woking from the Isthmian League First Division.

Tie no	Home team	Score	Away team	Date
1	Blackpool	3–0	Chester City	9 December 1989
2	Chesterfield	0–2	Huddersfield Town	9 December 1989
3	Darlington (5)	3–0	Halifax Town	9 December 1989
4	Bristol City	2–1	Fulham	9 December 1989
5	Rochdale	3–0	Lincoln City	9 December 1989
6	Reading	0–0	Welling United (5)	9 December 1989
Replay	Welling United	1–1	Reading	13 December 1989
Replay	Reading	0–0	Welling United	19 December 1989
Replay	Welling United	1–2	Reading	22 December 1989
7	Walsall	1–0	Rotherham United	9 December 1989
8	Grimsby Town	1–0	Doncaster Rovers	9 December 1989
9	Crewe Alexandra	1–1	Bishop Auckland (6)	9 December 1989
Replay	Bishop Auckland	0–2	Crewe Alexandra	13 December 1989
10	Maidstone United	1–1	Exeter City	9 December 1989
Replay	Exeter City	3–2	Maidstone United	13 December 1989
11	Northampton Town	0–0	Aylesbury United (6)	9 December 1989
Replay	Aylesbury United	0–1	Northampton Town	13 December 1989
12	Whitley Bay (7)	2–0	Preston North End	9 December 1989
13	Scunthorpe United	2–2	Burnley	9 December 1989
Replay	Burnley	1–1	Scunthorpe United	12 December 1989
Replay	Burnley	5–0	Scunthorpe United	18 December 1989
14	Cardiff City	2–2	Gloucester City (6)	9 December 1989
Replay	Gloucester City	0–1	Cardiff City	12 December 1989
15	Hereford United	3–2	Merthyr Tydfil (5)	9 December 1989
16	Wigan Athletic	2–0	Carlisle United	9 December 1989
17	Colchester United	0–2	Birmingham City	9 December 1989
18	Basingstoke Town (6)	2–3	Torquay United	9 December 1989
19	Cambridge United	3–1	Woking (7)	9 December 1989
20	Swansea City	3–1	Peterborough United	9 December 1989

== Third round proper ==
Teams from the Football League First and Second Division entered in this round. The third round of games in the FA Cup was played over the weekend 6–7 January 1990, with the first set of replays being played on the 9th–10th. Two games went to second replays, which were completed during the following week. Whitley Bay (Step 7) was again the lowest-ranked team in the draw, and they and Darlington were the last non-league clubs left in the competition.

Tie no	Home team	Score	Away team	Date
1	Blackpool (3)	1–0	Burnley (4)	6 January 1990
2	Bristol City (3)	2–1	Swindon Town (2)	6 January 1990
3	Rochdale (4)	1–0	Whitley Bay (7)	6 January 1990
4	Watford (2)	2–0	Wigan Athletic (3)	6 January 1990
5	Reading (3)	2–1	Sunderland (2)	6 January 1990
6	Leicester City (2)	1–2	Barnsley (2)	6 January 1990
7	Nottingham Forest (1)	0–1	Manchester United (1)	7 January 1990
8	Blackburn Rovers (2)	2–2	Aston Villa (1)	6 January 1990
Replay	Aston Villa	3–1	Blackburn Rovers	10 January 1990
9	Wolverhampton Wanderers (2)	1–2	Sheffield Wednesday (1)	6 January 1990
10	Middlesbrough (2)	0–0	Everton (1)	6 January 1990
Replay	Everton	1–1	Middlesbrough	10 January 1990
Replay	Everton	1–0	Middlesbrough	17 January 1990
11	West Bromwich Albion (2)	2–0	Wimbledon (1)	6 January 1990
12	Sheffield United (2)	2–0	AFC Bournemouth (2)	6 January 1990
13	Tottenham Hotspur (1)	1–3	Southampton (1)	6 January 1990
14	Manchester City (1)	0–0	Millwall (1)	6 January 1990
Replay	Millwall	1–1	Manchester City	9 January 1990
Replay	Millwall	3–1	Manchester City	15 January 1990
15	Northampton Town (3)	1–0	Coventry City (1)	6 January 1990
16	Brighton & Hove Albion (2)	4–1	Luton Town (1)	6 January 1990
17	Plymouth Argyle (2)	0–1	Oxford United (2)	6 January 1990
18	Hull City (2)	0–1	Newcastle United (2)	6 January 1990
19	Crystal Palace (1)	2–1	Portsmouth (2)	6 January 1990
20	Chelsea (1)	1–1	Crewe Alexandra (3)	6 January 1990
Replay	Crewe Alexandra	0–2	Chelsea	10 January 1990
21	Exeter City (4)	1–1	Norwich City (1)	6 January 1990
Replay	Norwich City	2–0	Exeter City	10 January 1990
22	Huddersfield Town (3)	3–1	Grimsby Town (4)	6 January 1990
23	Cardiff City (3)	0–0	Queens Park Rangers (1)	6 January 1990
Replay	Queens Park Rangers	2–0	Cardiff City	10 January 1990
24	Port Vale (2)	1–1	Derby County (1)	7 January 1990
Replay	Derby County	2–3	Port Vale	10 January 1990
25	Charlton Athletic (1)	1–1	Bradford City (2)	7 January 1990
Replay	Bradford City	0–3	Charlton Athletic	10 January 1990
26	Leeds United (2)	0–1	Ipswich Town (2)	6 January 1990
27	Torquay United (4)	1–0	West Ham United (2)	6 January 1990
28	Hereford United (4)	2–1	Walsall (3)	6 January 1990
29	Stoke City (2)	0–1	Arsenal (1)	6 January 1990
30	Birmingham City (3)	1–1	Oldham Athletic (2)	6 January 1990
Replay	Oldham Athletic	1–0	Birmingham City	10 January 1990
31	Cambridge United (4)	0–0	Darlington (5)	6 January 1990
Replay	Darlington	1–3	Cambridge United	9 January 1990
32	Swansea City (3)	0–0	Liverpool (1)	6 January 1990
Replay	Liverpool	8–0	Swansea City	9 January 1990

== Fourth round proper ==
The fourth round of games was played over the weekend 27–28 January 1990, with replays being played on the 30th–31st. Fourth Division sides Rochdale, Torquay United, Hereford United and Cambridge United were the lowest-ranked teams in the draw.

Tie no	Home team	Score	Away team	Date
1	Blackpool	1–0	Torquay United	27 January 1990
2	Bristol City	3–1	Chelsea	27 January 1990
3	Rochdale	3–0	Northampton Town	27 January 1990
4	Southampton	1–0	Oxford United	27 January 1990
5	Reading	3–3	Newcastle United	27 January 1990
Replay	Newcastle United	4–1	Reading	31 January 1990
6	Aston Villa	6–0	Port Vale	27 January 1990
7	Sheffield Wednesday	1–2	Everton	28 January 1990
8	West Bromwich Albion	1–0	Charlton Athletic	27 January 1990
9	Sheffield United	1–1	Watford	27 January 1990
Replay	Watford	1–2	Sheffield United	30 January 1990
10	Barnsley	2–0	Ipswich Town	27 January 1990
11	Norwich City	0–0	Liverpool	28 January 1990
Replay	Liverpool	3–1	Norwich City	31 January 1990
12	Millwall	1–1	Cambridge United	27 January 1990
Replay	Cambridge United	1–0	Millwall	30 January 1990
13	Oldham Athletic	2–1	Brighton & Hove Albion	27 January 1990
14	Crystal Palace	4–0	Huddersfield Town	27 January 1990
15	Arsenal	0–0	Queens Park Rangers	27 January 1990
Replay	Queens Park Rangers	2–0	Arsenal	31 January 1990
16	Hereford United	0–1	Manchester United	28 January 1990

== Fifth round proper ==
The fifth set of games was played over the weekend 17–18 February 1990, with a first round of replays being played on the 21st. Each of these finished in a draw, meaning a second round of replays had to be completed. Rochdale and Cambridge United were again the lowest-ranked teams in the round.

Tie no	Home team	Score	Away team	Date
1	Blackpool	2–2	Queens Park Rangers	18 February 1990
Replay	Queens Park Rangers	0–0	Blackpool	21 February 1990
Replay	Queens Park Rangers	3–0	Blackpool	26 February 1990
2	Bristol City	0–0	Cambridge United	17 February 1990
Replay	Cambridge United	1–1	Bristol City	21 February 1990
Replay	Cambridge United	5–1	Bristol City	27 February 1990
3	Liverpool	3–0	Southampton	17 February 1990
4	West Bromwich Albion	0–2	Aston Villa	17 February 1990
5	Sheffield United	2–2	Barnsley	18 February 1990
Replay	Barnsley	0–0	Sheffield United	21 February 1990
Replay	Barnsley	0–1	Sheffield United	5 March 1990
6	Newcastle United	2–3	Manchester United	18 February 1990
7	Oldham Athletic	2–2	Everton	17 February 1990
Replay	Everton	1–1	Oldham Athletic	21 February 1990
Replay	Oldham Athletic	2–1	Everton	10 March 1990
8	Crystal Palace	1–0	Rochdale	17 February 1990

== Sixth round proper ==
Most of the sixth round of FA Cup games were played over the weekend 10–11 March 1990, with the Oldham Athletic – Aston Villa game and the Liverpool – QPR replay being played on the 14th.

Alex Ferguson continued to defy the odds with a Manchester United side that was struggling in the league but performing wonders in the cup, as they defeated Sheffield United 1–0.

Liverpool built up their hopes of a unique second double (which had eluded them in dramatic fashion during the previous two seasons) by beating QPR in a quarter-final replay.

Aston Villa's double hopes were ended when they crashed 3–0 to an Oldham Athletic team that hadn't played top-division football since 1923.

Cambridge United was the last club from the First Round left in the competition, but their hopes of becoming the first Fourth Division team to reach the FA Cup semi-finals were ended with a 1–0 defeat at home to Crystal Palace, who moved closer to a first FA Cup final but were first faced with the task of overcoming a Liverpool side that had crushed them 9–0 in the league earlier in the season.

Tie no	Home team	Score	Away team	Date
1	Sheffield United	0–1	Manchester United	11 March 1990
2	Queens Park Rangers	2–2	Liverpool	11 March 1990
Replay	Liverpool	1–0	Queens Park Rangers	14 March 1990
3	Oldham Athletic	3–0	Aston Villa	14 March 1990
4	Cambridge United	0–1	Crystal Palace	10 March 1990

== Semi-finals ==
The semi-final matches were played on 8 April 1990.

Seven months after losing 9–0 to them in a league game, Crystal Palace found a 10-goal improvement to defeat Liverpool 4–3 and give them their first FA Cup final appearance as well as ending their opposition's hopes of a second double – the third season running that Liverpool had suffered a late blow to their double hopes.

Oldham Athletic, a Second Division side, opened the scoring against Manchester United through Earl Barrett in a game that eventually ended 3–3, forcing a replay. United won the replay 2–1.

8 April 1990
12:00

Crystal Palace	4–3 (a.e.t.)	Liverpool
Bright 46'; O'Reilly 70'; Gray 88'; Pardew 109'	Report	Rush 14'; McMahon 81'; Barnes 83' (pen.)

Villa Park, Birmingham
Attendance: 38,389
Referee: George Courtney (Spennymoor, County Durham)

8 April 1990
15:30

Manchester United	3–3 (a.e.t.)	Oldham Athletic
Robson 29'; Webb 72'; Wallace 92'	Report	Barrett 5'; Marshall 75'; Palmer 113'

Maine Road, Manchester
Attendance: 44,026
Referee: Joe Worrall (Cheshire)

11 April 1990
19:45

Oldham Athletic	1–2 (a.e.t.)	Manchester United
Ritchie 81'	Report	McClair 50'; Robins 114'

Maine Road, Manchester
Attendance: 35,005
Referee: Joe Worrall (Cheshire)

== Final ==
Crystal Palace, playing in their first FA Cup final, took on a Manchester United side that already had six FA Cups to its name, and a thrilling game ended 3–3 with Palace taking the lead twice and United once before a late equaliser by Mark Hughes (his second goal of the game) forced a replay.

12 May 1990

Manchester United	3–3 (a.e.t.)	Crystal Palace
Robson 35'; Hughes 62', 109'		O'Reilly 18'; Wright 72', 92'

Wembley Stadium, London
Attendance: 80,000
Referee: Allan Gunn (Sussex)

Manchester United	Crystal Palace

=== Replay ===
Lee Martin, a 22-year-old defender who nearly did not play due to Alex Ferguson's doubts about his fitness, scored the winning goal as Manchester United sealed their first major trophy in five years and their first under Ferguson's management, ending months of speculation that his job was at risk due to dismal league performances.

Crystal Palace were controversially denied a clear penalty by Allan Gunn, a referee from Brighton - who instead awarded a free-kick outside the penalty area.

Les Sealey played in goal for Manchester United, following Jim Leighton’s poor performance in the first match.

17 May 1990

Manchester United	1–0	Crystal Palace
Martin 59'

Wembley Stadium, London
Attendance: 80,000
Referee: Allan Gunn (Sussex)

Manchester United	Crystal Palace

== Media coverage ==
For the second consecutive season in the United Kingdom, the BBC were the free to air broadcasters.

The matches shown live on the BBC were: Nottingham Forest vs Manchester United (R3); Norwich City vs Liverpool (R4); Newcastle United vs Manchester United (R5); Queens Park Rangers vs Liverpool (QF); both Crystal Palace vs Liverpool and Manchester United vs Oldham Athletic (SF); Manchester United vs Oldham Athletic (SF replay); and Crystal Palace vs Manchester United in both the Final and its replay.

This was the first season to feature both semi-finals being televised live in full; they were shown on the same Sunday afternoon with an EastEnders omnibus edition scheduled in between, though this was altered when the Liverpool vs Crystal Palace match required extra time. The semi-final replay, shown on the following Wednesday evening, coincided with ITV showing the First Division match between Arsenal and Aston Villa. This was the first occasion on which BBC1 and ITV had shown different English club matches on the same evening. The cup replay kicked off at 19:45, with the league match kicking off twenty minutes later at 20:05, with the cup replay having to allow for the possibility of extra time, meaning viewers may have changed channels in time to see Aston Villa's Chris Price score the only goal.
