= Lee Martin (footballer, born February 1968) =

English footballer (born 1968)

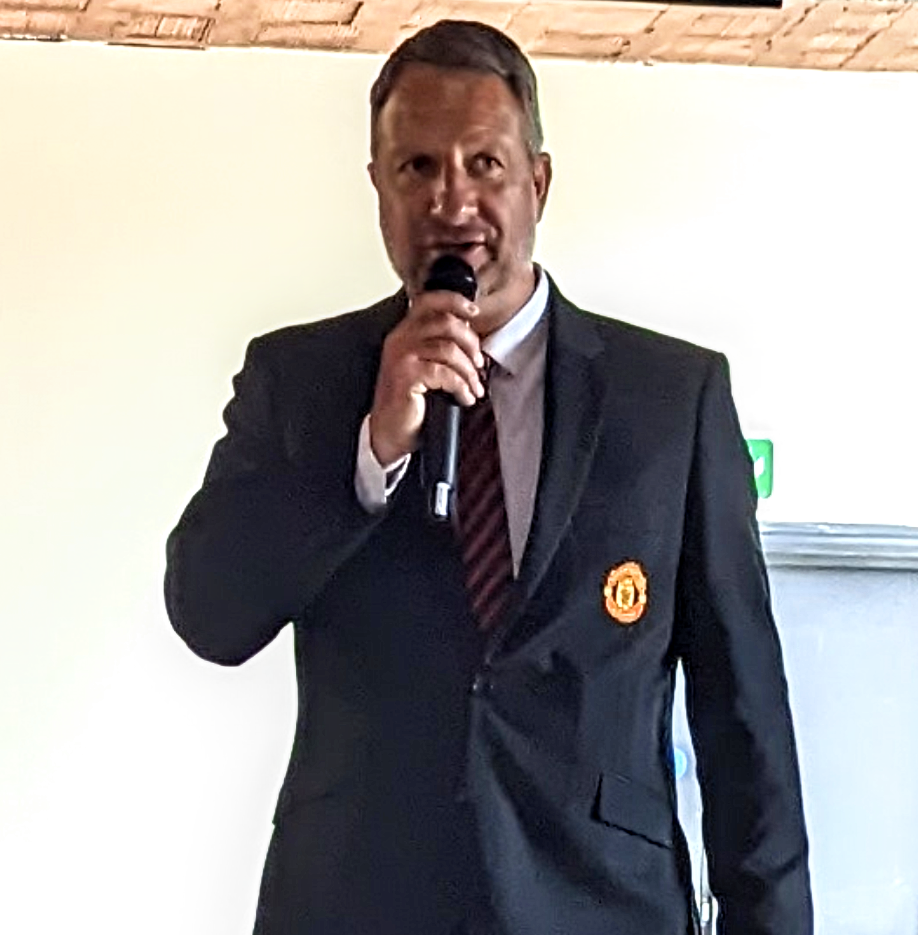
- Lee Martin in 2023

Personal information
- Full name: Lee Andrew Martin
- Date of birth: 5 February 1968 (age 58)
- Place of birth: Hyde, Cheshire, England
- Height: 1.80 m (5 ft 11 in)
- Position: Left back

Youth career
- 1982–1988: Manchester United

Senior career*
Years	Team	Apps	(Gls)
1988–1994	Manchester United	73	(1)
1994–1996	Celtic	19	(0)
1996–1998	Bristol Rovers	25	(0)
1997	→ Huddersfield Town (loan)	3	(0)
1998–1999	Glossop North End		
2005–2006	Bangor City	8	(1)
2006–2008	NEWI Cefn Druids	9	(0)
Total		127	(2)

International career
1989	England U21	2	(0)
- * Club domestic league appearances and goals

Lee Andrew Martin (born 5 February 1968) is an English former football left back. He played with Manchester United, Celtic and Bristol Rovers, among others. He represented his country at under 21 level.

== Playing career ==
Martin started his career in the Manchester United youth system. In 1990, he scored the only goal in the FA Cup final replay against Crystal Palace. This was one of just two goals Martin scored in his entire United career. The other goal, his first, came 16 months earlier in the 3–1 defeat of West Ham at Upton Park.

His debut came on 9 May 1988 as a substitute in a 2–1 home league win over Wimbledon and he made his breakthrough at left back the following season following the departure of Arthur Albiston. By the time of his first United goal, in a 3–1 win at West Ham United in the league of 21 January 1989, he was a regular feature in the United squad.

He played in 32 out of 38 league games in the cup winning 1989–90 campaign, but managed just 14 league games the following season as Clayton Blackmore established himself as United's regular left-back, with Denis Irwin joining as a right-back, and Martin struggled against a back injury.

He did not make the squad for the side that won the European Cup Winners Cup a year later, although he did play in multiple games en route to the final. The arrival of Paul Parker that summer increased the competition for full-back places.

He managed just one league appearance in 1991–92 and did not make the squad for the Football League Cup winning team. However, he did collect a European Super Cup winner's medal on 19 November 1991 when he featured in their 1–0 triumph over Red Star Belgrade at Old Trafford, though he was substituted in the 71st minute in favour of Ryan Giggs.

He failed to make a single league appearance in 1992–93 season, when they won the first FA Premier League title. His final league appearance came on 23 October 1993 in a 1–0 Premier League win over Everton at Goodison Park, as United were on course for retaining the league title. They also went on to win the FA Cup that season. 1993–94 saw the introduction of squad numbers in the Premier League, and Martin made one appearance in the number 21 shirt. His final competitive appearance for the club was on 27 October 1993 in a 5–1 home win over Leicester City in the third round of the League Cup.

Towards the end of his time at Manchester United, Martin regularly captained the reserve side.

Martin played a total of 108 games and scored two goals for United before he left Old Trafford in January 1994 to join Celtic, where he suffered a broken leg within months of his arrival. He played just 19 times in the league in more than two years as Celtic failed to overhaul Rangers, who were league champions of Scotland in each of three seasons that Martin spent north of the border. Celtic's only major honour during Martin's time there was the Scottish FA Cup in 1995, but he didn't make the squad for that game.

He finally left Celtic in 1996 and signed for Bristol Rovers, from where he later had a loan spell with Huddersfield Town. He retired from professional football in 1998.

He then moved to the semi-professional League of Wales team Bangor City, Glossop North End and then to NEWI Cefn Druids in 2006.

Martin retired from football in 2008, and works with young people helping them to gain qualifications, access college and get apprenticeships or employment in the West Cheshire area.

He also helps with the coaching of the Chester FC under 16's youth team. He also works for Manchester United Television at Old Trafford.

== Honours ==
Manchester United

- FA Cup: 1989–90
- European Cup Winners' Cup: 1990–91
- UEFA Super Cup: 1991

Individual

- Jimmy Murphy Young Player of the Year: 1989–90
