= Ian Wilkinson (footballer) =

English footballer

Ian Wilkinson (born 2 July 1973) is an English former professional footballer who was a goalkeeper for Manchester United in the early 1990s. He made one first-team appearance, in the League Cup at Cambridge United.

He also played for Stockport County and Crewe Alexandra.

After sustaining a detached retina, he retired from football and trained to be a physiotherapist. He obtained his degree in Physiotherapy from the University of Salford in 1998.

In 2002, he decided to train as a doctor in Newcastle and did a four-year medical degree. He has subsequently worked in Bolton, Salford and Wigan as a General Practitioner and in Accident and Emergency.
