= 2001–02 Bradford City A.F.C. season =

Bradford City
2001-02 season
- Chairman: Geoffrey Richmond
- Manager: Jim Jefferies (until 24 December); Steve Smith (caretaker); Nicky Law (from 1 January)
- Stadium: Valley Parade
- First Division: 15th
- FA Cup: Third round
- League Cup: Third round
- Top goalscorer: League: Eoin Jess (14); All: Eoin Jess (14)

During the 2001–02 English football season, Bradford City competed in the First Division.

== Season summary ==
In the 2001–02 season, Bradford had high hopes of a return to the top flight following relegation last season, but it did not materialise, and on 24 December after an inconsistent run of results, boss Jim Jefferies resigned much to the chairman's fury, who branded Jefferies a "quitter". Chesterfield boss Nicky Law was then installed as their new manager on 1 January on a two-and-a-half-year contract and his assistant Ian Banks joined amongst the coaching staff. Results didn't improve too much though and Bradford ended up finishing in a disappointing 15th place.

== Kit ==
Bradford City's kit was manufactured by the club's own brand, BCFC Leisure, and sponsored by Bradford-based car dealership JCT600.

== League table ==
Pos	Team	Pld	W	D	L	GF	GA	GD	Pts
13	Sheffield United	46	15	15	16	53	54	−1	60
14	Watford	46	16	11	19	62	56	+6	59
15	Bradford City	46	15	10	21	69	76	−7	55
16	Nottingham Forest	46	12	18	16	50	51	−1	54
17	Portsmouth	46	13	14	19	60	72	−12	53

Rules for classification: 1) Points; 2) Goal difference; 3) Goals scored

Results summary

Overall								Home						Away					
Pld	W	D	L	GF	GA	GD	Pts	W	D	L	GF	GA	GD	W	D	L	GF	GA	GD
46	15	10	21	69	76	−7	55	10	1	12	41	39	+2	5	9	9	28	37	−9

Source: 2001-02 Football League First Division table

Results by round

Round	1	2	3	4	5	6	7	8	9	10	11	12	13	14	15	16	17	18	19	20	21	22	23	24	25	26	27	28	29	30	31	32	33	34	35	36	37	38	39	40	41	42	43	44	45	46
Ground	H	A	H	H	A	H	A	A	H	H	H	A	A	A	H	H	A	A	H	A	A	H	H	A	A	H	H	H	A	H	A	A	A	H	H	A	H	H	A	A	H	A	H	A	H	A
Result	W	W	W	L	D	W	D	L	L	W	L	L	L	L	W	D	D	W	W	D	L	L	W	L	L	L	L	W	D	L	W	L	W	W	L	L	L	L	D	D	W	D	L	W	L	D
Position	2	1	1	4	6	2	2	5	9	8	9	12	14	15	13	13	13	12	11	11	11	15	12	15	16	17	17	17	16	16	17	17	16	16	16	17	17	17	17	17	17	15	16	15	16	15

Source: 11v11.com: 2001-02 Bradford City results
A = Away; H = Home; W = Win; D = Draw; L = Loss

== Results ==
Bradford City's score comes first

=== Legend ===
Win	Draw	Loss

=== Football League First Division ===
Date	Opponent	Venue	Result	Attendance	Scorers
11 August 2001	Barnsley	H	4–0	16,367	Ward (2 pens), Jess, Carbone
18 August 2001	Portsmouth	A	1–0	17,239	Jess
24 August 2001	Coventry City	H	2–1	15,085	Myers, Locke
2 September 2001	Burnley	H	2–3	17,547	Ward, McCall
8 September 2001	Sheffield United	A	2–2	17,394	Jess, Tod
14 September 2001	Gillingham	H	5–1	14,101	Wetherall, Tod, Jess, Blake, Carbone
17 September 2001	Sheffield Wednesday	A	1–1	18,012	Carbone
20 September 2001	Nottingham Forest	A	0–1	28,546	
25 September 2001	Stockport County	H	2–4	12,940	Carbone, Myers
29 September 2001	Grimsby Town	H	3–2	13,778	Blake, Jess, Ward
13 October 2001	Wolverhampton Wanderers	H	0–3	16,878	
16 October 2001	Crystal Palace	A	0–2	15,721	
20 October 2001	Birmingham City	A	0–4	25,011	
23 October 2001	Millwall	A	1–3	11,071	Locke
27 October 2001	Watford	H	4–3	16,860	Etherington, Jess (3)
30 October 2001	Wimbledon	H	3–3	18,255	Tod (2), Jess
2 November 2001	Crewe Alexandra	A	2–2	6,597	Blake, McCall
10 November 2001	Norwich City	A	4–1	17,414	Jess, Blake (2, 1 pen), Bower
17 November 2001	Walsall	H	2–0	14,251	Jess, Juanjo
20 November 2001	Preston North End	A	1–1	13,763	Blake
24 November 2001	West Bromwich Albion	A	0–1	18,910	
1 December 2001	Millwall	H	1–2	14,148	Blake
8 December 2001	Rotherham United	H	3–1	14,529	Blake (2, 1 pen), Ward
16 December 2001	Manchester City	A	1–3	30,749	Dunne (own goal)
23 December 2001	Coventry City	A	0–4	14,977	
26 December 2001	Sheffield United	H	1–2	18,869	Ward
29 December 2001	Crystal Palace	H	1–2	14,233	Blake
12 January 2002	Portsmouth	H	3–1	14,306	Grant, Sharpe (pen), Halle
19 January 2002	Barnsley	A	3–3	13,856	Sharpe, Ward (2)
29 January 2002	Preston North End	H	0–1	15,217	
2 February 2002	Grimsby Town	A	1–0	5,054	Carbone
16 February 2002	Wolverhampton Wanderers	A	1–3	21,935	Ward
23 February 2002	Gillingham	A	4–0	7,789	Patterson (own goal), Ward, Lawrence, Cadamarteri
26 February 2002	Nottingham Forest	H	2–1	13,505	Jess, Lawrence
2 March 2002	Sheffield Wednesday	H	0–2	16,904	
5 March 2002	Stockport County	A	0–1	4,148	
8 March 2002	Manchester City	H	0–2	18,168	
12 March 2002	Birmingham City	H	1–3	13,105	Jess
16 March 2002	Rotherham United	A	1–1	7,182	Jacobs
20 March 2002	Burnley	A	1–1	19,479	Jørgensen
23 March 2002	Crewe Alexandra	H	2–0	12,846	Wetherall, McCall
29 March 2002	Watford	A	0–0	14,001	
1 April 2002	Norwich City	H	0–1	14,143	
6 April 2002	Wimbledon	A	2–1	5,595	Jess, Bower
13 April 2002	West Bromwich Albion	H	0–1	20,209	
21 April 2002	Walsall	A	2–2	8,079	Cadamarteri, Uhlenbeek (own goal)

=== FA Cup ===
Round	Date	Opponent	Venue	Result	Attendance	Goalscorers
R3	8 January 2002	Walsall	A	0–2	4,509	

=== League Cup ===
Round	Date	Opponent	Venue	Result	Attendance	Goalscorers
R1	21 August 2001	Macclesfield Town	A	2–1 (a.e.t.)	2,526	Tod, McCall
R2	11 September 2001	Rotherham United	A	4–0	3,539	Blake (2, 1 pen), Tod, Lawrence
R3	9 October 2001	Watford	A	1–4	8,613	Ward (pen)

== First-team squad ==
Squad at end of season

Note: Flags indicate national team as defined under FIFA eligibility rules; some limited exceptions apply. Players may hold more than one non-FIFA nationality.

No.	Pos.	Nation	Player
1	GK	ENG	Gary Walsh
2	DF	ENG	Peter Atherton
3	DF	ENG	Andy Myers
4	MF	SCO	Stuart McCall (captain) (Note: McCall was born in Leeds, England, but also qualified to represent Scotland internationally through his father and made his international debut for Scotland in March 1988.)
5	DF	ENG	David Wetherall
6	MF	IRL	Gareth Whalley (Note: Whalley was born in Manchester, England, but also qualified to represent the Republic of Ireland internationally and has represented them at B level.)
7	MF	JAM	Jamie Lawrence (Note: Lawrence was born in Wandsworth, England, but also qualified to represent Jamaica internationally and made his international debut for Jamaica in February 2001.)
9	FW	ENG	Ashley Ward
10	FW	ITA	Benito Carbone
11	MF	SCO	Eoin Jess
12	DF	NED	Robert Molenaar
14	MF	SCO	Gary Locke
15	MF	ESP	Juanjo
16	MF	ENG	Lee Sharpe

No.	Pos.	Nation	Player
17	GK	NIR	Aidan Davison (Note: Davison was born in Sedgefield, England, but also qualified to represent Northern Ireland internationally and made his international debut for Northern Ireland in April 1996.)
18	DF	NOR	Gunnar Halle
19	MF	DEN	Claus Bech Jørgensen
20	DF	SCO	Andy Tod
22	DF	ENG	Wayne Jacobs
23	DF	ENG	Mark Bower
24	FW	ENG	Gareth Grant
27	GK	ENG	Mark Prudhoe
29	GK	SCO	Alan Combe (on loan from Dundee United)
30	DF	ENG	Simon Grayson (on loan from Blackburn Rovers)
31	FW	ENG	Danny Cadamarteri
32	MF	ENG	Andy Lee
33	DF	ENG	Lewis Emanuel
39	MF	ENG	Tom Kearney

=== Left club during season ===
Note: Flags indicate national team as defined under FIFA eligibility rules; some limited exceptions apply. Players may hold more than one non-FIFA nationality.

No.	Pos.	Nation	Player
8	FW	ENG	Robbie Blake (to Burnley)
13	GK	ENG	Matt Clarke (to Crystal Palace)
21	MF	ENG	Lee Makel (to Livingston)
25	MF	ENG	Matthew Etherington (on loan from Tottenham Hotspur)

No.	Pos.	Nation	Player
26	DF	SCO	Steven Caldwell (on loan from Newcastle United)
28	GK	ENG	Carl Muggleton (on loan from Cheltenham Town)
31	FW	ENG	Kingsley Jones (released)
34	MF	RSA	Adam Hardy (released)

=== Reserve squad ===
Note: Flags indicate national team as defined under FIFA eligibility rules; some limited exceptions apply. Players may hold more than one non-FIFA nationality.

No.	Pos.	Nation	Player
34	MF	ENG	Michael Standing
35	GK	ENG	Jon Worsnopp
36	MF	ENG	Craig Fishlock

No.	Pos.	Nation	Player
37	DF	ENG	Robert Morgan
38	FW	ENG	Danny Forrest
