= 2000–01 Bradford City A.F.C. season =

Bradford City A.F.C.
2000–01 season
- Chairman: Geoffrey Richmond
- Manager: Chris Hutchings (until 8 November); Stuart McCall (caretaker 8–20 November); Jim Jefferies (from 20 November)
- Stadium: Valley Parade
- FA Premier League: 20th (relegated)
- FA Cup: Third round
- League Cup: Third round
- UEFA Intertoto Cup: Semi-final
- Top goalscorer: League: Benito Carbone (5); All: Dean Windass (8)
- Highest home attendance: 22,057 vs Liverpool (1 May 2001, Premier League)
- Lowest home attendance: 4,751 vs Darlington (25 Sep 2000, League Cup)
- Average home league attendance: 18,511
Home colours	Away colours

During the 2000–01 English football season, Bradford City competed in the Premier League. It was their second consecutive season in England's top flight, having retained their FA Premier League status on the last day of the previous season.

== Season summary ==
The Bantams produced a promising start to the new season with a narrow 1–0 defeat at Anfield to Liverpool followed by a brilliant 2–0 home win over Chelsea in the first two games. However, that was as good as it got for the club and an overall-terrible start to the season saw inexperienced young manager Chris Hutchings dismissed after 12 games at the helm. In came Jim Jefferies as his successor, but Jefferies could do little to alter Bradford's dismal fortunes and they went down in bottom place with just five FA Premier League wins all season.

Bradford City made their first ever foray into European competition, competing in the UEFA Intertoto Cup. They reached the semi-finals before being knocked out by Russian club Zenit Saint Petersburg.

== Kit ==
Bradford City retained the previous season's kit, manufactured by Japanese company ASICS and sponsored by Bradford-based car dealership JCT600.

== Final league table ==
Pos	Team	Pld	W	D	L	GF	GA	GD	Pts	Qualification or relegation
16	Everton	38	11	9	18	45	59	−14	42	
17	Derby County	38	10	12	16	37	59	−22	42	
18	Manchester City (R)	38	8	10	20	41	65	−24	34	Relegation to the Football League First Division
19	Coventry City (R)	38	8	10	20	36	63	−27	34	Relegation to the Football League First Division
20	Bradford City (R)	38	5	11	22	30	70	−40	26	Relegation to the Football League First Division

Source: Premier League
Rules for classification: 1) points; 2) goal difference; 3) number of goals scored.
(R) Relegated

Results summary

Overall								Home						Away					
Pld	W	D	L	GF	GA	GD	Pts	W	D	L	GF	GA	GD	W	D	L	GF	GA	GD
38	5	11	22	30	70	−40	26	4	7	8	20	29	−9	1	4	14	10	41	−31

Source: 2000–01 FA Premier League table

Results by round

Round	1	2	3	4	5	6	7	8	9	10	11	12	13	14	15	16	17	18	19	20	21	22	23	24	25	26	27	28	29	30	31	32	33	34	35	36	37	38
Ground	A	H	H	A	H	A	H	A	A	H	H	A	H	A	A	H	H	A	A	H	A	H	A	A	H	A	H	A	H	H	A	H	H	A	H	H	A	A
Result	L	W	D	L	D	L	L	D	L	L	D	L	L	L	D	W	D	L	L	L	W	L	D	L	L	L	L	L	D	D	L	W	W	L	L	D	L	D
Position	15	7	9	15	14	18	20	19	19	19	19	19	20	20	20	20	18	20	20	20	20	20	20	20	20	20	20	20	20	20	20	20	20	20	20	20	20	20

Source: 11v11.com: 2000–01 Bradford City results
A = Away; H = Home; W = Win; D = Draw; L = Loss

== Results ==
Bradford City's score comes first

=== Legend ===
Win	Draw	Loss

=== FA Premier League ===
Date	Opponent	Venue	Result	Attendance	Scorers
19 August 2000	Liverpool	A	0–1	44,183	
22 August 2000	Chelsea	H	2–0	17,872	Windass, Carbone
26 August 2000	Leicester City	H	0–0	16,766	
5 September 2000	Manchester United	A	0–6	66,447	
9 September 2000	Arsenal	H	1–1	17,160	McCall
16 September 2000	Aston Villa	A	0–2	27,849	
23 September 2000	Southampton	H	0–1	16,163	
30 September 2000	West Ham United	A	1–1	25,407	Petrescu
14 October 2000	Manchester City	A	0–2	34,229	
21 October 2000	Ipswich Town	H	0–2	17,045	
29 October 2000	Leeds United	H	1–1	17,364	Collymore
4 November 2000	Charlton Athletic	A	0–2	19,655	
11 November 2000	Everton	H	0–1	17,276	
18 November 2000	Derby County	A	0–2	31,614	
25 November 2000	Middlesbrough	A	2–2	28,526	Windass, Carbone
2 December 2000	Coventry City	H	2–1	15,523	Collymore, Beagrie
9 December 2000	Tottenham Hotspur	H	3–3	17,225	Lawrence, Windass, Carbone
16 December 2000	Newcastle United	A	1–2	50,470	Molenaar
23 December 2000	Chelsea	A	0–3	33,377	
26 December 2000	Sunderland	H	1–4	20,370	Blake
1 January 2001	Leicester City	A	2–1	19,278	Jess, Jacobs
13 January 2001	Manchester United	H	0–3	20,551	
21 January 2001	Sunderland	A	0–0	47,812	
30 January 2001	Arsenal	A	0–2	37,318	
3 February 2001	Aston Villa	H	0–3	19,591	
10 February 2001	Southampton	A	0–2	14,651	
24 February 2001	West Ham United	H	1–2	20,469	Jess
4 March 2001	Ipswich Town	A	1–3	21,820	Carbone
17 March 2001	Manchester City	H	2–2	19,117	Blake, Ward
31 March 2001	Newcastle United	H	2–2	20,160	Wetherall, Blake (pen)
10 April 2001	Tottenham Hotspur	A	1–2	28,306	Jess
13 April 2001	Charlton Athletic	H	2–0	17,511	Blake (pen), Carbone
21 April 2001	Derby County	H	2–0	18,564	Ward (2)
28 April 2001	Everton	A	1–2	34,256	Myers
1 May 2001	Liverpool	H	0–2	22,057	
5 May 2001	Middlesbrough	H	1–1	20,921	Jacobs
13 May 2001	Leeds United	A	1–6	38,300	Ward
19 May 2001	Coventry City	A	0–0	20,299	

=== FA Cup ===
Round	Date	Opponent	Venue	Result	Attendance	Goalscorers
R3	8 January 2001	Middlesbrough	H	0–1	7,303	

=== League Cup ===
Round	Date	Opponent	Venue	Result	Attendance	Goalscorers
R2 1st Leg	19 September 2000	Darlington	A	1–0	5,392	Whalley
R2 2nd Leg	25 September 2000	Darlington	H	7–2 (won 8–2 on agg)	4,751	Whalley, Windass (2), Carbone (2), Grant, Halle
R3	1 November 2000	Newcastle United	A	3–4	41,847	Nolan, Ward (2)

=== UEFA Intertoto Cup ===
Round	Date	Opponent	Venue	Result	Attendance	Goalscorers
R2 1st Leg	1 July 2000	FK Atlantas	A	3–1	3,500	Rankin, Windass, Blake (pen)
R2 2nd Leg	9 July 2000	FK Atlantas	H	4–1 (won 7–2 on agg)	10,012	Mills (2), Blake (pen), Grant
R3 1st Leg	16 July 2000	RKC Waalwijk	H	2–0	8,343	Windass (2, 1 pen)
R3 2nd Leg	22 July 2000	RKC Waalwijk	A	1–0 (won 3–0 on agg)	3,700	Mills
SF 1st Leg	26 July 2000	FC Zenit Saint Petersburg	A	0–1	18,500	
SF 2nd Leg	2 August 2000	FC Zenit Saint Petersburg	H	0–3	9,572	

== First-team squad ==
Squad at end of season

Note: Flags indicate national team as defined under FIFA eligibility rules; some limited exceptions apply. Players may hold more than one non-FIFA nationality.

No.	Pos.	Nation	Player
1	GK	ENG	Gary Walsh
2	DF	NIR	Ian Nolan (Note: Nolan was born in Liverpool, England, but also qualified to represent Northern Ireland internationally and made his international debut for Northern Ireland in 1996.)
3	DF	ENG	Andy Myers
4	MF	SCO	Stuart McCall (captain)
5	DF	ENG	David Wetherall
6	MF	IRL	Gareth Whalley (Note: Whalley was born in Manchester, England, but also qualified to represent the Republic of Ireland internationally and has represented them at B level.)
7	MF	JAM	Jamie Lawrence (Note: Lawrence was born in Wandsworth, England, but also qualified to represent Jamaica internationally and would make his international debut for Jamaica in February 2001.)
8	FW	ENG	Robbie Blake
9	FW	ENG	Ashley Ward
10	FW	ITA	Benito Carbone
11	MF	ENG	Peter Beagrie
12	DF	NED	Robert Molenaar
13	GK	ENG	Matt Clarke
16	MF	ENG	Lee Sharpe
17	GK	NIR	Aidan Davison (Note: Davison was born in Sedgefield, England, but also qualified to represent Northern Ireland internationally and made his international debut for Northern Ireland in April 1996.)
18	DF	NOR	Gunnar Halle

No.	Pos.	Nation	Player
19	DF	SCO	Gary Locke
20	DF	ENG	Peter Atherton
21	FW	WAL	Dean Saunders
22	DF	ENG	Wayne Jacobs
23	DF	ENG	Mark Bower
24	FW	ENG	Gareth Grant
25	MF	ENG	Scott Kerr
27	MF	SCO	Billy McKinlay
29	MF	SCO	Eoin Jess (on loan from Aberdeen)
31	MF	RSA	Adam Hardy
32	GK	ENG	Jon Worsnop
33	FW	ENG	Ben Jones
34	DF	ENG	Lewis Emanuel
35	MF	ENG	Andy Lee
36	MF	ENG	Craig Fishlock

=== Left club during season ===
Note: Flags indicate national team as defined under FIFA eligibility rules; some limited exceptions apply. Players may hold more than one non-FIFA nationality.

No.	Pos.	Nation	Player
2	DF	ENG	Lee Todd (to Rochdale)
5	MF	ENG	Ashley Westwood (to Sheffield Wednesday)
9	FW	ENG	Lee Mills (to Portsmouth)
14	DF	IRL	Andy O'Brien (Note: O'Brien was born in Harrogate, England, but also qualified to represent the Republic of Ireland internationally and would make his international debut for the Republic of Ireland in 2001.) (to Newcastle United)
15	MF	ENG	Dean Windass (to Middlesbrough)
19	FW	ENG	Isaiah Rankin (to Barnsley)

No.	Pos.	Nation	Player
26	MF	ROU	Dan Petrescu (to Southampton)
28	FW	ENG	Stan Collymore (to Real Oviedo)
30	MF	SCO	David Hopkin (to Crystal Palace)

== Statistics ==
=== Appearances and goals ===
No.	Pos	Nat	Player	Total		Premier League		FA Cup		League Cup		Intertoto Cup	
No.	Pos	Nat	Player	Apps	Goals	Apps	Goals	Apps	Goals	Apps	Goals	Apps	Goals
Goalkeepers
1	GK	(England) ENG	Gary Walsh	21	0	19	0	1	0	0	0	1	0
13	GK	(England) ENG	Matt Clarke	21	0	17	0	0	0	1	0	3	0
17	GK	(Northern Ireland) NIR	Aidan Davison	7	0	2	0	0	0	2	0	2+1	0
Defenders
2	DF	(Northern Ireland) NIR	Ian Nolan	27	1	17+4	0	0	0	2	1	4	0
3	DF	(England) ENG	Andy Myers	24	1	15+5	1	0	0	0	0	3+1	0
5	DF	(England) ENG	David Wetherall	23	1	18	1	0	0	2	0	3	0
12	DF	(Netherlands) NED	Robert Molenaar	22	1	21	1	1	0	0	0	0	0
18	DF	(Norway) NOR	Gunnar Halle	17	1	10+3	0	0	0	2	1	2	0
20	DF	(England) ENG	Peter Atherton	33	0	25	0	1	0	3	0	4	0
22	DF	(England) ENG	Wayne Jacobs	26	2	19+2	2	1	0	1+1	0	2	0
23	DF	(England) ENG	Mark Bower	2	0	0	0	0	0	1	0	1	0
Midfielders
4	MF	(Scotland) SCO	Stuart McCall	43	1	36+1	1	1	0	0+1	0	4	0
6	MF	(Republic of Ireland) IRL	Gareth Whalley	28	2	17+2	0	0	0	3	2	5+1	0
7	MF	(Jamaica) JAM	Jamie Lawrence	21	1	15+2	1	0	0	2	0	0+2	0
11	MF	(England) ENG	Peter Beagrie	21	1	9+10	1	0+1	0	0	0	0+1	0
16	MF	(England) ENG	Lee Sharpe	16	0	6+5	0	0	0	2	0	3	0
19	MF	(Scotland) SCO	Gary Locke	7	0	6+1	0	0	0	0	0	0	0
25	MF	(England) ENG	Scott Kerr	3	0	0+1	0	0	0	0+1	0	1	0
27	MF	(Scotland) SCO	Billy McKinlay	12	0	10+1	0	1	0	0	0	0	0
29	MF	(Scotland) SCO	Eoin Jess	17	4	17	3	0	1	0	0	0	0
31	MF	(South Africa) RSA	Adam Hardy	1	0	0	0	0	0	0+1	0	0	0
Forwards
8	FW	(England) ENG	Robbie Blake	26	6	14+7	4	1	0	0	0	3+1	2
9	FW	(England) ENG	Ashley Ward	36	6	24+9	4	0	0	2+1	2	0	0
10	FW	(Italy) ITA	Benito Carbone	34	7	29+2	5	0+1	0	2	2	0	0
21	FW	(Wales) WAL	Dean Saunders	15	0	4+6	0	1	0	0+1	0	3	0
24	FW	(England) ENG	Gareth Grant	10	2	0+5	0	0	0	1+2	1	0+2	1
Players transferred out during the season
2	DF	(England) ENG	Lee Todd	2	0	0	0	0	0	0	0	2	0
5	MF	(England) ENG	Ashley Westwood	2	0	0	0	0	0	0	0	1+1	0
9	FW	(England) ENG	Lee Mills	5	3	0	0	0	0	0	0	5	3
14	DF	(Republic of Ireland) IRL	Andy O'Brien	23	0	17+1	0	1	0	0	0	4	0
15	FW	(England) ENG	Dean Windass	34	8	22+2	3	1	0	3	2	6	3
19	FW	(England) ENG	Isaiah Rankin	3	1	0+1	0	0	0	0	0	1+1	1
26	DF	(Romania) ROU	Dan Petrescu	20	1	16+1	1	0+1	0	2	0	0	0
28	FW	(England) ENG	Stan Collymore	8	2	5+2	2	0	0	1	0	0	0
30	MF	(Scotland) SCO	David Hopkin	16	0	8+3	0	0	0	1	0	3+1	0

=== Starting 11 ===
Considering starts in all competitions
Considering a 4–3–3 formation

No.	Pos.	Nat.	Name	MS	Notes
13	GK	(England)	Matt Clarke	21	Gary Walsh has 21 starts
20	RB	(England)	Peter Atherton	33	Dan Petrescu has 18 starts
5	CB	(England)	David Wetherall	23	Robert Molenaar has 22 starts
14	CB	(Republic of Ireland)	Andy O'Brien	22	Andy Myers has 18 starts
2	LB	(England)	Ian Nolan	23	Wayne Jacobs has 23 starts
29	CM	(Scotland)	Eoin Jess	18	
4	CM	(Scotland)	Stuart McCall	41	
6	CM	(Republic of Ireland)	Gareth Whalley	25	
9	RW	(England)	Ashley Ward	26	Robbie Blake has 18 starts
10	CF	(Italy)	Benito Carbone	31	
15	LW	(England)	Dean Windass	32	

== Transfers ==
=== In ===
Date	Position	Name	From	Fee
4 July 2000	DF	Ian Nolan	Sheffield Wednesday	Free transfer
4 July 2000	DF	Peter Atherton	Sheffield Wednesday	Free transfer
7 July 2000	MF	David Hopkin	Leeds United	£2,500,000
30 July 2000	MF	Dan Petrescu	Chelsea	£1,000,000
9 August 2000	FW	Benito Carbone	Aston Villa	Free transfer
18 August 2000	FW	Ashley Ward	Blackburn Rovers	£1,500,000
26 October 2000	FW	Stan Collymore	Leicester City	Free transfer
24 November 2000	MF	Billy McKinlay	Blackburn Rovers	Free transfer
1 December 2000	DF	Robert Molenaar	Leeds United	£500,000
25 January 2001	DF	Gary Locke	Hearts	Free transfer

=== Out ===
Date	Position	Name	To	Fee
14 July 2000	DF	John Dreyer	Cambridge United	Free transfer
2 August 2000	DF	Lee Todd	Rochdale	Free transfer
11 August 2000	FW	Lee Mills	Portsmouth	£1,000,000
21 August 2000	DF	Stephen Wright	Dundee United	Nominal
11 September 2000	DF	Ashley Westwood	Sheffield Wednesday	£150,000
12 January 2001	MF	Dan Petrescu	Southampton	Nominal
19 January 2001	FW	Isaiah Rankin	Barnsley	£350,000
30 January 2001	FW	Stan Collymore	Real Oviedo	Free transfer
8 March 2001	FW	Dean Windass	Middlesbrough	£600,000
15 March 2001	MF	David Hopkin	Crystal Palace	£1,500,000
19 March 2001	DF	Andy O'Brien	Newcastle United	£2,000,000

Transfers in: ▼£5,500,000
Transfers out: ▲£5,600,000
Total spending: ▲£100,000
