= 1998–99 Leeds United A.F.C. season =

1998–99 season of Leeds United

Leeds United
1998–99 season
- Chairman: Peter Ridsdale
- Manager: George Graham (until 1 October); David O'Leary (from 1 October)
- Stadium: Elland Road
- Premier League: 4th
- FA Cup: Fifth round
- League Cup: Fourth round
- UEFA Cup: Second round
- Top goalscorer: League: Jimmy Floyd Hasselbaink (18); All: Jimmy Floyd Hasselbaink (20)
- Highest home attendance: 40,255 vs Manchester United (25 April 1999, Premier League)
- Lowest home attendance: 27,561 vs Bradford City (28 October 1998, League Cup)
- Average home league attendance: 36,028

The 1998–99 season saw Leeds United competing in the Premier League (known as the FA Carling Premiership for sponsorship reasons) and the UEFA Cup.

== Competitions ==
=== Premier League ===
==== League table ====
Pos	Team	Pld	W	D	L	GF	GA	GD	Pts	Qualification or relegation
2	Arsenal	38	22	12	4	59	17	+42	78	Qualification for the Champions League first group stage
3	Chelsea	38	20	15	3	57	30	+27	75	Qualification for the Champions League third qualifying round
4	Leeds United	38	18	13	7	62	34	+28	67	Qualification for the UEFA Cup first round
5	West Ham United	38	16	9	13	46	53	−7	57	Qualification for the Intertoto Cup third round
6	Aston Villa	38	15	10	13	51	46	+5	55	

Source: Premier League
Rules for classification: 1) points; 2) goal difference; 3) number of goals scored.

==== Results summary ====
Overall								Home						Away					
Pld	W	D	L	GF	GA	GD	Pts	W	D	L	GF	GA	GD	W	D	L	GF	GA	GD
38	18	13	7	62	34	+28	67	12	5	2	32	9	+23	6	8	5	30	25	+5

Source: 1998–99 FA Premier League table

==== Results by round ====
Round	1	2	3	4	5	6	7	8	9	10	11	12	13	14	15	16	17	18	19	20	21	22	23	24	25	26	27	28	29	30	31	32	33	34	35	36	37	38
Ground	A	H	A	H	A	H	A	H	A	H	A	H	A	H	A	H	H	A	A	H	A	H	A	H	A	H	A	H	A	H	H	H	A	H	A	A	H	A
Result	D	W	D	W	D	D	D	L	D	D	D	W	W	W	L	W	W	L	W	D	L	W	L	L	W	W	W	W	W	W	W	D	D	D	W	L	W	D
Position	6	7	5	1	3	5	5	10	9	10	9	6	5	5	6	3	3	5	4	5	5	5	5	6	5	5	4	4	4	3	4	4	4	4	4	4	4	4

Source: Statto.com
A = Away; H = Home; W = Win; D = Draw; L = Loss

==== Matches ====
15 August 1998 1	Middlesbrough	0–0	Leeds United	Middlesbrough
				Stadium: Riverside Stadium; Attendance: 34,162; Referee: David Elleray

24 August 1998 2	Leeds United	1–0	Blackburn Rovers	Leeds
	Hasselbaink 18'			Stadium: Elland Road; Attendance: 30,541; Referee: Dermot Gallagher

29 August 1998 3	Wimbledon	1–1	Leeds United	Croydon
	Hughes 72'		Bowyer 61'	Stadium: Selhurst Park; Attendance: 16,473; Referee: Stephen Dunn

8 September 1998 4	Leeds United	3–0	Southampton	Leeds
	Marshall 38' (o.g.); Harte 52'; Wijnhard 86'			Stadium: Elland Road; Attendance: 30,637; Referee: Alan Wilkie

12 September 1998 5	Everton	0–0	Leeds United	Liverpool
				Stadium: Goodison Park; Attendance: 36,687; Referee: Neale Barry

19 September 1998 6	Leeds United	0–0	Aston Villa	Leeds
				Stadium: Elland Road; Attendance: 33,162; Referee: Jeff Winter

26 September 1998 7	Tottenham Hotspur	3–3	Leeds United	Haringey
	Vega 14'; Iversen 71'; Campbell 90'		Halle 4'; Hasselbaink 26'; Wijnhard 61'	Stadium: White Hart Lane; Attendance: 35,535; Referee: Paul Durkin

3 October 1998 8	Leeds United	0–1	Leicester City	Leeds
			Cottee 76'	Stadium: Elland Road; Attendance: 32,606; Referee: Graham Barber

17 October 1998 9	Nottingham Forest	1–1	Leeds United	Nottingham
	Stone 85'		Halle 53'	Stadium: City Ground; Attendance: 23,911; Referee: Alan Wilkie

25 October 1998 10	Leeds United	0–0	Chelsea	Leeds
		Report		Stadium: Elland Road; Attendance: 35,833; Referee: Mike Reed

31 October 1998 11	Derby County	2–2	Leeds United	Derby
	Schnoor 3' (pen.); Sturridge 56'		Molenaar 16'; Kewell 43'	Stadium: Pride Park; Attendance: 27,034; Referee: Neale Barry

8 November 1998 12	Leeds United	2–1	Sheffield Wednesday	Leeds
	Hasselbaink 40'; Woodgate 61'		Booth 3'	Stadium: Elland Road; Attendance: 30,012; Referee: Keith Burge

14 November 1998 13	Liverpool	1–3	Leeds United	Liverpool
	Fowler 68' (pen.)		Smith 79'; Hasselbaink 81', 86'	Stadium: Anfield; Attendance: 44,305; Referee: Dermot Gallagher

21 November 1998 14	Leeds United	4–1	Charlton Athletic	Leeds
	Hasselbaink 34'; Bowyer 51'; Smith 67'; Kewell 87'		Mortimer 65'	Stadium: Elland Road; Attendance: 32,487; Referee: Rob Harris

29 November 1998 15	Manchester United	3–2	Leeds United	Manchester
	Solskjaer 45'; Keane 46'; Butt 77'		Hasselbaink 29'; Kewell 52'	Stadium: Old Trafford; Attendance: 55,172; Referee: Graham Poll

5 December 1998 16	Leeds United	4–0	West Ham United	Leeds
	Bowyer 8', 61'; Molenaar 68'; Hasselbaink 79'			Stadium: Elland Road; Attendance: 36,320; Referee: Jeff Winter

14 December 1998 17	Leeds United	2–0	Coventry City	Leeds
	Hopkin 40'; Bowyer 90'			Stadium: Elland Road; Attendance: 31,799; Referee: Graham Poll

20 December 1998 18	Arsenal	3–1	Leeds United	Islington
	Bergkamp 28'; Viera 53'; Petit 82'		Hasselbaink 66'	Stadium: Highbury; Attendance: 38,025; Referee: Paul Durkin

26 December 1998 19	Newcastle United	0–3	Leeds United	Newcastle
			Kewell 38'; Bowyer 62'; Hasselbaink 90'	Stadium: St James' Park; Attendance: 36,783; Referee: Gary Willard

29 December 1998 20	Leeds United	2–2	Wimbledon	Leeds
	Ribeiro 26'; Hopkin 57'		Earle 41'; Cort 83'	Stadium: Elland Road; Attendance: 39,816; Referee: Peter Jones

9 January 1999 21	Blackburn Rovers	1–0	Leeds United	Blackburn
	Gillespie 22'			Stadium: Ewood Park; Attendance: 27,620; Referee: Rob Harris

16 January 1999 22	Leeds United	2–0	Middlesbrough	Leeds
	Smith 21'; Bowyer 27'	Report		Stadium: Elland Road; Attendance: 37,473; Referee: Stephen Lodge

30 January 1999 23	Southampton	3–0	Leeds United	Southampton
	Kachloul 31'; Oakley 62'; Ostenstad 86'			Stadium: The Dell; Attendance: 15,526; Referee: Stephen Dunn

6 February 1999 24	Leeds United	0–1	Newcastle United	Leeds
			Solano 63'	Stadium: Elland Road; Attendance: 40,202; Referee: Uriah Rennie

17 February 1999 25	Aston Villa	1–2	Leeds United	Birmingham
	Scimeca 76'		Hasselbaink 8', 32'	Stadium: Villa Park; Attendance: 37,510; Referee: Dermot Gallagher

20 February 1999 26	Leeds United	1–0	Everton	Leeds
	Korsten 55'			Stadium: Elland Road; Attendance: 36,344; Referee: David Elleray

1 March 1999 27	Leicester City	1–2	Leeds United	Leicester
	Cottee 76'		Kewell 24'; Smith 60'	Stadium: Filbert Street; Attendance: 18,101; Referee: Graham Barber

10 March 1999 28	Leeds United	2–0	Tottenham Hotspur	Leeds
	Smith 42'; Kewell 68'			Stadium: Elland Road; Attendance: 34,561; Referee: Neale Barry

13 March 1999 29	Sheffield Wednesday	0–2	Leeds United	Sheffield
			Hasselbaink 4'; Hopkin 73'	Stadium: Hillsborough; Attendance: 28,142; Referee: Graham Poll

20 March 1999 30	Leeds United	4–1	Derby County	Leeds
	Bowyer 18'; Hasselbaink 32'; Korsten 45'; Harte 85'	Report	Baiano 4' (pen.)	Stadium: Elland Road; Attendance: 38,992; Referee: Mike Reed

3 April 1999 31	Leeds United	3–1	Nottingham Forest	Leeds
	Hasselbaink 43'; Harte 60'; Smith 84'		Rogers 53'	Stadium: Elland Road; Attendance: 39,645; Referee: Paul Alcock

12 April 1999 32	Leeds United	0–0	Liverpool	Leeds
				Stadium: Elland Road; Attendance: 39,451; Referee: Peter Jones

17 April 1999 33	Charlton Athletic	1–1	Leeds United	Charlton
	Stuart 20'		Woodgate 24'	Stadium: The Valley; Attendance: 20,043; Referee: Alan Wilkie

25 April 1999 34	Leeds United	1–1	Manchester United	Leeds
	Hasselbaink 32'	Report	Cole 56'	Stadium: Elland Road; Attendance: 40,255; Referee: Dermot Gallagher

1 May 1999 35	West Ham United	1–5	Leeds United	Newham
	Di Canio 48'		Hasselbaink 1'; Smith 45'; Harte 62' (pen.); Bowyer 78'; Haaland 79'	Stadium: Boleyn Ground; Attendance: 25,997; Referee: Rob Harris

5 May 1999 36	Chelsea	1–0	Leeds United	Fulham
	Poyet 68'			Stadium: Stamford Bridge; Attendance: 34,762; Referee: Jeff Winter

11 May 1999 37	Leeds United	1–0	Arsenal	Leeds
	Hasselbaink 85'	Report		Stadium: Elland Road; Attendance: 40,124; Referee: Gary Willard

16 May 1999 38	Coventry City	2–2	Leeds United	Coventry
	Aloisi 63'; Telfer 72'		Wijnhard 43'; Hopkin 90'	Stadium: Highfield Road; Attendance: 23,049; Referee: Stephen Lodge

=== FA Cup ===
2 January 1999 3	Rushden & Diamonds	0–0	Leeds United	Irthlingborough
				Stadium: Nene Park; Attendance: 6,431; Referee: Steve Dunn

13 January 1999 Replay	Leeds United	3–1	Rushden & Diamonds	Leeds
	Smith 22', 51'; Hasselbaink 67'		Heggs 11'	Stadium: Elland Road; Attendance: 39,159; Referee: Steve Dunn

23 January 1999 4	Portsmouth	1–5	Leeds United	Portsmouth
	Nightingale 10'		Wetherall 11'; Harte 17'; Kewell 50'; Ribeiro 73'; Wijnhard 82'	Stadium: Fratton Park; Attendance: 18,864; Referee: Gary Willard

13 February 1999 5	Leeds United	1–1	Tottenham Hotspur	Leeds
	Harte 73'		Sherwood 53'	Stadium: Elland Road; Attendance: 39,696; Referee: Neale Barry

24 February 1999 Replay	Tottenham Hotspur	2–0	Leeds United	Haringey
	Anderton 60'; Ginola 68'			Stadium: White Hart Lane; Attendance: 32,307; Referee: Neale Barry

=== League Cup ===
28 October 1998 3	Leeds United	1–0	Bradford City	Leeds
	Kewell 28'			Stadium: Elland Road; Attendance: 27,561; Referee: Uriah Rennie

11 November 1998 4	Leicester City	2–1	Leeds United	Leicester
	Izzet 88'; Parker 90' (pen.)		Kewell 17'	Stadium: Filbert Street; Attendance: 20,161; Referee: Paul Durkin

=== UEFA Cup ===
==== First round ====
15 September 1998	Leeds United	1–0	Marítimo	Leeds
	Hasselbaink 84'			Stadium: Elland Road; Attendance: 38,033; Referee: Alain Sars (France)

29 September 1998	Marítimo	1–0 (a.e.t.) (1–4 p)	Leeds United	Funchal
	Soares 45'			Stadium: Estádio do Marítimo; Attendance: 10,000; Referee: Fritz Stuchlik (Austria)

==== Second round ====
20 October 1998	Roma	1–0	Leeds United	Rome
	Delvecchio 18'			Stadium: Stadio Olimpico; Attendance: 41,892; Referee: Antonio Jesús López Nieto (Spain)

3 November 1998	Leeds United	0–0	Roma	Leeds
		Report		Stadium: Elland Road; Attendance: 39,161; Referee: Bernd Heynemann (Germany)

== Statistics ==
No.	Pos.	Name	League		FA Cup		League Cup		UEFA Cup		Total		Discipline	
No.	Pos.	Name	Apps	Goals	Apps	Goals	Apps	Goals	Apps	Goals	Apps	Goals	Yellow card	Red card
1	GK	(England) Nigel Martyn	34	0	5	0	1	0	4	0	44	0	0	0
4	MF	(Norway) Alf-Inge Haaland	24+5	1	3+1	0	0	0	2+1	0	36	1	10	0
5	DF	(South Africa) Lucas Radebe	29	0	3	0	1	0	3	0	36	0	4	0
6	DF	(England) David Wetherall	14+7	0	4	1	0	0	0	0	25	1	3	0
7	MF	(Netherlands) Willem Korsten	4+3	2	2+1	0	0	0	0	0	10	2	0	0
8	FW	(Netherlands) Clyde Wijnhard	11+7	3	1+1	1	1	0	1+3	0	25	4	5	0
9	FW	(Netherlands) Jimmy Floyd Hasselbaink	36	18	5	1	2	0	4	1	47	20	9	0
10	MF	(Portugal) Bruno Ribeiro	7+6	1	1	1	1	0	1+1	0	17	2	2	0
11	MF	(England) Lee Bowyer	35	9	4	0	2	0	4	0	45	9	11	0
12	MF	(Scotland) David Hopkin	32+2	4	5	0	2	0	4	0	45	4	7	0
16	DF	(England) Danny Granville	2+2	0	0	0	0	0	1+2	0	7	0	1	1
17	FW	(Scotland) Derek Lilley	0+2	0	0	0	0	0	0+1	0	3	0	0	0
18	DF	(Norway) Gunnar Halle	14+3	2	2+1	0	1	0	2	0	23	2	0	0
19	FW	(Australia) Harry Kewell	36+2	6	5	1	2	2	4	0	49	9	3	0
20	DF	(Republic of Ireland) Ian Harte	34+1	4	5	2	1	0	3	0	44	6	7	0
21	DF	(Austria) Martin Hiden	14	0	0	0	1	0	4	0	19	0	0	0
22	MF	(Norway) Tommy Knarvik	0	0	0+1	0	0	0	0	0	1	0	0	0
23	MF	(England) David Batty	10	0	0	0	0	0	0	0	10	0	6	0
25	DF	(England) Jonathan Woodgate	10	2	0	0	0	0	0	0	10	2	6	0
30	DF	(Netherlands) Robert Molenaar	17	2	0	0	2	0	4	0	23	2	5	0
36	GK	(England) Paul Robinson	4+1	0	0	0	1	0	0	0	6	0	0	0
37	MF	(Republic of Ireland) Stephen McPhail	11+6	0	0	0	1	0	2	0	20	0	0	0
39	FW	(England) Alan Smith	15+7	7	2+2	2	0	0	0	0	26	9	7	0
40	MF	(Wales) Matt Jones	3+5	0	0+1	0	0	0	0	0	3+6	0	0	0

== Transfers ==
=== In ===
Date	Pos.	Name	From	Fee
19 June 1998	DF	(England) Danny Granville	(England) Chelsea	£1,600,000
13 October 1998	GK	(Portugal) Nuno Santos	(Portugal) Vitória	Free
8 December 1998	MF	(England) David Batty	(England) Newcastle United	£4,400,000

=== Out ===
Date	Pos.	Name	To	Fee
19 June 1998	MF	(England) Jason Blunt	(England) Blackpool	Free
29 August 1998	FW	(Scotland) Andy Gray	(England) Nottingham Forest	£200,000

=== Loan in ===
Date from	Date to	Pos.	Name	From
11 January 1999	30 June 1999	FW	(Netherlands) Willem Korsten	(Netherlands) Vitesse

=== Loan out ===
Date from	Date to	Pos.	Name	From
24 September 1998	1 October 1998	FW	(England) Lee Matthews	(England) Notts County
29 October 1998	28 November 1998	DF	(England) Mark Jackson	(England) Huddersfield Town
1 December 1998	1 February 1999	FW	(Scotland) Derek Lilley	(Scotland) Hearts
29 December 1998	23 March 1999	FW	(England) Lee Sharpe	(Italy) Sampdoria
1 March 1999	1 April 1999	FW	(Scotland) Derek Lilley	(England) Bury
25 March 1999	9 May 1999	DF	(Republic of Ireland) Alan Maybury	(England) Reading
