= Tribal Sports Management =

Sports for Tribal

Tribal Sports Management (TSM) is a Melbourne-based sports management company with offices in Australia, China and activity in North America and Europe. The company represents a number of sporting clubs and organizations. TSM offers services to the sports industry and corporate community, including the following:

- Talent Representation
- Sponsorship, Consulting, and Television Rights
- Sports Executive and Staff Recruitment
- International Club Matches, Tours, and Tournaments

The TSM managing director holds official FIFA player agent and matches agent licenses. TSM consults with a number of international corporations and football clubs on a range of services, from sponsorship and activation to brand management and strategies.

== Clients ==
Some past and present clients of TSM:

- Scott McDonald - Australian footballer and Australian national team member, played club football for Celtic F.C. in Scotland, was the top goal scorer in championship winning season of 2007-2008
- Ryan McGowan - Australian football and Australian national team member, plays club football for Shandong Luneng Taishan in the Chinese Super League
- Shinji Ono - TSM was responsible for the Japanese superstar signing for Western Sydney Wanderers FC in the A-League
- Alessandro Del Piero - TSM was responsible for the Italian superstar signing for Sydney FC in the A-League in August 2012, making him the highest-paid footballer to ever play in Australia
- Dwight Yorke - TSM was responsible for signing the former Manchester United champion to Sydney FC in the inaugural A-League season
- Benito Carbone - TSM was responsible for securing the Italian's guest appearance for Sydney FC in the A-League
- Kazu - TSM brought the Japanese legend to Sydney FC in the A-League
- Brendon Santalab - Former Sydney FC striker now with Lifan FC in China
- Rostyn Griffiths - Former Blackburn Rovers and Central Coast Mariners FC midfielder now with Guangzhou R & F, China
- Pierre Littbarski - German World Cup winner was brought to Australia by TSM to coach Sydney FC in 2005/06
- Terry Butcher - Former England captain brought to Australia by TSM to coach Sydney FC in 2006/07

== International tour matches ==
International tour matches with TSM involvement:

- David Beckham & the LA Galaxy

- 2007 v Sydney FC at ANZ Stadium in front of 80,000
- 2007 v Wellington Phoenix FC at Westpac Stadium Wellington 30,000 fans
- 2009 v Oceania All Stars that included Christian Karembeu and former Juventus star Edgar Davids
- 2010 v Newcastle Jets FC at Energy Australia Stadium in front of 23,000 fans
- 2011 v Melbourne Victory FC at Etihad Stadium in front of 31,000 that also included Republic of Ireland legend Robbie Keane

- Celtic F.C. - 2009 & 2011
- Liverpool F.C. - 2013
- Sydney FC - Pre-season tour in 2005 to Dubai that included games against Al Jazira and Al Ain

== Achievements ==
Lou Sticca, the Managing Director of TSM was announced as one of the 10 most influential people in Australian Football for 2013 in the Herald Sun.
