= Andy Myers =

English footballer

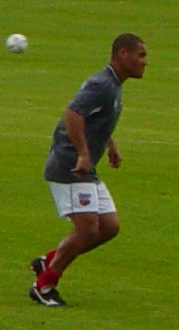
- Myers warming up with Brentford in 2004

Personal information
- Full name: Andrew John Myers
- Date of birth: 3 November 1973 (age 53)
- Place of birth: Hounslow, England
- Height: 5 ft 10 in (1.78 m)
- Position: Defender

Youth career
- –1991: Chelsea

Senior career*
Years	Team	Apps	(Gls)
1991–1999	Chelsea	85	(2)
1999–2003	Bradford City	89	(3)
2000	→ Portsmouth (loan)	8	(0)
2003–2004	Colchester United	21	(0)
2004–2005	Brentford	10	(0)
Total		213	(5)

International career
1989–1990	England U16	12	(1)
1990	England U17	1	(2)
1990–1992	England U18	11	(4)
1991–1993	England U19	6	(0)
1992–1993	England U20	5	(0)
1995	England U21	5	(1)

Managerial career
- 2018–2019: Chelsea U18
- 2019–2022: Chelsea Development Squad
- * Club domestic league appearances and goals

Andrew John Myers (born 3 November 1973) is an English football coach and former professional footballer who was most recently assistant head coach of EFL Championship club Millwall.

As a player, he was a defender, notably in the Premier League with Chelsea and Bradford City. He also played in the Football League for Colchester United, Brentford and Portsmouth. Myers was capped by England at youth level.

Since retirement, Myers has worked as a coach and returned to Chelsea in 2015 as a youth coach. He later had a spell as assistant manager of Eredivise club Vitesse before returning in 2017 to work in various roles at Chelsea.

== Club career ==
=== Chelsea ===
A product of the Chelsea Centre of Excellence, Myers made his bow in senior football with three first team appearances late in the 1990–91 First Division season and he was voted the club's Young Player of the Year. Myers signed his first professional contract in July 1991 and despite injury trouble and never featuring regularly, he would play for a further eight seasons as a professional for Chelsea and was a member of the 1996–97 FA Cup and 1997–98 UEFA Cup Winners' Cup-winning teams. After being made available for transfer, Myers departed Stamford Bridge in July 1999 and made 106 appearances and scored two goals for the club.

=== Bradford City ===
On 16 July 1999, Myers joined Premier League club Bradford City on a four-year contract for an £800,000 fee. He missed most of the 1999–00 pre-season with a thigh strain and finally made his debut as a 66th-minute substitute for Wayne Jacobs in a 1–1 draw with Tottenham Hotspur on 12 September 1999. He then became the starting left back, but lost his place in the team to Lee Sharpe in October, due to suspension and illness. Myers returned to the team in November 1999 and featured regularly until mid-January 2000, when he suffered a groin injury. After returning to fitness, he joined First Division strugglers Portsmouth on loan until the end of the season. He made eight appearances and helped Pompey finish clear of the relegation places.

Myers began the 2000–01 season as a regular, making four appearances in Bradford's Intertoto Cup campaign and three Premier League appearances, before missing 2 1/2 months of the season with successive injuries. He returned to the struggling team in late November 2000 and thereafter managed to remain fit. Myers scored his first goal for the club with a crucial early header versus Everton on 28 April 2001, but two missed penalties deflated the Bantams and the team succumbed to a 2–1 defeat, which sealed the club's relegation to the First Division. In the penultimate game of the season and with Bradford 5–1 down in the West Yorkshire derby to Leeds United, Myers exchanged blows with captain Stuart McCall on the stroke of half time. Both players remained on the pitch and were fined two weeks' wages. Myers finished the 2000–01 season with 24 appearances and one goal.

Myers had his best season with Bradford in 2001–02, making 32 appearances and scoring two goals before suffering a hamstring injury in March 2002. He returned for two further appearances in April and was named the Bantams' Player of the Year. The club entered administration in May 2002 and Myers was one of 19 players made redundant, but he would remain at Valley Parade for the 2002–03 season. He made 25 appearances during a season in which Bradford narrowly avoided relegation. He was released in May 2003. In three seasons with the Bantams, Myers made 99 appearances and scored three goals.

=== Colchester United ===
After attention from First Division club Rotherham United, Myers signed a one-year contract with Second Division Colchester United on a free transfer. He made 26 appearances before his season was ended by a back injury in December 2003. Despite being invited back for the 2004–05 pre-season, Myers elected to leave the club in June 2004.

=== Brentford ===
On 11 June 2004, Myers turned down an approach from Oxford United to sign a two-year contract with League One club Brentford on a free transfer. He made just 13 appearances during the 2004–05 season and was given a free transfer in May 2005. Myers retired at age 32, due to a recurring back injury that affected him throughout his career.

== International career ==
Myers won 40 caps and scored eight goals for England between U16 and U21 level. He was a member of the U20 squad which finished fourth at the 1993 FIFA World Youth Championship.

== Coaching career ==
Myers began his coaching career with Old Isleworthians Youth, overseeing the U8 to U14 range. In 2011, he returned to Chelsea as U15 head coach and became assistant to U21 and U19 head coach Dermot Drummy in 2012. He spent the 2016–17 season as an assistant first team coach at Vitesse, before returning to Chelsea to take up the role as Development Squad head coach Joe Edwards' assistant. On 6 July 2018, it was announced that Myers had been appointed Chelsea U18 manager and one year later, he was promoted into the role of Development Squad head coach. During the curtailed 2019–20 season, which ended with the final standings being determined by points per game, Myers managed the team to the Premier League 2 First Division title. He moved into the role of loan player technical coach in May 2022. He remained in the role until 6 November 2023, when he was appointed as assistant to head coach Joe Edwards at Millwall. Myers departed the club after Edwards' sacking on 21 February 2024. In November 2025, Myers temporarily assisted the coaching of Middlesbrough under caretaker manager Adi Viveash.

== Career statistics ==
Appearances and goals by club, season, and competition
Club	Season	League			FA Cup		League Cup		Europe		Other		Total	
Club	Season	Division	Apps	Goals	Apps	Goals	Apps	Goals	Apps	Goals	Apps	Goals	Apps	Goals
Chelsea	1990–91	First Division	3	0	0	0	0	0	—		—		3	0
Chelsea	1991–92	First Division	11	1	2	0	1	0	—		—		14	1
Chelsea	1992–93	Premier League	3	0	0	0	1	0	—		—		4	0
Chelsea	1993–94	Premier League	6	0	4	0	0	0	—		—		10	0
Chelsea	1994–95	Premier League	10	0	0	0	0	0	2 (Note: Appearances in UEFA Cup Winners' Cup)	0	0	0	12	0
Chelsea	1995–96	Premier League	20	0	3	0	0	0	—		—		23	0
Chelsea	1996–97	Premier League	18	1	0	0	0	0	—		—		18	1
Chelsea	1997–98	Premier League	12	0	1	0	1	0	3	0	0	0	17	0
Chelsea	1998–99	Premier League	1	0	2	0	0	0	1	0	—		4	0
Chelsea	Total		85	2	12	0	3	0	6	0	0	0	106	2
Bradford City	1999–00	Premier League	13	0	1	0	2	0	—		—		16	0
Bradford City	2000–01	Premier League	20	1	0	0	0	0	4 (Note: Appearances in UEFA Intertoto Cup)	0	—		24	1
Bradford City	2001–02	First Division	32	2	0	0	2	0	—		—		34	2
Bradford City	2002–03	First Division	24	0	0	0	1	0	—		—		25	0
Bradford City	Total		89	3	1	0	5	0	4	0	—		99	3
Portsmouth (loan)	1999–00	First Division	8	0	—		—		—		—		8	0
Colchester United	2003–04	Second Division	21	0	2	0	1	0	—		2 (Note: Appearances in Football League Trophy)	0	26	0
Brentford	2004–05	League One	10	0	1	0	1	0	—		1	0	13	0
Career total			213	5	16	0	10	0	10	0	3	0	252	5

== Honours ==
Chelsea

- FA Cup: 1996–97
- UEFA Cup Winners' Cup: 1997–98

Individual

- Chelsea Young Player of the Year: 1990–91
- Bradford City Player of the Year: 2001–02
