= Adam Hardy =

Adam Hardy may refer to:

- Adam Hardy (architectural historian) (born 1953), British architectural historian
- Adam Hardy (footballer), South African footballer

== See also ==
- Adam Hardy, pseudonym of British writer Kenneth Bulmer
