= Lee Bowyer =

English footballer and manager (born 1977)

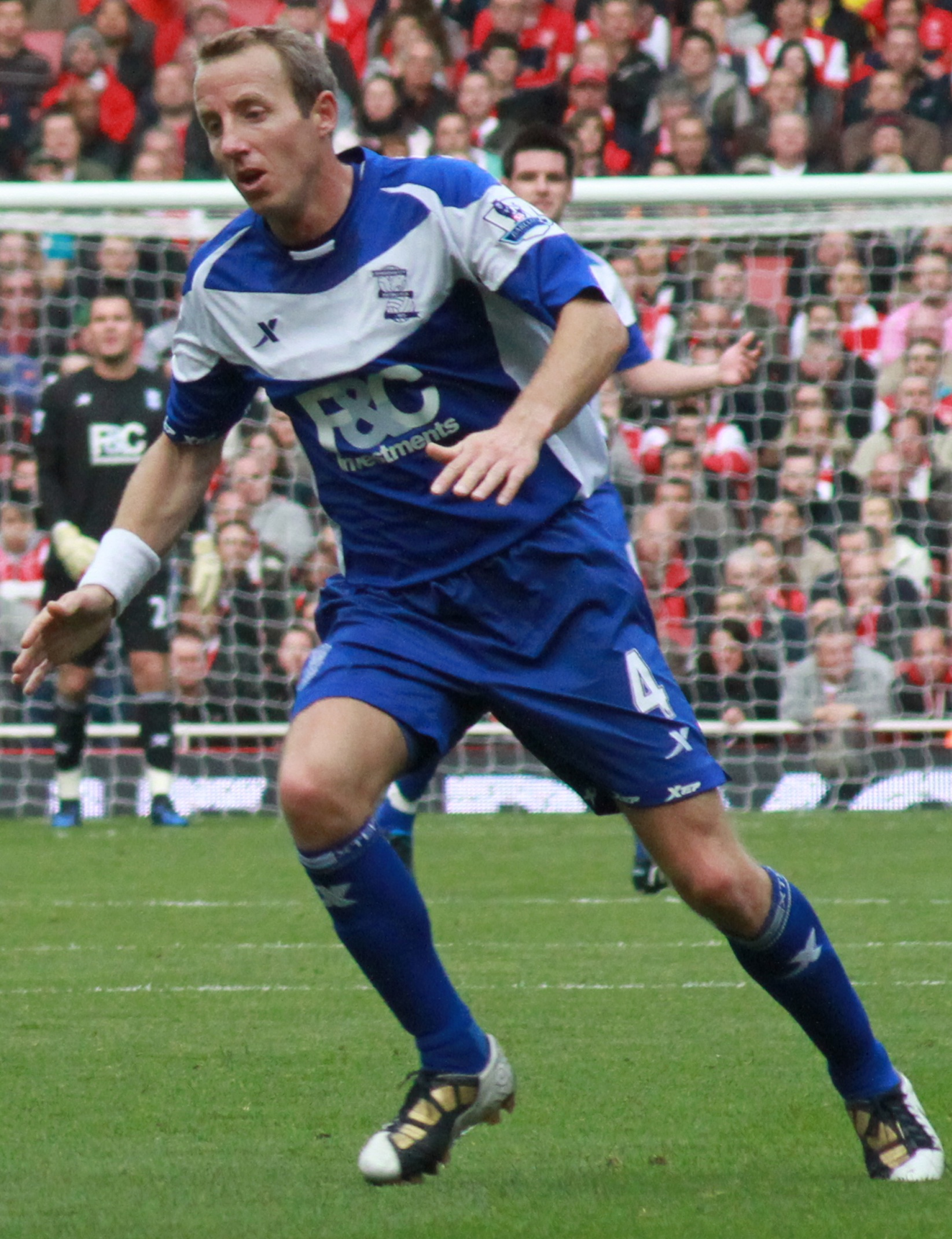
- Bowyer playing for Birmingham City in 2010

Personal information
- Full name: Lee David Bowyer
- Date of birth: 3 January 1977 (age 49)
- Place of birth: Canning Town, London, England
- Height: 5 ft 9 in (1.75 m)
- Position: Midfielder

Youth career
- Senrab
- Charlton Athletic

Senior career*
Years	Team	Apps	(Gls)
1994–1996	Charlton Athletic	46	(8)
1996–2003	Leeds United	203	(38)
2003	West Ham United	10	(0)
2003–2006	Newcastle United	79	(6)
2006–2009	West Ham United	41	(4)
2009	→ Birmingham City (loan)	17	(1)
2009–2011	Birmingham City	64	(9)
2011–2012	Ipswich Town	29	(2)
Total		489	(68)

International career
1994–1995	England U18	6	(0)
1995–2000	England U21	13	(4)
2002	England	1	(0)

Managerial career
- 2018–2021: Charlton Athletic
- 2021–2022: Birmingham City
- 2023–2025: Montserrat
- * Club domestic league appearances and goals

Lee David Bowyer (/ˈboʊjər/; born 3 January 1977) is an English football manager and former professional player who played as a midfielder.

Bowyer featured for Charlton Athletic, Leeds United, West Ham United (two spells), Newcastle United, Birmingham City and Ipswich Town in over 18 years as a professional. He made 397 appearances in the Premier League, took part in semi-finals of the UEFA Cup and UEFA Champions League with Leeds and won the Football League Cup with Birmingham in 2011. Bowyer was capped once by the England national team. His career was punctuated by various incidents both on and off the field.

Bowyer has managed two of the clubs for which he formerly played. After three years in charge of Charlton Athletic, he left to become Birmingham City's manager in March 2021 and was sacked at the end of the following season. In September 2023 he was appointed as the head coach of Montserrat.

== Club career ==
=== Charlton Athletic ===
Born in Canning Town, London, Bowyer played for youth team Senrab before joining Charlton Athletic as a schoolboy. He turned professional in April 1994. He first drew attention in 1995, when he and teammate Dean Chandler failed a drugs test for cannabis use. Bowyer was dropped from the England under-18 squad and suspended for eight weeks while he took part in a rehabilitation course organised by the Football Association (the FA). He went on to become a first-team regular, making 58 appearances for Charlton and scoring 14 goals. A particular highlight was Bowyer's hat-trick in a memorable 5–4 victory over Wimbledon FC in a League Cup second round first leg tie in September 1995.

=== Leeds United ===
In 1996, he was signed by Leeds United manager Howard Wilkinson for £2.8 million, which was a record for a British teenager. Later the same year, Bowyer was convicted of affray and fined £4,500 following an incident in a McDonald's restaurant in London in which CCTV footage showed Bowyer throwing chairs and racially abusing a staff member of Asian origin.

Initially, Bowyer was kept out of Leeds' first team by Alf-Inge Haaland and David Hopkin; he eventually replaced Hopkin in the 1998–99 season, and from then on was a first-team regular. He was a key player in David O'Leary's Leeds side that qualified for the Champions League in 1999–2000, and which reached the semi-finals of the UEFA Cup in 2000 and the Champions League in 2001. In the Champions League run he scored crucial goals against A.C. Milan, Barcelona and Anderlecht. He was voted the Leeds player of the year by supporters in both 1998–99 and 2000–01.

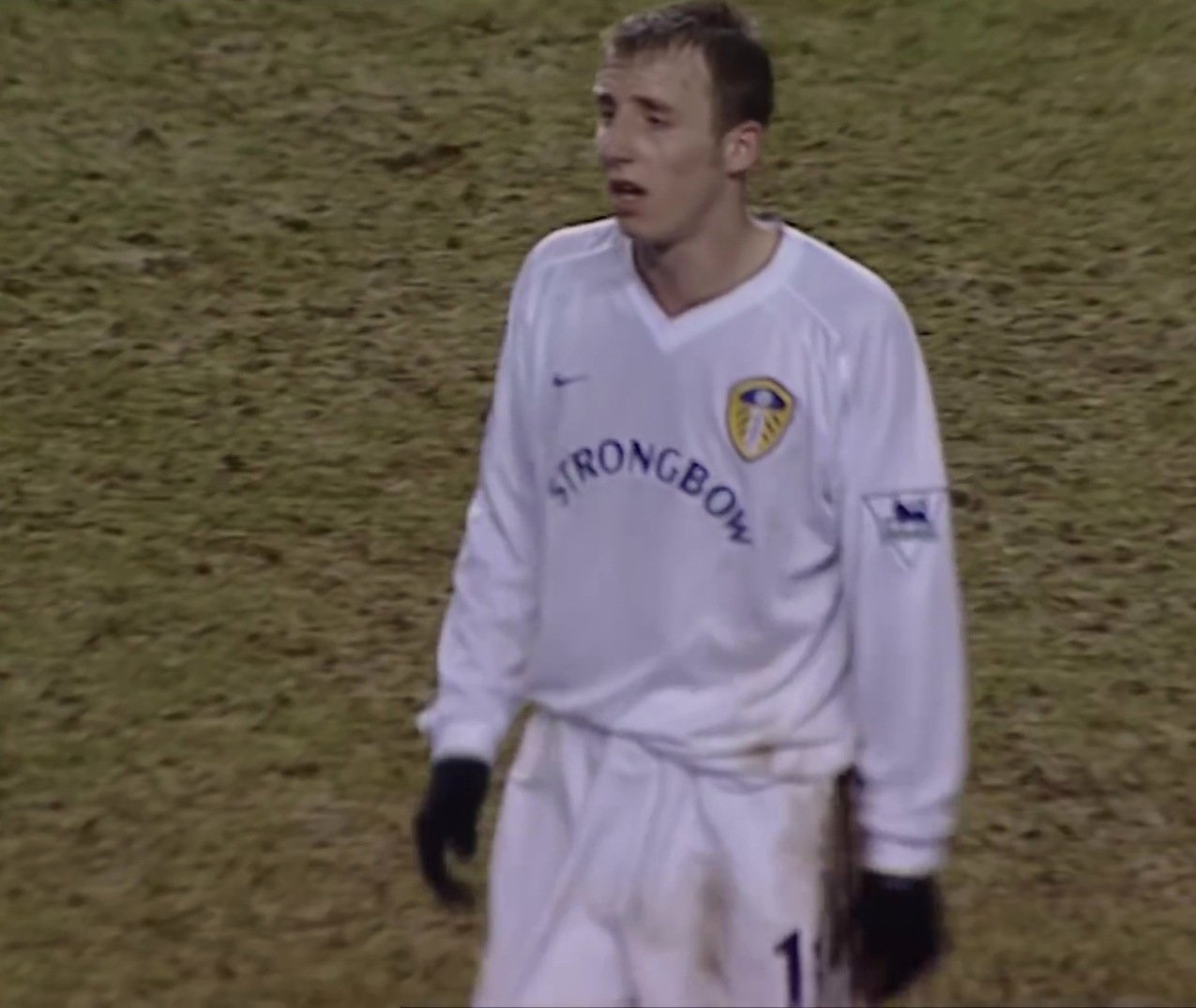
Bowyer with Leeds United in 2001.

Following an incident near a Leeds nightclub in January 2000, in which an Asian student suffered severe injuries, Bowyer and teammate Jonathan Woodgate were charged with causing grievous bodily harm with intent and affray. An initial trial at Kingston upon Hull Crown Court collapsed in April 2001 after an article in a Sunday newspaper, and following a second trial at the same venue which ended in December 2001, Bowyer was cleared of both charges while Woodgate was convicted of affray and sentenced to community service. Bowyer was generally recognised as playing some of the finest football of his career during this period and would often go straight from court to play for Leeds. In 2005, the player agreed a £170,000 out-of-court settlement of a civil action for damages brought by the victim and his brother, who had been less seriously hurt in the assault.

After Bowyer's acquittal, Leeds fined him four weeks' wages for a breach of the club's code of conduct. Despite having had the backing of the club during the trial and the club paying his extensive legal fees, Bowyer took exception to the fine and was placed on the transfer list. The dispute was later settled and Bowyer removed from the transfer list, though he returned to it at the end of the season after turning down a new five-year contract. A £9 million fee was agreed for a move to Liverpool, which fell through with manager Gérard Houllier not convinced the player had the "hunger or desire" to play for the club. In January 2003, Bowyer signed for West Ham United. He had made 265 appearances for Leeds in all competitions, scoring 55 goals.

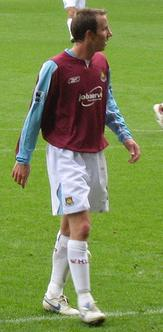
Bowyer playing for West Ham United in 2006

=== West Ham United ===
Bowyer signed for West Ham United on an initial six-month contract for a nominal transfer fee, which meant that should West Ham be relegated at the end of the 2002–03 season, the club would not be burdened with a large Premiership salary. The transfer was not popular with a section of West Ham supporters who questioned Bowyer's attitude towards racism. A protest against his signing was held outside Upton Park before Bowyer's introduction to the crowd. Claims that Bowyer would have received a £1 million bonus had West Ham stayed up were denied by the club's then manager Glenn Roeder. In the event, Bowyer was hampered by ankle injuries and made only eleven appearances for West Ham. West Ham were relegated and Bowyer was not offered another contract.

=== Newcastle United ===
After West Ham were relegated at the end of the 2002–03 season, Bowyer joined Newcastle United on a free transfer in July 2003.

In April 2005, Bowyer was in the media spotlight again after an on-pitch fight with teammate Kieron Dyer in Newcastle United's Premier League match with Aston Villa. This resulted in a red card, plus an automatic three-game ban, for each player. The Football Association fined Bowyer £30,000 and imposed an additional three-game ban, and the club fined him six weeks' wages; Dyer was not fined as Bowyer had thrown the first punch. In addition, Bowyer was charged by Northumbria Police in connection with the brawl with offences under section four of the Public Order Act. He pleaded guilty to the charge of using threatening behaviour and was fined £600 and ordered to pay £1,000 costs.

Bowyer made 98 appearances for Newcastle in all competitions and scored 11 goals.

=== Return to West Ham United ===
Bowyer rejoined West Ham United, the club he supported as a boy, in June 2006 for an undisclosed fee, declaring that he had "unfinished business" with the club. He made 22 appearances in the 2006–07 season, which was disrupted by a dislocated shoulder suffered in West Ham United's 6–0 loss to Reading in January 2007. However, Bowyer made a quick and sooner-than-expected recovery and played in five of West Ham's crucial games towards the end of the season.

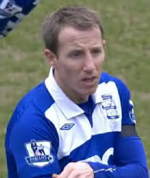
Bowyer playing for Birmingham City in 2010

He regained a regular place in the Hammers first team at the beginning of the 2007–08 season, scoring his first goals for West Ham against Wigan Athletic and Middlesbrough, and then two more in the 5–0 victory over Derby County.

=== Birmingham City ===
In January 2009, Bowyer signed for Birmingham City on loan until the end of the 2008–09 season. He made his debut on 17 January at home to Cardiff City in the Championship, scoring an equalising goal in the fourth minute of stoppage time to make the score 1–1. Following the expiry of his contract with West Ham United, Bowyer signed a two-year contract with Birmingham in July 2009. He scored winning goals in consecutive Premier League matches, against Fulham and Wolverhampton Wanderers, to take Birmingham into a mid-table position at the end of November, and was part of the team that went on a run of 15 games unbeaten in all competitions, including a club record 12 unbeaten in the top flight, as they finished in ninth place, the club's best for more than 50 years.

In September 2010 Bowyer was forced to apologise for verbally abusing a West Bromwich Albion supporter. The incident occurred following Bowyer's substitution after he had committed a rash challenge on Gabriel Tamaș. In the absence through injury of Craig Gardner, Bowyer returned to the starting eleven for the match against champions Chelsea in November 2010, and scored the only goal of the game to give his team a surprise victory, and then followed that up with a late equaliser against Manchester United. In January 2011, television replays highlighted incidents, unnoticed by the match referee, in which Bowyer stamped on Arsenal defender Bacary Sagna and appeared to rake his studs down the same player's Achilles. Suggestions in the media that Bowyer could receive a six-match ban prompted Birmingham manager Alex McLeish to argue that the football authorities were not treating all clubs equally when using television evidence. Bowyer received the standard three-match ban for violent conduct.

From 2010, Bowyer held the record for most yellow cards received in the Premier League; by the end of that year, he had 98 yellow cards in the competition as well as five red. (Note: Some media sources reported that the booking received on 5 March 2011 made him the first player to reach 100 yellow cards in the Premier League, although the Premier League recorded it as his 99th. As clarified by ESPNsoccernet statistician Norman Hubbard, although Bowyer had been shown 100 yellow cards, official statistics "do not count games in which two bookings led to a sending-off", so by standard definitions, he had only 99 that counted as yellow cards. As of August 2014, no player has reached 100 Premier League yellow cards.)

He made his first appearance in a major final in February 2011, in the starting eleven as Birmingham defeated favourites Arsenal 2–1 in the League Cup Final at Wembley Stadium. At that time, it was reported that he was not to be offered a contract extension, in May, McLeish indicated an offer would be made, but after Birmingham's relegation to the Championship, Bowyer left the club when his contract expired at the end of the 2010–11 season.

=== Ipswich Town and retirement ===
On 10 July 2011, Bowyer joined Ipswich Town on a free transfer. He signed a one-year contract. He scored his first goal for Ipswich with a late winner against former club West Ham United on 27 September. He was released at the end of the 2011–12 season, having scored twice in 29 appearances, after which Bowyer retired from playing.

== International career ==
During his early career at Leeds, Bowyer played for the England under-21 team, making 13 appearances for the national side.

Bowyer's form during the 2000–01 season led to calls for inclusion in the England squad; however, the Football Association ruled that he could not be selected until the court case in relation to an assault on an Asian student was completed. The FA eventually cleared Bowyer for selection following the conclusion of the court case and England manager Sven-Göran Eriksson called him into the squad for an international friendly against Portugal in September 2002. Bowyer made his England debut in the game, setting up a goal for Leeds teammate Alan Smith. It was his only appearance for England.

== Managerial career ==
In the autumn of 2015, Bowyer spent a month as a guest coach of Watford's under-21 team, working under former Leeds teammate Harry Kewell. After coaching at his first professional club Charlton Athletic, Bowyer was appointed as their assistant manager under Karl Robinson on 1 July 2017.

=== Charlton Athletic ===
On 22 March 2018, Bowyer was named caretaker manager of Charlton Athletic after former manager Karl Robinson left by mutual consent. His managerial career began with a 2–0 win two days later against Plymouth Argyle After winning his first three games, in April he was given the role until the end of the season. His spell in charge ended on 13 May after Charlton were beaten 2–0 on aggregate by Shrewsbury Town in the League One play-off semi final. On 14 June, Bowyer was renamed caretaker manager until further notice, and on 6 September, his role was made permanent on a contract lasting until the end of the season.

In Bowyer's first full season at the club, he guided the side to a third-placed finish in League One, and they faced Doncaster Rovers in the play-offs over two legs. Charlton won the away leg 2–1, courtesy of goals from Joe Aribo and Lyle Taylor. Doncaster's 88th-minute goal meant the second leg finished 3–3 in normal time. Both teams scored in extra time, resulting in a 4–4 aggregate score, and Charlton won the penalty shootout 4–3. They earned promotion to the Championship by beating Sunderland 2–1 in the play-off final at Wembley Stadium, returning to the second tier of English football after a three-season absence.

On 17 June 2019, Bowyer turned down the offer of a contract extension, with the club (and owner Roland Duchatelet) announcing that Bowyer and the club were unable to reach an agreement. However, he later reversed his decision by signing a new year-long deal. In October, he received a three-match touchline ban for "improper conduct and/or questioning the integrity of a match official". Following the club's takeover by East Street Investments, Bowyer signed a new three-year deal on 22 January 2020. Charlton were relegated on the final day of the 2019–20 season following a 4–0 defeat at his former club, Leeds United.

Bowyer resigned as Charlton manager on 15 March 2021.

=== Birmingham City ===
On 16 March 2021, Bowyer replaced Aitor Karanka as head coach of Birmingham City; he signed a two-and-a-half-year contract. After 16 months in charge, Bowyer was sacked on 2 July 2022. During his final season in charge, Birmingham finished in 20th in the EFL Championship and won just four games in 26 after November 2021.

=== Montserrat ===
Bowyer took charge of the Montserrat national football team in September 2023, winning his opening game 3–2 against Barbados. Bowyer won four of his 14 games in charge, and was replaced by Angus Eve for their June 2025 fixtures after relegation to CONCACAF Nations League C and losing their first two 2026 World Cup qualifiers.

== Career statistics ==
=== Club ===
Appearances and goals by club, season and competition
Club	Season	League			FA Cup		League Cup		Other		Total	
Club	Season	Division	Apps	Goals	Apps	Goals	Apps	Goals	Apps	Goals	Apps	Goals
Charlton Athletic	1994–95	First Division	5	0	0	0	1	0	—		6	0
Charlton Athletic	1995–96	First Division	41	8	3	1	6	5	2 (Note: Appearances in Football League First Division play-offs)	0	52	14
Charlton Athletic	Total		46	8	3	1	7	5	2	0	58	14
Leeds United	1996–97	Premier League	32	4	4	2	0	0	—		36	6
Leeds United	1997–98	Premier League	25	3	3	0	3	1	—		31	4
Leeds United	1998–99	Premier League	35	9	4	0	2	0	4 (Note: Appearances in UEFA Cup)	0	45	9
Leeds United	1999–2000	Premier League	33	5	3	1	1	0	11	5	48	11
Leeds United	2000–01	Premier League	38	9	1	0	0	0	15 (Note: Appearances in UEFA Champions League)	6	54	15
Leeds United	2001–02	Premier League	25	5	1	0	1	0	3	2	30	7
Leeds United	2002–03	Premier League	15	3	0	0	1	0	5	0	21	3
Leeds United	Total		203	38	16	3	8	1	38	13	265	55
West Ham United	2002–03	Premier League	10	0	1	0	—		—		11	0
Newcastle United	2003–04	Premier League	24	2	0	0	0	0	1	0	25	2
Newcastle United	2004–05	Premier League	27	3	2	1	1	0	9	3	39	7
Newcastle United	2005–06	Premier League	28	1	2	0	1	0	3 (Note: Appearances in UEFA Intertoto Cup)	1	34	2
Newcastle United	Total		79	6	4	1	2	0	13	4	98	11
West Ham United	2006–07	Premier League	20	0	0	0	0	0	2	0	22	0
West Ham United	2007–08	Premier League	15	4	2	0	3	0	—		20	4
West Ham United	2008–09	Premier League	6	0	0	0	1	1	—		7	1
West Ham United	Total		51	4	3	0	4	1	2	0	60	5
Birmingham City (loan)	2008–09	Championship	17	1	—		—		—		17	1
Birmingham City	2009–10	Premier League	35	5	5	0	2	1	—		42	6
Birmingham City	2010–11	Premier League	29	4	1	0	5	1	—		35	5
Birmingham City	Total		81	10	6	0	7	2	—		94	12
Ipswich Town	2011–12	Championship	29	2	0	0	0	0	—		29	2
Career total			489	68	32	5	28	9	55	17	604	99

=== International ===
Appearances and goals by national team and year
National team	Year	Apps	Goals
England	2002	1	0
Total		1	0

=== Managerial ===
As of match played 18 November 2024

Managerial record by team and tenure
Team	From	To	Record					Ref(s)
Team	From	To	P	W	D	L	Win %	Ref(s)
Charlton Athletic	22 March 2018	15 March 2021	157	64	37	56	40.8	
Birmingham City	16 March 2021	2 July 2022	59	17	16	26	28.8	
Montserrat	September 2023	November 2024	14	4	0	10	28.6	
Total			230	85	53	92	37.0	

== Honours ==
=== Player ===
Birmingham City

- Football League Cup: 2010–11
- Football League Championship runner-up: 2008–09

Individual

- PFA Team of the Year: 1995–96 First Division
- Leeds United Player of the Year: 1998–99, 2000–01

=== Manager ===
Charlton Athletic

- EFL League One play-offs: 2019

Individual

- EFL League One Manager of the Month: November 2018, April 2019
