= Lee Sharpe =

English footballer (born 1971)

Personal information
- Full name: Lee Stuart Sharpe
- Date of birth: 27 May 1971 (age 55)
- Place of birth: Halesowen, England
- Height: 1.83 m (6 ft 0 in)
- Position: Left winger

Youth career
- –1987: Torquay United

Senior career*
Years	Team	Apps	(Gls)
1987–1988	Torquay United	14	(3)
1988–1996	Manchester United	193	(36)
1996–1999	Leeds United	30	(5)
1998–1999	→ Sampdoria (loan)	3	(0)
1999	→ Bradford City (loan)	9	(2)
1999–2002	Bradford City	47	(2)
2001	→ Portsmouth (loan)	17	(0)
2002	Exeter City	4	(1)
2003	Grindavík	7	(0)
2004	Garforth Town	21	(6)
Total		345	(55)

International career
1989–1990	England U21	8	(0)
1991–1993	England	8	(0)
1992	England B	1	(0)
- * Club domestic league appearances and goals

Lee Stuart Sharpe (born 27 May 1971) is an English former professional footballer, sports television pundit, reality television personality and golfer.

As a player, Sharpe was predominantly a left winger from 1988 to 2004. He notably played in the Premier League for Manchester United, Leeds United and Bradford City and in Serie A for Sampdoria. He also had spells in the Football League with Torquay United, Portsmouth and Exeter City before wrapping his career up in Iceland with Grindavík and in non-league football with Garforth Town. Sharpe's spell at Manchester United lasted eight years, during which he won three Premier League titles, two FA Cups, the Football League Cup, three FA Charity Shields and a European Cup Winners' Cup. He won a total of eight caps for England as well as one cap for the B team.

He retired from professional football in 2003, but achieved renewed fame after a number of reality television appearances on the likes of Celebrity Wrestling, Celebrity Love Island and Dancing on Ice, among others. He has also worked as a pundit largely abroad on international coverage of the Premier League for both ESPN Star and the Abu Dhabi Sports Channel.

In 2021, Sharpe began competing in professional golf tournaments.

== Club career ==
=== Torquay United ===
Sharpe, who was born in Halesowen, Worcestershire, was an Aston Villa supporter, but initially was a member of the academy at Birmingham City. Sharpe was released from Birmingham's academy aged 16 before his father got him a trial at Torquay United. He was subsequently signed by the Gulls and played 14 times in the 1987-88 season as they achieved a 5th place finish in the Football League Fourth Division before turning 17 until just after the season's end. He was soon on the radar of First and Second Division clubs and was sold to Manchester United in June 1988 for £200,000, a record fee at the time for a YTS player.

=== Manchester United ===
Sharpe made his debut for Manchester United on 24 September 1988 in a 2–0 win over West Ham United in the Football League First Division, aged 17. His first team chances increased in November with the departure of the club's first choice left winger Jesper Olsen, and were further enhanced when new signing Ralph Milne performed inconsistently. Sharpe ended the 1988–89 season with 22 league appearances to his name, although he failed to score and United finished a disappointing 11th in the league a year after finishing second. He played 30 games in all competitions that season, and was on the shortlist for the PFA Young Player of the Year award, which was won by Arsenal winger Paul Merson.

The following season, Sharpe found the net for the first time in a United shirt, scoring in the 5–1 home win over Millwall on 16 September 1989. He managed 18 appearances in the league that season (and 20 in all competitions), but failed to make the squad for the FA Cup final which United won 1–0 against Crystal Palace in a replay after drawing 3–3 in the first match. Alex Ferguson had chosen new signing Danny Wallace as his first choice left winger for the 1989–90 season.

He played a key part in United's success in the European Cup Winners' Cup in 1990–91 scoring with a left-foot shot into the top corner in the home leg of the semi-final against Legia Warsaw (1–1). He also famously scored a hat-trick against Arsenal at Highbury in the League Cup fourth round on 28 November 1990, a match which United won 6–2. Sharpe himself cites this as one of the best memories in his footballing career. He was now United's first choice left winger ahead of Danny Wallace, although a new rival for the left wing position was emerging in the shape of highly promising 17-year-old Ryan Giggs.

Having established himself as a left winger, Sharpe earned a call up to the England squad just before his 20th birthday, although he was unable to replace John Barnes as first choice left winger. He was then out of the game for long periods of time through injury and illness (he suffered from viral meningitis in the autumn of 1992) and when his fitness recovered, the form of Ryan Giggs meant he had normally to play out of position at left back (by now the preferred position for Denis Irwin) or on the right wing, competing for a place with Andrei Kanchelskis who had arrived in March 1991.

His first team opportunities were limited by injury and by the form of Giggs in the 1991-92 season, although he did appear as a substitute in the Football League Cup final victory over Nottingham Forest.

He did play in enough games to collect a Premier League title medal for the 1992–93 season, and added another in 1993–94 with 30 appearances (four as a substitute), and scoring nine league goals (11 in all competitions). He scored both of United's goals in their fourth league game of the season on 23 August 1993 as they beat Aston Villa 2–1 at Villa Park, following with an early goal in the 3–1 win at Southampton in the next game. He managed another double on 22 March 1994 in a 2–2 league draw at Arsenal, and came on as a substitute in the FA Cup final against Chelsea. United won the double of the Premier League title and FA Cup that season.

Sharpe is well remembered for his memorable goal against Barcelona during the 2–2 draw in the 1994–1995 Champions League season's group stage, when he spectacularly back-heeled a cross from Roy Keane into the corner of the net. He also got an assist in this game, crossing for Mark Hughes, who headed the first goal of the game.

1994–95 was a difficult season for United, with many players out for significant periods due to injury. Sharpe was one of them, as he missed a string of mid season games due to a fractured ankle, though he had more opportunities to play on the left wing as Ryan Giggs missed a quarter of the campaign due to injuries. He also made a number of appearances as left-back as the regular player in that position, Denis Irwin, spent most of the campaign playing on the right side of defence left vacant by a long absence by Paul Parker, though Irwin was back at left-back towards the end of the season following the emergence of right-back Gary Neville.

United ended the season without a major trophy, finishing second to Blackburn Rovers in the Premier League as they failed to manage anything better than a 1–1 draw at West Ham on the final day of the season, and losing 1–0 to Everton in the FA Cup final.

By the start of the 1995–96, Andrei Kanchelskis had been sold to Everton and it seemed possible that Sharpe could establish himself as United's right winger – particularly when he scored twice for United in their 3–2 win over Everton on 9 September 1995.

With Ryan Giggs returning to fitness on the left wing, and Denis Irwin returning to left back following the emergence of Gary Neville as the club's regular right back, the right hand side of midfield seemed Sharpe's best opportunity of regular first team action. However, 20-year-old David Beckham made the first team breakthrough that season and left Sharpe facing a fresh battle for a regular place in the first team, though he was selected in the squad for all but eight competitive games that season, during which United became the first English team to win the double twice. He still took to the field in 31 out of 38 Premier League games, scoring four goals. His first goal of the season came at Blackburn Rovers on 28 August, as a relatively strong United side recorded their third successive league win after being beaten by Aston Villa on the opening day. In their next game at Everton on 9 September, Sharpe scored twice as United achieved an impressive 3–2 win. His next (and final) league goal for United came on 10 February 1996 when he scored the only goal of the game against Blackburn Rovers, as United kept up the pressure on leaders Newcastle who had been 10 points ahead at Christmas. Sharpe also managed two FA Cup goals that season, the winner against Manchester City in the fifth round at Old Trafford on 18 February, and the second in the last minute of a 2–0 home win over Southampton in the quarter finals on 11 March. He was selected as a substitute in the 1–0 FA Cup final win over Liverpool on 11 May, but did not come onto the pitch, though he still picked up his second FA Cup winner's medal, which was ultimately the last major trophy of his career just before his 25th birthday. In total he played 265 games for Manchester United over eight years, scoring 36 goals and winning a total of seven major trophies.

=== Leeds United ===
After eight years at Old Trafford, he became Leeds United's joint record signing on 10 August 1996 when they paid £4.5million for his services, making him the last signing by manager Howard Wilkinson, who was sacked the following month to be succeeded by George Graham. Again his time at Leeds was beset by further injuries. He made 26 Premiership appearances in 1996–97, scoring five goals, but a pre-season knee injury ruled him out for the entire 1997–98 season and he was unable to regain his place in the team on recovery. In the autumn of 1998, Graham's successor David O'Leary loaned Sharpe to Italian Serie A strugglers Sampdoria, where he played under English head coach David Platt, but soon fell out of favour and in the New Year he returned to England.

=== Bradford City ===
He signed on loan for Bradford City in March 1999 and he helped in securing the club's promotion to the Premiership after 77 years outside the top division. He joined Bradford in a £250,000 deal during the summer and helped preserve the club's Premiership status in 1999–2000.

=== Portsmouth ===
In 2000–01, Sharpe lost his place in the Bradford team and just before Christmas went on loan to Division One Portsmouth. He played 17 matches. He returned to Bradford during the 2001–02 season but when his contract expired at the end of the season he was given a free transfer.

=== Exeter City ===
Following a brief trial stay with Grimsby Town in the summer of 2002 he was snubbed a contract with the Mariners and he eventually signed for Exeter City. During his time at Exeter he scored once against Hull City. This would prove to be Sharpe's final spell in English senior football at the age of 31.

=== Grindavik ===
He then moved to Grindavík in Iceland. In June 2003 he announced his retirement from professional football at the age of 32. Just before this, he was rumoured to be on the verge of taking over as player-manager at Bury in Division Three.

=== Garforth Town ===
In February 2004, Sharpe made a brief return to football in the Kidderminster Sunday League with Hoobrook Crown before signing for Northern Counties East Premier League side Garforth Town the following summer.

== International career ==
Sharpe was capped eight times by England between 1991 and 1993.

== Television career ==
Sharpe has also developed a career in reality television. He appeared as a competitor in the 2005, ITV television show Celebrity Wrestling, under the name "Sharpe Shooter". He is also known though for appearing in Celebrity Love Island in 2005. During his time on the island, Sharpe courted the attentions of many of the show's ladies, most notably TV presenter Jayne Middlemiss, who confessed to "never having felt like this before about someone", but Sharpe eventually dated Abi Titmuss.

In 2007 Sharpe appeared as a contestant in ITV's Dancing on Ice. He was eliminated from the competition on 3 March 2007.

Sharpe, alongside former Bucks Fizz singer Cheryl Baker, currently fronts a London Underground advertising campaign for Nourkrin, a baldness treatment. He is billed as "Of Celebrity Love Island fame!"

In 2008, Sharpe starred in Dec's team on Ant versus Dec, on Saturday Night Takeaway ITV1. Sharpe also starred as the celebrity 'hider' in an episode of the CBBC show Hider in the House. He also appeared in the 2008 television series Superstars on Channel Five.

In August 2009, he appeared in the RTÉ One celebrity boxing series, Charity Lords of the Ring.

In 2019 and 2020, Sharpe featured in both seasons of ITV show Harry's Heroes, which featured former football manager Harry Redknapp attempting to get a squad of former England international footballers back fit and healthy for a game against Germany legends.

== Media career ==
After retirement in 2004 and 2006, Sharpe became a football pundit for ESPN Star in Singapore in Asia, and together with Les Ferdinand, is a celebrity host on the game show "Kickoff". Sharpe was previously a pundit on BBC's Match of the Day 2 and Football Focus, and during the 2006 World Cup presented a vlog for Yahoo. Sharpe appeared in one episode of the football drama Dream Team.

Sharpe was one of the football pundits hired by Abu Dhabi Sports Channel, for their exclusive coverage of the Premier League.

== Personal life ==
In the early 1990s, Sharpe was part of a new direction in football that saw photogenic players like him, Jamie Redknapp and Ryan Giggs emerge as merchandising and mass marketed "poster boys" of the game, and fronted many football magazine covers and featured in advertisements. By the mid-1990s, these players, some of whom (notably the Liverpool FA cup final team dressed in white suits before the game) had become known as Spice Boys, had become icons in football already, in an era when football stars had become idols on par with rock stars and pop stars. Sharpe was known for his lifestyle off the pitch as much as he had on it at the time, though these endorsement deals quieted down after he left Manchester United in 1996.

On 25 August 2005, Sharpe's autobiography My Idea of Fun was published, describing his time as a footballer and his resulting celebrity status. In the book Sharpe described his relationship with former United manager Alex Ferguson and referred to him as a "bully". In more recent interviews he has since gone on to criticise Ferguson for blanking him when the two have crossed paths at future events organised by Manchester United.

In October 2021, Sharpe and his family moved to Xàbia, Spain. That December, he opened a sports bar named "Sharpey's". The bar closed in 2022.

== Career statistics ==
Appearances and goals by club, season and competition
Club	Season	League			National cup (Note: Includes FA Cup)		League cup (Note: Includes Football League Cup)		Europe		Other		Total	
Club	Season	Division	Apps	Goals	Apps	Goals	Apps	Goals	Apps	Goals	Apps	Goals	Apps	Goals
Manchester United	1988–89	First Division	22	0	6	0	2	0	0	0	0	0	30	0
Manchester United	1989–90	First Division	18	1	0	0	2	0	0	0	0	0	20	1
Manchester United	1990–91	First Division	23	2	3	0	7	6	8 (Note: Appearances in European Cup Winners' Cup)	1	0	0	41	9
Manchester United	1991–92	First Division	14	1	1	0	4	1	–		–		19	2
Manchester United	1992–93	Premier League	27	1	3	0	–		–		–		30	1
Manchester United	1993–94	Premier League	30	9	3	0	4	2	4 (Note: Appearances in UEFA Champions League)	0	–		41	11
Manchester United	1994–95	Premier League	28	3	7	1	2	0	3	2	1 (Note: Appearance in FA Charity Shield)	0	41	6
Manchester United	1995–96	Premier League	31	4	6	2	2	0	2 (Note: Appearances in UEFA Cup)	0	–		41	6
Manchester United	Total		193	21	29	3	23	9	17	3	1	0	263	36
Leeds United	1996–97	Premier League	26	5	1	0	3	1	–		–		30	6
Leeds United	1997–98	Premier League	–		–		–		–		–		0	0
Leeds United	1998–99	Premier League	4	0	–		–		3	0	–		7	0
Leeds United	Total		30	5	1	0	3	1	3	0	0	0	37	6
Sampdoria (loan)	1998–99	Serie A	3	0	–		–		–		–		3	0
Bradford City (loan)	1998–99	First Division	9	2	–		–		–		–		9	2
Bradford City	1999–2000	Premier League	17	0	2	0	1	0	–		–		20	0
Bradford City	2000–01	Premier League	10	0	–		2	0	3 (Note: Appearances in UEFA Intertoto Cup)	0	–		15	0
Bradford City	2001–02	First Division	18	2	1	0	1	0	–		–		21	2
Bradford City	Total		54	4	3	0	4	0	3	0	0	0	64	4
Portsmouth (loan)	2000–01	First Division	17	0	–		–		–		–		17	0
Career total			297	30	33	3	30	10	23	3	1	0	364	46

== Honours ==
Manchester United

- Premier League: 1992–93, 1993–94, 1995–96
- FA Cup: 1993–94, 1995–96
- Football League Cup: 1991–92; runner-up: 1990–91, 1993–94
- FA Charity Shield: 1990, 1993, 1994
- European Cup Winners' Cup: 1990–91

Individual

- PFA Young Player of the Year: 1990–91
- Football League Cup top scorer: 1990–91
