= Matt Clarke (footballer, born 1973) =

English footballer (born 1973)

Personal information
- Full name: Matthew John Clarke
- Date of birth: 3 November 1973 (age 52)
- Place of birth: Sheffield, England
- Height: 6 ft 4 in (1.93 m)
- Position: Goalkeeper

Youth career
- ?–1992: Rotherham United

Senior career*
Years	Team	Apps	(Gls)
1992–1996	Rotherham United	124	(0)
1996–1999	Sheffield Wednesday	4	(0)
1997–1998	→ Kidderminster Harriers (loan)	?	(?)
1999–2001	Bradford City	38	(0)
2001	→ Bolton Wanderers (loan)	8	(0)
2001	→ Fulham (loan)	0	(0)
2001–2004	Crystal Palace	38	(0)
Total		212+	(0)
- * Club domestic league appearances and goals

Matthew John Clarke (born 3 November 1973) is an English former football goalkeeper.

== Club career ==
Clarke's first club was Rotherham United, where his nickname was Matt the Cat, in reference to his agility. He won the 1996 Football League Trophy with Rotherham. He then signed with Sheffield Wednesday where he served as cover to Kevin Pressman.

He joined Bradford City after they won promotion to the Premier League in 1999 and helped Bolton Wanderers during a loan spell two years later into the Premier League, playing in the play-off final. His impressive displays for Bradford City led to many, including the Bradford supporters, calling for him to receive international selection.

In the summer of 2001 Clarke signed for newly promoted Premier League side Fulham on a one-month loan, which effectively acted as a trial. However, he returned to Bradford after just one week.

He later joined Crystal Palace but his career was curtailed by an injury he suffered which caused his premature retirement in 2004.

== Honours ==
Rotherham United

- Football League Trophy: 1995–96

Bolton Wanderers

- Football League First Division play-offs: 2001
