= Robert Molenaar =

Dutch footballer and manager

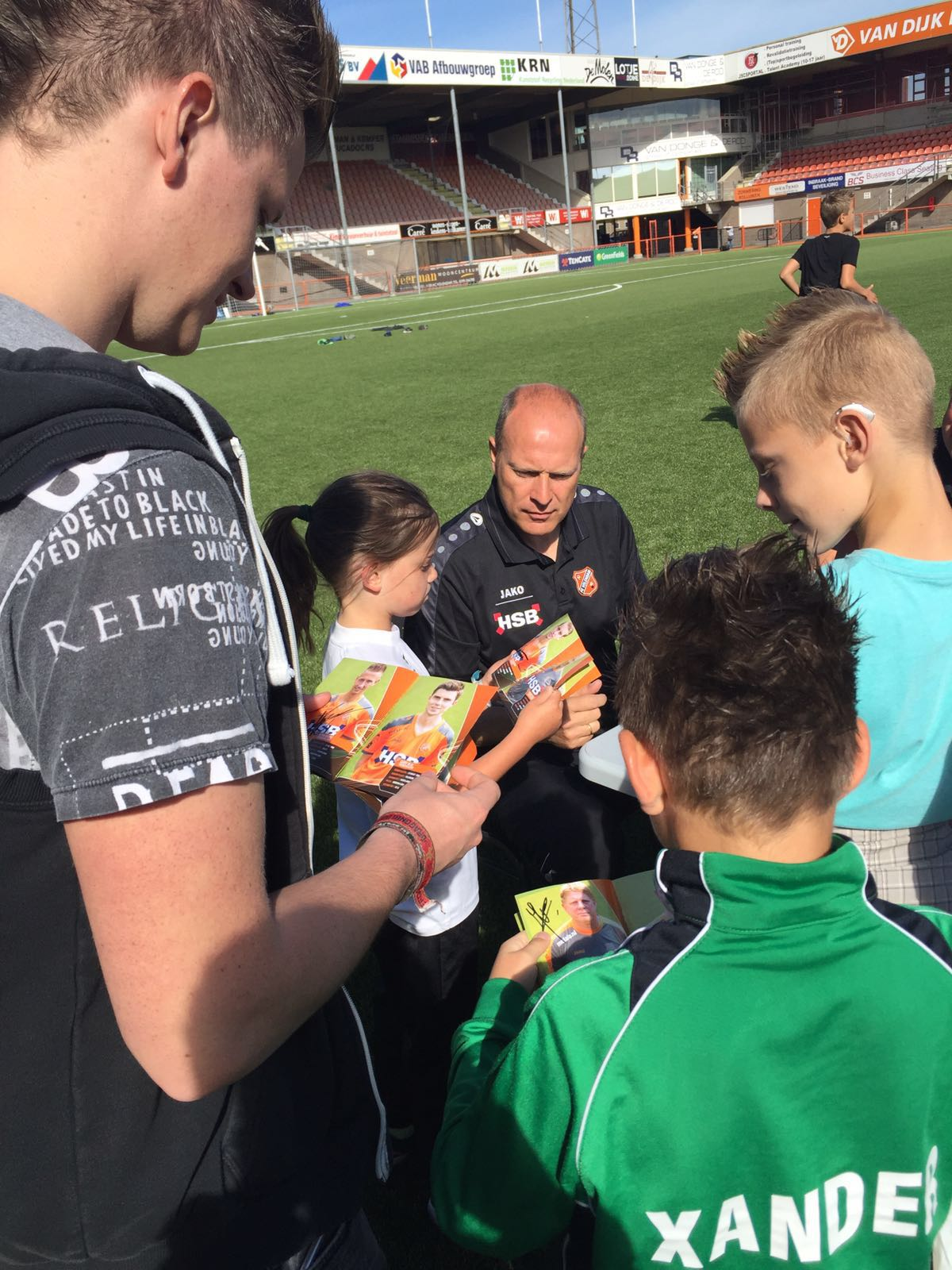
- Molenaar in 2016

Personal information
- Date of birth: 27 February 1969 (age 57)
- Place of birth: Zaandam, Netherlands
- Height: 1.88 m (6 ft 2 in)
- Position: Centre-back

Senior career*
Years	Team	Apps	(Gls)
1992–1997	FC Volendam	125	(2)
1997–2000	Leeds United	51	(5)
2000–2003	Bradford City	71	(2)
2003–2007	RBC Roosendaal	68	(6)
Total		315	(15)

Managerial career
- 2012–2013: NEC (assistant)
- 2014–2015: RKSV Halsteren
- 2015–2017: FC Volendam
- 2017–2019: Roda JC Kerkrade
- 2019: Almere City
- 2021–2022: Jong NAC
- 2022: NAC Breda
- 2024–2025: Schalke 04 (assistant)
- 2025–: Royal Antwerp (assistant)
- * Club domestic league appearances and goals

Robert Molenaar (born 27 February 1969) is a Dutch professional football coach and former player who works as an assistant coach at Royal Antwerp. He played as a centre-back for FC Volendam, Leeds United, Bradford City and RBC Roosendaal.

== Playing career ==
Molenaar was born in Zaandam, North Holland. He was signed for Leeds United by the then manager George Graham from FC Volendam for £1,000,000 in January 1997 to try to shore up the defence. He became a regular in the side until the end of the 1996–97 season. In the 1997–98 season however his performances were not up to scratch and he fell down the pecking order playing around half the matches. In the 1998–99 he was once again a first choice centre-back, above David Wetherall but a challenge by Nicolas Anelka, then playing for Arsenal, kept him out via ligament damage until 2000. He failed to make another appearance for Leeds United and was sold to Bradford City in the summer of 2000 to help their dog fight against relegation. He stayed there until 2003, scoring twice against Newcastle United and Nottingham Forest, when his contract was not renewed and he moved to RBC Roosendaal before eventually retiring in the summer of 2007.

== Managerial career ==
After working as assistant manager of NEC and manager of amateur side RKSV Halsteren, Molenaar was appointed manager of Eerste Divisie side FC Volendam from July 2015. In March 2017, it was announced that Molenaar would leave his role at the end of the season.

He was appointed as manager of Roda JC in June 2017 on a one-year contract with the option of a further year. He was sacked from his role at the club in March 2019.

In June 2019, he was appointed as manager of Almere City on a two-year contract, but was sacked in November of that year following a run of poor results.

On 13 July 2021, Molenaar was appointed as manager of Jong NAC, the reserve team of NAC Breda.

On 15 June 2022, NAC appointed Molenaar as head coach of the first team on a one-year deal, effective from 1 July 2022, replacing Edwin de Graaf. He was dismissed on 27 December 2022 due to poor results.

In October 2024, Molenaar joined Kees van Wonderen at Schalke 04. He started working there as Van Wonderen's assistant.

In June 2025, he became assistant coach to Stef Wils at Royal Antwerp. In November that year, he served as interim coach along with Faris Haroun following the dismissal of Wils.
