= JCT600 =

English group of car dealerships

JCT600 Ltd
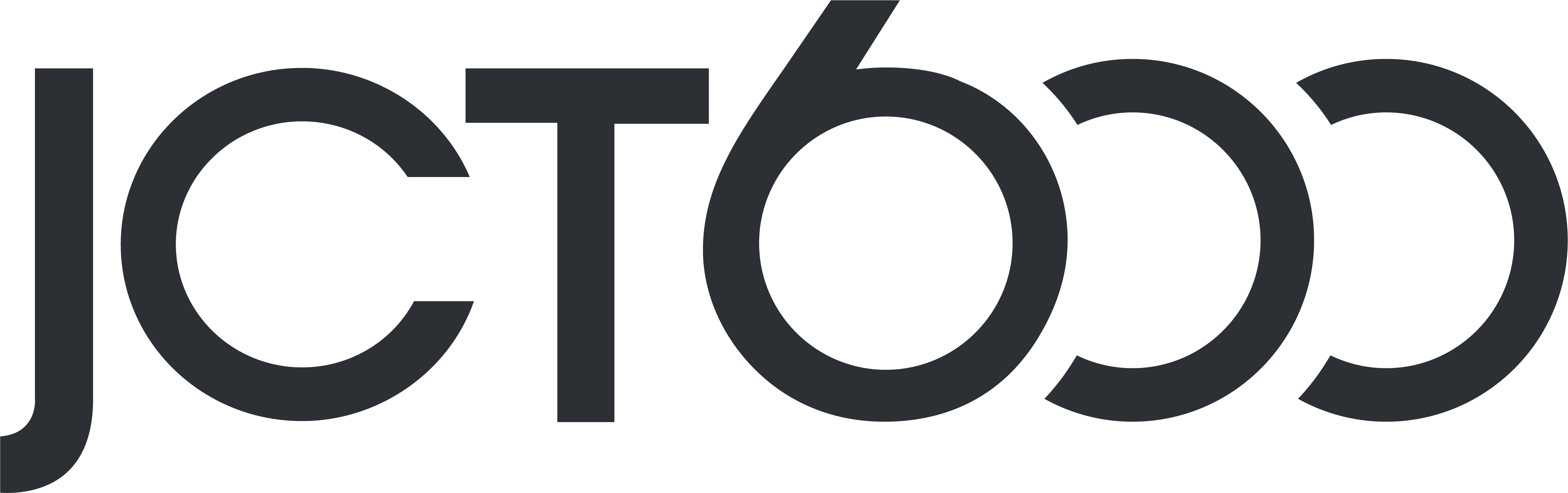
- Company type: Motor Retail Group
- Industry: Automotive
- Founded: 1946
- Founder: Jack Tordoff
- Headquarters: Apperley Lane, Bradford
- Number of locations: 53 (2023)
- Area served: Yorkshire; Derbyshire; Lincolnshire; North East; Nottinghamshire
- Key people: John Tordoff (CEO)
- Revenue: £1.3 billion (2021)
- Net income: £45 million (2021)
- Number of employees: 2,000–2,500 (2022)
- Website: https://www.jct600.co.uk/

JCT600 Ltd is an English group of privately owned car dealerships. The company operates in Yorkshire, Lincolnshire, Derbyshire, and the north east, and has 53 dealerships.

== Company history ==
The company, a family-owned business, in 1946 as a single garage shop on Sticker Lane in Bradford. Originally called Tordoff Motors, the company was established by Edward Tordoff, before being taken on by his son, Jack. Jack Tordoff was a successful rally driver in the 1960s and 1970s and winner of the Circuit of Ireland Rally in 1973. Tordoff developed the business over the next 70-plus years, founding JCT600, before his son and current chief executive officer, John Tordoff, took over in 2002. Jack Tordoff died aged 86 in 2021 following a lengthy illness.

The company name, JCT600, came from the personal number plate of a Mercedes-Benz 600 owned by Jack Tordoff, which he also used on his Porsche when he won the Circuit of Ireland Rally. The company employs over 2,400 colleagues, is one of UK's largest motor retailers, and has been a family-owned business for four generations

== Sponsorship ==
JCT600 sponsors Bradford City AFC, a third-division English football (soccer) club. This is one of the longest running partnerships in English Football League History. In July 2022, they established a three-year sponsorship deal which will extend the current agreement through to the 2025–26 season. JCT600 founder Jack Tordoff was an honorary life president and was a lifelong supporter of Bradford City AFC, regularly taking his two sons to Valley Parade throughout their childhood.

== Manufacturers ==
The company sells new cars from the following brands:

- Aston Martin
- Audi
- Bentley
- BMW
- Cupra
- Ferrari
- Jaguar
- Kia
- Land Rover
- Lotus
- Maserati
- Mercedes Benz
- MINI
- Porsche
- Rolls-Royce Motors
- SEAT
- Smart
- Volkswagen
- Volkswagen Commercial Vehicles
