= Andy Lee (footballer, born 1982) =

English footballer

Personal information
- Full name: Andrew Lee
- Date of birth: 18 August 1982 (age 44)
- Place of birth: Bradford, England
- Position: Midfielder

Youth career
- –2002: Bradford City

Senior career*
Years	Team	Apps	(Gls)
2002–2003	Bradford City	2	(0)
2003–2004	Aberystwyth Town	30	(2)
–	Wakefield & Emley	?	(?)
Total		32+	(2+)
- * Club domestic league appearances and goals

Andrew Lee (born 18 August 1982) is an English retired footballer who made two league appearances for Bradford City between 2002 and 2003. He signed for Aberystwyth Town in 2003 and also played for Wakefield & Emley. He was born in Bradford. He also played for Bradford Park Avenue and in 2010 won the Yorkshire Matchplay golf tournament.
