= Gareth Grant =

English footballer (born 1980)

Personal information
- Full name: Gareth Michael Grant
- Date of birth: 6 September 1980 (age 46)
- Place of birth: Leeds, England
- Position: Striker

Senior career*
Years	Team	Apps	(Gls)
1997–2002	Bradford City	24	(1)
1999	→ Halifax Town (loan)	3	(0)
2000	→ Bolton Wanderers (loan)	0	(0)
2001	→ Lincoln City (loan)	3	(0)
2002	Chester City	0	(0)
2002–2005	Gainsborough Trinity		
2005	→ Scarborough (loan)	1	(0)
2005–2006	Harrogate Town	34	(10)
2006–2008	Farsley Celtic^{A}	20	(4)
2008	Harrogate Town	12	(1)
2009–2010	Farsley Celtic		
2010	Droylsden	2	(0)
2010	Gainsborough Trinity		
2010–2013	Farsley		
2013	Ossett Town		
2013–2014	Pontefract Collieries		
2014	Frickley Athletic		
- * Club domestic league appearances and goals as of 21:10, 13 March 2010 (UTC)

Gareth Michael Grant (born 6 September 1980) is an English former footballer who played as a striker.

He played as a professional in the Premier League and the Football League for Bradford City, Halifax Town and Lincoln City. He also had spells as a professional with Bolton Wanderers and Chester City in which he did not make an appearance. He went on to feature in Non-league football with notable spells with Gainsborough Trinity, Harrogate Town and Farsley Celtic. He also had spells with Scarborough, Droylsden, Ossett Town, Pontefract Collieries and Frickley Athletic.

== Career ==
Grant made 30 appearances in the Football League for Bradford City, Halifax Town and Lincoln City. At Bradford he scored three goals, against FK Atlantas in the Intertoto Cup, Darlington in the League Cup and Portsmouth in the league. During his spell with Lincoln he scored once against Chesterfield in the Football League Trophy. After Lincoln, he played in non-League football for Chester City, for whom he made one start and scored two goals in the Cheshire Senior Cup against Cheadle Town. Grant also played for Gainsborough Trinity and Harrogate Town, where he scored 15 goals from 43 appearances in all competitions in the 2005–06 season. In the summer of 2006, Grant moved to Farsley Celtic and helped them to gain promotion to the Conference National in 2007, including scoring a goal in the play-off final win of that year. In February 2008, Grant re-signed for Harrogate Town in time for him to face his former team Gainsborough Trinity. He was released later that year, then spent nearly a year out of football before rejoining Farsley Celtic in March 2009. On 13 March 2010 Grant signed alongside his Farsley strike partner Lee Ellington for fellow Conference North side Droylsden, but left shortly afterwards to join former club Gainsborough Trinity. On 1 July 2010 he joined Farsley, moving on to join Ossett Town in July 2013.

In March 2014 he joined Frickley Athletic.

== Notes ==
A. These figures only include seasons in the Conference National, so are incomplete.
