= David Wetherall =

British footballer (born 1971)

Personal information
- Full name: David Wetherall
- Date of birth: 14 March 1971 (age 55)
- Place of birth: Sheffield, England
- Height: 6 ft 3 in (1.91 m)
- Position: Defender

Senior career*
Years	Team	Apps	(Gls)
1989–1991	Sheffield Wednesday	0	(0)
1991–1999	Leeds United	202	(12)
1999–2008	Bradford City	304	(18)
Total		506	(30)

Managerial career
- 2003: Bradford City (player-manager)
- 2007: Bradford City (caretaker)
- * Club domestic league appearances and goals

David Wetherall (born 14 March 1971) is an English football coach and former professional defender, who is an academy strategic advisor at Huddersfield Town.

As a player, he played most of his career in the Premier League for Leeds United and Bradford City. He started his playing career with Sheffield Wednesday but failed to make an appearance, then left for Leeds and made more than 200 appearances. Afterwards, he joined Bradford City for a then club-record fee of £1.4 million and played every minute of every match in his first season for the club and scored the decisive goal that kept the Bantams in the Premier League on the final day of the season. Wetherall became the team captain, later finishing his playing career at the end of the 2007–08 season.

He had two spells as caretaker manager of Bradford City and was an integral part of the club's coaching staff following his retirement as a player. He left Bradford in June 2011 after 12 years with the club to take up a position with the Football League and was inducted into Show Racism The Red Card's hall of fame for his involvement in their anti-racism campaign.

== Playing career ==
=== Early life and career ===
Wetherall was born in Sheffield, he supported Sheffield Wednesday as a child, He was capped by England at schoolboy level, and in 1989, when he left school, he signed for Wednesday under the management of Howard Wilkinson. Wetherall had attended Rotherham sixth form college where he achieved four A-levels at grade A, and chose to study for his BSc in chemistry at the University of Sheffield, so that he could live at home with his parents and combine his education with playing for Sheffield Wednesday's reserve team. He graduated with a first-class honours degree in 1992, becoming the first Premier League player to achieve such a qualification. In 1990, he was part of a British squad which travelled to Italy for the world student five-a-side football championship, and represented Great Britain as they won the association football bronze medal at the 1991 World Student Games hosted in Sheffield.

=== Leeds United ===
Wilkinson, by then Leeds United manager, returned to his former club in July 1991 to sign two young centre-backs, Jon Newsome first and Wetherall a few days later, for a combined fee of £275,000. The 20-year-old Wetherall's first season at Leeds was the final year of his degree course, so he played for the reserves while training part-time. He made a brief debut in the First Division, on 3 September 1991 at Elland Road as a late substitute against Arsenal; Leeds went on to win the 1991–92 league title. He remembers it as "With 20 minutes to go, we were 2–1 down and I was on the touchline ready to go on, then Lee Chapman scored and the gaffer (Howard Wilkinson) told me to sit down again. But he threw me on for the last two minutes. I always tell people that made the difference in winning the title!" As his teammates took the league trophy on a celebratory open top bus tour, Wetherall chose to revise for his examinations, a decision he came to regret, because "those experiences don't come around that often". Though the revision bore fruit: he graduated with first-class honours.

Wetherall made his first start for Leeds in the newly formed Premier League in September 1992 against Southampton, scored his first goal for the club the following March to secure a draw at home to Chelsea and finished the 1992–93 season with 13 league appearances. He "noticed a massive difference in [his] fitness coming in full-time after just having two blasts a week." In the 1993–94 season, he established himself as a regular first-team player. The following season, he scored in a 2–1 defeat of defending champions Manchester United, and continued his knack of scoring vital goals with a last-minute equaliser to avoid an embarrassing defeat by Walsall of Division Three in the 1995 FA Cup. In the replay, he scored for both Leeds and Walsall, the own goal taking the match into extra time. Leeds finished in fifth place in the league, and Wetherall was chosen manager Wilkinson's player of the season. Wilkinson also singled him out for praise for his performance in a 3–0 UEFA Cup first-round win against AS Monaco in Monaco in September 1995, though they were heavily defeated by PSV Eindhoven in the next round. Wetherall played in the League Cup Final in 1996, his first major final, but Leeds were outclassed, beaten 3–0 by Aston Villa.

In the 1996–97 season, Wetherall played less regularly as new manager George Graham experimented with defensive combinations, though by the following season he had re-established himself in the starting eleven, sometimes acting as captain, and signed a new five-year contract. On 27 September 1997, he scored in the 1–0 victory over arch-rivals Manchester United when Roy Keane's knee was badly injured in the act of fouling Alf-Inge Haaland, who then accused Keane of feigning injury. Keane later took revenge on Haaland during a Manchester derby and said to Haaland as he lay on the ground: "And don't ever stand over me again sneering about fake injuries, and tell your pal Wetherall there's some for him as well." Later that season Wetherall was among the Leeds travelling party who escaped unhurt as their aircraft crash-landed after an engine caught fire on takeoff.

When David O'Leary replaced Graham as manager it became clear that his centre-back pairing of choice would be Lucas Radebe and the 18-year-old Jonathan Woodgate, so Wetherall decided to leave Leeds for a club where he could play regular first-team football. A transfer to nearby Huddersfield Town fell through after terms had been agreed, and the player's reluctance to move house while wife Caroline was heavily pregnant with their second son caused him to reject an offer from Southampton. After eight years with Leeds, having scored 18 goals from 250 games in all competitions, he accepted an offer from fellow West Yorkshire club Bradford City.

=== Bradford City ===
Bradford City signed Wetherall for a club record £1.4 million, to give experience to a side who had just been promoted to the Premier League. Wetherall was aged just 28, but manager Paul Jewell had made a number of signings aged over 30, prompting journalists to call his team "Dad's Army". Bradford won their first game 1–0 with a last-minute goal at Middlesbrough scored by Dean Saunders who started a celebration pouring scorn at the club's cynics. Wetherall's first goal for Bradford was in a League Cup game at Reading before he scored again in the following round as Bradford were knocked out by Barnsley. His first league goal came in a 2–0 win against Newcastle United on 18 December. Wetherall missed only two cup game for Bradford City during his first season, and was the only player in the Premier League to have played every minute of the league season. His partnership with the emerging Andy O'Brien in central defence was the front line in Bradford's survival attempt. Bradford went into the final game of the season facing possible relegation. After only 12 minutes of their final game with Liverpool, Wetherall headed home a Gunnar Halle free-kick. Bradford held on for a 1–0 win and with Wimbledon's defeat at Southampton, Bradford stayed up with a then-record low of 36 points. The goal directly resulted in Wetherall's former club Leeds United qualifying for the next season's Champions League.

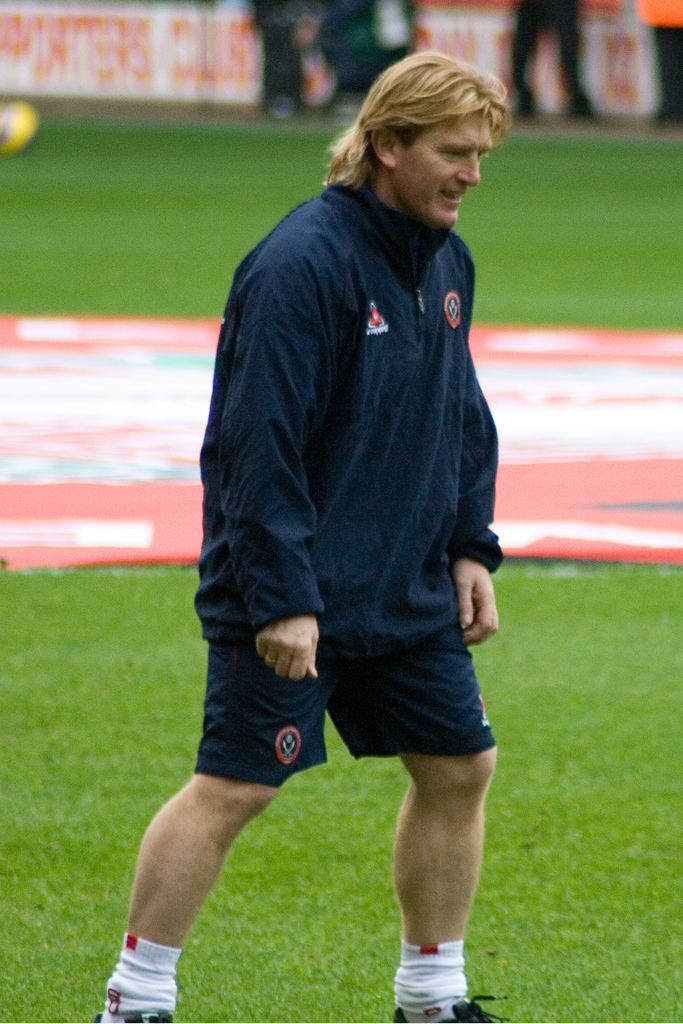
McCall, who reinstated Wetherall as captain when he returned to manage the club in 2007

The 2000–01 season started early for Bradford after chairman Geoffrey Richmond decided to enter the Intertoto Cup. Wetherall did not play in the team's first game away at FK Atlantas, and after playing in the second leg and the two third-round games, he missed the semi-final with Zenit St Petersburg because of an ankle injury. Bradford subsequently lost both legs. Wetherall started the league season but after playing all 52 league games since joining Bradford without leaving the field, Wetherall limped off before half-time during a 2–0 defeat to their nearest rivals Derby County in November 2000. Days after new manager Jim Jefferies took over, Wetherall was ruled out until the following February following a groin operation. His first game back was on 24 February 2001 as Bradford lost 2–1 to West Ham United. His return to league action lasted just four games when, after scoring in a 2–2 draw with Newcastle United, he was ruled out for the rest of the season with a recurrence of the groin injury. Bradford lost their Premier League status a month later after losing 2–1 at Everton.

Wetherall's start to the 2001–02 season was hampered by a groin injury and his first full game of the campaign came on 14 September 2001 when he scored in a 5–1 Division One victory over Gillingham, which put Bradford second in the table. A groin injury again kept Wetherall out of the side for nearly five months, during which time he was linked with moves back to the Premier League at either Southampton or Manchester City, but he opted to stay at Valley Parade. He returned from injury for a reserve game in March after four months out with just over two months of the season left. He returned to the side against Burnley in a game noted for Paul Gascoigne's debut for Burnley, and scored in his next game as Bradford eased any relegation worries by defeating Crewe Alexandra 2–0. He played in the club's final seven games and was named club captain for the following season after Stuart McCall left the club.

Wetherall was one of 19 senior first-team players to be laid off by chairman Richmond in May 2002, after the club were put into administration and the players unpaid since April. Those players went as far as taking strike action before a pre-season friendly at Hull City, even though Wetherall, as their Professional Footballers' Association representative, had initially denied they would do so, before the club was saved and players reinstated. Wetherall played in the club's opening game of the season as Bradford drew 0–0 with Wolverhampton Wanderers live on television, but was again ruled out through an injury, this time to his hip. A planned comeback was put off five weeks later, before he sought the advice of a specialist in Denmark. After sitting out another three months through injury, Wetherall made his return as a substitute against Gillingham in December 2002 but was again injured in a reserve team comeback three days later. He again returned in February 2003 against Coventry City and played 15 games during the final three months of the season.

Wetherall kept off his injury problems and played in the first 15 games of the 2003–04 season, but was ruled out for two months after suffering medial ligament damage, following a knee injury sustained during the club's 1–0 defeat to Watford. He returned on 28 December 2003 in a 1–0 victory which gave Bradford their first win in six games. His return to the defence added a second successive clean sheet. The revival in form was short-lived and despite Wetherall missing just one more game, when he sustained a calf injury, Bradford were threatened with another relegation. Wetherall scored a header against Reading in a 2–1 win and gave Bradford a "slim chance" of avoiding relegation, only for that to be confirmed two weeks later after a 3–2 defeat to Wimbledon.

Despite the club's relegation to League One and another spell in administration, Wetherall turned down a move away from Bradford City after snubbing Coventry City during the 2004 summer. In October 2004, Wetherall and fellow veteran player Dean Windass both signed year's extensions to their contracts, with Wetherall's keeping him at Bradford until the end of the 2007–08 season. He also put his injury problems to one side for the 2004–05 season and missed just one league game – a 1–1 draw with Walsall in February when he was ruled out because of suspension ending his run of 42 consecutive games. Bradford manager Colin Todd had identified Wetherall as a key player for the season, but despite scoring four goals and striker Windass' 27 goals earning him the league's top scorer's crown, Bradford could only finish 11th.

In October 2006, days after playing his 250th game for Bradford, he signed a new deal keeping him at the club until 2010 with a clause allowing him to move into a coaching role when his playing career ended or continue playing beyond 2010. He received the first red card of his career in a 2–2 draw with Cheltenham Town on 30 December for two bookable offences.

"Lots of players end their careers through injury or get left out and struggle. No, it is the right decision for me and the club. I have had a good and long career."

— David Wetherall, when questioned about whether his career ended in the way he would have liked.

When he took over as Bradford caretaker manager, Wetherall stepped down as captain and instead handed the armband to centre-back partner Mark Bower. But when McCall was appointed the new manager in June 2007, Wetherall was reinstated as club captain for the 2007–08 season. On 20 February 2008, he announced the 2007–08 season would be his last as a player, although Bradford City would keep his registration, and instead he would join the club's coaching staff. Wetherall said: "I was becoming increasingly frustrated at not being able to do the things that I used to be able to do. Situations I would normally deal with comfortably were suddenly becoming a struggle." Bradford fans held a special day to celebrate Wetherall's career, when they took banners and wore fancy dress and laboratory coats during the club's 1–1 draw with Rotherham United on 22 March 2008. In his penultimate month as a footballer, Wetherall was also named the League Two fans' player of the month by the Professional Footballers' Association. He played his final game for Bradford against Wycombe Wanderers on 3 May 2008 in a 2–1 defeat.

== Managerial career ==
Wetherall was one of four senior players to act as Bradford City manager for two weeks during November 2003, following the sacking of Nicky Law. He, as well as Peter Atherton, Wayne Jacobs and Dean Windass oversaw training but just one game when Bradford City lost 1–0 to Stoke City with Jacobs taking charge from the touchline. Wetherall took his first full steps into management on a caretaker basis when he was appointed player-manager at Bradford City following the sacking of Colin Todd on 12 February 2007. The side were on a poor run of form but Wetherall, whose role was extended in March, could not reverse the fortunes and the side were relegated to League Two. During Wetherall's short stint in charge the club won just two games and drew another four. During his spell in charge of Bradford, Wetherall appointed his former Leeds teammate Nigel Martyn as goalkeeping coach, a position he kept under McCall. Wetherall returned to concentrate on his playing career after Stuart McCall was named full-time manager during the summer of 2007.

Wetherall holds the UEFA B coaching licence and returned to the Bradford City coaching set up during the summer of 2008. He managed the club's reserves upon his return, and in the summer of 2009, he combined it with the role of youth side management, after Chris Casper left the club. He added he had been put off by senior management because of the day-to-day pressure of the job: "Football is a results-based business first and foremost and that's totally and utterly the case at first-team level." When McCall was sacked as manager, new manager Peter Taylor brought Junior Lewis into the coaching set-up at Bradford, leaving Wetherall to concentrate on his role as youth team manager. After Taylor left the club in February 2011 and Lewis and assistant manager Jacobs were placed on gardening leave, Wetherall acted as assistant to interim manager Peter Jackson. He stayed with Bradford until the end of the season but then left the club to take up a position as head of youth development with the Football League.

In September 2023, he became an academy strategic advisor at Huddersfield Town.

== Personal life ==
Wetherall was inducted into Show Racism The Red Card's hall of fame in December 2007 for his work with their anti-racism campaign. He had become involved with the campaign with former colleague Gunnar Halle while they played at Leeds United. On 30 August 2009, he took part in a charity football match, that included many former Bradford City and Leeds United players, to raise money for Martin House Children's Hospice.

=== Managerial statistics ===
As of 5 February 2008

Team	From	To	Record				
Team	From	To	G	W	L	D	Win %
Bradford City	12 February 2007	22 May 2007	14	2	8	4	14.29

== Honours ==
Leeds United

- Football League Cup runner-up: 1995–96
