= Benito Carbone =

Italian football player and manager (born 1971)

Personal information
- Date of birth: 14 August 1971 (age 55)
- Place of birth: Bagnara Calabra, Italy
- Position: Forward

Team information
- Current team: Inter Milan U20 (head coach)

Youth career
- 1987–1988: Torino

Senior career*
Years	Team	Apps	(Gls)
1988–1994	Torino	35	(3)
1990–1991	→ Reggina (loan)	31	(5)
1991–1992	→ Casertana (loan)	32	(4)
1992–1993	→ Ascoli (loan)	28	(6)
1994–1995	Napoli	29	(4)
1995–1996	Inter Milan	32	(2)
1996–1999	Sheffield Wednesday	96	(25)
1999–2000	Aston Villa	24	(4)
2000–2002	Bradford City	42	(10)
2001	→ Derby County (loan)	13	(1)
2002	→ Middlesbrough (loan)	13	(1)
2002–2003	Como	22	(2)
2003–2004	Parma	19	(4)
2004–2005	Catanzaro	27	(7)
2005–2006	Vicenza	28	(5)
2006	→ Sydney FC (loan)	3	(2)
2007–2010	Pavia	80	(27)
Total		554	(112)

International career
1993–1994	Italy U21	8	(3)

Managerial career
- 2011: Pavia
- 2011: Varese
- 2012–2013: Vallée d'Aoste
- 2015: Pro Sesto
- 2016–2017: Ternana
- 2023: Pavia
- 2024: Emirates
- 2024–: Inter Milan U20
Medal record
Men's football
Representing Italy
UEFA European Under-21 Championship
Winner	1994 France
- * Club domestic league appearances and goals

Benito Carbone (born 14 August 1971) is an Italian football manager and former professional player. Since July 2025, he is the head coach of Inter Milan's under-20 side.

As a player, he was played as a forward, winger or midfielder, notably playing in the Premier League with Sheffield Wednesday, Aston Villa, Bradford City, Derby County and Middlesbrough, and in Serie A for Torino, Napoli, Inter Milan and Parma. He also played for Reggina, Casertana, Ascoli, Como, Catanzaro, Vicenza and Pavia. In 2006, he spent time on loan in the A-League with Sydney FC. He also represented Italy under-21 eight times during his playing career.

== Club career ==
=== Torino ===
Carbone started his career at Torino, who discovered him at a youth tournament while he played for A.S. Scilla Calcio, an amateur youth team of Scilla. He made his debut in Serie A with Torino on 15 January 1989 against Pisa and played a further three games that season. In that season, Torino were relegated to Serie B, and the following season, he played five games in the Italian second division without scoring any goals.

He was sent on loan to Reggina the following season, also in Serie B, where he played 31 games and scored five goals. In the 1991–92 season, always in the lower division, he was loaned to Casertana (31 matches with four goals scored). The following season moved to Ascoli and played a total of 28 games, scoring six goals.

Carbone returned to Turin in the 1993–94 season. He made 28 appearances in the league and scored three goals. In the summer of 1994, he was purchased by Roma, but a few days later was involved in a transfer with Napoli that brought Daniel Fonseca to the Giallorossi. Carbone was valued at 7.5 billion lire. With Napoli, he played 29 games and scored four goals in the league, plus five games and three goals in the UEFA Cup, wearing the number 10 shirt.

Benny Carbone fools his opponents with his feints, but also his team-mates!

— Carbone's Napoli manager Vujadin Boškov on his flair and technical ability.

=== Napoli ===
When Carbone was at Napoli, due to his admiration for the number 10 shirt and also of his idols Diego Maradona and Roberto Baggio, Carbone had specially made shin pads for the rest of his career, which featured a picture of Maradona on the left shin pad, and a picture of Baggio on the right shin pad.

=== Inter Milan ===
In the summer of 1995, Carbone transferred to Inter Milan for 6 billion lire. In Milan, he played 31 games, scoring just two goals. He spent much of the following season, from 1996 to 1997, on the bench under Roy Hodgson.

=== Sheffield Wednesday ===
Carbone signed for English Premier League side Sheffield Wednesday for £3 million in October 1996. At Wednesday, he played alongside his compatriot Paolo Di Canio; Carbone has spoken fondly of playing alongside Di Canio. Carbone became the club's highest goalscorer for the 1998–99 season, scoring nine goals, and was voted the fans' favourite player and player of the season. After a contract dispute with Wednesday at the start of the 1999–2000 season, he was linked with a move away from the club.

=== Aston Villa ===
The 28-year-old Carbone joined Aston Villa for an undisclosed fee and played for a season at Villa Park; his most memorable moment came when he scored a hat-trick against Leeds United in a 3–2 win in the FA Cup, including a spectacular long-range strike from 35 yards; the day before the match, Villa manager John Gregory had refused to let the homesick Italian return to his homeland, insisting he would feel better after scoring against Leeds. This, added to his strikes against Darlington and Everton, meant he contributed five goals in Villa's cup run that season. Carbone started in the FA Cup final alongside strike partner Dion Dublin in a 1–0 loss to Chelsea in the 2000 final, with Chelsea winning the match 1–0 after a goal by Roberto Di Matteo; Carbone nearly scored when his goal-bound shot was cleared off the line by Frank Leboeuf. Carbone earned an FA Cup runners-up medal.

At the start of the 2000–01 season, several clubs, including Fiorentina, Napoli, Perugia, Everton, Coventry City and Bradford City, showed an interest in Carbone's services. Carbone was especially strongly linked with a move to Fiorentina to return to Serie A as a replacement for playmaker Rui Costa, who was linked with leaving the club.

=== Bradford City ===
Bradford City, who had just escaped relegation from the Premiership the previous season, and were aiming to establish themselves in the top flight, made the best offer to Carbone, and he joined the Yorkshire club on a free transfer. The club also signed Stan Collymore to play alongside him. Despite some disillusionment over his wages, Carbone scored some memorable goals and endeared himself to the Valley Parade faithful. Bradford City were relegated and, although he played the start of the following season with them as well as pledging his future to them, he later moved on loan to first Derby County, where he scored once against former club Aston Villa, and then Middlesbrough, where he again scored once in the league against Aston Villa. In 2002, Bradford chairman Geoffrey Richmond informed him that the club would fold if they continued to pay his £40,000-a-week wages. Carbone revealed in later years that he did not want to be known as the man who made Bradford City fold, and he gave up £3.2 million.

=== Later career ===
Carbone left Bradford and returned to Italy with Como and played for Parma from 2003 to 2005. At Parma, Carbone revitalised his career under the leadership of Cesare Prandelli. Parma were in financial trouble and had to sell star players during the season, such as Adrian Mutu, Adriano and Hidetoshi Nakata. During the 2003–04 season, Carbone and Alberto Gilardino became the two main strikers at the club.

After a one-year stint with Vicenza, Carbone signed a four-game guest contract with the Australian team Sydney FC as a potential replacement for Dwight Yorke, who was the club's previous marquee player. He capped his debut against Adelaide United with two assists and a goal. After his debut, many believed he would be better than Yorke, but during his third guest game, he pulled a hamstring muscle that sidelined him for at least seven weeks. Carbone failed to reach an agreement with Sydney for a long-term contract, ending his short-lived career with Sydney. In 2014, Carbone revealed his disappointment in the injury which ended his spell at the club, and he revealed that he would one day like to return to the club as a manager.

Upon returning to Italy, Carbone joined northern side Pavia in August 2007, where he was appointed captain. In his first season back in the lower leagues, Carbone scored five goals in 29 appearances, as Pavia finished fourth from bottom. In total, he scored 31 goals in all competitions for the club, and his goals helped Pavia avoid relegation.

Carbone was often accused of being a mercenary due to his frequent transfers between clubs. He was, however, very popular with the fans of his clubs, particularly at Sheffield Wednesday and Bradford City. He also waived much of the money owed to him—approximately £3.32 million—after he had moved to Como, which helped them survive going into administration in 2002.

== International career ==
Carbone was never capped for Italy at senior level, although he represented the under-18 side in 1989, scoring four goals in seven appearances, and he made eight appearances with the under-21 side between 1989 and 1994, scoring three goals; he was a member of the team that won the 1994 UEFA European Under-21 Championship, notably scoring the decisive penalty in the semi-final shoot-out against hosts France. In total, he made 15 appearances for the Italian youth squads, scoring seven goals.

== Managerial career ==
=== Pavia ===
After his retirement, Carbone accepted to stay at Pavia as youth coach, guiding the Berretti under-19 team. In March 2011, he was then promoted as head coach to replace Gianluca Andrissi. He guided Pavia to a safe place in the 2010–11 Lega Pro Prima Divisione standings, leading the club out of the relegation zone in his two months in charge of the first team. At Pavia, Carbone was given the nickname 'Harry Potter' with Pavia fans believing Carbone had worked 'magic' both as a player and Manager to help them avoid relegation.

=== Varese ===
After impressing as Pavia manager, On 16 June 2011 he was announced as new head coach of Serie B club Varese, replacing local hero Giuseppe Sannino, who left to become new boss of Serie A club Siena, after guiding the club from Lega Pro Seconda Divisione to a spot in the promotion playoffs during his last season in charge. Joining Carbone as part of Carbone's management team at Varese was ex-Inter Milan player Mauro Milanese, who joined the club as Sporting Director.

On 1 October 2011, he was sacked and replaced by Rolando Maran.

=== Saint-Christophe Vallée d'Aoste ===
On 29 October 2012, he was installed as the new coach of Saint-Christophe Vallée d'Aoste in Lega Pro Seconda Divisione in place of the sacked Giovanni Zichella. Saint-Christophe Vallée d'Aoste were bottom of the table before Carbone took charge, and he led them up the table. Carbone eventually resigned as Saint-Christophe Vallée d'Aoste head coach due to restrictions placed upon him.

=== Pursuing a career in England ===
After leaving Saint-Christophe Vallée d'Aoste, Carbone, who was a highly rated young manager, revealed he had turned down three to four job offers to manage in Italy due to his wanting to pursue a management career in England. Carbone had also revealed that current Italy national team manager Cesare Prandelli had endorsed Carbone to become a top manager.

After being linked with the managerial vacancy at Sheffield Wednesday in December 2013, Carbone proclaimed that he wanted to manage the club. On 10 January 2014, Carbone appeared on Sky Sports programme The Fantasy Football Club, presented by his ex-Aston Villa teammate Paul Merson, and revealed that he was still interested in the role. However, the club appointed Stuart Gray (the caretaker manager) as full-time manager on 25 January, after a string of impressive results.

==== Leeds United role ====
In April 2014, Massimo Cellino announced he was giving Carbone the opportunity to help rebuild the academy at Leeds United, and Carbone joined the youth team set up at Thorp Arch as a sporting director.

On 14 May 2014, Carbone announced on his official Twitter page that his job title was "Special Consultant to the board of directors for sport matters, including Facilities & Academy". The club confirmed Carbone's position at the club in a statement on the club's official website on 15 May, they confirmed that Carbone "will be involved with all football matters, including both the first team and the academy." On 11 July, owner Cellino revealed Carbone would also manage Leeds' Under 21 team. Cellino announced Carbone's departure in an August 2014 press interview, citing "family reasons."

On 8 July 2014, Carbone played in a team for his former club Inter Milan vs a Real Madrid Legends team for the 2014 Corazón Classic Match for charity.

=== Pro Sesto ===
On 12 March 2015, he was installed as the new coach of Pro Sesto.

=== Ternana ===
On 14 August 2016, Carbone was appointed manager of Ternana. Hired as a replacement to Christian Panucci, he resigned in January 2017, after a negative string of results that left Ternana in second-to-last place in the league.

=== Crotone ===
On 8 December 2017, Carbone was appointed as assistant manager at Crotone.

=== Later years ===
In 2020, Carbone joined Gianni De Biasi's coaching staff in charge of the Azerbaijan national team. In 2024, he was appointed as assistant manager at Emirates Club. On 27 April 2024, he was installed as the new coach of Emirates Club.

On 1 August 2024, he was unveiled as the new under-18 coach of Inter Milan.

== Style of play ==
Carbone was known primarily for his technical skills, his use of feints, and for his ability to provide assists for team-mates as an offensive playmaker. A versatile forward, although his preferred role was that of a second striker, he was capable of playing in several positions along the front line or in midfield, and was also deployed as a striker, as a winger, and as an attacking midfielder throughout his career. Despite his ability, he was also known to be inconsistent.

== Honours ==
Torino

- Serie B: 1989–90

Aston Villa

- FA Cup runner-up: 1999–2000

Italy U21

- UEFA European Under-21 Championship: 1994
