= Gunnar Halle =

Norwegian footballer and manager (born 1965)

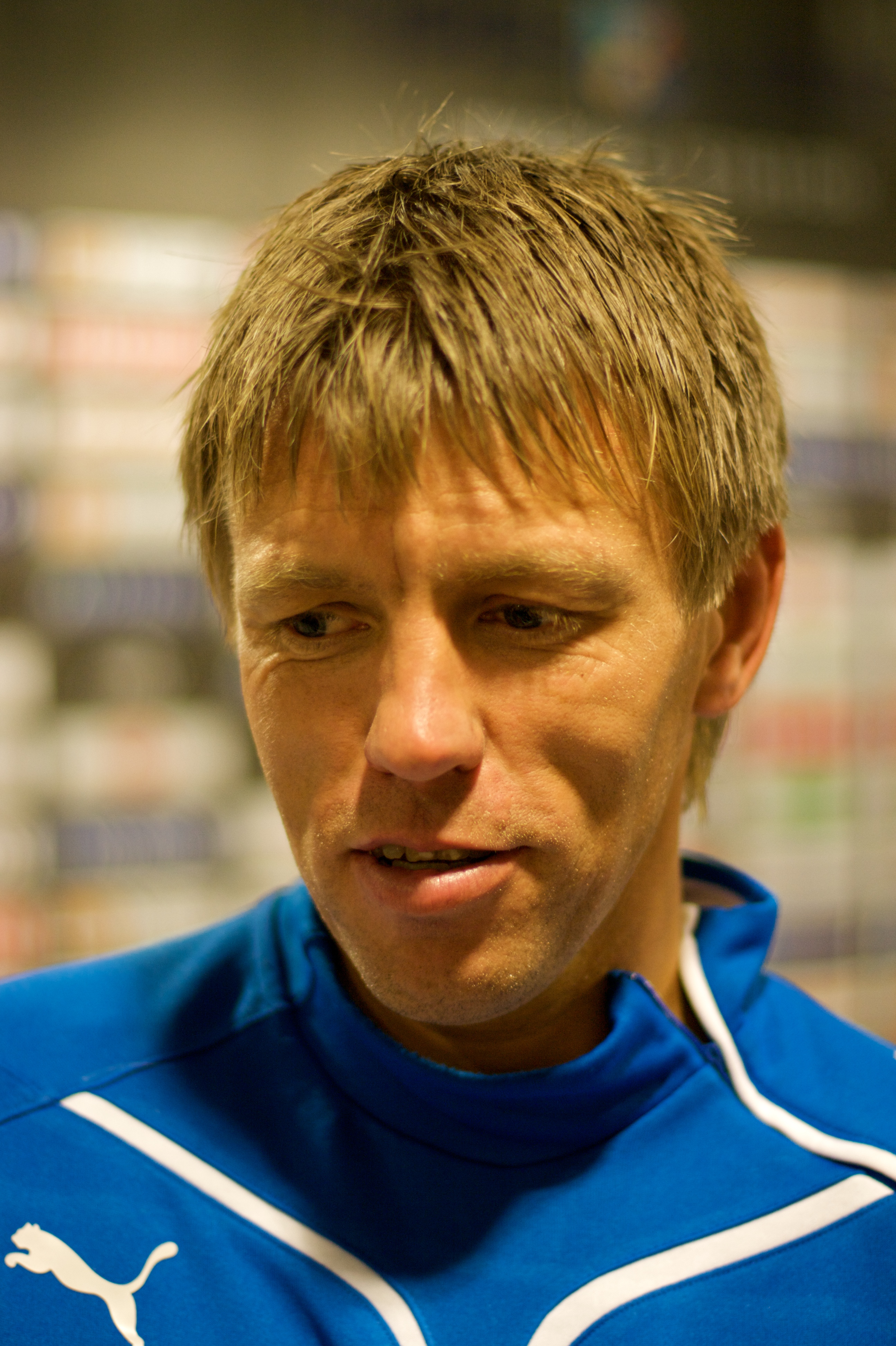
- Halle in 2009

Personal information
- Full name: Gunnar Halle
- Date of birth: 11 August 1965 (age 61)
- Place of birth: Larvik, Norway
- Height: 1.83 m (6 ft 0 in)
- Positions: Right-back; right midfielder

Team information
- Current team: Hønefoss (head coach)

Youth career
- Nesjar
- Larvik Turn

Senior career*
Years	Team	Apps	(Gls)
1985–1990	Lillestrøm	128	(12)
1991–1996	Oldham Athletic	216	(21)
1994	→ Lillestrøm (loan)	3	(1)
1996–1999	Leeds United	85	(4)
1999–2002	Bradford City	93	(2)
2002	Wolverhampton Wanderers	7	(0)
2002–2003	Lillestrøm	43	(6)
Total		565	(46)

International career
1987–1999	Norway	64	(5)

Managerial career
- 2004: Aurskog/Finstadbru (player/coach)
- 2005–2006: Lillestrøm (assistant)
- 2006–2008: Viking (assistant)
- 2009: Lyn (assistant)
- 2009–2010: Lyn
- 2010: Molde (assistant)
- 2012: Norway women (assistant)
- 2013: Strømmen (assistant)
- 2023–: Hønefoss
- * Club domestic league appearances and goals

Gunnar Halle (born 11 August 1965) is a Norwegian football manager and former player who is the current head coach of Hønefoss. A former right back, he is best known for his playing spells at Oldham Athletic and Leeds United, followed by his brief managerial spell at Lyn Oslo.

Halle played professionally in England and for the Norway national team. In total he was capped 64 times and scored five international goals, including a memorable hat-trick against San Marino, and was included in the squads for the 1994 FIFA World Cup and 1998 FIFA World Cup.

== Club career ==
Born in Larvik, Halle started his youth career in local club Nesjar.

Halle started his Norwegian Premier League career in Lillestrøm in 1985 when he joined from Larvik Turn. He quickly became a team regular, and helped win the league titles in 1986 and 1989.

In the spring of 1991 he was sold to Oldham Athletic for £280,000, where he played over 200 matches and is regarded as one of the club's finest players during their Premiership days. He remains Oldham's most capped player, playing 25 times for Norway in his time there.

Halle joined Leeds United for £500,000 in the winter of 1996, where he competed with Gary Kelly for the club's regular right back spot. Halle had a successful time at Leeds under the management of George Graham and latterly David O'Leary. He spent three seasons at the club. In his final season, Halle helped Leeds finish fourth in the Premier League during the 1998–99 season and qualify for the UEFA Cup competition. However, in the summer of 1999, Leeds signed future England right back Danny Mills and Halle joined newly promoted local rivals Bradford City for £200,000.

He spent a further three seasons at Bradford City, scoring twice against Darlington in the League Cup and Portsmouth in the league. A brief spell with Wolverhampton Wanderers concluded his stay in England. He returned to Norway with Lillestrøm in the summer of 2002.

Halle played one and a half seasons for Lillestrøm.

== International career ==
In 1987 Halle made his debut for the Norway national team. He represented Norway in both the 1994 FIFA World Cup and 1998 FIFA World Cup's.

In total he was capped 64 times for Norway and scored five international goals, including a memorable hat-trick against San Marino.

== Coaching career ==
Halle rounding off his playing career and began his coaching career as player-coach for Norwegian Third Division side Aurskog/Finstadbru in the 2004 season.

In the 2005 and 2006 seasons Halle worked as the Lillestrøm assistant coach, but was sacked on 13 November 2006 along with head coach Uwe Rösler. The pair were soon hired to coach Viking.

In December 2008, he moved to Lyn as assistant manager. In August 2009 he stepped up to manager following the termination of Kent Bergersen's contract. The club was relegated to First Division after the 2009 season and changed its name to FK Lyn before the 2010 season. On 30 June 2010, the club declared bankruptcy after several years of financial difficulty, forcing them to forfeit from the league. On 30 August 2010, he was named the new assistant coach of Molde FK, again under Rösler. The duo coached Molde throughout the season.

In February 2012, Halle was named as the new assistant coach of the Norway women's national football team under Eli Landsem. In 2013, he moved to Strømmen IF. Since 2015 he has been manager of various Norwegian FA youth teams from under 15s to under 19s. In December 2022, he was appointed head coach of Hønefoss.

== Honours ==
Lillestrøm SK

- Norwegian Premier League: 1986, 1989
- Norwegian Football Cup: 1985; runner-up: 1986

Oldham Athletic

- Football League Second Division: 1990–91
