= 1997–98 Bradford City A.F.C. season =

Bradford City
1997–98 season
- Chairman: Geoffrey Richmond
- Manager: Chris Kamara (until 6 January); Paul Jewell (from 6 January)
- Stadium: Valley Parade
- First Division: 13th
- FA Cup: Third round
- League Cup: First round
- Top goalscorer: League: Steiner/Edinho (10); All: Steiner/Edinho (11)
- Average home league attendance: 15,564

During the 1997–98 English football season, Bradford City A.F.C. competed in the Football League First Division.

== Season summary ==
In the 1997–98 season, Bradford started well with 13 points from a possible 15 which saw the Bantams top of the table after five games, but results declined and chairman Geoffrey Richmond sacked Kamara on 6 January, three days after a 2–0 FA Cup defeat to Manchester City.

Richmond turned to Jewell, who was by now Kamara's assistant, and he won his first game 2–1 to Stockport County. In his 21 games in charge, Jewell won six games and drew five to guide Bradford to 13th, their highest position since Jewell had joined the club. He was rewarded with a permanent contract when others expected Richmond to turn to a big name.

== Final league table ==
Pos	Team	Pld	W	D	L	GF	GA	GD	Pts
11	Crewe Alexandra	46	18	5	23	58	65	−7	59
12	Oxford United	46	16	10	20	60	64	−4	58
13	Bradford City	46	14	15	17	46	59	−13	57
14	Tranmere Rovers	46	14	14	18	54	57	−3	56
15	Norwich City	46	14	13	19	52	69	−17	55

Source: Statto.com
Rules for classification: 1) Points; 2) Goals scored; 3) Goal difference

== Results ==
Bradford City's score comes first

=== Legend ===
Win	Draw	Loss

=== Football League First Division ===
Date	Opponent	Venue	Result	Attendance	Scorers
9 August 1997	Stockport County	H	2–1	14,312	Edinho, Steiner
15 August 1997	Stoke City	H	0–0	13,823	
23 August 1997	Ipswich Town	H	2–1	13,913	Steiner, Cundy (own goal)
30 August 1997	Reading	A	3–0	7,163	Lawrence, Pepper (2)
2 September 1997	Huddersfield Town	A	2–1	13,159	Edinho, Blake
5 September 1997	Sunderland	H	0–4	16,484	
13 September 1997	Middlesbrough	H	2–2	17,767	Steiner, Edinho
21 September 1997	Charlton Athletic	A	1–4	11,583	Edinho
27 September 1997	Oxford United	A	0–0	6,468	
4 October 1997	Wolverhampton Wanderers	H	2–0	15,236	Steiner, Kulcsar
18 October 1997	Port Vale	A	0–0	7,148	
21 October 1997	Portsmouth	A	1–1	6,827	Edinho
25 October 1997	Crewe Alexandra	H	1–0	15,333	Edinho
1 November 1997	West Bromwich Albion	H	0–0	16,212	
4 November 1997	Birmingham City	A	0–0	14,552	
8 November 1997	Swindon Town	A	0–1	10,029	
15 November 1997	Tranmere Rovers	H	0–1	16,494	
18 November 1997	Sheffield United	H	1–1	16,127	McGinlay
22 November 1997	Manchester City	A	0–1	29,746	
29 November 1997	Norwich City	H	2–1	16,637	Steiner (2)
6 December 1997	Nottingham Forest	A	2–2	17,943	Steiner, Pepper
13 December 1997	Bury	H	1–0	15,812	McGinlay
21 December 1997	Queens Park Rangers	A	0–1	8,853	
26 December 1997	Sunderland	A	0–2	40,055	
28 December 1997	Huddersfield Town	H	1–1	17,842	Blake
10 January 1998	Stockport County	A	2–1	8,460	Jacobs, Blake
16 January 1998	Stoke City	A	1–2	10,459	McGinlay
24 January 1998	Swindon Town	H	1–1	15,130	Edinho
27 January 1998	Reading	H	4–1	13,021	Lawrence, Edinho (2), Blake
31 January 1998	Ipswich Town	A	1–2	11,864	Blake
7 February 1998	Charlton Athletic	H	1–0	14,851	Blake
14 February 1998	Middlesbrough	A	0–1	30,165	
18 February 1998	Wolverhampton Wanderers	A	1–2	21,510	Blake
21 February 1998	Oxford United	H	0–0	14,190	
24 February 1998	Port Vale	H	2–1	13,293	Melville, Pepper
28 February 1998	Sheffield United	A	1–2	17,848	Steiner
7 March 1998	West Bromwich Albion	A	1–1	13,281	Steiner
14 March 1998	Birmingham City	H	0–0	16,392	
21 March 1998	Tranmere Rovers	A	1–3	9,463	Youds
28 March 1998	Manchester City	H	2–1	17,099	Pepper, Edinho
4 April 1998	Norwich City	A	3–2	13,260	Jacobs, Lawrence, Blake (pen)
11 April 1998	Nottingham Forest	H	0–3	17,248	
13 April 1998	Bury	A	0–2	6,570	
19 April 1998	Queens Park Rangers	H	1–1	14,871	Steiner
25 April 1998	Crewe Alexandra	A	0–5	5,054	
3 May 1998	Portsmouth	H	1–3	15,890	Ramage

=== FA Cup ===
Round	Date	Opponent	Venue	Result	Attendance	Goalscorers
R3	3 January 1998	Manchester City	A	0–2	23,686	

=== League Cup ===
Round	Date	Opponent	Venue	Result	Attendance	Goalscorers
R1 First Leg	12 August 1997	Huddersfield Town	A	1–2	8,720	Steiner
R1 Second Leg	26 August 1997	Huddersfield Town	H	1–1 (lost 2–3 on agg)	8,065	Edinho

== Squad ==
Note: Flags indicate national team as defined under FIFA eligibility rules; some limited exceptions apply. Players may hold more than one non-FIFA nationality.

No.	Pos.	Nation	Player
—	GK	(England) ENG	Gary Walsh
—	GK	(England) ENG	Mark Prudhoe
—	GK	(Australia) AUS	Robert Zabica
—	DF	(England) ENG	Chris Wilder
—	DF	(England) ENG	Eddie Youds
—	DF	(England) ENG	Wayne Jacobs
—	DF	(Republic of Ireland) IRL	Andy O'Brien
—	MF	(Jamaica) JAM	Jamie Lawrence
—	MF	(England) ENG	Nigel Pepper
—	MF	(England) ENG	Peter Beagrie
—	MF	(England) ENG	Shaun Murray
—	FW	(Brazil) BRA	Edinho
—	FW	(Sweden) SWE	Robert Steiner
—	MF	(England) ENG	Craig Ramage
—	MF	(England) ENG	Robbie Blake
—	DF	(Jamaica) JAM	Darren Moore
—	DF	(England) ENG	John Dreyer
—	MF	(Australia) AUS	George Kulcsar
—	FW	(Scotland) SCO	John McGinlay

No.	Pos.	Nation	Player
—	DF	(England) ENG	Lee Sinnott (on loan from Oldham Athletic)
—	DF	(Scotland) SCO	Steve McAnespie (on loan from Fulham)
—	DF	(Wales) WAL	Andy Melville (on loan from Sunderland)
—	DF	(England) ENG	John O'Kane (on loan from Manchester United)
—	DF	(England) ENG	Bryan Small
—	MF	(England) ENG	Paul Bolland
—	FW	(Wales) WAL	Lawrence Davies
—	FW	(England) ENG	Gareth Grant
—	DF	(England) ENG	Mark Bower
—	FW	(Norway) NOR	Ole Bjørn Sundgot
—	FW	(Netherlands) NED	Dennis Sepp
—	FW	(England) ENG	Craig Midgley
—	DF	(England) ENG	Danny Verity
—	DF	(England) ENG	Richard Liburd
—	FW	(England) ENG	Gordon Watson
—	DF	(England) ENG	Nicky Mohan
—	DF	(England) ENG	Ian McLean
—	MF	(Scotland) SCO	Andrew Patterson
