= 1996–97 Bradford City A.F.C. season =

Bradford City A.F.C.
1996–97 season
- Chairman: Geoffrey Richmond
- Manager: Chris Kamara
- Stadium: Valley Parade
- First Division: 21st
- FA Cup: Fifth round
- League Cup: First round
- Top goalscorer: League: Ole Sundgot (6); All: Ole Sundgot; Chris Waddle (6)
- Highest home attendance: 17,830 vs Sheffield Wednesday; FA Cup, 16 February 1997
- Lowest home attendance: 3,593 vs Sheffield United; Football League Cup, 3 September 1996
- Average home league attendance: 12,925

During the 1996–97 English football season, Bradford City A.F.C. competed in the Football League First Division.

== Season summary ==
Kamara used 42 players in 1996–97 when Bradford avoided relegation with a 3–0 victory in the final game against Queens Park Rangers.

== Final league table ==
Pos	Team	Pld	W	D	L	GF	GA	GD	Pts	Qualification or relegation
19	Swindon Town	46	15	9	22	52	71	−19	54	
20	Huddersfield Town	46	13	15	18	48	61	−13	54	
21	Bradford City	46	12	12	22	47	72	−25	48	
22	Grimsby Town (R)	46	11	13	22	59	81	−22	46	Relegation to the Second Division
23	Oldham Athletic (R)	46	10	13	23	51	66	−15	43	Relegation to the Second Division

Rules for classification: 1) Points; 2) Goals scored; 3) Goal difference
(R) Relegated

== Results ==
Bradford City's score comes first

=== Legend ===
Win	Draw	Loss

=== Football League First Division ===
Date	Opponent	Venue	Result	Attendance	Scorers
17 August 1996	Portsmouth	H	3–1	10,007	Regtop (pen), Duxbury, Stallard
24 August 1996	Wolverhampton Wanderers	A	0–1	24,171	
28 August 1996	Stoke City	A	0–1	11,918	
31 August 1996	Tranmere Rovers	H	1–0	10,080	Duxbury
7 September 1996	Norwich City	H	0–2	10,054	
10 September 1996	Sheffield United	A	0–3	12,591	
14 September 1996	Oxford United	A	0–2	6,334	
21 September 1996	Bolton Wanderers	H	2–4	12,034	Liburd, Sas
29 September 1996	Port Vale	A	1–1	4,706	Jacobs
2 October 1996	Swindon Town	H	2–1	9,249	Sas (pen), Shutt
5 October 1996	Southend United	H	0–0	10,156	
12 October 1996	Birmingham City	A	0–3	25,157	
16 October 1996	Queens Park Rangers	A	0–1	7,776	
19 October 1996	Barnsley	H	2–2	11,477	Waddle, Kiwomya
26 October 1996	West Bromwich Albion	A	0–0	14,249	
29 October 1996	Crystal Palace	H	0–4	10,091	
2 November 1996	Oldham Athletic	H	0–3	10,855	
8 November 1996	Huddersfield Town	A	3–3	14,126	Waddle, Dreyer, Steiner
16 November 1996	Ipswich Town	H	2–1	10,504	Sundgot (2)
23 November 1996	Charlton Athletic	A	2–0	12,256	Steiner, Waddle
30 November 1996	West Bromwich Albion	H	1–1	12,003	Sas
7 December 1996	Manchester City	A	2–3	25,035	Steiner (2)
17 December 1996	Reading	H	0–0	10,077	
21 December 1996	Grimsby Town	A	1–1	5,766	Duxbury
26 December 1996	Sheffield United	H	1–2	17,475	Jacobs
28 December 1996	Norwich City	A	0–2	13,473	
1 January 1997	Bolton Wanderers	A	1–2	16,192	Shutt
11 January 1997	Oxford United	H	2–0	13,275	O'Brien, Shutt
18 January 1997	Swindon Town	A	1–1	7,851	Jacobs
28 January 1997	Port Vale	H	1–0	15,186	Watson
1 February 1997	Huddersfield Town	H	1–1	17,373	Waddle
8 February 1997	Crystal Palace	A	1–3	14,844	Waddle
22 February 1997	Oldham Athletic	A	2–1	9,524	Sundgot, Edinho
1 March 1997	Manchester City	H	1–3	17,609	Edinho (pen)
4 March 1997	Ipswich Town	A	2–3	9,367	Sundgot (2)
8 March 1997	Grimsby Town	H	3–4	15,219	Sundgot, Edinho, O'Brien
15 March 1997	Reading	A	0–0	8,435	
22 March 1997	Wolverhampton Wanderers	H	2–1	15,351	Edinho, Pepper
29 March 1997	Portsmouth	A	1–3	12,340	Murray
31 March 1997	Stoke City	H	1–0	13,579	Pepper
4 April 1997	Tranmere Rovers	A	0–3	8,531	
12 April 1997	Southend United	A	1–1	6,697	Edinho
19 April 1997	Birmingham City	H	0–2	15,123	
26 April 1997	Barnsley	A	0–2	18,605	
1 May 1997	Charlton Athletic	H	1–0	15,780	Pepper
4 May 1997	Queens Park Rangers	H	3–0	14,723	Pepper (2), Wright

=== FA Cup ===
Round	Date	Opponent	Venue	Result	Attendance	Goalscorers
R3	5 January 1997	Wycombe Wanderers	A	2–0	5,173	Dreyer (2)
R4	25 January 1997	Everton	A	3–2	30,007	Dreyer, Waddle, Steiner
R5	16 February 1997	Sheffield Wednesday	H	0–1	17,830	

=== League Cup ===
Round	Date	Opponent	Venue	Result	Attendance	Goalscorers
R1 First Leg	20 August 1996	Sheffield United	A	0–3	7,575	
R1 Second Leg	3 September 1996	Sheffield United	H	1–2	3,593	Stallard

== First-team squad ==
Note: Flags indicate national team as defined under FIFA eligibility rules; some limited exceptions apply. Players may hold more than one non-FIFA nationality.

No.	Pos.	Nation	Player
—	GK	SCO	Jonathan Gould
—	GK	NIR	Aidan Davison
—	GK	RSA	Paul Evans
—	GK	AUS	Mark Schwarzer
—	DF	ENG	David Brightwell
—	DF	ENG	John Dreyer
—	DF	ENG	Wayne Jacobs
—	DF	ENG	Richard Liburd
—	DF	ENG	Graham Mitchell
—	DF	ENG	Nicky Mohan
—	DF	ENG	Andy O'Brien
—	DF	ENG	Christian Sansam
—	DF	ENG	Chris Wilder
—	DF	NED	Marco Sas
—	DF	POR	Raúl Oliveira (on loan from Farense)
—	MF	ENG	Robbie Blake
—	MF	ENG	Gordon Cowans
—	MF	ENG	Lee Duxbury
—	MF	ENG	Des Hamilton

No.	Pos.	Nation	Player
—	MF	ENG	Richard Huxford
—	MF	ENG	Shaun Murray
—	MF	ENG	Nigel Pepper
—	MF	ENG	Matthew Smithard
—	MF	POR	Sérgio Pinto
—	MF	AUS	George Kulcsar
—	FW	ENG	Andy Kiwomya
—	FW	ENG	Craig Midgley
—	FW	ENG	Ian Ormondroyd
—	FW	ENG	Carl Shutt
—	FW	ENG	Mark Stallard
—	FW	ENG	Chris Waddle
—	FW	ENG	Gordon Watson
—	FW	SCO	Tommy Wright
—	FW	NED	Erik Regtop
—	FW	NOR	Ole Bjørn Sundgot
—	FW	SWE	Robert Steiner
—	FW	FIN	Jari Vanhala
—	FW	BRA	Edinho

=== Left club during season ===
Note: Flags indicate national team as defined under FIFA eligibility rules; some limited exceptions apply. Players may hold more than one non-FIFA nationality.

No.	Pos.	Nation	Player
—	GK	ENG	Eric Nixon (on loan from Tranmere Rovers)
—	GK	ENG	Ben Roberts (on loan from Middlesbrough)
—	MF	SWE	Magnus Pehrsson (on loan from Djurgårdens IF)

No.	Pos.	Nation	Player
—	FW	ENG	Ian Moore (on loan from Tranmere Rovers)
—	FW	ENG	Mike Newell (on loan from Birmingham City)
