= 1998–99 Bradford City A.F.C. season =

Bradford City
1998–99 season
- Chairman: Geoffrey Richmond
- Manager: Paul Jewell
- Stadium: Valley Parade
- First Division: 2nd (promoted)
- FA Cup: Fourth round
- League Cup: Third round
- Top goalscorer: League: Lee Mills (24); All: Lee Mills (25)
- Average home league attendance: 14,298

During the 1998–99 English football season, Bradford City competed in the Football League First Division.

== Season summary ==
In the summer, Jewell signed strikers Lee Mills from Port Vale and Isaiah Rankin from Arsenal, for £1 million and £1.3 million respectively, and signed former captain Stuart McCall from Rangers on a free transfer to lead the side. Despite a poor start, Bradford secured promotion to the top division for the first time in 77 years with a 3–2 victory over Wolverhampton Wanderers in the final game of the 1998-99 season. Bradford's success meant that Dean Windass, who had signed from Oxford United in March, became the club's third £1 million signing of the season: Windass had originally been signed for £950,000, but an additional fee of £50,000 was paid to Oxford because of Bradford's promotion.

== Final league table ==
Pos	Team	Pld	W	D	L	GF	GA	GD	Pts	Qualification or relegation
1	Sunderland (C, P)	46	31	12	3	91	28	+63	105	Promotion to the Premier League
2	Bradford City (P)	46	26	9	11	82	47	+35	87	Promotion to the Premier League
3	Ipswich Town	46	26	8	12	69	32	+37	86	Qualification for the First Division play-offs
4	Birmingham City	46	23	12	11	66	37	+29	81	Qualification for the First Division play-offs
5	Watford (O, P)	46	21	14	11	65	56	+9	77	Qualification for the First Division play-offs

Rules for classification: 1) Points; 2) Goals scored; 3) Goal difference
(C) Champions; (O) Play-off winners; (P) Promoted

== Results ==
Bradford City's score comes first

=== Legend ===
Win	Draw	Loss

=== Results per matchday ===
Matchday	1	2	3	4	5	6	7	8	9	10	11	12	13	14	15	16	17	18	19	20	21	22	23	24	25	26	27	28	29	30	31	32	33	34	35	36	37	38	39	40	41	42	43	44	45	46
Ground	H	A	H	A	A	H	A	H	H	A	H	A	A	H	A	A	H	A	H	A	A	H	A	H	A	H	H	A	H	H	A	H	A	H	H	A	A	H	A	H	A	H	A	A	H	A
Result	L	L	D	L	W	L	D	W	W	W	D	W	L	W	W	D	W	W	L	L	W	W	W	D	W	W	W	W	L	W	D	D	W	W	L	W	W	L	W	W	W	D	L	W	D	W
Position	17	23	19	23	24	22	20	17	15	16	11	14	12	12	13	10	7	10	11	8	7	6	8	6	5	4	2	3	3	3	4	3	3	4	4	3	4	3	3	3	3	3	3	3	2	2

Source: WorldFootball.com
A = Away; H = Home; W = Win; D = Draw; L = Loss

Date	Opponent	Venue	Result	Attendance	Scorers
8 August 1998	Stockport County	H	1–2	14,360	Beagrie (pen)
15 August 1998	Watford	A	0–1	10,731	
23 August 1998	Bolton Wanderers	H	2–2	13,163	Rankin, Mills
28 August 1998	Crewe Alexandra	A	1–2	5,759	McCall
31 August 1998	Birmingham City	H	2–1	13,910	Mills, Moore
8 September 1998	Ipswich Town	A	0–3	11,596	
12 September 1998	Sheffield United	H	2–2	13,169	Mills, Blake
20 September 1998	West Bromwich Albion	A	2–0	12,426	Mills (2)
26 September 1998	Barnsley	H	2–1	15,887	Watson (2)
29 September 1998	Port Vale	H	4–0	13,245	Blake, Moore, Mills (2)
3 October 1998	Sunderland	A	0–0	37,828	
9 October 1998	Bury	H	3–0	15,697	Blake, McCall, Beagrie
17 October 1998	Grimsby Town	A	0–2	20,741	
20 October 1998	Portsmouth	A	4–2	10,062	Whalley, Rankin, Mills, Beagrie
31 October 1998	Bristol City	H	5–0	14,468	Mills, Carey (own goal), Rankin, Beagrie, Blake
7 November 1998	Norwich City	A	2–2	14,722	Rankin, Mills
10 November 1998	Tranmere Rovers	A	1–0	6,002	Beagrie (pen)
14 November 1998	Swindon Town	H	3–0	14,897	Beagrie (pen), Pepper, Jacobs
21 November 1998	Huddersfield Town	A	1–2	18,173	Blake
28 November 1998	Queens Park Rangers	H	0–3	15,037	
5 December 1998	Oxford United	A	1–0	5,969	Mills
12 December 1998	Swindon Town	A	4–1	7,447	Blake (2), Mills (2)
19 December 1998	Wolverhampton Wanderers	H	2–1	13,846	Blake, Mills
26 December 1998	Bolton Wanderers	A	0–0	24,625	
28 December 1998	Tranmere Rovers	H	2–0	14,076	Blake, Mills
9 January 1999	Stockport County	A	2–1	8,975	Blake, Beagrie
16 January 1999	Crewe Alexandra	H	4–1	12,595	Mills (3), Blake
19 January 1999	Crystal Palace	H	2–1	14,368	Westwood, Beagrie (pen)
31 January 1999	Birmingham City	A	1–2	19,291	Lawrence
6 February 1999	Watford	H	2–0	14,142	McCall, Mills
13 February 1999	Ipswich Town	H	0–0	15,024	
19 February 1999	Sheffield United	A	2–2	14,675	Blake (2)
27 February 1999	West Bromwich Albion	H	1–0	14,278	Jacobs
3 March 1999	Barnsley	A	1–0	16,866	Watson
9 March 1999	Sunderland	H	0–1	15,124	
13 March 1999	Norwich City	H	4–1	13,331	Moore, Beagrie (pen), Mills, Lawrence
20 March 1999	Bristol City	A	3–2	10,870	Mills, Jacobs, Whalley
28 March 1999	Crystal Palace	A	0–1	15,626	
3 April 1999	Grimsby Town	H	3–0	14,522	Blake, Sharpe, Beagrie
5 April 1999	Bury	A	2–0	8,000	Bullock (own goal), Windass
10 April 1999	Portsmouth	H	2–1	13,552	Mills, Sharpe
13 April 1999	Port Vale	A	1–1	6,998	Mills
17 April 1999	Huddersfield Town	H	2–3	15,124	Blake, Windass
24 April 1999	Queens Park Rangers	A	3–1	11,641	Beagrie, Westwood, Watson
1 May 1999	Oxford United	H	0–0	15,064	
9 May 1999	Wolverhampton Wanderers	A	3–2	27,589	Beagrie, Mills, Blake

=== FA Cup ===
Round	Date	Opponent	Venue	Result	Attendance	Goalscorers
R3	2 January 1999	Grimsby Town	H	2–1	13,870	Mills, Lawrence
R4	23 January 1999	Newcastle United	A	0–3	36,698	

=== League Cup ===
Round	Date	Opponent	Venue	Result	Attendance	Goalscorers
R1 1st Leg	11 August 1998	Lincoln City	H	1–1	4,481	Beagrie
R1 2nd Leg	18 August 1998	Lincoln City	A	1–0 (won 2–1 on agg)	2,695	Rankin
R2 1st Leg	15 September 1998	Halifax Town	A	2–1	5,714	Moore, Beagrie
R2 2nd Leg	22 September 1998	Halifax Town	H	3–1 (won 5–2 on agg)	6,237	Blake, Beagrie (pen), Pepper
R3	28 October 1998	Leeds United	A	0–1	27,561	

== First-team squad ==
Squad at end of season

Note: Flags indicate national team as defined under FIFA eligibility rules; some limited exceptions apply. Players may hold more than one non-FIFA nationality.

No.	Pos.	Nation	Player
—	GK	ENG	Mark Prudhoe
—	GK	ENG	Gary Walsh
—	DF	ENG	Mark Bower
—	DF	ENG	John Dreyer
—	DF	ENG	Wayne Jacobs
—	DF	ENG	Darren Moore (Note: Moore was born in Birmingham, England, but also qualified to represent Jamaica internationally through his parents and would make his international debut for Jamaica in 2006.)
—	DF	ENG	Lee Todd
—	DF	ENG	Daniel Verity
—	DF	ENG	Ashley Westwood
—	DF	SCO	Stephen Wright
—	DF	IRL	Andy O'Brien (Note: O'Brien was born in Harrogate, England, but also qualified to represent the Republic of Ireland internationally and would make his international debut for the Republic of Ireland in 2001.)
—	MF	ENG	Peter Beagrie
—	MF	ENG	Robbie Blake
—	MF	ENG	Paul Bolland

No.	Pos.	Nation	Player
—	MF	ENG	Jamie Lawrence (Note: Lawrence was born in Wandsworth, England, but also qualified to represent Jamaica internationally and would make his international debut for Jamaica in February 2001.)
—	MF	ENG	Nigel Pepper
—	MF	ENG	Craig Ramage
—	MF	ENG	Lee Sharpe (on loan from Leeds United)
—	MF	SCO	Stuart McCall (captain)
—	MF	IRL	Gareth Whalley (Note: Whalley was born in Manchester, England, but also qualified to represent the Republic of Ireland internationally and has represented them at B level.)
—	FW	ENG	Gareth Grant
—	FW	ENG	Lee Mills
—	FW	ENG	Isaiah Rankin
—	FW	ENG	Gordon Watson
—	FW	ENG	Dean Windass
—	FW	SWE	Robert Steiner
—	FW	BRA	Edinho
