= 1999–2000 Bradford City A.F.C. season =

Bradford City A.F.C.
1999–2000 season
- Chairman: Geoffrey Richmond
- Manager: Paul Jewell
- Stadium: Valley Parade
- FA Premier League: 17th
- FA Cup: Fourth round
- League Cup: Third round
- Top goalscorer: Dean Windass (10)
- Highest home attendance: 18,286 (vs. Newcastle United, 18 December)
- Lowest home attendance: 16,864 (vs. Watford, 22 January)
- Average home league attendance: 18,030
Home colours	Away colours

During the 1999–2000 English football season, Bradford City competed in the FA Premier League.

== Season summary ==
David Wetherall's goal on the final day of the season gave Bradford City a surprise 1–0 victory over Liverpool, which secured survival and kept them in the top division that the Bantams had spent 77 years trying to regain. Paul Jewell then walked out at Valley Parade to take over at relegated Sheffield Wednesday, leaving his assistant Chris Hutchings to pick up the pieces.

== Final league table ==
Pos	Team	Pld	W	D	L	GF	GA	GD	Pts	Qualification or relegation
15	Southampton	38	12	8	18	45	62	−17	44	
16	Derby County	38	9	11	18	44	57	−13	38	
17	Bradford City	38	9	9	20	38	68	−30	36	Qualification for the Intertoto Cup second round
18	Wimbledon (R)	38	7	12	19	46	74	−28	33	Relegation to the Football League First Division
19	Sheffield Wednesday (R)	38	8	7	23	38	70	−32	31	Relegation to the Football League First Division

Source: Premier League
Rules for classification: 1) points; 2) goal difference; 3) number of goals scored.
(R) Relegated

Results summary

Overall								Home						Away					
Pld	W	D	L	GF	GA	GD	Pts	W	D	L	GF	GA	GD	W	D	L	GF	GA	GD
38	9	9	20	38	68	−30	36	6	8	5	26	29	−3	3	1	15	12	39	−27

Source: 1999-2000 FA Premier League table

Results by round

Round	1	2	3	4	5	6	7	8	9	10	11	12	13	14	15	16	17	18	19	20	21	22	23	24	25	26	27	28	29	30	31	32	33	34	35	36	37	38
Ground	A	H	A	A	H	H	A	A	H	A	H	A	H	A	A	H	H	A	H	A	H	A	H	H	A	H	A	H	A	H	A	H	A	H	A	H	A	H
Result	W	D	L	L	L	D	L	W	L	L	W	L	D	L	L	D	W	L	D	L	D	L	W	W	L	D	D	L	L	L	L	L	L	D	W	W	L	W
Position	5	8	13	17	18	18	18	16	18	18	16	18	16	17	17	17	17	17	17	18	18	18	18	18	18	18	18	18	18	18	18	18	19	19	18	17	18	17

Source: 11v11.com: 1999-2000 Bradford City results
A = Away; H = Home; W = Win; D = Draw; L = Loss

== Results ==
Bradford City's score comes first

=== Legend ===
Win	Draw	Loss

=== FA Premier League ===
Date	Opponent	Venue	Result	Attendance	Scorers
7 August 1999	Middlesbrough	A	1-0	33,762	Saunders
14 August 1999	Sheffield Wednesday	H	1-1	18,276	Beagrie (pen)
21 August 1999	Watford	A	0-1	15,564	
25 August 1999	Arsenal	A	0-2	38,073	
28 August 1999	West Ham United	H	0-3	17,926	
12 September 1999	Tottenham Hotspur	H	1-1	18,143	McCall
18 September 1999	Aston Villa	A	0-1	28,083	
25 September 1999	Derby County	A	1-0	31,035	Carbonari (own goal)
2 October 1999	Sunderland	H	0-4	18,204	
16 October 1999	Wimbledon	A	2-3	10,029	Mills, Windass
23 October 1999	Leicester City	H	3-1	17,655	Blake, Mills, Redfearn
1 November 1999	Liverpool	A	1-3	40,483	Windass
6 November 1999	Coventry City	H	1-1	17,587	Mills
20 November 1999	Leeds United	A	1-2	39,937	Windass
28 November 1999	Chelsea	A	0-1	31,591	
4 December 1999	Middlesbrough	H	1-1	17,708	Mills
18 December 1999	Newcastle United	H	2-0	18,286	Saunders, Wetherall
26 December 1999	Manchester United	A	0-4	55,188	
28 December 1999	Everton	H	0-0	18,276	
3 January 2000	Southampton	A	0-1	15,027	
8 January 2000	Chelsea	H	1-1	18,276	Mills
15 January 2000	Sheffield Wednesday	A	0-2	24,682	
22 January 2000	Watford	H	3-2	16,864	Beagrie (pen), Whalley, O'Brien
5 February 2000	Arsenal	H	2-1	18,276	Windass, Saunders
12 February 2000	West Ham United	A	4-5	25,417	Windass, Beagrie (pen), Lawrence (2)
26 February 2000	Aston Villa	H	1-1	18,276	Windass
4 March 2000	Tottenham Hotspur	A	1-1	35,472	Lawrence
12 March 2000	Leeds United	H	1-2	18,276	Beagrie
18 March 2000	Coventry City	A	0-4	19,201	
25 March 2000	Manchester United	H	0-4	18,276	
1 April 2000	Newcastle United	A	0-2	36,572	
8 April 2000	Southampton	H	1-2	17,439	Blake
15 April 2000	Everton	A	0-4	30,646	
21 April 2000	Derby County	H	4-4	18,276	Windass (3), Beagrie (pen)
24 April 2000	Sunderland	A	1-0	40,628	Dreyer
30 April 2000	Wimbledon	H	3-0	18,276	Beagrie (2, 1 pen), Windass
6 May 2000	Leicester City	A	0-3	21,103	
14 May 2000	Liverpool	H	1-0	18,276	Wetherall

=== FA Cup ===
Round	Date	Opponent	Venue	Result	Attendance	Goalscorers
R3	11 December 1999	Crewe Alexandra	A	2-1	6,571	Blake, Saunders
R4	11 January 2000	Gillingham	A	1-3	7,091	Saunders

=== League Cup ===
Round	Date	Opponent	Venue	Result	Attendance	Goalscorers
R2 1st Leg	14 September 1999	Reading	H	1-1	4,961	Blake
R2 2nd Leg	22 September 1999	Reading	A	2-2	6,892 (win on away goals)	Saunders, Wetherall
R3	12 October 1999	Barnsley	H	2-3	8,583	Mills, Wetherall

== First-team squad ==
Squad at end of season

Note: Flags indicate national team as defined under FIFA eligibility rules; some limited exceptions apply. Players may hold more than one non-FIFA nationality.

No.	Pos.	Nation	Player
1	GK	ENG	Gary Walsh
2	DF	SCO	Stephen Wright
3	DF	ENG	Andy Myers
4	MF	SCO	Stuart McCall
5	DF	ENG	David Wetherall (captain)
6	DF	ENG	Ashley Westwood
7	MF	JAM	Jamie Lawrence (Note: Lawrence was born in Wandsworth, England, but also qualified to represent Jamaica internationally and would make his international debut for Jamaica in February 2001.)
8	FW	ENG	Robbie Blake
9	FW	ENG	Lee Mills (on loan to Manchester City)
10	MF	IRL	Gareth Whalley (Note: Whalley was born in Manchester, England, but also qualified to represent the Republic of Ireland internationally and has represented them at B level.)
11	MF	ENG	Peter Beagrie
12	DF	ENG	Lee Todd
13	GK	ENG	Matt Clarke
14	DF	IRL	Andy O'Brien (Note: O'Brien was born in Harrogate, England, but also qualified to represent the Republic of Ireland internationally and would make his international debut for the Republic of Ireland in 2001.)
15	FW	ENG	Dean Windass

No.	Pos.	Nation	Player
16	MF	ENG	Lee Sharpe
18	DF	NOR	Gunnar Halle
19	FW	ENG	Isaiah Rankin
20	DF	ENG	John Dreyer
22	DF	ENG	Wayne Jacobs
23	DF	ENG	Mark Bower
24	FW	ENG	Gareth Grant
25	MF	SCO	Andrew Patterson
27	MF	ENG	Scott Kerr
28	FW	WAL	Dean Saunders
30	GK	ENG	Danny Taylor
31	GK	NIR	Aidan Davison (Note: Davison was born in Sedgefield, England, but also qualified to represent Northern Ireland internationally and made his international debut for Northern Ireland in April 1996.)
32	GK	WAL	Neville Southall
33	FW	POR	Jorge Cadete (on loan from Benfica)
34	GK	NGA	Ademola Bankole (on loan from QPR)

=== Left club during season ===
Note: Flags indicate national team as defined under FIFA eligibility rules; some limited exceptions apply. Players may hold more than one non-FIFA nationality.

No.	Pos.	Nation	Player
17	GK	ENG	Mark Prudhoe (to Southend United)
21	DF	ENG	Darren Moore (Note: Moore was born in Birmingham, England, but also qualified to represent Jamaica internationally through his parents and would make his international debut for Jamaica in 2006.) (to Portsmouth)

No.	Pos.	Nation	Player
26	MF	ENG	Neil Redfearn (to Wigan Athletic)
29	FW	FRA	Bruno Rodriguez (on loan from Paris Saint-Germain)

== Transfers ==
=== In ===
Date	Pos.	Name	From	Fee
11 June 1999	DF	Gunnar Halle	Leeds United	£200,000
15 June 1999	MF	Lee Sharpe	Leeds United	£200,000
22 June 1999	GK	Matt Clarke	Sheffield Wednesday	Free
30 June 1999	DF	David Wetherall	Leeds United	£1,400,000
8 July 1999	DF	Andy Myers	Chelsea	£800,000
31 July 1999	MF	Neil Redfearn	Charlton Athletic	£250,000
5 August 1999	FW	Dean Saunders	Benfica	Free
9 September 1999	FW	Bruno Rodriguez	Paris Saint Germain	Loan
3 February 2000	GK	Neville Southall	Torquay United	Free
14 March 2000	GK	Aidan Davison	Sheffield United	Free
17 February 2000	MF	Jorge Cadete	Benfica	Loan
21 March 2000	GK	Ademola Bankole	Queens Park Rangers	Loan

=== Out ===
Date	Pos.	Name	To	Fee
26 July 1999	FW	Robert Steiner	Queens Park Rangers	£215,000
1 August 1999	MF	Craig Ramage	Notts County	Free
20 August 1999	FW	Gordon Watson	Bournemouth	Free
23 October 1999	FW	Bruno Rodriguez	Paris Saint Germain	Loan return
8 November 1999	GK	Mark Prudhoe	Southend United	Free
17 November 1999	DF	Darren Moore	Portsmouth	£500,000
17 March 2000	MF	Neil Redfearn	Wigan Athletic	£112,500

Transfers in: ▼£2,850,000
Transfers out: ▲£827,500
Total spending: ▼£2,022,500

== Statistics ==
=== Starting 11 ===
Considering starts in all competitions

- GK: #13, (England) Matt Clarke, 24
- RB: #18, (Norway) Gunnar Halle, 40
- CB: #14, (Republic of Ireland) Andy O'Brien, 40
- CB: #5, (England) David Wetherall, 41
- LB: #22, (England) Wayne Jacobs, 23
- RM: #7, (Jamaica) Jamie Lawrence, 20 (#8, (England) Robbie Blake, has 19 starts)
- CM: #4, (Scotland) Stuart McCall, 36
- CM: #10, (Republic of Ireland) Gareth Whalley, 18
- LM: #11, (England) Peter Beagrie, 34
- CF: #28, (Wales) Dean Saunders, 30 (#9, (England) Lee Mills, has 22 starts)
- CF: #15, (England) Dean Windass, 40
