= Gary Walsh =

English footballer (born 1968)

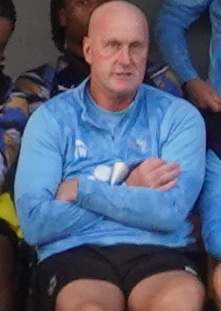
- Walsh at Port Vale (2025)

Personal information
- Full name: Gary Walsh
- Date of birth: 21 March 1968 (age 58)
- Place of birth: Wigan, England
- Height: 6 ft 3 in (1.91 m)
- Position: Goalkeeper

Youth career
- 19??–1984: Wigan Athletic
- 1983–1985: Manchester United

Senior career*
Years	Team	Apps	(Gls)
1985–1995	Manchester United	50	(0)
1988	→ Airdrieonians (loan)	3	(0)
1993–1994	→ Oldham Athletic (loan)	6	(0)
1995–1997	Middlesbrough	44	(0)
1997	→ Bradford City (loan)	5	(0)
1997–2003	Bradford City	126	(0)
2000	→ Middlesbrough (loan)	3	(0)
2003–2006	Wigan Athletic	3	(0)
Total		240	(0)

International career
1987	England U21	2	(0)
- * Club domestic league appearances and goals

Gary Walsh (born 21 March 1968) is an English football coach and former professional player. He played as a goalkeeper in a 21-year professional career, making 281 league and cup appearances. He was also capped twice at England U21 level.

Walsh spent ten years as a backup goalkeeper at Manchester United, where he played 50 First Division and Premier League games. He kept goal in the 1985 FA Youth Cup final and was an unused substitute in the 1991 European Cup Winners' Cup final, 1991 European Super Cup, 1994 FA Charity Shield, 1994 League Cup final, 1994 FA Cup final, and the 1995 FA Cup final. He also had brief loan spells at Airdrieonians and Oldham Athletic. He joined Middlesbrough for £600,000 in August 1995 and played 44 Premier League games before a £500,000 move to Bradford City in 1997. He was named the club's Player of the Year for the 1997–98 season and helped them to win promotion out of the First Division the following campaign. He spent a brief spell in 2000 on loan at Middlesbrough and ended his career in 2006 following three years with Wigan Athletic.

Following his retirement, he moved into coaching. He worked as a goalkeeping coach at Wigan Athletic, Derby County, Hartlepool United, Hull City, Aston Villa and Port Vale.

== Playing career ==
=== Manchester United ===
Born in Wigan, Walsh left school in 1984 and signed for Wigan Athletic as an apprentice. He was originally a striker but was fielded as goalkeeper in a game being watched by a Manchester United scout. He was promptly offered an apprenticeship by Manchester United manager Ron Atkinson, and accepted the offer. He kept goal for United as they finished runners-up to Manchester derby rivals Manchester City in the 1986 FA Youth Cup, though was praised for "keeping the score down" by coach Eric Harrison.

Walsh was given a professional contract for the 1986–87 campaign, during which Ron Atkinson was sacked in favour of Alex Ferguson and made his First Division debut against Aston Villa on 13 December 1986. Clean sheets at home to Leicester City and away to Liverpool followed. He played a total of 14 league games that season. For a short time in the 1987–88 season, a 19-year-old Walsh was made first-choice goalkeeper after Gary Bailey retired due to injury and Chris Turner was dropped from the team. He was named Barclay's Young Eagle of the Month for October. He played in 16 league games before his run in the first-team was halted by a head injury sustained in a mid-season friendly in Bermuda. A succession of further injuries dogged his career for the next six years.

He began the 1988–89 season on loan at Scottish First Division club Airdrieonians, being described as "a real class act" by manager Gordon McQueen after keeping a clean sheet on his debut at Falkirk. He made an "uncharacteristic blunder" to concede in a 1–1 draw with Greenock Morton, though saw out his three-game spell at Broomfield Park with a clean sheet in a 3–0 win over Queen of the South. He next played first-team football at Manchester United in the 1990–91 season, when he played six games. He was an unused substitute in the 1991 European Cup Winners' Cup final win over FC Barcelona at De Kuip. He similarly sat on the bench for the 1991 European Super Cup win over Red Star Belgrade at Old Trafford.

Walsh played six games of the 1991–92 season and featured in two cup games during the 1992–93 campaign. Ferguson tried to find him a new club for the 1993–94 season, but nowhere was willing to take him due to his injury record. He did manage to play six games on loan at Premier League rivals Oldham Athletic. Aberdeen tried to sign him on loan in March but were denied permission by the Scottish Football Association (SFA) as the SFA felt that the club having one fit goalkeeper in Derek Stillie was sufficient not to be deemed as an emergency. This meant he was able to sit on the bench at Wembley for the 1994 League Cup final defeat to Aston Villa, with Les Sealey conceding three goals to Villa. An ankle ligament injury suffered by Peter Schmeichel saw Walsh play the last three Premier League games as United were crowned English champions. Schmeichel did recover in time to play the 1994 FA Cup final, leaving Walsh to sit on the bench and then lift the trophy with his teammates following a 4–0 win over Chelsea.

He was an unused substitute in the 1994 FA Charity Shield, when he picked up another winner's medal as United beat Blackburn Rovers 2–0. He made a total of 16 appearances in the 1994–95 season. United reached the 1995 FA Cup final, though this time Walsh picked up a runners-up medal as Everton won the match 1–0.

=== Middlesbrough ===
Walsh moved to Middlesbrough, managed by his former teammate Bryan Robson, for £600,000 in August 1995. In the 1996–97 League Cup campaign, Walsh played in the quarter-final victory over Liverpool, but was not selected in the final squad against Leicester City, who beat Middlesbrough in a replay. In the FA Cup run he played in the opening game of the campaign against Chester City, but would not feature in the tournament again as his teammates went on to lose the final 2–0 to Chelsea.

=== Bradford City ===
Walsh signed for Bradford City on loan in October 1997, before manager Chris Kamara paid a £500,000 fee to make the transfer permanent. He was named as the club's Player of the Year for the 1997–98 season. He was an ever-present in goal and in terrific form throughout as Bradford won automatic promotion to the Premier League at the end of the 1998–99 season. He remained first-choice in the Premier League until he suffered an injury that was operated on in November 1999, which ruled him out for the remainder of the 1999–2000 season. He then battled with Matt Clarke for a first-team place and was voted as the Players' Player of the Year for the 2000–01 relegation season by his teammates. He rejoined his former club Middlesbrough on a one-month loan in September 2000 after Mark Schwarzer, Marlon Beresford, Mark Crossley and Brad Jones were all sidelined due to injury or illness. However, he struggled with injuries at Valley Parade and the administration afflicted club were unable to justify his high wages any longer, so he was released by Bradford manager Nicky Law at the end of the 2002–03 season.

=== Wigan Athletic ===
In July 2003, he joined Wigan Athletic as the backup to John Filan. He was Filan's backup for three years before he retired in 2006.

== Coaching career ==
Walsh transitioned from goalkeeper to goalkeeping coach at Wigan Athletic, before he was taken to Derby County by former Wigan manager Paul Jewell in January 2008. Upon hearing of the move, Wigan boss Steve Bruce said: "Gary has conducted himself very professionally throughout my short stay here and has behaved with integrity". Following Jewell's departure from Derby, Walsh left in June 2009 and was subsequently appointed goalkeeping coach at Hartlepool United. He was praised by new goalkeeper Jake Kean in September 2010 for helping him to settle at the club. In December 2011, Walsh was recruited by his former Middlesbrough teammate Nick Barmby to take over as goalkeeping coach at Hull City. In November 2016, Walsh left Hull City and joined Steve Bruce at Aston Villa as goalkeeping coach. On 3 October 2018, head coach Steve Bruce and his entire coaching staff, including Walsh, were fired by the club. Walsh was recruited by West Bromwich Albion manager Darren Moore in January 2019, in a move that reunited him not only with former Bradford teammate Moore, but also former Villa goalkeeper Sam Johnstone. He stayed with the club for five years, leaving The Hawthorns after being fired by Carlos Corberán in July 2023. He joined Darren Moore at Port Vale in February 2024.

== Career statistics ==
Appearances and goals by club, season and competition
Club	Season	League			FA Cup		League Cup		Other		Total	
Club	Season	Division	Apps	Goals	Apps	Goals	Apps	Goals	Apps	Goals	Apps	Goals
Manchester United	1986–87	First Division	14	0	0	0	0	0	—		14	0
Manchester United	1987–88	First Division	16	0	0	0	2	0	—		18	0
Manchester United	1988–89	First Division	0	0	0	0	0	0	—		0	0
Manchester United	1989–90	First Division	0	0	0	0	0	0	—		0	0
Manchester United	1990–91	First Division	5	0	0	0	0	0	1 (Note: Appearance(s) in the European Cup Winners' Cup)	0	6	0
Manchester United	1991–92	First Division	2	0	0	0	1	0	1	0	4	0
Manchester United	1992–93	Premier League	0	0	0	0	1	0	1 (Note: Appearance(s) in the UEFA Cup)	0	2	0
Manchester United	1993–94	Premier League	3	0	0	0	0	0	0	0	3	0
Manchester United	1994–95	Premier League	10	0	0	0	3	0	3 (Note: Appearance(s) in the UEFA Champions League)	0	16	0
Manchester United	Total		50	0	0	0	7	0	6	0	63	0
Airdrieonians (loan)	1988–89	Scottish First Division	3	0	—		—		—		3	0
Oldham Athletic (loan)	1993–94	Premier League	6	0	0	0	0	0	—		6	0
Middlesbrough	1995–96	Premier League	32	0	3	0	6	0	—		41	0
Middlesbrough	1996–97	Premier League	12	0	1	0	3	0	—		16	0
Middlesbrough	Total		44	0	4	0	9	0	0	0	57	0
Bradford City	1997–98	First Division	34	0	1	0	—		—		35	0
Bradford City	1998–99	First Division	46	0	2	0	5	0	—		53	0
Bradford City	1999–2000	Premier League	11	0	0	0	2	0	—		13	0
Bradford City	2000–01	Premier League	19	0	1	0	0	0	1 (Note: Appearance(s) in the UEFA Intertoto Cup)	0	21	0
Bradford City	2001–02	First Division	18	0	0	0	0	0	—		18	0
Bradford City	2002–03	First Division	3	0	0	0	0	0	—		3	0
Bradford City	Total		131	0	4	0	7	0	1	0	143	0
Middlesbrough (loan)	2000–01	Premier League	3	0	0	0	0	0	—		3	0
Wigan Athletic	2003–04	First Division	3	0	0	0	2	0	—		5	0
Wigan Athletic	2004–05	First Division	0	0	0	0	1	0	—		1	0
Wigan Athletic	2005–06	Premier League	0	0	0	0	0	0	—		0	0
Wigan Athletic	Total		3	0	0	0	3	0	0	0	6	0
Career total			240	0	8	0	26	0	7	0	281	0

== Honours ==
Manchester United Youth

- FA Youth Cup runner-up: 1985–86

Manchester United

- FA Cup: 1993–94; runner-up: 1994–95
- FA Charity Shield: 1994
- European Cup Winners' Cup: 1990–91
- European Super Cup: 1991
- Football League Cup runner-up: 1993–94

Bradford City

- Football League First Division second-place promotion: 1998–99

Individual

- Bradford City Player of the Year: 1997–98
