= Robbie Blake =

English footballer (born 1976)

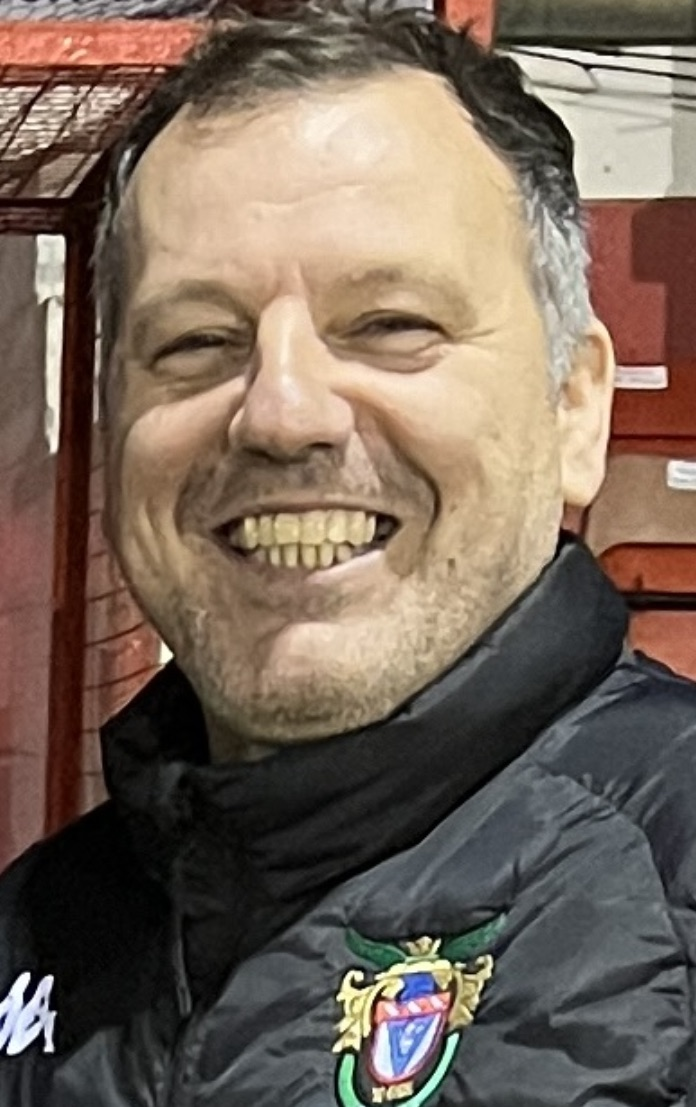
- Robbie Blake as manager of Bognor Regis Town in January 2024

Personal information
- Full name: Robert James Blake
- Date of birth: 4 March 1976 (age 50)
- Place of birth: Middlesbrough, England
- Height: 5 ft 9 in (1.75 m)
- Positions: Striker; midfielder

Youth career
- –1994: Darlington

Senior career*
Years	Team	Apps	(Gls)
1994–1997	Darlington	68	(21)
1995–1996	→ Waterford United (loan)	2	(0)
1997–2002	Bradford City	153	(40)
2000	→ Nottingham Forest (loan)	11	(1)
2002–2005	Burnley	120	(42)
2005	Birmingham City	11	(2)
2005–2007	Leeds United	77	(19)
2007–2010	Burnley	122	(19)
2010–2012	Bolton Wanderers	9	(1)
2012–2013	Doncaster Rovers	7	(0)
2013	Team Northumbria		
Total		580	(145)

Managerial career
- 2018–2024: Bognor Regis Town
- 2026: Eastbourne Borough (caretaker)
- * Club domestic league appearances and goals

Robert James Blake (born 4 March 1976) is an English former professional footballer who is a first-team coach at National League South club Eastbourne Borough. He began his career as a striker but was increasingly used as midfielder in the latter part of his career.

He began his professional career with Darlington in 1994 and went on to make more than 500 appearances in the Football League and Premier League playing for Bradford City, Nottingham Forest, Burnley, Birmingham City, Leeds United, Bolton Wanderers and Doncaster Rovers. Blake was the subject of many transfers throughout his career, with career total transfer fees reaching £3.6 million.

== Playing career ==
=== Darlington ===
Born in Middlesbrough, England, Blake began his professional football career at Division Three side Darlington in the 1994–95 season after signing on from the youth academy. He spent the first few seasons of his career playing at Feethams, and also was loaned out to Waterford United during the 1995–96 season, making some 68 league appearances and scoring 21 goals before the club received an offer, from then Division One side, Bradford City in March 1997. Bradford made a £300,000 offer for the player which Darlington accepted.

=== Bradford City ===
Blake quickly settled into the Bradford side and he scored eight goals in his first full season, first under Chris Kamara and then Paul Jewell. He was sent off in the final game of the 1997–98 season against Portsmouth meaning he was suspended for the start of the following season. But he forced his way back into the team and scored in his first game back in a 2–2 draw with Sheffield United. He and new signing Lee Mills forged a lethal partnership in attack sharing 40 goals. Blake scored 16 goals as City won promotion to the Premiership. Blake scored the winning goal in the final game against Wolverhampton Wanderers of the 1998–99 season to see his side finish the season as league runners-up.

However the following season was harder for Blake and he struggled to make an impact in the Premiership, starting just 15 games for Bradford, with a further 12 played as a substitute. The next season at Valley Parade began much differently for Blake after being sent on loan to Division One side Nottingham Forest for two months, scoring once against Barnsley. Following his 2-month loan spell at Forest he returned to Bradford where he finished the season with four goals from his 14 starts in the 2000–01 season with Bradford ultimately being relegated to Division One. During the summer of 2001 former loan club Nottingham Forest made an undisclosed bid for the player which was rejected. Following the failed transfer bid Forest manager David Platt said;

"The offer was turned down, and as no further finance is available, we must assume the deal is dead" – David Platt

This was not the last transfer offer Bradford would receive as just a few months later on 25 January 2002 the club received a £1 million transfer bid from fellow Division One side Burnley and, due to Bradford's poor financial status, the club had no option but to sell the player.

=== Burnley ===
Blake signed a three-year contract with the Clarets but did not feature much in the remaining six months of the season due to a hernia injury. In his second season at Burnley Blake was the club's top scorer with 22 goals in all competitions from 46 games. That summer, long time Burnley manager Stan Ternent left the club and was replaced by Steve Cotterill and under the new manager Blake continued his prolific goal scoring with 13 goals in the run up to the January transfer window. When the transfer window opened Blake was subject of multiple bids by Premiership clubs, all of which were rejected (at first). Several bids were made by Wigan Athletic who had offers of £500,000 and £600,000 rejected. Following the failed bids Wigan manager Paul Jewell said;

"The position is that we made an offer for him and it's been turned down, it's as simple as that" – Paul Jewell

Wigan later made a third for the player, a revised figure of £700,000. Again the Burnley board turned down this offer and no further bids were made by the Latics. In his final game of his first spell at Burnley he scored what is possibly the best goal of his Burnley career leathering in a stunning free kick from 35 yards in a local derby against Preston North End. Eventually a successful bid of £1.25 million was made by Birmingham City and Blake once again had a chance to prove himself in the top league.

=== Birmingham City ===
Blake made his debut for Birmingham in the FA Cup against Leeds United on 8 January 2005 as a second-half substitute. Blake was confident that he could push for a starting place at Birmingham saying:

"Clinton Morrison and Emile Heskey have done fantastically well, but hopefully I can push them for a place. I can play in a few positions, behind the strikers or dropping deep, and that gives the gaffer some selections to think about. I thought if anything a bottom four team in the Premiership would come in for me but Birmingham, with the quality of players they have, was an even bigger bonus." – Robbie Blake

In an interview with BBC Sport. Blake's hopes did not materialise, he went on to play just 11 games for the club and only scored two goals. During the summer of that year Birmingham confirmed that they had received an offer from Leeds United for Blake:

"We have had an offer from Leeds for Robbie Blake. We are considering it and talks are ongoing. Robbie has done very well for us, but he feels he wants to play more and at Leeds he would probably play every week" – Steve Bruce

Blake did not travel with his teammates on the pre-season tour as he was still in negotiations with Leeds and he was eventually signed for £800,000.

=== Leeds United ===
Blake signed a three-year deal at Elland Road and commented that although moving to Leeds was stepping back a division he was looking forward to winning promotion with his new club;

"It's a step back in terms of divisions but hopefully I can get back into the Premier League with Leeds. With the quality of players we have got, I'm sure there will be no end of goals going in." – Robbie Blake

He made his debut for the club alongside Northern Ireland striker David Healy in the first match of the 2005–06 season against Millwall and scored his first goal just two days later in the Championship match against Cardiff City at Ninian Park. He went on to make 31 starts for Leeds and finished the season with 11 goals.

Blake was one of six strikers at Leeds and was not a first team regular until the second season when Dennis Wise was appointed manager following Kevin Blackwell's departure. Blake did manage eight goals in the 2006–07 season but this was not enough to save Leeds from relegation after the club filed for administration and suffered a 10-point deduction. Following their relegation to the Football League One Leeds struggled to hang on to their players with the likes of David Healy, Richard Cresswell, Neil Sullivan and Kevin Nicholls all leaving the club.

Blake soon followed when he was re-signed by Burnley for a fee of £250,000 on 13 July 2007 and signed a three-year deal. A number of clauses on the sale meant the total transfer fee would rise to £350,000 after 40 games and also included a further payment if Burnley were to be promoted.

=== Return to Burnley ===
With Blake back at his old club, manager Steve Cotterill revealed that Blake felt he had "unfinished business" with the club and that the player needed no persuasion to sign the deal. Burnley director Brendan Flood also revealed that Burnley had been working on a deal for a couple of weeks prior to the announcement:

"With strikers, once it gets mooted that they may be on the move, it invites others to join the hunt. Being able to keep it under wraps is therefore vital, otherwise you get competitive bids coming and the price spirals. Robbie is a proven entertainer and one of the top strikers in the Championship and we know he is always going to score goals. But the really important factor is that he is happy and keen to play for Burnley." – Brendan Flood

Blake made his return debut for the club on 11 August 2007 in the opening fixture of the 2007–08 Football League Championship season against West Bromwich Albion which Burnley won 2–1. He then scored the first goal of his second spell with the Clarets against in the League Cup game against Oldham Athletic. He was heavily praised by both his and other managers as well as the press for his excellent form at the start of the 2007–2008 season, most notably for his performance in the 1–1 draw against Crystal Palace just days after the birth of his daughter Mia. Blake finished the season with 10 goals and 14 assists in 43 matches.

Blake came close to helping Burnley into the 2009 League Cup final by scoring one goal and making two more in the second leg of the side's semi-final against Tottenham Hotspur. The goals put Burnley just two minutes away from the final, before Tottenham scored twice in the final two minutes to reach the final on aggregate.

Blake returned to the top flight once again in May 2009, this time with Burnley after Burnley beat Sheffield United 1–0 in the play-off final at Wembley. A match which Blake played in, directly against a young Kyle Walker. Blake scored his first Premier League goal since 2005 on 19 August 2009 against the defending Premier League champions Manchester United, in a 1–0 win. This was Burnley's first home game in the top flight of English football for 33 years.

=== Bolton Wanderers ===
On 30 June 2010, it was announced that he had signed for Bolton Wanderers on a free transfer and would officially join the club a day later. He made his debut for Wanderers in their 3–1 win over West Ham United at Upton Park on 21 August and scored his first goal for the club eight days later in the home game against former employers Birmingham City with a free kick that earned Bolton a 2–2 draw. As the season drew on, Blake became less and less involved in the first team and several clubs showed interest in signing him on loan, but the player decided to stay and fight for his first team place. At the end of the season, the club decided to take up the option on extending his contract for another year. However, at the end of the following season, following Bolton's relegation from the Premier League, Blake was released. He made only three appearances in his second season with only one of them in the league, on the opening day of the season.

=== Doncaster Rovers ===
On 27 June 2012, it was announced that Blake had signed a one-year deal for Doncaster Rovers on a free transfer. After two League Cup starts and several appearances from the bench, he scored his first goal for Rovers on 1 December 2012 in an FA Cup game at Oldham Athletic. With no appearances since January, Blake's contract was terminated by mutual consent on 25 March 2013, with him having scored once in 14 appearances for the club.

=== Team Northumbria ===
On 2 November 2013, it was announced that Blake had signed for Team Northumbria who are in the Division One of the Northern League on a free transfer.

== Coaching career ==
In September 2015, Blake joined the backroom staff at Portsmouth as a coach.

On 23 May 2018, it was announced that Blake had joined Bognor Regis Town as First Team Coach. He departed the club by mutual consent in November 2024 with the club sitting bottom of the Isthmian League Premier Division.

Blake has joined the coaching staff at Weymouth FC for the 2025/26 season.

On 20 February 2026, Blake was made caretaker manager of National League South club Eastbourne Borough following the departure of Tommy Widdrington, where Blake had been acting as first-team coach.

== Career statistics ==
Appearances and goals by club, season and competition
Club	Season	League			FA Cup		League Cup		Other		Total	
Club	Season	Division	Apps	Goals	Apps	Goals	Apps	Goals	Apps	Goals	Apps	Goals
Darlington	1994–95	Third Division	9	0	0	0	0	0	0	0	9	0
Darlington	1995–96	Third Division	29	11	2	0	2	0	3 (Note: Appearances in Third Division play-offs)	1	36	12
Darlington	1996–97	Third Division	30	10	2	0	4	1	1 (Note: Appearances in Football League Trophy)	0	37	11
Darlington	Total		68	21	4	0	6	1	4	1	82	23
Bradford City	1996–97	First Division	5	0	—		—		—		5	0
Bradford City	1997–98	First Division	34	8	1	0	2	0	—		37	8
Bradford City	1998–99	First Division	39	16	2	0	3	1	—		44	17
Bradford City	1999–2000	Premier League	28	2	2	1	3	1	—		33	4
Bradford City	2000–01	Premier League	21	4	1	0	—		4 (Note: Appearances in UEFA Intertoto Cup)	2	26	6
Bradford City	2001–02	First Division	26	10	1	0	3	2	—		30	12
Bradford City	Total		153	40	7	1	11	4	4	2	175	47
Nottingham Forest (loan)	2000–01	First Division	11	1	—		1	0	—		12	1
Burnley	2001–02	First Division	10	0	—		—		—		10	0
Burnley	2002–03	First Division	41	13	4	2	4	1	—		49	16
Burnley	2003–04	First Division	45	19	3	2	3	1	—		51	22
Burnley	2004–05	Championship	24	10	—		4	3	—		28	13
Burnley	Total		120	42	7	4	11	5	—		138	51
Birmingham City	2004–05	Premier League	11	2	2	0	—		—		13	2
Leeds United	2005–06	Championship	41	11	2	0	2	0	2 (Note: Appearances in Championship play-offs)	0	47	11
Leeds United	2006–07	Championship	36	8	1	0	3	1	—		40	9
Leeds United	Total		77	19	3	0	5	1	2	0	87	20
Burnley	2007–08	Championship	45	9	1	0	3	1	—		49	10
Burnley	2008–09	Championship	46	8	5	0	7	1	3	0	61	9
Burnley	2009–10	Premier League	31	2	2	0	1	0	—		34	2
Burnley	Total		122	19	8	0	11	2	3	0	144	21
Bolton Wanderers	2010–11	Premier League	8	1	2	0	2	0	—		12	1
Bolton Wanderers	2011–12	Premier League	1	0	0	0	2	0	—		3	0
Bolton Wanderers	Total		9	1	2	0	4	0	—		15	1
Doncaster Rovers	2012–13	League One	7	0	2	1	3	0	2	0	14	1
Career total			578	145	35	6	52	13	15	3	680	167

== Honours ==
=== As a player ===
Bradford City

- Football League First Division second-place promotion: 1998–99

Burnley

- Football League Championship play-offs: 2009

=== As a manager ===
Bognor Regis Town

- Sussex Senior Challenge Cup runner-up: 2022–23
