= Robert Steiner (footballer) =

Swedish footballer

Personal information
- Full name: Robert Herman Steiner
- Date of birth: 20 June 1973 (age 53)
- Place of birth: Finspång, Sweden
- Height: 6 ft 2 in (1.88 m)
- Position: Striker

Senior career*
Years	Team	Apps	(Gls)
1992–1997	IFK Norrköping	16	(2)
1996–1997	→ Bradford City (loan)	16	(3)
1997–1999	Bradford City	37	(10)
1998	→ Queens Park Rangers (loan)	8	(1)
1999	→ Queens Park Rangers (loan)	4	(2)
1999	→ Walsall (loan)	10	(3)
1999–2000	Queens Park Rangers	24	(6)
Total		115	(27)

International career
1997	Sweden	3	(1)
- * Club domestic league appearances and goals

Robert Herman Steiner (born 20 June 1973) is a Swedish former professional footballer who played as a striker. He represented IFK Norrköping, Bradford City, Queens Park Rangers, and Walsall during a career that spanned between 1992 and 2000. He won three caps and scored one goal for the Sweden national team in 1997.

== Career ==
Steiner started out playing football in his homeland with IFK Norrköping. He moved to England in 1996, originally on loan to Bradford City when manager Chris Kamara signed Steiner, fellow Swede Magnus Pehrsson and Norwegian striker Ole Bjørn Sundgot. Steiner was the most successful of the three after scoring three league goals during his loan spell, and more famously one of the three goals in the 3–2 FA Cup triumph over Everton. Steiner's form earned him a call-up to the national side. He won three caps and scored one goal.

Kamara bought the Swede for £500,000 the following summer. In his first and only full season at Valley Parade he forged a deadly partnership with Brazilian Edinho. The pair each scored ten goals and were the club's leading goalscorers during 1997–98. The following summer new manager Paul Jewell was given cash to spend by chairman Geoffrey Richmond and Steiner fell out of favour. He played just one League Cup game in 1998–99 in a 1–1 draw with Lincoln City.

Steiner was loaned out twice to Queens Park Rangers and once to Walsall before he was signed permanently by QPR for £215,000. However, after just 24 games and six goals Steiner was forced to retire due to a serious knee injury at just 27 years of age in November 2000.

== Career statistics ==
=== International ===
Appearances and goals by national team and year
National team	Year	Apps	Goals
Sweden	1997	3	1
Total		3	1

Scores and results list Sweden's goal tally first, score column indicates score after each Steiner goal.

List of international goals scored by Robert Steiner
No.	Date	Venue	Opponent	Score	Result	Competition	Ref.
1	16 January 1997	National Stadium, Bangkok, Thailand	Thailand	3–1	3–1	1997 King's Cup	

== Honours ==
Sweden

- King's Cup: 1997
