= Raúl Oliveira =

Portuguese footballer

Personal information
- Full name: Raúl Miguel Silva Fonseca Castanheira de Oliveira
- Date of birth: 26 August 1972 (age 54)
- Place of birth: Lisbon, Portugal
- Height: 1.90 m (6 ft 3 in)
- Position: Centre-back

Youth career
- 1984–1991: Amora

Senior career*
Years	Team	Apps	(Gls)
1991–1995	Amora	86	(4)
1995–1996	Belenenses	9	(0)
1996–1997	Farense	13	(0)
1997	Bradford City	2	(0)
1997–2002	Estrela Amadora	140	(4)
2002–2004	Académica	22	(1)
2005–2007	Lusitânia	46	(2)
Total		318	(11)
- * Club domestic league appearances and goals

Raúl Miguel Silva Fonseca Castanheira de Oliveira (born 26 August 1972) is a Portuguese retired footballer who played as a central defender.

== Club career ==
Born in Lisbon, Oliveira played for six clubs in his native country: Amora FC, C.F. Os Belenenses, S.C. Farense, C.F. Estrela da Amadora – his biggest success, spending four consecutive seasons in the Primeira Liga, almost always as a starter– Académica de Coimbra and S.C. Lusitânia, retiring in 2008 at the age of 35.

Oliveira started an abroad stint in England with Bradford City in early 1997, appearing in only two Division One games during the campaign for Chris Kamara's team and subsequently resuming his career in Portugal.
