= Chris Kamara's Street Soccer =

2000 video game by Pixel Storm

- Developer: Pixel Storm
- Publisher: Midas Interactive Entertainment
- Platform: PlayStation
- Release: PAL: August 25, 2000
- Genre: Sports
- Modes: Single-player, multiplayer

Chris Kamara's Street Soccer is a video game released for the PlayStation in 2000. It was developed by Italian company Pixel Storm and published by Midas Interactive Entertainment. The game is endorsed by former footballer, manager and pundit Chris Kamara, who appears on the game's cover. The game was marketed as a "pocket price" budget title, retailing at £7.99 at release, alongside other Midas Interactive Entertainment published titles such as King of Bowling 2, Goldie, Sanvein and Sports Superbike.

Players choose from 25 teams to compete in five-a-side street soccer. 20 are available from the start and 5 can be unlocked. The teams represent cities from different countries around the world, such as London and Paris. Arenas are set in eight locations including Death Valley, temple, castle, skyscraper, Easter Island, the Colosseum, Stonehenge and Volcano. The game incorrectly lists Prague as from Norway rather than Czech Republic. Some of the teams consist of female players. Despite the title bearing his name Chris Kamara does not actually feature as a player in the game, but provides commentary on the gameplay.

The game can be played in either Exhibition, Arcade, Time Attack, League, Cup and Penalty Shootout mode. The game allows up to 8 players to play via the Multitap accessory.

Writing in Official PlayStation Magazine Andy Lowe awarded the title a score of 6/10, describing it as "low on production values, but high on pure gameplay".
