= Andy O'Brien (footballer) =

Footballer (born 1979)

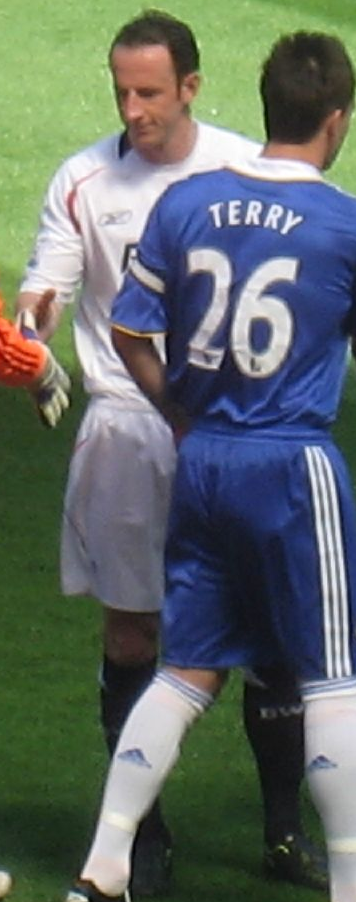
- O'Brien in 2008

Personal information
- Full name: Andrew James O'Brien
- Date of birth: 29 June 1979 (age 47)
- Place of birth: Harrogate, England
- Height: 1.91 m (6 ft 3 in)
- Position: Centre-back

Youth career
- –1994: Leeds United
- 1994–1996: Bradford City

Senior career*
Years	Team	Apps	(Gls)
1996–2001	Bradford City	133	(3)
2001–2005	Newcastle United	120	(6)
2005–2007	Portsmouth	32	(0)
2007–2011	Bolton Wanderers	74	(1)
2010–2011	→ Leeds United (loan)	11	(1)
2011–2012	Leeds United	23	(1)
2012–2014	Vancouver Whitecaps FC	50	(0)
Total		443	(12)

International career
	England U18	1	(0)
1999	Republic of Ireland U21	8	(0)
2001–2006	Republic of Ireland	26	(1)
- * Club domestic league appearances and goals

Andrew James O'Brien (born 29 June 1979) is a former professional footballer who played as a centre-back. Born in England, he won 26 caps for Republic of Ireland between 2001 and 2006 and was a member of the Republic's 2002 World Cup squad. He retired from international duty in 2006.

== Club career ==
=== Bradford City ===
Born in Harrogate, England, O'Brien began his footballing career at St John Fisher Catholic High School, Harrogate, under the stewardship of his manager, Max Mills. He joined Leeds United's academy and played in the same youth side as Harry Kewell and Jonathan Woodgate, however O'Brien was released by Leeds at the age of 14. His talent as a defender was spotted by Bradford City and joined their junior ranks in 1994. He made his senior debut in October 1996 against Queens Park Rangers. He soon became a regular in the Bradford City first team, and helped the Bantams to promotion to the FA Premier League during the 1998–99 season.

He was a regular in the Bradford City side during its two years in the Premier League, forming a partnership with club captain David Wetherall in central defence. In 2000–01, City were in financial difficulties and facing relegation when Newcastle United bid for O'Brien. After 133 league appearances he moved to St James' Park in March 2001 for a club record £2 million fee, equalling the same fee Des Hamilton had also left Bradford City to Newcastle.

=== Newcastle United ===
He quickly became a central figure in the Magpies defence, making more than 170 league and cup appearances in the ensuing four years. His performances also earned O'Brien a call-up to the Republic of Ireland national football team. One of his first games saw him score an equaliser in a north-east derby with Sunderland, while in his first full season the club secured a place in the Champions League qualifiers. The following season the club bought defenders Titus Bramble during the summer and Jonathan Woodgate in the January transfer window and it looked like O'Brien would be third choice but over the following year manager Bobby Robson settled on O'Brien and Woodgate as his central defensive partnership.

Despite several years as a solid defender at Newcastle, O'Brien suffered from poor form in the latter part of the 2004–05 campaign, as Newcastle finished a disappointing 14th in the Premier League. However, his reputation was such that Portsmouth paid £2 million to bring him to Fratton Park.

=== Portsmouth ===
O'Brien was Alain Perrin's first signing for Portsmouth. Although he started the season poorly, his form improved as the campaign wore on. However injury forced him to miss the conclusion of his first season. He fell down the Portsmouth first-team list with the arrival of Sol Campbell and the good form of club captain Linvoy Primus.

=== Bolton Wanderers ===
There were rumours that Sunderland's Irish boss Roy Keane would sign the centre back. This came after Keane signed many Irish players to represent Sunderland. Instead he signed for Bolton on 13 August 2007.

O'Brien quickly settled at the Reebok Stadium and impressed the fans in his first few appearances as part of the Wanderers squad including a dominating performance in the UEFA Cup tie against FK Rabotnicki and in the Premier League against Tottenham Hotspur.

O'Brien, after captaining the team in a UEFA Cup game against Sporting CP, said he was having the time of his life at Bolton.

In May 2008, his efforts were recognised by Wanderers supporters when he was named as The Bolton News Player of the Season following a poll held by the newspaper.

On 7 October 2008, O'Brien signed an extension to his contract at Bolton until 2011 and once again reaffirmed his happiness at the Reebok Stadium.

On 11 April 2009, O'Brien scored his first goal in four and a half years, and his first goal for Bolton, against Chelsea at Stamford Bridge. After being a regular starter under Gary Megson, O'Brien found himself on the substitutes bench when Owen Coyle took over, with Gary Cahill and Zat Knight the preferred central defender partnership. After Middlesbrough offered to loan O'Brien from Bolton, Owen Coyle rejected the loan move preferring to keep O'Brien as backup

=== Leeds United ===
During the 2010–11 season, O'Brien picked up a hamstring injury for Bolton in the Premier League game against Aston Villa. O'Brien joined Leeds United on an initial one month's loan on 29 October 2010. Manager Simon Grayson said of the move "Andy has had a fantastic career, and has great experience. He's a leader and will be a valuable member of the squad for the next [month]." The move saw O'Brien re-join the club he started his career at, he was released by Leeds 17 years earlier as a 14-year-old. O'Brien was given squad number 40 and made his debut for against Scunthorpe United. In November 2010, O'Brien revealed that he would be interested in possibly making his loan move to Leeds permanent. O'Brien scored his first goal for Leeds with a header against Hull City. On 24 November, the loan was extended until 4 January 2011.

After a two-game spell on the sidelines with injury, O'Brien returned to Leeds' starting lineup against Leicester City. O'Brien scored two own goals against his former club Portsmouth. On 30 December, manager Simon Grayson confirmed he wanted to sign O'Brien permanently. O'Brien was also subject of interest from Cardiff City.

On 1 January 2011, O'Brien signed a permanent deal with Leeds United on a 2 1/2-year contract, which took effect after his loan deal came to an end on 4 January 2011. He turned down a lucrative offer from Cardiff City, opting to move permanently to Leeds. On 8 January, O'Brien put in an impressive performance to help earn Leeds a 1–1 draw against Arsenal, Leeds were 1–0 up when Robert Snodgrass scored a second half penalty, Arsenal equalised in the 90th minute when Cesc Fàbregas scored a penalty. O'Brien picked up an injury in the FA Cup replay against Arsenal and subsequently missed the game against his former club Portsmouth. O'Brien scored his second goal for Leeds in the 3–2 loss against Millwall.

==== 2011–12 season ====
After picking up a hip injury during the 2011–12 pre-season he missed all the pre-season games, to return against his former club Newcastle United. Then stepped up his recovery against Leicester City in a behind closed doors friendly. The summer also saw O'Brien take the number 5 shirt after previously occupying the number 40 shirt. O'Brien started for Leeds the opening day of the season as they crashed to a 3–1 defeat against Southampton, with O'Brien at fault for the second goal when his backwards header was converted by Adam Lallana. He was given a torrid time against his former club Bradford City and was substituted to loud jeers in the second half with Leeds 2–1 down. Leeds went on to win the game 3–2. O'Brien dropped out of the Leeds squad for the following game on 13 August against Middlesbrough in a match Leeds lost 1–0.

After nearly three months out of the side, O'Brien returned to the Leeds team due to the suspension and injury of Tom Lees and Darren O'Dea and helped Leeds keep a clean sheet against Leicester City on 6 November. O'Brien was linked with a loan move to West Ham during November, however manager Simon Grayson revealed he wasn't looking to send O'Brien out on loan.

After Leeds 2–1 win against Burnley on 19 November, manager Simon Grayson revealed post match, that O'Brien had come to him the day before the game and refused to play for Leeds ever again. Grayson subsequently stated that O'Brien's career at Leeds was now over due to his refusal to play, however, it later emerged O'Brien's refusal to play was down to the fact he was at time suffering from depression and was "not in the right state of mind" when he stated he would no longer play for Leeds. After manager Simon Grayson was sacked, O'Brien played his first game for Leeds as a substitute against Coventry City.

He was transfer listed by Neil Warnock at the end of the 2011–12 season and told to find a new club. On 4 May 2012, O'Brien lost his squad number, when the number 5 shirt previously occupied by him was given to new signing Jason Pearce.

=== Vancouver Whitecaps ===
On 1 August 2012, O'Brien moved to Canadian MLS club Vancouver Whitecaps FC on a free transfer from Leeds United. Having signed a two-year contract, he made his debut on 8 August against Real Salt Lake. In his second MLS season, having already made 25 appearances in his first year of service, it was announced that he had signed a one-year extension with the Whitecaps. After the conclusion of the 2014 campaign, O'Brien entered into contract talks with the Whitecaps, but the two sides were unable to reach an agreement. After 50 appearances for the club, it was announced that Whitecaps were "moving in a different direction," and thanked O'Brien publicly on Twitter.

== International career ==
O'Brien has dual British-Irish citizenship, and despite representing England at under 18 and under 21 level, he elected to represent the Republic of Ireland at under 21 and senior level. O'Brien's performances for Newcastle led to him being called up to the Republic of Ireland national football team, earning his first cap against Estonia in Tallinn in 2001. He later became a regular in the Irish squad, and was included as part of their 2002 World Cup squad. He scored his first, and ultimately only, goal for Republic of Ireland to give his country a 1–0 win against Portugal on 9 February 2005.

After being picked for the squad to face Brazil on 6 February 2008, he did not report for training on 3 February 2008 and Republic of Ireland caretaker manager Don Givens received a message from O'Brien announcing his retirement from international football. He played 26 games for Republic of Ireland, with his last coming against Cyprus on 7 October 2006.

== Career statistics ==
=== Club ===
Appearances and goals by club, season and competition
Club	Season	League			National Cup (Note: Includes FA Cup and Voyageurs Cup)		League Cup (Note: Includes Football League Cup)		Continental (Note: Includes UEFA Intertoto Cup, UEFA Champions League, UEFA Cup)		Total	
Club	Season	Division	Apps	Goals	Apps	Goals	Apps	Goals	Apps	Goals	Apps	Goals
Bradford City	1996–97	First Division	22	2	3	0	0	0	—		25	2
Bradford City	1997–98	First Division	26	0	1	0	0	0	—		27	0
Bradford City	1998–99	First Division	30	0	1	0	3	0	—		34	0
Bradford City	1999–2000	Premier League	36	1	2	0	2	0	—		40	1
Bradford City	2000–01	Premier League	18	0	1	0	0	0	4	0	23	0
Bradford City	Total		132	3	8	0	5	0	4	0	149	3
Newcastle United	2000–01	Premier League	9	1	0	0	0	0	—		9	1
Newcastle United	2001–02	Premier League	34	2	5	1	4	0	1	0	44	3
Newcastle United	2002–03	Premier League	26	0	1	0	0	0	12	0	39	0
Newcastle United	2003–04	Premier League	28	1	1	0	0	0	13	0	42	1
Newcastle United	2004–05	Premier League	23	2	3	0	1	0	11	0	38	2
Newcastle United	Total		120	6	10	1	5	0	37	0	172	7
Portsmouth	2005–06	Premier League	29	0	2	0	1	0	—		32	0
Portsmouth	2006–07	Premier League	3	0	0	0	2	0	—		5	0
Portsmouth	Total		32	0	2	0	3	0	0	0	37	0
Bolton Wanderers	2007–08	Premier League	32	0	1	0	1	0	8	0	42	0
Bolton Wanderers	2008–09	Premier League	34	1	1	0	1	0	—		36	1
Bolton Wanderers	2009–10	Premier League	6	0	3	0	0	0	—		9	0
Bolton Wanderers	2010–11	Premier League	2	0	0	0	1	0	—		3	0
Bolton Wanderers	Total		74	1	5	0	3	0	8	0	90	1
Leeds United (loan)	2010–11	Championship	11	1	0	0	0	0	—		11	1
Leeds United	2010–11	Championship	19	1	2	0	0	0	—		21	1
Leeds United	2011–12	Championship	4	0	0	0	2	0	0	0	6	0
Leeds United	Total		34	2	2	0	2	0	0	0	38	0
Vancouver Whitecaps	2012	Major League Soccer	9	0	0	0	—		—		9	0
Vancouver Whitecaps	2013	Major League Soccer	16	0	4	0	—		—		20	0
Vancouver Whitecaps	2014	Major League Soccer	27	0	0	0	—		—		27	0
Vancouver Whitecaps	Total		52	0	4	0	0	0	0	0	56	0
Career total			409	10	29	1	29	0	36	0	503	11

=== International ===
Appearances and goals by national team and year
National team	Year	Apps	Goals
Republic of Ireland	2001	3	0
Republic of Ireland	2002	2	0
Republic of Ireland	2003	3	0
Republic of Ireland	2004	9	0
Republic of Ireland	2005	5	1
Republic of Ireland	2006	4	0
Total		26	1

== Honours ==
Bolton Wanderers

- The Bolton News Readers' player of the season 2007–08

Bradford City

- Promotion: Division One (Championship) runners up 1998–99

== See also ==
- List of Republic of Ireland international footballers born outside the Republic of Ireland
