= Dennis Sepp =

Dutch footballer

Personal information
- Date of birth: 7 June 1973 (age 53)
- Place of birth: Apeldoorn, Netherlands
- Position: Striker

Senior career*
Years	Team	Apps	(Gls)
- HSC '21
1997–1998	Bradford City	3	(0)
- HSC '21
- SC Enschede
2007	Excelsior '31		
- * Club domestic league appearances and goals

Dennis Sepp (born 7 June 1973) is a Dutch former professional footballer who played for HSC '21, SC Enschede and Excelsior '31 in the Netherlands, as well as for Bradford City in England.
