= Christian Sansam =

English footballer

Personal information
- Full name: Christian Sansam
- Date of birth: 26 December 1975 (age 50)
- Place of birth: Hull, England
- Height: 1.83 m (6 ft 0 in)
- Position: Midfielder

Youth career
- Scunthorpe United

Senior career*
Years	Team	Apps	(Gls)
1993–1996	Scunthorpe United	21	(1)
1996	→ Halifax Town (loan)	5	(1)
1996	Scarborough	6	(0)
1996	Bradford City	1	(0)
1996–1997	Hull City	3	(0)
1997–1999	Woodlands Wellington		
Total		36	(2)
- * Club domestic league appearances and goals

Christian Sansam (born 26 December 1975) is an English retired professional footballer who played as a midfielder.

== Playing career ==
Born in Hull, Sansam played in the Football League for Scunthorpe United, Scarborough, Bradford City and Hull City, and in Singapore for Woodlands Wellington. While a Scunthorpe United player, Sansam spent a month on loan to Halifax Town; he made five appearances in the Conference and scored once.

== Later career ==
As of November 2020 Sansam is working as kitman for Peterborough United, having previously held the same role at Doncaster Rovers.
