= Lawrence Davies =

Welsh footballer

Personal information
- Full name: Lawrence Davies
- Date of birth: 3 September 1977 (age 49)
- Place of birth: Abergavenny, Wales
- Height: 6 ft 1 in (1.85 m)
- Position: Striker

Youth career
- 199?–1996: Leeds United

Senior career*
Years	Team	Apps	(Gls)
1996–1997	Leeds United	0	(0)
1997–1999	Bradford City	4	(0)
1997	→ Darlington (loan)	2	(0)
1998	→ Hartlepool United (loan)	3	(0)
1999	Brighton & Hove Albion	8	(0)
1999–2003	Barry Town	65	(13)
2003–2004	Carmarthen Town	5	(0)
2004	Cwmbrân Town	3	(0)
Total		90	(13)
- * Club domestic league appearances and goals

Lawrence Davies (born 3 September 1977) is a Welsh former professional footballer who played as a striker. He made 17 appearances in the Football League, and represented his country at youth level.

== Career ==
Davies was born in Abergavenny, Wales. He began his football career in England as a trainee with Leeds United, and played for Wales youth's 1995 Milk Cup-winning team, before moving on to Bradford City in 1997. He made his Football League debut while on loan at Third Division club Darlington in December 1997, and made four First Division appearances for his parent club later that season. A loan spell at Hartlepool United in 1998 was interrupted by injury, and he moved on in February 1999 to Brighton & Hove Albion, where he appeared in eight Third Division matches, mainly as a substitute. He then returned to Wales where he played for Welsh Premier League clubs Barry Town, Carmarthen Town and Cwmbrân Town.
