= Chris Kamara =

Former English football player and manager (born 1957)

Chris Kamara MBE
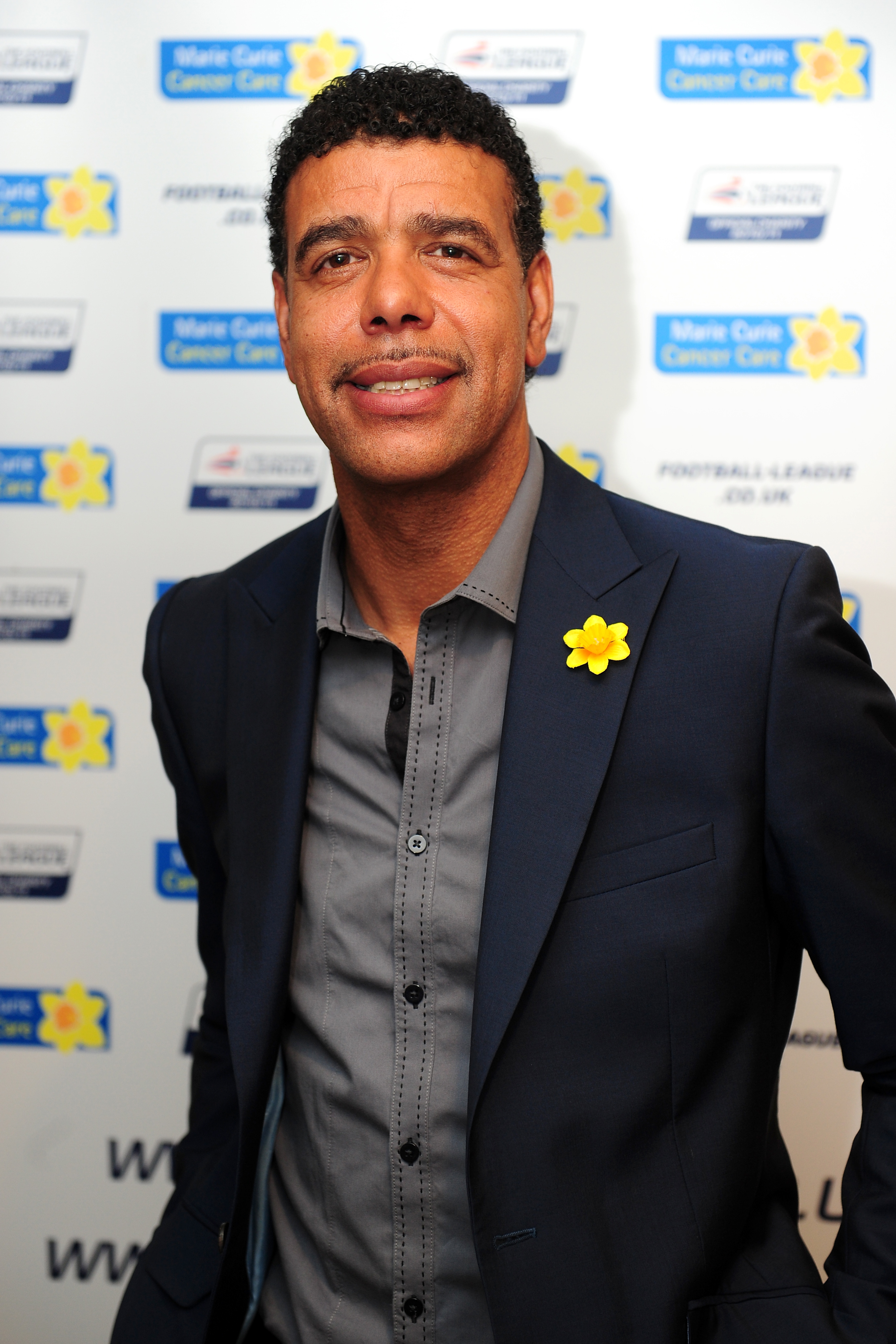
- Kamara in 2011

Personal information
- Full name: Christopher Kamara
- Date of birth: 25 December 1957 (age 68)
- Place of birth: Middlesbrough, England
- Height: 6 ft 1 in (1.85 m)
- Position: Midfielder

Youth career
- 1974–1975: Portsmouth

Senior career*
Years	Team	Apps	(Gls)
1975–1977	Portsmouth	63	(7)
1977–1981	Swindon Town	147	(21)
1981	Portsmouth	11	(0)
1981–1985	Brentford	152	(28)
1985–1988	Swindon Town	86	(6)
1988–1990	Stoke City	60	(5)
1990–1991	Leeds United	20	(1)
1991–1993	Luton Town	49	(0)
1992–1993	→ Sheffield United (loan)	8	(0)
1993	→ Middlesbrough (loan)	5	(0)
1993–1994	Sheffield United	16	(0)
1994–1995	Bradford City	23	(3)
2012–2013	Welshpool Town	2	(0)
Total		643	(71)

Managerial career
- 1995–1998: Bradford City
- 1998: Stoke City
- * Club domestic league appearances and goals

Christopher Kamara (born 25 December 1957) is an English former professional footballer and manager who worked as a presenter and football analyst at Sky Sports between 1992 and 2022.

He joined the Royal Navy at the age of 16 before being signed by Portsmouth in November 1974. A midfielder, he spent three years at the club before being sold to Swindon Town for £14,000. He returned to Portsmouth in 1981, for a £50,000 fee, but was transferred to Brentford in October 1981. He spent four years with the "Bees" before leaving the club after picking up a runners-up medal in the 1985 Football League Trophy final.

Kamara re-signed with Swindon Town in August 1985 and helped the club to two successive promotions into the Second Division. He moved to Stoke City in 1988, and a successful spell with the club won him a move to Leeds United in 1990. He helped the club to the Second Division title in 1989–90 but was injured for eight months before being sold to Luton Town for £150,000 in 1991. He had loan spells with Premier League clubs Sheffield United and Middlesbrough before joining Sheffield United on a permanent basis in 1993. The following year, he joined Bradford City as a player-coach.

Kamara was appointed Bradford City manager in November 1995 and took the club from a relegation scrap to promotion out of the Second Division via the play-offs in 1996. He left the club in January 1998 and quickly took the reins at Stoke City before being relieved of his duties in April 1998. From there, he became a broadcaster with Sky Sports and has since appeared as a presenter on numerous other television programmes.

== Early life ==
Kamara was born in Middlesbrough, North Riding of Yorkshire, to a Sierra Leonean father, Alimamy Kindo "Albert" Kamara, and British national Irene Kamara, on Christmas Day in 1957. Through his father he was eligible to play for Sierra Leone, and was called up to play in the 1994 African Cup of Nations, though he declined the offer.

His father was a heavy gambler, leaving his mother Irene to occasionally plead for money from neighbours in order to provide food for Kamara and his brother George and sister Maria. Being one of the few black families in Park End, the family suffered racist abuse.

He remains a close friend of Middlesbrough chairman Steve Gibson, with whom he grew up on the Park End council estate. He and Gibson regularly attended matches together.

He joined the Royal Navy at age 16, at the insistence of his father, himself a former naval mariner. In doing so he missed the youth cup final for Middlesbrough Boys, though he went on to play for the Royal Navy's football team. He was trained at HMS Raleigh at Torpoint and later transferred to HMS Vernon.

== Playing career ==
Kamara's football career started when he was spotted playing for the Navy by Portsmouth manager Ian St John, who signed him on apprentice wages in November 1974 after agreeing to pay the Navy a £200 buy-out fee. Youth team coach Ray Crawford told the Portsmouth News that Kamara was "weak in the air, his marking is wayward and he hasn't got much positional sense", but privately told Kamara that he had the potential to become a first team player. He made his first team debut in August 1975 in a 2–0 defeat by Luton Town, winning his chance after Mick Mellows was struck down with a knee injury. The next match he scored his first senior goal in a 4–1 loss to Bolton Wanderers after being set up by Bobby McGuinness. He went on to play regular football at Fratton Park in the 1975–76 season as "Pompey" were relegated out of the Second Division in last place. The club avoided relegation out of the Third Division by a single point in 1976–77, after which new manager Jimmy Dickinson sold Kamara to Third Division rivals Swindon Town for £14,000.

Upon joining Swindon he was sent death threats by Portsmouth supporters, and was given police escorts to the County Ground. He scored on his debut against Sheffield Wednesday at Hillsborough, but was frequently left out of the starting eleven by manager Danny Williams during the 1977–78 campaign. New boss Bobby Smith took the "Robins" to within three points of promotion in 1978–79, and then the semi-finals of the League Cup in 1979–80. John Trollope replaced Smith as manager following a dismal start to the 1980–81 campaign, and he sold Kamara back to Portsmouth for £50,000.

He was re-signed to Portsmouth by Frank Burrows, who had previously coached Kamara at Swindon. However, in October 1981 he was again transferred after Brentford manager Fred Callaghan agreed to a swap deal with David Crown going the other way. Kamara was paired with Terry Hurlock in a highly committed central midfield partnership at Griffin Park. He settled in well during the 1981–82 campaign and scored a career best of eleven goals in the 1982–83 season as Brentford posted two top ten finishes. The club then struggled to just one place above the Third Division relegation zone in 1983–84 before rising to 13th place in 1984–85. He won a Football League Trophy runners-up medal in 1985, playing at Wembley in a 3–1 defeat to Wigan Athletic. He took the decision to leave the club in summer 1985 after he rejected manager Frank McLintock's offer of a new one-year contract on the same terms.

Kamara re-joined Swindon Town in August 1985 for a fee of £12,500 despite suffering from a ruptured hamstring tendon. Under the guidance of Lou Macari the "Robins" won promotion out of the Fourth Division as champions in 1985–86, though Kamara missed the first half of the campaign and only played 23 games. He missed just four games of the 1986–87 season as Swindon secured a second successive promotion by beating Gillingham in the play-offs; Kamara missed the replay but played in the original home and away leg fixtures of the tie. However, Kamara became the first English player to be convicted of grievous bodily harm for an on-pitch incident, after breaking Shrewsbury Town player Jim Melrose's cheekbone with a punch straight after the final whistle of a game in the 1987–88 season; he was fined £1,200.

Kamara moved on again in the summer of 1988 after choosing to reject Swindon's offer of a one-year contract. He instead joined Mick Mills at Stoke City. He was paired with Peter Beagrie in central midfield at the Victoria Ground. He had a good 1988–89 season, scoring five goals in 44 appearances and he won the player of the year award. On 19 August 1989 he was involved in a challenge where West Ham United's Frank McAvennie was stretchered off and required surgery on his ankle; McAvennie attempted to sue Kamara for damages but was unsuccessful. Midway through the 1989–90 season Mills was dismissed and replaced by Alan Ball, who promptly sold Kamara to Leeds United. In joining Leeds he rejected the offer to join Bruce Rioch's Middlesbrough – his hometown club that was owned by childhood friend Steve Gibson.

At Elland Road were David Batty, Vinnie Jones, Gordon Strachan and Gary Speed; the presence of these highly skilled midfielders meant that Kamara was frequently left on the bench by manager Howard Wilkinson. Kamara helped Leeds win the Second Division title in 1989–90 but appeared sparingly for the "Whites" in the First Division after finding himself injured with an Achilles tendon problem during the 1990–91 campaign. He left Leeds in November 1991 and they went on to win the First Division title.

Kamara remained in the top flight by joining David Pleat's Luton Town for a £150,000 fee after returning to full fitness. The "Hatters" were relegated on the last day of the 1991–92 season after letting slip a 1–0 lead over Notts County to lose the game 2–1.

In October 1992, Kamara returned to the top flight, now called the Premier League, after joining Dave Bassett's Sheffield United on loan. During this time he had the opportunity to play for Sierra Leone, the country of his father, but declined to focus on getting back into the first team Despite failing to nail down a regular first team place in the 1992–93 season he made the move from Kenilworth Road to Bramall Lane permanent. Before joining United he finally joined his hometown club Middlesbrough, albeit on a one-month loan, in February 1993. His spell at Ayresome Park lasted just five games as manager Lennie Lawrence could not afford to offer him a permanent contract. The "Blades" were relegated at the end of the 1993–94 campaign after slipping into the relegation zone on the final day of the season after a defeat by Chelsea.

Kamara signed with Bradford City in summer 1994 after being offered a playing-coaching role by manager Lennie Lawrence. The "Bantams" struggled in the 1994–95 season, though Kamara was promoted to assistant manager in April 1995.

== Managerial career ==
=== Bradford City ===
In November 1995, Bradford City chairman Geoffrey Richmond dismissed manager Lennie Lawrence and promoted Kamara from assistant manager to take Lawrence's place. His goal was to keep the "Bantams" out of the relegation zone by the end of the 1995–96 season. However, the club went on a run of just three defeats in the final thirteen games to secure a place in the play-offs. They turned round a 2–0 defeat at Valley Parade in the first leg of the play-off semi-finals to beat Sam Allardyce's Blackpool at Bloomfield Road. Promotion was secured with a 2–0 victory over Notts County in the play-off final with goals from Des Hamilton and Mark Stallard.

He signed Australian goalkeeper Mark Schwarzer from 1. FC Kaiserslautern for £150,000, who proved to be a more than adequate replacement for Gavin Ward, who was sold to Bolton Wanderers for £300,000. He paid a club record £550,000 for Gordon Watson, who played just two games before being badly injured after a challenge from Huddersfield Town defender Kevin Gray. The 1996–97 season saw Bradford narrowly escape relegation after a final day victory over Queens Park Rangers.

In summer 1997, he brought in Darren Moore and Robbie Blake, whilst paying £50,000 for Jamie Lawrence and another £50,000 for Peter Beagrie. He also signed Brazilian striker Edinho and former England international Chris Waddle on free transfers. He remained at Valley Parade until he left the club in January 1998. He and chairman Geoffrey Richmond had fallen out over Richmond's insistence on becoming heavily involved in the club's transfer policy. He recommended his assistant Paul Jewell to be his successor, who went on to have his own highly successful spell as Bradford's manager.

=== Stoke City ===
On 22 January 1998, he was appointed manager of one of his former clubs, Stoke City, and arrived with bold intentions at the Britannia Stadium stating that he would build a squad good enough to take the club into the Premier League. However, with Stoke already in serious relegation trouble in 1997–98, Kamara sold their only player of real value, Andy Griffin to Newcastle United. He fell out with chief executive Jez Moxey over how to spend the proceeds of the sale; Moxey wanted Marco Gabbiadini but Kamara vetoed the deal. He instead spent £350,000 on Coventry City striker Kyle Lightbourne. In his 14 games in charge with the "Potters", only one was won and he was dismissed on 8 April 1998. In Kamara's three months in charge, Stoke could not recover from their poor form and were relegated to the third tier.

== Media career ==
Kamara gave up on management after his time at Stoke City and instead worked as a pundit for a number of television and radio stations. He won a regular slot on Soccer Extra with Brian Woolnough in 1999, and from there was asked by Rob McCaffrey to contribute to Soccer Saturday on Sky Sports. There he was asked to attend a match on Saturday and appear over live video link providing brief updates on the match. At the time this was an untried concept in the UK, and Kamara and his camera crew largely learned how to best present the format as they went along. He quickly became well known on the programme for his highly excitable nature, propensity for comical gaffes, and tendency to come out with unusual sayings that baffled host Jeff Stelling and the other studio pundits, such as his observation that the Tottenham players were "fighting like beavers" in their match against Arsenal. In one of his more famous on-air gaffes, he failed to realise that Anthony Vanden Borre had been sent off in the game he was watching between Portsmouth and Blackburn Rovers, instead thinking that he had been substituted.

Kamara also began presenting the weekly Sky Sports show Goals on Sunday in August 2000, and provided additional commentary on some of Sky's televised matches. He was also a regular guest on Soccer AM, interviewing players and managers at grounds around the country.

Before the 2010 FIFA World Cup, Kamara changed his name by deed poll to Chris Cabanga (Cabanga is a Zulu word meaning "to think" or "imagine") in response to a Facebook campaign supported by 20,000 people.

In 2012, he made a special appearance for Mid Wales Football League side Welshpool Town, after his Sky Sports colleague Jeff Stelling mocked the strugglers following the club's 10–1 loss to Waterloo Rovers the previous week. Welshpool manager David Jones emailed Sky explaining how the club nearly folded, and Sky made amends by arranging for Kamara to play for them. He played the full 90 minutes, in midfield in a 6–1 defeat, assisting a goal with a corner. On 28 March 2013, he appeared for a second time; more than 500 fans turned out to watch the game which Welshpool lost 4–1 to Newbridge-on-Wye in the Spar Mid Wales League.

Kamara co-presented the ITV series Ninja Warrior UK alongside Ben Shephard and Rochelle Humes. The first series began airing in April 2015 and the second in January 2016. A third series of Ninja Warrior UK began in December 2016. In 2015, Kamara took part in ITV's Give a Pet a Home series which worked alongside the RSPCA in Birmingham.

In February 2016, Kamara appeared in an episode of The Great Sport Relief Bake Off and in June 2016, he provided the commentary for Soccer Aid 2016 alongside Clive Tyldesley. Since February 2017, Kamara has provided commentary for the 'Ant vs. Dec' segment of Ant & Dec's Saturday Night Takeaway.

In 2021, Kamara played himself on Ted Lasso, as a pundit on a fictional version of Soccer Saturday, along with presenter Jeff Stelling.

In April 2022, it was announced that Kamara would be leaving Sky Sports at the end of the 2021–22 football season after working on Soccer Saturday for 24 years.

On 26 December 2024, Kamara made his first football broadcasting appearance since leaving Sky Sports, when he was part of the reporting team during Amazon Prime's coverage of the Boxing Day Premier League fixtures (which was presented by former colleague Stelling).

=== Television credits ===
Year	Title	Role	Channel	Notes
2000–22	Goals on Sunday	Co-presenter	Sky Sports	With Alex Scott (currently)
2011	That Sunday Night Show	Guest	ITV	1 episode
2011	John Bishop's Britain	Football pundit	BBC One	5 episodes
2012, 2016	8 Out of 10 Cats	Guest	Channel 4/More4	2 episodes
2013	Tipping Point: Lucky Stars	Contestant	ITV	1 episode; won £400 for Marie Curie Cancer Care
2014	The Chase: Celebrity Special	Contestant	ITV	1 episode
2015–2022	Ninja Warrior UK	Co-presenter	ITV	5 series; with Ben Shephard and Rochelle Humes
2015	Give a Pet a Home	Celebrity contributor	ITV	1 series
2015, 2016, 2017	Celebrity Juice	Guest	ITV2	3 episodes
2015	Tipping Point for Text Santa	Contestant	ITV	1 episode; won £500 for the Text Santa charities
2016	The Big Fat Quiz of Everything	Guest	Channel 4	1 episode
2016	Loose Women	Guest	ITV	2 episodes
2016	The Great Sport Relief Bake Off	Contestant	BBC One	1 episode
2016	You're Back in the Room	Guest	ITV	1 episode
2016	Play to the Whistle	Guest	ITV	1 episode
2016	Soccer Aid 2016	Commentator	ITV	Live football event
2016	Murder in Successville	Guest	BBC Three	1 episode
2016	It's Not Me, It's You	Guest	Channel 5	1 episode
2016	Celebrity Storage Hunters	Participant	Dave	1 episode
2016	Have I Got News for You	Guest	BBC One	1 episode
2016	Would I Lie to You? Christmas Special	Guest	BBC One	1 episode
2017	Ant & Dec's Saturday Night Takeaway	Commentator	ITV	1 episode; 'Ant vs. Dec' segment
2017	Harry Hill's Alien Fun Capsule	Commentator	ITV	1 episode
2017	The Keith & Paddy Picture Show	Ray Parker Jr.	ITV	1 episode
2017	Possibly...The Best Adverts in the World	Guest	ITV	One-off episode
2017	Guess the Star	Performer	ITV	One-off episode
2018	Room 101	Guest	BBC One	1 episode
2018	Through the Keyhole	Panellist	ITV	1 episode
2018	Catchphrase: Celebrity Special	Contestant	ITV	Episodes 11 and 13 (2018 World Cup)
2018	All Together Now: Celebrity Special	Contestant	BBC One	1 episode
2018	The Crystal Maze: Celebrity Special	Contestant	Channel 4	1 episode
2018	Michael McIntyre's Big Show	Guest	BBC One	1 episode
2019	Emmerdale	Himself	ITV	1 episode (cameo)
2020	The Big New Year's In	Guest	BBC One	One-off special
2021	Ted Lasso	Himself	Apple TV+	3 episodes
2021	Code 404	Himself	Sky Comedy	1 episode (Season 2, Episode 1)
2022	Cash in the Attic	Presenter	Channel 5	
2022	Chris Kamara: Lost for Words	Himself	ITV	Documentary
2023	The Masked Singer	Ghost	ITV	Unmasked in episode 1

== Other work ==
In September 2000, Chris Kamara's Street Soccer was released for the PlayStation, for which Kamara provided both commentary and some basic motion capture for player animation, with the concept of the game pre-dating the EA Sports' FIFA Street series. He was also a commentator for 2005's This Is Football, alongside Peter Drury.

Kamara was formerly the chairman of the panel which chooses the Football League Championship Manager of the Month award, but left the role for the beginning of the 2009–10 season.

=== Charity work ===
Kamara was inducted into the Show Racism the Red Card Hall of Fame in 2004. As a player, he suffered years of severe racial abuse.

Since May 2010 Kamara has been a national ambassador for Marie Curie, fronting the Charity of the Season partnership with the Football League in 2010/2011. In December 2011 he received 'The Above & Beyond in Memory of Sir Bill Cotton award' for his contributions to the charity. He and a team of Football League ambassadors, including Brendan Rodgers, Aidy Boothroyd, and Middlesbrough chairman Steve Gibson, managed to raise £385,000 for the charity and to climb to the peak of Mount Kilimanjaro. Kamara became an Ambassador of the Special Olympics Great Britain Organisation in April 2011 after taking part in the Special Olympics Unity Cup as a celebrity partner before the Germany v Argentina quarter-final match in Cape Town, during the 2010 FIFA World Cup.

=== Singing career ===
Kamara released a charity single entitled Sing 4 England in 2012 as England's officially sanctioned tournament song for Euro 2012.

In November 2019, Kamara released his debut album, Here's to Christmas, which reached number 8 in the charts. He released a second Christmas album, And a Happy New Year, on 27 November 2020.

On 1 January 2023, Kamara appeared as the character "Ghost" on the fourth series of The Masked Singer, singing "Save the Last Dance for Me". He was the first contestant to be unmasked and eliminated.

=== Books ===
In April 2010, Kamara published Mr Unbelievable; the autobiography focuses on his football career and how it led to football punditry.

On 9 November 2023, Kamara's second autobiography, titled Kammy, was published. In the book, Kamara recounts his tough upbringing, his time as a football player and time spent as a football manager.

== Personal life ==
Kamara married Anne on 29 May 1982; the couple have two sons. They have resided in Wakefield, West Yorkshire, since 1990.

In April 2021, Kamara announced that he would be stepping back from sports presenting, after being diagnosed with an underactive thyroid. He had experienced "brain fog" during an interview on The One Show. In a September 2022 podcast interview with FootballJOE, he spoke of his struggle with speech problems before he was diagnosed in March 2022 with speech apraxia. In 2022, he was the subject of an ITV documentary, Lost for Words. In December 2022, he spoke of "suffering in silence" for 20 months before his underactive thyroid was diagnosed.

== Career statistics ==
=== As a player ===
Appearances and goals by club, season and competition
Club	Season	League			FA Cup		League Cup		Other^{[A]}		Total	
Club	Season	Division	Apps	Goals	Apps	Goals	Apps	Goals	Apps	Goals	Apps	Goals
Portsmouth	1975–76	Second Division	24	4	0	0	0	0	0	0	24	4
Portsmouth	1976–77	Third Division	39	3	4	1	1	0	0	0	44	4
Portsmouth	Total		63	7	4	1	1	0	0	0	68	8
Swindon Town	1977–78	Third Division	40	10	3	0	6	1	0	0	49	11
Swindon Town	1978–79	Third Division	28	2	3	2	5	0	0	0	36	4
Swindon Town	1979–80	Third Division	34	5	6	1	6	0	0	0	46	6
Swindon Town	1980–81	Third Division	45	4	2	1	5	0	0	0	52	5
Swindon Town	Total		147	21	14	4	22	1	0	0	183	26
Portsmouth	1981–82	Third Division	11	0	0	0	3	1	0	0	14	1
Brentford	1981–82	Third Division	31	5	3	0	0	0	0	0	34	5
Brentford	1982–83	Third Division	44	11	3	0	7	0	3 (Note: Appearances in Football League Group Cup)	0	57	11
Brentford	1983–84	Third Division	38	6	3	1	4	0	1 (Note: Appearances in Football League Trophy)	0	46	7
Brentford	1984–85	Third Division	39	6	4	1	4	1	6	1	53	9
Brentford	Total		152	28	13	2	15	1	10	1	190	32
Swindon Town	1985–86	Fourth Division	20	1	0	0	0	0	2	0	22	1
Swindon Town	1986–87	Third Division	42	3	2	0	4	0	8 (Note: Four appearances in Football League Trophy and four in Third Division play-offs)	0	56	3
Swindon Town	1987–88	Second Division	25	2	3	0	5	0	3 (Note: Appearances in Full Members' Cup)	0	36	2
Swindon Town	Total		87	6	5	0	9	0	13	0	114	6
Stoke City	1988–89	Second Division	38	4	3	0	2	1	1	0	44	5
Stoke City	1989–90	Second Division	22	1	1	0	2	0	2	1	27	2
Stoke City	Total		60	5	4	0	4	1	3	1	71	7
Leeds United	1989–90	Second Division	11	1	0	0	0	0	0	0	11	1
Leeds United	1990–91	First Division	7	0	0	0	2	0	0	0	9	0
Leeds United	1991–92	First Division	2	0	0	0	1	0	1	0	4	0
Leeds United	Total		20	1	0	0	3	0	1	0	24	1
Luton Town	1991–92	First Division	28	0	1	0	0	0	0	0	29	0
Luton Town	1992–93	First Division	21	0	0	0	2	0	2 (Note: Appearances in Anglo-Italian Cup)	0	25	0
Luton Town	Total		49	0	1	0	2	0	2	0	54	0
Sheffield United (loan)	1992–93	Premier League	8	0	0	0	0	0	0	0	8	0
Middlesbrough (loan)	1992–93	Premier League	5	0	0	0	0	0	0	0	5	0
Sheffield United	1993–94	Premier League	16	0	1	0	0	0	0	0	17	0
Bradford City	1994–95	Second Division	23	3	2	0	3	0	2	1	30	4
Career total			641	71	44	7	62	5	31	3	778	86

=== As a manager ===
Managerial record by team and tenure
Team	From	To	Record				
Team	From	To	P	W	D	L	Win %
Bradford City	27 November 1995	6 January 1998	112	40	26	46	35.7
Stoke City	22 January 1998	8 April 1998	14	1	5	8	7.1
Total			126	41	31	54	32.5

== Honours ==
=== As a player ===
Brentford

- Associate Members' Cup runner-up: 1984–85

Swindon Town

- Football League Fourth Division: 1985–86
- Football League Third Division play-offs: 1987

Leeds United

- Football League Second Division: 1989–90

Individual

- Swindon Town Player of the Season: 1979–80
- Stoke City Player of the Year: 1988–89

=== As manager ===
Bradford City

- Football League Second Division play-offs: 1996

=== General ===
Kamara was appointed Member of the Order of the British Empire (MBE) in the 2023 New Year Honours for services to association football, anti-racism and charity.

He was awarded the Freedom of the City of Wakefield, at County Hall, Wakefield, West Yorkshire, on 15 May 2024.

== See also ==
- Chris Kamara's Street Soccer, a 2000 video game
