= Richard Liburd =

English footballer (born 1973)

Personal information
- Full name: Richard John Liburd
- Date of birth: 26 September 1973 (age 53)
- Place of birth: Nottingham, England
- Position: Defender

Youth career
- 1990–1992: Nottingham Forest

Senior career*
Years	Team	Apps	(Gls)
1992–1993	Eastwood Town		
1993–1994	Middlesbrough	41	(1)
1994–1998	Bradford City	79	(3)
1998	Carlisle United	10	(0)
1998–2003	Notts County	154	(9)
2003–2004	Lincoln City	24	(0)
2004	Eastwood Town	?	(?)
- Boots Athletic
- Basford United
2008–??	Hucknall Town	0	(0)
- * Club domestic league appearances and goals as of 13:07, 7 November 2008 (UTC)

Richard Liburd (born 26 September 1973) is an English footballer who is a defender who last played for Hucknall Town. He previously played league football with Middlesbrough, Bradford City, Carlisle United, Notts County and Lincoln City.

== Playing career ==
Born in Nottingham, Liburd started out his football career as a youth trainee with Nottingham Forest. Released at the end of his two-year training period, he joined Eastwood Town. Rapidly making an impression at Eastwood, he joined Middlesbrough, on trial, in early 1993, completing a £72,500 transfer in March 1993. He played 41 games for 'Boro' until his next move was to join Bradford City for £200,000 in July 1994. He was a key member of the Bantams for more than three years, helping them to promotion from Division Two in 1995–96 before he left to join Carlisle United after 79 games at Valley Parade. His career took him to Notts County and Lincoln City before he returned to Eastwood.

His return lasted less than a season and Liburd was out of regular football until he joined Nottinghamshire Senior League club Boots Athletic in September 2006. He moved on to Basford United before departing in January 2007. In July 2007, he had an unsuccessful trial with Hucknall Town, appearing in a pre-season friendly against Carlton Town. However, in November 2008 he was signed for Hucknall by the new director of football Brian Chambers.
