= Nigel Pepper =

English footballer

Personal information
- Full name: Colin Nigel Pepper
- Date of birth: 25 April 1968 (age 58)
- Place of birth: Rotherham, England
- Height: 5 ft 10 in (1.78 m)
- Position: Midfielder

Senior career*
Years	Team	Apps	(Gls)
1986–1990	Rotherham United	45	(1)
1990–1997	York City	235	(39)
1997–1998	Bradford City	52	(11)
1998–2000	Aberdeen	14	(0)
1999–2000	→ Southend United (loan)	12	(2)
2000–2002	Scunthorpe United	3	(0)
2002–2008	Barrow	?	(?)
- * Club domestic league appearances and goals

Colin Nigel Pepper (born 25 April 1968 in Rotherham, England), more commonly known as Nigel Pepper, is an English retired professional footballer. He was a combative midfield player known for his powerful attacking free kicks and his solid work ethic. He was a member of the York City team that beat Manchester United 3–0 at Old Trafford in the League Cup in 1995.

== Career ==
=== Rotherham ===
Pepper joined his hometown club Rotherham United as an apprentice in 1985 when the club was playing in the old Division 3. He made his debut on 8 May 1986 at Wolverhampton Wanderers aged just 17. His first goal for the club came in a 3-2 League Cup defeat at Everton.

His only league goal for the club came in a 4–2 home win against Shrewsbury Town on 25 November 1989, when he came on as substitute.

He remained at the club until 1990 and was a part of the side both relegated in 1988 and promoted in 1989.

=== York City ===
Following a lack of first team opportunities at Rotherham, Pepper signed for York City on a free transfer on 18 July 1990. He made his debut in the 1990–91 season against Maidstone United. He helped the club secure promotion in 1992-93 scoring one of York's penalties in the 1993 Playoff Final shootout victory at Wembley over Crewe. In that season he also took over as the clubs penalty taker and netted 19 out of 22 penalties between 1990 and 1997. He was also pivotal in York making the Playoff Semi-Finals the following season, although they did not secure promotion, losing 1–0 over two legs to Stockport County.

Pepper was a member of the York team that beat Manchester United over two legs in the League Cup in 1995. Having beaten a weakened United team 3–0 at Old Trafford, York were beaten 3–1 at Bootham Crescent in the second leg but went through 4–3 on aggregate.

The following season, also in the League Cup, Pepper played in the York side that defeated Everton 4–3 over two legs.

He made 281 league and cup appearances for the club, scoring 45 times. His final game for club came on 25 February 1997 when he scored in a 3–1 home win over Preston.

=== Bradford City ===
Pepper joined Bradford City on 28 February 1997 for a fee of £100,000. Bradford manager Chris Kamara brought him in to add some steel to his central midfield. He made his club debut on 1 March 1997 in a 3–1 defeat at home to Manchester City. He went on to make a total of 52 appearances for Bradford over 3 seasons in Division 1, scoring 11 goals and helping them avoid relegation.

=== Aberdeen ===
On 26 November 1998 Pepper moved to Aberdeen for a fee of £300,000. In a match against Celtic in March 1999, Pepper was sent off for a wild tackle six minutes after coming on as a substitute; following his return from suspension, having come on as a substitute against Dundee United, it took just 17 seconds before he was sent off again.

Pepper made just 15 appearances in league and cup for the club, but failed to find the net, in a period where on-field disciplinary problems haunted him.

=== Southend United ===
Following his unhappy time in Scotland, on 23 December 1999 Pepper joined Southend United on loan for the remainder of the 1999/2000 season. He made a total of 12 appearances for The Seasiders, scoring 2 goals.

=== Scunthorpe United ===
At the end of his contract with Aberdeen, Pepper signed for Scunthorpe United on 7 June 2000 where he was immediately installed as club captain. However, in only his second game for the club against Kidderminster he sustained a double leg fracture just 13 minutes into the game in a challenge with Paul Webb and despite the injuries Pepper retaliated at Webb earning him a red card while he was being stretchered off the pitch.

Pepper struggled for over a year to return to full fitness and although he made 1 further substitute appearance for the club he was released at the end of his contract in June 2002.

=== Barrow ===
In 2004 Pepper joined non-League Barrow. He remained with the club until his retirement from football in 2008.

== Honours ==
York City

- Football League Third Division play-offs: 1993
