= Shaun Murray (footballer) =

English footballer

Personal information
- Full name: Shaun Murray
- Date of birth: 7 December 1970 (age 55)
- Place of birth: Newcastle upon Tyne, England
- Height: 5 ft 7 in (1.70 m)
- Position: Midfielder

Youth career
- 1987–1989: Tottenham Hotspur

Senior career*
Years	Team	Apps	(Gls)
1989–1993	Portsmouth	34	(1)
1993–1994	Scarborough	29	(5)
1994–1998	Bradford City	130	(8)
1998–2001	Notts County	55	(4)
2001	→ Kettering Town (loan)	5	(0)
2001–2003	Kettering Town	30	(2)
- * Club domestic league appearances and goals

Shaun Murray (born 7 February 1970) is an English former professional footballer who played in midfield. He made half of his appearances at Bradford City.

== Playing career ==
Murray was a trainee at Tottenham Hotspur where he was unable to make a single appearance. Instead, in 1989 he signed for Portsmouth for £100,000. Appearances were still limited and he played just 34 games in more than three seasons. He moved north to Scarborough where he played 29 times in his one season.

Bradford City spent £200,000 in 1994 to bring the midfielder to Valley Parade. Murray was a regular in his first two seasons at Bradford and he helped them to promotion in 1995–96 although he failed to earn a place in the play-off final against Notts County. Murray struggled to break into the team the following season until Chris Waddle left. Murray played the last 12 games of the season to help City avoid relegation in the final game. 1997–98 was Murray's final season at City after which he had played 130 games for the club, during which time he scored eight goals – five in his first season.

Murray moved to Notts County on a free transfer before he finished his career at Kettering Town.
