= Danny Verity =

English footballer

Personal information
- Full name: Daniel Richard Verity
- Date of birth: 19 April 1980 (age 46)
- Place of birth: Bradford, England
- Position: Central defender

Youth career
- –1997: Bradford City

Senior career*
Years	Team	Apps	(Gls)
1997–1999	Bradford City	1	(0)
1999	Harrogate Town		
2000	Bradford Park Avenue		
2001	Gresley Rovers	5	(0)
2001–2004	Eccleshill United		
2005–2006	Wibsey		
2008	Harrogate Railway Athletic		
2008–2009	Curzon Ashton		
- * Club domestic league appearances and goals

Daniel Richard Verity (born 19 April 1980) is an English professional footballer who plays as a central defender.

== Career ==
Verity made one appearance in the Football League for Bradford City during the 1997–98 season, and left the club in May 1999. He later played non-league football for a number of clubs, including Harrogate Town, Bradford Park Avenue, Harrogate Railway Athletic Gresley Rovers, Eccleshill United, and Curzon Ashton, as well as amateur football for Wibsey.
