= George Kulcsar =

Footballer (born 1967)

Personal information
- Full name: György Kulcsar
- Date of birth: 8 December 1967 (age 58)
- Place of birth: Budapest, Hungary
- Height: 1.83 m (6 ft 0 in)
- Position: Defender

Youth career
- 1983–1985: AIS

Senior career*
| Years | Team | Apps | (Gls) |
| 1986 | Canberra City | 6 | (0) |
| 1987 | St. George | 13 | (0) |
| 1992–1997 | Royal Antwerp | 66 | (1) |
| 1997–1998 | Bradford City | 27 | (1) |
| 1998–2000 | Queens Park Rangers | 56 | (1) |
| 2001 | Home United | 2 | (0) |
| Total | | 170 | (3) |

International career
| 1996–1997 | Australia | 3 | (0) |
- * Club domestic league appearances and goals

György "George" Kulcsar (born 8 December 1967) is a former footballer who played in Australia for AIS, Canberra City and St. George Saints, in Belgium for Royal Antwerp, in England for Bradford City (scoring once against Wolverhampton Wanderers) and Queens Park Rangers (scoring once against Crystal Palace), and in Singapore for Home United. Born in Hungary, he won three caps with the Australia national team.

== Career ==
Kulcsar suffered from meningitis in 1999.

In 2005, after a stint as the technical director of ANU Football Club, Kulcsar was appointed as Southern NSW Football's full-time coaching development manager.

In 2017, Kulcsar was suspended for 13 months from attending any soccer games following an incident where he, as the coach, entered the field of play and headbutted a player.

Kulcsar and his wife Petra Kulcsar run a retail shop.
