= Jamie Lawrence (footballer, born 1970) =

Jamaican former professional footballer (born 1970)

Personal information
- Full name: James Hubert Lawrence
- Date of birth: 8 March 1970 (age 56)
- Place of birth: Balham, London, England
- Height: 1.76 m (5 ft 9 1/2 in)
- Position: Right winger

Senior career*
Years	Team	Apps	(Gls)
1992–1993	Cowes Sports		
1993–1994	Sunderland	4	(0)
1994–1995	Doncaster Rovers	25	(3)
1995–1997	Leicester City	47	(1)
1997–2002	Bradford City	155	(12)
2002–2004	Walsall	22	(1)
2003	→ Wigan Athletic (loan)	4	(0)
2004	Grimsby Town	5	(1)
2004–2005	Brentford	14	(0)
2005–2006	Fisher Athletic		
2006–2007	Worthing	35	(5)
2007–2009	Harrow Borough		
2009	Margate	2	(0)
2009–2011	Ashford Town		
- Banstead Athletic
- Cobham
- Lingfield
Total		313	(23)

International career
2000–2004	Jamaica	24	(1)

Managerial career
- 2009–2011: Ashford Town
- 2018–2019: Kingstonian (assistant)
- * Club domestic league appearances and goals

James Hubert Lawrence (born 8 March 1970) is a football coach and former professional player who played as a right winger. He is a fitness coach for the Zambia national team.

He notably had spells in the Premier League with Leicester City and Bradford City, as well as playing in the Football League with Sunderland, Doncaster Rovers, Walsall, Wigan Athletic, Grimsby Town and Brentford. He also played non-league football for Cowes Sports, Fisher Athletic, Worthing, Harrow Borough, Margate, Banstead Athletic, Cobham and Lingfield. Born in England, he represented Jamaica at international level and was capped 24 times, scoring one goal.

As a coach Lawrence managed Ashford Town between 2009 and 2011 where he served as player/manager. In 2018 he was appointed assistant manager at Kingstonian. He also worked on the coaching setups of Whitehawk and the Ghana national team.

== Early life ==
Lawrence was born in Balham, London, before moving first to Totteridge House in Battersea for a year before settling more permanently on the Latchmere Estate and attending John Burns Primary School. His parents were from Jamaica. As a youth he served two prison sentences.

== Club career ==
He began his career in non-league with Cowes Sports in 1992, before turning professional with Sunderland. He made his professional debut for Sunderland on 20 October 1993.

In 1993 Jamie Lawrence was handed his first professional football contract with Sunderland by manager Terry Butcher. Within days of signing for the Roker Park club, he made his debut as a substitute in a televised match against Middlesbrough. Although Middlesbrough beat Sunderland 4–1, Lawrence had made enough of an impression to be selected to start in the following match against Luton Town.

Terry Butcher was sacked a month later and replaced by Mick Buxton where Lawrence was not part of the new managers' plans and he was sold to Doncaster Rovers for £20,000 on 17 March 1994. He also played professionally for Doncaster Rovers, Leicester City, Bradford City, Walsall, Wigan Athletic, Grimsby Town and Brentford. While playing with Leicester he appeared as a substitute in the 1997 Football League Cup Final replay.

He later played non-league football with Fisher Athletic, Worthing, Harrow Borough, Margate, Ashford Town, Banstead Athletic and Cobham. While playing for Harrow Borough he cut his knee during a match, and later contracted MRSA.

== International career ==
Lawrence earned 24 caps for Jamaica between 2000 and 2004, scoring one goal. He appeared in 11 FIFA World Cup qualifying matches.

== Coaching career ==
Lawrence was player-manager of Ashford Town between November 2009 and June 2011.

In December 2014 he signed a six-week contract with the Ghana national team, to be their fitness coach for the 2015 Africa Cup of Nations, having previously worked in a similar role with Sutton United.

Lawrence was appointed first-team coach at National League South Whitehawk in September 2017. He then had a spell as assistant manager at Kingstonian, leaving in February 2019.

As of March 2023 he was a fitness coach for the Zambia national team.

== Personal life ==
His autobiography From Prison to Premiership was released in 2006. It was re-released as an e-book in 2013.

Lawrence started the Jamie Lawrence Football Academy in Tooting 2008.

In April 2019 Lawrence spoke out against racism in football, revealing that during his playing career he had been racially abused by one of his own teammates.

In May 2020 Lawrence began a charity online workout to raise funds during the COVID-19 pandemic.

== Honours ==
Leicester City

- Football League Cup: 1996–97
