= Edinho (footballer, born 1967) =

Brazilian footballer

Personal information
- Full name: Edon Amaral Neto
- Date of birth: 21 February 1967 (age 59)
- Place of birth: Arapiraca, Brazil
- Position: Striker

Senior career*
Years	Team	Apps	(Gls)
1987	ASA	20	(8)
1988	Avaí	20	(4)
1989	São José	37	(14)
1990–1992	Olhanense	62	(23)
1992–1994	Portimonense	64	(28)
1994–1995	Chaves	32	(14)
1995–1996	Vitória Guimarães	42	(15)
1996–1998	Bradford City	60	(16)
1998	→ Dunfermline Athletic (loan)	9	(1)
1998–1999	Portimonense	6	(0)
1999–2000	União Lamas	29	(7)
2000–2003	Vizela	79	(46)
2003–2005	Olhanense	59	(25)
2005	Portosantense	11	(2)
2006	Juventude Évora		
2006–2007	Campinense		
2008–2009	Farense	?	(15)
Total		530	(218)

Managerial career
- 2008–2009: Farense (assistant)
- 2009: Farense
- * Club domestic league appearances and goals

Edon Amaral Neto (born 21 February 1967), commonly known as Edinho, is a Brazilian retired footballer who played as a striker.

== Playing career ==
Born in Arapiraca, Alagoas, Edinho played for modest clubs in his homeland. In 1990, he moved to Portugal where he spent four seasons competing in both the second and third divisions, with S.C. Olhanense and Portimonense SC.

From 1994 to January 1997, Edinho played in the Primeira Liga, scoring 29 goals combined for G.D. Chaves and Vitória de Guimarães. On 6 February he signed with English Football League First Division side Bradford City, netting ten times in 41 games in his first full season with the Bantams.

On 13 November 1998, Edinho moved to Dunfermline Athletic on loan. He made his debut for the club, starting a match and played 72 minutes before being substituted, in a 2-1 win against Dundee United. In a follow-up match, Edinho scored his only goal for Dunfermline Athletic, in a 2-1 loss against Hearts. However, he struggled to adapt in Scottish football and found his playing time reduced during his short spell.

After leaving Bradford, he returned to Portugal and continued to play in the country until his retirement one decade later (at the age of 42), only two of his ten seasons being spent in the second tier, with C.F. União de Lamas and Olhanense – in 2007–08, he even helped historic Algarve team S.C. Farense promote from the regional championships; in the two major levels combined, he amassed totals of 188 matches and 59 goals.

== Coaching career ==
As of June 2019 Edinho was coaching youth players at a Portuguese academy. That same month he played for the Bradford City veteran's team at a friendly tournament in the Algarve.

== Personal life ==
Edinho' son, Edinho Júnior, is also a footballer and a forward.
