= Paul Jewell =

Former professional association footballer and manager (born 1964)

Personal information
- Date of birth: 28 September 1964 (age 62)
- Place of birth: Liverpool, England
- Height: 5 ft 8 in (1.73 m)
- Position: Striker

Youth career
- 1982–1984: Liverpool

Senior career*
| Years | Team | Apps | (Gls) |
| 1984–1988 | Wigan Athletic | 137 | (35) |
| 1988–1998 | Bradford City | 269 | (56) |
| 1995 | → Grimsby Town (loan) | 5 | (1) |
| Total | | 411 | (92) |

Managerial career
- 1998–2000: Bradford City
- 2000–2001: Sheffield Wednesday
- 2001–2007: Wigan Athletic
- 2007–2008: Derby County
- 2011–2012: Ipswich Town
- * Club domestic league appearances and goals

Paul Jewell (born 28 September 1964) is an English football manager and former player, who was most recently director of football at Swindon Town.

Jewell began his playing career with Liverpool, continued at Wigan Athletic and concluded in a ten-year spell with Bradford City reserves, apart from a short loan spell with Grimsby Town. When his playing career ended, he became part of the coaching staff at Bradford City.

Jewell was appointed manager in 1998 and took City to the Premier League before resigning and becoming manager of Sheffield Wednesday. He returned to Wigan Athletic to win a second promotion to the Premier League, but resigned a day after he kept them up in the 2006–07 season. He later joined Derby County on 28 November 2007, before resigning 13 months later.

He was appointed manager of Ipswich Town in January 2011, but departed following an unsuccessful reign in October 2012. He briefly took up assistant coaching roles at West Brom in 2015 and Oldham Athletic in 2017 before being appointed as director of football at Swindon Town in December 2018. Jewell left Swindon in July 2021.

== Playing career ==
Born in Liverpool, Lancashire (now Merseyside), and educated at De La Salle School, Jewell began his career as an apprentice with home-city club Liverpool.

In December 1984, Jewell moved to Wigan Athletic for £15,000. He made his league debut for Wigan against Rotherham United in a 3–3 draw. He appeared 137 times for Wigan, scoring 35 goals, before moving to Bradford City in an £80,000 deal. Terry Dolan brought Jewell to Valley Parade in June 1988 as part of a re-building exercise after the club failed to win promotion to Division One in 1987–88 and had lost Stuart McCall and John Hendrie to Everton and Newcastle United, respectively. He spent a decade as a player at City scoring 56 league goals in 269 appearances, and forged a successful partnership with Sean McCarthy for four of those seasons. Jewell's most successful spell occurred in 1992–93 when he scored 16 league goals to McCarthy's 17 in the first season of new player-manager Frank Stapleton's tenure.

Jewell had a brief loan spell at Grimsby Town before returning to Bradford. He retired as a player in 1997–98 when Bradford won promotion from Division Two in 1995–96 under manager Chris Kamara.

== Managerial career ==
=== Bradford City ===
Jewell started his coaching career long before he retired as a player, joining City's coaching staff during the successful 1995–96 campaign. The following season City came 21st in Division One, avoiding relegation with a 3–0 victory on the final day of the season against Queens Park Rangers. A year later, with 13 points from a possible 15, City were top after five games. However, performances declined from there, and chairman Geoffrey Richmond sacked Kamara on 6 January 1998, three days after a 2–0 FA Cup defeat to Manchester City.

Richmond turned to Jewell, already Kamara's assistant manager, who then won his first game 2–1 to Stockport County. In his 21 games in charge, Jewell won six games and drew five to guide City to 13th, their highest position since Jewell had joined the club. He was rewarded with a permanent contract when others expected Richmond to recruit a higher-profile replacement. Richmond wanted to make a promotion challenge, so Jewell broke the club's transfer record twice within the first week of the 1998–99 season, first with the £1m acquisition of Lee Mills and then the £1.3m purchase of Arsenal youngster Isaiah Rankin. He also brought back Stuart McCall from Rangers. After a poor start, when City won just one of its first seven games, they picked up momentum and were second behind Sunderland for most of the latter half of the season. Jewell added Lee Sharpe on loan and a third £1m signing, Dean Windass, as City held off Ipswich Town and Birmingham City to finish second. With promotion to the Premier League, Bradford had returned to top-flight football after an absence of 77 years.

Bradford struggled in the Premiership during the 1999–2000 season, but their survival was secured on the last day when, against expectations, they beat Liverpool 1–0 at home, a defeat that cost their opponents a UEFA Champions League place. Jewell handed in his notice after Richmond called City's 17th-placed Premiership finish "a disappointment". Richmond refused to accept Jewell's resignation. He contended that Jewell had already lined up a job at Sheffield Wednesday whilst still contracted to City, and placed Jewell on gardening leave. However, Wednesday worked out a compensation package with City, and Jewell was installed as the new manager of the relegated club.

=== Sheffield Wednesday ===
Jewell had been hoping to mount a promotion challenge in 2000–01 with Wednesday but after enduring a torrid eight months in charge was sacked in February 2001 with the debt-ridden Hillsborough club struggling near the foot of Division One. His highlight was the 2–1 League Cup victory over local rivals Sheffield United and victory over Premier League club West Ham United.

=== Wigan Athletic ===
In June 2001, Jewell made his return to management with ambitious Division Two club Wigan Athletic. In his second season as manager (2002–03) the club won the Division Two championship and entered the upper half of the English professional football league system for the first time ever. They were near the top of Division One throughout the 2003–04 season but were pipped to a playoff place on the final day of the season by Crystal Palace—who went on to win the playoffs.

On the final day of the 2004–05 Championship season, Jewell's Athletic side clinched promotion to the Premier League bringing top-flight football to the Lancashire town for the first time. For the 2005–06 season, Jewell's side lost their first game at home to Chelsea via a last-minute winner from Hernán Crespo but won their first match two games later at home to Sunderland. They contested the League Cup final against Manchester United on 26 February 2006 but went down 4–0.

On 11 February 2007 during the aftermath of Wigan's defeat at the hands of Arsenal, Jewell accused referee Phil Dowd of failing to award Wigan a penalty and for allowing what appeared to be an offside goal. After the game Jewell was charged by the FA for improper conduct regarding his verbally insulting the referee. For this offence Jewell was fined £2,000 and given a two match touchline ban (suspended for 12 months). A second charge relating to the same referee was brought by the Football Association, heard on 16 May 2007, and was found not proven.

On the final day of the 2006–07 season, Jewell steered Wigan safe from relegation after a win against Sheffield United at Bramall Lane on 13 May 2007. A day later, Jewell resigned as Wigan manager for health reasons.

=== Derby County ===
After leaving Wigan, Jewell was linked with various vacant managerial positions at the start of the 2007–08 season. He was linked twice to Leicester City; to Wigan again, after his successor, Chris Hutchings, was sacked; and to the Republic of Ireland job. The rumours ceased on 28 November 2007 after he was unveiled as Derby County's new manager two days after the departure of Billy Davies. Jewell acquired former Birmingham City and Blackburn Rovers midfielder Robbie Savage, and former Manchester United and West Ham United goalkeeper Roy Carroll. His first win as manager came on penalties in an FA Cup game against Sheffield Wednesday. Four days later, they were knocked out of the competition to 22nd-placed Championship side Preston North End. His 16th game as Derby manager came at his former club Wigan Athletic on 23 February 2008 when a 2–0 defeat set a Derby club record of 21 league games without victory. In late March, Jewell was exposed for filming a sex tape on his Mercedes, licence plate JJB after Wigan's JJB Stadium.

Derby's relegation from the Premier League was confirmed on 29 March 2008 after a 2–2 draw with Fulham. The point gained from the draw was just Derby's 11th of the season. Derby finished the season with a record low of 11 points, and just one win, which was gained under Jewell's predecessor Billy Davies, equalling a 108-year Football League record. Jewell's first victory as Derby manager came in the second game of the 2008–09 season when a hat-trick from Nathan Ellington helped his side defeat Lincoln City 3–1 after extra time in the first round of the League Cup. He recorded his first league win as Derby manager after 10 months in the job when his side defeated Sheffield United 2–1 on 13 September 2008. Despite leading Derby to their first League Cup semi-final in 40 years by defeating Stoke City, newspapers continued to report Jewell's job was unsafe. He resigned after the final game of the 2008 calendar year after his side lost 1–0 to Ipswich Town, which left Derby in 18th place in the Championship table. For a third time, Jewell was replaced by his assistant manager Chris Hutchings, this time as caretaker manager.

=== Ipswich Town ===
Jewell was announced as Ipswich Town manager on 10 January 2011, and took up the post on a permanent basis three days later, replacing caretaker manager Ian McParland, after the 1–0 League Cup semi final first leg win against Arsenal. He was also joined by long time assistant manager Chris Hutchings. His first match was a 1–2 defeat away to Millwall. He won his next match as Ipswich manager, a 3–2 home win against Doncaster Rovers at Portman Road. His third match in charge of the team was the second leg of the League Cup semi final away against Arsenal at the Emirates Stadium, which Ipswich lost 0–3, resulting in a 1–3 aggregate loss over two legs. Jewell's first signing as Ipswich manager was the loan signing of his former player at Wigan Athletic Jimmy Bullard. Ipswich's form improved in the short term following Jewell's appointment, winning four of his first six league matches, including a 6–0 away win against Doncaster Rovers. Ipswich finished the season in 13th position in the Championship, two places above the previous seasons finish of 15th.

In the 2011 summer transfer window, Jewell signed a number of experienced players, with former England international Lee Bowyer and experienced striker Nathan Ellington joining on free transfers, as well as strikers Michael Chopra and Jay Emmanuel-Thomas signing for six figure fees. Ipswich started the 2011–12 season with a 3–0 away win against Bristol City, although the team then went on to lose the next three league games, including heavy defeats against Southampton and Peterborough United. An upturn in form followed with Ipswich winning five of their next eight league matches. Following this upturn in form saw Jewell's Ipswich lose seven games in a row, dropped Ipswich from 6th to 21st place. Ipswich next traveled to Barnsley where, in front of the Sky cameras, they won 5–3, coming from 2–0 down at half time. In the following match, Jewell celebrated his 550th game as a manager as Ipswich won 1–0 against his former club Derby County at Portman Road. Ipswich's inconsistent form continued into 2012, a 1–1 draw against Leicester City on boxing day started a six game win less run which was ended on 31st January as Ipswich defeated West Ham United 5–1 at Portman Road. This started a run of four consecutive wins and an upturn in form throughout February and March, however a poor run in March resulted in 1 win in the final six matches of the season and a 15th placed finish to the season. Ipswich also exited the FA Cup at the third round stage and the League Cup in the first round, failing to progress in either competition.

After a poor start to the 2012−13 season which saw Ipswich win only once in the first twelve league matches left the team bottom of the table after 12 games. Whilst Ipswich had also exited the League Cup against Carlisle United in the second round, following a first round win against Bristol Rovers. His last match in charge of Ipswich was a 1−2 defeat to former club Derby County on 23 October. Jewell left his post as Ipswich Town's manager on 24 October 2012 by mutual consent, with his assistant manager Chris Hutchings once again becoming caretaker manager.

=== Later career ===
Jewell was appointed as assistant manager at West Bromwich Albion in January 2015. However, he resigned after only one week, after reportedly refusing to take a pay cut. Two years later on 30 November 2017, Jewell was appointed as assistant manager of Oldham Athletic, but after just over one month in the role Jewell resigned.

On 11 December 2018, Jewell was appointed as director of football at Swindon Town. On 25 October 2019, Jewell was fined and handed a three-match stadium ban after using abusive/insulting language towards a match official during a game against Bradford City earlier in the month. On 26 June 2021, Jewell was reported to be leaving his role at Swindon Town, following the departure of manager John McGreal, his assistant, and the club's chief executive. This was confirmed a month later in July following the club's takeover, with Ben Chorley appointed in Jewell's place.

== Personal life ==
Jewell's family home is in Witney. He and his wife, Ann-Marie, have two children: a son, Sam, who is director of global recruitment at Premier League club Chelsea; and a daughter, Alex. His father was a trade union activist in Liverpool.

== Managerial statistics ==
As of 24 October 2012

Managerial record by team and tenure
| Team | From | To | Record | | | | |
| Team | From | To | P | W | D | L | Win % |
|---|---|---|---|---|---|---|---|
| Bradford City | 6 January 1998 | 18 June 2000 | 117 | 46 | 26 | 45 | 39.3 |
| Sheffield Wednesday | 21 June 2000 | 12 February 2001 | 38 | 12 | 5 | 21 | 31.6 |
| Wigan Athletic | 12 June 2001 | 14 May 2007 | 291 | 127 | 74 | 90 | 43.6 |
| Derby County | 28 November 2007 | 28 December 2008 | 58 | 12 | 15 | 31 | 20.7 |
| Ipswich Town | 13 January 2011 | 24 October 2012 | 85 | 29 | 18 | 38 | 34.1 |
| Total | | | 589 | 226 | 138 | 225 | 38.4 |

== Honours ==
=== Player ===
Wigan Athletic

- Associate Members' Cup: 1984–85

=== Manager ===
Bradford City

- Football League First Division runner-up: 1998–99

Wigan Athletic

- Football League Second Division: 2002–03
- Football League Championship runner-up: 2004–05
- Football League Cup runner-up: 2005–06

Individual

- LMA Second Division Manager of the Year: 2002–03
- Football League Championship Manager of the Month: August 2004, October 2004
- Premier League Manager of the Month: September 2005, October 2005
