= Geoffrey Richmond =

Football executive (1941–2026)

Geoffrey Richmond (March 1941 – 30 October 2026) was an English football executive who was chairman of Bradford City from 1994 to 2002, and previously chairman of Scarborough.

== Career ==
Richmond was born in March 1941, in Leeds, where he attended Roundhay Grammar School. After leaving school, he worked as a salesman, selling children's encyclopedias door-to-door, car bulbs and car bumper and window stickers, before initially retiring before the age of 40. He bought Ronson Lighters from the receivers for £250,000 before selling it in 1994 for £10 million.

He became chairman of Bradford City on 27 January 1994 when he and David Simpson switched positions, with Simpson moving to Scarborough. He immediately loaned Bradford £2.3 million to clear the club debts.

Richmond was at Bradford during their most successful times, including their first appearance at Wembley Stadium in the 1996 Second Division play-off final and their promotion to the Premier League in the 1998–99 season. He left after the club was relegated in 2001 and went into administration in 2002, having lost the confidence of the fans. The failure of the club was put down to heavy spending in the club's second season in the Premier League and the collapse of ITV Digital with the resulting loss of television rights. Richmond said: "I will never, ever, forgive myself for spending the money we did. Looking back now, it was six weeks of madness and I hold my hands up." He later added: "I went into my office on the following Monday and cleared my desk. As I drove away, I was in tears. It had been my life, and I have never been back since.

He was later linked with Notts County and Leeds United before being declared bankrupt in 2004. He owed £3.3 million to the Inland Revenue, for the sale of Ronson 10 years previously; the sum included £1 million in interest.

Richmond was also an advocate of the Phoenix League, a proposed second tier of the Premier League.

== Personal life and death ==
Richmond was married to Elizabeth. They had one son, Michael. Richmond also had an older son, David and two daughters, Dawn and Deborah from his first marriage to Barbara.

In July 2000, he was made a Doctor of Letters from the University of Bradford. Richmond was also chairman of New Rover Cricket Club, in Adel, Leeds.

Richmond died on 30 October 2026, aged 85.
