= 1997–98 Arsenal F.C. season =

English football club season

Arsenal
1997–98 season
- Chairman: Peter Hill-Wood
- Manager: Arsène Wenger
- Stadium: Highbury
- Premier League: 1st
- FA Cup: Winners
- Football League Cup: Semi-finals
- UEFA Cup: First round
- Top goalscorer: League: Dennis Bergkamp (16); All: Dennis Bergkamp (22)
- Highest home attendance: 38,269 (vs Everton, 3 May)
- Lowest home attendance: 37,164 (vs Crystal Palace, 15 February)
- Average home league attendance: 37,277
Home colours	Away colours

The 1997–98 season was Arsenal Football Club's sixth season in the Premier League and their 72nd consecutive season in the top flight of English football. In Arsène Wenger's first full season at the club, the Gunners won the league title for the first time in seven years. At Wembley Stadium, they beat Newcastle United 2–0 in the 1998 FA Cup Final to win the competition for the first time since 1993 and complete a domestic double – the second in the club's history and the first since 1970–71. Arsenal exited the League Cup in the semi-finals to Chelsea and lost on aggregate score to PAOK in the UEFA Cup first round.

In the transfer window, Arsenal purchased several players, including midfielders Marc Overmars and Emmanuel Petit and goalkeeper Alex Manninger; English midfielder Paul Merson departed to join Middlesbrough. Arsenal began the league season relatively well, but a run of three defeats in four matches between November and December 1997 left the team in sixth position before Christmas, and seemingly out of championship contention. Although they were 12 points behind reigning champions Manchester United at the end of February, a winning streak of ten matches ensured Arsenal won the championship with a 4–0 win over Everton on 3 May 1998.

In recognition of the team's achievement, Wenger was awarded the Carling Manager of the Year award and striker Dennis Bergkamp was given the accolade of PFA Players' Player of the Year by his fellow peers and FWA Footballer of the Year by football writers.

== Background ==
In the 1996–97 season, Arsenal contested in the Premier League. The club, having dismissed manager Bruce Rioch before the beginning of the league season, appointed French manager Arsène Wenger, in a contract worth £2 million. Arsenal led the league table for much of November, but defeat to Nottingham Forest on 21 December 1996 concurred with no wins in December. Two draws and defeats in February moved Arsenal into fourth position; a previous defeat to Liverpool at home a month earlier left Wenger ruling the club out of the title race. On the final day of the season, Arsenal beat Derby County 3–1 at the Baseball Ground, finishing third on goal difference. The team, thus, qualified for the UEFA Cup, missing out on UEFA Champions League qualification to second place Newcastle United.

=== Transfers ===
The major departure of the 1997–98 season for Arsenal was midfielder Paul Merson, who joined Middlesbrough in a £4.5 million deal, replacing Juninho. Wenger said of the move, "You are never happy to lose a player of his calibre but it is a good deal for him and for the club." Middlesbrough intended to sign David Platt, but a move never came to fruition, as talks broke down between both parties. Defender Matthew Rose and goalkeeper Lee Harper joined Queens Park Rangers for a combined fee of £750,000.

Arriving first during the summer was English defender Matthew Upson from Luton Town. French midfielders Emmanuel Petit and Gilles Grimandi joined from Monaco, where they were protégées to Wenger. Marc Overmars, a midfielder from Ajax, was recruited in a £7 million deal and spoke of his delight at joining Arsenal in his press conference: "I like English football because there is more space. With my speed and quality I think it will be good for me here." Deals for midfielders Luís Boa Morte and Alberto Méndez, striker Christopher Wreh and goalkeeper Alex Manninger were also finalised before August.

==== In ====
No.	Position	Player	Transferred from	Fee	Date	Ref
20	DF	Matthew Upson	Luton Town	£1.2M	10 May 1997	
18	DF	Gilles Grimandi	Monaco	£1.75M	4 June 1997	
21	MF	Luís Boa Morte	Sporting CP	£1.75M	14 June 1997	
23	MF	Alberto Méndez	1. SC Feucht	£250,000	17 June 1997	
11	MF	Marc Overmars	Ajax	£7.0M	1 July 1997	
17	MF	Emmanuel Petit	Monaco	£3.5M	1 July 1997	
13	GK	Alex Manninger	Grazer AK	£1.0M	3 July 1997	
12	FW	Christopher Wreh	Monaco	£300,000	7 August 1997	

==== Out ====
No.	Position	Player	Transferred to	Fee	Date	Ref
31	DF	Matthew Rose	Queens Park Rangers	£500,000	20 May 1997	
29	MF	Adrian Clarke	Southend United	Free	31 May 1997	
9	MF	Paul Merson	Middlesbrough	£4.5M	7 July 1997	
26	GK	Lee Harper	Queens Park Rangers	£250,000	9 July 1997	
27	MF	Paul Shaw	Millwall	£300,000	15 September 1997	
22	MF	Ian Selley	Fulham	£500,000	17 October 1997	
29	MF	Glenn Helder	NAC Breda	£150,000	24 October 1997	
36	MF	Jehad Muntasser	Bristol City	Free	30 January 1998	

== Pre-season ==
Key

- Green colour = Win
- Red colour = Loss

8 July 1997 Friendly	St Albans City	1–4	Arsenal	St Albans
19:30 BST	Martin 73'	Report	Grimandi 5'; Rankin (?); Shaw (?)

12 July 1997 Friendly	Leyton Orient	0–1	Arsenal	London
15:00 BST		Report	Shaw 4'	Stadium: Brisbane Road

20 July 1997 Friendly	Stade Nyonnais (Switzerland)	0–4	Arsenal	Nyon
		Report	Boa Morte 3'; Méndez (?); Overmars (?); Bergkamp (?)	Attendance: 1,400

25 July 1997 Friendly	Strasbourg (France)	1–2	Arsenal	Strasbourg
20:00 CEST	Zitelli 38'	Report	Garde 45'; Wright 54'	Stadium: Stade de la Meinau; Attendance: 12,000; Referee: M. Léon

30 July 1997 Nike Challenge Cup	PSV (Netherlands)	1–0	Arsenal	Eindhoven
19:30 CEST	Iwan 66'	Report		Stadium: Philips Stadion; Attendance: 15,000

2 August 1997 Friendly	Sittingbourne	2–5	Arsenal	Sittingbourne
	Planck 51'; Miller 74'	Report	Anelka 10', 43'; Boa Morte 26'; Kiwomya 45'; Hughes 47'	Stadium: Central Park; Attendance: 3,349

4 August 1997 Friendly	Norwich City	2–6	Arsenal	Norwich
19:45 BST	Eadie 64'; Adams 89'	Report	Wright 6', 28', 58'; Grimandi 15', 46'; Bergkamp 17'	Stadium: Carrow Road; Attendance: 10,950

== Premier League ==
=== August–October ===
Arsenal's league campaign started on 9 August 1997 with an away fixture at Leeds United. The match ended in a 1–1 draw; Ian Wright scored his first goal of the season, before a mix up in defence meant Leeds striker Jimmy Floyd Hasselbaink equalised for the home team. Two days later, Wright scored both goals in Arsenal's 2–0 win at home to Coventry City, leaving him one goal away from equalling Cliff Bastin's club goalscoring record. The following week, two goals from Dennis Bergkamp and a debut goal from Marc Overmars helped Arsenal to win at Southampton. In spite of Bergkamp scoring a hat-trick against Leicester City, Arsenal drew the match 3–3, having conceded a third in the sixth minute of stoppage time. A further draw, at home to rivals Tottenham Hotpsur, for whom defender Sol Campbell particularly impressed, meant Arsenal ended August in fifth position.

Wright scored his 179th goal for Arsenal against Bolton Wanderers and broke the club goal-scoring record with his first of three goals in a 4–1 win at Highbury. Manager Arsène Wenger praised the striker's achievement, adding "He is fantastic for the timing of his movement. It is so intelligent when he has not got the ball." Arsenal faced Chelsea at Stamford Bridge on 21 September 1997; at 2–2, a late goal by left-back Nigel Winterburn from 25 yards ended the home team's resistance, who went down to ten men after Frank Leboeuf was sent off. September ended with a third consecutive win, against West Ham United. Goals from Bergkamp, Wright and Overmars helped Arsenal move to the top of the league table, one point above champions Manchester United. The month ended with a 2–2 draw against Everton at Goodison Park; Wright and Overmars scored Arsenal's goals. October began with a 5–0 win at home to promoted Barnsley, but two goalless draws – first at Crystal Palace and then to Aston Villa - meant Manchester United moved a point ahead of Arsenal.

=== November–February ===
Arsenal's first fixture of November was against Derby County at the newly built Pride Park Stadium. Arsenal were awarded a penalty kick in the first half after Patrick Vieira was fouled by Lee Carsley; Wright hit the penalty, which ricocheted off the crossbar. Two goals by Paulo Wanchope and a late strike by Dean Sturridge condemned Arsenal to their first defeat of the league season. When Arsenal played Manchester United on 9 November, they needed a win to stay one point behind the league leaders. Wenger admitted in his pre-match comments that a second successive defeat would make it "difficult" for them to catch Manchester United, but not "impossible". Striker Nicolas Anelka, standing in for Bergkamp, scored his first goal for Arsenal and Vieira added a second, leaving goalkeeper Peter Schmeichel rattled. Although Teddy Sheringham scored twice for Manchester United to level the score, midfielder David Platt headed into the far corner with seven minutes left of the match to score the winner for Arsenal. Wenger said of the win: "This result is good for the English game because it will stimulate interest in the Premier League" and opposing manager Alex Ferguson half agreed: "A one-horse race is not good for the game." Arsenal failed to capitalise on the result, losing to Sheffield Wednesday and Liverpool in a period where the team were depleted due to injuries.

A goal from Wright against Newcastle United, his first in seven matches, was enough to earn victory away at St James' Park. Arsenal lost 1–3 to Blackburn Rovers the following week, denting their chances of closing the gap on leaders Manchester United. The match was overshadowed by Wright being booed off by supporters because of his performance, who responded by appearing "at the window of the east stand clad in vest and underpants haranguing the crowd." Arsenal began the Christmas period with a fixture against Wimbledon; the game was abandoned by referee Dermot Gallagher due to floodlight failure and rescheduled for a later date. On Boxing Day, an own goal by Steve Walsh helped Arsenal beat Leicester City 2–1 at Highbury. A draw at Tottenham Hotspur, who were welcoming the return of Jürgen Klinsmann, left Arsenal in sixth at the end of the calendar year, 12 points behind Manchester United.

In the first league match of 1998, Overmars scored twice to earn Arsenal a win against Leeds United. The team drew 2–2 at Coventry City a week later, losing more ground at the top of the table. January came to a conclusion with a 3–0 victory over Southampton, with all three goals scored in the space of seven minutes. A further two wins in February, at home to Chelsea and Crystal Palace, moved Arsenal into second place, nine points behind Manchester United, albeit having played two games less.

=== March–May ===
Arsenal dropped two points against West Ham United on 2 March with a goalless draw at Upton Park. The following match, they closed the gap to six points after Manchester United could also only manage to draw against West Ham, but dropped to third position. A goal from Christopher Wreh in the rescheduled match at Wimbledon was enough to move Arsenal into second and set up a title clash between themselves and Manchester United on 14 March 1998. The result, moreover, reopened betting after Manchester bookmaker Fred Done decided to pay out on punters who backed Manchester United. After numerous attempts to break the deadlock in the match, Arsenal scored with 15 minutes left of the match; Overmars latched onto a header by Anelka and managed to flick the ball beyond the goalkeeper. When asked which team was in the best position going into the final games of the season, Wenger told Sky Sports that United had a "small advantage" over the rest; Ferguson, however, warned that it would be "inevitable" for Arsenal to drop points. Two 1–0 wins, first at home to Sheffield Wednesday and then Bolton Wanderers, meant Arsenal kept an eighth successive clean sheet, a new league record.

Arsenal beat Newcastle United 3–1 to move within four points of Manchester United in early April. The return of Bergkamp from a three-match suspension helped Arsenal to trounce Blackburn Rovers; the team scored three goals in the space of the opening 14 minutes. Manchester United's failure to beat Newcastle United meant Arsenal went top of the league table after beating Wimbledon 5–0. Victory against Barnsley and then at home against Derby County four days later meant Arsenal needed one more win in their last home game to become league champions, regardless of Manchester United's results. Although Bergkamp was ruled out for the remainder of the season after sustaining an injury against Derby, Arsenal eased to a 4–0 win against Everton to become the first club other than Manchester United or Blackburn Rovers to win the Premier League. With a run of ten straight victories, a new record was set, and Wenger became the first non-British manager to lead a team to win the league championship. Arsenal lost their final two matches of the league season, both of which are played away from home, choosing to rest players for the upcoming FA Cup Final.

=== Match results ===
9 August 1997 1	Leeds United	1–1	Arsenal	Leeds
15:00 BST	Hasselbaink 42'; Bowyer (yellow card)	Report	Wright 35'; Garde (yellow card); Grimandi (yellow card); Vieira (yellow card); Petit (yellow card) 71'	Stadium: Elland Road; Attendance: 37,993; Referee: Dermot Gallagher (Oxfordshire)

11 August 1997 2	Arsenal	2–0	Coventry City	London
20:00 BST	Wright 29', 47'; Garde (yellow card)	Report	Shaw (yellow card); Williams (yellow card); Telfer (yellow card)	Stadium: Highbury; Attendance: 37,324; Referee: Keith Burge (Rhondda)

23 August 1997 3	Southampton	1–3	Arsenal	Southampton
15:00 BST	Maddison 25'; Monkou (yellow card)	Report	Overmars 20'; Bould (yellow card); Bergkamp 57', 79' (yellow card); Wright (yellow card)	Stadium: The Dell; Attendance: 15,246; Referee: David Elleray (London)

27 August 1997 4	Leicester City	3–3	Arsenal	Leicester
20:00 BST	Heskey 84'; Elliott (yellow card) (goal) 90'; Walsh 90'; Kaamark (yellow card); Lennon (yellow card); Prior (yellow card)	Report	9', 61', 90' (yellow card) Bergkamp; (yellow card) Bould; (yellow card) Parlour	Stadium: Filbert Street; Attendance: 21,089

30 August 1997 5	Arsenal	0–0	Tottenham Hotspur	London
15:00 BST	Bergkamp (yellow card); Bould (yellow card); Wright (yellow card)	Report	(yellow card) Campbell; (yellow card) Carr; (yellow card) Dominguez; (red card) 44' Edinburgh	Stadium: Highbury; Attendance: 38,102

13 September 1997 6	Arsenal	4–1	Bolton Wanderers	London
15:00 BST	Wright 20', 25', 81'; Parlour 44'; Vieira (yellow card)	Report	13' Thompson; (yellow card) Taggart	Stadium: Highbury; Attendance: 38,138

21 September 1997 7	Chelsea	2–3	Arsenal	London
16:00 BST	Poyet 40'; Zola 60'; Wise (yellow card); Leboeuf (red card) 67'	Report	45', 59' (yellow card) Bergkamp; 89' Winterburn; (yellow card) Bould; (yellow card) Grimandi	Stadium: Stamford Bridge; Attendance: 33,102

24 September 1997 8	Arsenal	4–0	West Ham United	London
20:00 BST	Bergkamp 12'; Overmars 39', 45'; Wright 42' (pen.)	Report	(yellow card) Dowie; (yellow card) Lampard; (yellow card) Lomas; (yellow card) Unsworth	Stadium: Highbury; Attendance: 38,102

27 September 1997 9	Everton	2–2	Arsenal	Liverpool
15:00	Ball 49'; Cadamarteri 56'	Report	32' Wright; 41' Overmars	Stadium: Goodison Park; Attendance: 35,457

4 October 1997 10	Arsenal	5–0	Barnsley	London
15:00 BST	Bergkamp 25', 32'; Parlour 45'; Platt 63'; Wright 76'	Report	(yellow card) Arjan de Zeeuw; (yellow card) Thompson	Stadium: Highbury; Attendance: 38,049

18 October 1997 11	Crystal Palace	0–0	Arsenal	London
15:00 BST	Linighan (yellow card)	Report	(yellow card) Bergkamp; (yellow card) Boa Morte; (yellow card) Grimandi; (yellow card) Vieira; (yellow card) Wright	Stadium: Selhurst Park; Attendance: 26,180

26 October 1997 12	Arsenal	0–0	Aston Villa	London
16:00 GMT	Bould (yellow card); Seaman (yellow card); Vieira (yellow card); Petit (red card) 83'	Report	(yellow card) Southgate	Stadium: Highbury; Attendance: 38,061

1 November 1997 13	Derby County	3–0	Arsenal	Derby
15:00 GMT	Wanchope (yellow card) (goal) 46', 65'; Sturridge 82'; Rowett (yellow card)	Report	(yellow card) Boa Morte; (yellow card) Bould; (yellow card) Winterburn	Stadium: Pride Park Stadium; Attendance: 30,004

9 November 1997 14	Arsenal	3–2	Manchester United	London
16:00 GMT	Anelka 7'; Vieira 27'; Platt (yellow card) (goal) 83'; Wright (yellow card)	Report	33', 41' Sheringham; (yellow card) P. Neville; (yellow card) Scholes	Stadium: Highbury; Attendance: 38,205

22 November 1997 15	Sheffield Wednesday	2–0	Arsenal	Sheffield
15:00 GMT	Booth 42'; Whittingham 86'; Atherton (yellow card); Nolan (yellow card)	Report	(yellow card) Adams; (yellow card) Grimandi; (yellow card) Platt	Stadium: Hillborough; Attendance: 34,373

30 November 1997 16	Arsenal	0–1	Liverpool	London
16:00 GMT	Adams (yellow card); Dixon (yellow card)	Report	55' McManaman; (yellow card) Bjørnebye; (yellow card) Matteo	Stadium: Highbury; Attendance: 38,094

6 December 1997 17	Newcastle United	0–1	Arsenal	Newcastle
15:00 GMT		Report	36' Wright; (yellow card) Adams; (yellow card) Petit	Stadium: St. James' Park; Attendance: 36,751

13 December 1997 18	Arsenal	1–3	Blackburn Rovers	London
15:00 GMT	Overmars 18'; Adams (yellow card); Bergkamp (yellow card); Parlour (yellow card); Wright (yellow card)	Report	57' Wilcox; 65' Gallacher; 89' Sherwood	Stadium: Highbury; Attendance: 38,147

22 December 1997 19	Wimbledon	v	Arsenal	London
--:--				Stadium: Selhurst Park
Note: Abandoned due to floodlight problems.

26 December 1997 20	Arsenal	2–1	Leicester City	London
12:00 GMT	Platt 36'; Walsh 56' (o.g.); Winterburn (yellow card)	Report	77' Lennon; (yellow card) Campbell; (yellow card) Elliott	Stadium: Highbury; Attendance: 38,023

28 December 1997 21	Tottenham Hotspur	1–1	Arsenal	London
19:45	Nielson 28'; Campbell (yellow card); Wilson (yellow card)	Report	62' Parlour; (yellow card) Bould; (yellow card) Keown	Stadium: White Hart Lane; Attendance: 29,610

10 January 1998 22	Arsenal	2–1	Leeds United	London
15:00 GMT	Overmars 60' 72'	Report	69' Hasselbaink; (yellow card) Halle; (yellow card) Maybury	Stadium: Highbury; Attendance: 38,018

17 January 1998 23	Coventry City	2–2	Arsenal	Coventry
19:45	Whelan (yellow card) (goal) 21'; Dublin 66' (pen.); Telfer (yellow card); Williams (red card) 79'	Report	50' Bergkamp; 57' Anelka; (yellow card) Grimandi; (yellow card) Parlour; (yellow card) (red card) 65' Vieira	Stadium: Highfield Road; Attendance: 22,864

31 January 1998 24	Arsenal	3–0	Southampton	London
15:00 GMT	Bergkamp 62' adams (yellow card) (goal) 67'; Anelka 67'; Platt (yellow card)	Report	(yellow card) Dodd; (yellow card) Hirst; (yellow card) Monkou; (yellow card) Richardson	Stadium: Highbury; Attendance: 38,056

8 February 1998 25	Arsenal	2–0	Chelsea	London
16:00 GMT	S. Hughes 4', 42'; Bergkamp (yellow card); Bould (yellow card); Parlour (yellow card)	Report	Di Matteo (yellow card); Leboeuf (yellow card); Vialli (yellow card); Wise (yellow card)	Stadium: Highbury; Attendance: 38,083

21 February 1998 26	Arsenal	1–0	Crystal Palace	London
15:00	Grimandi 49'; Anelka (yellow card); Dixon (yellow card); Platt (yellow card)	Report	(yellow card) Dyer; (yellow card) Fullarton (yellow card); Hreiðarsson; (yellow card) Roberts	Stadium: Highbury; Attendance: 38,094

2 March 1998 27	West Ham United	0–0	Arsenal	London
19:45		Report	(yellow card) Vieira	Stadium: Boleyn Ground; Attendance: 25,717

11 March 1998 19	Wimbledon	0–1	Arsenal	London
19:45	Perry (yellow card)	Report	21' Wreh	Stadium: Selhurst Park; Attendance: 22,291

14 March 1998 28	Manchester United	0–1	Arsenal	Manchester
11:15 GMT	(yellow card) G. Neville; (yellow card) Sheringham	Report	79' Overmars; (yellow card) Adams; (yellow card) Anelka; (yellow card) Dixon	Stadium: Old Trafford; Attendance: 55,174

28 March 1998 29	Arsenal	1–0	Sheffield Wednesday	London
15:00 GMT	Bergkamp 35'	Report	(yellow card) Atherton; (yellow card) Barrett	Stadium: Highbury; Attendance: 38,087

31 March 1998 30	Bolton Wanderers	0–1	Arsenal	Bolton
20:00	Cox (yellow card)	Report	47' Wreh; (yellow card) Bould; (yellow card) (red card) 65' Keown	Stadium: Reebok Stadium; Attendance: 25,000

11 April 1998 31	Arsenal	3–1	Newcastle United	London
15:00 BST	Anelka 41', 64'; Vieira 72'	Report	(yellow card) Albert; (yellow card) Barton 79'	Stadium: Highbury; Attendance: 38,102

13 April 1998 32	Blackburn Rovers	1–4	Arsenal	Blackburn
20:00 BST	Gallacher 51'	Report	2' Bergkamp; 7', 14' Parlour; 42' Anelka; (yellow card) Garde; (yellow card) Petit; (yellow card) Vieira	Stadium: Ewood Park; Attendance: 28,212

18 April 1998 33	Arsenal	5–0	Wimbledon	London
15:00 BST	Adams 12'; Overmars 17'; Bergkamp 19'; Petit 54'; Wreh 88'	Report	(yellow card) Hughes	Stadium: Highbury; Attendance: 38,024

25 April 1998 34	Barnsley	0–2	Arsenal	Barnsley
15:00 BST	Ward (yellow card)	Report	23' Bergkamp; 76' Overmars; (yellow card) Petit; (yellow card) Winterburn	Stadium: Oakwell; Attendance: 18,691

29 April 1998 35	Arsenal	1–0	Derby County	London
20:00	Petit 34'; Parlour (yellow card)	Report	(yellow card) Carsley; Dailly; (yellow card) Delap; (yellow card) Sturridge; (yellow card) Wanchope	Stadium: Highbury; Attendance: 38,121

3 May 1998 36	Arsenal	4–0	Everton	London
16:00 BST	Bilić 6' (o.g.); Overmars 28', 57'; Adams 89'; Dixon (yellow card)	Report	(yellow card) Barmby; (yellow card) Ferguson; (yellow card) Hutchison; (yellow card) O'Kane; (yellow card) Oster	Stadium: Highbury; Attendance: 38,269

6 May 1998 37	Liverpool	4–0	Arsenal	Liverpool
19:45	Ince 28', 30'; Owen 40'; Leonhardsen 87'	Report		Stadium: Anfield; Attendance: 44,417

10 May 1998 38	Aston Villa	1–0	Arsenal	Birmingham
16:00 GMT	Yorke 37' (pen.); Draper (yellow card); Ehiogu (yellow card); Ehiogu (red card) 24'	Report	(yellow card) Grimandi; (yellow card) Vieira; (yellow card) Wright	Stadium: Villa Park; Attendance: 39,372

=== League table ===
Pos	Team	Pld	W	D	L	GF	GA	GD	Pts	Qualification or relegation
1	Arsenal (C)	38	23	9	6	68	33	+35	78	Qualification for the Champions League group stage
2	Manchester United	38	23	8	7	73	26	+47	77	Qualification for the Champions League second qualifying round
3	Liverpool	38	18	11	9	68	42	+26	65	Qualification for the UEFA Cup first round
4	Chelsea	38	20	3	15	71	43	+28	63	Qualification for the Cup Winners' Cup first round (Note: Chelsea qualified for the Cup Winners' Cup as defending champions. As they were also the League Cup winners, the UEFA Cup berth vacated was awarded to Blackburn Rovers.)
5	Leeds United	38	17	8	13	57	46	+11	59	Qualification for the UEFA Cup first round (Note: Aston Villa was rewarded entry to the UEFA Cup through UEFA Fair Play ranking.)

Source: Premier League
Rules for classification: 1) points; 2) goal difference; 3) number of goals scored.
(C) Champions

==== Results summary ====
Overall								Home						Away					
Pld	W	D	L	GF	GA	GD	Pts	W	D	L	GF	GA	GD	W	D	L	GF	GA	GD
38	23	9	6	68	33	+35	78	15	2	2	43	10	+33	8	7	4	25	23	+2

==== Results by round ====
Round	1	2	3	4	5	6	7	8	9	10	11	12	13	14	15	16	17	18	19	20	21	22	23	24	25	26	27	28	29	30	31	32	33	34	35	36	37	38
Ground	A	H	A	A	H	H	A	H	A	H	A	H	A	H	A	H	A	H	A	H	A	H	A	H	H	H	A	A	H	A	H	A	H	A	H	H	A	A
Result	D	W	W	D	D	W	W	W	D	W	D	D	L	W	L	L	W	L	W	W	D	W	D	W	W	D	W	W	W	W	W	W	W	W	W	W	L	L
Position	8	1	2	3	5	4	2	1	1	1	1	2	2	2	3	5	4	5	6	6	5	5	5	5	2	2	2	2	2	2	2	2	1	1	1	1	1	1

A = Away; H = Home; W = Win; D = Draw; L = Loss

== FA Cup ==
Arsenal entered the competition in the third round, receiving a bye as a Premier League club. Their opening match was a goalless draw against First Division club Port Vale at home, meaning the game was replayed at Vale Park eleven days later. Arsenal won the replay 4–3 in a penalty shoot-out, having drawn 1–1 in extra time. In the fourth round, Arsenal played Middlesbrough at the Riverside Stadium. Overmars scored the opening goal inside 68 seconds for the visitors and Parlour added a second to give Arsenal a commanding lead going into the interval. Although Paul Merson scored in the second half for Middlesbrough, Arsenal did enough to progress into the fifth round. A 0–0 draw at home against Crystal Palace meant Arsenal needed to play a fifth round replay at Selhurst Park on 25 February. Goals from Anelka and Bergkamp ensured victory for an under-strength Arsenal team. Against West Ham United in the quarter-finals, Arsenal conceded the first goal when Frank Lampard's corner kick was converted into the goal net by Ian Pearce through a first-time shot. Although Bergkamp scored a penalty to equalise, Arsenal had to settle for a replay at Upton Park, which ended 4–3 on penalties after another draw. A goal from Wreh against Wolverhampton Wanderers in the semi-finals meant Arsenal reached their 13th FA Cup final.

On 16 May 1998, Arsenal contested the 1998 FA Cup Final against Newcastle United. Without first-choice striker Bergkamp, Wenger partnered Anelka with Wreh, leaving Wright on the substitutes bench. Arsenal scored in the 23rd minute; Overmars sprinted onto a pass from Petit, and used his pace to get past Alessandro Pistone and toe-poke the ball between goalkeeper Shay Given's legs. Anelka scored in the second half, from a pass by Parlour to settle the match. In his post-match interview, Wenger praised the "remarkable" Overmars: "[It is] even more so when you realise that he has scored so many goals in important games that we needed to win."

3 January 1998 Third round	Arsenal	0–0	Port Vale	Highbury
15:00		Report	Corden (yellow card); Porter (yellow card); Snijders (yellow card); Talbot (yellow card)	Attendance: 37,471; Referee: Paul Alcock (Kent)

14 January 1998 Third round replay	Port Vale	1–1 (3–4 p)	Arsenal	Vale Park
19:45	Corden 112'; Tankard (yellow card)	Report	Bergkamp 100'	Attendance: 14,964; Referee: Neale Barry (North Lincolnshire)
	Penalties
	Porter (penalty scored); Ainsworth (penalty scored); Bogie (penalty missed); Snijders (penalty scored); Tankard (penalty missed)		Dixon (penalty missed); Parlour (penalty scored); Bergkamp (penalty scored); Boa Morte (penalty scored); S. Hughes (penalty scored)

24 January 1998 Fourth round	Middlesbrough	1–2	Arsenal	Middlesbrough
19:45	Baker (yellow card) 37'; Festa (yellow card) 38'; Merson 62'	Report	Overmars 2'; Parlour 19'	Stadium: Riverside Stadium; Attendance: 28,264; Referee: Mike Riley (West Yorkshire)

15 February 1998 Fifth round	Arsenal	0–0	Crystal Palace	London
14:00	Manninger (yellow card)	Report	Dyer (yellow card)	Stadium: Highbury; Attendance: 37,164; Referee: Martin Bodenham (Cornwall)

25 February 1998 Fifth round replay	Crystal Palace	1–2	Arsenal	London
19:45	Gordon (red card) 26'; Dyer 35', (yellow card) 38'; Ismaël (yellow card) 64'	Report	Anelka 2'; Bergkamp 28', (yellow card) 39'; Platt (yellow card) 37'; Keown (yellow card) 38'; Upson (yellow card) 66'	Stadium: Selhurst Park; Attendance: 15,674; Referee: Martin Bodenham (Cornwall)

8 March 1998 Sixth round	Arsenal	1–1	West Ham United	London
14:00	Bergkamp 26' (pen.)	Report	Pearce 12'; Potts (yellow card) 21'; Lomas (yellow card) 23'; Lampard (yellow card) 82'	Stadium: Highbury; Attendance: 38,077; Referee: Mike Reed (Birmingham)

17 March 1998 Sixth round replay	West Ham United	1–1 (a.e.t.) (3–4 p)	Arsenal	London
19:45	Abou (yellow card) 40'; Hartson 84'; Lomas (yellow card) 119'	Report	Bergkamp (red card) 32'; Anelka 45'; Garde (yellow card) 51'; Boa Morte (yellow card) 100'; S. Hughes (yellow card) 102'; Winterburn (yellow card) 111'	Stadium: Upton Park; Attendance: 25,859; Referee: Mike Reed (Birmingham)
	Penalties
	Unsworth (penalty scored); Hartson (penalty missed); Lampard (penalty scored); Berkovic (penalty missed); Lomas (penalty scored); Abou (penalty missed)		Hughes (penalty scored); Wreh (penalty missed); Boa Morte (penalty scored); Garde (penalty missed); Vieira (penalty scored); Adams (penalty scored)

5 April 1998 Semi-final	Wolverhampton Wanderers	0–1	Arsenal	Birmingham
12:00	Williams (yellow card) 88'	Report	Wreh 12'; Grimandi (yellow card) 37'; Parlour (yellow card) 54'	Stadium: Villa Park; Attendance: 39.372; Referee: Stephen Lodge (South Yorkshire)

16 May 1998 Final	Arsenal	2–0	Newcastle United	London
15:00	Overmars 23'; Winterburn (yellow card) 51'; Anelka 69'	Report	Shearer (yellow card) 45'; Barton (yellow card) 48'; Howey (yellow card) 53'; Dabizas (yellow card) 70'	Stadium: Wembley Stadium; Attendance: 79,813; Referee: Paul Durkin (Dorset)

== League Cup ==
Arsenal entered the Football League Cup in the third round along with the other clubs playing in European football, and were drawn at home to First Division club Birmingham City. The tie ended 1–1 after normal time; goals from Luís Boa Morte, Platt and Alberto Méndez helped Arsenal win 4–1 in extra time. They needed extra time the following round to beat Coventry City, and in the fifth round, beat West Ham United 2–1 at Upton Park. Arsenal exited the competition in the semi-finals, losing 4–3 on aggregate to Chelsea.

14 October 1997 Third round	Arsenal	4–1 (a.e.t.)	Birmingham City	London
19:45	Boa Morte 62', 108'; Platt 99' (pen.); Méndez 113'; Dixon (yellow card); Marshall (yellow card); Upson (yellow card); Crowe (red card) 91'	Report	Hey 20'; Grainger (yellow card); Ndlovu (yellow card); Wassall (red card) 83'	Stadium: Highbury; Attendance: 27,097; Referee: Uriah Rennie (South Yorkshire)

18 November 1997 Fourth round	Arsenal	1–0 (a.e.t.)	Coventry City	London
19:45	Bergkamp 99'	Report	Burrows (yellow card); Haworth (yellow card); Shaw (yellow card); Williams (yellow card)	Stadium: Highbury; Attendance: 30,199; Referee: Gerald Ashby (Worcestershire)

6 January 1998 Quarter-final	West Ham United	1–2	Arsenal	London
19:45	Abou 75'; Ferdinand (yellow card); Unsworth (yellow card)	Report	Wright 25'; Overmars 52'; Grimandi (yellow card); Petit (yellow card); Vieira (yellow card); Winterburn (yellow card)	Stadium: Upton Park; Attendance: 24,770; Referee: Graham Barber (Hertfordshire)

28 January 1998 Semi-final, first leg	Arsenal	2–1	Chelsea	London
19:45	Overmars 23'; S. Hughes 47'; Bergkamp (yellow card); Grimandi (yellow card)	Report	M. Hughes 68'; Duberry (yellow card); Le Saux (yellow card); Newton (yellow card)	Stadium: Highbury; Attendance: 38,114; Referee: Martin Bodenham (Cornwall)

18 February 1998 Semi-final, second leg	Chelsea	3–1 (4–3 agg.)	Arsenal	London
19:45	M. Hughes 10'; Di Matteo 51'; Petrescu 53'; Clarke (yellow card); Duberry (yellow card); M. Hughes (yellow card); Wise (yellow card)	Report	Adams (yellow card); Dixon (yellow card); Parlour (yellow card); Vieira (yellow card) 48' (red card); Petit (yellow card) 75'; Bergkamp 82' (pen.)	Stadium: Stamford Bridge; Attendance: 34,330; Referee: Graham Poll (Hertfordshire)

== UEFA Cup ==
Arsenal entered the UEFA Cup first round, having finished third in the league the previous season. They were drawn to play PAOK, a Greek club noted for hooligan problems. Arsenal lost the first leg 1–0 at the Toumba Stadium, with midfielder Kostas Frantzeskos scoring the winner. Although Bergkamp levelled the game on aggregate score 22 minutes into the second leg, a late goal scored by Zisis Vryzas meant Arsenal did not progress past the first round for the second successive season. Wenger later commented that he was not too unhappy about the team's exit, by saying "To be honest, the only European competition that really interests me is the Champions League".

16 September 1997 First leg	PAOK (Greece)	1–0	(England) Arsenal	Thessaloniki
20:45 EEST	Tasiopoulos (yellow card) 19'; Frantzeskos 61'; Zoumpoulis (yellow card) 71'; Zafeiriou (yellow card) 78'; Zagorakis (yellow card) 87'	Report	Wright (yellow card) 30'; Adams (yellow card) 69'; Vieira (yellow card) 89'	Stadium: Toumba Stadium; Attendance: 42,000; Referee: Manuel Díaz Vega (Spain)

30 September 1997 Second leg	Arsenal (England)	1–1 (1–2 agg.)	(Greece) PAOK	London
20:00 BST	Bergkamp 22'; Dixon (yellow card) 23'; Adams (yellow card) 65'	Report	Vryzas 87'; Tasiopoulos (yellow card) 37'; Sidiropoulos (yellow card) 74'	Stadium: Highbury; Attendance: 37,982; Referee: Michel Piraux (Belgium)

== Awards ==
In recognition of the team's achievement, Wenger was awarded the Carling Manager of the Year award, saying he was "very proud and honoured" after collecting the prize. Bergkamp was given the accolade of PFA Players' Player of the Year by his fellow peers and FWA Footballer of the Year by football writers.

== Player statistics ==
Numbers in parentheses denote appearances as substitute.
Players with name struck through and marked † left the club during the playing season.

No.	Pos.	Nat.	Name	Premier League		FA Cup		League Cup		UEFA Cup		Total		Discipline	
No.	Pos.	Nat.	Name	Apps	Goals	Apps	Goals	Apps	Goals	Apps	Goals	Apps	Goals	A yellow rectangular card	A red rectangular card
1	GK	ENG	David Seaman	31	0	4	0	1	0	2	0	38	0	1	0
2	DF	ENG	Lee Dixon	26 (2)	0	7	0	3	0	2	0	38 (2)	0	8	0
3	DF	ENG	Nigel Winterburn	35 (1)	1	8	0	3	0	2	0	48 (1)	1	5	0
4	MF	FRA	Patrick Vieira	31 (2)	2	8 (1)	0	2	0	2	0	43 (3)	2	10	2
5	DF	ENG	Steve Bould	21 (3)	0	4 (1)	0	3	0	2	0	30 (4)	0	9	0
6	DF	ENG	Tony Adams	26	3	6	0	2	0	2	0	36	3	7	0
7	MF	ENG	David Platt	11 (20)	3	1 (3)	0	2 (2)	1	(2)	0	14 (27)	4	5	0
8	FW	ENG	Ian Wright	22 (2)	10	1	0	1	1	2	0	26 (2)	11	7	0
9	FW	FRA	Nicolas Anelka	16 (10)	6	8 (1)	3	3	0	1 (1)	0	28 (12)	9	2	0
10	FW	NED	Dennis Bergkamp	28	16	7	3	4	2	1	1	40	22	9	1
11	MF	NED	Marc Overmars	32	12	8 (1)	2	3	2	2	0	45 (1)	16	0	0
12	FW	LBR	Christopher Wreh	7 (9)	3	2 (4)	1	1(2)	0	(1)	0	10 (16)	4	0	0
13	GK	AUT	Alex Manninger	7	0	5	0	4	0	0	0	16	0	1	0
14	DF	ENG	Martin Keown	18	0	7	0	2	0	0	0	27	0	4	1
15	MF	ENG	Ray Parlour	34	5	7	1	4	0	2	0	47	6	7	0
17	MF	FRA	Emmanuel Petit	32	2	7	0	3	0	2	0	44	2	6	1
18	DF	FRA	Gilles Grimandi	16 (6)	1	3 (2)	0	4	0	0	0	23 (8)	1	9	0
19	DF	FRA	Rémi Garde	6 (4)	0	1	0	0	0	0	0	7 (4)	0	4	0
20	DF	ENG	Matthew Upson	5	0	1	0	2	0	0	0	8	0	1	0
21	MF	POR	Luís Boa Morte	4 (11)	0	1 (3)	0	1	2	(1)	0	6 (15)	2	3	0
23	MF	GER	Alberto Méndez	1 (2)	0	0	0	2	1	0	0	3 (2)	1	0	0
25	DF	SCO	Scott Marshall	1 (2)	0	0	0	1 (1)	0	0	0	2 (3)	1	0	0
28	MF	ENG	Stephen Hughes	7 (10)	2	3 (3)	0	3 (2)	1	0	0	13 (15)	3	1	0
30	DF	ENG	Gavin McGowan	(1)	0	0	0	0	0	0	0	(1)	0	0	0
32	FW	ENG	Isaiah Rankin	(1)	0	0	0	0	0	0	0	(1)	0	0	0
34	DF	ENG	Jason Crowe	0	0	(1)	0	(1)	0	0	0	(2)	0	0	0
35	MF	ENG	Paolo Vernazza	1	0	0	0	1	0	0	0	2	0	0	0
~~36~~	MF	LBY	Jehad Muntasser †	0	0	0	0	(1)	0	0	0	(1)	0	0	0

== See also ==
- 1997–98 in English football
- List of Arsenal F.C. seasons
