= 2001 FA Cup final =

English football match

- The match programme cover.
- Event: 2000–01 FA Cup
Arsenal	Liverpool
1	2
- Date: 12 May 2001
- Venue: Millennium Stadium, Cardiff
- Man of the Match: Michael Owen (Liverpool)
- Referee: Steve Dunn (Gloucestershire)
- Attendance: 72,500
- Weather: Clear; 24 °C (75 °F)

The 2001 FA Cup final was a football match between Arsenal and Liverpool on 12 May 2001 at the Millennium Stadium, Cardiff. It was the final match of the 2000–01 FA Cup, the 120th season of the world's oldest football knockout competition, the FA Cup, and the first in the competition's history to be staged outside England, due to the ongoing reconstruction of its usual venue, Wembley Stadium. Arsenal appeared in their fourteenth final to Liverpool's twelfth.

Given both teams were in the highest tier of English football, the Premier League, they entered the competition in the third round. Each needed to progress through five rounds to reach the final. Arsenal's progress was relatively comfortable; after scoring six past Queens Park Rangers, they knocked out holders Chelsea in the fifth round and later came from behind to beat local rivals Tottenham Hotspur in the semi-final. Liverpool by contrast made hard work of overcoming lower-league opponents Tranmere Rovers and Wycombe Wanderers in the latter rounds of the competition. The final marked the first time that two managers born outside the British Isles had met in an FA Cup final – French compatriots Arsène Wenger and Gérard Houllier.

The match followed a familiar pattern of Arsenal dictating the pace and creating chances, but failing to breach the Liverpool defence. Arsenal had a penalty appeal turned down in the first half, when defender Stéphane Henchoz was judged not to have handled the ball to deny Thierry Henry a goalscoring opportunity. Henchoz's partner Sami Hyypiä made a series of goalline clearances during the second half, but was helpless to stop Arsenal taking the lead in the 72nd minute. Liverpool responded by making changes and equalised in the 83rd minute; Arsenal's failure to deal with a free-kick presented Michael Owen the chance to score. Owen then outpaced Lee Dixon and Tony Adams to score his second and the match winner, two minutes before the end of normal time. Liverpool's victory marked the second part of their unique treble of the 2000–01 season: they had won the League Cup in late February and added the UEFA Cup four days later.

As of 2026, this is the most recent time Arsenal have lost an FA Cup final, having won their next 7 appearances in a row. (2002, 2003, 2005, 2014, 2015, 2017, 2020)

== Route to the final ==
The FA Cup is English football's primary cup competition. Clubs in the Premier League enter the FA Cup in the third round and are drawn randomly out of a hat with the remaining clubs. If a match is drawn, a replay comes into force, ordinarily at the ground of the team who were away for the first game. As with league fixtures, FA Cup matches are subject to change in the event of games being selected for television coverage and this often can be influenced by clashes with other competitions. This was the first season that The Football Association introduced guidelines to prevent the withdrawal of clubs from the competition. The final was scheduled a week before the final weekend of the Premier League, to aid any successful club playing European football.

=== Arsenal ===
Round	Opposition	Score
3rd	Carlisle United (a)	1–0
4th	Queens Park Rangers (a)	6–0
5th	Chelsea (h)	3–1
6th	Blackburn Rovers (h)	3–0
Semi-final	Tottenham Hotspur (n)	2–1
Key: (h) = Home venue; (a) = Away venue; (n) = Neutral venue.

Arsenal entered the competition in the third round and their cup run started with an away tie against Carlisle United. Although the home side created numerous chances in the opening minutes and looked likeliest to score, Arsenal took the lead in the 22nd minute through Sylvain Wiltord. Poor finishing from both teams thereafter meant Arsenal progressed by a slender scoreline. In the fourth round, Arsenal faced Queens Park Rangers at Loftus Road. The visitors' first goal came around the half-hour mark; defender Ashley Cole cleared Peter Crouch's goal-bound header and from that Arsenal launched a counterattack. Lee Dixon's cross inadvertently met Chris Plummer who scored an own goal. Wiltord extended Arsenal's lead a minute later, and QPR conceded another own goal early in the second half which sealed the tie in the visitors' favour. Arsenal finished as comfortable 6–0 winners, representing the club's best away win in the FA Cup for 64 years.

In the fifth round, Arsenal played the cup holders Chelsea at home. Throughout the tie, Arsenal's centre-back partnership of Oleh Luzhnyi and Igors Stepanovs struggled against the pace of Jimmy Floyd Hasselbaink, who equalised for Chelsea after Thierry Henry gave the home side the lead. Wiltord replaced Robert Pires in the second half and scored twice to settle the match. In the sixth round, Arsenal enjoyed a comfortable win against Blackburn Rovers of the First Division, where Wiltord continued his run scoring in each round of the competition.

Arsenal faced Tottenham Hotspur in the semi-final and it was their local rivals who had taken the lead in the 14th minute. Patrick Vieira equalised just after Tottenham captain Sol Campbell was taken off the pitch to receive treatment. Tottenham managed to withstand pressure from Arsenal for most of the second half, but came unstuck in the 73rd minute when Pires scored the decisive goal.

=== Liverpool ===
Round	Opposition	Score
3rd	Rotherham United (h)	3–0
4th	Leeds United (a)	2–0
5th	Manchester City (h)	4–2
6th	Tranmere Rovers (a)	4–2
Semi-final	Wycombe Wanderers (n)	2–1
Key: (h) = Home venue; (a) = Away venue; (n) = Neutral venue.

Liverpool entered the competition in the third round, where they were drawn against Second Division side Rotherham United at home. Igor Bišćan was sent off in the tie for a second bookable offence, moments after Emile Heskey had scored. Dietmar Hamann extended Liverpool's lead in the 73rd minute and a further goal by Heskey ensured their progress in the competition.

Liverpool's opponent in the fourth round was Leeds United. The match was played at Elland Road on 27 January 2001 in front of a near-capacity crowd of 37,108. The home team enjoyed much of the possession, but struggled to find a breakthrough as Liverpool's defence stood firm. Two minutes before full-time, Barmby, on as a substitute, scored the winning goal, rebounding a shot that came off the post. Barmby then turned provider for Liverpool's second, setting-up Heskey to score.

Anfield hosted Manchester City in the fifth round. It was the start of a decisive week for Liverpool, as they faced Roma midweek in the UEFA Cup, then Birmingham City in the 2001 Football League Cup final. Liverpool were awarded a penalty after five minutes, as goalkeeper Nicky Weaver fouled Vladimír Šmicer inside the 18-yard box. Jari Litmanen converted the spot kick to give Liverpool the lead, which quickly became 2–0 when Heskey's shot found its way past Weaver. Andrei Kanchelskis' goal in the 28th minute halved the scoreline, but Šmicer and Markus Babbel each scored in the second half to put Liverpool in a commanding lead. City persisted and in stoppage time scored their second goal of the match; Shaun Goater's deflected shot did enough to beat goalkeeper Sander Westerveld.

Liverpool travelled to Prenton Park to play Tranmere Rovers in the sixth round. Danny Murphy and Michael Owen each scored in a first half in which the visitors dominated play. Steve Yates pulled a goal back for Tranmere after half-time, but in the 52nd minute Steven Gerrard headed-in a cross to restore Liverpool's two-goal advantage. A mistake by Robbie Fowler gifted substitute Wayne Allison the chance to score, but the striker made amends as he converted a penalty kick in the 81st minute. In the semi-final, Liverpool faced Wycombe Wanderers at Villa Park. Goals from Heskey and Fowler and a consolation scored by Wycombe's captain Keith Ryan ensured Liverpool won 2–1 and earnt a place in the final.

== Pre-match ==
=== Stadium changes ===
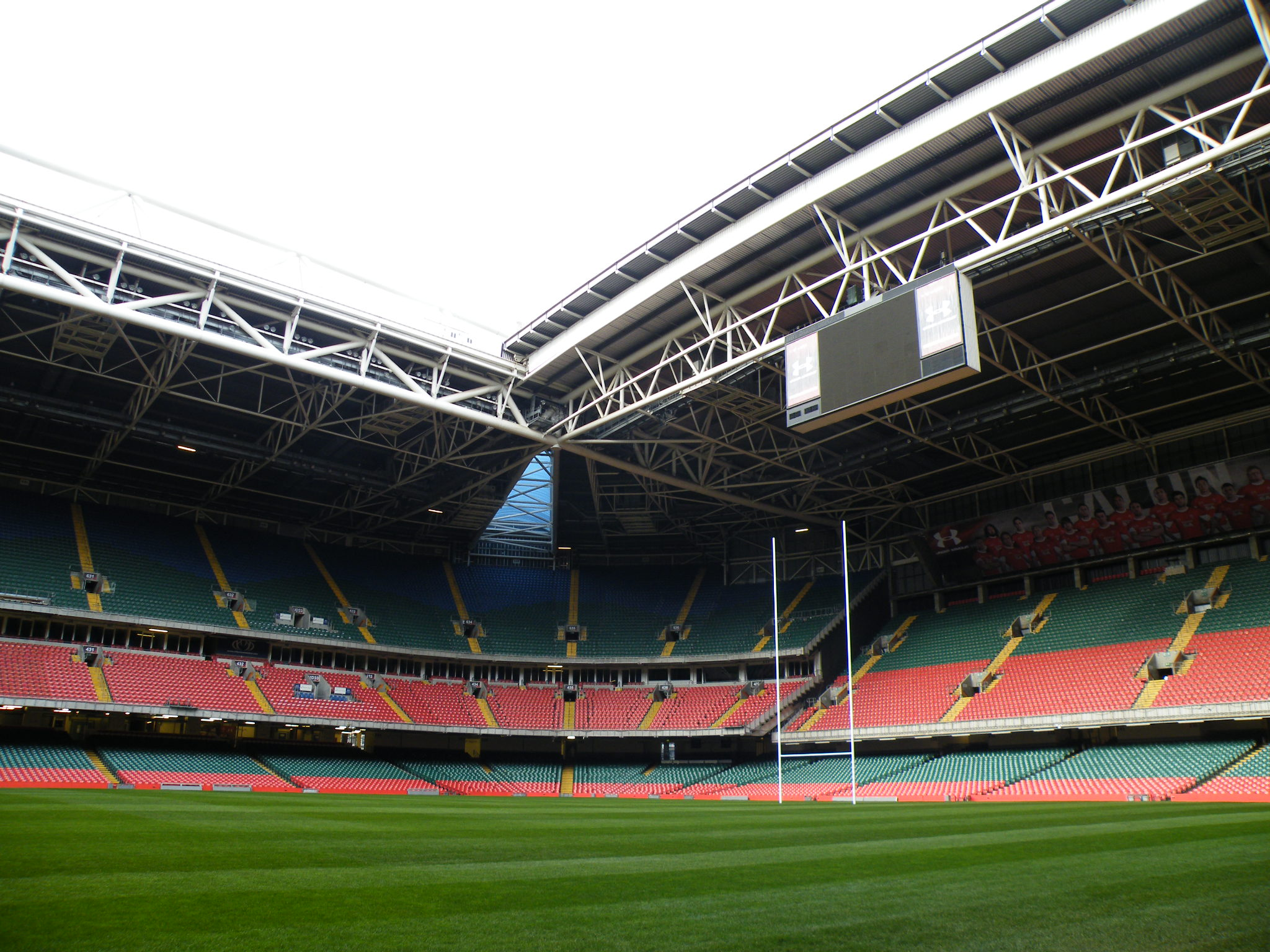
In addition to hosting the FA Cup Final, the Millennium Stadium acted as the venue for the Charity Shield, and all major Football League trophy and play-off finals.

In October 2000, Wembley Stadium, the final's traditional venue, was closed in anticipation of major redevelopment. Having considered alternative venues such as Twickenham, Murrayfield and Villa Park, the FA announced in January 2001 that the next three Cup finals would be staged at Cardiff's Millennium Stadium. This therefore marked the first time the showpiece event was held outside England. In the lead-up to the final, FA chief executive Adam Crozier acknowledged concerns over transport and the quality of the pitch, saying, "We've done a lot of work with Cardiff and hopefully it will be a great occasion, but we'll take a view about how it's worked after the final and decide whether to still hold the match there." A new pitch was re-laid in May, and the police made attempts to ease traffic on the M4 by opening three more turn-offs than they did for the League Cup final.

The finalists received a total allocation of approximately 52,000 tickets, which was an estimated increase of 10% on previous Wembley finals. Seat prices for the final exceeded £70, though some ticket touts charged as much as £1,000. The cheapest tickets cost £20; the rest were priced at £40 and £55.

=== Build-up ===
Arsenal were appearing in the final of the FA Cup for the 14th time, their first in over three years. They had won the cup seven times previously (in 1930, 1936, 1950, 1971, 1979, 1993 and 1998) and were beaten in the final six times. By comparison, Liverpool were making their 12th appearance in a FA Cup final. The club won the cup five times (in 1965, 1974, 1986, 1989, 1992) and lost six finals, most recent of which against Manchester United in 1996. Arsenal and Liverpool had previously met thirteen times in the FA Cup, including four replays. Arsenal had a slender advantage in those meetings, winning five times to Liverpool's four. Both clubs were involved in the longest ever semi-final in FA Cup history in 1980, which required three replays after the original tie ended goalless. Brian Talbot's goal at Highfield Road earnt Arsenal a 1–0 victory.

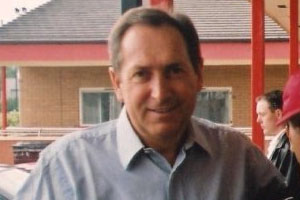
Liverpool manager Gérard Houllier was on course to win multiple trophies in the 2000–01 season.

The last meeting between the two teams had been in the Premier League on 23 December 2000. Liverpool recorded a 4–0 win at Anfield, their third-straight victory in all competitions. Gérard Houllier, the manager of Liverpool, enjoyed success in the cup competitions during the 2000–01 season; under his management, the club ended their six-year spell without silverware by winning the League Cup, and in the calendar year defeated Roma, Porto and Barcelona to reach the 2001 UEFA Cup final. Houllier was indifferent that his side were considered the underdogs in the FA Cup final, and told reporters, "We have great work ethic and team ethic. There is a great desire to achieve something as a club." He confirmed in his pre-match press conference that Heskey would start the final, though had yet to make a final decision over who would partner the England forward.

Arsenal manager Arsène Wenger admitted his team had underachieved during the season, but took criticism of failing to challenge Manchester United in the league and progressing further in the UEFA Champions League as a "compliment to the club". He spoke in favour of moving FA Cup ties midweek to prevent fixture congestion, because the current system was too demanding for the big clubs: "In England a team that goes for the FA Cup automatically has a problem in the championship, especially if they play in the Champions League. There are then so many games something has to be sacrificed and I have sacrificed points in the championship to the FA Cup." When asked whether reducing the number of teams in the UEFA Champions League would help, Wenger commented it "... would mean less money and no one with the wages we pay can accept a drop in income. As for cutting the Premiership – they have done that in France and now those teams not involved in the cups are complaining."

The match attracted considerable media interest because of the number of foreigners involved. It marked the first time that the two managers of opposing sides were born outside the British Isles, and it was anticipated the final would receive a large overseas audience because of the inclusion of several international players. Broadcast in 70 countries, viewing figures for the match totalled close to 600 million.

== Match ==
=== Summary ===
Both clubs lined up in a traditional 4–4–2 formation: a four-man defence (comprising two centre-backs and left and right full-backs), four midfielders (two in the centre, and one on each wing) and two centre forwards. Wenger opted to pair Gilles Grimandi with Vieira in midfield and Wiltord up front with Henry, leaving Bergkamp on the substitutes' bench. Ashley Cole played in defence, ahead of Sylvinho, who did not feature in the matchday squad. For Liverpool, Houllier named Owen in the starting line-up, and chose Šmicer and Murphy to play in midfield. Gary McAllister, Patrik Berger and Fowler began the final as substitutes.

Arsenal in their usual home strip of red shirts and white shorts kicked off the match and immediately won a corner, which was dealt with by Westerveld. A run by Heskey six minutes later resulted in the player taking a tumble under Gilles Grimandi's challenge, but his appeals for a penalty were ignored by referee Dunn. Arsenal began to dominate play, with Vieira at the heart of their best moves. The midfielder won a challenge with Heskey in the 17th minute and sent the ball in the direction of Freddie Ljungberg, who in turn passed it to Henry. The Frenchman went around Westerveld and shot the ball goalwards, which was cleared off the line by Stéphane Henchoz. Television replays later showed the ball hitting Henchoz's arm before going wide; although Henry appealed for a penalty, it was turned down as the incident was missed by both the referee and his assistant. Owen came close to scoring in the 20th minute, but for his shot to be blocked by Martin Keown. Arsenal continued to find the best openings, but struggled to split open the Liverpool defence. A long range effort by Grimandi was easily saved by Westerveld as the final approached the half-hour mark, and a duel between Wiltord and Jamie Carragher on the right side resulted in a Liverpool corner. Two minutes before the interval Henry was penalised for drifting into an offside position, having collected a long pass.

Liverpool resumed play and won a free-kick in the 48th minute; Murphy's delivery found Heskey, whose header forced a save from David Seaman. Arsenal enjoyed their best spell of the match soon afterwards, but failed to make use of their set-pieces. A free-kick taken by Pires was easily handled by Westerveld, and nothing came out of the resulting corner. Pires and Henry combined in attack for Arsenal and the latter came close to scoring, had the Liverpool goalkeeper not intervened. The ball rebounded to Cole who shot goalwards, but Sami Hyypiä cleared off the line. Hamann was shown a yellow card for fouling Vieira in the 57th minute, and Houllier responded by replacing him with McAllister four minutes later. The change had the desired effect as it brought composure to Liverpool's play, particularly in midfield. In the 62nd minute Ljungberg received a yellow card for a challenge on Šmicer. Arsenal squandered another chance, this time two minutes before the 70; Henry outpaced Henchoz and his rebounded shot found Ljungberg in the penalty area. The midfielder's effort, a chip over the advancing Westerveld, was cleared off the line by Hyypiä.

With 19 minutes left, Arsenal finally scored. A poor clearance by Westerveld fell to Grimandi, who passed the ball to Pires. Ljungberg received it and rounded the goalkeeper to score, much to Wenger's delight. Henry missed a chance to give Arsenal a two-goal lead in the 74th minute, as his shot was point-blank saved by Westerveld and on the follow-up cleared by Hyypiä. Both managers made changes in the final period of the game; Ray Parlour came on for Wiltord in order to protect Arsenal's lead, whereas Liverpool made an attacking double substitution – Fowler and Berger on for Šmicer and Murphy. Liverpool survived the onslaught and found a foothold in the game when Owen equalised with eight minutes left. Arsenal failed to clear substitute McAllister's free-kick, and Owen pounced with a right-foot finish past Seaman from eight yards. Liverpool's comeback was completed six minutes later in the 88th minute, with extra time looming; Owen was released down the left by a weighted long ball pass from Berger, with the type of vision which had been earlier missing from their play, and he outpaced both Tony Adams and Dixon before shooting low and accurately past Seaman, beating him at the far post. Liverpool held on to their lead for the few minutes remaining to win the final.

=== Details ===
12 May 2001
15:00 BST

Arsenal	1–2	Liverpool
Ljungberg 72'	Report	Owen 83', 88'

Millennium Stadium, Cardiff
Attendance: 72,500
Referee: Steve Dunn (Gloucestershire)

Arsenal	Liverpool

GK	1	(England) David Seaman
RB	2	(England) Lee Dixon		(substituted off) 90'
CB	5	(England) Martin Keown
CB	6	(England) Tony Adams (c)
LB	29	(England) Ashley Cole
RM	8	(Sweden) Freddie Ljungberg	(yellow card) 62'	(substituted off) 85'
CM	18	(France) Gilles Grimandi
CM	4	(France) Patrick Vieira
LM	7	(France) Robert Pires
CF	11	(France) Sylvain Wiltord		(substituted off) 76'
CF	14	(France) Thierry Henry
Substitutes:
GK	13	(Austria) Alex Manninger
DF	12	(Cameroon) Lauren
MF	15	(England) Ray Parlour		(substituted on) 76'
FW	10	(Netherlands) Dennis Bergkamp		(substituted on) 90'
FW	25	(Nigeria) Nwankwo Kanu		(substituted on) 85'
Manager:
(France) Arsène Wenger

GK	1	(Netherlands) Sander Westerveld
RB	6	(Germany) Markus Babbel
CB	12	(Finland) Sami Hyypiä (c)
CB	2	(Switzerland) Stéphane Henchoz
LB	23	(England) Jamie Carragher
RM	13	(England) Danny Murphy		(substituted off) 77'
CM	17	(England) Steven Gerrard
CM	16	(Germany) Dietmar Hamann	(yellow card) 57'	(substituted off) 60'
LM	7	(Czech Republic) Vladimír Šmicer		(substituted off) 77'
CF	8	(England) Emile Heskey
CF	10	(England) Michael Owen
Substitutes:
GK	19	(France) Pegguy Arphexad
DF	27	(France) Grégory Vignal
MF	15	(Czech Republic) Patrik Berger		(substituted on) 77'
MF	21	(Scotland) Gary McAllister		(substituted on) 60'
FW	9	(England) Robbie Fowler		(substituted on) 77'
Manager:
(France) Gérard Houllier

Match rules

- 90 minutes.
- 30 minutes of extra-time if necessary.
- Penalty shootout if scores still level.
- Five named substitutes
- Maximum of 3 substitutions.

=== Statistics ===
Statistic	Arsenal	Liverpool
Goals scored	1	2
Possession	47%	53%
Shots on target	7	4
Shots off target	4	2
Corner kicks	4	5
Offsides	6	2
Fouls	18	17
Yellow cards	1	1
Red cards	0	0

== Post-match and aftermath ==
Houllier was disappointed with Liverpool's start and noticed his players struggled with the humidity. He nevertheless saw set-pieces as an opportunity to score goals from and felt the equaliser turned the final in his team's favour: "Suddenly the confidence switches to the other camp. They're affected, they become a bit unsettled, and you keep going." Houllier revealed he gave a frank assessment of the task facing his players before the match; although in his words Arsenal were "... probably a bit better than us, probably more mature, more experienced, more ability in some areas", dealing with setbacks would make the difference on the day. He dismissed accusations that Liverpool were boring, rather describing his team as difficult to beat. Owen, the match winner, felt he answered his critics by scoring left-footed: "It's nice to prove people wrong when they say you haven't got a left foot. I was supposed to be the worst header and the worst player with my left foot in the league, and how could an England player play when they haven't got a left foot. ... It does go to show that I have improved and I am improving."

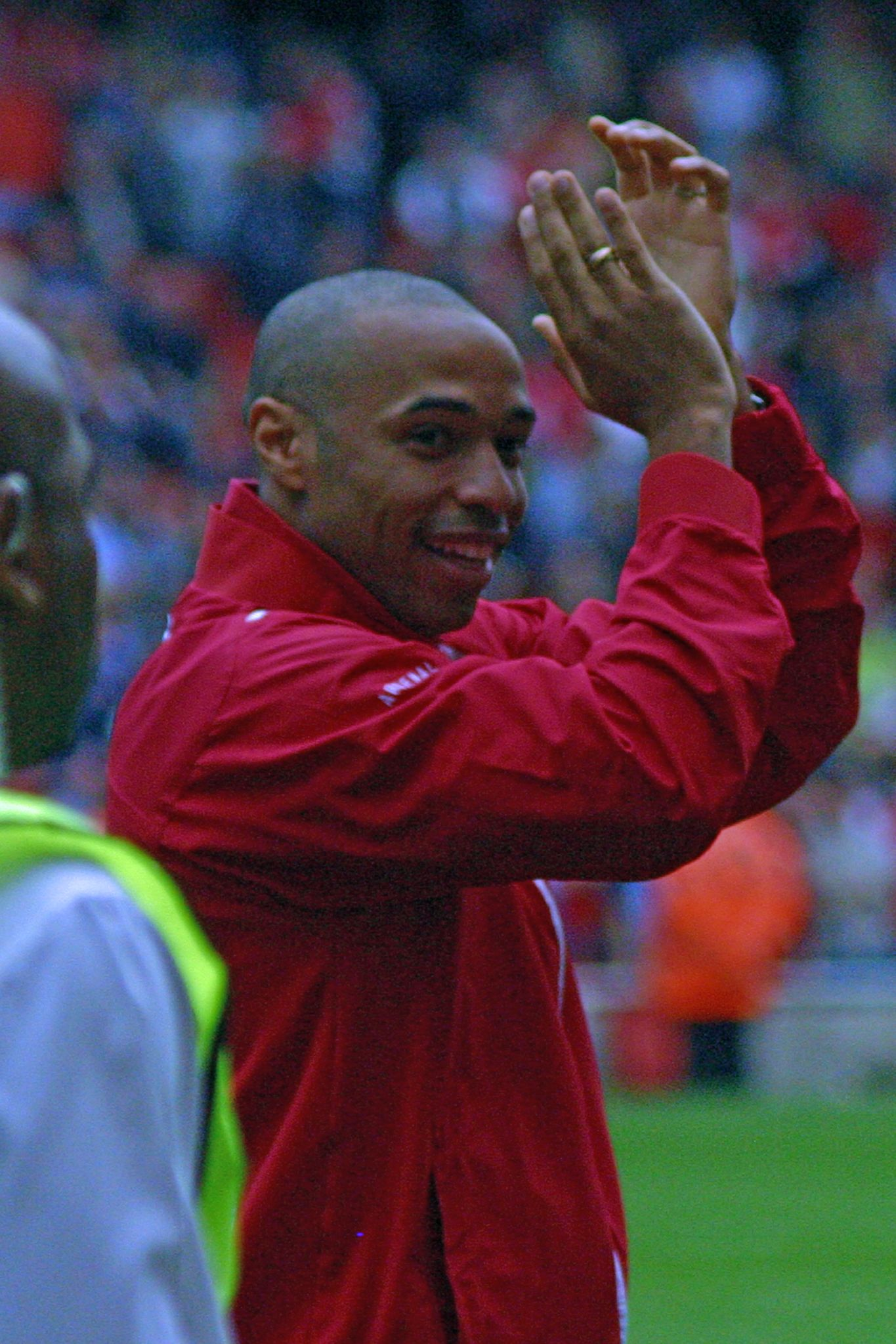
Thierry Henry's performance received mixed reviews by the British press.

Wenger lamented Arsenal's inability to make possession count, saying: "It has happened all season. We don't finish." He criticised the referee for not sending off Henchoz, especially as linesman Kevin Pike told him the Liverpool defender had committed a foul. On reflection of the season, Wenger disagreed it was one of failure – "It is not easy to get to the quarter-finals of the Champions League, the final of the FA Cup and to finish in the top three of the Premiership in the same season", but admitted he needed to make signings to strengthen the squad. Henry called for changes to Arsenal's forward line and felt the team would benefit from a "fox in the box", a player who would stay in and around the penalty area to score. "When I make wide runs and put in crosses there is often no-one there to put the ball in the net. Owen was the hero because he is always in the right place. We need a goalscorer like that", he concluded.

"On some occasions the will to win is more important than the skill to win."

— Gérard Houllier speaking after the game

Journalists and pundits reviewing the final praised Liverpool's tenacity; radio commentator Alan Green wrote in his News Letter column of 14 May 2001: "Simply, they never give up and when you have a player like Michael Owen within your ranks you believe that any situation can be rescued, as it was in the magnificent Millennium Stadium." The Guardian correspondent David Lacey declared "The Owen of France '98 was reborn in Cardiff," while Hugh McIlvanney of The Sunday Times called Owen "the master executioner of English football." McIlvanney felt over the 90 minutes the Arsenal team were "unlucky to lose", lauding Vieira's show in midfield. James Lawton's match report in The Independent was not as empathetic; although in praise of Henry's performance his indecision compared to Owen, demonstrated how "effect, not style, is everything" in football. Clive White of The Herald criticised Henry's lack of end product, using the final and Arsenal's European failure against Valencia to demonstrate how he would never be considered a "natural goalscorer". Ron Atkinson, writing in his tactics column for The Guardian noted Liverpool's winning goal only came about because of Arsenal's eagerness to attack, which left gaps in defence.

The final was broadcast live in the United Kingdom by both ITV and Sky Sports, with the former providing free-to-air coverage and Sky Sports 2 being the pay-TV alternative. ITV held the majority of the viewership, with an overnight peak audience of 7.8 million viewers. Four days after the final Liverpool beat Alavés by five goals to four, to win the UEFA Cup and complete a treble of cup victories. Victory against Charlton Athletic on 20 May 2001 ensured Liverpool finished third in the Premier League and with that earn a place in the 2001–02 UEFA Champions League. Arsenal ended the season as league runners-up; a draw against Newcastle United was enough for them to secure second spot.

In his autobiography released a few years later, Gerrard reflected that Liverpool were fortunate to win, but was critical of Arsenal's "bitter" reaction: "Wenger and Ljungberg kept complaining about the hand-balls. Get real, boys. That's football. Grow up." He reserved special praise for his opponent Vieira however, saying a few days after the game: "It was my job to try and stop him, but he definitely got the better of me that day. He's such a great player. He's so fit, and he dictates the pace of a game. There are a lot of things you can learn just by watching him." Assessing his career in a column for the Telegraph, Owen wrote that winning the cup was "...the best day of my career, the game I look back on more than any other and think it was the most exhilarating experience I ever had playing football."

== See also ==
- 2001 Football League Cup final
- 2001 FA Trophy final
