= Nelson Vivas =

Argentine footballer and manager (born 1969)

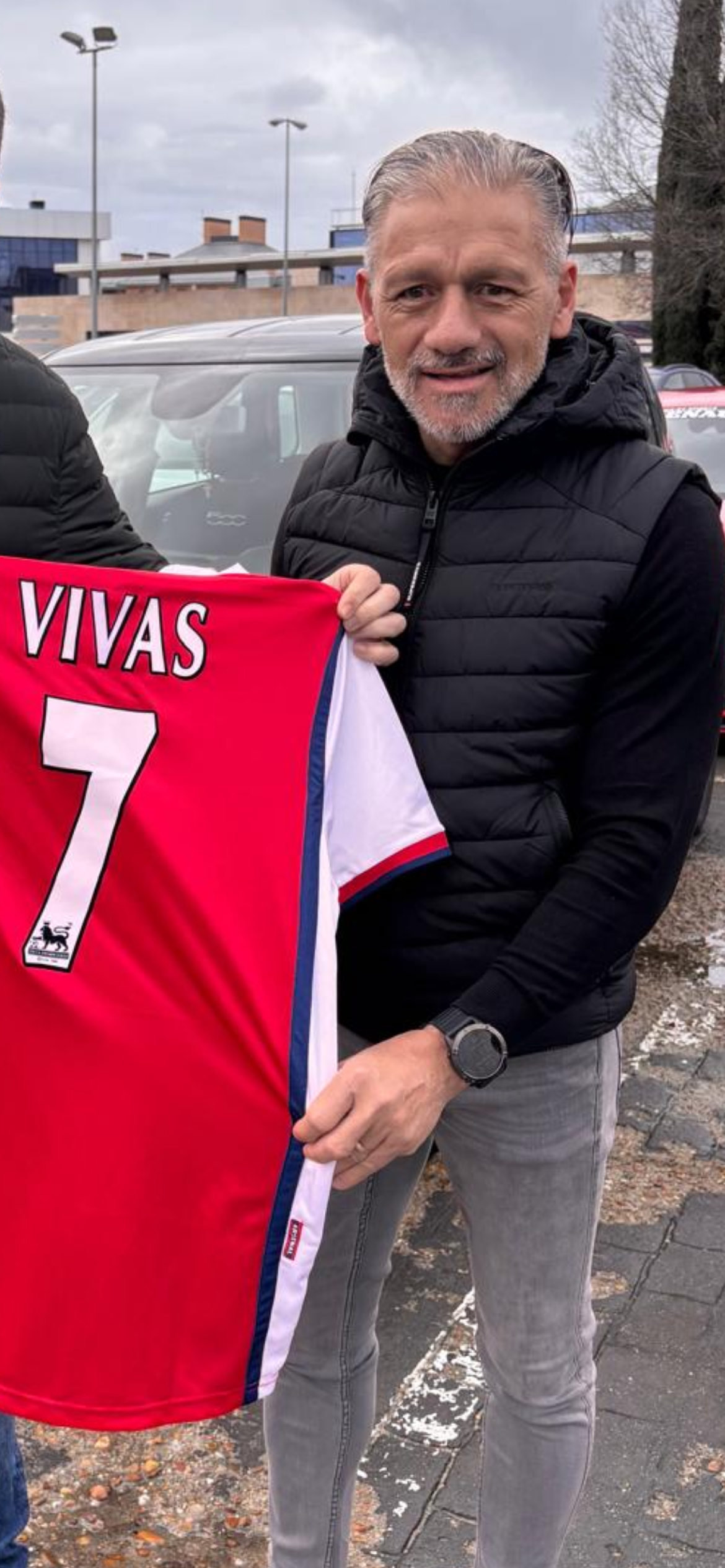
- Nelson Vivas in 2025

Personal information
- Full name: Davíd Vivas
- Date of birth: 18 October 1969 (age 57)
- Place of birth: Granadero Baigorria, Argentina
- Height: 1.76 m (5 ft 9 in)
- Position: Right-back

Team information
- Current team: Atlético Madrid (assistant coach)

Youth career
- 1989–1990: Somisa de San Nicolas

Senior career*
Years	Team	Apps	(Gls)
1990–1994	Quilmes	93	(3)
1994–1997	Boca Juniors	86	(3)
1998	→ Lugano (loan)	22	(1)
1998–2001	Arsenal	40	(0)
2000	→ Celta Vigo (loan)	13	(0)
2001–2003	Inter Milan	19	(0)
2003	River Plate	7	(0)
2004–2005	Quilmes	24	(0)
Total		275	(7)

International career
1994–2003	Argentina	39	(1)

Managerial career
- 2013: Quilmes
- 2015–2017: Estudiantes
- 2017: Defensa y Justicia
- * Club domestic league appearances and goals

Nelson David Vivas (born 18 October 1969) is an Argentine professional football manager and former player who played as a right-back. He is assistant coach of La Liga club Atlético Madrid.

Vivas played for Quilmes, Boca Juniors and River Plate in his native Argentina, Swiss club Lugano, Arsenal in the Premier League, Spanish outfit Celta Vigo and Italian Serie A side Inter Milan. He also played for the Argentina national team.

Vivas has gone on to manage sides Quilmes, Estudiantes and Defensa y Justicia.

== Club career ==
=== Career in Argentina ===
Vivas was born in Granadero Baigorria, Santa Fe, Argentina. He began his professional footballing career with Quilmes. After three years with Quilmes, he then joined Boca Juniors. Vivas in all played 98 games and scored three goals for Azul y Oro.

=== Move to Europe ===
Vivas then made his move to Europe, joining Lugano of the Swiss League on loan. He went on to make ten appearances during his stay at the club. Arsenal eventually signed him from Boca Juniors for £1,600,000 in August 1998.

Vivas was at first used as backup for established full-backs Lee Dixon and Nigel Winterburn while at Arsenal. He started 18 games and played as a substitute for another 18 matches during his debut season at Highbury. Vivas scored his first and only goal for the Gunners against Derby County in the League Cup. He had a setback when he missed a penalty in a shootout as Arsenal crashed out of the 1999/2000 League Cup to Middlesbrough.

Vivas was loaned out to the La Liga outfit Celta Vigo halfway through the 1999–00 season. As Arsenal had signed Oleh Luzhnyi and Sylvinho in the summer of 1999, he went on to mainly appear as a substitute at the club. With him being unable to attain regular playing time, Vivas left Arsenal at the end of the 2000–01 season. Altogether he played 69 games for Arsenal, with 40 as a substitute, scoring one goal. Vivas then joined Serie A team Inter Milan on a free transfer. At Inter, Vivas found it hard to break into the first team. After two seasons with the Nerazzurri, he left European football to return to his native Argentina.

=== Early retirement ===
Vivas went on to sign up for River Plate where he spent a solitary season. He then made a return to Quilmes, where he brought an end to his playing days in 2005.

Vivas served as Diego Simeone's assistant manager at clubs Estudiantes, River Plate and San Lorenzo.

For the 2013–14 season, Vivas once again returned to Quilmes, as manager on this occasion. International headlines were made in October 2013 when Vivas attacked a fan in the stands, and subsequently resigned from his post.

== International career ==
As a solid defender, Vivas was a regular for the Argentina national team. He went on to play for La Albiceleste at the 1995 and 1997 Copa America together with the 1998 World Cup. Vivas played 39 games and scored on one occasion for Argentina altogether.

== Career statistics ==
=== International ===
Appearances and goals by national team and year
National team	Year	Apps	Goals
Argentina	1994	1	0
Argentina	1995	1	0
Argentina	1996	2	0
Argentina	1997	5	0
Argentina	1998	8	1
Argentina	1999	7	0
Argentina	2000	6	0
Argentina	2001	6	0
Argentina	2002	1	0
Argentina	2003	2	0
Argentina	Total	39	1

== Honours ==
=== Player ===
Arsenal

- FA Charity Shield: 1998, 1999
- Premier League runner-up: 1998-99, 1999-2000, 2000-01
- FA Cup runner-up: 2000-01

Celta Vigo

- UEFA Intertoto Cup: 2000

River Plate

- Primera División: 2003

=== Manager ===
Argentina Manager of the Year: 2017
