= 1998 FA Cup final =

English football match

- The match programme cover
- Event: 1997–98 FA Cup
Arsenal	Newcastle United
2	0
- Date: 16 May 1998
- Venue: Wembley Stadium, London
- Man of the Match: Ray Parlour
- Referee: Paul Durkin (Dorset)
- Attendance: 79,183

The 1998 FA Cup final was a football match between Arsenal and Newcastle United on 16 May 1998 at the old Wembley Stadium, London. It was the final match of the 1997–98 FA Cup, the 117th season of the world's oldest football knockout competition, the FA Cup. Six-time winners Arsenal were appearing in their thirteenth final, whereas Newcastle United, having also won the competition six times, appeared in their eleventh final. It was the third time the teams had faced each other in a FA Cup final; Newcastle won the previous two encounters in 1932 and 1952.

Each team had progressed through five rounds to reach the final. Arsenal's victories were close affairs and the team required three replays, two of which ended in penalty shootouts. Newcastle's progress was more comfortable, and they needed only one replay in the fourth round, against Stevenage Borough. Arsenal entered the match as favourites; a fortnight earlier, they had won the Premier League and they aimed to complete the club's second league and cup double.

Watched by a stadium crowd of 79,183 and a British television audience of more than seven million, Arsenal took a first-half lead through Marc Overmars. Newcastle's performance improved in the second half, and striker Alan Shearer almost equalised when his shot hit the inside of David Seaman's post. Moments later the league champions extended their lead when Nicolas Anelka was put through to score. Arsenal's victory was heralded by the English press, and the club capped off its memorable season with an open-top bus parade. It was Arsène Wenger's first FA Cup triumph as a coach; he went on to win six more finals in a 22-year spell at the club to become the competition's most successful manager.

== Route to the final ==
The FA Cup is English football's primary cup competition. Clubs in the Premier League enter the FA Cup in the third round and are drawn randomly out of a hat with the remaining clubs. If a match is drawn, a replay comes into force, ordinarily at the ground of the team who were away for the first game. As with league fixtures, FA Cup matches are subject to change in the event of games being selected for television coverage and this often can be influenced by clashes with other competitions.

=== Arsenal ===
Round	Opposition	Score
3rd	Port Vale (h)	0–0
3rd	Port Vale (a)	1–1
4th	Middlesbrough (a)	2–1
5th	Crystal Palace (h)	0–0
5th	Crystal Palace (a)	2–1
6th	West Ham United (h)	1–1
6th	West Ham United (a)	1–1
Semi-final	Wolves (n)	1–0
Key: (h) = Home venue; (a) = Away venue; (n) = Neutral venue.

Arsenal entered the competition in the third round, and their opening match was against First Division club Port Vale at Highbury. It ended a goalless draw and the match was replayed at Vale Park. Neither side managed to find a winning goal after normal and extra time, meaning the tie headed into a penalty shoot-out. Arsenal won out 4–3; Allen Tankard missed the decisive penalty kick for Port Vale. In the fourth round, Arsenal played Middlesbrough at the Riverside Stadium. The visitors began strongly as Marc Overmars scored the opener inside 68 seconds, and his teammate Ray Parlour added a second to give Arsenal a commanding lead going into the interval. Although Paul Merson scored in the second half for Middlesbrough and they pushed for an equaliser, Arsenal held out for a 2–1 win.

In the fifth round Arsenal faced Crystal Palace at home, but once again had to settle for a replay as the team were held to a draw. Arsenal fielded a makeshift side at Selhurst Park, but goals from Nicolas Anelka and Dennis Bergkamp ensured progress into the next round. Against West Ham United in the quarter-finals, Arsenal went a goal behind as Frank Lampard's corner kick was converted into the goal net by Ian Pearce. Although Bergkamp equalised from the penalty spot, West Ham defended well enough to force a replay.

At Upton Park, Bergkamp was sent off in the first half for elbowing West Ham captain Steve Lomas in the face. Anelka put Arsenal in front, but John Hartson equalised for the hosts late on. The tie was eventually settled on penalties, which ended 4–3 in Arsenal's favour. A goal by Christopher Wreh against Wolverhampton Wanderers in the semi-final was enough for Arsenal to win the match and reach the final.

=== Newcastle United ===
Round	Opposition	Score
3rd	Everton (a)	1–0
4th	Stevenage Borough (a)	1–1
4th	Stevenage Borough (h)	2–1
5th	Tranmere Rovers (h)	1–0
6th	Barnsley (h)	3–1
Semi-final	Sheffield United (n)	1–0
Key: (h) = Home venue; (a) = Away venue; (n) = Neutral venue.

Newcastle's FA Cup campaign began in the third round against fellow Premier League side Everton. The only goal of the match came in the second half; John Beresford's right-wing cross beat the Everton defence and allowed John Barnes to hook the ball back from beyond the far post. Ian Rush forced the ball over the line, and in the process set a new goalscoring record – scoring 43 goals in the competition. Newcastle were drawn away to non-league Stevenage Borough in the fourth round. Alan Shearer on his return scored inside the first three minutes; he headed the ball into the net after good play from Keith Gillespie. Giuliano Grazioli equalised for the home side and they held on for a replay at St James' Park.

In the rematch, Shearer scored both goals against Stevenage Borough. His manager Kenny Dalglish was irritated at the lack of courtesy his opponents had shown, and said afterwards: "Off the pitch they have a lot to learn about manners. If they were a Premier League club they would probably have been done for bringing the game into disrepute." A 1–0 win in the fifth round at home to Tranmere Rovers was followed by a quarter-final draw against Barnsley, who had knocked out competition favourites Manchester United. Newcastle advanced to the semi-finals after a 3–1 win and at Old Trafford, Shearer scored the winner against Sheffield United.

== Pre-match ==
Arsenal were appearing in the final of the FA Cup for the first time since 1993. They had won the cup on six occasions (in 1930, 1936, 1950, 1971, 1979 and 1993) and lost the showpiece final by the same amount. Newcastle in contrast were making their first Cup final appearance in 24 years. The club had won six FA Cups, and came runners-up five times, most recently against Liverpool in 1974.

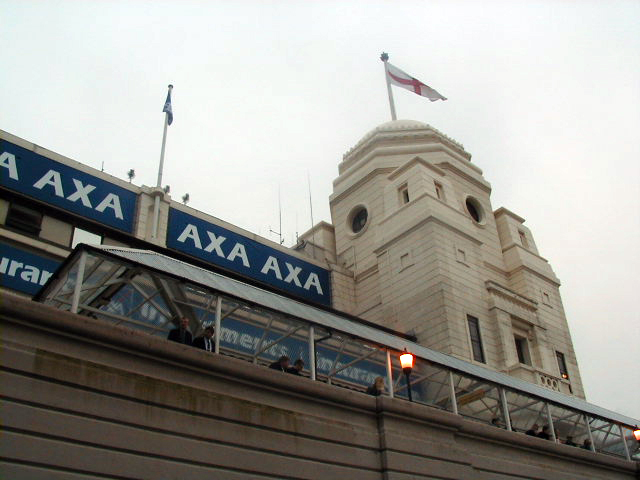
The final was held at Wembley Stadium, where both sides had faced each other twice before in the competition.

The 1998 final marked the third meeting between Arsenal and Newcastle United in Cup final history. Newcastle were victorious on both occasions: the first match in 1932 ended 2–1 in their favour, while the second, staged twenty years later, was settled by a single goal by George Robledo. The recent head-to-head record between the clubs was vastly different. In Dalglish's first full season at Newcastle, his team struggled for consistency and spent much of the Premier League campaign hovering in mid-table. They lost both matches against Arsenal, 1–0 at home in December 1997 and 3–0 away in April 1998. It marked a turnaround in fortune as Newcastle for the past two seasons had competed intensely with Manchester United for the league title. Arsenal on the other hand hit their stride in the final months of the season. The team, managed by Arsène Wenger, had made up a sizeable gap on Manchester United to win the title. In doing so, Wenger became the first non-British manager to win the league championship in England.

Arsenal were favourites to win the FA Cup, and on course to complete an "unlikely" double. The fitness of Bergkamp, who was instrumental in Arsenal's successful season, was a major story in the days leading up to the final. The striker had limped out of their game against Derby County in late April, and after it emerged he pulled his hamstring Bergkamp was ruled out for the remainder of Arsenal's league campaign. Wenger revealed two days before the final that Bergkamp had resumed training and "medically he looked all right", but the player received a further setback when he suffered a reaction to his hamstring. He ruled himself out of the match and told reporters: "I'm very disappointed. As a little boy in Holland I always watched the FA Cup final. And I used to dream about playing in it myself one day." Ian Wright was listed as Bergkamp's probable replacement to partner Anelka.

Newcastle had their own issues surrounding Shearer. The England international was involved in a tangle with Leicester City player Neil Lennon during a league match, which went unnoticed by the referee. Television cameras showed Shearer kicking Lennon in the face, something he denied was premeditated. He was charged with misconduct, but escaped a ban from the FA's disciplinary panel. Shearer's teammate Rob Lee felt the striker was in the right shape of mind to face Arsenal, saying: "He's too strong a person to have let that affect him, even if it hadn't been sorted." Dalglish talked before the game of Newcastle's disappointing league campaign and questioned "why we couldn't translate our Cup results into the league". He dismissed talk of Newcastle having an "easy run" in the competition, saying "It's not our fault if our opponents beat teams who were favourites to go through."

Continuing a tradition which began in the 1970s, the finalists each released a song as part of the buildup to the final. The Arsenal squad recorded a cover of Donna Summer's "Hot Stuff" with proceeds going to the Arsenal Charitable Trust, while Newcastle enlisted celebrity supporter Sting to write "Black and White Army (Bringing the Pride Back Home)" (sang by Ryan Molloy). Arsenal's song spent seven weeks in the UK Singles Chart and peaked at number nine. Royalty was present at Wembley on the day of the final; Prince Edward, Duke of Kent was on hand to perform various duties alongside his wife Katharine, Duchess of Kent. Players from both sides were adorned in Hugo Boss suits for their customary pre-match walk.

== Match ==
=== Summary ===
Wenger selected Wreh to lead Arsenal's attack, and left Wright on the substitutes’ bench. The Liberian striker partnered Anelka in a front two, and they were supported by wide midfielders Overmars and Parlour. Dalglish named Alessandro Pistone in the starting eleven to play as right back; commentator John Motson suggested the defender's role was to nullify Overmars. Temuri Ketsbaia was picked ahead of Andreas Andersson and John Barnes started the game on the bench. Rush did not make the 16-man squad for Newcastle, as he failed to recover from injury. Both clubs were set up in a traditional 4–4–2 system: a four-man defence (comprising two centre-backs and left and right full-backs), four midfielders (two in the centre, and one on each wing) and two centre-forwards.

Newcastle kicked-off the final on a warm Saturday afternoon and quickly set about testing Arsenal by aiming long balls in their half. Arsenal won many of the aerial duels and broke quickly once they had possession. Parlour chased after a long ball by Dixon from the right, but Howey impeded the midfielder and put the ball out for a corner. It came to nothing as the whistle was blown once Adams's climbed above his opponent. Newcastle's first attempt on goal was created by Ketsbaia, who won the ball near the centre of the pitch. He shifted it onto his left foot, but his shot from about 20 yards (18 m) bobbled past Arsenal goalkeeper David Seaman's left-hand post. Arsenal's first real chance was a move which began from the backline. Vieira found Parlour who kicked the ball towards Dixon. The Arsenal right-back saw Parlour making a dart forward into the opposition's penalty area and returned the ball to the midfielder. Parlour's cross from the right was met by Anelka in the box, but the striker headed the ball over the post. Arsenal took the lead minutes later through Overmars. A through-ball by Emmanuel Petit had found the charging winger and he resisted the challenge of Pistone to prod the ball through the legs of the onrushing goalkeeper Shay Given. It was Overmars' 16th goal of the campaign, his most prolific season as a professional footballer. Newcastle struggled to breach Arsenal's stable defence for the remainder of the first half; Ketsbaia saw his curling shot on target but comfortably caught by Seaman. Overmars, a constant threat in the match, crossed the ball towards Parlour in the penalty area, but with room to shoot the midfielder skied it over. Newcastle appealed for a penalty deep into added time after Adams jumped over Shearer while looking to clear the ball, but the referee immediately turned it down.

In the second half, Newcastle began more adventurously and forced Arsenal into moving the ball at a higher tempo. From a free-kick awarded near the left channel, Lee crossed the ball and up rose Nikos Dabizas, whose header hit the bar. Newcastle were presented with another opportunity to equalise after Arsenal defender Martin Keown slipped on the ball. Shearer pounced, but his left-foot shot hit the foot of the post, and rebounded back out. Newcastle were punished for poor finishing in the 69th minute as Anelka scored for Arsenal. Parlour lifted the ball through to the teenage striker who controlled it with his chest. He raced past his marker Dabizas, and steered the ball into the bottom left-hand corner. Newcastle responded by bringing on Andersson, an extra forward, in place of Pearce but the change in personnel made no difference to the outcome. Parlour, later awarded man of the match, nearly scored a third for Arsenal, but his effort hit the side netting. As the whistle blew for full-time, Wenger hugged his assistant Pat Rice in the dugout before joining his players on the field for celebrations. Sportingly, the Newcastle fans applauded the Arsenal team as they made their way up the Wembley steps to collect the trophy.

=== Details ===
16 May 1998
15:00 BST

Arsenal	2–0	Newcastle United
Overmars 23'; Anelka 69'	Report

Wembley Stadium, London
Attendance: 79,183
Referee: Paul Durkin (Dorset)

Arsenal	Newcastle United

GK	1	(England) David Seaman
RB	2	(England) Lee Dixon
CB	14	(England) Martin Keown
CB	6	(England) Tony Adams (c)
LB	3	(England) Nigel Winterburn	(yellow card) 51'
RM	15	(England) Ray Parlour
CM	4	(France) Patrick Vieira
CM	17	(France) Emmanuel Petit
LM	11	(Netherlands) Marc Overmars
CF	9	(France) Nicolas Anelka
CF	12	(Liberia) Christopher Wreh		(substituted off) 62'
Substitutes:
GK	13	(Austria) Alex Manninger
DF	5	(England) Steve Bould
MF	7	(England) David Platt		(substituted on) 62'
MF	18	(France) Gilles Grimandi
FW	8	(England) Ian Wright
Manager:
(France) Arsène Wenger

GK	1	(Republic of Ireland) Shay Given
RB	23	(Italy) Alessandro Pistone
CB	34	(Greece) Nikos Dabizas	(yellow card) 53'
CB	6	(England) Steve Howey	(yellow card) 70'
LB	12	(England) Stuart Pearce		(substituted off) 73'
RM	2	(England) Warren Barton	(yellow card) 48'	(substituted off) 76'
CM	7	(England) Rob Lee (c)
CM	4	(England) David Batty
LM	11	(Wales) Gary Speed
SS	14	(Georgia (country)) (Cyprus) Temuri Ketsbaia		(substituted off) 86'
CF	9	(England) Alan Shearer	(yellow card) 45'
Substitutes:
GK	15	(Trinidad and Tobago) Shaka Hislop
DF	19	(England) Steve Watson		(substituted on) 76'
DF	27	(Belgium) Philippe Albert
MF	10	(England) John Barnes		(substituted on) 86'
FW	40	(Sweden) Andreas Andersson		(substituted on) 73'
Manager:
(Scotland) Kenny Dalglish

Match rules

- 90 minutes
- 30 minutes of extra-time if necessary
- Replay required if scores still level
- Five named substitutes, of which three may be used

=== Statistics ===
Statistic	Arsenal	Newcastle United
Goals scored	2	0
Possession	48%	52%
Attempts at goal	13	10
Shots on target	3	1
Corner kicks	4	2
Fouls	18	14
Offsides	5	3
Yellow cards	1	4
Red cards	0	0

== Post-match ==
Arsenal's win had sealed a league and cup double and Wenger, the club's manager, described it as "the greatest moment of my sporting life." Speaking to the media, he complimented his team for their performance and said of the season: "We kept getting better and so has the mixture between the foreign and English players." Wenger reserved praise for the goalscorers Overmars ("a world-class player") and Anelka ("Nicolas is very young. But you saw in the second half today what he can do"), and felt the turning point in the match was Shearer's shot hitting the post. He sympathised with Newcastle, as did his captain, Adams who said afterwards: "The team and their fans did everything they could out there, but it was our day. It capped a fantastic season for us and was a day we'll never forget." Overmars called winning the FA Cup, "...the biggest thing that you can dream of. I'd say it's the same as winning the European Cup", while Dixon, a long-serving member of the team, added Arsenal's achievement had "...surpasse[d] anything that we've done in the past."

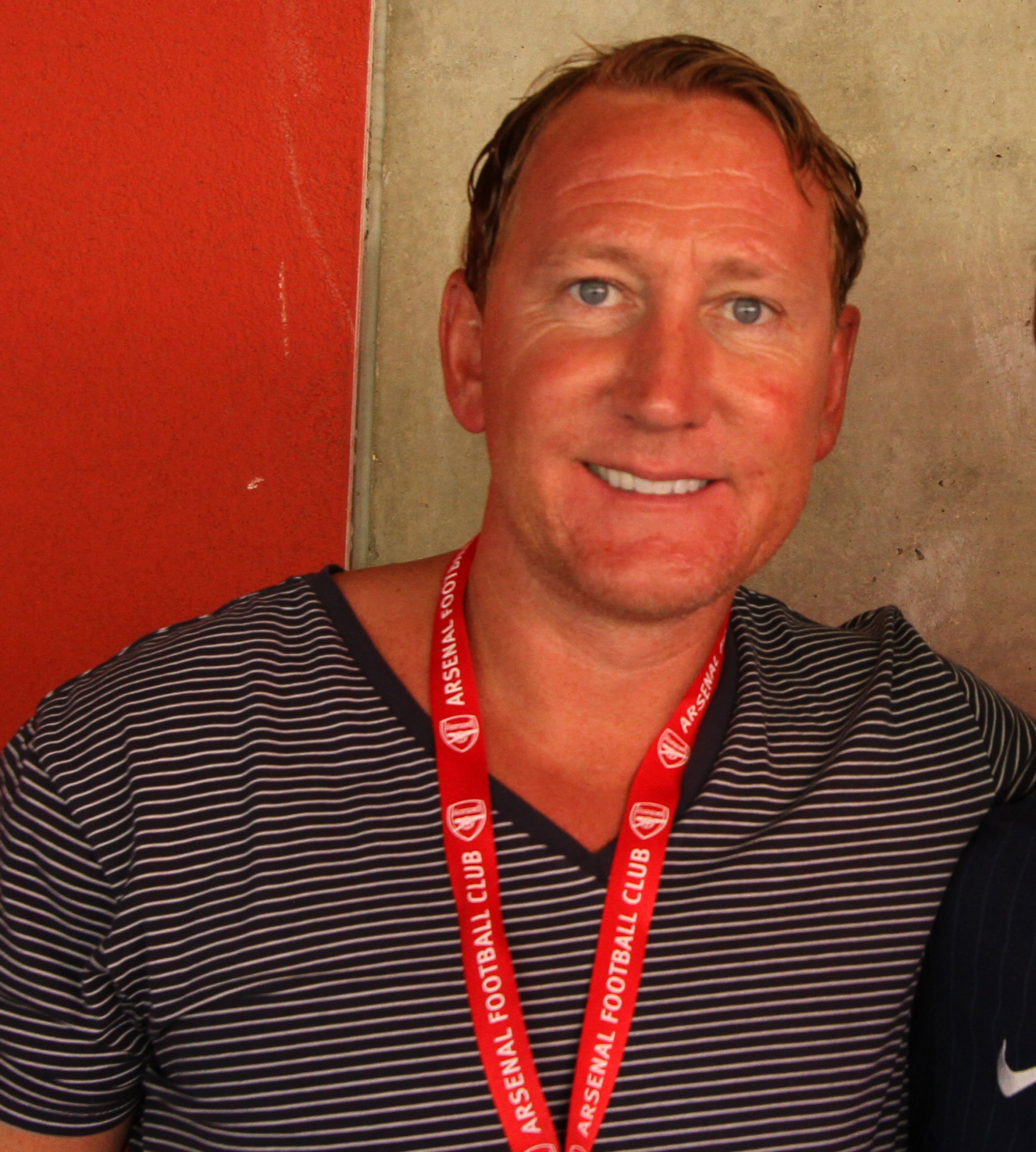
Ray Parlour (pictured in 2012) was awarded the man of the match prize.

Dalglish congratulated Arsenal on completing the double, as well as both sets of supporters: "I think it's the first time I've come to Wembley and seen both sets of fans applauding the winning side." He felt Newcastle's performance improved in the second half – "...our players seemed to have more belief in themselves", though concluded despite the efforts it "just wasn't to be." Pearce agreed with his manager that Arsenal deserved the win and told reporters: "We failed to deliver and our magnificent fans deserved better. We'll have to come back stronger next season."

"Arsène Wenger may have dressed like an undertaker for Wembley, but he is a Prince of Light for the English game."

— Rob Hughes' assessment of Arsenal's manager in The Times, 18 May 1998

Journalists and pundits reviewing the final unanimously agreed that Arsenal were deserved winners. Ian Ridley wrote in The Independent on Sunday of 17 May 1998: "Where Arsenal played legato, Newcastle were staccato in their passing and though they enjoyed a purple patch after raising the tempo in the second half, twice hitting the goal frame, they were largely limp opposition." The Guardian football correspondent David Lacey was in awe of the double winners' performance, writing "There have been more distinguished Wembley triumphs but it is hard to remember a final being won with the sheet pace of Arsenal's victory over Newcastle on Saturday." Paul Wilson of The Observer believed in comparison to their title charge it was "lukewarm stuff", while The Sunday Times match reporter Joe Lovejoy felt the London club had got the better of Newcastle in what was a "pretty ordinary game". Lovejoy did however credit the Newcastle support – "The Toon Army won the decibel count, which was no surprise." David Pleat wrote in his analysis column for The Sunday Times that key to Arsenal's victory was winning the midfield battle. He singled the "prodigious" Parlour out for praise, writing "nobody did more efficient work than the man rejuvenated at Arsenal."

The match was broadcast live in the United Kingdom by both ITV and Sky Sports; the former provided the free-to-air coverage and Sky Sports 2 was the pay-TV alternative. Highlights were also shown on Match of the Day that evening on BBC One. ITV held the majority of the viewership, with an overnight audience of 7.8 million viewers (65% viewing share), whereas 900,000 watched on Sky. The terrestrial figure was the lowest in Cup final history in more than a decade, which ITV attributed to the May heatwave.

A day after the win Arsenal paraded both trophies on an open-top bus, heading towards Islington Town Hall for a civic reception. The club's victory set up a Charity Shield match against Manchester United, the league runners-up, in August 1998. As cup winners, Arsenal would have ordinarily been awarded a spot in the UEFA Cup Winners' Cup, but as the club qualified for the UEFA Champions League via their league position the place was passed to finalists Newcastle United.

== Aftermath and legacy ==
Arsenal were unable to retain the FA Cup the following season as the team fell to Manchester United at the semi-final stage. It was not until 2001 that they appeared in another Cup final, where Michael Owen scored twice at Cardiff's Millennium Stadium to hand Liverpool the trophy. Arsenal regrouped the following year, starting a run of three FA Cup wins in four years. By 2015, Wenger had led Arsenal to a record-breaking 13th FA Cup and victory against Chelsea in 2017 earnt him the accolade of being the most successful manager in the competition's history.

The 1998 Cup final was the climax to an eventful season for Wenger, who became the first manager born outside of the British Isles to complete the double. As well as revitalising the club, his style of management was heralded as revolutionary. Rob Hughes in his Times column of 18 May 1998 credited the Arsenal manager for demonstrating "what there is to learn from overseas", and for blending players of different ages and cultural backgrounds into a successful squad. The 1998 double-winning team is regarded as one of English football's finest; former Manchester United winger Ryan Giggs later described them as one of his toughest opponents: "They just had a bit of everything really. Quality with Bergkamp, pace with Anelka and Overmars, the experience of the back four, and then the toughness of Vieira and Petit in midfield."

For Newcastle, success was hard to come by. In August 1998, just two matches into the Premier League season, Dalglish was dismissed, replaced by former Chelsea manager Ruud Gullit. Although the team reached another FA Cup final in 1999, they were again losing finalists.
