= 1998 FA Charity Shield =

English football match

- The match programme cover
Arsenal	Manchester United
3	0
- Date: 9 August 1998
- Venue: Wembley Stadium, London
- Man of the Match: Marc Overmars (Arsenal)
- Referee: Graham Poll (Hertfordshire)
- Attendance: 67,342
- Weather: Clear; 22 °C (72 °F)

The 1998 Football Association Charity Shield (also known as The AXA FA Charity Shield for sponsorship reasons) was the 76th FA Charity Shield, an annual English football match organised by The Football Association and played between the winners of the previous season's Premier League and FA Cup competitions. It was contested on 9 August 1998 by Arsenal – who won a league and FA Cup double the previous season – and Manchester United – who finished as runners-up in the league. Watched by a crowd of 67,342 at Wembley Stadium in London, Arsenal won the match 3–0.

This was Manchester United's 18th Charity Shield appearance to Arsenal's 14th. Manchester United began the game more strongly, but Arsenal took the lead when Marc Overmars scored 11 minutes before half-time. They extended their lead in the second half, as Overmars and Nicolas Anelka found Christopher Wreh, who put the ball into an empty net at the second attempt. In the 72nd minute, Arsenal scored a third goal, when Anelka got around Jaap Stam in the penalty box and shot the ball past goalkeeper Peter Schmeichel.

Arsenal's victory marked Manchester United's first Shield defeat in 13 years. The teams later faced each other in the FA Cup semi-final, which was won by Manchester United in a replay. Manchester United finished the league season one point ahead of Arsenal and went on to win the FA Cup and UEFA Champions League, thereby completing a treble of trophies in the 1998–99 season.

== Background ==
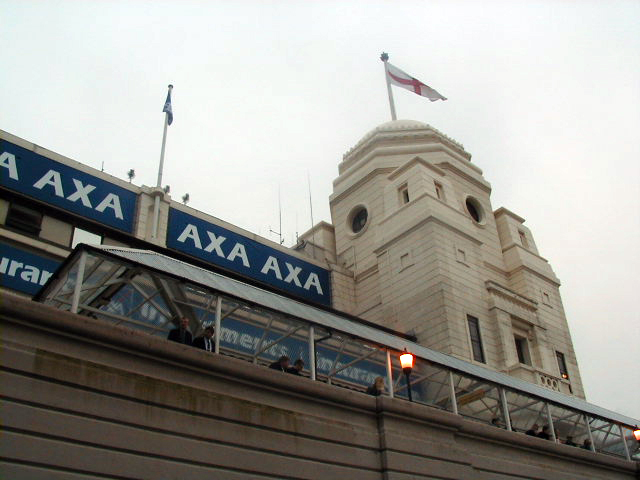
Wembley Stadium played host to the Charity Shield for the 25th time.

Founded in 1908 as a successor to the Sheriff of London Charity Shield, the FA Charity Shield began as a contest between the respective champions of The Football League and the Southern League, although in 1913, it was played between an Amateurs XI and a Professionals XI. In 1921, it was contested by the league champions of the top division and FA Cup winners for the first time. (Note: The Premier League replaced the Football League First Division at the top of the English football pyramid after its inception in 1992.)

Arsenal qualified for the 1998 FA Charity Shield as winners of both the 1997–98 FA Premier League and the 1997–98 FA Cup. Although they were 12 points behind league leaders Manchester United by the end of February 1998, a nine-match winning streak, culminating in a 4–0 win over Everton on 3 May 1998, ensured Arsenal won the title. Arsenal then beat Newcastle United 2–0 in the 1998 FA Cup Final to complete the domestic double. Given they won both honours, the other Charity Shield place went to league runners-up Manchester United.

The most recent meeting between the two teams was in the Premier League on 14 March 1998, when a second-half goal by Marc Overmars gave Arsenal a 1–0 win at Old Trafford, the second of Arsenal's nine consecutive wins. Arsenal were the only team in the 1997–98 league to beat United home and away; the corresponding home fixture on 9 November 1997 ended 3–2. Arsenal manager Arsène Wenger acknowledged the Shield game was the "only opportunity to play our first-team men together against top-class opposition" before their league campaign commenced the following week. Manchester United manager Alex Ferguson was preoccupied with the team's match against ŁKS Łódź in the second qualifying round of the UEFA Champions League three days later.

The match was officially referred to as "The AXA FA Charity Shield" as part of a sponsorship deal between The Football Association and French insurance group AXA, agreed in July 1998. The deal also saw the FA Cup referred to as "The AXA Sponsored FA Cup" for its four-year duration.

== Venue ==
The match was played at Wembley Stadium, which first hosted the Shield in 1974.

== Match ==
=== Team selection ===
Manchester United winger Jesper Blomqvist, who had signed from Parma just under three weeks earlier, was ruled out with an ankle injury, but Roy Keane was fit enough to start his first competitive match since rupturing his cruciate ligaments 11 months previously. Defender Jaap Stam, who signed for United in July 1998, made his competitive debut for the club, partnering centre-back Ronny Johnsen. For Arsenal, new signing Nelson Vivas began the match on the substitutes' bench, in spite of being expected to make his full debut, while Dennis Bergkamp started alongside Nicolas Anelka up front.

Arsenal employed a traditional 4–4–2 formation: a four-man defence (comprising two centre-backs and left and right full-backs), four midfielders (two in the centre, and one on each wing) and two centre-forwards. Manchester United organised themselves slightly differently, and lined up in a 4–4–1–1 formation with Paul Scholes playing ahead of the midfield in a supporting role behind the main striker, Andy Cole.

=== Summary ===
In pitch-side temperatures of 30 °C (86 °F), Manchester United enjoyed their best spell of the match early on, while Arsenal's pair Patrick Vieira and Emmanuel Petit got used to the flow of the game. United fashioned their first chance through David Beckham, who was booed throughout the match on account of many fans blaming him for England's elimination from the 1998 FIFA World Cup. (Note: Beckham was sent off for kicking Diego Simeone in the second round of the 1998 World Cup against Argentina. His dismissal led to considerable abuse from certain sections of the media and England fans. The player became a scapegoat for the national team's failure to progress, as in the match England were eliminated on penalties.) His pass eventually met Scholes, whose attempt forced Arsenal goalkeeper David Seaman to clear. In spite of United's promising start, it was Arsenal who scored the opening goal. Vieira played the ball down the right side of the penalty area in the direction of Bergkamp and Anelka. Bergkamp got there first and back-heeled the ball to Anelka, but the Frenchman was unable to take control; however, he was able to put pressure on Johnsen in the Manchester United defence and blocked the Norwegian's attempted clearance. The ball ran across the edge of the penalty area to Overmars, who lashed it right-footed past Manchester United goalkeeper Peter Schmeichel into the net. A shot by Keane from 25 yards (23 m) prompted a save from Seaman in the 42nd minute.

Arsenal began dominating in the second half, and increased their lead after 57 minutes. From the left wing, Overmars used his pace to get the better of Gary Neville and passed the ball to Anelka, who turned and passed to an unmarked Christopher Wreh. Schmeichel blocked the Liberian's initial shot with his feet, but he was unable to stop the second attempt, which Wreh celebrated acrobatically. Despite the setback, United continued to press Arsenal; defender Martin Keown almost put the ball into his own goal from Ryan Giggs's corner. Both teams made mass substitutions in the final third of the game, notably Teddy Sheringham and Luís Boa Morte coming on for Cole – who rarely threatened – and Petit, respectively. Arsenal scored their third in the 72nd minute – Parlour's pass found Anelka, who got around Stam and shot the ball past Schmeichel from a narrow angle, inside the goalkeeper's near post. Near the end, Sheringham wasted a goal-scoring opportunity, shooting wide.

=== Details ===
9 August 1998
13:00 BST

Arsenal	3–0	Manchester United
Overmars 34'; Wreh 57'; Anelka 72'

Wembley Stadium, London
Attendance: 67,342
Referee: Graham Poll (Hertfordshire)

Arsenal	Manchester United

GK	1	(England) David Seaman
RB	2	(England) Lee Dixon	(yellow card) 81'
CB	6	(England) Tony Adams (c)		(substituted off) 80'
CB	14	(England) Martin Keown	(yellow card) 22'
LB	3	(England) Nigel Winterburn
RM	15	(England) Ray Parlour
CM	17	(France) Emmanuel Petit		(substituted off) 73'
CM	4	(France) Patrick Vieira		(substituted off) 84'
LM	11	(Netherlands) Marc Overmars		(substituted off) 67'
CF	9	(France) Nicolas Anelka
CF	10	(Netherlands) Dennis Bergkamp		(substituted off) 46'
Substitutes:
GK	13	(Austria) Alex Manninger
DF	5	(England) Steve Bould		(substituted on) 80'
DF	7	(Argentina) Nelson Vivas
MF	16	(England) Stephen Hughes		(substituted on) 67'
MF	18	(France) Gilles Grimandi		(substituted on) 84'
MF	21	(Portugal) Luís Boa Morte		(substituted on) 73'
FW	12	(Liberia) Christopher Wreh		(substituted on) 46'
Manager:
(France) Arsène Wenger

GK	1	(Denmark) Peter Schmeichel
RB	2	(England) Gary Neville	(yellow card) 3'
CB	5	(Norway) Ronny Johnsen
CB	6	(Netherlands) Jaap Stam
LB	3	(Republic of Ireland) Denis Irwin	(yellow card) 26'
RM	7	(England) David Beckham
CM	8	(England) Nicky Butt		(substituted off) 53'
CM	16	(Republic of Ireland) Roy Keane (c)		(substituted off) 76'
LM	11	(Wales) Ryan Giggs		(substituted off) 70'
CF	18	(England) Paul Scholes		(substituted off) 70'
CF	9	(England) Andy Cole		(substituted off) 70'
Substitutes:
GK	31	(England) Nick Culkin
DF	4	(England) David May
DF	12	(England) Phil Neville	(yellow card) 79'	(substituted on) 70'
DF	21	(Norway) Henning Berg		(substituted on) 76'
MF	25	(Netherlands) Jordi Cruyff		(substituted on) 70'
FW	10	(England) Teddy Sheringham		(substituted on) 70'
FW	20	(Norway) Ole Gunnar Solskjær		(substituted on) 53'
Manager:
(Scotland) Alex Ferguson

Man of the match

- Marc Overmars (Arsenal)

Match officials

- Assistant referees:
  - Dave Morrall (South Yorkshire)
  - Peter Walton (Northamptonshire)
- Fourth official: Neale Barry (Lincolnshire)

Match rules

- 90 minutes
- Penalty shootout if scores level
- Seven named substitutes, of which up to six may be used

=== Statistics ===
Statistic	Arsenal	Manchester United
Goals scored	3	0
Possession	55%	45%
Shots on target	7	2
Shots off target	1	3
Corner kicks	2	11
Offsides	3	5
Yellow cards	2	3
Red cards	0	0

== Post-match ==
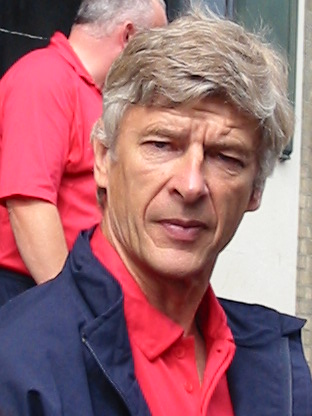
Arsène Wenger was surprised by Arsenal's margin of victory.

The result marked Manchester United's first defeat in the Charity Shield since 1985, during which time they had appeared in the competition five times, and the ninth time Arsenal had won it. Arsenal became the first southern club (Note: One which is located in the southern counties of England. Initially these were amateur clubs, as professionalism in football was not as readily accepted in the south as in the north. In the 1893–94 season, Arsenal (under its former name Woolwich Arsenal) turned professional and became the first southern club admitted to the northern-oriented Football League. The following year saw the creation of the Southern Football League, which was composed of amateur and professional teams. By the 1920–21 season, the top division of the Southern Football League was absorbed by the Football League, to create its third division.) to win the Shield outright since Tottenham Hotspur in 1962. Wenger described the scoreline as "unexpected" and cited the first goal as crucial in the match, given the weather conditions. He was content with how his international players, who had been at the World Cup, coped with the game's physicality.

Ferguson admitted his team had been beaten by the better side and agreed with Wenger that the first goal was important. He was pleased that Keane got through the match after 11 months out of action and was confident his team would fare better against ŁKS Łódź, the following Wednesday. Schmeichel felt the upcoming Champions League qualifier was more important than the Charity Shield game, which he considered as a pre-season match. Ferguson anticipated another challenge from Arsenal in the league: "I think you could make a strong case for four teams to challenge for the Premiership but I think Arsenal pose the biggest threat."

Three days after the Charity Shield match, United beat ŁKS Łódź 2–0 and qualified for the Champions League group stage following a goalless match a fortnight later. Arsenal had the upper hand in their two league meetings with United during the season, winning 3–0 at Highbury in September 1998, before a 1–1 draw at Old Trafford in February 1999. The two teams went into the final day of the 1998–99 FA Premier League vying for the title, but United's 2–1 win against Tottenham meant they finished one point above Arsenal. The two sides met twice more that season in the FA Cup semi-final, which was settled in a replay after the original match finished goalless. Manchester United won in extra time – the winning goal scored by Giggs. United then went on to defeat Newcastle United 2–0 in the 1999 FA Cup Final. Whereas Arsenal failed to progress past the group stage of the Champions League, Manchester United went on to reach the final, where they beat Bayern Munich to win the competition for the second time. Ferguson's team therefore completed a treble of trophies in one season.

== See also ==
- 1998–99 Arsenal F.C. season
- 1998–99 Manchester United F.C. season
- Arsenal F.C.–Manchester United F.C. rivalry
