= Christopher Wreh =

Liberian footballer (born 1975)

Personal information
- Full name: Christopher Wreh
- Date of birth: 14 May 1975 (age 51)
- Place of birth: Monrovia, Liberia
- Height: 1.73 m (5 ft 8 in)
- Position: Striker

Youth career
- Invincible Eleven
- 1989–1993: Monaco

Senior career*
Years	Team	Apps	(Gls)
1993–1997	Monaco	13	(3)
1996–1997	→ Guingamp (loan)	33	(10)
1997–2000	Arsenal	28	(3)
1999	→ AEK Athens (loan)	11	(4)
1999	→ Birmingham City (loan)	7	(1)
2000	→ Den Bosch (loan)	7	(2)
2000–2001	Al-Hilal		
2001	AFC Bournemouth	0	(0)
2001–2002	St Mirren	3	(0)
2003	Persepolis	0	(0)
2003–2004	Bishop's Stortford	1	(1)
2004	Buckingham Town		
2007–2010	Perseman Manokwari		

International career
1995–2002	Liberia	36	(12)
- * Club domestic league appearances and goals

Christopher Wreh (born 14 May 1975) is a Liberian retired professional footballer who played as a striker. He was a member of the Arsenal side which won the Premier League and FA Cup double during the 1997–98 season.

At the international level, he won 36 caps for Liberia, scoring 11 goals, and was in their squad for the 1996 Africa Cup of Nations.

== Club career ==
Wreh played domestically for Invincible Eleven, before signing for French Division 1 club Monaco as a youth. A center forward, Wreh played for Monaco as a substitute in the 1993–94 UEFA Champions League semi-final. He had a spell on loan at Guingamp, finishing the season as the team's top scorer and playing in the 1997 Coupe de France Final, which they lost on penalties to Nice.

Wreh signed for Arsenal in the summer of 1997 for £300,000, linking up with his former manager at Monaco, Arsène Wenger. Although fourth choice behind Ian Wright, Dennis Bergkamp and Nicolas Anelka, Wreh still played an important part in the Gunners' Double-winning 1997–98 season. Wreh scored in 1–0 Premier League wins against Wimbledon and Bolton Wanderers in March, the fifth in a 5–0 win against Wimbledon, and netted the only goal of the Gunners' FA Cup semi-final win over Wolverhampton Wanderers both in April. Wreh started in the 1998 FA Cup Final, and although he did not score, Arsenal beat Newcastle United 2–0.

Despite scoring in the 1998 FA Charity Shield against Manchester United, Wreh's form dipped and, after the arrival of Thierry Henry and Davor Šuker at the club in 1999, he was squeezed out altogether. He had brief loan spells with Birmingham City, for whom he scored once, against Grimsby Town, and at AEK Athens and Den Bosch, but none of these were subsequently made permanent. He left Arsenal in 2000, having scored five times in 46 appearances.

Wreh then became somewhat of a journeyman footballer. He initially signed for Saudi Arabian side Al-Hilal, then returned to the UK in 2001 with brief stints at AFC Bournemouth and St Mirren, but fitness problems meant he rarely played; he then played non-league football for Bishop's Stortford although he only played one game due to repeated absenteeism, and United Counties League club Buckingham Town.

In 2007, he returned to football, signing for Perseman Manokwari of the Liga Indonesia Premier Division where he brought an end to his playing days.

== International career ==
Wreh made his debut for Liberia in 1995, and went on to win 36 caps for his country, scoring 11 goals.

== Coaching career ==
Wreh was appointed head coach of the Liberian under-20 team in late 2014. In September 2019 he became assistant coach to the senior national team.

== Personal life ==
Wreh's son, Chris, is also a footballer and currently plays for Bedford Town F.C. in the English National League North.

== Honours ==
Guingamp

- UEFA Intertoto Cup: 1996
- Coupe de France runner-up: 1996–97

Arsenal

- Premier League: 1997–98
- FA Cup: 1997–98
- FA Charity Shield: 1998, 1999
