= 1999 FA Charity Shield =

- The match programme cover.
Arsenal	Manchester United
2	1
- Date: 1 August 1999
- Venue: Wembley Stadium, London
- Man of the Match: Nwankwo Kanu (Arsenal)
- Referee: Graham Barber (Hertfordshire)
- Attendance: 70,185
- Weather: Clear; 29 °C (84 °F)

The 1999 Football Association Charity Shield (also known as The One 2 One FA Charity Shield for sponsorship reasons) was the 77th FA Charity Shield, an annual English football match played between the winners of the previous season's Premier League and FA Cup competitions. The teams involved were Manchester United, who had won both the Premier League and FA Cup as part of the Treble the previous season, and Arsenal, who finished runners-up in the league. Watched by a crowd of 70,185 at Wembley Stadium, Arsenal won the match 2–1.

This was Arsenal's 15th Charity Shield appearance and Manchester United's 19th. Leading up to the match, both clubs were embroiled in controversy: United withdrew from English football's primary cup competition, the FA Cup, in order to take part in the 2000 FIFA Club World Championship; Arsenal were entangled in a transfer saga involving their own player, striker Nicolas Anelka, who vowed to never play for the club again. United goalkeeper Mark Bosnich, signed as a replacement for Peter Schmeichel, made the first appearance of his second spell with the club. Sylvinho started his first game for Arsenal, whereas other signing Oleh Luzhnyi was named on the substitutes' bench. United went ahead seven minutes before the end of the first half, when David Beckham's free-kick hit the underside of the crossbar and narrowly crossed the line before Dwight Yorke made sure. Arsenal were awarded a penalty in the second half which Nwankwo Kanu converted and the striker assisted his teammate Ray Parlour to score the winner.

This result marked Manchester United's first defeat of 1999. It was the second consecutive year that Arsenal beat United to win the Charity Shield. Arsenal manager Arsène Wenger described it as psychological boost to beat his opponents and felt the win showed that his team were ready for the upcoming season. United manager Sir Alex Ferguson, on the other hand, believed the defeat highlighted his players needed more game time.

== Background ==
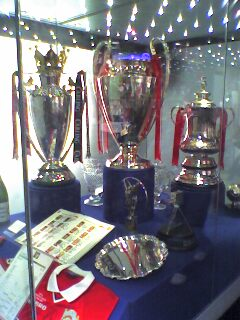
Manchester United acclaimed a treble of trophies in the 1998–99 season.

Founded in 1908 as a successor to the Sheriff of London Charity Shield, the FA Charity Shield began as a contest between the respective champions of the Football League and Southern League, although in 1913, it was played between an Amateurs XI and a Professionals XI. In 1921, it was played by the league champions of the top division and FA Cup winners for the first time. (Note: The Premier League replaced the Football League First Division at the top of the English football pyramid after its inception in 1992.) Wembley Stadium acted as the host of the Shield from 1974.

Manchester United qualified for the 1999 FA Charity Shield as winners of the 1998–99 FA Premier League. The team overcame close competition from Arsenal to win their fifth league title in seven years. In the 1999 FA Cup Final, Manchester United beat Newcastle United by two goals to nil and completed the domestic double. The team later went on to win the UEFA Champions League after defeating Bayern Munich in the season's final and became the first English team to acclaim a treble of trophies in one season. Given United won both domestic honours, the other Charity Shield place went to league runners-up Arsenal. United appeared in 18 previous Shields, winning 10 outright (1908, 1911, 1952, 1956, 1957, 1983, 1993, 1994, 1996, 1997), sharing four (1965, 1967, 1977, 1990) and losing four (1948, 1963, 1985, 1998). In contrast, Arsenal won eight previous Shields (1930, 1931, 1933, 1934, 1938, 1948, 1953, 1998), shared one with Tottenham Hotspur in 1991 and lost five (1935, 1936, 1979, 1989, 1993).

The most recent meeting between the two clubs was in the FA Cup semi-finals; the tie was decided by a replay as the initial game finished goalless. The match was settled in extra time when Giggs ran the length of the pitch and evaded several Arsenal players to score the winning goal. In the close season, Anelka was involved in a protracted transfer saga and vowed to never play for Arsenal again. He cited the media in England as a reason for wanting to leave the club: "The one thing I can tell you is that I can't stand the English Press, who cause me enormous problems on a personal level," but it was implied that his "gold-digging brothers" wanted Anelka to move abroad to make more money – they served as his agents.

In June 1999, United accepted an offer from the FA to withdraw from the FA Cup in order to participate in the 2000 FIFA Club World Championship, staged in Brazil. It was criticised by the new Sports minister Kate Hoey, who suggested the club were treating its supporters in a "shabby way". Manchester United manager Sir Alex Ferguson however replied that United had been pressured to make the decision, which aimed to solidify England's 2006 FIFA World Cup bid: "The Government are saying that we should be in the FA Cup, but they are the very people that were saying originally that we have to go to Brazil. They could tell us quite clearly: 'Do not bother about the World Cup bid, leave that to us. It should not be Manchester United's responsibility.'"

== Pre-match ==
Arsenal manager Arsène Wenger warned some United players might take a while to get into their stride after last season's exploits: "You will always have a dip when you have been on a high like they have, it takes some time to settle and to understand that you have to fight again. We had players who won the World Cup, the players who won the Double and to get them right psychologically and physically took us some time." Ferguson described the 3–0 defeat in the previous season's Shield as a "humiliation", before discussing how it made the team prepare for the challenges ahead: "I have reminded the players how hard it is to lose when you are playing for United these days – it makes so many other people happy." Indeed, United only lost five matches of the whole of last season, with their last defeat coming at home to Middlesbrough in December 1998.

== Match ==
=== Team selection ===
Both teams were without several first-team players because of injury problems. Manchester United midfielder Roy Keane was still suffering from an ankle injury sustained in the previous season's FA Cup final, which meant defender Denis Irwin took responsibility as the team captain. Ryan Giggs was also ruled out of the game, though his injury was unspecified. Forwards Andy Cole and Dwight Yorke started upfront for United, in a 4–4–2 formation where David Beckham and Jordi Cruyff acted as the two wide midfield players. Goalkeeper Mark Bosnich, signed as a replacement for Peter Schmeichel, also started, having rejoined the club after a nine-year spell with Aston Villa.

For Arsenal, defender Tony Adams was ruled out with injury, as was Dennis Bergkamp, Marc Overmars, and goalkeeper David Seaman. Anelka did not partake, given his transfer to Real Madrid was on the verge of being completed. New signings Oleh Luzhnyi and Sylvinho were both named in the squad, but whereas Sylvinho started the game, Luzhnyi was selected as a substitute. Arsenal, like United, lined up in a 4–4–2 formation. Up front, Freddie Ljungberg was paired with the club's only available recognised striker, Nwankwo Kanu.

=== Summary ===
The severe heat meant Manchester United and Arsenal found it hard to find any rhythm early on. Sylvinho fashioned an early chance for Arsenal, though his shot was deflected over. Although midfield pair Patrick Vieira and Emmanuel Petit did well to contain their opponents in the opening half-hour, Arsenal's lack of pace and incisiveness upfront was evident – Ljungberg missed three chances before half-time. Midway through the first half, Beckham was booked by referee Graham Barber for dissent. Moments later Nicky Butt was involved in a brawl with Martin Keown, after the defender nearly caught Butt's face with his boot. Both players were booked for confronting each other, as was Vieira for getting involved. United performed better the longer the match went on and scored the opening goal. Beckham's 30 yards (27 m) free kick hit the underside of the crossbar and bounced out; Yorke headed the rebounded ball past goalkeeper Alex Manninger. Although replays suggested the goal was Beckham's as his free kick crossed the goal line, it was given to Yorke. Arsenal responded for a short while, but missed "three half-chances".

Defender Jaap Stam, "nursing an Achilles injury all summer", was substituted in the second half for David May. Arsenal began the half the better of the two teams and Vieira believed he earned his team a penalty in the 49th minute – it was turned down by Barber. The substitution of Sylvinho for Luis Boa Morte in the 64th minute allowed Ljungberg to play in a natural midfield role. Two minutes later, Arsenal were awarded a penalty. Vieira, chasing down the ball was adjudged to have his shirt tugged by Irwin in the 18-yard box. Kanu converted the penalty, sending Bosnich the wrong way. Yorke soon after mistimed his goal effort after being sent clear by Cole. Substitute Ole Gunnar Solskjær then put Cole through, only for Manninger to produce a one-handed save. Arsenal scored what proved to be the match winner in the 78th minute. A goal-kick by Bosnich was headed back into United's half by Vieira; Kanu controlled the ball "deftly" and set up Parlour, whose shot went into the net. Teddy Sheringham was brought on by Ferguson for Butt with nine minutes of normal time remaining, but with a fourth striker on the field, United were unable to score an equaliser. Luzhnyi later came on for Parlour, the final substitution of the match.

=== Details ===
1 August 1999
15:00 BST

Arsenal	2–1	Manchester United
Kanu 67' (pen.); Parlour 78'	Report	Yorke 36'

Wembley Stadium, London
Attendance: 70,185
Referee: Graham Barber (Hertfordshire)

Arsenal	Manchester United

GK	13	(Austria) Alex Manninger
RB	2	(England) Lee Dixon
CB	5	(England) Martin Keown	(yellow card) 25'
CB	18	(France) Gilles Grimandi
LB	3	(England) Nigel Winterburn (c)
RM	15	(England) Ray Parlour		(substituted off) 88'
CM	4	(France) Patrick Vieira	(yellow card) 25'
CM	17	(France) Emmanuel Petit
LM	16	(Brazil) Sylvinho		(substituted off) 64'
AM	8	(Sweden) Freddie Ljungberg
CF	25	(Nigeria) Nwankwo Kanu
Substitutes:
GK	24	(England) Stuart Taylor
GK	31	(England) John Lukic
DF	19	(Germany) Stefan Malz
DF	22	(Ukraine) Oleh Luzhnyi		(substituted on) 88'
MF	21	(Portugal) Luís Boa Morte		(substituted on) 64'
MF	30	(England) Paolo Vernazza
FW	12	(Liberia) Christopher Wreh
Manager:
(France) Arsène Wenger

GK	1	(Australia) Mark Bosnich
RB	12	(England) Phil Neville
CB	21	(Norway) Henning Berg
CB	6	(Netherlands) Jaap Stam		(substituted off) 46'
LB	3	(Republic of Ireland) Denis Irwin (c)
RM	7	(England) David Beckham	(yellow card) 21'
CM	8	(England) Nicky Butt	(yellow card) 25'	(substituted off) 81'
CM	18	(England) Paul Scholes
LM	14	(Netherlands) Jordi Cruyff		(substituted off) 62'
CF	19	(Trinidad and Tobago) Dwight Yorke
CF	9	(England) Andy Cole
Substitutes:
GK	31	(England) Nick Culkin
DF	4	(England) David May		(substituted on) 46'
DF	13	(England) John Curtis
MF	33	(England) Mark Wilson
MF	34	(England) Jonathan Greening
FW	10	(England) Teddy Sheringham		(substituted on) 81'
FW	20	(Norway) Ole Gunnar Solskjær		(substituted on) 62'
Manager:
(Scotland) Sir Alex Ferguson

=== Statistics ===
Statistic	Arsenal	Manchester United
Goals scored	2	1
Shots on target	3	3
Shots off target	5	3
Corner kicks	6	7
Yellow cards	2	2
Red cards	0	0

== Post-match ==
A defeat is a defeat. But I hope that we have as good a season this season as we did last season after losing to Arsenal in last year's Charity Shield.

— Sir Alex Ferguson, 2 August 1999.

The result marked the first time that Manchester United had lost in the calendar year, ending a 33-match unbeaten run. Wenger believed the result showed that Arsenal were "ready for the season", albeit admitting that the defence had trouble coping with Yorke. He thought it was "...psychologically important to beat United, especially after the great run they have had". Wenger confirmed afterwards that Anelka would sign for Real Madrid: "I hope everything will be finalised in the next couple of days. In any case, he is not coming back here, and although the contract is not signed yet, I hope it will be after his medical and that is the end of it." Kanu, who scored Arsenal's equaliser and set up the match winner, was pleased with his performance and relished the opportunity of establishing himself in the first team, after Anelka's departure.

Ferguson said the defeat showed that Manchester United needed more games to be ready, "particularly, in the second half" and felt travelling "half way across the world" for pre-season did not aid their preparation. In terms of the result, he said it was "about as significant" as it was last year. Bosnich's performance in goal received mixed reviews in the English press; The Sun questioned his positioning and said his kicking was "poor". The player himself assessed: "My kicking has been atrocious and, generally, my distribution from the back has to improve."

== See also ==
- 1999–2000 FA Premier League
- 1999–2000 FA Cup
- Arsenal F.C.–Manchester United F.C. rivalry
