= Alex Manninger =

Austrian footballer (1977–2026)

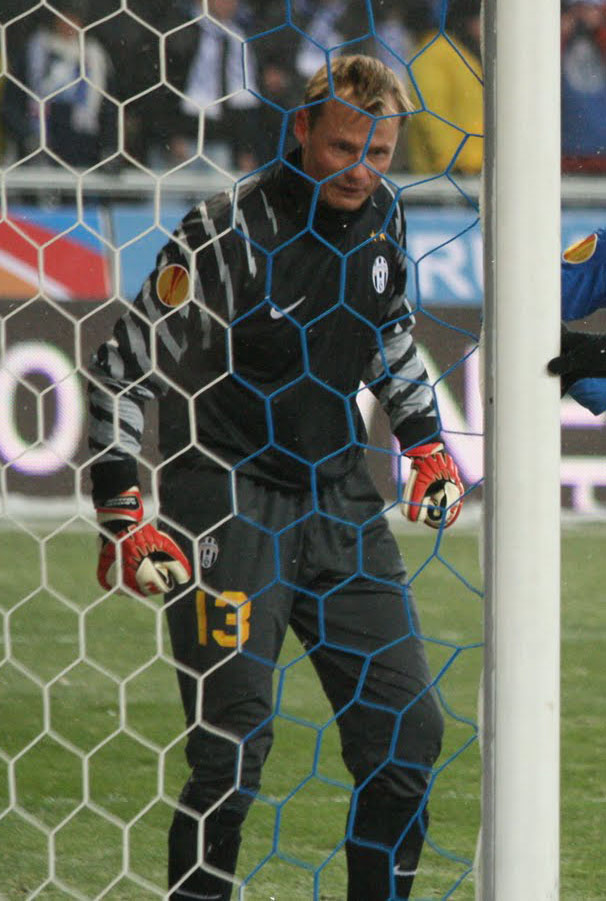
- Manninger playing for Juventus in 2010

Personal information
- Full name: Alexander Manninger
- Date of birth: 4 June 1977
- Place of birth: Salzburg, Austria
- Date of death: 16 April 2026 (aged 48)
- Place of death: Nußdorf am Haunsberg, Salzburg, Austria
- Height: 1.89 m (6 ft 2 in)
- Position: Goalkeeper

Youth career
- 1984–1995: SV Salzburg

Senior career*
Years	Team	Apps	(Gls)
1995–1996	SV Salzburg	1	(0)
1995	→ Vorwärts Steyr (loan)	5	(0)
1996–1997	Grazer AK	23	(0)
1997–2002	Arsenal	39	(0)
2001–2002	→ Fiorentina (loan)	24	(0)
2002	Espanyol	0	(0)
2003	Torino	3	(0)
2003–2005	Bologna	0	(0)
2004–2005	→ Siena (loan)	19	(0)
2005–2006	Red Bull Salzburg	16	(0)
2006–2008	Siena	64	(0)
2008	Red Bull Salzburg	0	(0)
2008	Udinese	0	(0)
2008–2012	Juventus	27	(0)
2012–2016	FC Augsburg	36	(0)
2013	→ FC Augsburg II	1	(0)
2016–2017	Liverpool	0	(0)
Total		258	(0)

International career
1999–2009	Austria	33	(0)
- * Club domestic league appearances and goals

Alexander Manninger (4 June 1977 – 16 April 2026) was an Austrian footballer who played as a goalkeeper. He played internationally for the Austria national team on 33 occasions, including at UEFA Euro 2008, and represented football clubs in Italy, Germany, Austria and England.

== Club career ==
=== Salzburg, Steyr and Grazer AK ===
Manninger started his career as a youth player for SV Salzburg in 1993. He was promoted to the first-team squad at the start of the 1995–96 season. After his debut, and lone appearance of the season, he was sent on loan at Vorwärts Steyr, and played his first top-level game away against Grazer AK.

At the start of 1996–97 season, he signed for Grazer AK, making his debut in the UEFA Cup second-round game against Inter Milan at the Stadio Giuseppe Meazza in Milan. He made twenty-four appearances in his lone season with Grazer AK, before a high-profile transfer to Arsenal in the Premier League, where he was understudy to the experienced David Seaman.

=== Arsenal, Fiorentina and Espanyol ===
During the 1997–98 season, Seaman was injured and Manninger covered for him, enjoying a spell of six clean sheets in a row in the league, a joint club record. The last of these was against Manchester United at Old Trafford, where Arsenal won 1–0. In March 1998, he was named Premier League Player of the Month. However, Manninger had to make way for Seaman once the Englishman returned from injury. Despite only having played seven games in the 1997–98 FA Premier League season (ten was then required to automatically qualify for a winners' medal), Manninger was granted special dispensation for a medal, as his contribution to Arsenal's title win was considered to be significant enough. He also made five appearances in Arsenal's FA Cup run. The highlight for Manninger came in the quarter-final replay at West Ham United. The game went to penalties and he saved Eyal Berkovic's spot kick to help Arsenal through to the semi-finals. He was on the bench as Arsenal won the 1998 FA Cup Final to complete the double.

Manninger continued to deputise for Seaman for the next three seasons. He made sixty-four appearances over four seasons for Arsenal. After the Gunners bought Richard Wright in 2001, Manninger became number three at Arsenal, and spent the 2001–2002 season on loan at Italian side Fiorentina, where he made twenty-four appearances for the Tuscan club.

In July 2002, Espanyol signed Manninger on a four-year deal for £960,000. However, he was released after just two months at Espanyol without making a first team appearance, with Manninger claiming that the Barcelona-based club had reneged on the contract.

=== Torino, Bologna, Siena and Salzburg ===
Manninger subsequently joined Italian side Torino in Serie A in January 2003, and remained with them until the end of the season. At the start of the 2003–04 season, he signed for Bologna, where he spent two seasons largely used as an understudy. He had a short loan spell with Brescia in July 2004, but was subsequently loaned to Siena for the 2004–05 Serie A season during which Manninger made nineteen appearances in the league for the Robur.

In July 2005, Red Bull Salzburg re-signed Manninger from his parent club Bologna, and during season 2005–06 he made sixteen appearances.

=== Return to Siena, Udinese and Juventus ===
Manninger returned to Siena, in Serie A, this time on a permanent basis for the 2006–07 season. He started the season as the club's first choice keeper, but he was injured and replaced by Greek international Dimitrios Eleftheropoulos, who retained the first team goalkeeper's jersey once Manninger was fit again. He was first choice again at the start of 2007–08 season, ahead of Eleftheropolous, and Anssi Jaakkola. In a two-year spell at Siena, Manninger made nearly 70 appearances.

In July 2008, as a non-contract player, he returned to Austria for another spell with Red Bull Salzburg, but before the season started, he had signed for Udinese, where he replaced the Juventus-bound Antonio Chimenti. However, in a career of brief moves, he stayed with the north east Italian club for just two weeks, before being signed by Juventus as backup for Gianluigi Buffon and Chimenti in August 2008. A long-term injury to Buffon resulted in Manninger playing for the first XI from early October 2008 through to late February 2009. During his tenure with Juventus, Manninger made thirty-five appearances in all competitions, drawing praise in the media for his performances. Following an injury to Buffon during the 2010 FIFA World Cup, Juventus signed Marco Storari from AC Milan in the summer of 2010, and Manninger was demoted to the role of the club's third–choice goalkeeper. He was released at the end of the 2011–12 season, following Juventus's league title victory.

=== Augsburg ===
After four months without a club, Manninger signed for Bundesliga club FC Augsburg to cover for an injury to regular first-choice goalkeeper Simon Jentzsch. He made his competitive debut for Augsburg in a DFB-Pokal home match against Bayern Munich on 18 December 2012. In 2014, he signed a one–year contract extension and was released at the end of his contract in June 2016 after having made 38 appearances in all competitions for the German side during his time with the team, 36 of which came in the Bundesliga.

=== Liverpool ===
During July 2016, Manninger trained with Liverpool to maintain match fitness and on 22 July 2016, he signed a short-term contract with the Merseyside club and made two appearances in pre-season friendlies. On 25 May 2017, he announced his retirement from football at the end of his contract.

== International career ==
Manninger made his debut for the Austria national team in an August 1999 friendly match against Sweden and was member of the Austrian UEFA Euro 2008 squad. He earned 33 caps and retired after ten years from international football for Austria on 5 August 2009.

== Style of play ==
Manninger was known in particular for his shot-stopping, consistency, handling, and positional sense as a goalkeeper, although he was less effective at coming out to collect crosses. In his early career, he was considered to be a good back-up keeper, but was occasionally accused by pundits of lacking the ability to cope with pressure which was necessary for him to succeed in a starting role. He also stood out for his professionalism.

== Personal life and death ==
Before playing football, Manninger was a carpenter. After retiring from professional football, he focused on his work in furniture and real estate. One such real estate venture for Manninger included significant holdings in Meininger Hotels, a subsidiary of Holidaybreak. Manninger was married and had two sons.

On the morning of 16 April 2026, Manninger was alone driving a car that was struck by a passenger train at a level crossing without barriers in Nußdorf am Haunsberg, near Salzburg. He survived the impact but died from his injuries soon after the paramedics arrived.

== Career statistics ==
=== Club ===
Appearances and goals by club, season and competition
Club	Season	League			National cup (Note: Includes FA Cup, Coppa Italia, DFB-Pokal)		League cup (Note: Includes Football League Cup)		Europe		Other		Total	
Club	Season	Division	Apps	Goals	Apps	Goals	Apps	Goals	Apps	Goals	Apps	Goals	Apps	Goals
SV Salzburg	1995–96	Austrian Bundesliga	1	0	0	0	—		—		—		1	0
Vorwärts Steyr (loan)	1995–96	Austrian Bundesliga	5	0	0	0	—		—		—		5	0
Grazer AK	1996–97	Austrian Bundesliga	23	0	0	0	—		0	0	—		23	0
Arsenal	1997–98	Premier League	7	0	5	0	4	0	0	0	—		16	0
Arsenal	1998–99	Premier League	6	0	2	0	2	0	0	0	0	0	10	0
Arsenal	1999–2000	Premier League	15	0	1	0	1	0	6 (Note: Four appearances in UEFA Champions League, two appearances in UEFA Cup)	0	1 (Note: Appearance in Community Shield)	0	24	0
Arsenal	2000–01	Premier League	11	0	1	0	0	0	2 (Note: Appearances in UEFA Champions League)	0	—		14	0
Arsenal	Total		39	0	9	0	7	0	8	0	1	0	64	0
Fiorentina (loan)	2001–02	Serie A	24	0	0	0	—		6 (Note: Appearances in UEFA Cup)	0	0	0	30	0
Torino	2002–03	Serie A	3	0	—		—		—		—		3	0
Bologna	2003–04	Serie A	0	0	4	0	—		—		—		4	0
Siena (loan)	2004–05	Serie A	19	0	2	0	—		—		—		21	0
Red Bull Salzburg	2005–06	Austrian Bundesliga	16	0	0	0	—		—		—		16	0
Siena	2006–07	Serie A	38	0	0	0	—		—		—		38	0
Siena	2007–08	Serie A	26	0	0	0	—		—		—		26	0
Siena	Total		64	0	0	0	—		—		—		64	0
Juventus	2008–09	Serie A	16	0	0	0	—		5	0	—		21	0
Juventus	2009–10	Serie A	11	0	1	0	—		2 (Note: Appearances in UEFA Europa League)	0	—		14	0
Juventus	2010–11	Serie A	0	0	0	0	—		5	0	—		5	0
Juventus	2011–12	Serie A	0	0	0	0	—		—		—		0	0
Juventus	Total		27	0	1	0	—		12	0	—		40	0
FC Augsburg	2012–13	Bundesliga	12	0	1	0	—		—		—		13	0
FC Augsburg	2013–14	Bundesliga	13	0	1	0	—		—		—		14	0
FC Augsburg	2014–15	Bundesliga	9	0	0	0	—		—		—		9	0
FC Augsburg	2015–16	Bundesliga	2	0	0	0	—		0	0	—		2	0
FC Augsburg	Total		36	0	2	0	—		0	0	—		38	0
Liverpool	2016–17	Premier League	0	0	0	0	0	0	0	0	—		0	0
Career total			257	0	18	0	7	0	26	0	1	0	309	0

=== International ===
Appearances and goals by national team and year
National team	Year	Apps	Goals
Austria	1999	3	0
Austria	2000	2	0
Austria	2001	3	0
Austria	2002	6	0
Austria	2004	4	0
Austria	2006	1	0
Austria	2007	6	0
Austria	2008	7	0
Austria	2009	1	0
Total		33	0

== Honours ==
Arsenal

- Premier League: 1997–98
- FA Cup: 1997–98
- FA Charity Shield: 1998, 1999

Juventus

- Serie A: 2011–12

Individual

- Premier League Player of the Month: March 1998
