= Alberto Méndez (footballer) =

German footballer (born 1974)

Personal information
- Full name: Alberto Méndez Rodríguez
- Date of birth: 24 October 1974 (age 51)
- Place of birth: Nuremberg, West Germany
- Height: 1.80 m (5 ft 11 in)
- Position: Midfielder

Senior career*
| Years | Team | Apps | (Gls) |
| 1996–1997 | SC Feucht | | |
| 1997–2002 | Arsenal | 4 | (0) |
| 1999 | → AEK Athens (loan) | 11 | (0) |
| 1999–2000 | → SpVgg Unterhaching (loan) | 6 | (0) |
| 2001–2002 | → Racing Ferrol (loan) | 17 | (2) |
| 2002–2003 | Racing Ferrol | 33 | (4) |
| 2003–2004 | Terrassa | 14 | (1) |
| 2004–2005 | SC Feucht | 19 | (5) |
| 2005–2006 | SpVgg Bayreuth | 21 | (3) |
| 2006–2007 | Darmstadt 98 | 27 | (8) |
| 2007–2008 | SV Sandhausen | 23 | (4) |
| 2009–2010 | SpVgg Weiden | 26 | (7) |
| Total | | 201 | (34) |

Managerial career
- 2011–2013: FC Amberg
- * Club domestic league appearances and goals

Alberto Méndez Rodríguez (born 24 October 1974) is a German former professional footballer who played as a midfielder.

== Career ==
Born in Nuremberg, West Germany of Galician descent, Méndez was discovered by Arsenal and Arsène Wenger playing for German non-league side 1. SC Feucht, and signed for the English club in the 1997 summer. He made his debut with the main squad in a League Cup match against Birmingham City on 14 October as a substitute, and scored the final goal in a 4–1 home win.

However, Méndez could not establish himself in the Gunners' first team, and played in only eleven official matches – four of which were in the league – in five seasons, with one goal to his name. He had subsequent spells with AEK Athens, SpVgg Unterhaching (his only Bundesliga experience, which consisted in six appearances from the bench during the 1999–2000 campaign), Racing de Ferrol and Terrassa FC, the latter two in Spain's second division, before returning to Germany permanently in 2004, playing in the lower leagues well into his 30s.

Méndez joined Bavarian amateur club FC Amberg as a coach in 2011, but was dismissed in April 2013 despite considerable success overall.
