= David Lacey =

British journalist (1938–2021)

David Edward Charles Lacey (4 January 1938 – 15 November 2021) was a British journalist and football writer. He spent the majority of his career at The Guardian, serving as chief football correspondent from 1973 until 2002.

== Early life ==
Lacey was born in Lewes, Sussex, to Hilda (a librarian) and Leslie Lacey (a journalist), on 4 January 1938. His father was the editor of the local newspaper, the Sussex Express, and his two brothers, Jeremy and Roger, also went into journalism.

He attended Lewes county grammar school.

== Career ==
Lacey completed his national service in the Royal Air Force, but did not fly planes or see combat. His first role in journalism was as a cub reporter for the Brighton Evening Argus, aged 16, and he also worked as a subeditor for the Brighton Gazette. His first bylines for the Brighton Evening Argus were as 'Dave Lacey' on 8 September 1960, on an article about Sussex clubs drawn in the F.A. Cup and a match report of a Sussex County League game at Lancing.

He joined The Guardian as a subeditor in 1964, with his byline first appearing on 23 November 1964, on a report on a goalless draw between Coventry City and Crystal Palace in the Second Division. Lacey was appointed chief football correspondent for The Guardian in 1973, a position he held until his partial retirement in 2002; he continued to write for the paper until 2013.

He covered ten world cups for the paper, covering every tournament from 1966, won by England on home soil, until Korea Japan 2002, won by Brazil. He reported from the Heysel Stadium in Brussels, when 39 people died following a crush in 1985, and was in the ground at Hillsborough Stadium in Sheffield when 96 people were killed in a similar incident in 1989. In his almost five decades with The Guardian he published game previews, match reports, profiles, features and columns, and became particularly known for his weekly synopsis and analysis of the weekend's action, published in his Monday column.

He was named sports reporter of the year at the British Press Awards in 1997 and 2003. He is sometimes described as one of the greats of football writing, and the best football writer in the English language.

Lacey died in a care home in St Ives, Cambridgeshire, England, on 15 November 2021, aged 83.
