= Gilles Grimandi =

French footballer (born 1970)

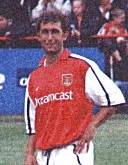
- Grimandi playing for Arsenal

Personal information
- Full name: Gilles Jean-Christophe Grimandi
- Date of birth: 11 November 1970 (age 56)
- Place of birth: Gap, France
- Height: 1.78 m (5 ft 10 in)
- Positions: Centre back; midfielder

Youth career
- 1987–1988: Gap

Senior career*
Years	Team	Apps	(Gls)
1988–1991	Gap		
1991–1997	Monaco	80	(3)
1997–2002	Arsenal	114	(4)
2003	Colorado Rapids	0	(0)
Total		194	(7)
- * Club domestic league appearances and goals

Gilles Jean-Christophe Grimandi (born 11 November 1970) is a French former professional footballer who played as a centre back or midfielder.

In his playing career, he went from hometown team Gap to top-flight Monaco before arriving at Arsenal of the Premier League in 1997. He won two league-and-cup doubles with them before leaving in 2002.

== Early life and playing career ==
Gilles Jean-Christophe Grimandi was born on 11 November 1970 in Gap, Hautes-Alpes.

Grimandi began his professional career with Monaco in 1990 and made his first-team debut in 1991 against Nancy in Division 1. His career briefly interrupted by French military service, he went on to make 80 appearances and score three goals for the club, mostly as a centre back. He helped the club reach both a UEFA Champions League and a UEFA Cup semifinal, and won the league title in 1996–97.

The following season, Grimandi left to join his former manager Arsène Wenger at Arsenal, making his debut at Elland Road against Leeds United, and helped achieve The Double in his first season. He made 113 league appearances as a midfielder, centre back, and right wingback, winning a second Double in his final season (2001–02) with the club. Grimandi scored six goals in all competitions for Arsenal during his time at the club, including a burst of three goals in three games in December 1999.

Grimandi signed with the Colorado Rapids of Major League Soccer on 8 January 2003, after turning down an offer from Middlesbrough. Grimandi was the first Frenchman to sign for MLS, and played a pre-season friendly against Santos Laguna of Mexico on 12 March. On 30 April he quit the club for family reasons to return to France. The Rapids' management described themselves as "deeply saddened" by his decision.

== Post-playing career ==
Grimandi has remained active in the sport, taking his first administrative position in 2004 as football director at ASOA Valence. Valence were playing in the Championnats National, the French third division at the time of his appointment. Grimandi became a French-based scout for Arsenal in 2006. He also took part in Dennis Bergkamp's testimonial game at Arsenal's new Emirates Stadium in July of that year, making a controversial tackle on Edgar Davids as the Dutchman looked to tap into an empty net to open the scoring for Ajax.

Grimandi was linked with a director of football position at Arsenal in July 2007, in charge of acquiring new players. However, no appointment to the role was made.

In March 2019, Grimandi left his position at Arsenal to become technical director at Nice, joining forces with former teammate Patrick Vieira. Grimandi resigned by mutual agreement on 7 October 2019.

== Career statistics ==
Appearances and goals by club, season and competition
Club	Season	League			Cup (Note: Includes Coupe de France, Coupe de la Ligue, FA Community Shield, EFL Cup and FA Cup.)		Continental (Note: Includes UEFA Champions League and UEFA Cup.)		Total	
Club	Season	Division	Apps	Goals	Apps	Goals	Apps	Goals	Apps	Goals
Monaco	1991–92	Division 1	5	0	0	0	–		5	0
Monaco	1992–93	Division 1	8	0	0	0	–		8	0
Monaco	1993–94	Division 1	19	1	2	0	7	0	28	1
Monaco	1994–95	Division 1	9	0	2	1	–		11	1
Monaco	1995–96	Division 1	15	1	4	0	–		19	1
Monaco	1996–97	Division 1	24	1	2	0	6	0	32	1
Monaco	Total		80	3	10	1	13	0	103	4
Arsenal	1997–98	Premier League	22	1	9	0	–		31	1
Arsenal	1998–99	Premier League	8	0	4	0	2	0	14	0
Arsenal	1999–2000	Premier League	28	2	5	1	10	1	43	4
Arsenal	2000–01	Premier League	30	1	3	0	8	0	41	1
Arsenal	2001–02	Premier League	26	0	6	0	8	0	40	0
Arsenal	Total		114	4	27	1	28	1	169	6
Career total			194	7	37	1	41	1	272	10

== Honours ==
Monaco

- Division 1: 1996–97

Arsenal

- Premier League: 1997–98, 2001–02
- FA Cup: 1997–98; runner-up: 2000–01
- FA Charity Shield: 1998, 1999
- UEFA Cup runner-up: 1999–2000
