= Football records and statistics in England =

This article concerns football records in England. Unless otherwise stated, records are taken from the Football League or Premier League. Where a different record exists for the top flight (Football League First Division 1888–1992, and Premier League 1992–present), this is also given. This article includes clubs based in Wales that compete in English leagues.

== League ==
The original league saw twelve teams become the founding members of the Football League in 1888–89: Accrington, Blackburn Rovers, Bolton Wanderers, Burnley, Everton, Preston North End, Aston Villa, Derby County, Notts County, Stoke, West Bromwich Albion, and Wolverhampton Wanderers.

Three of the teams (Blackburn Rovers, Everton, and Aston Villa) also played in the first Premier League season in 1992–93, but Notts County missed out, finishing in the relegation zone in 1991–92.

A second division was added four years later for the 1892–93 season, resulting in the Football League now becoming the Football League First Division, the top division for the next one hundred years. The Southern League became Division 3 in 1920. A Northern League formed the following year that became Division Three North. In 1958, the regional divisions combined to form the Third Division and a national Fourth Division. The top twelve sides from the Northern and Southern divisions formed the Third Division, whilst the bottom twelve of the respective divisions formed the new fourth tier.

Nine clubs have reached double figures of league titles, with Liverpool and Manchester United leading the chasing pack, having won twenty titles each. Five clubs have managed to win all four divisions, while a further seven clubs need the top title to complete the full set. Luton Town have technically also won four different divisions, albeit one of these was the National League (the first tier of English non-league football) in 2014.

Top 10 clubs by league titles won
| Rank | Club | Division 1: Premier League | Division 2: Championship | Division 3: League One | Division 4: League Two | Totals |
|---|---|---|---|---|---|---|
| 1 | Liverpool | 20 | 4 | | | 24 |
| 2 | Manchester United | 20 | 2 | | | 22 |
| 3 | Arsenal | 14 | | | | 14 |
| 4 | Manchester City | 10 | 7 | | | 17 |
| 5 | Everton | 9 | 1 | | | 10 |
| 6 | Aston Villa | 7 | 2 | 1 | | 10 |
| 7 | Sunderland | 6 | 5 | 1 | | 12 |
| 8 | Sheffield Wednesday | 4 | 5 | | | 9 |
| 9 | Wolverhampton Wanderers | 3 | 4 | 3 | 1 | 11 |
| 10 | Leicester City | 1 | 8 | 1 | | 10 |

Clubs winning all four divisions
| Rank | Club | Division 1: Premier League | Division 2: Championship | Division 3: League One | Division 4: League Two |
|---|---|---|---|---|---|
| 1 | Wolverhampton Wanderers | 3 | 4 | 3 | 1 |
| 2 | Burnley | 2 | 4 | 1 | 1 |
| 3 | Preston North End | 2 | 3 | 2 | 1 |
| 4 | Portsmouth | 2 | 1 | 3 | 1 |
| 5 | Sheffield United | 1 | 1 | 1 | 1 |

Clubs winning bottom three divisions
| Rank | Club | Division 2: Championship | Division 3: League One | Division 4: League Two |
|---|---|---|---|---|
| 1 | Notts County | 3 | 2 | 3 |
| 2 | Grimsby Town | 2 | 3 | 1 |
| 3 | Reading | 2 | 3 | 1 |
| 4 | Brentford | 1 | 2 | 3 |
| 5 | Luton Town | 1 | 3 | 1 |
| 6 | Millwall | 1 | 3 | 1 |
| 7 | Cardiff City | 1 | 1 | 1 |

For the 1919–20 season, the first season after the First World War, Arsenal were controversially elected in to the first division, despite finishing fifth in the last season before the outbreak of war in the second division. However, they have remained at this level ever since. Arsenal had once previously won promotion after finishing second behind Preston North End in the 1903–04 season, staying there until finishing bottom in 1912–13. Other clubs won elections to play in the first division: Blackburn Rovers and Newcastle United in 1898, Bury and Notts County in 1905, and Chelsea (alongside Arsenal) in 1919 were also elected to the top flight. Blackburn later won Division 2 in 1938–39, and Newcastle United finished runners-up in 1947–48. Notts County became second division champions in 1913–14, while Bury would finish runners-up in 1923–24. In the 1929–30 season, Chelsea finished second behind Blackpool. Arsenal, still to this day, have the unenviable record as being the only club who have never earned their place in the top flight, through their league position, after being elected in the 1919–20 season.

Holding the record of continuous seasons, Arsenal are some way ahead of other clubs who have suffered relegation. Everton spent three years in the second division before finishing as runners-up to Leicester City in the 1953–54 season. Neighbours Liverpool, after having spent eight years outside the top division, won the second division title in the 1961–62 season. Manchester United bounced straight back up in 1974–75, after finishing second bottom in 1973–74. This would be Manchester United's last football league title before the birth of the Premier League, in their only time outside the top division since the end of the Second World War. Tottenham Hotspur also spent a season in the Second Division; similarly to Manchester United, it is the only time they have been outside the top flight since 1950. In 1976–77, Tottenham conceded 72 goals as they finished bottom; the following season, they finished third in the second division to earn promotion back to the top flight. Chelsea have been in the top flight since 1989 after winning the second division, while Manchester City one of the founders of the Premier League, spent five years out of the top flight but have been present since their 2002 promotion as Division 1 (second tier) winners. The 1998–99 season saw Manchester City earn promotion from Division 2 (currently known as League One), after winning a penalty shoot-out against Gillingham in the play-off final. City finished as runners-up to Charlton Athletic in Division 1 (currently known as the Championship) the following season, then made an immediate return after relegation in 2001, before securing their seventh second division title.

Unlike many European clubs that have never played outside their country's top division, no English club can claim that achievement. 65 clubs have played at the top level, six clubs have never returned, and the rest, apart from Arsenal, have secured promotion from the second division. Glossop, Leyton Orient, Northampton Town, Carlisle United, Swindon Town, and Barnsley have completed only one season in the top flight. The club that can boast playing the most seasons in the top tier is Everton, who are playing their 124th season there (out of a possible 128 league seasons). The city of Liverpool has always been represented in football's top tier; while Everton suffered relegation in 1930, Liverpool remained, though Everton instantly returned to the top flight a year later. After three years in the second division from 1951 to 1954, Everton won promotion to the First Division, swapping places with Liverpool who had been relegated; it would be eight years later that under Bill Shankly, Liverpool were promoted from the second division.

Top ten clubs by total number of seasons (ever) in top flight*
| Rank | Club | No. seasons |
|---|---|---|
| 1 | Everton | 124 |
| 2 | Aston Villa | 113 |
| 3 | Liverpool | 112 |
| 4 | Arsenal | 110 |
| 5 | Manchester United | 102 |
| 6 | Manchester City | 98 |
| 7 | Newcastle United | 95 |
| 8 | Chelsea | 92 |
| 8 | Tottenham Hotspur | 92 |
| 10 | Sunderland | 89 |

* Division 1 and Premier League, as of the 2026–27 season

Top ten clubs by number of ongoing, successive seasons in top flight*
| Rank | Club | First season | No. seasons |
|---|---|---|---|
| 1 | Arsenal | 1919–20 | 107** |
| 2 | Everton | 1954–55 | 73 |
| 3 | Liverpool | 1962–63 | 65 |
| 4 | Manchester United | 1975–76 | 52 |
| 5 | Tottenham Hotspur | 1978–79 | 49 |
| 6 | Chelsea | 1989–90 | 38 |
| 7 | Manchester City | 2002–03 | 25 |
| 8 | Crystal Palace | 2013–14 | 14 |
| 9 | Brighton & Hove Albion | 2017–18 | 10 |
| 9 | Newcastle United | 2017–18 | 10 |
| 10 | Aston Villa | 2019–20 | 8 |

* Division 1 and Premier League, as of the 2026–27 season

** Six seasons lost due to World War II, and one season abandoned.

Clubs by number of successive seasons (ever) in top flight*
| Rank | Club | First season | Season relegated | No. seasons |
|---|---|---|---|---|
| 1 | Arsenal | 1919–20 | | 107** |
| 2 | Everton | 1954–55 | | 73 |
| 3 | Liverpool | 1962–63 | | 65 |
| 4 | Sunderland | 1890–91 | 1957–58 | 57 |
| 5 | Manchester United | 1975–76 | | 52 |
| 6 | Tottenham Hotspur | 1978–79 | | 49 |
| 7 | Aston Villa | 1888–89 | 1935–36 | 43 |
| 7 | Blackburn Rovers | 1888–89 | 1935–36 | 43 |
| 9 | Chelsea | 1989–90 | | 38 |
| 10 | Sheffield United | 1893–94 | 1933–34 | 36 |

* Division 1 and Premier League, as of the 2026–27 season

** Six seasons lost due to World War II, and one season abandoned.

=== Champions of England ===
24 different football clubs have been crowned English champions since the league began in 1888. In 2020, Liverpool ended a 30-year wait to become league champions again; however, this is nowhere near the longest wait in history to once again be the English champions. Preston North End won the first two top flight league titles, but have not won since 1890. Sheffield United won in 1898, but no second title has yet arrived. Their neighbours, Sheffield Wednesday, have won the league more recently than them, but have not added to their tally of four league titles, with their most recent success coming in 1930. Huddersfield Town won a hat-trick of titles between 1924 and 1926, but now over a century later no fourth title has been added.

It is approaching 100 years since Newcastle United were English champions, while Tottenham Hotspur have now gone 65 years without any league titles. Chelsea had to wait 50 years before their first Premier League success in 2005, although they did win the second division twice in the 1980s.

Manchester City went 44 years without a title before winning the league in 2012. Manchester United went 41 years without a top flight title, but that time period includes two World Wars, with eleven seasons lost. Since first becoming English champions in 1931, Arsenal had their longest period of 22 years without a league title between 2004 and 2026. They also went 18 years without a title twice, between 1953 and 1971, then again until 1989.

In the lower leagues, Leicester City hold the record for most second tier titles with eight, overtaking Manchester City's tally of seven, with six of those won by 1966. Behind are Sunderland, Sheffield Wednesday, and Norwich City, all with five. The third tier record is held by Plymouth Argyle with five titles; winning League One in the 2022–23 season moved them to outright holders, ahead of Portsmouth, Bristol City, Doncaster Rovers, Wigan Athletic, Hull City, and Lincoln City. Doncaster Rovers and Chesterfield share the fourth tier record, both with four titles, ahead of Notts County, Brentford, and Swindon Town, with three titles each.

Clubs that have been champions of England^{†}
| Club | First title | Longest time between titles | | Years | Current time since last title | |
| Club | First title | From | Until | Years | Last title won | Years |
|---|---|---|---|---|---|---|
| Preston North End ** | 1888–89 | | | | 1889–90 | 136 |
| Sunderland * | 1891–92 | 1912–13 | 1935–36 | 23 | 1935–36 | 90 |
| Aston Villa ** | 1893–94 | 1909–10 | 1980–81 | 71 | 1980–81 | 45 |
| Sheffield United ** | 1897–98 | | | | 1897–98 | 128 |
| Liverpool | 1900–01 | 1989–90 | 2019–20 | 30 | 2024–25 | 1 |
| Sheffield Wednesday * | 1902–03 | 1903–04 | 1928–29 | 25 | 1929–30 | 96 |
| Newcastle United * | 1904–05 | 1908–09 | 1926–27 | 18 | 1926–27 | 99 |
| Manchester United ** | 1907–08 | 1910–11 | 1951–52 | 41 | 2012–13 | 13 |
| Blackburn Rovers ** | 1911–12 | 1913–14 | 1994–95 | 81 | 1994–95 | 31 |
| West Bromwich Albion * | 1919–20 | | | | 1919–20 | 106 |
| Burnley | 1920–21 | 1920–21 | 1959–60 | 39 | 1959–60 | 66 |
| Huddersfield Town * | 1923–24 | 1923–24 | 1925–26 | | 1925–26 | 100 |
| Arsenal | 1930–31 | 2003–04 | 2025–26 | 22 | 2025–26 | 0 |
| Manchester City | 1936–37 | 1967–68 | 2011–12 | 44 | 2023–24 | 2 |
| Portsmouth | 1948–49 | | | | 1949–50 | 76 |
| Tottenham Hotspur | 1950–51 | 1950–51 | 1960–61 | 10 | 1960–61 | 65 |
| Wolverhampton Wanderers | 1953–54 | 1953–54 | 1957–58 | 4 | 1958–59 | 67 |
| Chelsea | 1954–55 | 1954–55 | 2004–05 | 50 | 2016–17 | 9 |
| Ipswich Town | 1961–62 | | | | 1961–62 | 64 |
| Derby County | 1971–72 | 1971–72 | 1974–75 | 3 | 1974–75 | 51 |
| Nottingham Forest | 1977–78 | | | | 1977–78 | 48 |
| Everton | 1890–91 | 1890–91 | 1914–15 | 24 | 1986–87 | 39 |
| Leeds United | 1968–69 | 1973–74 | 1991–92 | 18 | 1991–92 | 34 |
| Leicester City | 2015–16 | | | | 2015–16 | 10 |

- * 4 seasons lost due to World War I
- ** 11 seasons lost due to World War I and World War II
- ^{†} At end of the 2025–26 season

Legend
| Same season as first title |
| Same season as last title |

=== Titles ===
- Most consecutive league titles: 4, Manchester City (2020–21 to 2023–24)
- Most top flight titles (Division 1; Premier League): 20
  - Liverpool
  - Manchester United
- Most second tier titles (Division 2; Championship): 8, Leicester City
- Most third tier titles (Division 3; League One): 5, Plymouth Argyle
- Most fourth tier titles (Division 4; League Two): 4
  - Chesterfield
  - Doncaster Rovers

=== Representation ===
- Most participants in top flight from one county: During three consecutive seasons between 1919 and 1921, the historic boundaries (pre-1974) of the County of Lancashire had nine participants in the top flight: Blackburn Rovers, Bolton Wanderers, Burnley, Everton, Liverpool, Manchester City, Manchester United, Oldham Athletic, and Preston North End. In the Premier League era, there were eight participants in the historic county of Lancashire in both the 2009–10 and the 2010–11 seasons: Blackburn Rovers, Burnley (2009–10), Blackpool (2010–11), Bolton Wanderers, Everton, Liverpool, Manchester City, Manchester United, and Wigan Athletic.
- Most participants in top flight from one city: During the 1989–90 season, London had eight entrants in the top flight: Arsenal, Charlton Athletic, Chelsea, Crystal Palace, Millwall, Queens Park Rangers, Tottenham Hotspur, and Wimbledon.
- City represented with most seasons in top flight: Liverpool (the city has always had a top flight member of either Everton or Liverpool)

=== Wins ===
- Most wins overall in the top flight: 2,072, Liverpool
- Most consecutive wins from start of a top flight season: 11, Tottenham Hotspur (First Division, 1960–61)
- Most consecutive wins from start of a season: 13, Reading (Third Division, 1985–86)
- Most consecutive top flight league wins: 18
  - Manchester City (26 August 2017 to 27 December 2017)
  - Liverpool (27 October 2019 to 24 February 2020)
- Most consecutive top flight league wins at home: 24, Liverpool (Premier League, 9 February 2019 to 11 July 2020)
- Most consecutive top flight league wins away: 12, Manchester City (Premier League, 19 December 2020 to 14 May 2021)
- Most consecutive home wins: 25, Bradford Park Avenue (Third Division North, 1926–27)
- Most consecutive wins in all competitions by a top flight side: 21, Manchester City (19 December 2020 to 2 March 2021)
- Most wins in a top flight season: 32
  - Manchester City (Premier League, 2017–18 and 2018–19)
  - Liverpool (Premier League, 2019–20)

=== Draws ===
- Most draws overall in the top flight: 1,188, Everton
- Most draws in a season: 23
  - Norwich City (in 42 matches, First Division, 1978–79)
  - Exeter City (in 46 matches, Fourth Division, 1986–87)
  - Hartlepool United (in 46 matches, Third Division, 1997–98)
  - Cardiff City (in 46 matches, Third Division, 1997–98)
- Most consecutive draws: 8
  - Torquay United (Third Division, 1969–70)
  - Middlesbrough (Second Division, 1970–71)
  - Peterborough United (Fourth Division, 1971–72)
  - Birmingham City (Third Division, 1990–91)
  - Chesterfield (League One, 2005–06)
  - Southampton (Championship, 2005–06)
  - Swansea City (Championship, 2008–09)

=== Losses ===
- Most losses overall in the top flight: 1,635, Everton
- Fewest losses in a season: 0
  - Preston North End (First Division, 1888–89; 18 wins and 4 draws in 22 matches)
  - Liverpool (Second Division, 1893–94; 22 wins and 6 draws in 28 matches)
  - Arsenal (Premier League, 2003–04; 26 wins and 12 draws in 38 matches)
- Most consecutive losses: 18, Darwen (Second Division, 1898–99)

=== Points ===
- Most points overall in the top flight (mixed 3 points and 2 points for win): 7,290, Liverpool
- Most points in a season (2 points for a win – 46 matches): 74, Lincoln City (Fourth Division, 1975–76)
- Most points in a season (3 points for a win – 46 matches): 111, Birmingham City (League One, 2024–25)
- Most points in a season for a second division team (3 points for a win – 46 matches): 106, Reading (Championship, 2005–06)
- Most points in a season for a third division team (3 points for a win – 46 matches): 111, Birmingham City (League One, 2024–25)
- Most points in a season for a fourth division team (3 points for a win – 46 matches): 102
  - Swindon Town (Fourth Division, 1985–86)
  - Plymouth Argyle (Third Division, 2001–02)
- Most points in a season for a top flight team (2 points for a win – 42 matches): 68, Liverpool (First Division, 1978–79)
- Most points in a season for a top flight team (3 points for a win – 38 matches): 100, Manchester City (Premier League, 2017–18)
- Most points in a season without winning the title for a top flight team: 97, Liverpool (Premier League, 2018–19)
- Most points in a season without winning the title: 100, Burnley (Championship, 2024–25)
- Fewest points in a season (2 points for a win – 34 matches): 8
  - Loughborough (Second Division, 1899–1900)
  - Doncaster Rovers (Second Division, 1904–05)
- Fewest points in a season (3 points for a win – 38 matches): 11, Derby County (Premier League, 2007–08)
- Fewest points in a season with a points deduction (3 points for a win – 46 matches): 0 (after a −18 deduction), Sheffield Wednesday (Championship, 2025–26)
- Most points in a season while being relegated (2 points for a win – 46 matches): 41, Rotherham United (Third Division, 1972–73)
- Most points in a season while being relegated (3 points for a win – 46 matches): 54
  - Southend United (Third Division, 21st of 24; 1988–89)
  - Peterborough United (Championship, 22nd of 24; 2012–13)
- Most points in a season while being relegated (3 points for a win – 42 matches): 49
  - Norwich City (First Division, 20th of 22; 1984–85)
  - Crystal Palace (FA Premiership, 19th of 22; 1994–95)
- Most points in a season while being relegated (3 points for a win – 38 matches): 43, Sheffield Wednesday (First Division, 18th of 20; 1989–90)

=== Matches without a win ===
- Most consecutive league matches without a win: 39, Sheffield Wednesday (Championship, 27 September 2025 to 2 May 2026)
- Longest run without a home win: 23 matches
  - Sheffield Wednesday (Championship, 21 April 2025 to 2 May 2026)
  - Burnley (Premier League and Championship, 18 October 2025 to present)
- Longest run without an away win: 61 matches, Merthyr Town (Third Division South), 1922 to 1925

=== Matches without defeat ===
- Most consecutive matches without a defeat in top flight: 49, Arsenal (Premier League, 7 May 2003 to 24 October 2004)
- Most consecutive matches without a defeat at home: 86, Chelsea (Premier League, 21 February 2004 to 26 October 2008)
- Most consecutive matches without a defeat away: 29, Manchester United (Premier League, 17 February 2020 to 16 October 2021)

=== Goals ===
- Most league goals scored in a season: 134, Peterborough United (Fourth Division, 1960–61)
- Most top flight goals scored in a season (42 matches): 128, Aston Villa (First Division, 1930–31)
- Most top flight goals scored in a season (38 matches): 106, Manchester City (Premier League, 2017–18)
- Most goals scored in all competitions in a season by a top flight side: 169, Manchester City (in 61 matches, 2018–19)
- Most top flight goals scored in total: 7,316, Liverpool
- Most home league goals scored in a season: 87, Millwall (Third Division South, 1927–28)
- Most away league goals scored in a season: 60, Arsenal (First Division, 1930–31)
- Most consecutive matches scoring: 55, Arsenal (Premier League, 19 May 2001 to 30 November 2002)
- Most consecutive matches without scoring: 11
  - Coventry City (Second Division, 1919–20)
  - Hartlepool United (Third Division, 1992–93)
  - Cheltenham Town (League One, 2023–24)
- Most consecutive matches from start of season without scoring: 11, Cheltenham Town (League One, 2023–24)
- First league goal awarded by goal-line technology: scored by Edin Džeko for Manchester City against Cardiff City in the 14th minute on 18 January 2014; 2014–15 Premier League (the match was officiated by Neil Swarbrick, who consulted his watch when Cardiff defender Kevin McNaughton quickly cleared the ball away just after it entered the goal)
- Lowest goals conceded ratio in a season: 0.35, Burnley (Championship, 2024–25; 16 goals conceded in 46 matches); Burnley also became the first side in English league history not to concede more than one goal in any fixture throughout an entire season

=== Scorelines ===
- Record win: 13–0
  - Stockport County 13–0 Halifax Town (Third Division North, 6 January 1934)
  - Newcastle United 13–0 Newport County (Second Division, 5 October 1946)
- Record win in top flight: 12–0
  - West Bromwich Albion 12–0 Darwen (First Division, 4 April 1892)
  - Nottingham Forest 12–0 Leicester Fosse (First Division, 21 April 1909)
- Record away win: Port Vale 0–10 Sheffield United (Second Division, 10 December 1892)
- Record away win in top flight: Southampton 0–9 Leicester City (Premier League, 25 October 2019)
- Highest aggregate score: Tranmere Rovers 13–4 Oldham Athletic (Third Division North, 26 December 1935)
- Highest scoring draw: 6–6
  - Leicester City 6–6 Arsenal (First Division, 21 April 1930)
  - Charlton Athletic 6–6 Middlesbrough (Second Division, 22 October 1960)
- Most goals scored by a losing side: 6 by Huddersfield Town losing 7–6 to Charlton Athletic (Second Division, 21 December 1957)
- Most double-figure scores by a club: 5, Birmingham City (12–0 v. Walsall Town Swifts, 17 December 1892; 10–2 v. Ardwick, 17 March 1894; 10–1 v. Blackpool, 2 March 1901; 12–0 v. Doncaster Rovers, 11 April 1903; 11–1 v. Glossop, 6 January 1915 (all Second Division)
- Most double-figure scores conceded by a club: 4, Darwen (0–12 v. West Bromwich Albion, 4 April 1892; 0–10 v. Manchester City, 18 February 1899; 0–10 v. Walsall, 4 March 1899; 0–10 v. Loughborough, 1 April 1899) (all Second Division except the West Bromwich loss, which was in First Division; Walsall have three double-digit defeats, plus one expunged from the records)

=== Disciplinary ===
- Most red cards in a single match: 5
  - Chesterfield (2) v. Plymouth Argyle (3) (22 February 1997)
  - Wigan Athletic (1) v. Bristol Rovers (4) (2 December 1997)
  - Bradford City (3) v. Crawley Town (2) (27 March 2012) (all after the final whistle)
- Most red cards in a career (individual): 13
  - Roy McDonough (for Colchester United, Exeter City, and Southend United)
  - Steve Walsh (for Wigan Athletic and Leicester City)
- Fastest red card: 13 seconds, Kevin Pressman (for Sheffield Wednesday v. Wolverhampton Wanderers, 13 August 2000)
- Fastest yellow card: 0 seconds (at the kick-off), Carlo Corazzin (for Cambridge United v. Lincoln City, 9 December 1995)
- Fastest red card for a substitute on the field of play: 0 seconds
  - Walter Boyd (for Swansea City, 12 March 2000)
  - Keith Gillespie (for Sheffield United, 20 January 2007)
  Both players came on as substitutes and elbowed/pushed an opponent before the matches had been restarted.

=== Transfers ===
- Highest transfer fee received: £142 million (including bonuses), Philippe Coutinho, from Liverpool to Barcelona (7 January 2018)
- Highest transfer fee paid: £125 million: Alexander Isak, from Newcastle United to Liverpool (1 September 2025)

=== Individual ===
==== Appearances ====
- Most career league appearances: 1,005, Peter Shilton (record 848 in top flight)
- Most career league appearances by an outfield player: 931, Tony Ford (1975 to 2002)
- Most career league appearances at one club: 789, Dean Lewington (for Milton Keynes Dons, 2004 to 2025)
- Most career top flight league appearances by an outfield player: 714, John Hollins (1963 to 1984)
- Most career top flight league appearances at one club: 672, Ryan Giggs (for Manchester United, 2 March 1991 to 6 May 2014)
- Most career consecutive league appearances: 375, Harold Bell (for Tranmere Rovers, 1946 to 1955; 401 consecutive club matches including 26 FA Cup appearances)

==== Goals ====
- Most career league goals: 434, Arthur Rowley (in 619 matches, for West Bromwich Albion, Fulham, Leicester City, and Shrewsbury Town, 1946 to 1965)
- Most career top flight goals: 357, Jimmy Greaves (in 516 matches, for Chelsea, Tottenham Hotspur, and West Ham United, 1957 to 1971)
- Most consecutive top flight league matches scored in: 15, Stan Mortensen (for Blackpool, 1950–51)
- Most league goals in a season: 60, Dixie Dean (for Everton, 1927–28)
- Most league goals in a season (second tier): 59, George Camsell (for Middlesbrough, 1926–27)
- Most league goals in a season (third tier North): 55, Ted Harston (for Mansfield Town, 1936–37)
- Most league goals in a season (third tier South): 55, Joe Payne (for Luton Town, 1936–37)
- Most league goals in a season (third tier): 39, Derek Reeves (for Southampton, 1959–60) (third tier since 1958)
- Most league goals in a season (fourth tier): 52, Terry Bly (for Peterborough United, 1960–61)
- Most goals in a match: 10, Joe Payne (for Luton Town v. Bristol Rovers, 13 April 1936)
- Most goals in a top flight match: 7, Ted Drake (for Arsenal v. Aston Villa (away), 14 December 1935)
- Fastest goal: 3.5 seconds, Colin Cowperthwaite (for Barrow v. Kettering Town, 1979)
- Fastest own goal: 6 seconds, Pat Kruse (for Torquay United v. Cambridge United, 15 January 1977)
- Fastest goal on a league debut: 7 seconds, Freddy Eastwood (for Southend United v. Swansea City, 16 October 2004)
- Fastest hat-trick (time between first and third goals): 2 minutes and 21 seconds, James Hayter (for Bournemouth v. Wrexham, 23 February 2004)
- Fastest goal by a substitute: 6 seconds, Nicklas Bendtner (for Arsenal v. Tottenham Hotspur, 22 December 2007)
- Fastest player to 100 English top flight goals: Dave Halliday (101 matches)
- Most consecutive seasons with over 30 league goals: 4, Dave Halliday (1925–26 to 1928–29; he scored at least 35 goals in each of those four seasons)
- Most own goals in one season: 5, Bobby Stuart (for Middlesbrough, 1934–35)
- Most hat-tricks in one season: 9, George Camsell (for Middlesbrough, 1926–27)
- Most career hat-tricks: 37, Dixie Dean (for Tranmere Rovers and Everton, 1923–1937)
- Youngest goalscorer: Ronnie Dix, aged 15 years and 180 days (for Bristol Rovers v. Norwich City, 3 March 1928)
- Youngest top flight goalscorer: Jason Dozzell, aged 16 years and 57 days (for Ipswich Town v. Coventry City, 4 February 1984)
- Oldest top flight goalscorer: Billy Meredith, aged 47 years and 259 days (for Manchester City v. Burnley, 15 April 1922)
- Youngest hat-trick goalscorer: Trevor Francis, aged 16 years and 307 days (for Birmingham City v. Bolton Wanderers, 20 February 1971, Division 2)
- First-ever league hat-trick: William Tait (for Burnley v. Bolton Wanderers, 15 September 1888)

==== Hat-trick of penalties ====
- William McAulay for Walsall v. Luton Town (Second Division, 18 February 1900)
- Billy Walker for Aston Villa v. Bradford City (First Division, 12 November 1921)
- Alf Horne for Lincoln City v. Stockport County (Third Division North, 16 September 1935)
- George Milburn for Chesterfield v. Sheffield Wednesday (Second Division, 7 June 1947)
- Charlie Mitten for Manchester United v. Aston Villa (First Division, 8 March 1950)
- Joe Willetts for Hartlepool United v. Darlington (Third Division North, 23 March 1951)
- Ken Barnes for Manchester City v. Everton (First Division, 7 December 1957)
- Trevor Anderson for Swindon Town v. Walsall (Third Division, 24 April 1976)
- Alan Slough for Peterborough United v. Chester City (Third Division, 29 April 1978)
- Josh Wright for Gillingham v. Scunthorpe United (League One, 11 March 2017)
- Cameron Brannagan for Oxford United v. Gillingham (League One, 29 January 2022; scored 4 penalties)
- Justin Kluivert for Bournemouth v. Wolverhampton Wanderers (Premier League, 30 November 2024)

=== Other records ===
- Oldest player: Neil McBain, aged 51 years and 20 days (for New Brighton v. Hartlepool United, 1947)
- Youngest player: Reuben Noble-Lazarus, aged 15 years and 45 days (for Barnsley v. Ipswich Town, 30 September 2008)
- Oldest top flight player: Stanley Matthews, aged 50 years and 5 days (for Stoke City v. Fulham, 6 February 1965)
- Youngest top flight player: Ethan Nwaneri, aged 15 years and 181 days (for Arsenal v. Brentford, 18 September 2022)
- Longest goalkeeping run without conceding a goal: 1,311 minutes, Edwin van der Sar (for Manchester United, 2008–09)

== FA Cup ==
=== Final ===
==== Team ====
- Most wins: 14, Arsenal (1930, 1936, 1950, 1971, 1979, 1993, 1998, 2002, 2003, 2005, 2014, 2015, 2017, 2020)
- Most consecutive wins: 3
  - Wanderers (1876, 1877, 1878)
  - Blackburn Rovers (1884, 1885, 1886)
- Most consecutive defeats in finals: 3, Chelsea (2020, 2021, 2022)
- Most appearances in finals: 22, Manchester United (1909, 1948, 1957, 1958, 1963, 1976, 1977, 1979, 1983, 1985, 1990, 1994, 1995, 1996, 1999, 2004, 2005, 2007, 2016, 2018, 2023, 2024)
- Most final appearances without win: 2
  - Queen's Park (1884, 1885)
  - Birmingham City (1931, 1956)
  - Watford (1984, 2019)
- Most final appearances without defeat: 5, Wanderers (1872, 1873, 1876, 1877, 1878)
- Longest winning streak in finals: 7
  - Tottenham Hotspur (1901, 1921, 1961, 1962, 1967, 1981, 1982)
  - Arsenal (2002, 2003, 2005, 2014, 2015, 2017, 2020)
- Record final win: 6–0
  - Bury 6–0 Derby County (1903)
  - Manchester City 6–0 Watford (2019)
- Most goals in a final: 7
  - Blackburn Rovers 6–1 Sheffield Wednesday (1890)
  - Blackpool 4–3 Bolton Wanderers (1953)
- Most goals in a final by a runner-up: 3
  - Bolton Wanderers (lost 3–4 against Blackpool in 1953)
  - Crystal Palace (drew 3–3 after extra time but lost replay 0–1 against Manchester United in 1990)
  - West Ham United (drew 3–3 after extra time but lost penalty shoot-out against Liverpool in 2006)
- Most defeats in finals: 9
  - Chelsea (1915, 1967, 1994, 2002, 2017, 2020, 2021, 2022, 2026)
  - Manchester United (1957, 1958, 1976, 1979, 1995, 2005, 2007, 2018, 2023)

==== Individual ====
- Most wins: 7, Ashley Cole, Arsenal (2002, 2003, 2005) and Chelsea (2007, 2009, 2010, 2012)
- Most appearances in finals: 9, Arthur Kinnaird, Wanderers (1873, 1875, 1876, 1877, 1878) and Old Etonians (1879, 1881, 1882, 1883)
- Most goals in a final: 3
  - Billy Townley (for Blackburn Rovers, 1890)
  - James Logan (for Notts County, 1894)
  - Stan Mortensen (for Blackpool, 1953)
- Most goals in finals: 5, Ian Rush, Liverpool (2 in 1986, 2 in 1989, 1 in 1992)
- Most finals scored in: 4, Didier Drogba, Chelsea (1 each in 2007, 2009, 2010, 2012)
- Youngest FA Cup finalist: Curtis Weston, aged 17 years and 119 days (for Millwall v. Manchester United, 2004)
- Youngest player to score in an FA Cup final: Norman Whiteside, aged 18 years and 19 days (for Manchester United v. Brighton & Hove Albion, 1983)
- Oldest FA Cup finalist: Billy Hampson, aged 41 years and 257 days (for Newcastle United v. Aston Villa, 1924)

=== All rounds ===
- Most goals conceded: 541, Aston Villa
- Most goals scored: 927, Kettering Town
- Highest goal difference: +380, Manchester United
- Most matches played: 488, Manchester United
- Most matches won: 275, Manchester United
- Most matches lost: 133, Notts County
- Most matches drawn: 111, Tottenham Hotspur
- Record win: Preston North End 26–0 Hyde (first round, 1887–88)
- Record away win: 14–0
  - Clapton 0–14 Nottingham Forest (first round, 1890–91)
  - Boston United 0–14 Spalding United (first qualifying round, 1964–65)
- Record away win by a non-league club against a league club: 6–1
  - Carlisle United 1–6 Wigan Athletic (first round, 1934–35)
  - Derby County 1–6 Boston United (second round, 1955–56)
- Most goals scored by a non-league club against a league club in an away win: 7, Aldershot Town (7–4 away win against Swindon Town, first round, 2023–24)
- Most clubs competing for trophy in a season: 763 (2011–12)
- Longest tie: 660 minutes (6 matches in total), Oxford City v. Alvechurch (fourth qualifying round, 1971–72; Alvechurch won the sixth match 1–0)
- Longest penalty shoot-out: 20 penalties each, Tunbridge Wells v. Littlehampton Town (preliminary round replay, 2005–06; Tunbridge Wells won 16–15)
- Most rounds played in a season: 9
  - Brighton & Hove Albion (1932–33; first–fourth qualifying rounds, first–fifth rounds)
  - New Brighton (1956–57; preliminary, first–fourth qualifying rounds, first–fourth rounds)
  - Blyth Spartans (1977–78; first–fourth qualifying rounds, first–fifth rounds)
  - Harlow Town (1979–80; preliminary, first–fourth qualifying rounds, first–fourth rounds)
- Most matches played in a season: 13, Bideford (1973–74; one first qualifying, two second qualifying, five third qualifying, four fourth qualifying, one first round)
- Most consecutive matches without defeat: 22, Blackburn Rovers (1884–1886)
- Most consecutive matches without defeat in normal time or extra time: 29, Chelsea (2009–2013)
- Most goals by a player in a single match: 9, Ted MacDougall (for Bournemouth v. Margate, 1971–72)
- Most goals without winning: 7
  - Dulwich Hamlet 8–7 St Albans City (fourth qualifying round replay, 1922–23)
  - Dulwich Hamlet 7–7 Wealdstone (fourth qualifying round, 1929–30)
- Biggest gap between two clubs in a tie: 161 difference in rank between eighth-tier Marine and Premier League Tottenham Hotspur (third round, 2020–21)
- Best run by a non-league team since 1926: Quarter-finals, Lincoln City (2016–17)
- Best run by a fourth tier club: Quarter-finals
  - Colchester United (1970–71)
  - Bradford City (1975–76)
  - Cambridge United (1989–90)
  - Grimsby Town (2022–23)
- Fastest goal: 4 seconds, Gareth Morris (for Ashton United v. Skelmersdale United, 2001–02)
- Fastest hat-trick: 2 minutes and 20 seconds, Andy Locke (for Nantwich Town v. Droylsden, 1995–96)
- Youngest player: Andy Awford, aged 15 years and 88 days (for Worcester City v. Boreham Wood, third qualifying round, 1987–88)
- Youngest goalscorer: Sean Cato, aged 16 years and 25 days (for Barrow Town v. Rothwell Town, 2011–12)
- Youngest goalscorer (proper rounds): George Williams, aged 16 years and 66 days (for Milton Keynes Dons v. Nantwich Town, 2011–12)
- Most career goals: 49, Harry Cursham, Notts County (between 1876–77 and 1887–88)
- Most goals by a player in a single FA Cup season: 18, Jimmy Ross (for Preston North End, 1887-88)

=== All-time top scorers ===
List of players with 25 or more goals As of 3 September 2026
| Rank | Player | Goals | Apps | Ratio | Years | Club(s) |
|---|---|---|---|---|---|---|
| 1 | (England) Harry Cursham | 49 | 44 | 1.11 | 1877–1888 | Notts County |
| 2 | (Wales) Ian Rush | 44 | 75 | 0.59 | 1979–1998 | Chester City, Liverpool, Newcastle United |
| 3 | (Scotland) Denis Law | 43 | 63 | 0.68 | 1956–1974 | Huddersfield Town, Manchester United, Manchester City |
| 4 | (England) Jimmy Greaves | 42 | 55 | 0.76 | 1958–1979 | Chelsea, Tottenham Hotspur, West Ham United, Barnet |
| 5 | (Scotland) Jimmy Ross | 40 | 43 | 0.93 | 1888–1902 | Preston North End, Liverpool, Burnley, Manchester City |
| 6 | (England) Steve Bloomer | 39 | 55 | 0.71 | 1893–1914 | Derby County, Middlesbrough |
| 7 | (Scotland) Archie Hunter | 36 | 42 | 0.86 | 1879–1889 | Aston Villa |
| 8 | (England) Allan Clarke | 35 | 66 | 0.53 | 1964–1980 | Walsall, Fulham, Leicester City, Leeds United, Barnsley |
| 9 | (England) George Brown | 33 | 32 | 1.03 | 1921–1935 | Huddersfield Town, Aston Villa, Burnley |
| 10 | (England) David Jack | 32 | 57 | 0.56 | 1919–1934 | Plymouth Argyle, Bolton Wanderers, Arsenal |
| 11 | (England) Stan Mortensen | 31 | 38 | 0.82 | 1956–1957 | Blackpool, Hull City |
| 12 | (England) Teddy Sheringham | 30 | 56 | 0.54 | 1986–2008 | Millwall, Nottingham Forest, Tottenham Hotspur, Manchester United, Portsmouth, West Ham United, Colchester United |
| 12 | (England) Ronnie Allen | 30 | 61 | 0.49 | 1946–1963 | Port Vale, West Bromwich Albion, Crystal Palace |
| 12 | (England) Raich Carter | 30 | 60 | 0.5 | 1931–1952 | Sunderland, Derby County, Hull City |
| 12 | (England) Tommy Browell | 30 | 38 | 0.79 | 1911–1930 | Everton, Manchester City, Blackpool |
| 12 | (England) Billy Walker | 30 | 53 | 0.57 | 1919–1933 | Aston Villa |
| 12 | (England) John Atyeo | 30 | 38 | 0.79 | 1950–1966 | Bristol City |
| 18 | (England) Jimmy Brown | 29 | 32 | 0.91 | 1881–1889 | Blackburn Rovers |
| 18 | (England) Malcolm Macdonald | 29 | 36 | 0.81 | 1969–1979 | Luton Town, Newcastle United, Arsenal |
| 18 | (England) Bobby Smith | 29 | 40 | 0.73 | 1955–1964 | Chelsea, Tottenham Hotspur |
| 18 | (England) Arthur Rowley | 29 | 52 | 0.56 | 1949–1963 | Leicester City, Shrewsbury Town |
| 22 | (England) Dixie Dean | 28 | 35 | 0.8 | 1924–1938 | Tranmere Rovers, Everton |
| 22 | (England) Frank Lampard | 28 | 73 | 0.38 | 1996–2014 | West Ham United, Chelsea, Manchester City |
| 22 | (England) Nat Lofthouse | 28 | 49 | 0.57 | 1946–1960 | Bolton Wanderers |
| 25 | (England) Adam Boyes | 27 | 37 | 0.73 | 2007- | York City, Scunthorpe United, Barrow, Guilesey, Bradford Park Avenue, Spenymoore Town, Marske United |
| 25 | (England) Alan Shearer | 27 | 58 | 0.47 | 1990–2006 | Southampton, Blackburn Rovers, Newcastle United |
| 25 | (England) John Barnes | 27 | 87 | 0.31 | 1981–1998 | Watford, Liverpool, Newcastle United |
| 25 | (England) Tony Brown | 27 | 54 | 0.5 | 1963–1981 | West Bromwich Albion |
| 25 | (England) Roy Bentley | 27 | 75 | 0.36 | 1949–1962 | Bristol City, Newcastle United, Chelsea, Fulham, Queens Park Rangers |
| 25 | (England) Jack Rowley | 27 | 44 | 0.61 | 1937–1957 | Manchester United, Plymouth Argyle |
| 25 | (England) Bobby Tambling | 27 | 37 | 0.73 | 1960–1972 | Chelsea, Crystal Palace |
| 25 | (England) David Jack | 27 | 52 | 0.52 | 1920–1934 | Bolton Wanderers, Arsenal |
| 25 | (England) Harry Hampton | 27 | 37 | 0.73 | 1904–1922 | Aston Villa, Birmingham City, Newport County |
| 33 | (England) Ronnie Rooke | 26 | 32 | 0.81 | 1931–1961 | Guildford City, Woking, Crystal Palace, Fulham, Arsenal, Bedford Town, Heywards Heath Town |
| 33 | (Wales) Mark Hughes | 26 | 72 | 0.36 | 1984–2002 | Manchester United, Chelsea, Southampton, Blackburn Rovers |
| 33 | (England) W.G. Richardson | 26 | 34 | 0.76 | 1929–1949 | West Bromwich Albion |
| 33 | (England) Cliff Bastin | 26 | 46 | 0.57 | 1929–1947 | Arsenal |
| 37 | (England) Scott McGleish | 25 | 57 | 0.45 | 1995– | Peterborough United, Barnet, Colchester United, Northampton Town, Leyton Orient, Chesham United, Wealdstone, Edgware Town, Leverstock Green |
| 37 | (England) Jack Southworth | 25 | 28 | 0.89 | 1884–1894 | Blackburn Rovers, Everton |
| 37 | (Scotland) David Herd | 25 | 53 | 0.47 | 1954–1969 | Arsenal, Manchester United, Stoke City |
| 37 | (England) Joe Smith | 25 | 46 | 0.54 | 1910–1929 | Bolton Wanderers, Stockport County |
| 37 | (Scotland) John Campbell | 25 | 35 | 0.71 | 1890–1897 | Sunderland |

== League Cup ==
=== Final ===
- Most wins (team): 10, Liverpool (1981, 1982, 1983, 1984, 1995, 2001, 2003, 2012, 2022, 2024)
- Most consecutive wins (team): 4
  - Liverpool (1981, 1982, 1983, 1984)
  - Manchester City (2018, 2019, 2020, 2021)
- Record final win: Swansea City 5–0 Bradford City (2013)
- Most goals in a final (one-off match): 5
  - Queens Park Rangers 3–2 West Bromwich Albion (1967)
  - Aston Villa 3–2 Everton (1977, second replay)
  - Nottingham Forest 3–2 Southampton (1979)
  - Luton Town 3–2 Arsenal (1988)
  - Chelsea 3–2 Liverpool (2005)
  - Swansea City 5–0 Bradford City (2013)
  - Manchester United 3–2 Southampton (2017)
- Most appearances in finals (team): 15, Liverpool (1978, 1981, 1982, 1983, 1984, 1987, 1995, 2001, 2003, 2005, 2012, 2016, 2022, 2024, 2025)
- Most wins (player): 6, Sergio Agüero and Fernandinho, Manchester City (2014, 2016, 2018, 2019, 2020, 2021)
- Most wins (manager): 5, Pep Guardiola, Manchester City (2018, 2019, 2020, 2021, 2026)
- Most defeats in finals (team): 7, Arsenal (1968, 1969, 1988, 2007, 2011, 2018, 2026)
- Most final appearances without win (team): 2
  - West Ham United (1966, 1981)
  - Everton (1977, 1984)
  - Bolton Wanderers (1995, 2004)
  - Sunderland (1985, 2014)
  - Southampton (1979, 2017)
- Lowest tier winners: Third Division (now League One)
  - Queens Park Rangers (1967)
  - Swindon Town (1969)
- Lowest tier finalists: Fourth Division (now League Two)
  - Rochdale (1962)
  - Bradford City (2013)
- Fastest goal in final: 45 seconds, John Arne Riise (for Liverpool v. Chelsea, 2005)

=== All rounds ===
- Most matches played: Liverpool, 262
- Most matches won: Liverpool, 152
- Most matches drawn: Liverpool, 56
- Most matches lost: Brentford, 81
- Record win: 10–0
  - West Ham United 10–0 Bury (second round, second leg, 25 October 1983)
  - Liverpool 10–0 Fulham (second round, first leg, 23 September 1986)
- Record aggregate win: 11 goals
  - Liverpool 13–2 Fulham (10–0 first leg, 3–2 second leg, 1986–87)
  - West Ham United 12–1 Bury (2–1 first leg, 10–0 second leg, 1983–84)
  - Liverpool 11–0 Exeter City (5–0 first leg, 6–0 second leg, 1981–82)
  - Watford 11–0 Darlington (8–0 first leg, 3–0 second leg, 1987–88)
  - Everton 11–0 Wrexham (5–0 first leg, 6–0 second leg, 1990–91)
- Most appearances (player): 102, Peter Shilton (for Leicester City, Stoke City, Nottingham Forest, Southampton, Derby County, and Plymouth Argyle)
- Most career goals: 49, Ian Rush (for Liverpool and Newcastle United, between 1980–81 and 1997–98)
- Most goals by a player in a single season: 11, Gerry Hitchens (for Aston Villa in 1960-61), Geoff Hurst (for West Ham United in 1965-66)
- Most goals by a player in a single match: 6, Frankie Bunn (for Oldham Athletic v. Scarborough, 25 October 1989)
- Most goals by a losing side: 5, Reading (5–7 defeat after extra time against Arsenal, 30 October 2012)
- Most goals without winning: 6, Dagenham & Redbridge 6–6 Brentford (Brentford won 4–2 on penalties after extra time, 11 August 2014)

=== All-time top scorers ===
List of top 10 goalscorers
| Rank | Player | Goals | Apps | Ratio | Years | Club(s) |
|---|---|---|---|---|---|---|
| 1 | (Wales) Ian Rush | 49 | 84 | 0.58 | 1980–1998 | Liverpool, Leeds United, Newcastle United, Wrexham |
| 2 | (England) Geoff Hurst | 48 | 60 | 0.82 | 1961–1975 | West Ham United, Stoke City, West Bromwich Albion |
| 3 | (Republic of Ireland) John Aldridge | 44 | 62 | 0.73 | 1978–1998 | Newport County, Oxford United, Liverpool, Tranmere Rovers |
| 4 | (England) Ian Wright | 38 | 50 | 0.76 | 1986–1999 | Crystal Palace, Arsenal, West Ham United |
| 5 | (England) Tony Cottee | 35 | 62 | 0.56 | 1982–2001 | West Ham United, Everton, Leicester City, Norwich City |
| 6 | (England) Robbie Fowler | 33 | 44 | 0.75 | 1993–2009 | Liverpool, Leeds United, Manchester City, Cardiff City, Blackburn Rovers |
| 7 | (Wales) Dean Saunders | 33 | 56 | 0.52 | 1985–2001 | Brighton & Hove Albion, Oxford United, Derby County, Liverpool, Aston Villa, Nottingham Forest, Sheffield United, Bradford City |
| 8 | (England) Alan Shearer | 32 | 50 | 0.64 | 1990–2006 | Southampton, Blackburn Rovers, Newcastle United |
| 9 | (Republic of Ireland) David Kelly | 30 | 65 | 0.46 | 1983–2002 | Walsall, West Ham United, Leicester City, Newcastle United, Tranmere Rovers, Sheffield United |
| 10 | (England) Martin Chivers | 29 | 41 | 0.71 | 1962–1976 | Southampton, Tottenham Hotspur |
| 10 | (England) Cyrille Regis | 29 | 61 | 0.48 | 1977–1996 | West Bromwich Albion, Coventry City, Aston Villa, Wycombe Wanderers, Chester City |

== FA Charity / Community Shield ==
=== Final ===
- Most wins (team): 21 (17 outright, 4 shared), Manchester United (1908, 1911, 1952, 1956, 1957, 1965, 1967, 1977, 1983, 1990, 1993, 1994, 1996, 1997, 2003, 2007, 2008, 2010, 2011, 2013, 2016)
- Most appearances (team): 31, Manchester United (1908, 1911, 1948, 1952, 1956, 1957, 1963, 1965, 1967, 1977, 1983, 1985, 1990, 1993, 1994, 1996, 1997, 1998, 1999, 2000, 2001, 2003, 2004, 2007, 2008, 2009, 2010, 2011, 2013, 2016, 2024)
- Most goals in a match: 12, Manchester United 8–4 Swindon Town (1911)
- Most wins (player): 9 (all outright wins), Ryan Giggs, Manchester United (1993, 1994, 1996, 1997, 2003, 2007, 2008, 2010, 2013)
- Most appearances (player): 15, Ryan Giggs, Manchester United (1993, 1994, 1996, 1997, 1998, 1999, 2000, 2001, 2003, 2004, 2007, 2008, 2009, 2010, 2013)
- Most defeats (player): 6, Ryan Giggs, Manchester United (1998, 1999, 2000, 2001, 2004, 2009)
- Most consecutive wins (team): 4, Everton (1984, 1985, 1986 (shared), 1987)
- Most consecutive defeats (team): 4, Manchester United (1998, 1999, 2000, 2001)
- Most consecutive appearances (team): 6, Manchester United (1996, 1997, 1998, 1999, 2000, 2001)
- Most consecutive appearances (player): 6, Ryan Giggs, Manchester United (1996, 1997, 1998, 1999, 2000, 2001)
- Most career goals: 6
  - Harold Halse, Manchester United (all in 1911)
  - Dixie Dean, Everton (2 in 1928, 4 in 1932)

== All competitions ==
- Fastest century of goals scored during a Premier League season (in fewest no. of matches played): 103 goals scored in 34 matches by Manchester City in season 2013–14. Previous record: 100 goals scored in 42 matches by Chelsea in season 2012–13 (excludes matches played / goals scored in FA Community Shield (1/2), UEFA Super Cup (1/1) and FIFA Club World Cup (2/3)).
- Fastest century of goals scored during a Premier League season (in elapsed calendar days): 103 goals scored on 18 January 2014 by Manchester City in 2013–14. Previous record: 100 goals scored on 21 February 2013 by Chelsea in season 2012–13 (excludes matches played / goals scored in FA Community Shield (1/2), UEFA Super Cup (1/1) and FIFA Club World Cup (2/3)).
- Most consecutive penalty shoot-out wins: 9 by Bradford City between 6 October 2009 and 11 December 2012
  - Football League Cup (fifth round), 11 December 2012, Bradford City beat Arsenal 3–2 on penalties (score 1–1 after extra time)
  - FA Cup (second round proper replay), 13 November 2012, Bradford City beat Northampton Town 4–2 on penalties (score 3–3 after extra time)
  - Football League Cup (fourth round), 30 October 2012, Bradford City beat Wigan Athletic 4–2 on penalties (score 0–0 after extra time)
  - Football League Trophy (second round), 9 October 2012, Bradford City beat Hartlepool United 3–2 on penalties (score 0–0 after normal time)
  - Football League Trophy (quarter-finals), 8 November 2011, Bradford City beat Sheffield United 6–5 on penalties (score 1–1 after normal time)
  - Football League Trophy (second round), 4 October 2011, Bradford City beat Huddersfield Town 4–3 on penalties (score 2–2 after normal time)
  - Football League Trophy (first round), 30 August 2011, Bradford City beat Sheffield Wednesday 3–1 on penalties (score 0–0 after normal time)
  - Football League Trophy (quarter-finals), 10 November 2009, Bradford City beat Port Vale 5–4 on penalties (score 2–2 after normal time)
  - Football League Trophy (second round), 6 October 2009, Bradford City beat Notts County 3–2 on penalties (score 2–2 after normal time)
- Fastest penalty awarded: 6 seconds. Chester v Witton Albion – 13 December 2016. Referee Joseph Johnson awarded a penalty when Blaine Hudson upended Tolani Omotola after six seconds.

== Attendance records ==
- Record attendance: 126,047, Bolton Wanderers v. West Ham United, 28 April 1923 (Wembley Stadium, FA Cup final)
- Record attendance at club ground: 121,919, Aston Villa v. Sunderland, 19 April 1913 (Crystal Palace, FA Cup final)
- Record home attendance: 85,512, Tottenham Hotspur v. Bayer Leverkusen, 2 November 2016 (Wembley Stadium, UEFA Champions League group stage)
- Record home attendance at own stadium: 84,569, Manchester City v. Stoke City, 3 March 1934 (Maine Road, FA Cup sixth round)
- Record league attendance: 83,260, Manchester United v. Arsenal, 17 January 1948 (Maine Road, First Division)
- Record Premier League attendance: 83,222, Tottenham Hotspur v. Arsenal, 10 February 2018 (Wembley Stadium)
- Record league attendance at own stadium: 82,905, Chelsea v. Arsenal, 12 October 1935 (Stamford Bridge, First Division)
- Record attendance at new Wembley: 89,874, Portsmouth v. Cardiff City, 17 May 2008 (FA Cup final)
- Record lowest attendance: 0 (COVID-19 pandemic in England)
- Record lowest attendance (not including COVID): 469, Thames v. Luton Town, 6 December 1930 (West Ham Stadium, Third Division South)

== List of English record competition winners ==
These tables list the clubs that have won honours an English record number of times. It lists all international competitions organised by UEFA and FIFA as well as competitions organised by the English governing bodies the English Football League, the Premier League, and The Football Association.

== Managers ==
- Longest-serving manager at one club: Fred Everiss, 46 years (West Bromwich Albion, 1902–1948)
- Most trophy wins: 38, Sir Alex Ferguson (Manchester United)
- Most League title wins: 13, Sir Alex Ferguson (Manchester United)
- Most FA Cup wins: 7, Arsène Wenger (Arsenal)
- Most League Cup wins: 5, Pep Guardiola (Manchester City)
- Most FA Charity / Community Shield wins: 10 (9 outright, 1 shared), Sir Alex Ferguson (Manchester United)
- Most Intercontinental Cup / FIFA Club World Cup wins: 2, Sir Alex Ferguson (Manchester United)
- Most European Cup / Champions League wins: 3, Bob Paisley (Liverpool)
- Most Inter-Cities Fairs Cup / UEFA Cup / Europa League wins: 2, Don Revie (Leeds United)
- Most top flight match wins: 625, Sir Alex Ferguson (Manchester United)
- Most European Cup / Champions League match wins: 110, Sir Alex Ferguson (Manchester United)

== See also ==
- List of football clubs in England by competitive honours won
- England national football team records and statistics
- Premier League records and statistics
