= 2003 FA Community Shield =

- The match programme cover
Arsenal	Manchester United
1	1
- Manchester United won 4–3 on penalties
- Date: 10 August 2003
- Venue: Millennium Stadium, Cardiff
- Man of the Match: Paul Scholes (Manchester United)
- Referee: Steve Bennett (Kent)
- Attendance: 59,923
- Weather: Haze; 24 °C (75 °F)

The 2003 FA Community Shield (also known as The FA Community Shield in partnership with McDonald's for sponsorship reasons) was the 81st staging of the FA Community Shield, an annual football match contested by the reigning champions of the Premier League and the holders of the FA Cup. It was held at Cardiff's Millennium Stadium on 10 August 2003. The match pitted Manchester United, champions of the 2002–03 Premier League against Shield holders Arsenal, who beat Southampton 1–0 in the 2003 FA Cup final. Manchester United won the Shield 4–3 on penalties, as neither side could be separated after a 1–1 draw in 90 minutes.

This was Manchester United's 22nd Community Shield appearance and Arsenal's 17th. Manchester United manager Sir Alex Ferguson assessed before the match that his midfield was stronger than before, despite selling first-team players David Beckham and Juan Sebastián Verón. Arsène Wenger was optimistic of Arsenal's prospects in the upcoming season despite having only made minor changes to his squad, and Chelsea's emergence as a competitor following Roman Abramovich's takeover. Having been linked with a transfer away in the summer, Arsenal captain Patrick Vieira revealed before the game his intention to stay at the club.

Goalkeepers Tim Howard and Jens Lehmann made their competitive debuts for their respective clubs in the match. Ole Gunnar Solskjær started in midfield for Manchester United and Paul Scholes played behind the main striker, Ruud van Nistelrooy. For Arsenal, Kolo Touré partnered Sol Campbell in central defence as Martin Keown was absent. Mikaël Silvestre gave Manchester United the lead in the 15th minute from a corner, but Thierry Henry equalised for Arsenal five minutes later from a free-kick. In the second half, substitute Francis Jeffers was sent off for kicking out at Phil Neville. Neither team was able to score in the remaining time, so the match was decided by a penalty shoot-out. Howard saved the decisive spot-kick taken by Robert Pires, winning United their first Shield since 1997. On the other hand, this was Arsenal's first defeat since 1993.

Both managers were pleased with their teams' performances, in particular Ferguson, who felt his players coped well in the heat. The 2003 Community Shield brought its lowest crowd since 1995; Wenger reasoned there was "less and less appetite" for the event.

== Background ==
Founded in 1908 as a successor to the Sheriff of London Charity Shield, the FA Community Shield began as a contest between the respective champions of the Football League and Southern League, although in 1913, it was played between an Amateurs XI and a Professionals XI. In 1921, it was played by the league champions of the top division and FA Cup winners for the first time. (Note: The Premier League replaced the Football League First Division at the top of the English football pyramid after its inception in 1992.) Wembley Stadium acted as the host of the Shield from 1974. Cardiff's Millennium Stadium was hosting the Shield for the third time; it took over as the venue for the event while Wembley Stadium underwent a six-year renovation between 2001 and 2006.

Manchester United qualified for the 2003 FA Community Shield by winning the Premier League – their eighth championship in 11 years. Despite making their worst start to a league campaign since the 1989–90 season, the team finished five points clear of second-placed Arsenal, the pre-season favourites. Arsenal's campaign was compensated by an appearance in the 2003 FA Cup final; the team beat Southampton 1–0 to retain the trophy and qualify for the Community Shield.

Manchester United were appearing in the Community Shield for the 22nd time, having won 10 outright (1908, 1911, 1952, 1956, 1957, 1983, 1993, 1994, 1996, 1997), sharing four (1965, 1967, 1977, 1990) and losing seven (1948, 1963, 1985, 1998, 1999, 2000, 2001). In contrast, Arsenal appeared in 16 previous Shields, likewise winning 10 outright (1930, 1931, 1933, 1934, 1938, 1948, 1953, 1998, 1999, 2002), while sharing one (1991) and losing five (1935, 1936, 1979, 1989, 1993). This was the fifth meeting between the two clubs in the Community Shield; Arsenal won three of those meetings to Manchester United's one. Manchester United's victory came in 1993 in the first drawn Charity Shield match since 1974 to be decided by penalty shoot-out.

== Pre-match ==
Manchester United manager Sir Alex Ferguson said before the Community Shield that new signings Eric Djemba-Djemba and Kléberson had made his midfield stronger, in spite of selling first-team players David Beckham and Juan Sebastián Verón: "The two of them give us youth in that department and I think it's important to have young legs in there, particularly with the number of games we play."

Arsenal captain Patrick Vieira revealed his intention to stay at the club, despite interest from Chelsea, who had been acquired by Russian billionaire Roman Abramovich in the summer. Manager Arsène Wenger used his press conference to look ahead to the new season and felt his team's chances were as good, if not better than Chelsea's: "I can understand that we look a little bit poor and out of shape but what is important is what happens on the pitch and you will see that we look good. To write us off just because we haven't spent £100 million is a bit easy."

Neither United nor Arsenal made noticeable changes to their squad, but Ferguson believed both teams would remain the ones to beat in the Premier League: "There's only really ourselves and Arsenal who know what it takes to win the Premiership. It's not an easy thing to achieve. You need experience."

== Match ==
=== Team selection ===
Goalkeeper Tim Howard started his first competitive match for Manchester United, replacing Fabien Barthez, while Quinton Fortune was selected at left-back ahead of John O'Shea. They lined up in a 4–4–1–1 formation, with forward Ole Gunnar Solskjær positioned on the right wing and Paul Scholes playing just off the main striker, Ruud van Nistelrooy. For Arsenal, Jens Lehmann made his first competitive appearance. The team lined up in a 4–4–2 formation. Kolo Touré was paired with defender Sol Campbell at centre-back in the absence of Martin Keown.

=== Summary ===
The stadium observed a minute's silence in memory of Ray Harford and Manchester United reserve player Jimmy Davis, who both died on 9 August 2003. Arsenal kicked off the match and within the first two minutes Phil Neville and Ashley Cole were booked for mistimed tackles. The match settled into "a more sedate rhythm" soon after, and in the 13th minute, Scholes' long pass found Solskjær, who was subsequently tackled; the ball ran out for a corner. It was delivered by Ryan Giggs and the ball was flicked on by Roy Keane at the near post – an unmarked Mikaël Silvestre headed it into the net, which gave United the lead. It was short-lived, however; in the 18th minute, Nicky Butt conceded a free-kick for a foul on Vieira. From "about 33 yards out", Henry shot the ball past United's wall and beat Howard in goal. Arsenal's equaliser did not hand them the impetus, for United continued to control proceedings. Silvestre's cross in the 28th minute fashioned a chance for Giggs, though Arsenal's defence prevented him from getting a shot. Giggs came close to scoring five minutes later; a cross by Butt found the Welshman whose effort hit the post. United finished the half with two half-chances.

Ray Parlour and Henry came off in the second half for Robert Pires and Sylvain Wiltord. United created an early chance, but Van Nistelrooy was unable to make the most of Giggs' delivery. The player went down in the penalty area under the challenge of Campbell, prompting United players to appeal for a penalty; however, referee Steve Bennett decided to let play continue. Arsenal countered twice thereafter, but their attacks broke down on both counts. Vieira, Scholes and Quinton Fortune were booked for tackles during a 10-minute spell. Both clubs made substitutions in the midway point of the second half: for Arsenal, Bergkamp, Gilberto and Ljungberg were replaced by Francis Jeffers, Edu and Giovanni van Bronckhorst, whereas for United, Butt and Fortune came off for Eric Djemba-Djemba and John O'Shea. In the 72nd minute, Jeffers was shown a red card for kicking out at Neville. Ferguson brought on striker Diego Forlán for Neville six minutes later. Djemba-Djemba avoided a yellow card for his challenge on Campbell in the 80th minute; Bennett deemed it unintentional.

The game descended into a scrappy affair in the last few minutes, with few clear cut chances for either side. With no further goals, it was decided by penalties. Scholes, Edu and Ferdinand converted their kicks, before Howard saved Van Bronkhorst's effort. Van Nistelrooy missed his and Wiltord scored to level the tally at 2–2 in the shoot-out. Solskjær, Lauren and Forlán scored, but Pires missed – his effort saved by Howard – which won United the Shield, 4–3 on penalties.

=== Details ===
10 August 2003
14:00 BST

Arsenal	1–1	Manchester United
Henry 20'	Report	Silvestre 15'
Penalties
Edu (penalty scored); Van Bronckhorst (penalty missed); Wiltord (penalty scored); Lauren (penalty scored); Pires (penalty missed)	3–4	(penalty scored) Scholes; (penalty scored) Ferdinand; (penalty missed) Van Nistelrooy; (penalty scored) Solskjær; (penalty scored) Forlán

Millennium Stadium, Cardiff
Attendance: 59,923
Referee: Steve Bennett (Kent)

Arsenal	Manchester United

GK	1	(Germany) Jens Lehmann
RB	12	(Cameroon) Lauren
CB	28	(Ivory Coast) Kolo Touré
CB	23	(England) Sol Campbell
LB	3	(England) Ashley Cole	(yellow card) 2'
RM	15	(England) Ray Parlour		(substituted off) 45'
CM	4	(France) Patrick Vieira (c)	(yellow card) 52'
CM	19	(Brazil) Gilberto Silva		(substituted off) 60'
LM	8	(Sweden) Freddie Ljungberg		(substituted off) 65'
SS	10	(Netherlands) Dennis Bergkamp		(substituted off) 60'
CF	14	(France) Thierry Henry		(substituted off) 45'
Substitutes:
GK	13	(England) Stuart Taylor
DF	18	(France) Pascal Cygan
MF	7	(France) Robert Pires		(substituted on) 45'
MF	16	(Netherlands) Giovanni van Bronckhorst		(substituted on) 65'
MF	17	(Brazil) Edu		(substituted on) 60'
FW	9	(England) Francis Jeffers	(red card) 72'	(substituted on) 60'
FW	11	(France) Sylvain Wiltord		(substituted on) 45'
Manager:
(France) Arsène Wenger

GK	14	(United States) Tim Howard
RB	3	(England) Phil Neville	(yellow card) 1'	(substituted off) 78'
CB	5	(England) Rio Ferdinand
CB	27	(France) Mikaël Silvestre
LB	25	(South Africa) Quinton Fortune	(yellow card) 59'	(substituted off) 69'
RM	20	(Norway) Ole Gunnar Solskjær
CM	16	(Republic of Ireland) Roy Keane (c)
CM	8	(England) Nicky Butt		(substituted off) 61'
LM	11	(Wales) Ryan Giggs
SS	18	(England) Paul Scholes	(yellow card) 53'
CF	10	(Netherlands) Ruud van Nistelrooy
Substitutes:
GK	13	(Northern Ireland) Roy Carroll
DF	22	(Republic of Ireland) John O'Shea		(substituted on) 69'
MF	19	(Cameroon) Eric Djemba-Djemba		(substituted on) 61'
MF	23	(England) Kieran Richardson
MF	24	(Scotland) Darren Fletcher
FW	12	(France) David Bellion
FW	21	(Uruguay) Diego Forlán		(substituted on) 78'
Manager:
(Scotland) Sir Alex Ferguson

Match officials

- Assistant referees:
  - Andy Woolmer (Northamptonshire)
  - Glenn Turner (Derbyshire)
- Fourth official: Phil Dowd (Staffordshire)

Match rules

- 90 minutes
- Penalty shoot-out if scores level after 90 minutes
- Seven named substitutes, of which up to six may be used

=== Statistics ===
Statistic	Arsenal	Manchester United
Goals scored	1	1
Possession	50%	50%
Shots on target	2	2
Shots off target	3	6
Blocked shots	4	3
Corner kicks	4	2
Fouls	12	14
Offsides	3	2
Yellow cards	2	3
Red cards	1	0

== Post-match ==
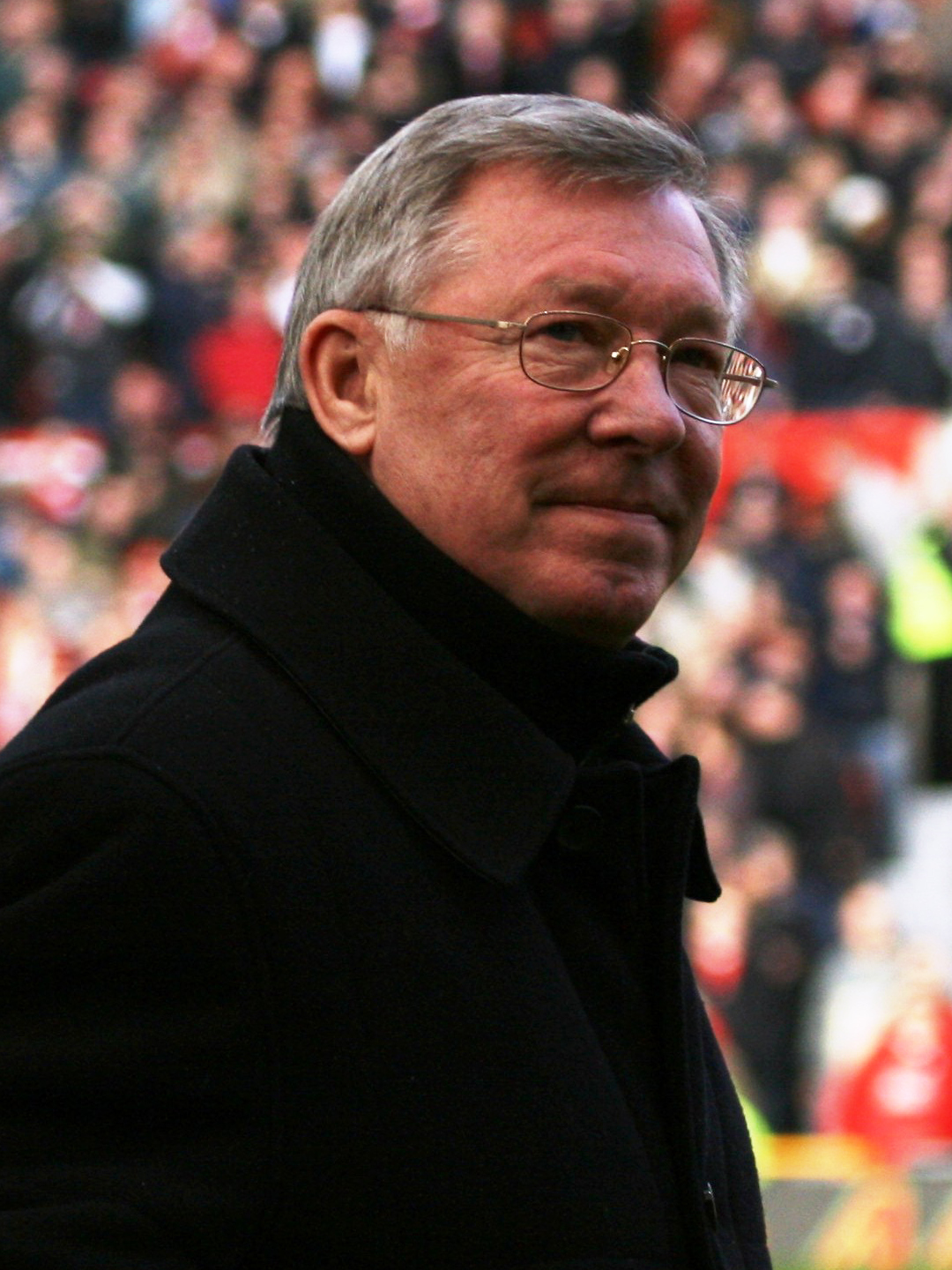
Sir Alex Ferguson was delighted with his team's performance.

Henry Winter of The Daily Telegraph opined that, injuries to players aside, "The Community Shield itself experienced most damage". Arsenal returned 8,000 of their ticket allocation, while transport problems meant spectators were unable to reach Cardiff in time. A crowd of 59,923 was the Shield's lowest in eight years.

Ferguson was delighted in how his team coped with the pitchside temperatures: "You had to be down there to appreciate it. I was told it was 41 degrees on the pitch – I know I was roasting just watching them." When asked about Howard's positioning for Arsenal's equaliser, he replied: "Tim wanted three in the wall and he will learn from that. This isn't America." Silvestre denied suggestions that the win gave United a psychological edge over Arsenal: "This is still a pre-season game. We won the Premiership title with a strong run at the end of last season." Howard was unsure whether he would displace Barthez in the first team for a prolonged run – "that's not my decision", though continued "We have four great goalkeepers and we're looking to have a good battle all season long."

Wenger was content with his team's performance: "We are at only 80% fitness and still we got a draw with Manchester United," and thought his defence stood firm against United's attack. He felt Jeffers' dismissal was "deserved" for overreacting, but added, "He's apologised. He realised he made a mistake. He's intelligent, he's young and he'll learn." The performance of Lehmann encouraged the Arsenal manager; he noted that the goalkeeper was "amazed to see the referee wave play on after one aerial challenge." Wenger made reference to Arsenal's low crowd turnout and suggested it meant there was "less and less appetite" for the Shield.

== See also ==
- 2003–04 FA Premier League
- 2003–04 FA Cup
- Arsenal F.C.–Manchester United F.C. rivalry
