= 2000 FA Charity Shield =

- The match took place at Wembley Stadium
Chelsea	Manchester United
2	0
- Date: 13 August 2000
- Venue: Wembley Stadium, London
- Man of the Match: Jimmy Floyd Hasselbaink
- Referee: Mike Riley (West Yorkshire)
- Attendance: 65,148

The 2000 FA Charity Shield (also known as The One 2 One FA Charity Shield for sponsorship reasons) was the 78th FA Charity Shield, an annual football match organised by the Football Association, and contested by the winners of the previous season's Premier League and FA Cup competitions. It was the final club match played at the original Wembley Stadium in London and took place on 13 August 2000 between Chelsea, the winners of the 1999–2000 FA Cup, and Manchester United, who had won the 1999–2000 FA Premier League. Watched by a crowd of 65,148, Chelsea won the match 2–0.

This was Chelsea's 4th appearance in the Shield and Manchester United's 20th. It was the second time they had met in the competition. Chelsea were without Albert Ferrer, who had sustained a chest injury in pre-season, while Graeme Le Saux made his first appearance in 10 months after recovering from an ankle injury. Three of Chelsea's new signings made their debuts for the team, with Jimmy Floyd Hasselbaink, Eiður Guðjohnsen and Mario Stanić named in the squad, while goalkeeper Fabien Barthez was Manchester United's only debutant.

Chelsea took the lead in the 22nd minute when Hasselbaink's shot deflected off Jaap Stam and over Barthez after the Dutch striker was put through on goal by a Gus Poyet header. Manchester United captain Roy Keane was shown a red card midway through the second half for a tackle on Poyet. Minutes later, Chelsea scored a second goal through Mario Melchiot, who shot left-footed low past the legs of Stam and Barthez. No further goals were scored and Chelsea took the Charity Shield for the second time, 45 years after their first in 1955. It was the third year in succession that Manchester United had been defeated in the competition, the first club to suffer the feat.

== Background ==
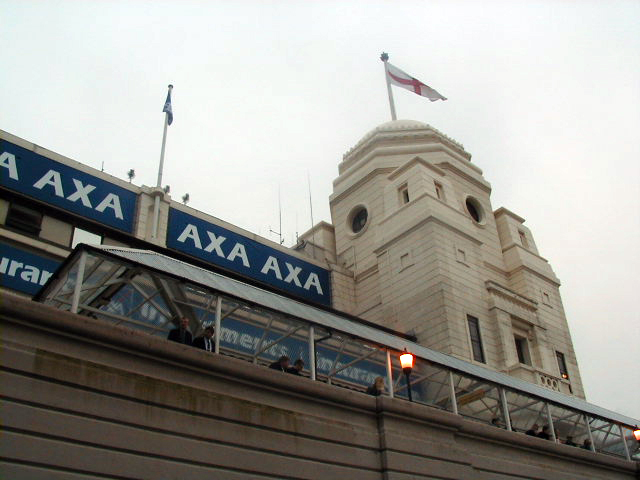
Wembley Stadium played host to the Charity Shield for the 27th and final time.

Founded in 1908 as a successor to the Sheriff of London Charity Shield, the FA Charity Shield began as a contest between the respective champions of the Football League and the Southern League, although in 1913 it was played between an Amateurs XI and a Professionals XI. In 1921, it was played by the First Division champions and FA Cup winners for the first time. (Note: The Premier League replaced the Football League First Division at the top of the English football pyramid after its inception in 1992.) The match in 2000 was the 27th and last Charity Shield to be played at the original Wembley Stadium before it was demolished for renovation. The host broadcaster was Sky Sports, who provided main commentary from Martin Tyler and Andy Gray, as well as an alternative feed dubbed "FanZone" via the interactive Sky Digital platform, with a fan from each team providing commentary.

Chelsea qualified by way of winning the 1999–2000 FA Cup, their second FA Cup title in the previous four years. They defeated Aston Villa 1–0 in the final. Manchester United had qualified for the Charity Shield by winning the 1999–2000 FA Premier League, their sixth league championship in eight years. They had scored a league-high 97 goals and won the title by a then-record margin of 18 points over second-placed Arsenal. Chelsea were appearing in the Charity Shield for a fourth time; they had won in their first appearance in 1955, and lost in 1970 and 1997. This was Manchester United's 20th appearance in the competition; they had won ten (1908, 1911, 1952, 1956, 1957, 1983, 1993, 1994, 1996, 1997), shared four (1965, 1967, 1977, 1990) and lost five (1948, 1963, 1985, 1998 and 1999). By their fifth consecutive appearance, United surpassed the record of four they shared with Arsenal and Everton, who respectively achieved that feat between 1933 and 1936, and 1984 and 1987. The 2000 match was the second meeting between these two clubs in the Shield; Manchester United won the previous encounter in 1997 4–2 in a penalty shoot-out after a 1–1 draw in normal time.

== Pre-match ==
Manchester United manager Alex Ferguson said before the match that he was pleased that his side was one of the teams to play in the final Charity Shield match to be contested at the old Wembley Stadium and was hoping the win could give the team a good start stating: "The Charity Shield is not the most important fixture, but nonetheless it is preparation – and in preparation you want to do well. We want to see some progress from the games that we've had so far and the training." Gianluca Vialli, the Chelsea manager, used his press conference to emphasise that new signings Jimmy Floyd Hasselbaink and Eiður Guðjohnsen would score additional goals for the club and spoke of the Charity Shield's significance, saying: "It is a very important match for us as we can win a trophy and put it in our cabinet. That would be the best way to start a new season – beating the champions at Wembley and winning a trophy."

Phil Neville, a defender for Manchester United, was told by Ferguson to expect verbal abuse from the spectators during the match because he was blamed for bringing about England's exit from UEFA Euro 2000 after a 3–2 defeat to Romania two months prior. He had already received abuse in a pre-season friendly match against Shrewsbury Town of which Ferguson said: "When you play away from home, you're hardly going to get bouquets of flowers thrown at you. That's not going to change, but I think Phil is capable of handling it. I expect his team-mates to help him through it. That's what teams are about. That's what the word 'team' means."

Paul Johnson of Racing Post opined that Chelsea would be the team more likely to win the Charity Shield even though the two clubs had each won 8 of their last 16 encounters. The football correspondent of the Sydney-based Daily Telegraph wrote that other clubs will focus on Manchester United's weaknesses rather than the final score of the match. Mike Riley was selected as the referee for the match; Uriah Rennie was originally slated to take charge of the match before it was discovered that he had been demoted from the list of Premier League referees, and he ultimately served as fourth official. Neither club sold out their allocation of tickets, with Chelsea selling 27,000 out of 30,000 reserved.

== Match ==
=== Team selection ===
Both teams lined up in a 4–4–2 formation. David Beckham was passed fit by Ferguson to play for Manchester United after the midfielder was treated for a back injury he sustained in training. Wes Brown and David May were absent with a cruciate ligament and Achilles tendon injury respectively, and Jesper Blomqvist had not recovered from injury to return to first-team action. This was Fabien Barthez's first match.

Chelsea were without Spanish full-back Albert Ferrer, who sustained a chest injury during the team's pre-season tour of the Netherlands that required him to rest for 10 days. Emerson Thome and John Terry also missed the game through hamstring and ankle injuries respectively. Graeme Le Saux began as a substitute in his first competitive match for 10 months after being sidelined with an ankle injury that needed two minor operations. Vialli included his team's new signings Guðjohnsen, Hasselbaink and Mario Stanić in Chelsea's matchday squad.

=== Summary ===
The match kicked off at 15:00 local time under cloudy skies and in front of 65,148 spectators. Manchester United had the first chance after seven minutes, when Teddy Sheringham was fouled by Frank Leboeuf and the resulting free-kick taken by Beckham went straight into the Chelsea wall. A minute later, Hasselbaink set up his teammate Stanić, whose shot from 12 yd (11 m) went wide to the left of the Manchester United goal post. The first sign of tension between the players came after 15 minutes when Roy Keane and Gus Poyet clattered into each other during a 50–50 tackle. The referee did not take any action. Gianfranco Zola beat Gary Neville on the left wing and put in a cross, only for Stanić to head wide from the back post. Hasselbaink then took possession when he forced Mikaël Silvestre to rush his shot which then went wide of the goal. Ferguson made a substitution in the 19th minute bringing on Jaap Stam for Silvestre, who had suffered a hip injury.

Two minutes later, Ryan Giggs set up Ole Gunnar Solskjær who struck Manchester United's first chance to score into the side netting. Hasselbaink opened the scoring for Chelsea in the 22nd minute by curling the ball over goalkeeper Barthez's head and past him via a deflection off Stam after being put through by a header from Poyet 40 yd (37 m) away. A tackle from Mario Melchiot stopped Sheringham, and Zola took advantage of the confused Manchester United defence between Barthez and Denis Irwin on the six-yard line. The best opportunity for Manchester United came before the first half ended when Beckham's angled pass came into Paul Scholes's path in the penalty box. Scholes received the ball with his chest and shot at goal as it came down onto his foot, but his shot went to the right of De Goey and away from goal due to pressure from Leboeuf.

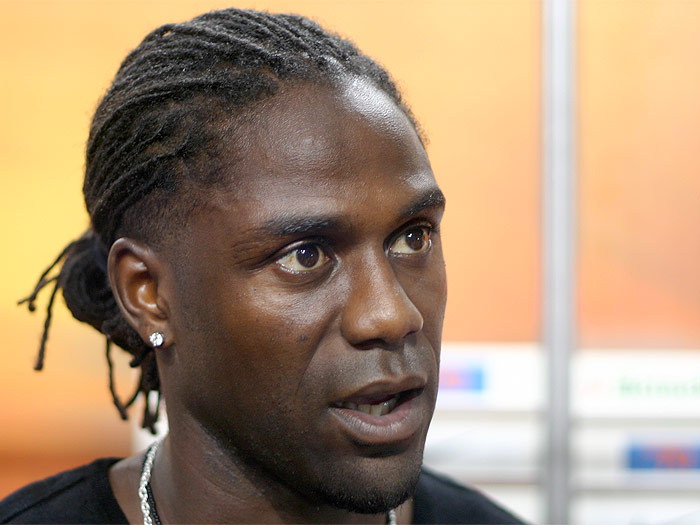
Mario Melchiot scored Chelsea's second goal of the match after 72 minutes.

The second half began with a volley from Scholes deflecting onto the Chelsea crossbar, leading to a corner kick. Barthez dived to the left to save a shot from Leboeuf and took possession of the ball. In the 59th minute, a tackle on Keane by Hasselbaink prompted Keane to waggle his finger in Hasselbaink's face in anger. Beckham and referee Mike Riley suggested to Keane that he maintain his composure, which he remonstrated against. Two minutes later, Keane received a red card from Riley for a studs-up tackle on Poyet's calf muscle from behind. It was Keane's seventh red card in seven seasons at Manchester United, and resulted in a three-match ban. Ferguson did not immediately re-organise his side and left three players in the midfield. He made Manchester United's second change in the 70th minute, when he brought on Dwight Yorke and Andy Cole for Sheringham and Solskjær to try and draw 1–1. Meanwhile, Chelsea brought on Jody Morris for Roberto Di Matteo.

In the 72nd minute, Chelsea extended their lead to 2–0 when Melchiot dribbled down the right to the edge of the penalty box and knocked the ball low with his left foot between Stam's legs and past Barthez into the far post from 18 yd (16 m). Le Saux came on for Poyet in the 77th minute and immediately set up Hasselbaink, whose header went wide of the post. Quinton Fortune replaced Giggs a minute later. Scholes received a yellow card for a tackle on Morris after 81 minutes, and then had a shot which went over the Chelsea goal. The remaining six minutes of the match passed without further incident, and Chelsea won 2–0. It was the second time Chelsea had won the Charity Shield, while Manchester United had lost in the Charity Shield for the third year in a row after defeats to Arsenal in 1998 and 1999.

=== Details ===
13 August 2000
15:00 BST

Chelsea	2–0	Manchester United
Hasselbaink 22'; Melchiot 73'	(Report) (Teams)

Wembley Stadium
Attendance: 65,148
Referee: Mike Riley (West Yorkshire)

Chelsea	Manchester United

GK	1	(Netherlands) Ed de Goey
RB	15	(Netherlands) Mario Melchiot
CB	5	(France) Frank Leboeuf
CB	6	(France) Marcel Desailly
LB	3	(Nigeria) Celestine Babayaro
RM	12	(Croatia) Mario Stanić
CM	16	(Italy) Roberto Di Matteo	(substituted off) 70'
CM	11	(England) Dennis Wise (c)
LM	8	(Uruguay) Gus Poyet	(substituted off) 77'
SS	25	(Italy) Gianfranco Zola	(substituted off) 73'
CF	9	(Netherlands) Jimmy Floyd Hasselbaink
Substitutes:
GK	23	(Italy) Carlo Cudicini
DF	14	(England) Graeme Le Saux	(substituted on) 77'
DF	21	(France) Bernard Lambourde
MF	18	(Italy) Gabriele Ambrosetti
MF	20	(England) Jody Morris	(substituted on) 70'
FW	19	(Norway) Tore André Flo
FW	22	(Iceland) Eiður Guðjohnsen	(substituted on) 73'
Manager:
(Italy) Gianluca Vialli

GK	1	(France) Fabien Barthez
RB	2	(England) Gary Neville
CB	5	(Norway) Ronny Johnsen
CB	27	(France) Mikaël Silvestre		(substituted off) 19'
LB	3	(Republic of Ireland) Denis Irwin
RM	7	(England) David Beckham
CM	16	(Republic of Ireland) Roy Keane (c)	(red card) 62'
CM	18	(England) Paul Scholes	(yellow card) 81'
LM	11	(Wales) Ryan Giggs		(substituted off) 78'
CF	20	(Norway) Ole Gunnar Solskjær		(substituted off) 70'
CF	10	(England) Teddy Sheringham		(substituted off) 70'
Substitutes:
GK	17	(Netherlands) Raimond van der Gouw
DF	6	(Netherlands) Jaap Stam		(substituted on) 19'
DF	12	(England) Phil Neville
MF	8	(England) Nicky Butt
MF	25	(South Africa) Quinton Fortune		(substituted on) 78'
FW	9	(England) Andy Cole		(substituted on) 70'
FW	19	(Trinidad and Tobago) Dwight Yorke		(substituted on) 70'
Manager:
(Scotland) Sir Alex Ferguson

Match rules

- 90 minutes
- Penalty shoot-out if scores level
- Seven named substitutes
- Maximum of six substitutions

Man of the match

- Gianfranco Zola (Chelsea)

== Post-match ==
During the presentation of medals in the Royal Box, Chelsea chairman Ken Bates attempted to hang a blue and white joke medal inscribed with the words Lord Fergie, the best thing since sliced bread around the neck of Ferguson as a peace offering, after the latter had likened the former to Mao Zedong in his autobiography. Ferguson refused the medal and Bates said: "I wanted to try to calm things down but he wouldn't take it and that says more about him than me."

Vialli said he was delighted with the result and praised the form of his players: "It was a real match. The players performed in a very convincing way." He praised his players and stated he did not wish to be overexcited: "I'm sure the Manchester United players will feel this defeat and will be spot on for the first league game. We have to be the same against West Ham otherwise this victory won't count for anything. If we get carried away I am sure West Ham will make it very difficult for us." Ferguson commented on his team: "It was a game we were looking to help produce the sharpness we usually have. We played pretty football but without a cutting edge." Sheringham believed that Chelsea were deserved winners, saying: "In that sense it was a good run-out and as long as we're right for then, we will be very happy. That's what it's all geared to."

Ferguson argued that Riley had created the incident that saw Keane sent off for his tackle on Poyet: "The referee waited too long to act. There were a lot of players going in hard right throughout the game. You have to be fair to both camps and we were just waiting to see how long he (Riley) was going to leave it. It is a showpiece occasion but if someone commits a yellow card offence, the appropriate action should be taken." Hasselbaink apologised to Keane and said he had made an error in the earlier tackle. The Referees' Association president Peter Willis expressed concern that the Premier League will become "a bloodbath" if there was continued scrutiny of "officials' performances": "All of us accept that football is an emotional game, we can make errors of judgement in challenges but there was no misinterpretation of what happened yesterday and I don't think Sir Alex Ferguson can argue against that."

Manchester United retained the Premier League during the 2000–01 season, which they won by ten points from second-placed Arsenal. Chelsea struggled in the league, losing eleven games as they finished in sixth, nineteen points behind United.

== See also ==
- 2000–01 Chelsea F.C. season
- 2000–01 Manchester United F.C. season

== Sources ==
- 2000 Final at independent.co.uk
