= 2001 FA Charity Shield =

- The match programme cover
Liverpool	Manchester United
2	1
- Date: 12 August 2001
- Venue: Millennium Stadium, Cardiff
- Man of the Match: Sander Westerveld (Liverpool)
- Referee: Andy D'Urso (Essex)
- Attendance: 70,227

The 2001 FA Charity Shield (also known as The One 2 One FA Charity Shield for sponsorship reasons) was the 79th FA Charity Shield, an annual football match played between the winners of the previous season's Premier League and FA Cup. The match was contested between Liverpool, winners of the 2000–01 FA Cup and Manchester United, who won the 2000–01 Premier League on 12 August 2001. It was the first Shield match to be held at the Millennium Stadium following the closure of Wembley Stadium for reconstruction. It was also the final time that the match was played under the FA Charity Shield name, as it was renamed as the FA Community Shield the following year.

This was Liverpool's 19th appearance and Manchester United's 21st and the 5th time they had met in the competition. The anticipated meeting of Liverpool midfielder Steven Gerrard and new Manchester United signing Juan Sebastián Verón did not occur. Another omission from the Liverpool team was striker Robbie Fowler, who was left out of the matchday squad. New signings for both teams made an appearance, with defender John Arne Riise making his first appearance in English football for Liverpool, while striker Ruud van Nistelrooy made his debut for Manchester United.

Watched by a crowd of 70,027 spectators, Liverpool took the lead in the second minute when Gary McAllister scored from a penalty awarded for a foul by Roy Keane on Danny Murphy. Liverpool extended their lead in the 16th minute when striker Michael Owen scored. Manchester United scored in the second half through Van Nistelrooy but were unable to find the equalising goal in the remaining minutes. Thus, Liverpool won the match 2–1 to win the Shield for the 14th time. Despite the victory, Liverpool manager Gérard Houllier was realistic about his team's prospects in the upcoming 2001–02 FA Premier League. Manchester United manager Alex Ferguson was critical of referee Andy D'Urso's performance after he turned down two penalty appeals from his side during the match. Liverpool's victory marked their 14th success, while United became the first club to lost four consecutive Charity/Community Shield.

== Background ==
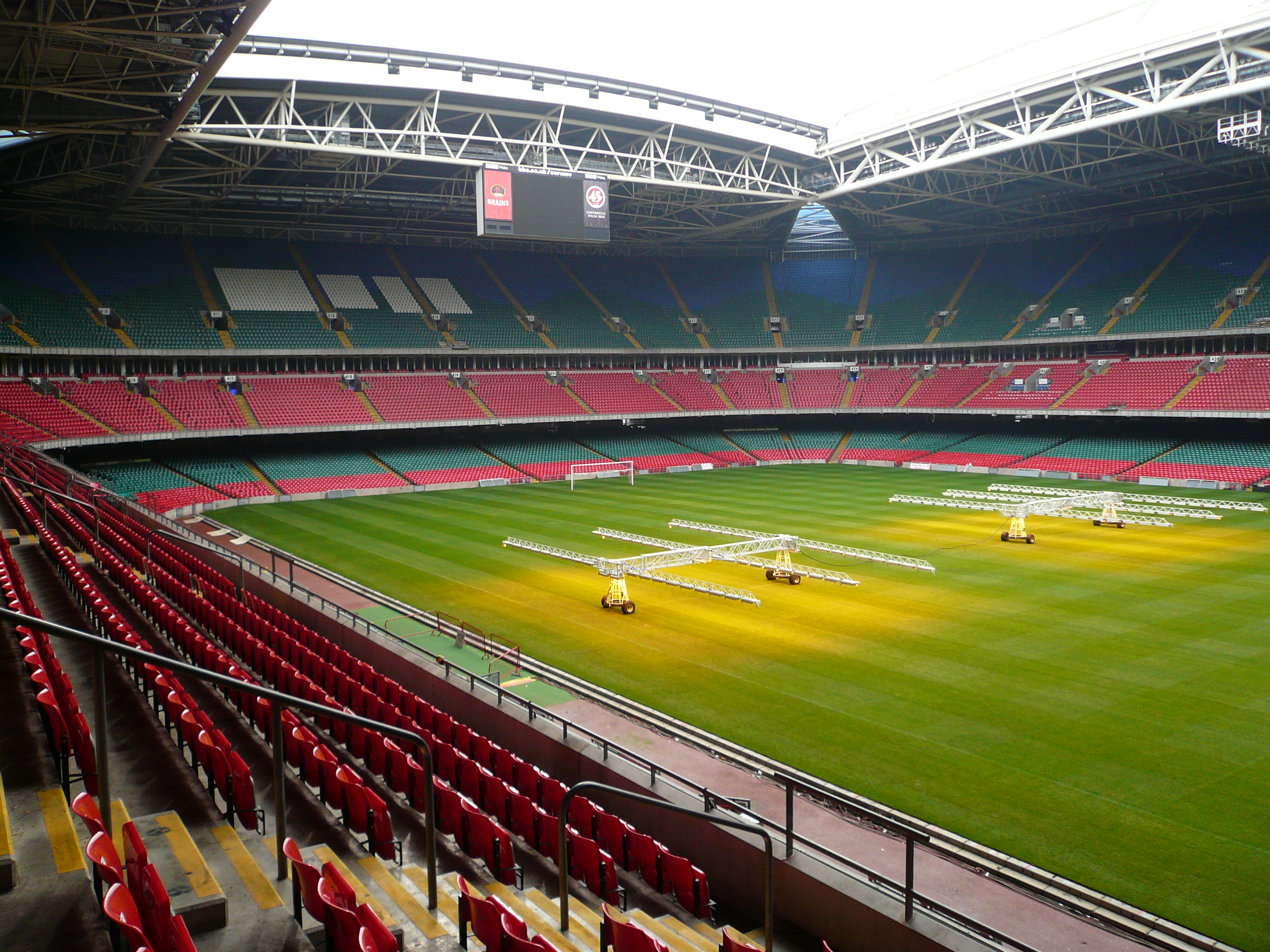
The Millennium Stadium, which was hosting the Shield for the first time.

Founded in 1908 as a successor to the Sheriff of London Charity Shield, the FA Community Shield began as a contest between the respective champions of the Football League and Southern League, although in 1913 it was played between an Amateurs XI and a Professionals XI. In 1921, it was played by the league champions of the top division and FA Cup winners for the first time. (Note: The Premier League replaced the Football League First Division at the top of the English football pyramid after its inception in 1992.) Wembley Stadium acted as the host of the Shield from 1974. Cardiff's Millennium Stadium was hosting the Shield for the first time; it took over as the venue for the event while the new Wembley Stadium underwent a six-year renovation between 2001 and 2006.

Liverpool qualified for the Charity Shield by winning the 2000–01 FA Cup. They beat Arsenal 2–1 in the final, courtesy of two goals from Michael Owen after Freddie Ljungberg had given Arsenal the lead. Manchester United qualified by way of winning the 2000–01 FA Premier League, their third successive league championship. They finished 10 points clear of second placed Arsenal.

Liverpool were appearing in their 19th match in the competition. They had won seven outright (1966, 1976, 1979, 1980, 1982, 1988, 1989), shared five (1964, 1965, 1974, 1977, 1986, 1990) and lost five (1922, 1971, 1983, 1984, 1992). This was Manchester United's 21st and sixth consecutive appearance in the competition, they had won 10 (1908, 1911, 1952, 1956, 1957, 1983, 1993, 1994, 1996, 1997), shared four (1965, 1967, 1977, 1990) and lost six (1948, 1963, 1985, 1998, 1999, 2000). Liverpool and United had previously contested the Shield four times, with United winning in 1983 and the Shield being shared on the other three occasions in 1965, 1977 and 1990.

Before the match, the decision was taken to close the roof on the Millennium Stadium, the first time this had happened in the United Kingdom. Liverpool lined up in a 4–4–2 formation, with new signing John Arne Riise included in the team, while midfielder Steven Gerrard was absent with an ankle injury. There was also no place for striker Robbie Fowler, who was expected to captain the side. Manchester United lined up in a 4–4–1–1 formation, with Paul Scholes playing just off the main striker, Ruud van Nistelrooy, who made his debut for the club. Van Nistelrooy's fellow new signing, Juan Sebastián Verón, was on international duty with the Argentina national team; his place in midfield was taken by Nicky Butt.

== Match ==
=== First half ===
Manchester United kicked off the match, but within the first two minutes they had conceded a goal. A foul on Liverpool midfielder Danny Murphy by United captain Roy Keane resulted in a Liverpool penalty, which Gary McAllister subsequently scored to give Liverpool a 1–0 lead. Minutes later, Liverpool were awarded a free kick, but McAllister was unable to score, hitting Manchester United's defensive wall. United had their first chance two minutes later, but Van Nistelrooy miscued his shot in front of goal. In the 11th minute, Liverpool's lead was almost extended as United midfielder Nicky Butt almost diverted a cross from Riise into his own goal. Five minutes later, Liverpool did extend their lead; United defender Jaap Stam slipped after Liverpool striker Emile Heskey headed the ball down to Michael Owen, allowing Owen to sidestep Gary Neville and place his shot into the United goal to make the score 2–0. The frustration of the United players was beginning to show and immediately after the goal, Paul Scholes was shown a yellow card for a challenge on Dietmar Hamann.

United's best chance of the half so far came in the 25th minute. Keane met a free kick from David Beckham with a header, which was saved by Liverpool goalkeeper Sander Westerveld. Three minutes later, United felt they should have had a penalty when Mikaël Silvestre's shot hit the arm of Liverpool defender Stéphane Henchoz, but referee Andy D'Urso did not award a penalty. Liverpool continued to be dangerous on the attack and came close to extending their lead in the 34th minute; United goalkeeper Fabien Barthez failed to claim a cross from McAllister and the ball fell to Nick Barmby, but his shot was cleared off the line by Denis Irwin. United came closest to scoring in the 36th minute, but Keane's shot from 25 yards (23 m) hit the crossbar with Westerveld beaten. United continued to enjoy the majority of the possession, but were unable to make it count as they could not find a way past Liverpool's defence.

=== Second half ===
Manchester United started the second half in attacking fashion, as they had chances immediately. A Silvestre run down the pitch resulted in a pass that found Van Nistelrooy on the edge of the Liverpool penalty area, but his shot went high and wide of the goal. He had another chance a minute later, but despite beating the offside trap set by the Liverpool defence, he could not beat Westerveld, who saved his shot. United's attacking start to the half was underlined by a third chance in as many minutes, but Scholes' shot went wide of the Liverpool goal. However, two minutes later, United's pressure told and they scored. A move that involved Beckham, Keane and Ryan Giggs resulted in the ball being played to Van Nistelrooy, who went around Westerveld and subsequently scored to reduce Liverpool's lead to 2–1. Beckham came close to levelling the match in the 62nd minute when he had two chances to score; he was unable to get his shot on target after Liverpool failed to clear a cross from Giggs and he was unable to score with a long-range shot.

In an effort to find the equalising goal, United manager Alex Ferguson moved Giggs from the centre of midfield to the left in order to restore the width of his team and brought on striker Dwight Yorke for Butt. Yorke would spearhead the attack with Van Nistelrooy, a partnership that worked on the club's pre-season tour of Asia. United had another chance in the 68th minute, but Scholes was unable to beat Westerveld, who saved his shot. Liverpool manager Gérard Houllier made his first substitutions of the match soon after; in an attempt to regain control of possession, he brought on Igor Bišćan and Patrik Berger to replace Barmby and Murphy. Liverpool's first chance of the half came in the 81st minute, Bišćan and Owen exchanged passes, before Bišćan shot wide of the goal. United went straight on the attack and a goal-bound shot by Keane was saved by Westerveld. Liverpool replaced Riise with defender Jamie Carragher minutes later in order to see out the game. A minute later, referee D'Urso declined to award United a penalty for the second time when Van Nistelrooy's shot appeared to be blocked by the arm of Henchoz. United continued to push forward for an equaliser, but a long-range shot by Irwin, which went wide, was their only notable chance before the match ended. Liverpool won 2–1 to win the Shield for the 14th time.

=== Details ===
12 August 2001
14:00

Liverpool	2–1	Manchester United
McAllister 2' (pen.); Owen 16'	Report	Van Nistelrooy 51'

Millennium Stadium, Cardiff
Attendance: 70,227
Referee: Andy D'Urso (Essex)

Liverpool	Manchester United

GK	1	(Netherlands) Sander Westerveld
RB	6	(Germany) Markus Babbel
CB	4	(Finland) Sami Hyypiä (c)
CB	2	(Switzerland) Stéphane Henchoz
LB	18	(Norway) John Arne Riise		(substituted off) 84'
RM	20	(England) Nick Barmby		(substituted off) 72'
CM	16	(Germany) Dietmar Hamann
CM	21	(Scotland) Gary McAllister
LM	13	(England) Danny Murphy	(yellow card) 35'	(substituted off) 72'
CF	8	(England) Emile Heskey
CF	10	(England) Michael Owen
Substitutes:
GK	19	(France) Pegguy Arphexad
DF	23	(England) Jamie Carragher		(substituted on) 84'
DF	30	(Mali) Djimi Traoré
MF	25	(Croatia) Igor Bišćan		(substituted on) 72'
MF	11	(England) Jamie Redknapp
MF	15	(Czech Republic) Patrik Berger		(substituted on) 72'
FW	37	(Finland) Jari Litmanen
Manager:
(France) Gérard Houllier

GK	1	(France) Fabien Barthez
RB	3	(Republic of Ireland) Denis Irwin
CB	2	(England) Gary Neville
CB	6	(Netherlands) Jaap Stam
LB	27	(France) Mikaël Silvestre
RM	7	(England) David Beckham
CM	8	(England) Nicky Butt		(substituted off) 66'
CM	16	(Republic of Ireland) Roy Keane (c)
LM	11	(Wales) Ryan Giggs
CF	18	(England) Paul Scholes	(yellow card) 17'
CF	10	(Netherlands) Ruud van Nistelrooy
Substitutes:
GK	13	(Northern Ireland) Roy Carroll
DF	5	(Norway) Ronny Johnsen
DF	12	(England) Phil Neville
DF	24	(England) Wes Brown
MF	15	(England) Luke Chadwick
FW	19	(Trinidad and Tobago) Dwight Yorke		(substituted on) 66'
FW	20	(Norway) Ole Gunnar Solskjær
Manager:
(Scotland) Sir Alex Ferguson

Man of the match

- Sander Westerveld (Liverpool)

== Post-match ==
The win marked Liverpool's third consecutive victory against Manchester United, but despite this, manager Houllier refused to get carried away: "At the moment I am worried because the team which has won the Charity Shield in recent years has not won the title, I don't think you can draw conclusions from this match." Man of the match Sander Westerveld echoed similar sentiments: "It doesn't say too much about the season. Last year Chelsea beat them 2-0 and had high expectations. We played well and it's a good result but it doesn't say anything about the Championship." Questions were asked about the exclusion of striker Robbie Fowler from the match-day squad, with Houllier confirming the striker had been left out after a training ground bust-up with assistant manager Phil Thompson: "It is a regrettable moment for the team and the club but I'm sure at some stage common sense will prevail. I am leaving it to him. I brokered a get-together between Phil and Robbie, which I attended at the beginning. Then I left the two Scousers together. But so far it has been unsuccessful." Houllier added that he had tried to resolve the issue before the start of the match: "I waited until the Sunday lunchtime before the Charity Shield game. I again insisted yesterday. I took them together again. I think at some stage it will be solved. I am a patient man."

Manchester United manager Ferguson was critical of the performance of referee D'Urso: "I felt sorry for the referee today, it doesn't matter how much training you have in any job. It's about temperament, and I just think the lad was too nervous for that today." Despite losing their fourth consecutive Charity Shield match, Ferguson did not believe it would affect his team heading into the start of the season: "We certainly hope we can go on to win the title again like we have in previous years. We just need to keep the standards up and show the desire we did in the second half." He was also unsure whether Liverpool would be able to challenge for the Premier League: "It's difficult to assess Liverpool at the moment. They started with confidence, but then you would expect that from a team that won three trophies a few months ago. You would also expect us to be sluggish at the start, because we are bloody good at it."

The match was marred by a series of hooligan incidents occurring near the stadium. It was being played the day before a Cardiff City game; a group of Cardiff City fans entered the Prince of Wales public house in the city to find it occupied by Manchester United fans staying in the city overnight. A series of running battles between fans of the two clubs followed, resulting in 22 arrests (including two boys aged just 11 and 13) as well as a man suffering stab wounds and a police officer suffering a broken arm. On the day of the game, an army of around 50 Cardiff and Liverpool hooligans were seen attacking United supporters in the Wood Street area.
