= Raimond van der Gouw =

Dutch footballer (born 1963)

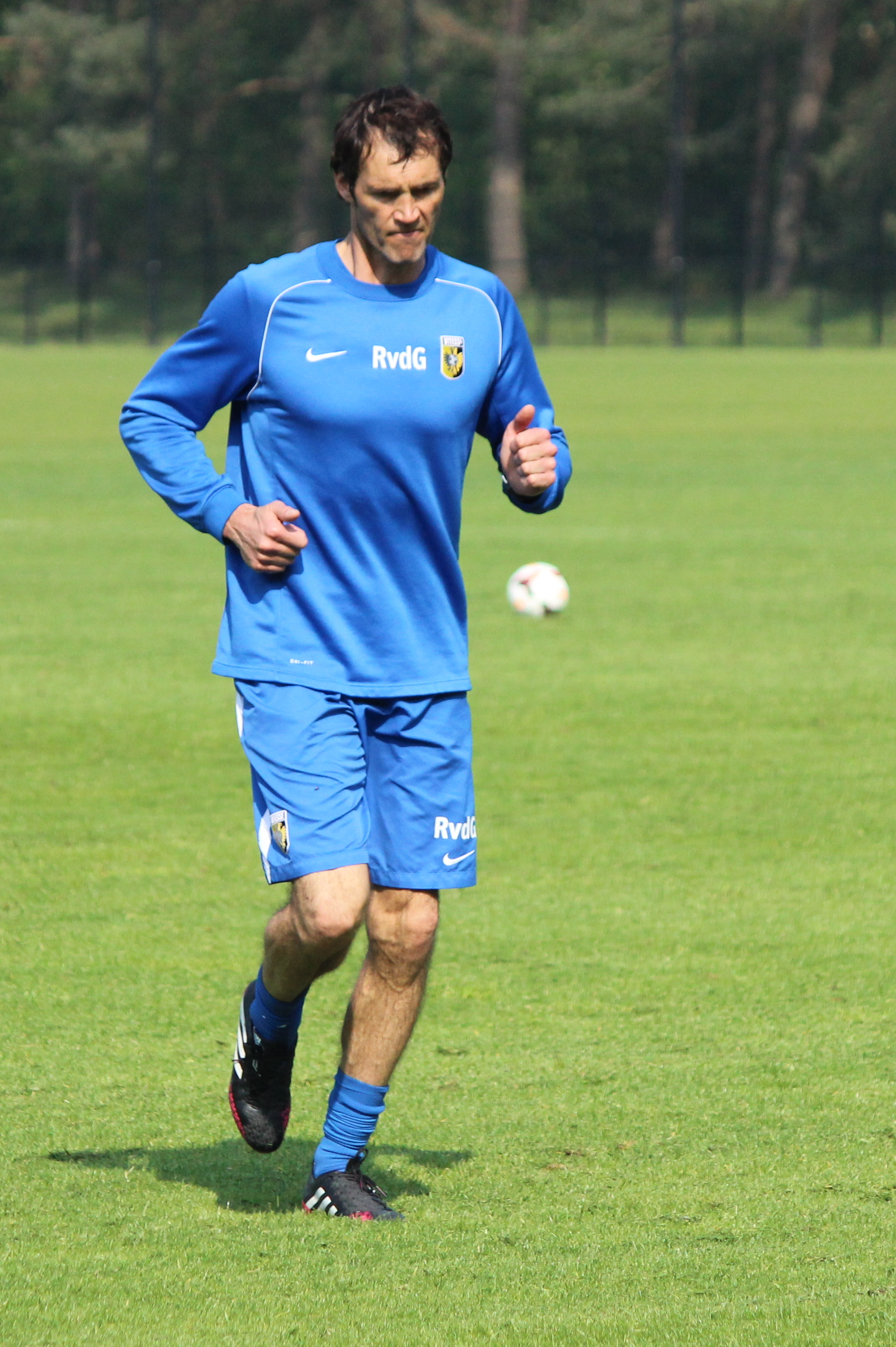
- Van der Gouw with Vitesse

Personal information
- Full name: Raimundus Johannes Hendrikus van der Gouw
- Date of birth: 24 March 1963 (age 63)
- Place of birth: Oldenzaal, Netherlands
- Height: 1.91 m (6 ft 3 in)
- Position: Goalkeeper

Team information
- Current team: Al Ahli (goalkeeping coach)

Youth career
- FC Berghuizen
- Go Ahead Eagles

Senior career*
Years	Team	Apps	(Gls)
1985–1988	Go Ahead Eagles	97	(0)
1988–1996	Vitesse	258	(0)
1996–2002	Manchester United	37	(0)
2002–2003	West Ham United	0	(0)
2003–2004	RKC	1	(0)
2004–2007	AGOVV	100	(1)
Total		493	(1)
- * Club domestic league appearances and goals

Raimundus Johannes Hendrikus "Raimond" van der Gouw (Dutch pronunciation: [ˈreːmɔnt fɑn dər ˈɣʌu]; (Note: In isolation, Van is pronounced [vɑn].) born 24 March 1963) is a Dutch former professional footballer, who played as a goalkeeper.

After a successful career with Vitesse in his native Netherlands, and well into his 30s, he moved to Manchester United where he made 61 appearances over six seasons and won two Premier League titles as well as a host of other honours as backup goalkeeper. He scored his only goal, for AGOVV, in the last game of his career, before retiring at the age of 44 and becoming a coach.

== Career ==
=== Netherlands ===
Van der Gouw's first club was hometown club FC Berghuizen whom he left for professional side Go Ahead Eagles. A product of the club's youth system, he made his debut for the first team in a 2–1 victory against Den Bosch, on 14 September 1985. At the time, Eagles were competing in the bottom half of the first division, achieving a tenth-placed finish in the player's first season. However, the club experienced relegation in 1987, and failed to achieve promotion the following season. After 97 league appearances, Van der Gouw joined second level's Vitesse.

His first season for Vitesse saw the club win the Eerste Divisie title, and promotion to the top flight of Dutch football for the first time in nine seasons. The following season saw further progress; a fourth-place finish in 1989–90 saw Vitesse qualify for the UEFA Cup for the first time in its history. The club also reached the final of the domestic cup.

In European competition, as Vitesse reached the UEFA Cup quarter-finals, Van der Gouw kept four consecutive clean sheets, before the side eventually lost to Sporting CP. Vitesse consistently finished in the top six in subsequent seasons, but were less impressive in Europe, suffering a 3–0 aggregate defeat to Norwich City, among other results.

=== England ===
Having played more than 350 league games in the Netherlands, Van der Gouw was an experienced choice for taking Tony Coton's place when the latter departed to Sunderland, and joined Manchester United for a fee of £500,000.

Van der Gouw's experience played a part in United's successes, both as a player and as goalkeeping coach at the club. His United debut came against Aston Villa on 21 September 1996, when he kept a clean sheet. A notable appearance came against Borussia Dortmund in the semi-final of the 1996–97 UEFA Champions League, when Peter Schmeichel pulled out with injury just minutes before kick-off. United lost the match 1–0, but Van der Gouw helped keep the score down.

"Bosnich hadn't been that sharp, and I felt that Raimond could handle the big games. ...I felt that some people's games are suited to Europe, and that applies to Raimond. He gets around his area very quickly"

— Sir Alex Ferguson

In 1998, Van der Gouw again played in a crucial Champions League match for United, the second leg of the quarter-final against Monaco. In a spirited performance, he denied several clear chances to the opposition, and the 34-year-old Dutchman would have kept a clean sheet were it not for a powerful long range goal early on from David Trezeguet. The Red Devils drew 1–1 but were knocked out on away goals. Ever the teacher, Van der Gouw coached United's young goalkeepers for a while, but relinquished this role in 1998–99 when Coton rejoined the club, in the same capacity, although not with a playing contract.

In 1999–2000, for the first time in his United career, Van der Gouw played enough games to claim a Premier League medal; he made 23 appearances in all competitions during that season, of which 14 were in the Premier League. He started in 11 Premier League matches, and in three others he replaced the faltering Mark Bosnich as a substitute. This run of relatively regular play included United's defeat in the 1999 UEFA Super Cup, and he also featured in some of United's Champions League matches, including a notable performance against group rivals Sturm Graz – in which he made a string of saves, kept a clean sheet and stopped a penalty from Ivica Vastić. He also made his only appearance in a FIFA-organised tournament, against South Melbourne in the 2000 Club World Championship.

Following the arrival of Fabien Barthez, Van der Gouw resumed his role as a backup goalkeeper in 2000–01, being sent off for the only time in English competition, against Watford in the League Cup, on 31 October 2000. Despite having made only 26 starts in five seasons, and the arrival of Roy Carroll, he signed a one-year extension to his contract in the summer of 2001. Van der Gouw made his last appearance for the club on 11 May 2002, against Charlton Athletic in a goalless draw at Old Trafford on the final day of the season, and in the process became the oldest United player since the end of the Second World War, two months after his 39th birthday. He was the oldest player contracted to United throughout his six years at the club. However, this was one of only two substitute appearances in 2001–02, resulting in a free transfer to West Ham United in June 2002. He played 61 competitive games in six years for the Red Devils.

Having turned down a move to Coventry City, Van der Gouw signed a one-year deal with West Ham, with the option of a second. He did not play a competitive game for the club, and was released after one season following the club's relegation.

=== Later career ===
"He's got vast experience. I've worked with Raimond and I know he's a true professional who works extremely hard"

— Roy Keane

After leaving West Ham, Van der Gouw then returned to the Netherlands, where he joined RKC Waalwijk for the 2003–04 season, but only made one league appearance. He subsequently joined AGOVV, where a strong finish to 2005–06 enabled the team to reach the play-offs for top-flight promotion. Whilst at the club, he played 100 league matches and scored the only league goal of his career, a penalty in his last professional game. He retired from playing at the age of 44.

In June 2007, Van der Gouw returned to England as goalkeeping coach at Sunderland, linking up with former Manchester United teammate Roy Keane. He was brought in to work in conjunction with Tim Carter, who served in that capacity prior to Van der Gouw's arrival, and Carter eventually returned to coaching the team's academy players following the appointment.

After Ricky Sbragia resigned at the end of the 2008–09 season, and Steve Bruce was subsequently appointed as the new manager, Van der Gouw left Sunderland to return to his old club Vitesse, also as goalkeeping coach.

He later worked for Shakhtar Donetsk and shortly for TOP Oss, before joining Saudi outfit Al Ahli in summer 2026.

== Personal life ==
His son Ennio van der Gouw is a goalkeeper in Belgium at Zulte Waregem.

== Career statistics ==
Appearances and goals by club, season and competition
Club	Season	League			National cup		League cup		Continental		Total	
Club	Season	Division	Apps	Goals	Apps	Goals	Apps	Goals	Apps	Goals	Apps	Goals
Go Ahead Eagles	1985–86	Eredivisie	28	0								
Go Ahead Eagles	1986–87	Eredivisie	34	0								
Go Ahead Eagles	1987–88	Eerste Divisie	35	0								
Go Ahead Eagles	Total		77	0								
Vitesse	1988–89	Eerste Divisie	36	0								
Vitesse	1989–90	Eredivisie	34	0								
Vitesse	1990–91	Eredivisie	31	0								
Vitesse	1991–92	Eredivisie	34	0								
Vitesse	1992–93	Eredivisie	34	0								
Vitesse	1993–94	Eredivisie	34	0								
Vitesse	1994–95	Eredivisie	34	0								
Vitesse	1995–96	Eredivisie	21	0								
Vitesse	Total		258	0								
Manchester United	1996–97	Premier League	2	0	0	0	2	0	1	0	5	0
Manchester United	1997–98	Premier League	5	0	0	0	1	0	1	0	7	0
Manchester United	1998–99	Premier League	5	0	0	0	3	0	0	0	8	0
Manchester United	1999–2000	Premier League	14	0	0	0	0	0	9	0	23	0
Manchester United	2000–01	Premier League	10	0	1	0	2	0	2	0	15	0
Manchester United	2001–02	Premier League	1	0	0	0	1	0	0	0	2	0
Manchester United	Total		37	0	1	0	9	0	13	0	60	0
West Ham United	2002–03	Premier League	0	0	0	0	0	0	0	0	0	0
RKC Waalwijk	2003–04	Eredivisie	1	0								
AGOVV	2004–05	Eerste Divisie	29	0								
AGOVV	2005–06	Eerste Divisie	33	0								
AGOVV	2006–07	Eerste Divisie	38	1								
AGOVV	Total		100	1								
Career total			473	1								

== Honours ==
Vitesse

- Eerste Divisie: 1988–89

Manchester United

- Premier League: 1999–2000, 2000–01
- FA Cup: 1998–99
- FA Charity Shield: 1996, 1997
- UEFA Champions League: 1998–99
