= Quinton Fortune =

South African soccer player (born 1977)

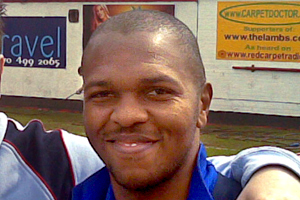
- Fortune in 2007

Personal information
- Date of birth: 21 May 1977 (age 49)
- Place of birth: Cape Town, South Africa
- Height: 5 ft 11 in (1.80 m)
- Positions: Midfielder; left-back

Youth career
- 1991–1995: Tottenham Hotspur

Senior career*
| Years | Team | Apps | (Gls) |
| 1995 | Mallorca | 8 | (1) |
| 1996–1999 | Atlético Madrid B | 61 | (6) |
| 1996–1999 | Atlético Madrid | 6 | (0) |
| 1999–2006 | Manchester United | 76 | (5) |
| 2006–2007 | Bolton Wanderers | 6 | (0) |
| 2008 | Brescia | 1 | (0) |
| 2009 | Tubize | 9 | (0) |
| 2009–2010 | Doncaster Rovers | 6 | (1) |
| Total | | 173 | (13) |

International career
| 1996–2005 | South Africa | 46 | (2) |

Managerial career
- 2020–2022: Reading (assistant)
- 2023: Guadalajara (assistant)
- 2024–2025: Tigres UANL (assistant)
- 2025-: Serbia (assistant)
- * Club domestic league appearances and goals

Quinton Fortune (born 21 May 1977) is a South African professional soccer coach and former player, who played as a midfielder or left-back. After stints with Mallorca and Atlético Madrid, he settled with Manchester United in 1999 and spent seven years there, winning a Premier League title, FA Community Shield and Intercontinental Cup.

Fortune played internationally for South Africa from 1996 to 2005, earning 46 caps. He was part of the South Africa squad for the 1998 and 2002 FIFA World Cups.

== Club career ==
Fortune began his professional football career with Tottenham Hotspur. In 1995, he moved to Spain to play for Mallorca, but soon moved on to Atlético Madrid, where he mostly played for the B team. In August 1999, Fortune had a trial at Manchester United, prompting manager Alex Ferguson to sign him for a fee of £1.5 million; Fortune turned down a move to Real Valladolid to secure the move to Manchester United. He made his first appearance for the club against Newcastle United on 30 August. His first goal followed on Boxing Day 1999 against Bradford City, and he scored twice against South Melbourne in the 2000 FIFA Club World Championship.

Despite playing in three Premier League winning seasons (1999–2000, 2000–01 and 2002–03), Fortune never played the required 10 games stipulated to earn a winner's medal. However, he was awarded a Premier League winner's medal by special dispensation following United's title success in 2003 during which he had appeared nine times in the league that season. It is commonly incorrectly reported that this medal had been left at the club by a former player. After being used mostly in a squad rotation basis for his career at Manchester United, he was released by the club ahead of the 2006–07 campaign.

After a successful trial, Fortune joined Bolton Wanderers for the 2006–07 season.

In September 2008, he joined Sheffield United on trial. On 6 October 2008, Serie B club Brescia confirmed to have reached an agreement with Fortune; the transfer was finalised on 23 October, with Fortune signing a one-year contract with the Rondinelle.

On 2 February 2009, Tubize signed Fortune on a free transfer.

On 4 August 2009, he signed a short-term deal at Doncaster Rovers. He scored his first Rovers goal against Ipswich Town on 19 September 2009. He was sent off in a 2–2 draw against Scunthorpe United. Fortune was not offered an extension to his deal at the club and was released on 4 February 2010.

== International career ==
Fortune earned 46 caps for South Africa, and played at the 1998 and the 2002 World Cups. He was one of South Africa's most influential players in the 2002 World Cup. In the first match against Paraguay which ended in 2–2 draw, he scored South Africa's second goal from a penalty kick in injury time. Later in the next match, South Africa beat Slovenia 1–0 in which Fortune providing assist for the winning goal. Although both South Africa and Paraguay finished the group with same points and goal difference, it was Paraguay who occupied the second place and advanced into the next stage because Paraguay scored more goals than South Africa.

== Coaching and media career ==
In 2012, Fortune returned to Manchester United to train with their reserve team while working on his coaching badges, which he completed in 2013. On 1 July 2014, Fortune was assistant coach to Cardiff City's Under-21 side. Fortune also worked for ITV4 during their coverage of the Africa Cup of Nations in February 2015. On 4 July 2019, Fortune became Under-23 assistant coach at Manchester United. On 8 September 2020, Fortune was appointed as first-team coach of Reading.

On 16 August 2022, Fortune was appointed as a coach supporting the England youth teams as part of The Football Association and Professional Footballers' Association's joint England Elite Coach Programme (EECP).

In November 2022, Fortune was appointed as an assistant coach for Mexican club Guadalajara alongside his former teammate Veljko Paunović.

== Charity work ==
Fortune has worked as a model for an anti-domestic violence group called Tender as part of their "Don't Kick Off" campaign. This campaign ran through the 2010 FIFA World Cup to stop men from using football as an excuse for violence against women.

Since 2018, Fortune has worked with Grassroot Soccer, a global adolescent health organization with a South African affiliate that leverages the power of soccer to equip young people with the life-saving information, services, and mentorship they need to live healthier lives. Fortune is a Global Ambassador for the organization and a member of its UK Board of Directors.

== Career statistics ==
International goals

Score and results list South Africa's goal tally first.

| # | Date | Venue | Opponent | Score | Result | Competition |
|---|---|---|---|---|---|---|
| 1 | 2 June 2002 | Busan Asiad Main Stadium, Busan, South Korea | Paraguay | 2–2 | 2–2 | 2002 FIFA World Cup |
| 2 | 26 March 2005 | FNB Stadium, Johannesburg, South Africa | Uganda | 1–0 | 2–1 | 2006 FIFA World Cup qualifying |

== Honours ==
Manchester United

- Premier League: 2002–03
- FA Community Shield: 2003
- Intercontinental Cup: 1999

South Africa

- African Cup of Nations runner-up: 1998
