= Nicky Butt =

English footballer (born 1975)

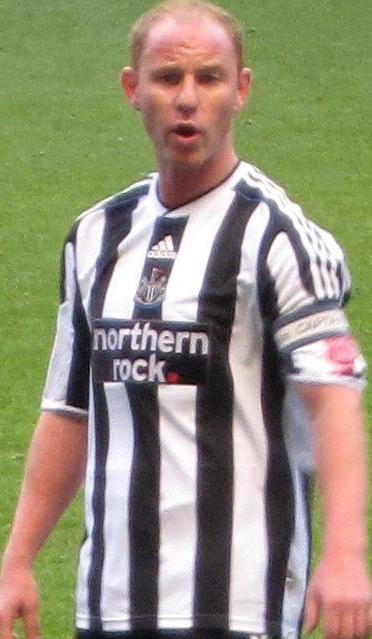
- Butt playing for Newcastle United in 2009

Personal information
- Full name: Nicholas Butt
- Date of birth: 21 January 1975 (age 51)
- Place of birth: Gorton, Manchester, England
- Height: 5 ft 10 in (1.78 m)
- Position: Midfielder

Team information
- Current team: Salford City (chief executive officer)

Youth career
- 1991–1992: Manchester United

Senior career*
Years	Team	Apps	(Gls)
1992–2004	Manchester United	270	(21)
2004–2010	Newcastle United	134	(5)
2005–2006	→ Birmingham City (loan)	24	(3)
2010–2011	South China	13	(1)
Total		441	(30)

International career
1992–1993	England U18	5	(0)
1992	England U19	1	(0)
1994–1996	England U21	7	(0)
1997–2004	England	39	(0)

Managerial career
- 2016–2017: Manchester United U23 (interim)
Medal record
Representing England
Men's football
FIFA World Youth Championship
Third place	1993 Australia
- * Club domestic league appearances and goals

Nicholas Butt (born 21 January 1975) is an English football coach and former player who was a co-owner of League Two club Salford City. Butt played professional football as a midfielder from 1992 to 2011. He spent the majority of his career with Manchester United, where he won six Premier League titles, three FA Cups, four FA Community Shields, the UEFA Champions League and the Intercontinental Cup.

Butt moved to Newcastle United in 2004. He spent one season on loan to Birmingham City in 2005–06. He finished his career abroad, playing for South China where he won the Hong Kong League Cup.

Butt earned 39 caps for England between 1997 and 2004. He was chosen for the 2002 FIFA World Cup and UEFA Euro 2004.

== Club career ==
=== Manchester United ===
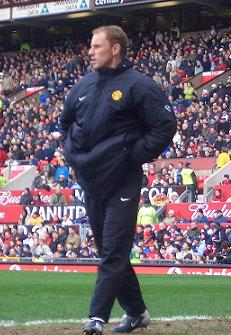
Butt on the sidelines at Old Trafford in March 2004

Born in Gorton, Manchester, Butt began his career at Manchester United as an important part of their youth team before turning professional in 1993.

He made his first-team debut in the 1992–93 season as a substitute against Oldham Athletic in a 3–0 Premier League win on 21 November 1992, but did not get his big break in the team until the 1994–95 season, often covering for Roy Keane in the event of injuries and suspension. One of his first appearances for the first team came in the FA Cup semi-final on 10 April 1994, also against Oldham as a substitute, this time in a 1–1 draw at Wembley Stadium. United won the replay 4–1 at Maine Road but he was not included in the squad. 1994–95 saw Butt play 35 games in all competitions, scoring one goal and featuring in the starting eleven for the FA Cup final, which United lost to Everton.

With the departure of Paul Ince to Internazionale in the 1995 close season, manager Alex Ferguson chose to draft in Butt as Ince's successor in midfield alongside Roy Keane. Butt was part of a notable batch of talented, young Manchester United players dubbed Fergie's Fledglings, who had mostly been involved in United's FA Youth Cup-winning triumph of 1992 and gradually been introduced into the first team over the next few seasons. Others included David Beckham, Gary Neville, Phil Neville and Paul Scholes – who all spent a decade or more in the Old Trafford team's first team and helped the club win numerous major trophies as the dominant force in English football.

Butt performed remarkably in his early seasons as a regular first team player at United, and often started in the lineup, scoring crucial goals, such as against Liverpool in Eric Cantona's comeback match in October 1995, and forcing Nigel Winterburn to concede an own goal for the winner against Arsenal in November 1996 – a game which saw the end of a three-match losing run in the league. Butt also functioned as a steady replacement for Roy Keane as the midfield ball winner, while Keane was injured for much of the 1997–98 season, earning a PFA Team of the Year award that year. However, Keane returned and after forward Paul Scholes was re-deployed as a midfielder around the end of the 1990s. Butt's first-team chances started to become increasingly limited, with many of his appearances coming from the bench from this stage onwards.

Butt still went on to collect many honours at United, as the club capped their domination of the 1990s with a remarkable and unique treble win in 1999 (with Butt playing the whole of the Champions League Final due to Roy Keane being suspended), and several more titles in the years up till 2001. By the time of his departure from Old Trafford, Butt had gained six Premier League title winner's medals, three FA Cup winner's medals and a Champions League winner's medal. He had also collected an FA Cup runners-up medal in 1995.

=== Newcastle United ===
Butt handed in a transfer request in January 2004, but turned down a proposed move to Birmingham City during the January transfer window. He was signed by Bobby Robson for Newcastle United in July 2004 for a fee of £2.5 million on a four-year deal, where he was seen as a replacement for the veteran Gary Speed, who had moved to Bolton Wanderers.

Butt had a disappointing and injury-marred 2004–05 season, prompting the then Newcastle manager Graeme Souness to sign Senegalese midfielder Amdy Faye in January 2005. Despite a promising start, the fans turned on Butt after the 4–1 defeat against Manchester United in the FA Cup semi-final. The acquisition of Scott Parker and Emre in the summer of 2005 pushed Butt further down the pecking order, and his move to Birmingham City (managed by former Manchester United teammate Steve Bruce) on a season-long loan was announced on 3 August 2005.

However, on 13 February 2006, Butt walked out on his manager and former Manchester United teammate Steve Bruce, after finding out Bruce placed his son Alex Bruce in the squad ahead of him, and was later fined two weeks wages. After Birmingham were relegated from the Premier League, Butt returned to Newcastle who were being managed by Glenn Roeder.

Although not an instant fan favourite at St. James' Park, Butt won over some fans with two goals scored through headers in a pre-season friendly against Villarreal. There was some speculation that newly appointed Sunderland manager Roy Keane would try to sign his former Manchester United midfield partner. However, due to the lack of back-up midfielders at Newcastle and his good pre-season form, Butt remained at Newcastle.

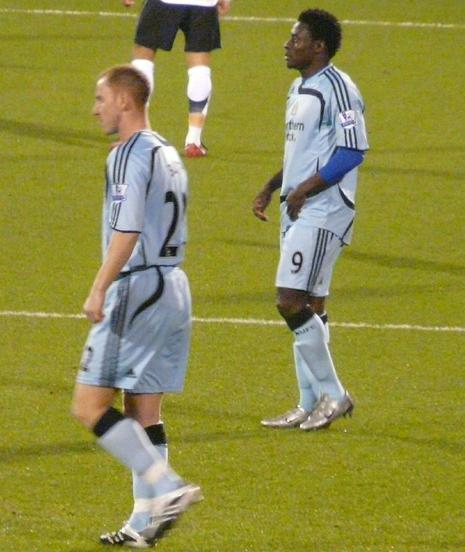
Butt with Newcastle teammate Obafemi Martins in 2007

During the 2006–07 season, Butt was much more involved in the first team at Newcastle, playing in the holding role which allowed the likes of Parker and Emre to go forward. On 14 January 2007, Butt scored his first Newcastle goal in over 2 years when he scored the winner against Tottenham Hotspur in a 3–2 victory at White Hart Lane. Butt's return to form was encapsulated when he captained Newcastle in a UEFA Cup match against Zulte Waregem on 15 February when Parker was injured. His good form that season continued, as on 9 April, Butt won the man of the match award for his performance against Arsenal. He continued to captain Newcastle whenever Parker was injured, and by the end of the season it was widely considered that he had won over the Newcastle fans.

With Parker having moved to West Ham United, Butt continued to play a big part in Newcastle's 2007–08 campaign. On 21 December, he penned a new contract keeping him at the club until the end of next season. After being an almost ever-present in that season, he expressed a desire to finish his career with Newcastle. Butt also started the season as captain, filling in for the injured Michael Owen, and proved to be a popular choice. Butt played his 100th league game for Newcastle on 21 December 2008, marking it with a 2–1 home win against Tottenham. Newcastle were eventually relegated that season, meaning that Butt's record of playing in every Premier League season has been relinquished.

Butt was made permanent club captain for the 2009–10 season, his first outside the top flight, following Michael Owen's departure to Manchester United as a free agent during the summer transfer window. However, vice-captain Alan Smith's impressive form saw him take the armband more often than Butt. Butt started fewer games, but still effectively carried out his holding role well, leading his side to gritty shutouts in most of the games he started.

The club eventually won both promotion to the Premier League and the Championship title, and Butt announced his retirement in the build-up to Newcastle's last home game against Ipswich Town. He entered his penultimate game as a substitute and won a penalty en route to a 2–2 draw. Butt lifted the Championship trophy alongside vice-captain Alan Smith.

After leaving Newcastle he was backed by former Newcastle boss Chris Hughton to move into coaching, although a coaching position with Newcastle is not something Hughton had spoken with Butt about.

=== South China ===
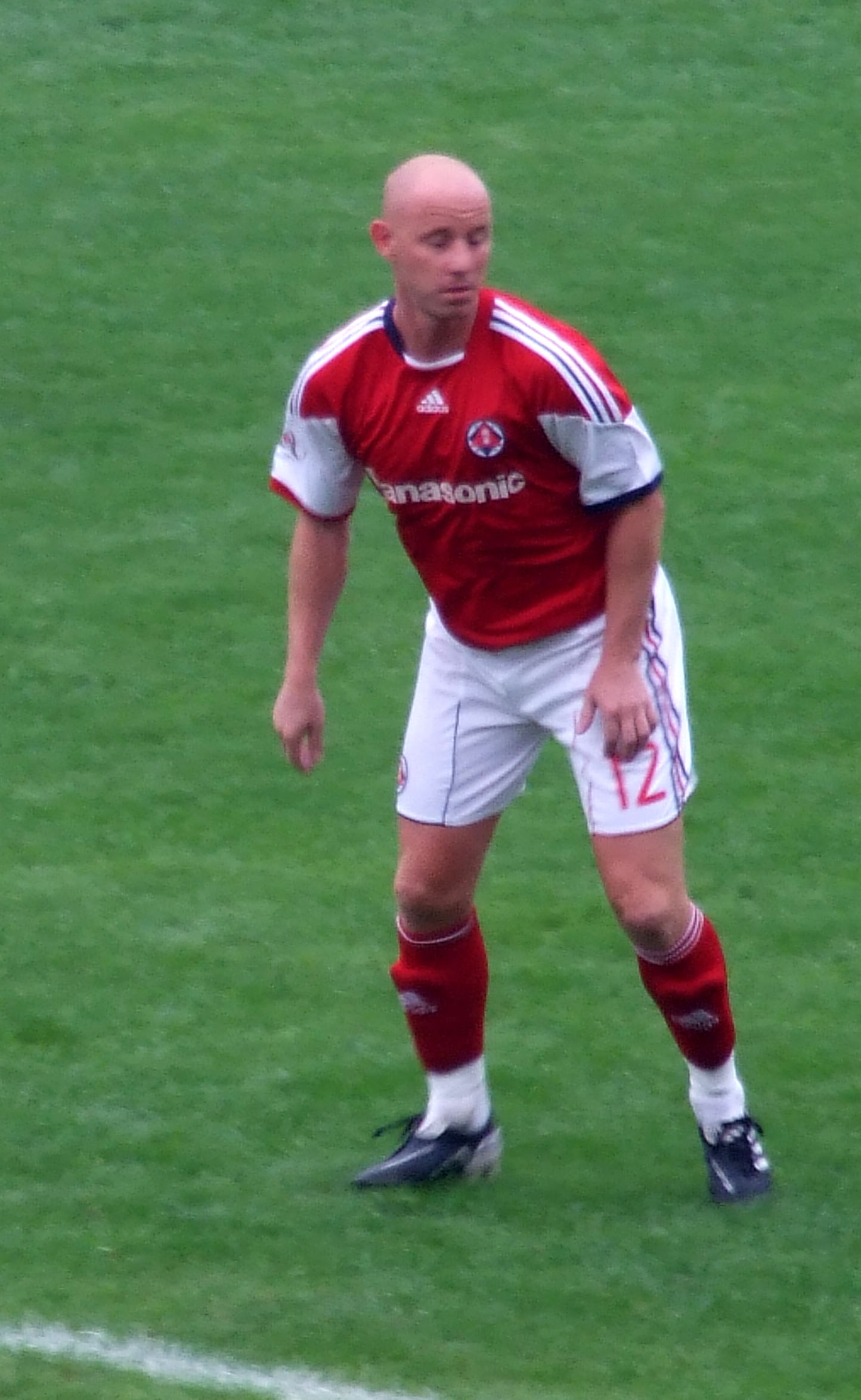
Butt playing for South China against TSW Pegasus in the Hong Kong League Cup final, 2011

On 6 November 2010, the chairman of Hong Kong club South China, Steven Lo, said that the club expected Butt to sign for them at the end of the month. Butt signed for South China on 22 November. Wearing the No. 8 shirt, his first match was against TSW Pegasus in a 2–1 win for South China. Butt scored from a free kick during this game but also missed a penalty.

After leaving South China, he featured in Gary Neville's testimonial against Juventus on 24 May 2011 in central midfield alongside Paul Scholes, rekindling the old times in a midfield that also contained David Beckham. However, they lost the game to the Old Lady. Butt also featured in midfield for Eric Cantona's New York Cosmos in Scholes' testimonial match against Manchester United at Old Trafford on 5 August 2011.

== International career ==
Having been capped five times at under-21 level, he won his first England cap during the 1996–97 season against Mexico and became a squad regular, providing reliable backup for the central midfield positions. An injury to first choice midfielder Steven Gerrard before the 2002 FIFA World Cup gave Butt his chance in the starting line-up alongside Manchester United teammates David Beckham and Paul Scholes. Ahead of England's quarter-final game against Brazil, he was named "the best player of the England squad" by Brazilian legend Pelé, a compliment to his performance in the unattractive holding role. England eventually exited the World Cup after a 2–1 defeat to Brazil.

After the World Cup he returned to his role as a squad player, providing experienced cover for the first-choice midfield pairing of Steven Gerrard and Frank Lampard. He was selected for UEFA Euro 2004, but missed the tournament through injury. His last international appearance was in a friendly against Spain on 17 November 2004. In total he appeared 39 times for England.

== Post-playing career ==
=== Coaching ===
In October 2012, Butt returned to Manchester United as a coach for the club's reserve team. He was appointed head of the academy in February 2016, a few months after the departure of Brian McClair. Since November 2016, he has filled in as interim coach of the reserve (under-23) team after Warren Joyce left for the managerial position at Wigan Athletic. He briefly served as assistant to Ryan Giggs, after Giggs was made the interim manager of the Manchester United first team, following the departure of David Moyes.

In July 2019, Manchester United restructured their backroom staff, making Butt the head of first-team development, reporting directly to manager Ole Gunnar Solskjær to help improve the transition for young players from the youth team to the first team. Nick Cox replaced Butt as head of the academy. In March 2021, it was announced that Butt was to leave Manchester United after 9 years there in various coaching roles within their academy.

=== Business interests ===
In 2014, it was announced that Butt, along with fellow ex-Manchester United players Ryan Giggs, Paul Scholes, and Gary and Phil Neville had agreed a deal to purchase Salford City ahead of the 2014–15 season. with plans to get the club to the Football League. The group announced they would take part in a special friendly, with Salford facing a Class of '92 team. On 22 September, the group agreed to sell a 50% stake in the club to billionaire Peter Lim.

On 31 October 2022, Salford City announced the appointment of Butt as the club's chief executive officer, taking over from Gary Neville who had served in that role in a part-time capacity for eight years. On 15 October 2024, Butt announced he was stepping down as CEO of Salford to pursue coaching opportunities.

== Personal life ==
Butt was arrested and bailed for assaulting a woman in 2004. Butt married his long-time girlfriend Shelley Barlow in 2008. They have two children. Butt was arrested for alleged domestic assault in April 2019 but the case was discontinued after the Crown Prosecution Service offered no evidence. Butt accepted a caution for criminal damage.

In June 2024, Butt was banned from driving for a year and ordered to undertake 100 hours of unpaid work for breaking a motorcyclist's leg during an accident caused by Butt's "lapse of concentration".

== Career statistics ==
=== Club ===
Appearances and goals by club, season and competition
Club	Season	League			National cup (Note: Includes FA Cup, Hong Kong FA Cup)		League cup (Note: Includes Football League Cup, Hong Kong League Cup)		Continental		Other		Total	
Club	Season	Division	Apps	Goals	Apps	Goals	Apps	Goals	Apps	Goals	Apps	Goals	Apps	Goals
Manchester United	1992–93	Premier League	1	0	0	0	0	0	0	0	–		1	0
Manchester United	1993–94	Premier League	1	0	1	0	0	0	0	0	0	0	2	0
Manchester United	1994–95	Premier League	22	1	4	0	3	0	6 (Note: Appearances in UEFA Champions League)	0	0	0	35	1
Manchester United	1995–96	Premier League	32	2	7	1	0	0	2 (Note: Appearances in UEFA Cup)	0	–		41	3
Manchester United	1996–97	Premier League	26	5	0	0	0	0	9	0	1 (Note: Appearance in FA Charity Shield)	1	36	6
Manchester United	1997–98	Premier League	33	3	1	0	0	0	7	0	1	0	42	3
Manchester United	1998–99	Premier League	31	2	5	0	2	0	8	0	1	0	47	2
Manchester United	1999–2000	Premier League	32	3	–		0	0	6	0	4 (Note: One appearance in FA Charity Shield, one appearance in Intercontinental Cup, two appearances and one goal in FIFA Club World Championship)	1	42	4
Manchester United	2000–01	Premier League	28	3	2	0	0	0	11	1	0	0	41	4
Manchester United	2001–02	Premier League	25	1	2	0	0	0	9	0	1	0	37	1
Manchester United	2002–03	Premier League	18	0	2	0	1	0	8	0	–		29	0
Manchester United	2003–04	Premier League	21	1	5	0	2	0	5	1	1 (Note: Appearance in FA Community Shield)	0	34	2
Manchester United	Total		270	21	29	1	8	0	71	2	9	2	387	26
Newcastle United	2004–05	Premier League	18	1	2	0	1	0	7	0	–		28	1
Newcastle United	2005–06	Premier League	0	0	0	0	0	0	2 (Note: Appearances in UEFA Intertoto Cup)	0	–		2	0
Newcastle United	2006–07	Premier League	31	1	2	0	2	0	12 (Note: One appearance in UEFA Intertoto Cup, eleven appearances in UEFA Cup)	0	–		47	1
Newcastle United	2007–08	Premier League	35	3	2	0	2	0	–		–		39	3
Newcastle United	2008–09	Premier League	33	0	2	0	2	0	–		–		37	0
Newcastle United	2009–10	Championship	17	0	2	0	1	0	–		–		20	0
Newcastle United	Total		134	5	10	0	8	0	21	0	–		173	5
Birmingham City (loan)	2005–06	Premier League	24	3	2	0	3	0	–		–		29	3
South China	2010–11	Hong Kong First Division League	3	1	1	0	2	1	5 (Note: Appearance in AFC Cup)	0	2 (Note: Appearances in Hong Kong Senior Shield)	0	13	2
Total			431	30	41	1	21	1	97	2	11	2	601	36

=== International ===
Appearances and goals by national team and year
National team	Year	Apps	Goals
England	1997	4	0
England	1998	3	0
England	1999	1	0
England	2000	1	0
England	2001	6	0
England	2002	10	0
England	2003	6	0
England	2004	8	0
Total		39	0

== Honours ==
Manchester United

- Premier League: 1995–96, 1996–97, 1998–99, 1999–2000, 2000–01, 2002–03
- FA Cup: 1995–96, 2003–04
- FA Charity/Community Shield: 1994, 1996, 1997, 2003
- UEFA Champions League: 1998–99
- Intercontinental Cup: 1999
- Football League Cup runner-up: 2002–03

Newcastle United

- Football League Championship: 2009–10
- UEFA Intertoto Cup: 2006

South China

- Hong Kong League Cup: 2010–11

England U18

- UEFA European Under-18 Championship: 1993

Individual

- Denzil Haroun Reserve Team Player of the Year: 1993–94
- PFA Team of the Year: 1997–98 Premier League
- Newcastle United Player of the Year: 2006–07
- The Telegraph: The Premier League's 100 Best Players (No. 69)
