= 1996 FA Charity Shield =

- The match programme cover
Manchester United	Newcastle United
4	0
- Date: 11 August 1996
- Venue: Wembley Stadium, London
- Man of the Match: Eric Cantona
- Referee: Paul Durkin (Dorset)
- Attendance: 73,214

The 1996 FA Charity Shield (also known as the Littlewoods FA Charity Shield for sponsorship reasons) was the 74th FA Charity Shield, an annual football match played between the winners of the previous season's Premier League and FA Cup competitions. The match was played on 11 August 1996 at Wembley Stadium and contested by Manchester United, who had won the Double of Premier League and FA Cup in 1995–96, and Newcastle United, who had finished as runners-up in the Premier League. Manchester United won the match 4–0 with goals from Eric Cantona, Nicky Butt, David Beckham and Roy Keane.

The game saw new signings Jordi Cruyff and Karel Poborský make their debuts for Manchester United, though neither of these players had particularly successful careers at Old Trafford and both had left the club within four years. The day before the game had seen the surprise sale of one of Manchester United's longest serving players – Lee Sharpe.

The game saw Newcastle United give a debut to £15 million world record signing Alan Shearer, who would remain at the club until his retirement as a player 10 years later and break the club's goalscoring record in the process, though he would never win a major trophy with them.

== Match details ==
11 August 1996
15:00 UTC+1

Manchester United	4–0	Newcastle United
Cantona 24'; Butt 30'; Beckham 85'; Keane 87'	Report

Wembley Stadium, London
Attendance: 73,214
Referee: Paul Durkin (Dorset)

Manchester United	Newcastle United

GK	1	(Denmark) Peter Schmeichel
RB	12	(England) Phil Neville
CB	6	(England) Gary Pallister
CB	4	(England) David May
LB	3	(Republic of Ireland) Denis Irwin		(substituted off) 46'
RM	10	(England) David Beckham
CM	8	(England) Nicky Butt		(substituted off) 41'
CM	16	(Republic of Ireland) Roy Keane	(yellow card) 40'
LM	11	(Wales) Ryan Giggs
CF	18	(England) Paul Scholes		(substituted off) 65'
CF	7	(France) Eric Cantona (c)	(yellow card) 65'
Substitutes:
GK	17	(Netherlands) Raimond van der Gouw
DF	2	(England) Gary Neville		(substituted on) 46'
DF	19	(Norway) Ronny Johnsen
MF	14	(Netherlands) Jordi Cruyff		(substituted on) 65'
MF	15	(Czech Republic) Karel Poborský		(substituted on) 41'
FW	13	(Scotland) Brian McClair
FW	20	(Norway) Ole Gunnar Solskjær
Manager:
(Scotland) Alex Ferguson

GK	1	(Czech Republic) Pavel Srníček
RB	19	(England) Steve Watson
CB	5	(England) Darren Peacock
CB	27	(Belgium) Philippe Albert	(yellow card) 16'
LB	3	(England) John Beresford
RM	8	(England) Peter Beardsley (c)		(substituted off) 75'
CM	4	(England) David Batty
CM	7	(England) Rob Lee
LM	14	(France) David Ginola		(substituted off) 77'
CF	9	(England) Alan Shearer
CF	10	(England) Les Ferdinand
Substitutes:
GK	15	(Trinidad and Tobago) Shaka Hislop
DF	2	(England) Warren Barton
DF	6	(England) Steve Howey
MF	18	(Northern Ireland) Keith Gillespie		(substituted on) 77'
MF	20	(England) Lee Clark
FW	11	(Colombia) Faustino Asprilla		(substituted on) 75'
FW	28	(England) Paul Kitson
Manager:
(England) Kevin Keegan

Match officials

- Assistant referees:
  - David Horlick (Merseyside)
  - Alan Sheffield (Staffordshire)
- Reserve official: Peter Jones (Leicestershire)

Match rules

- 90 minutes
- Penalty shootout if scores level
- Seven named substitutes
- Maximum of three substitutions

== Sources ==
- 1996 Final
- MAN UNITED 4 NEWCASTLE 0

== See also ==
- 1995–96 FA Premier League
- 1995–96 FA Cup
