= 1997 FA Charity Shield =

- The match programme cover
Chelsea	Manchester United
1	1
- Manchester United won 4–2 on penalties
- Date: 3 August 1997
- Venue: Wembley Stadium, London
- Man of the Match: Roy Keane
- Referee: Peter Jones (Leicestershire)
- Attendance: 73,636

The 1997 FA Charity Shield (known as the Littlewoods FA Charity Shield for sponsorship reasons) was the 75th FA Charity Shield, an annual football match played between the winners of the previous season's Premier League and FA Cup competitions. The match was played on 3 August 1997 at Wembley Stadium and contested by Manchester United, who had won the 1996–97 FA Premier League, and Chelsea, who had won the 1996–97 FA Cup. Manchester United won the match 4–2 on penalties after the match had finished at 1–1 after 90 minutes.

The 1997 Charity Shield was a game of several "firsts". Manchester United's only goal of open play was from Ronny Johnsen, who scored his first goal in a competitive game for them. It was the first competitive appearance in a Manchester United shirt for Johnsen's teammate Teddy Sheringham, who had joined the club from Tottenham Hotspur five weeks earlier. It was also the first competitive appearance in a Chelsea shirt for goalkeeper Ed de Goey.

This match was also known for David Beckham having his shirt misspelled as "Beckam".

== Match details ==
3 August 1997
15:00 UTC+1

Chelsea	1–1	Manchester United
M. Hughes 52'	Report	Johnsen 58'
Penalties
Sinclair (penalty missed); Zola (penalty scored); Di Matteo (penalty missed); Leboeuf (penalty scored)	2–4	(penalty scored) Scholes; (penalty scored) Irwin; (penalty scored) Keane; (penalty scored) Butt

Wembley Stadium, London
Attendance: 73,636
Referee: Peter Jones (Leicestershire)

Chelsea	Manchester United

GK	1	(Netherlands) Ed de Goey
RB	6	(Scotland) Steve Clarke
CB	5	(France) Frank Leboeuf
CB	20	(Jamaica) Frank Sinclair	(yellow card) 26'
LB	17	(England) Danny Granville
CM	11	(England) Dennis Wise (c)	(yellow card) 30'
CM	28	(England) Jody Morris		(substituted off) 46'
CM	16	(Italy) Roberto Di Matteo
AM	8	(Uruguay) Gus Poyet
AM	25	(Italy) Gianfranco Zola
CF	10	(Wales) Mark Hughes		(substituted off) 77'
Substitutes:
GK	13	(England) Kevin Hitchcock
DF	2	(Romania) Dan Petrescu	(yellow card) 90'	(substituted on) 46'
DF	29	(England) Neil Clement
MF	4	(Netherlands) Ruud Gullit
MF	16	(England) Paul Hughes
FW	9	(Italy) Gianluca Vialli		(substituted on) 77'
FW	22	(England) Mark Nicholls
Player-Manager:
(Netherlands) Ruud Gullit

GK	1	(Denmark) Peter Schmeichel
RB	12	(England) Phil Neville
CB	6	(England) Gary Pallister
CB	5	(Norway) Ronny Johnsen
LB	3	(Republic of Ireland) Denis Irwin
RM	18	(England) Paul Scholes
CM	16	(Republic of Ireland) Roy Keane (c)
CM	8	(England) Nicky Butt
LM	11	(Wales) Ryan Giggs		(substituted off) 72'
SS	10	(England) Teddy Sheringham	(yellow card) 43'	(substituted off) 72'
CF	9	(England) Andy Cole
Substitutes:
GK	17	(Netherlands) Raimond van der Gouw
DF	2	(England) Gary Neville
MF	7	(England) David Beckham		(substituted on) 72'
MF	14	(Netherlands) Jordi Cruyff		(substituted on) 72'
MF	15	(Czech Republic) Karel Poborský
MF	23	(England) Ben Thornley
FW	13	(Scotland) Brian McClair
Manager:
(Scotland) Alex Ferguson

Match rules

- 90 minutes.
- Penalty shootout if scores level.
- Seven named substitutes.
- Maximum of three substitutions.

== See also ==
- 1996–97 FA Premier League
- 1996–97 FA Cup
