= 1993–94 Manchester United F.C. season =

English football club season

Manchester United
1993–94 season
- Chairman: Martin Edwards
- Manager: Alex Ferguson
- FA Premier League: 1st
- FA Cup: Winners
- League Cup: Runners-up
- UEFA Champions League: Second round
- Charity Shield: Winners
- Top goalscorer: League: Eric Cantona (18); All: Eric Cantona (25)
- Highest home attendance: 44,751 vs Liverpool (30 March 1994)
- Lowest home attendance: 35,781 vs Kispest Honvéd (29 September 1993)
- Average home league attendance: 44,244
Home colours	Away colours	Third colours

The 1993–94 season was Manchester United's second season in the Premier League, and their 19th consecutive season in the top division of English football. Manchester United won the Premier League and FA Cup to become only the fourth club in the 20th century to win the Double. Only a 3–1 defeat to Aston Villa in the League Cup final prevented them from winning a domestic treble.

They led the Premier League table from the fourth game onwards, and ended up winning the league by eight points over nearest rivals Blackburn Rovers, although their lead of the table had peaked at 16 points halfway through the season. French striker Eric Cantona scored 25 goals in all competitions and was voted PFA Player of the Year. Ryan Giggs, Lee Sharpe and Andrei Kanchelskis also hit the headlines with their brilliant form. In the FA Cup final, United crushed Chelsea 4–0 thanks to two penalties from Eric Cantona and a goal each from Mark Hughes and Brian McClair.

Roy Keane justified his tag as the most expensive footballer in England by establishing himself as the club's regular central midfielder alongside Paul Ince, while veterans Mark Hughes, Brian McClair and Steve Bruce continued to excel despite their advancing years. The end of the season saw the club's longest serving player and joint captain, Bryan Robson, quit Old Trafford after 13 years to become Middlesbrough's player-manager. Also heading out of the exit door at the end of the season were Les Sealey, Clayton Blackmore, Mike Phelan, Colin McKee, and Giuliano Maiorana. Dion Dublin, who was unable to reclaim a regular place in the first team, was linked with a move away from Old Trafford for much of the season, but a move to Everton in November fell through and he was still at the club when the season ended.

Ferguson's only close-season signing was David May from Blackburn Rovers. May, 24, was signed by Ferguson in hope that he would develop into an eventual long-term successor to Steve Bruce. United also had plenty of strength in depth with teenagers David Beckham, Nicky Butt, Gary Neville and Paul Scholes on the verge of making a breakthrough.

== Pre-season and friendlies ==
Date	Opponents	H / A	Result F–A	Scorers	Attendance
25 July 1993	Arsenal	N	0–2		65,000
29 July 1993	Kaizer Chiefs	A	1–1	Dublin	65,000
31 July 1993	Benfica	H	0–1		21,859
3 August 1993	Celtic	H	1–0	Kanchelskis	31,727
10 August 1993	Brøndby	A	2–0	Bruce (pen.), Hughes	11,372
16 May 1994	Celtic	H	1–3	Dublin	42,709

== FA Charity Shield ==
Date	Opponents	H / A	Result F–A	Scorers	Attendance
7 August 1993	Arsenal	N	1–1 (5–4p)	Hughes 8'	66,519

== FA Premier League ==
Date	Opponents	H / A	Result F–A	Scorers	Attendance	League position
15 August 1993	Norwich City	A	2–0	Giggs 26', Robson 58'	19,705	5th
18 August 1993	Sheffield United	H	3–0	Keane (2) 16', 43', Hughes 85'	41,949	1st
21 August 1993	Newcastle United	H	1–1	Giggs 40'	41,829	3rd
23 August 1993	Aston Villa	A	2–1	Sharpe (2) 17', 74'	39,624	1st
28 August 1993	Southampton	A	3–1	Sharpe 5', Cantona 16', Irwin 49',	16,189	1st
1 September 1993	West Ham United	H	3–0	Sharpe 7', Cantona 44' (pen.), Bruce 88'	44,613	1st
11 September 1993	Chelsea	A	0–1		37,064	1st
19 September 1993	Arsenal	H	1–0	Cantona 37'	44,009	1st
25 September 1993	Swindon Town	H	4–2	Kanchelskis 4', Cantona 40', Hughes (2) 51', 90'	44,583	1st
2 October 1993	Sheffield Wednesday	A	3–2	Hughes (2) 50', 67', Giggs 70'	34,548	1st
16 October 1993	Tottenham Hotspur	H	2–1	Keane 65', Sharpe 69'	44,655	1st
23 October 1993	Everton	A	1–0	Sharpe 53'	35,430	1st
30 October 1993	Queens Park Rangers	H	2–1	Cantona 53', Hughes 57'	44,663	1st
7 November 1993	Manchester City	A	3–2	Cantona (2) 52', 78', Keane 87'	35,155	1st
20 November 1993	Wimbledon	H	3–1	Pallister 53', Hughes 65', Kanchelskis 80'	44,748	1st
24 November 1993	Ipswich Town	H	0–0		43,300	1st
27 November 1993	Coventry City	A	1–0	Cantona 60'	17,020	1st
4 December 1993	Norwich City	H	2–2	Giggs 30', McClair 42'	44,694	1st
7 December 1993	Sheffield United	A	3–0	Hughes 13', Sharpe 27', Cantona 60'	26,746	1st
11 December 1993	Newcastle United	A	1–1	Ince 60'	36,388	1st
19 December 1993	Aston Villa	H	3–1	Cantona (2) 21', 89', Ince 90'	44,499	1st
26 December 1993	Blackburn Rovers	H	1–1	Ince 88'	44,511	1st
29 December 1993	Oldham Athletic	A	5–2	Kanchelskis 4', Cantona 19' (pen.), Bruce 39', Giggs (2) 53', 59'	16,708	1st
1 January 1994	Leeds United	H	0–0		44,724	1st
4 January 1994	Liverpool	A	3–3	Bruce 9', Giggs 20', Irwin 24'	42,795	1st
15 January 1994	Tottenham Hotspur	A	1–0	Hughes 49'	31,343	1st
22 January 1994	Everton	H	1–0	Giggs 27'	44,750	1st
5 February 1994	Queens Park Rangers	A	3–2	Kanchelskis 19', Cantona 45', Giggs 59'	21,267	1st
26 February 1994	West Ham United	A	2–2	Hughes 6', Ince 87'	28,832	1st
5 March 1994	Chelsea	H	0–1		44,745	1st
16 March 1994	Sheffield Wednesday	H	5–0	Giggs 14', Hughes 15', Ince 21', Cantona (2) 45', 55'	43,669	1st
19 March 1994	Swindon Town	A	2–2	Keane 13', Ince 62',	18,102	1st
22 March 1994	Arsenal	A	2–2	Sharpe (2) 10' 53'	36,203	1st
30 March 1994	Liverpool	H	1–0	Ince 36'	44,751	1st
2 April 1994	Blackburn Rovers	A	0–2		20,886	1st
4 April 1994	Oldham Athletic	H	3–2	Giggs 11', Dublin 66', Ince 67'	44,686	1st
16 April 1994	Wimbledon	A	0–1		28,553	1st
23 April 1994	Manchester City	H	2–0	Cantona (2) 40', 45'	44,333	1st
27 April 1994	Leeds United	A	2–0	Kanchelskis 47', Giggs 85'	41,125	1st
1 May 1994	Ipswich Town	A	2–1	Cantona 36', Giggs 47'	22,559	1st
4 May 1994	Southampton	H	2–0	Kanchelskis 60', Hughes 89'	44,705	1st
8 May 1994	Coventry City	H	0–0		44,717	1st

Pos	Team	Pld	W	D	L	GF	GA	GD	Pts	Qualification or relegation
1	Manchester United (C)	42	27	11	4	80	38	+42	92	Qualification for the Champions League group stage
2	Blackburn Rovers	42	25	9	8	63	36	+27	84	Qualification for the UEFA Cup first round
3	Newcastle United	42	23	8	11	82	41	+41	77	Qualification for the UEFA Cup first round
4	Arsenal	42	18	17	7	53	28	+25	71	Qualification for the Cup Winners' Cup first round (Note: Arsenal qualified for the Cup Winners' Cup as the defending champions.)
5	Leeds United	42	18	16	8	65	39	+26	70	

Source: Premier League
Rules for classification: 1) points; 2) goal difference; 3) number of goals scored.
(C) Champions

== FA Cup ==
Date	Round	Opponents	H / A	Result F–A	Scorers	Attendance
9 January 1994	Round 3	Sheffield United	A	1–0	Hughes 61'	22,019
30 January 1994	Round 4	Norwich City	A	2–0	Keane 18', Cantona 73'	21,060
20 February 1994	Round 5	Wimbledon	A	3–0	Cantona 42', Ince 63', Irwin 71'	27,511
12 March 1994	Round 6	Charlton Athletic	H	3–1	Hughes 46', Kanchelskis (2) 71', 75'	44,347
10 April 1994	Semi-final	Oldham Athletic	N	1–1	Hughes 119'	56,399
13 April 1994	Semi-final Replay	Oldham Athletic	N	4–1	Irwin 9', Kanchelskis 15', Robson 62', Giggs 68'	32,311
14 May 1994	Final	Chelsea	N	4–0	Cantona (2) 60' (pen.), 66' (pen.), Hughes 68', McClair 90'	79,634

== League Cup ==
Date	Round	Opponents	H / A	Result F–A	Scorers	Attendance
22 September 1993	Round 2 First leg	Stoke City	A	1–2	Dublin 72'	23,327
6 October 1993	Round 2 Second leg	Stoke City	H	2–0	Sharpe 46', McClair 88'	41,387
27 October 1993	Round 3	Leicester City	H	5–1	Bruce (2) 7', 86', McClair 14', Sharpe 53', Hughes 62'	41,344
30 November 1993	Round 4	Everton	A	2–0	Hughes 13', Giggs 46'	34,052
12 January 1994	Round 5	Portsmouth	H	2–2	Giggs 29', Cantona 60'	43,794
26 January 1994	Round 5 replay	Portsmouth	A	1–0	McClair 27'	24,950
13 February 1994	Semi-final; First leg	Sheffield Wednesday	H	1–0	Giggs 19'	43,294
2 March 1994	Semi-final; Second leg	Sheffield Wednesday	A	4–1	McClair 4', Kanchelskis 10', Hughes (2) 38', 82'	43,794
27 March 1994	Final	Aston Villa	N	1–3	Hughes 82'	77,231

== UEFA Champions League ==
Date	Round	Opponents	H / A	Result F–A	Scorers	Attendance
15 September 1993	First round First leg	Kispest Honvéd	A	3–2	Keane (2) 9', 42', Cantona 44'	9,000
29 September 1993	First round Second leg	Kispest Honvéd	H	2–1	Bruce (2) 55', 64'	35,781
20 October 1993	Second round First leg	Galatasaray	H	3–3	Robson 3', Şükür 13' (o.g.), Cantona 81'	39,346
3 November 1993	Second round Second leg	Galatasaray	A	0–0		40,000

== Squad statistics ==
No.	Pos.	Name	League		FA Cup		League Cup		European Cup		Other		Total	
No.	Pos.	Name	Apps	Goals	Apps	Goals	Apps	Goals	Apps	Goals	Apps	Goals	Apps	Goals
1	GK	(Denmark) Peter Schmeichel	40	0	7	0	8	0	4	0	1	0	60	0
2	DF	(England) Paul Parker	39(1)	0	7	0	6	0	3	0	1	0	55(1)	0
3	DF	(Republic of Ireland) Denis Irwin	42	2	7	2	8(1)	0	3	0	1	0	61(1)	4
4	DF	(England) Steve Bruce	41	3	7	0	8(1)	2	4	2	1	0	61(1)	7
5	MF	(England) Lee Sharpe	26(4)	9	1(2)	0	2(2)	2	4	0	0	0	33(8)	11
6	DF	(England) Gary Pallister	41	1	7	0	9	0	3	0	1	0	60	1
7	FW	(France) Eric Cantona	34	18	5	4	5	1	4	2	1	0	48	25
8	MF	(England) Paul Ince	39	8	7	1	5	0	4	0	1	0	55	9
9	FW	(Scotland) Brian McClair	12(14)	1	1(4)	1	6(1)	4	0	0	0	0	19(19)	6
10	FW	(Wales) Mark Hughes	36	12	7	4	8	5	2	0	1	1	54	22
11	MF	(Wales) Ryan Giggs	32(6)	13	7	1	6(2)	3	4	0	1	0	50(8)	17
12	MF	(England) Bryan Robson	10(5)	1	1(1)	1	5	0	4	1	0(1)	0	20(7)	3
13	GK	(England) Les Sealey	0	0	0(1)	0	1	0	0	0	0	0	1(1)	0
14	MF	(Russia) Andrei Kanchelskis	28(3)	6	6	3	9	1	0	0	1	0	44(3)	10
15	DF	(Wales) Clayton Blackmore	0	0	0	0	0	0	0	0	0	0	0	0
16	MF	(Republic of Ireland) Roy Keane	34(3)	5	6	1	6(1)	0	3	2	1	0	49(4)	8
17	MF	(Scotland) Colin McKee	1	0	0	0	0	0	0	0	0	0	1	0
18	MF	(Scotland) Darren Ferguson	1(2)	0	0	0	1(1)	0	0	0	0	0	2(3)	0
19	MF	(England) Nicky Butt	0(1)	0	0(1)	0	0	0	0	0	0	0	0(2)	0
20	FW	(England) Dion Dublin	1(4)	1	1(1)	0	1(1)	1	0(1)	0	0	0	3(7)	2
21	DF	(England) Lee Martin	1	0	0	0	3	0	1(1)	0	0	0	5(1)	0
22	MF	(Wales) Craig Lawton	0	0	0	0	0	0	0	0	0	0	0	0
23	MF	(England) Mike Phelan	1(1)	0	0	0	2	0	1(3)	0	0	0	4(4)	0
24	MF	(England) Paul Scholes	0	0	0	0	0	0	0	0	0	0	0	0
25	GK	(England) Gary Walsh	2(1)	0	0	0	0	0	0	0	0	0	2(1)	0
26	DF	(England) Chris Casper	0	0	0	0	0	0	0	0	0	0	0	0
27	DF	(England) Gary Neville	1	0	0	0	0	0	0(1)	0	0	0	1(1)	0
28	MF	(England) David Beckham	0	0	0	0	0	0	0	0	0	0	0	0
29	MF	(England) Ben Thornley	0(1)	0	0	0	0	0	0	0	0	0	0(1)	0
30	DF	(England) John O'Kane	0	0	0	0	0	0	0	0	0	0	0	0
31	MF	(Northern Ireland) Keith Gillespie	0	0	0	0	0	0	0	0	0	0	0	0
32	DF	(England) Neil Whitworth	0	0	0	0	0	0	0	0	0	0	0	0

== Transfers ==
=== In ===
Date	Pos.	Name	From	Fee
19 July 1993	MF	(Republic of Ireland) Roy Keane	(England) Nottingham Forest	£3.75m

=== Out ===
Date	Pos.	Name	To	Fee
November 1993	DF	(Republic of Ireland) Brian Carey	(England) Leicester City	£250k
13 January 1994	MF	(Scotland) Darren Ferguson	(England) Wolverhampton Wanderers	£320k
19 January 1994	DF	(England) Lee Martin	(Scotland) Celtic	Free
18 May 1994	MF	(England) Bryan Robson	(England) Middlesbrough	Free

=== Loan out ===
Date From	Date To	Position	Name	To
3 October 1993	4 November 1993	MF	(Northern Ireland) Keith Gillespie	(England) Wigan Athletic
8 October 1993	8 December 1993	DF	(England) Neil Whitworth	(England) Rotherham United
19 November 1993	12 December 1993	GK	(England) Gary Walsh	(England) Oldham Athletic
10 December 1993	10 January 1994	DF	(England) Neil Whitworth	(England) Blackpool
17 December 1993	17 January 1994	MF	(Wales) Simon Davies	(England) Exeter City
