= 1994–95 Manchester United F.C. season =

English football club season

Manchester United
1994–95 season
- Chairman: Martin Edwards
- Manager: Alex Ferguson
- FA Premier League: 2nd
- FA Cup: Runners-up
- League Cup: Third round
- UEFA Champions League: Group stage
- Charity Shield: Winners
- Top goalscorer: League: Andrei Kanchelskis (14); All: Andrei Kanchelskis (15)
- Highest home attendance: 43,868 vs Sheffield Wednesday (7 May 1995)
- Lowest home attendance: 31,615 vs Port Vale (5 October 1994)
- Average home league attendance: 43,682
| Home colours | Away colours | Third colours |

The 1994–95 season was Manchester United's third season in the Premier League, and their 20th consecutive season in the top division of English football.

United acquired David May from Blackburn Rovers early on in the season. They then bought Andy Cole from Newcastle United in January for a British record fee of £7 million (£6 million cash with £1 million-rated Keith Gillespie in part-exchange). That month, Eric Cantona was involved in an incident away to Crystal Palace. As a result of abuse received from a fan, Cantona broke free of kitman Norman Davies' grasp as he was escorting him from the pitch after being sent off, and launched a kung-fu style kick at the fan. Cantona was banned from football for eight months and fined £20,000 by his club and a further £10,000 by the Football Association.

United lost the Premier League title on the last day when, despite Blackburn Rovers losing to Liverpool, United could only manage a draw away to West Ham United. The misery continued when Manchester United went on to lose to Everton in the 1995 FA Cup final.

After the season was over, United sold Paul Ince to Internazionale and Mark Hughes to Chelsea, while Andrei Kanchelskis was placed on the transfer list, eventually agreeing a deal with Everton.

== Events of the season ==
=== Pre-season ===
United's only major signing of the close season was David May, the 24-year-old Blackburn Rovers defender signed for a fee of £1.4 million with a view to becoming an eventual successor to the ageing Steve Bruce in the centre of defence, as well as being capable of playing at right-back. Alex Ferguson also added to the reserve ranks with a £100,000 move to 18-year-old Bradford City striker Graeme Tomlinson.

"Captain Marvel" Bryan Robson had left at the end of the 1993–94 season after 13 years at United to become player-manager of Middlesbrough. Clayton Blackmore, another of United's longest-serving players, also called time on more than a decade at Old Trafford, having missed the whole 1993–94 season through injuries, to join Robson on Teesside.

Goalkeeper Les Sealey was given a free transfer, having kept goal for United in two 18-month spells since December 1989, as was fellow veteran Mike Phelan, who had given five years of service in midfield. Just after the start of the season, defender Neil Whitworth and striker Colin McKee also headed out of the Old Trafford exit door, signing for Kilmarnock in the Scottish Premier Division.

=== August ===
United's season began on 14 August 1994 at Wembley Stadium, where they took on Blackburn Rovers in the FA Charity Shield. They won 2–0 with a penalty from Eric Cantona and another goal from Paul Ince. Their league campaign began six days later at Old Trafford, where they took on Queen's Park Rangers and triumphed 2–0. A 1–1 draw at newly promoted Nottingham Forest followed, before a 1–0 win at Tottenham Hotspur and finally a 3–0 home win over Wimbledon, which saw United end the month in second place after four games with only Newcastle United ahead of them.

=== September ===
September saw United's league challenge continue, and they also began their challenges in the League Cup and the Champions League. On 11 September, they fell to their first defeat of the season, losing 2–1 to Leeds United. They also lost their next away game, a shock 3–2 loss at a struggling Ipswich Town side. On the scoresheet for United in that game was 19-year-old striker Paul Scholes, who had found the net twice three days earlier on his competitive debut in the League Cup second round first leg at Vale Park, where they beat Port Vale 2–1. Their Champions League quest started on a high note as they beat IFK Gothenburg of Sweden 4–2 at Old Trafford in their first group game, though they were held to a goalless draw in Istanbul by Galatasaray (who had knocked them out in the second knockout round the previous season) in the next European clash.

=== October ===
October was another mixed month for United, who began with a 2–0 home win over a crumbling Everton side, before being beaten 1–0 at Sheffield Wednesday in their next game. They then achieved a 1–0 home win over West Ham United, followed four days later by a 2–2 home draw with Spanish giants FC Barcelona in the third Champions League group match at Old Trafford. They then travelled to Ewood Park for a league clash with fellow title chasers Blackburn Rovers, winning the game 4–2 with two goals from influential winger Andrei Kanchelskis, to move ahead of Kenny Dalglish's side in the title race, but still leaving themselves seven points behind leaders Newcastle United and five points adrift of second placed Nottingham Forest.

They were then eliminated from the League Cup by a 2–0 third round defeat at Newcastle United, but gained their revenge on the Tynesiders in the league three days later with a 2–0 win at Old Trafford, meaning that they had cut Newcastle's lead further by the end of the month.

=== November ===
November brought more erratic performances for United. The month began with a 4–0 demolition at Barcelona in the Champions League. They did bounce back in the league four days later with a 2–1 win at Aston Villa just days before the dismissal of former United manager Ron Atkinson as the Villa manager. Then came a superb 5–0 home win over Manchester City in the Manchester derby at Old Trafford, in which Andrei Kanchelskis scored a hat-trick, to cut Newcastle's lead of the Premier League to a mere two points. They also achieved a 3–0 home win over struggling Crystal Palace in the next game, which was overshadowed by a back injury to goalkeeper Peter Schmeichel, ruling him out of action for the next 10 league games, during which his place between the sticks was taken by Gary Walsh with the young Kevin Pilkington on standby.

United suffered perhaps their most humiliating defeat of the whole season on 23 November, when they travelled to Gothenburg for the fifth of their sixth Champions League games and came away on the receiving end of a 3–1 defeat, in which Paul Ince was sent off. The result left them needing a miracle to reach the quarter-finals; progression only being possible if Gothenburg managed to beat Barcelona in their final group game as well as United beating Galatasaray at Old Trafford in theirs.

The month ended in a goalless draw with Arsenal at Highbury, in which Mark Hughes was sent off and Paul Ince was stretchered off after injuring his ankle blocking a shot from Arsenal's John Jensen.

=== December ===
A 4–0 home win over Galatasary, with first goals from young midfielders David Beckham and Simon Davies, was not enough to prevent them from bowing out of the Champions League at the group stage, but at least it freed them up to concentrate on their domestic season.

December brought some more strong performances from United on the league scene, as they defeated Norwich City, Queen's Park Rangers and Chelsea. However, they suffered their first home defeat in nine months on 17 December when they lost 2–1 at home to Nottingham Forest – when a victory would have sent them to the top of the table. They blew another chance to go top on 28 December when they were held to a 1–1 draw at home by second-from-bottom Leicester City. They finished the year with a 2–2 draw at Southampton, in which 19-year-old midfielder Nicky Butt scored his first senior goal.

=== January ===
1995 began with a 2–0 home win over Coventry City, followed six days later by the beginning of their FA Cup quest, which began at Bramall Lane where they beat Sheffield United 2–0 in the third round.

After a failed bid to sign Nottingham Forest's Stan Collymore, United broke the national transfer record on 10 January 1995 in a £7 million deal to sign 23-year-old striker Andy Cole from Newcastle United. Cole, who was the Premier League's top scorer in 1993–94 with 34 goals and had already managed nine in 1994–95, cost United £6 million in cash, with £1 million-rated winger Keith Gillespie moving in the opposite direction. Five days later, the two sides met at St James' Park in the league, but neither player turned out for their new side in the game which ended in a 1–1 draw. United had gone ahead with an early goal from Mark Hughes, who suffered a knee injury in the process and was ruled out until the following month, before Newcastle equalised with a goal from Paul Kitson – the man taking Cole's place in the Newcastle attack.

On 22 January, United hosted Blackburn Rovers – still top of the table – at Old Trafford in the league. An Eric Cantona goal won them the game 1–0 to cut Blackburn's lead to two points.

25 January 1995 saw one of the most controversial events in the history of Manchester United football club. In the 48th minute of a 1–1 league draw with struggling Crystal Palace at Selhurst Park, Eric Cantona was sent off for kicking out at Palace defender Richard Shaw, and then faced verbal abuse from the Palace fans. He reacted to the taunts of one Palace fan, 21-year-old Matthew Simmons, by launching a kung-fu kick at him and trading blows with his hands. Within 48 hours, the club had fined Cantona £20,000 and suspended him from the first team for the rest of the season. The Football Association soon extended the ban to eight months (up to and including 30 September 1995) and fined him a further £10,000. Cantona later admitted common assault at Croydon Magistrates' Court and received a 14-day prison sentence, though he was bailed pending an appeal against it. On appeal, this was reduced to a 120-hour community service order.

Three days after the Cantona incident, United kept their FA Cup quest going with a 5–2 home win over Wrexham in the fourth round.

=== February ===
Andy Cole's first United goal came on 4 February 1995, the only goal in a 1–0 home win over Aston Villa in the league. At this stage, United were two points behind Blackburn, and the title race was now looking like a two-horse race with United nine points ahead of third placed Newcastle United. The second Manchester derby of the season, at Maine Road, was United's next game, which they won comfortably by a 3–0 scoreline to take a brief lead at the top of the table. Then they defeated Leeds United 3–1 in the FA Cup fifth round, before winning 2–0 at Carrow Road against a Norwich City side who had chased them for the title two seasons earlier but were now sinking down the league table after early promise for the second season in a row. However, the month ended on a sour note with a 1–0 defeat at Everton – United's first since their 2–1 defeat at home to Nottingham Forest before Christmas. A landslide victory in that game would have put United top on goal difference.

=== March ===
4 March 1995 saw United set two notable new records in the Premier League. Their 9–0 home win over Ipswich Town was the biggest victory margin and saw them score the highest number of goals in any game in the league's three-season history. Andy Cole's five goals were the most scored by any player in a Premier League game. The result meant that United were still three points behind leaders Blackburn, but had a greater goal difference. They did briefly regain the lead of the league three days later with a Steve Bruce goal giving them a 1–0 win at Wimbledon, There was more success in their next game as they beat Queen's Park Rangers (player-managed by former United midfielder Ray Wilkins) 2–0 in the FA Cup quarter final at Old Trafford. Then came a goalless draw at home to Tottenham Hotspur in the league – the first time United had failed to score at Old Trafford in the league all season. Their title hopes were hit by an even bigger blow four days later when they were beaten 2–0 by Liverpool at Anfield – their first defeat to Liverpool for three years. They were now six points behind leaders Blackburn. The next game saw United keep their title hopes alive with a comfortable 3–0 home win over Arsenal.

=== April ===
April began with more disappointment for the Reds, who were held to a goalless draw at home by Leeds United. With six games left to play, they were now five points behind leaders Blackburn, who had a game in hand.

United's opponents in the FA Cup semi final were Crystal Palace, who held them to a 2–2 draw in extra time at Villa Park. With bad blood between fans of the two clubs still boiling over the Cantona incident more than two months earlier, a more serious cloud hung over the replay (also at Villa Park) as a Palace fan had been killed in fighting between fans of the two clubs outside a Walsall public house just before the game. During the first half, Roy Keane suffered ankle injury due to a rash tackle by Palace's Darren Pitcher, and resisted Ferguson's offer to substitute him at half time, when he needed stitches. Just into the second half, Keane's injury was aggravated by another Palace tackle, this time from Gareth Southgate. He reacted by stamping on Southgate and earned himself a red card. Keane was then attacked by Palace's Darren Patterson, who was also sent off. It seemed likely that Keane would miss the rest of the season and the FA Cup final (which United reached by winning the semi-final replay 2–0) but ultimately he was back in action for the final, having already served his three-match ban for bringing the game into disrepute.

After the drama of the FA Cup semi final, United resumed league action and travelled to Filbert Street where they took on an already relegated Leicester side who had held them to a 1–1 draw at Old Trafford less than four months earlier. They won this game 4–0 to remain in contention for the title, though they were still six points behind Blackburn with five games remaining. However, they were held to a 0–0 draw at Old Trafford by Chelsea two days later, though due to Blackburn losing their game they were now just five points behind the leaders. But time was running out, with both sides just having four games to go.

=== May ===
After a two-week break, United returned to action on 1 May, when they faced Coventry City at Highfield Road. The midlanders were now managed by former United manager Ron Atkinson. They won 3–2 to ensure that the home side's survival remained far from certain, but more importantly they ensured that their challenge for the title remained very much alive. Blackburn had slipped up in their last two games, meaning that United had cut their lead to five points – and had a game in hand. In the next game six days later, David May scored the only goal of a 1–0 home win over Sheffield Wednesday to cut United's deficit behind his old club to two points with two games to go. This meant that a victory over Southampton at Old Trafford on 10 May would keep United in the title race right up to the very last game. United went down 1–0 in the fifth minute as the Saints scored through Simon Charlton, only for Andy Cole to equalise in the 21st minute. However, United were still being held to a 1–1 score well into the second half, and the championship celebrations were just minutes away from beginning in Blackburn. Then came an 80th-minute goal by Denis Irwin which won the game 2–1 for United and kept their title bid alive. The last game of the season, on 14 May, saw United travel to Upton Park for a clash with a West Ham United side who had just secured their safety. Blackburn, in contrast, had to travel to Anfield for a clash with Kenny Dalglish's old club Liverpool; their game undoubtedly appeared much harder on paper as Liverpool had finished fourth in the league and won the League Cup. However, the Hammers shocked United by going ahead in the 31st minute through Michael Hughes. Brian McClair did equalise in the 52nd minute, and as the game wore on United fought against the clock to score a winner, but West Ham remained resilient and after two late blunders by Andy Cole, the game ended 1–1 and United lost the title, which went to Blackburn in spite of their 2–1 defeat at Liverpool.

The FA Cup final on 20 May 1995 saw United beaten 1–0 by Everton at Wembley, with Paul Rideout scoring the only goal of the game, to leave them without a major trophy for the first time in six years.

=== Close season ===
The end of the 1994–95 season saw the demolition of the 30-year-old North Stand at Old Trafford, to make way for a new 26,800-seat stand costing nearly £30 million, which would be fully operational within a year and increase Old Trafford's capacity to more than 57,000.

A month after the season ended, two of the club's key players were sold. The first was Paul Ince, who agreed to sign for Italian side Internazionale for a fee of £7.5 million. Within 24 hours of Ince's transfer, striker Mark Hughes was sold to Chelsea for £1.5 million, much to the dismay of many of the club's fans. Ince had been linked with the Italian giants for some time, but Hughes's departure came as something of a surprise, despite the arrival of Andy Cole in January and the knowledge that Eric Cantona had signed a new three-year contract with the club three months into his eight-month suspension. Soon after, the club announced that a transfer request from top scorer Andrei Kanchelskis had been accepted. After interest from Liverpool and Bryan Robson's Middlesbrough, Kanchelskis agreed to sign for Everton in a £5 million deal, although complications over the contract meant that the transfer was not completed until a few days into the 1995–96 season.

On 6 August, Eric Cantona headed back to France and informed Manchester United of his intention to quit English football, frustrated at the terms of his ban, and fearing that he would be faced with fresh disciplinary action after United had been censured by the FA for fielding Cantona in what they chose to define as a friendly match. However, he quickly went back on his decision and was soon back at Old Trafford, training with his colleagues and looking forward to his return to action.

As the first game of the 1995–96 season loomed, United had still yet to make a major signing.

== Pre-season and friendlies ==
| Date | Opponents | H / A | Result F–A | Scorers | Attendance |
|---|---|---|---|---|---|
| 30 July 1994 | Dundalk | A | 4–2 | Hughes (2), Giggs, Ince | 4,500 |
| 1 August 1994 | Shelbourne | A | 3–0 | Cantona, Ince, McClair | 12,500 |
| 3 August 1994 | Wolverhampton Wanderers | A | 2–1 | Ince, Blades (o.g.) | 28,500 |
| 5 August 1994 | Newcastle United | N | 1–1 (5–6p) | Cantona | 27,282 |
| 6 August 1994 | Rangers | A | 0–1 | | 30,186 |
| 9 August 1994 | Cambridge United | A | 1–1 | Sharpe | 9,194 |
| 16 August 1994 | Middlesbrough | A | 3–0 | Hughes (2), Sharpe | 19,658 |

== FA Charity Shield ==
| Date | Opponents | H / A | Result F–A | Scorers | Attendance |
|---|---|---|---|---|---|
| 14 August 1994 | Blackburn Rovers | N | 2–0 | Cantona 22' (pen.), Ince 81' | 60,402 |

== FA Premier League ==
| Date | Opponents | H / A | Result F–A | Scorers | Attendance | League position |
|---|---|---|---|---|---|---|
| 20 August 1994 | Queens Park Rangers | H | 2–0 | Hughes 48', McClair 69' | 43,214 | 3rd |
| 22 August 1994 | Nottingham Forest | A | 1–1 | Kanchelskis 23' | 22,072 | 1st |
| 27 August 1994 | Tottenham Hotspur | A | 1–0 | Bruce 49' | 24,502 | 3rd |
| 31 August 1994 | Wimbledon | H | 3–0 | Cantona 40', McClair 81', Giggs 84' | 43,440 | 2nd |
| 11 September 1994 | Leeds United | A | 1–2 | Cantona 72' (pen.) | 39,396 | 5th |
| 17 September 1994 | Liverpool | H | 2–0 | Kanchelskis 73', McClair 74' | 43,740 | 3rd |
| 24 September 1994 | Ipswich Town | A | 2–3 | Cantona 71', Scholes 74' | 22,559 | 4th |
| 1 October 1994 | Everton | H | 2–0 | Kanchelskis 41', Sharpe 88' | 43,803 | 4th |
| 8 October 1994 | Sheffield Wednesday | A | 0–1 | | 33,441 | 5th |
| 15 October 1994 | West Ham United | H | 1–0 | Cantona 44' | 43,795 | 4th |
| 23 October 1994 | Blackburn Rovers | A | 4–2 | Cantona 45' (pen.), Kanchelskis (2) 52', 82', Hughes 67' | 30,260 | 3rd |
| 29 October 1994 | Newcastle United | H | 2–0 | Pallister 11', Gillespie 77' | 43,795 | 3rd |
| 6 November 1994 | Aston Villa | A | 2–1 | Ince 41', Kanchelskis 51' | 32,136 | 3rd |
| 10 November 1994 | Manchester City | H | 5–0 | Cantona 24', Kanchelskis (3) 43', 47', 89', Hughes 70' | 43,738 | 2nd |
| 19 November 1994 | Crystal Palace | H | 3–0 | Irwin 8', Cantona 34', Kanchelskis 51' | 43,788 | 1st |
| 26 November 1994 | Arsenal | A | 0–0 | | 38,301 | 2nd |
| 3 December 1994 | Norwich City | H | 1–0 | Cantona 36' | 43,789 | 2nd |
| 10 December 1994 | Queens Park Rangers | A | 3–2 | Scholes (2) 34', 48', Keane 45' | 18,948 | 2nd |
| 17 December 1994 | Nottingham Forest | H | 1–2 | Cantona 68' | 43,744 | 2nd |
| 26 December 1994 | Chelsea | A | 3–2 | Hughes 22', Cantona 46' (pen.), McClair 79' | 31,161 | 2nd |
| 28 December 1994 | Leicester City | H | 1–1 | Kanchelskis 61' | 43,789 | 2nd |
| 31 December 1994 | Southampton | A | 2–2 | Butt 51', Pallister 79' | 16,708 | 2nd |
| 3 January 1995 | Coventry City | H | 2–0 | Scholes 30', Cantona 50' (pen.) | 43,130 | 2nd |
| 15 January 1995 | Newcastle United | A | 1–1 | Hughes 13' | 34,471 | 2nd |
| 22 January 1995 | Blackburn Rovers | H | 1–0 | Cantona 80' | 43,742 | 2nd |
| 25 January 1995 | Crystal Palace | A | 1–1 | May 57' | 18,224 | 2nd |
| 4 February 1995 | Aston Villa | H | 1–0 | Cole 18' | 43,795 | 2nd |
| 11 February 1995 | Manchester City | A | 3–0 | Ince 58', Kanchelskis 74', Cole 78' | 26,368 | 1st |
| 22 February 1995 | Norwich City | A | 2–0 | Ince 3', Kanchelskis 17' | 21,824 | 2nd |
| 25 February 1995 | Everton | A | 0–1 | | 40,011 | 2nd |
| 4 March 1995 | Ipswich Town | H | 9–0 | Keane 16', Cole (5) 24', 37', 53', 65', 89', Hughes (2) 54', 59', Ince 73' | 43,804 | 2nd |
| 7 March 1995 | Wimbledon | A | 1–0 | Bruce 84' | 18,224 | 1st |
| 15 March 1995 | Tottenham Hotspur | H | 0–0 | | 43,802 | 2nd |
| 19 March 1995 | Liverpool | A | 0–2 | | 38,906 | 2nd |
| 22 March 1995 | Arsenal | H | 3–0 | Hughes 27', Sharpe 32', Kanchelskis 80', | 43,623 | 2nd |
| 2 April 1995 | Leeds United | H | 0–0 | | 43,712 | 2nd |
| 15 April 1995 | Leicester City | A | 4–0 | Sharpe 34', Cole (2) 45', 53', Ince 90' | 21,281 | 2nd |
| 17 April 1995 | Chelsea | H | 0–0 | | 43,728 | 2nd |
| 1 May 1995 | Coventry City | A | 3–2 | Scholes 33', Cole (2) 56', 79' | 21,885 | 2nd |
| 7 May 1995 | Sheffield Wednesday | H | 1–0 | May 6' | 43,868 | 2nd |
| 10 May 1995 | Southampton | H | 2–1 | Cole 22', Irwin 81' (pen.) | 43,479 | 2nd |
| 14 May 1995 | West Ham United | A | 1–1 | McClair 53' | 24,783 | 2nd |

| Pos | Team | Pld | W | D | L | GF | GA | GD | Pts | Qualification or relegation |
|---|---|---|---|---|---|---|---|---|---|---|
| 1 | Blackburn Rovers (C) | 42 | 27 | 8 | 7 | 80 | 39 | +41 | 89 | Qualification for the Champions League group stage |
| 2 | Manchester United | 42 | 26 | 10 | 6 | 77 | 28 | +49 | 88 | Qualification for the UEFA Cup first round (Note: Leeds United were rewarded entry to the UEFA Cup through UEFA Fair Play ranking.) |
| 3 | Nottingham Forest | 42 | 22 | 11 | 9 | 72 | 43 | +29 | 77 | Qualification for the UEFA Cup first round |
| 4 | Liverpool | 42 | 21 | 11 | 10 | 65 | 37 | +28 | 74 | Qualification for the UEFA Cup first round |
| 5 | Leeds United | 42 | 20 | 13 | 9 | 59 | 38 | +21 | 73 | Qualification for the UEFA Cup first round |

Source: Premier League
Rules for classification: 1) points; 2) goal difference; 3) number of goals scored.
(C) Champions

== FA Cup ==
| Date | Round | Opponents | H / A | Result F–A | Scorers | Attendance |
|---|---|---|---|---|---|---|
| 9 January 1995 | Round 3 | Sheffield United | A | 2–0 | Hughes 80', Cantona 82' | 22,322 |
| 28 January 1995 | Round 4 | Wrexham | H | 5–2 | Irwin (2) 17', 74' (pen.), Giggs 27', McClair 67', Humes 81' (o.g.) | 43,222 |
| 19 February 1995 | Round 5 | Leeds United | H | 3–1 | Bruce 2', McClair 5', Hughes 72' | 42,744 |
| 12 March 1995 | Round 6 | Queens Park Rangers | H | 2–0 | Sharpe 23', Irwin 53' | 42,830 |
| 9 April 1995 | Semi-final | Crystal Palace | N | 2–2 (a.e.t.) | Irwin 70', Pallister 97' | 38,256 |
| 12 April 1995 | Semi-final; Replay | Crystal Palace | N | 2–0 | Bruce 30', Pallister 41' | 17,987 |
| 20 May 1995 | Final | Everton | N | 0–1 | | 79,592 |

== League Cup ==
| Date | Round | Opponents | H / A | Result F–A | Scorers | Attendance |
|---|---|---|---|---|---|---|
| 21 September 1994 | Round 2 First leg | Port Vale | A | 2–1 | Scholes (2) 36', 53' | 18,605 |
| 5 October 1994 | Round 2 Second leg | Port Vale | H | 2–0 | McClair 35', May 61' | 31,615 |
| 26 October 1994 | Round 3 | Newcastle United | A | 0–2 | | 34,178 |

== UEFA Champions League ==
=== Group stage ===
| Date | Opponents | H / A | Result F–A | Scorers | Attendance |
|---|---|---|---|---|---|
| 14 September 1994 | IFK Göteborg | H | 4–2 | Giggs (2) 33', 66', Kanchelskis 48', Sharpe 71' | 33,625 |
| 28 September 1994 | Galatasaray | A | 0–0 | | 28,605 |
| 19 October 1994 | Barcelona | H | 2–2 | Hughes 20', Sharpe 80' | 40,064 |
| 2 November 1994 | Barcelona | A | 0–4 | | 114,273 |
| 23 November 1994 | IFK Göteborg | A | 1–3 | Hughes 64' | 36,350 |
| 7 December 1994 | Galatasaray | H | 4–0 | Davies 3', Beckham 38', Keane 49', Bülent (o.g.) 88' | 39,220 |

| Pos | Team | Pld | W | D | L | GF | GA | GD | Pts | Qualification |
|---|---|---|---|---|---|---|---|---|---|---|
| 1 | (Sweden) IFK Göteborg | 6 | 4 | 1 | 1 | 10 | 7 | +3 | 9 | Advance to knockout stage |
| 2 | (Spain) Barcelona | 6 | 2 | 2 | 2 | 11 | 8 | +3 | 6 | Advance to knockout stage |
| 3 | (England) Manchester United | 6 | 2 | 2 | 2 | 11 | 11 | 0 | 6 | |
| 4 | (Turkey) Galatasaray | 6 | 1 | 1 | 4 | 3 | 9 | −6 | 3 | |

Source: UEFA

== Squad statistics ==
| No. | Pos. | Name | League | | FA Cup | | League Cup | | Europe | | Other | | Total | |
| No. | Pos. | Name | Apps | Goals | Apps | Goals | Apps | Goals | Apps | Goals | Apps | Goals | Apps | Goals |
|---|---|---|---|---|---|---|---|---|---|---|---|---|---|---|
| 1 | GK | (Denmark) Peter Schmeichel | 32 | 0 | 7 | 0 | 0 | 0 | 3 | 0 | 1 | 0 | 43 | 0 |
| 2 | DF | (England) Paul Parker | 1(1) | 0 | 0 | 0 | 0 | 0 | 2(1) | 0 | 0 | 0 | 3(2) | 0 |
| 3 | DF | (Republic of Ireland) Denis Irwin | 40 | 2 | 7 | 4 | 2 | 0 | 5 | 0 | 0 | 0 | 54 | 6 |
| 4 | DF | (England) Steve Bruce | 35 | 2 | 5 | 2 | 1 | 0 | 5(1) | 0 | 1 | 0 | 47(1) | 4 |
| 5 | MF | (England) Lee Sharpe | 26(2) | 3 | 6(1) | 1 | 0(2) | 0 | 3 | 2 | 1 | 0 | 36(5) | 6 |
| 6 | DF | (England) Gary Pallister | 42 | 2 | 7 | 2 | 2 | 0 | 6 | 0 | 1 | 0 | 58 | 4 |
| 7 | FW | (France) Eric Cantona | 21 | 12 | 1 | 1 | 0 | 0 | 2 | 0 | 1 | 1 | 25 | 14 |
| 8 | MF | (England) Paul Ince | 36 | 5 | 6 | 0 | 0 | 0 | 5 | 0 | 1 | 1 | 48 | 6 |
| 9 | FW | (Scotland) Brian McClair | 35(5) | 5 | 6(1) | 2 | 3 | 1 | 2 | 0 | 1 | 0 | 47(6) | 8 |
| 10 | FW | (Wales) Mark Hughes | 33(1) | 8 | 6 | 2 | 0 | 0 | 5 | 2 | 1 | 0 | 45(1) | 12 |
| 11 | MF | (Wales) Ryan Giggs | 29 | 1 | 6(1) | 1 | 0 | 0 | 3 | 2 | 1 | 0 | 39(1) | 4 |
| 12 | DF | (England) David May | 15(4) | 2 | 1 | 0 | 2 | 1 | 4 | 0 | 1 | 0 | 23(4) | 3 |
| 13 | GK | (England) Gary Walsh | 10 | 0 | 0 | 0 | 3 | 0 | 3 | 0 | 0 | 0 | 16 | 0 |
| 14 | MF | (Russia) Andrei Kanchelskis | 25(5) | 14 | 2(1) | 0 | 0 | 0 | 5 | 1 | 1 | 0 | 33(6) | 15 |
| 15 | FW | (England) Graeme Tomlinson | 0 | 0 | 0 | 0 | 0(2) | 0 | 0 | 0 | 0 | 0 | 0(2) | 0 |
| 16 | MF | (Republic of Ireland) Roy Keane | 23(2) | 2 | 6(1) | 0 | 1 | 0 | 4 | 1 | 0 | 0 | 34(3) | 3 |
| 17 | FW | (England) Andy Cole | 17(1) | 12 | 0 | 0 | 0 | 0 | 0 | 0 | 0 | 0 | 17(1) | 12 |
| 18 | MF | (Wales) Simon Davies | 3(2) | 0 | 0 | 0 | 3 | 0 | 2 | 1 | 0 | 0 | 8(2) | 1 |
| 19 | MF | (England) Nicky Butt | 11(11) | 1 | 3(1) | 0 | 3 | 0 | 5(1) | 0 | 0 | 0 | 22(13) | 1 |
| 20 | MF | (England) Terry Cooke | 0 | 0 | 0 | 0 | 0 | 0 | 0 | 0 | 0 | 0 | 0 | 0 |
| 21 | DF | (Northern Ireland) Pat McGibbon | 0 | 0 | 0 | 0 | 0 | 0 | 0 | 0 | 0 | 0 | 0 | 0 |
| 23 | DF | (England) Phil Neville | 1(1) | 0 | 1 | 0 | 0 | 0 | 0 | 0 | 0 | 0 | 2(1) | 0 |
| 24 | MF | (England) Paul Scholes | 6(11) | 5 | 1(2) | 0 | 3 | 2 | 0(2) | 0 | 0 | 0 | 10(15) | 7 |
| 25 | GK | (England) Kevin Pilkington | 0(1) | 0 | 0 | 0 | 0 | 0 | 0 | 0 | 0 | 0 | 0(1) | 0 |
| 26 | DF | (England) Chris Casper | 0 | 0 | 0 | 0 | 1 | 0 | 0 | 0 | 0 | 0 | 1 | 0 |
| 27 | DF | (England) Gary Neville | 16(2) | 0 | 4 | 0 | 2(1) | 0 | 1(1) | 0 | 0 | 0 | 23(4) | 0 |
| 28 | MF | (England) David Beckham | 2(2) | 0 | 1(1) | 0 | 3 | 0 | 1 | 1 | 0 | 0 | 7(3) | 1 |
| 29 | MF | (England) Ben Thornley | 0 | 0 | 0 | 0 | 0 | 0 | 0 | 0 | 0 | 0 | 0 | 0 |
| 30 | DF | (England) John O'Kane | 0 | 0 | 1 | 0 | 1(1) | 0 | 0 | 0 | 0 | 0 | 2(1) | 0 |
| 31 | MF | (Northern Ireland) Keith Gillespie | 3(6) | 1 | 0 | 0 | 3 | 0 | 0 | 0 | 0 | 0 | 6(6) | 1 |

== Transfers ==
=== In ===
| Date | Pos. | Name | From | Fee |
|---|---|---|---|---|
| 1 July 1994 | DF | (England) David May | (England) Blackburn Rovers | £1.4m |
| 12 July 1994 | FW | (England) Graeme Tomlinson | (England) Bradford City | £100k |
| 10 January 1995 | FW | (England) Andy Cole | (England) Newcastle United | £6m + Keith Gillespie |

=== Out ===
| Date | Pos. | Name | To | Fee |
|---|---|---|---|---|
| 1 July 1994 | DF | (Wales) Clayton Blackmore | Free | |
| 1 July 1994 | MF | (Wales) Craig Lawton | (England) Port Vale | Free |
| 11 July 1994 | MF | (England) Mike Phelan | (England) West Bromwich Albion | Free |
| 18 July 1994 | GK | (England) Les Sealey | (England) Blackpool | Free |
| 22 July 1994 | MF | (Wales) Robbie Savage | (England) Crewe Alexandra | Free |
| 5 September 1994 | FW | (Scotland) Colin McKee | (Scotland) Kilmarnock | £350k |
| 5 September 1994 | DF | (England) Neil Whitworth | (Scotland) Kilmarnock | £350k |
| 9 September 1994 | FW | (England) Dion Dublin | (England) Coventry City | £2m |
| 1 January 1995 | DF | (Italy) Giuliano Maiorana | (Sweden) Ljungskile SK | Free |
| 10 January 1995 | MF | (Northern Ireland) Keith Gillespie | (England) Newcastle United | £1m + Andy Cole |
| 15 June 1995 | MF | (England) Paul Ince | (Italy) Inter Milan | £7.5m |
| 23 June 1995 | FW | (Wales) Mark Hughes | (England) Chelsea | £1m |

=== Loan out ===
| Date from | Date to | Position | Name | To |
|---|---|---|---|---|
| 28 February 1995 | 26 March 1995 | MF | (England) David Beckham | (England) Preston North End |
