= 2000–01 Manchester United F.C. season =

English football club season

Manchester United
2000–01 season
- Chairman: Martin Edwards
- Manager: Sir Alex Ferguson
- FA Premier League: 1st
- FA Cup: Fourth round
- League Cup: Fourth round
- UEFA Champions League: Quarter-finals
- Charity Shield: Runners-up
- Top goalscorer: League: Teddy Sheringham (15); All: Teddy Sheringham (21)
- Highest home attendance: 67,637 vs Coventry City (14 April 2001)
- Lowest home attendance: 62,749 vs Anderlecht (13 September 2000)
- Average home league attendance: 67,542
Home colours	Away colours	Third colours

The 2000–01 season was Manchester United's ninth season in the Premier League, and their 26th consecutive season in the top division of English football. United won the Premier League for the third successive season and the seventh time since its inauguration in 1993. They were less successful in cup competitions, going out in the fourth round of the FA Cup, the fourth round of the League Cup and the quarter-finals of the Champions League.

New goalkeeper Fabien Barthez was an instant success, and previous first-choice goalkeeper Mark Bosnich failed to feature in the first team in 2000–01, opting to join Chelsea on a free transfer in January, despite equally limited first-team opportunities at Stamford Bridge. Veteran striker Teddy Sheringham had an excellent season, topping the club's goalscoring charts and gaining both the PFA and FWA Player of the Year awards. However, the arrival of Dutch striker Ruud van Nistelrooy from PSV Eindhoven at the end of the season prompted Sheringham to return to Tottenham Hotspur on a free transfer. Also leaving the club was Henning Berg, who was loaned to his old club Blackburn Rovers just after the start of the season, and moved on a permanent contract in December, joining former United players John Curtis and Mark Hughes in Blackburn's successful campaign that saw them promoted back to the Premier League after a two-year exile.

== Pre-season and friendlies ==
Date	Opponents	H / A	Result F–A	Scorers	Attendance
29 July 2000	York City	A	2–0	Keane (2) 52', 62'	9,003
30 July 2000	Shrewsbury Town	A	8–1	Butt 3', Solskjær (2) 12', 40', Sheringham 51', Clegg 58', Fortune (2) 61' (pen.), 68', Healy 79'	8,000
4 August 2000	Real Madrid	N	1–0	Solskjær 89'	39,000
5 August 2000	Bayern Munich	A	1–3	Fortune 85'	43,000
9 August 2000	Birkirkara	N	5–1	Beckham 18', Yorke 49', Solskjær (2) 53', 74', Scholes 70'	7,614
16 August 2000	Manchester City	H	2–0	Sheringham 36', Cole 85'	45,158
15 May 2001	Celtic	A	2–0	Silvestre 15', Djordjic 88'	57,268

== FA Charity Shield ==
Date	Opponents	H / A	Result F–A	Scorers	Attendance
13 August 2000	Chelsea	N	0–2		65,148

== Premier League ==
Date	Opponents	H / A	Result F–A	Scorers	Attendance	League position
20 August 2000	Newcastle United	H	2–0	Johnsen 20', Cole 69'	67,477	5th
22 August 2000	Ipswich Town	A	1–1	Beckham 39'	22,007	3rd
26 August 2000	West Ham United	A	2–2	Beckham 6', Cole 49'	25,998	5th
5 September 2000	Bradford City	H	6–0	Cole 11', Fortune (2) 23', 60', Sheringham (2) 71', 81', Beckham 85'	67,447	1st
9 September 2000	Sunderland	H	3–0	Scholes (2) 14', 82', Sheringham 76'	67,503	1st
16 September 2000	Everton	A	3–1	Butt 26', Giggs 29', Solskjær 38'	38,541	1st
23 September 2000	Chelsea	H	3–3	Scholes 14', Sheringham 37', Beckham 39'	67,568	1st
1 October 2000	Arsenal	A	0–1		38,146	2nd
14 October 2000	Leicester City	A	3–0	Sheringham (2) 37', 54', Solskjær 90'	22,132	1st
21 October 2000	Leeds United	H	3–0	Yorke 40', Beckham 50', Jones 82' (o.g.)	67,523	1st
28 October 2000	Southampton	H	5–0	Cole (2) 9', 73', Sheringham (3) 45', 51', 55'	67,581	1st
4 November 2000	Coventry City	A	2–1	Cole 27', Beckham 37'	21,079	1st
11 November 2000	Middlesbrough	H	2–1	Butt 62', Sheringham 65'	67,576	1st
18 November 2000	Manchester City	A	1–0	Beckham 2'	34,429	1st
25 November 2000	Derby County	A	3–0	Sheringham 61', Butt 69', Yorke 76'	32,910	1st
2 December 2000	Tottenham Hotspur	H	2–0	Scholes 40', Solskjær 84'	67,583	1st
9 December 2000	Charlton Athletic	A	3–3	Giggs 42', Solskjær 43', Keane 66'	20,043	1st
17 December 2000	Liverpool	H	0–1		67,533	1st
23 December 2000	Ipswich Town	H	2–0	Solskjær (2) 20', 32'	67,597	1st
26 December 2000	Aston Villa	A	1–0	Solskjær 85'	40,889	1st
30 December 2000	Newcastle United	A	1–1	Beckham 25' (pen.)	52,134	1st
1 January 2001	West Ham United	H	3–1	Solskjær 3', Pearce 33' (o.g.), Yorke 57'	67,603	1st
13 January 2001	Bradford City	A	3–0	Sheringham 72', Giggs 75', Chadwick 87'	20,551	1st
20 January 2001	Aston Villa	H	2–0	G. Neville 57', Sheringham 87'	67,533	1st
31 January 2001	Sunderland	A	1–0	Cole 46'	48,260	1st
3 February 2001	Everton	H	1–0	Watson 52' (o.g.)	67,528	1st
10 February 2001	Chelsea	A	1–1	Cole 69'	34,960	1st
25 February 2001	Arsenal	H	6–1	Yorke (3) 3', 18', 22', Keane 26', Solskjær 38', Sheringham 90'	67,535	1st
3 March 2001	Leeds United	A	1–1	Chadwick 64'	40,055	1st
17 March 2001	Leicester City	H	2–0	Yorke 88', Silvestre 90'	67,516	1st
31 March 2001	Liverpool	A	0–2		44,806	1st
10 April 2001	Charlton Athletic	H	2–1	Cole 45', Solskjær 82'	67,505	1st
14 April 2001	Coventry City	H	4–2	Yorke (2) 13', 28', Giggs 81', Scholes 87'	67,637	1st
21 April 2001	Manchester City	H	1–1	Sheringham 71' (pen.)	67,535	1st
28 April 2001	Middlesbrough	A	2–0	P. Neville 4', Beckham 84'	34,417	1st
5 May 2001	Derby County	H	0–1		67,526	1st
13 May 2001	Southampton	A	1–2	Giggs 71'	15,526	1st
19 May 2001	Tottenham Hotspur	A	1–3	Scholes 22'	36,072	1st

Pos	Team	Pld	W	D	L	GF	GA	GD	Pts	Qualification or relegation
1	Manchester United (C)	38	24	8	6	79	31	+48	80	Qualification for the Champions League first group stage
2	Arsenal	38	20	10	8	63	38	+25	70	Qualification for the Champions League first group stage
3	Liverpool	38	20	9	9	71	39	+32	69	Qualification for the Champions League third qualifying round (Note: Since Liverpool won the League Cup and qualified for the Champions League, their UEFA Cup place went to fifth-placed Ipswich Town. Since both FA Cup finalists, Liverpool and Arsenal, qualified for the Champions League, the berth in the UEFA Cup went to sixth-placed Chelsea. Both Ipswich and Chelsea were the highest-ranked team not already qualified for a European competition.)
4	Leeds United	38	20	8	10	64	43	+21	68	Qualification for the UEFA Cup first round
5	Ipswich Town	38	20	6	12	57	42	+15	66	Qualification for the UEFA Cup first round

Source: Premier League
Rules for classification: 1) points; 2) goal difference; 3) number of goals scored.
(C) Champions

== FA Cup ==
Date	Round	Opponents	H / A	Result F–A	Scorers	Attendance
7 January 2001	Round 3	Fulham	A	2–1	Solskjær 8', Sheringham 89'	19,178
28 January 2001	Round 4	West Ham United	H	0–1		67,029

== League Cup ==
Date	Round	Opponents	H / A	Result F–A	Scorers	Attendance
31 October 2000	Round 3	Watford	A	3–0	Solskjær (2) 12', 81', Yorke 54'	18,871
28 November 2000	Round 4	Sunderland	A	1–2 (a.e.t.)	Yorke 31'	47,543

== UEFA Champions League ==
=== Group stage ===
Date	Opponents	H / A	Result F–A	Scorers	Attendance	Group position
13 September 2000	Anderlecht	H	5–1	Cole (3) 15', 50', 72', Irwin 31' (pen.), Sheringham 42'	62,749	1st
19 September 2000	Dynamo Kyiv	A	0–0		65,000	1st
26 September 2000	PSV Eindhoven	A	1–3	Scholes 2' (pen.)	30,500	2nd
18 October 2000	PSV Eindhoven	H	3–1	Sheringham 8', Scholes 82', Yorke 87'	66,313	1st
24 October 2000	Anderlecht	A	1–2	Irwin 36' (pen.)	22,506	3rd
8 November 2000	Dynamo Kyiv	H	1–0	Sheringham 18'	66,776	2nd

Pos	Team	Pld	W	D	L	GF	GA	GD	Pts	Qualification
1	(Belgium) Anderlecht	6	4	0	2	11	14	−3	12	Advance to second group stage
2	(England) Manchester United	6	3	1	2	11	7	+4	10	Advance to second group stage
3	(Netherlands) PSV Eindhoven	6	3	0	3	9	9	0	9	Transfer to UEFA Cup
4	(Ukraine) Dynamo Kyiv	6	1	1	4	7	8	−1	4	

Source: UEFA

=== Second group stage ===
Date	Opponents	H / A	Result F–A	Scorers	Attendance	Group position
21 November 2000	Panathinaikos	H	3–1	Sheringham 48', Scholes (2) 81', 90'	65,024	1st
6 December 2000	Sturm Graz	A	2–0	Scholes 18', Giggs 89'	16,500	1st
14 February 2001	Valencia	A	0–0		49,541	1st
20 February 2001	Valencia	H	1–1	Cole 12'	66,715	1st
7 March 2001	Panathinaikos	A	1–1	Scholes 90'	27,231	2nd
13 March 2001	Sturm Graz	H	3–0	Butt 5', Sheringham 20', Keane 86'	66,404	2nd

Pos	Team	Pld	W	D	L	GF	GA	GD	Pts	Qualification
1	(Spain) Valencia	6	3	3	0	10	2	+8	12	Advance to knockout stage
2	(England) Manchester United	6	3	3	0	10	3	+7	12	Advance to knockout stage
3	(Austria) Sturm Graz	6	2	0	4	4	13	−9	6	
4	(Greece) Panathinaikos	6	0	2	4	4	10	−6	2	

Source: UEFA

=== Knockout phase ===
Date	Round	Opponents	H / A	Result F–A	Scorers	Attendance
3 April 2001	Quarter-final; First leg	Bayern Munich	H	0–1		66,584
18 April 2001	Quarter-final; Second leg	Bayern Munich	A	1–2	Giggs 49'	60,000

== Squad statistics ==
No.	Pos.	Name	League		FA Cup		League Cup		Europe		Other		Total	
No.	Pos.	Name	Apps	Goals	Apps	Goals	Apps	Goals	Apps	Goals	Apps	Goals	Apps	Goals
1	GK	(France) Fabien Barthez	30	0	1	0	0	0	12	0	1	0	44	0
2	DF	(England) Gary Neville	32	1	2	0	0	0	14	0	1	0	49	1
3	DF	(Republic of Ireland) Denis Irwin	20(1)	0	1	0	0	0	7	2	1	0	29(1)	2
4	DF	(England) David May	1(1)	0	0	0	0	0	0	0	0	0	1(1)	0
5	DF	(Norway) Ronny Johnsen	11	1	0	0	1	0	4	0	1	0	17	1
6	DF	(Netherlands) Jaap Stam	15	0	1	0	0	0	6	0	0(1)	0	22(1)	0
7	MF	(England) David Beckham	29(2)	9	2	0	0	0	11(1)	0	1	0	43(3)	9
8	MF	(England) Nicky Butt	24(4)	3	2	0	0	0	8(3)	1	0	0	34(7)	4
9	FW	(England) Andy Cole	15(4)	9	1	0	0	0	10	4	0(1)	0	26(5)	13
10	FW	(England) Teddy Sheringham	23(6)	15	1(1)	1	0	0	8(3)	5	1	0	33(10)	21
11	MF	(Wales) Ryan Giggs	24(7)	5	2	0	0	0	9(2)	2	1	0	36(9)	7
12	DF	(England) Phil Neville	24(5)	1	1	0	2	0	4(2)	0	0	0	31(7)	1
13	GK	(Australia) Mark Bosnich	0	0	0	0	0	0	0	0	0	0	0	0
14	GK	(Scotland) Andy Goram	2	0	0	0	0	0	0	0	0	0	2	0
15	MF	(Sweden) Jesper Blomqvist	0	0	0	0	0	0	0	0	0	0	0	0
16	MF	(Republic of Ireland) Roy Keane (c)	28	2	2	0	0	0	13	1	1	0	44	3
17	GK	(Netherlands) Raimond van der Gouw	5(5)	0	1	0	2	0	2	0	0	0	10(5)	0
18	MF	(England) Paul Scholes	28(4)	6	0	0	0	0	12	6	1	0	40(4)	12
19	FW	(Trinidad and Tobago) Dwight Yorke	15(7)	9	1(1)	0	2	2	7(4)	1	0(1)	0	25(13)	12
20	FW	(Norway) Ole Gunnar Solskjær	19(12)	10	1(1)	1	2	2	3(8)	0	1	0	26(21)	13
21	DF	(Norway) Henning Berg	0(1)	0	0	0	0	0	0	0	0	0	0(1)	0
22	DF	(England) Ronnie Wallwork	4(8)	0	0(1)	0	2	0	0(1)	0	0	0	6(10)	0
23	DF	(England) Michael Clegg	0	0	0	0	2	0	0	0	0	0	2	0
24	DF	(England) Wes Brown	25(3)	0	1	0	1	0	9(2)	0	0	0	36(5)	0
25	MF	(South Africa) Quinton Fortune	6(1)	2	0	0	2	0	0(1)	0	0(1)	0	8(3)	2
27	DF	(France) Mikaël Silvestre	25(5)	1	2	0	0	0	13(1)	0	1	0	41(6)	1
28	MF	(Scotland) Michael Stewart	3	0	0	0	0(2)	0	0	0	0	0	3(2)	0
30	DF	(Republic of Ireland) John O'Shea	0	0	0	0	2	0	0	0	0	0	2	0
32	MF	(Sweden) Bojan Djordjic	0(1)	0	0	0	0	0	0	0	0	0	0(1)	0
33	GK	(England) Paul Rachubka	1	0	0	0	0(1)	0	0	0	0	0	1(1)	0
34	MF	(England) Jonathan Greening	3(4)	0	0	0	2	0	1(1)	0	0	0	6(5)	0
35	FW	(Northern Ireland) David Healy	0(1)	0	0	0	0(1)	0	0	0	0	0	0(2)	0
36	MF	(England) Luke Chadwick	6(10)	2	0(1)	0	2	0	1(2)	0	0	0	9(13)	2
37	FW	(England) Danny Webber	0	0	0	0	0(1)	0	0	0	0	0	0(1)	0

== Transfers ==
On the way out of United, during the summer were defender Danny Higginbotham, goalkeeper Massimo Taibi, midfielder Jordi Cruyff, and forward Alex Notman. Higginbotham left United for Derby County, after three years to fulfil his desire to play more first team football, Taibi signed for Reggina, after he had been on loan at the club during the second half of the 1999–2000 season, Cruyff signed for Alavés, after his United contract had expired, and Notman, who had never played a Premier League match for United, signed for Norwich City, where he would remain for three years.

French goalkeeper Fabien Barthez would be United only signing in May 2000. No players arrived at United throughout the whole 2000–01 season.

Leaving United during the winter were Norwegian defender Henning Berg, who signed for Blackburn Rovers for a fee of £1.75 million, Northern Irish forward David Healy, who signed for Preston North End for a fee of £1.5 million, and Australian goalkeeper Mark Bosnich, who signed for Chelsea on a free transfer, after United had signed Fabien Barthez in the 2000 close season. Forward Teddy Sheringham left United to rejoin Tottenham Hotspur on 26 May.

=== Out ===
Date	Pos.	Name	To	Fee
5 July 2000	DF	(England) Danny Higginbotham	(England) Derby County	£2m
8 July 2000	GK	(Italy) Massimo Taibi	(Italy) Reggina	£2.5m
10 July 2000	MF	(Netherlands) Jordi Cruyff	(Spain) Alavés	Free
28 November 2000	FW	(Scotland) Alex Notman	(England) Norwich City	£250k
15 December 2000	DF	(Norway) Henning Berg	(England) Blackburn Rovers	£1.75m
3 January 2001	FW	(Northern Ireland) David Healy	(England) Preston North End	£1.5m
18 January 2001	GK	(Australia) Mark Bosnich	(England) Chelsea	Free
26 May 2001	FW	(England) Teddy Sheringham	(England) Tottenham Hotspur	Free

=== Loan in ===
Date from	Date to	Pos.	Name	From	Fee
22 March 2001	31 May 2001	GK	(Scotland) Andy Goram	(Scotland) Motherwell	£100k
