= Gary Pallister =

English footballer and sports television pundit (born 1965)

Personal information
- Full name: Gary Andrew Pallister
- Date of birth: 30 June 1965 (age 61)
- Place of birth: Ramsgate, Kent, England
- Height: 6 ft 4 in (1.93 m)
- Position: Centre-back

Youth career
- Billingham Town

Senior career*
| Years | Team | Apps | (Gls) |
| 1984–1989 | Middlesbrough | 156 | (5) |
| 1985 | → Darlington (loan) | 7 | (0) |
| 1989–1998 | Manchester United | 317 | (12) |
| 1998–2001 | Middlesbrough | 55 | (1) |
| Total | | 535 | (18) |

International career
| 1988–1996 | England | 22 | (0) |
| 1989–1992 | England B | 9 | (0) |
- * Club domestic league appearances and goals

Gary Andrew Pallister (born 30 June 1965) is an English former professional footballer and sports television pundit. As a player he was a defender from 1984 to 2001 and is most noted for his nine-year spell at Manchester United, where he formed a formidable defensive partnership with Steve Bruce and won 15 trophies including four Premier League titles, three FA Cups and the European Cup Winners Cup.

Pallister also had two spells with Middlesbrough that yielded over 200 appearances combined over both periods, as well as briefly playing on loan with Darlington in 1985. He was capped 22 times by England between 1988 and 1996, as well as earning nine caps for the England B team.

Following his retirement, Pallister has worked in the media and has appeared as a television pundit for both BBC Sport and ITV Sport, with appearances on Football Focus and Final Score.

== Club career ==
=== Middlesbrough ===
Although born in Ramsgate, Kent, Pallister grew up in Norton, County Durham and supported nearby Middlesbrough F.C. His footballing career started at non-league Billingham Town. At the age of 19 he joined his boyhood club, Middlesbrough, as a defender; he made 156 league appearances over nearly five seasons, and helped them win consecutive promotions to the Football League Second Division in 1987, and then the First Division in 1988. He moved to Manchester United on 29 August 1989 for £2.3 million.

=== Manchester United ===
Pallister's transfer broke the national record for a fee paid for a defender, as well as being the highest fee between British clubs, and the second highest fee to be paid by a British club (second only to Ian Rush's return to Liverpool from Juventus a year earlier).

Pallister had the rare achievement of representing the England national side before appearing in the top flight; in 1988 when playing in the Second Division for Middlesbrough. Later that year he helped 'Boro win their second successive promotion and reach the First Division, just two years after they almost went out of business, but was unable to keep them there and they were relegated on the final day of the 1988–89 season. He began the 1989–90 season with Middlesbrough in the Second Division before his move to United was completed.

Although it was his excellent defensive displays that helped Manchester United to the league title along with Steve Bruce at the heart of the defence, forming one of the best central defensive partnerships in the club's history, in the 1992–93 season, he scored a memorable goal in the final home game of the season against Blackburn Rovers. Into stoppage time, with his team winning 2–1, he stepped up to drive a free-kick into the bottom corner from the edge of the penalty area. It was his first goal of the season. He partnered Bruce in central defence for virtually every game until Bruce left United to join Birmingham City on a free transfer at the end of the 1995–96 season. The following campaign saw Pallister partnered with either Bruce's former understudy David May or with new signing Ronny Johnsen, and ended with United winning their fourth league title in five seasons. A highlight of this season for Pallister was scoring twice in a 3–1 win against Liverpool at Anfield.

The final season Pallister played for Manchester United was the 1997–98 season in which Manchester United came second in the league table, losing by one point to Arsenal.

During his time at Manchester United, Pallister won the FA Cup in 1990, 1994 and 1996, the UEFA Cup Winners' Cup in 1991, the Football League Cup in 1992 and Premier League titles in 1993, 1994, 1996 and 1997, amongst other honours. He was also part of the team that came second in the league in 1992, 1995 and 1998, as well as the team that finished runners-up in the League Cup in 1991 and 1994 and the FA Cup in 1995. By the time of his departure from Old Trafford after nine years, he was the only player to have collected winner's medals in all of the club's successes under Alex Ferguson's management, and second only to Brian McClair (who left United at the same time) he was the club's longest serving player.

He also scored some crucial goals for United. He scored an equaliser in extra time against Crystal Palace in the 1994–95 FA Cup semi-final at Villa Park, forcing a replay which United won and in which Pallister made the scoresheet once again. In April 1997, he scored twice against Liverpool in a match billed the "title decider" which ended in a 3–1 United win at Anfield. These would be the last two goals he scored for the club, who went on to win their fourth league title in five seasons shortly afterwards. His first goal for United had come on 12 November 1989, as he scored their only goal in the 1–0 home win over Nottingham Forest in the First Division.

=== Return to Middlesbrough ===
With Pallister now aged 33 and United having signed Jaap Stam from PSV Eindhoven, Pallister was sold back to Middlesbrough in July 1998 for £2.5 million, £200,000 more than when he first moved to Manchester United. He was brought back to Teesside by manager Bryan Robson, who had played alongside Pallister at Old Trafford until 1994. He scored once against Southampton in 55 league appearances, as well as appearing in two FA Cup matches and four League Cup matches.

His final playing season, in which Middlesbrough finished 14th in the table, was season 2000–01. He retired from playing due to a succession of injuries on 4 July 2001, at the age of 36, just three weeks after the appointment of Steve McClaren as manager following the departure of Robson.

== International career ==
=== B team ===
Pallister made his debut for the England B team in May 1989; he started the match against Switzerland before being replaced by Alan McLeary in the 2−0 win at Stadion Schützenwiese. He made eight more appearances over the next three years with the last coming in the 3−0 victory against France in February 1992.

=== Senior ===
Pallister made his debut for England in the friendly with Hungary in April 1988. He played the whole game in the goalless draw at Népstadion in Budapest. He had to wait over three years to make his competitive debut when he played in the win against Turkey during qualifying for UEFA Euro 1992. England qualified for the tournament finals in Sweden but Pallister was not selected in the squad. He featured in the United States Cup in June 1993; he started the defeats against the United States and Germany, and the draw against Brazil, as England finished last place in the group. Pallister played three matches as England failed to qualify for the 1994 FIFA World Cup. He was used sporadically over the next three years, mainly playing in friendlies, before making his last appearances in the 1998 FIFA World Cup qualifiers against Moldova and Poland in the autumn of 1996. Overall, Pallister won 22 caps and scored no goals.

== Media career ==
He has since worked as a TV football pundit, appearing on the BBC and ITV.

== Personal life ==
In September 2010, Pallister became an Operations Director with former club Darlington.

== Honours ==
Middlesbrough

- Football League Second Division play-offs: 1988

Manchester United

- Premier League: 1992–93, 1993–94, 1995–96, 1996–97
- FA Cup: 1989–90, 1993–94, 1995–96
- Football League Cup: 1991–92; runner-up: 1990–91, 1993–94
- FA Charity Shield: 1990 (shared), 1993, 1994, 1996, 1997
- European Cup Winners' Cup: 1990–91
- European Super Cup: 1991

Individual

- Sir Matt Busby Player of the Year: 1989–90
- PFA Players' Player of the Year: 1991–92
- PFA Team of the Year: 1986–87 Third Division, 1987–88 Second Division, 1991–92 First Division, 1992–93 Premier League, 1993–94 Premier League, 1994–95 Premier League, 1997–98 Premier League
