= 1990 FA Charity Shield =

- The match programme cover
| Liverpool | Manchester United |
| 1 | 1 |
- Date: 18 August 1990
- Venue: Wembley Stadium, London
- Referee: George Courtney (County Durham)
- Attendance: 66,558

The 1990 FA Charity Shield (also known as the Tennent's FA Charity Shield for sponsorship reasons) was the 68th Charity Shield, a football match contested by the winners of the previous season's Football League and FA Cup competitions. The match was played on 18 August 1990 between 1989–90 Football League champions Liverpool and 1989–90 FA Cup winners Manchester United.

Utility player Clayton Blackmore opened the scoring for United in the first half, but a John Barnes penalty kick drew Liverpool level shortly after the break. The match finished at 1–1 and the two sides shared the trophy for six months each.

Absent from the game for Manchester United were captain Bryan Robson, who would be out of action until December that year due to injury; left-back Lee Martin who scored the winning goal in the FA Cup Final three months previously; and midfielder Neil Webb. Their places in the starting XI were taken by Clayton Blackmore, Mal Donaghy and newly signed full-back from Oldham, Denis Irwin, beginning a 12-year spell with the club that would reap numerous honours, while Paul Ince moved back into his usual midfield position.

As a curtain-raiser to the match, the England women's national football team played Italy. Carolina Morace scored all four goals in England's 4–1 defeat and made it onto the front page of the following day's La Gazzetta dello Sport.

== Match details ==
18 August 1990
15:00

| Liverpool | 1–1 | Manchester United |
|---|---|---|
| Barnes 51' (pen.) | | Blackmore 44' |

Wembley Stadium, London
Attendance: 66,558
Referee: George Courtney (County Durham)

| Liverpool | Manchester United |

| GK | 1 | (Zimbabwe) Bruce Grobbelaar |
| CB | 2 | (Sweden) Glenn Hysén |
| LB | 3 | (England) David Burrows |
| RB | 4 | (England) Barry Venison |
| CM | 5 | (Republic of Ireland) Ronnie Whelan (c) |
| CB | 6 | (England) Gary Ablett |
| CF | 7 | (England) Peter Beardsley | (substituted off) 78' |
| RM | 8 | (Republic of Ireland) Ray Houghton |
| CF | 9 | (Wales) Ian Rush |
| LM | 10 | (England) John Barnes |
| CM | 11 | (England) Steve McMahon |
Substitutes:
| FW | 12 | (Israel) Ronny Rosenthal | (substituted on) 78' |
| GK | 13 | (England) Mike Hooper |
| DF | 14 | (Scotland) Gary Gillespie |
| DF | 15 | (Republic of Ireland) Steve Staunton |
| MF | 16 | (Northern Ireland) Jim Magilton |
Manager:
(Scotland) Kenny Dalglish

| GK | 1 | (England) Les Sealey |
| RB | 2 | (Republic of Ireland) Denis Irwin |
| LB | 3 | (Northern Ireland) Mal Donaghy |
| CB | 4 | (England) Steve Bruce (c) |
| RM | 5 | (England) Mike Phelan |
| CB | 6 | (England) Gary Pallister |
| CM | 7 | (Wales) Clayton Blackmore |
| CM | 8 | (England) Paul Ince |
| CF | 9 | (Scotland) Brian McClair |
| CF | 10 | (Wales) Mark Hughes |
| LM | 11 | (England) Danny Wallace | (substituted off) 25' |
Substitutes:
| FW | 12 | (England) Mark Robins | (substituted on) 25' |
| GK | 13 | (Scotland) Jim Leighton |
| MF | 14 | (England) Lee Sharpe |
| DF | 15 | (England) Viv Anderson |
| MF | 16 | (England) Russell Beardsmore |
Manager:
(Scotland) Alex Ferguson
