= Denis Irwin =

Irish footballer (born 1965)

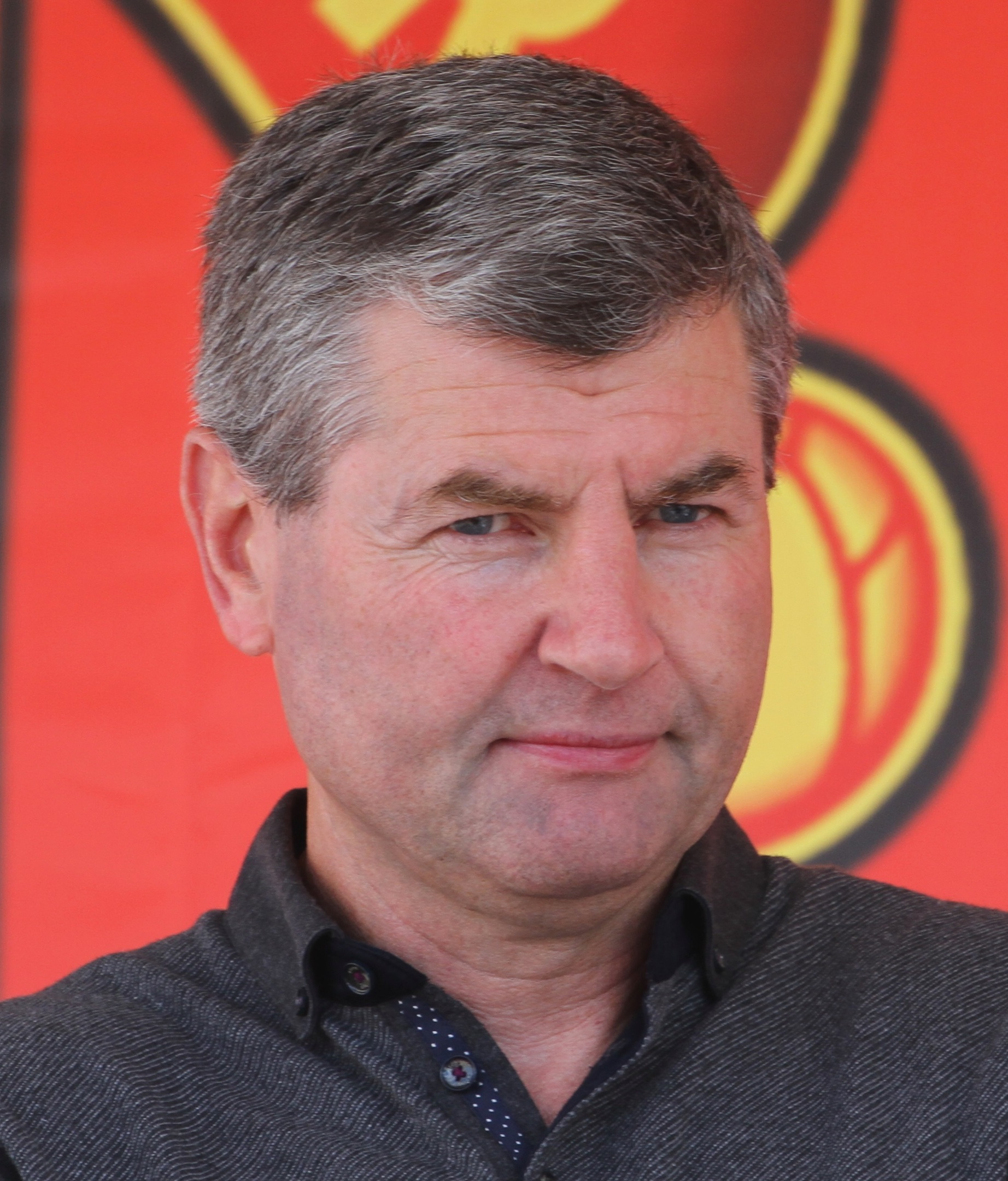
- Irwin in 2017

Personal information
- Full name: Joseph Denis Irwin
- Date of birth: 31 October 1965 (age 61)
- Place of birth: Cork, Ireland
- Height: 1.73 m (5 ft 8 in)
- Position: Full back

Youth career
- –1983: Leeds United

Senior career*
Years	Team	Apps	(Gls)
1983–1986	Leeds United	72	(1)
1986–1990	Oldham Athletic	167	(4)
1990–2002	Manchester United	368	(22)
2002–2004	Wolverhampton Wanderers	75	(2)
Total		682	(29)

International career
1986–1987	Republic of Ireland U21	3	(0)
1989	Republic of Ireland U23	1	(1)
1990	Republic of Ireland B	1	(0)
1990–1999	Republic of Ireland	56	(4)
- * Club domestic league appearances and goals

Joseph Denis Irwin (born 31 October 1965) is an Irish former professional footballer and sports television presenter. Irwin is the joint most successful Irish footballer in history, a record he shares with Ronnie Whelan and fellow Manchester United stalwart Roy Keane, having won 19 trophies in his career.

As a player, he played as a full back from 1983 to 2004. Irwin is best known for his long and successful stint at Manchester United, where he established himself as one of the most important players in a team that won a host of domestic and European trophies from 1990 to 2002, including seven Premier League titles and the UEFA Champions League. He has been regarded by Alex Ferguson as, pound for pound, his greatest ever signing. Earlier in his career he played for Leeds United and then Oldham Athletic, and finished his career with a two-year spell at Wolverhampton Wanderers, the club he supported as a child.

Irwin was capped by the Republic of Ireland national side 56 times, scoring four goals and featuring in the side that reached the second round (last 16) at the 1994 FIFA World Cup.

Overall, he made over 1,000 appearances in his career.

== Early life ==
Irwin was born and raised in Cork, County Cork, and was educated at Togher Boys' National School and Coláiste Chríost Rí. As a schoolboy, he excelled at both Gaelic football and hurling, and played at Croke Park more than once, on one occasion marking future teammate Niall Quinn.

== Club career ==
=== Early career ===
Irwin began his career with Leeds United in 1983, making 72 appearances in the Second Division, before moving on to Oldham Athletic on a free transfer in 1986. He helped Oldham reach the semi-finals of the FA Cup and the final of the League Cup in 1990 before he was transferred to Manchester United for a fee of £650,000.

=== Manchester United ===
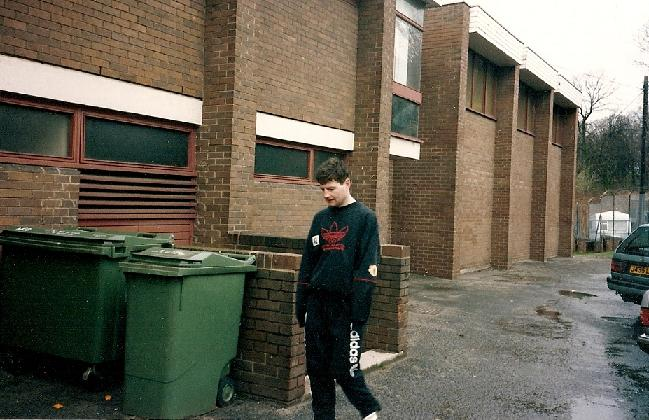
Irwin outside The Cliff in 1992

In 12 years at Old Trafford, he made 296 Premier League appearances and won seven Premier League title medals, as well as two FA Cup winner's medals (1994 and 1996), a League Cup winner's medal, and UEFA Champions League and European Cup Winners' Cup honours. He was comfortable in either of the full back positions and an expert at free kicks and penalties, and even in his mid-thirties he was still United's first-choice left back in preference to the younger Phil Neville.

He scored a total of 22 league goals for Manchester United, including several penalties. The first of these came on 7 September 1991 in a 3–0 home win over Norwich City in the First Division.

Notable goals came on 26 December 1991, when he scored twice in a 6–3 away league win over his old club Oldham Athletic, and his late winner against Southampton in May 1995 which kept the league title race open until the final match.

Irwin was awarded a testimonial match for Manchester United – played on 16 August 2000 against Manchester City at Old Trafford. Despite testimonials being friendly matches, due to the match being between local rivals it was a physical affair. Irwin went off injured in the 37th minute after a bad challenge by City striker George Weah.

Irwin made his last appearance for Manchester United at Old Trafford against Charlton Athletic on the final day of the 2001–02 Premier League season (11 May 2002), which ended in a 0–0 draw. For his final appearance as a Manchester United player, Alex Ferguson awarded him the captain's armband.

=== Wolverhampton Wanderers ===
Irwin joined Wolverhampton Wanderers on a free transfer after the 2001–02 season, coincidentally joining the Black Country club at the same time as his former Manchester United teammate Paul Ince made the move to the West Midlands club, having previously been at Middlesbrough. Irwin scored twice in his first season at Wolves, against Burnley and Grimsby.

After Wolves won promotion to the Premier League in 2003, Irwin was applauded by the Manchester United supporters when he walked onto the pitch at Old Trafford for an early season league match which United won 1–0.

Wolves were relegated at the end of the 2003–04 season, and the 38-year-old Irwin then announced his retirement.

== International career ==
Irwin played for the Republic of Ireland national under-19 team that qualified for the 1983 UEFA European Under-18 Championship and the 1984 UEFA European Under-18 Championship. He was capped 56 times for the Republic of Ireland between 1990 and 1999, and scored four goals. His first appearance came on 12 September 1990 (just after his move to Manchester United), when he helped them beat Morocco 1–0 in a friendly at Dalymount Park. He made his competitive international debut on 17 October 1990, when the national side began their UEFA Euro 1992 qualifying campaign with a 5–0 win over Turkey at Lansdowne Road. He scored his first international goal on 29 April 1992 in a friendly against the United States at Lansdowne Road. His final international appearance came on 17 November 1999, at the age of 34, when Republic of Ireland lost to Turkey in the UEFA Euro 2000 qualifying play-off second leg in Bursa.

Irwin made his only international tournament appearance for Republic of Ireland at the 1994 FIFA World Cup in the United States. He started at right back in the team's first two group matches; a 1–0 victory against Italy and a 2–1 loss to Mexico. He was then suspended for Republic of Ireland's final group game (0–0 draw vs. Norway) and was an unused substitute in the 2–0 loss to the Netherlands in the Round of 16.

== Style of play ==
Considered by pundits to be one of the best full-backs of his generation and in Premier League history, Irwin was comfortable with both feet, which allowed him to play either as a left-back or as a right-back. A good crosser of the ball, in 2021, Gary Lineker praised Irwin for his intelligence and passing ability. He was also known for his work-rate and consistency. Despite being a defender known for his strong tackling ability, he was also known for his eye for goal, courtesy of his abilities at free kicks and penalties; as such he was capable of assisting his team both defensively and offensively.

== Media career ==
Since 2004, Irwin has worked as a presenter on MUTV. Irwin has been involved in coverage of several football tournaments on RTÉ. He is also a columnist with Ireland's Sunday World newspaper. He contributed to RTÉ Sport's coverage of the 2010 FIFA World Cup.

== Career statistics ==
=== Club ===
Appearances and goals by club, season and competition
Club	Season	League			FA Cup		League Cup		Continental		Other		Total	
Club	Season	Division	Apps	Goals	Apps	Goals	Apps	Goals	Apps	Goals	Apps	Goals	Apps	Goals
Leeds United	1983–84	Second Division	12	0	1	0	0	0	—		—		13	0
Leeds United	1984–85	Second Division	41	1	1	0	3	0	—		—		45	1
Leeds United	1985–86	Second Division	19	0	1	0	2	0	—		2 (Note: Appearance(s) in Full Members' Cup)	0	24	0
Leeds United	Total		72	1	3	0	5	0	—		2	0	82	1
Oldham Athletic	1986–87	Second Division	41	1	2	0	3	0	—		3 (Note: One appearance in Full Members' Cup, two in Second Division play-offs)	0	49	1
Oldham Athletic	1987–88	Second Division	43	0	1	0	5	3	—		0	0	49	3
Oldham Athletic	1988–89	Second Division	41	2	1	0	3	0	—		1	0	46	2
Oldham Athletic	1989–90	Second Division	42	1	9	0	8	0	—		1	0	60	1
Oldham Athletic	Total		167	4	13	0	19	3	0	0	5	0	204	7
Manchester United	1990–91	First Division	34	0	3	0	8	0	6 (Note: Appearances in European Cup Winners' Cup)	0	1 (Note: Appearance in FA Charity Shield)	0	52	0
Manchester United	1991–92	First Division	38	4	3	0	7	0	2	0	1 (Note: Appearance in European Super Cup)	0	51	4
Manchester United	1992–93	Premier League	40	5	3	0	3	0	2 (Note: Appearance(s) in UEFA Cup)	0	—		48	5
Manchester United	1993–94	Premier League	42	2	7	2	9	0	3 (Note: Appearances in UEFA Champions League)	0	1	0	62	4
Manchester United	1994–95	Premier League	40	2	7	4	2	0	5	0	0	0	54	6
Manchester United	1995–96	Premier League	31	1	6	0	1	0	1	0	—		39	1
Manchester United	1996–97	Premier League	31	1	3	0	0	0	8	0	1	0	43	1
Manchester United	1997–98	Premier League	25	2	4	0	1	0	6	2	1	0	37	4
Manchester United	1998–99	Premier League	29	2	6	1	0	0	12	0	1	0	48	3
Manchester United	1999–2000	Premier League	25	3	—		0	0	13	0	4 (Note: One appearance in FA Charity Shield, one in Intercontinental Cup, two in FIFA Club World Championship)	0	42	3
Manchester United	2000–01	Premier League	21	0	1	0	0	0	7	2	1	0	30	2
Manchester United	2001–02	Premier League	12	0	0	0	0	0	10	0	1	0	23	0
Manchester United	Total		368	22	43	7	31	0	75	4	12	0	529	33
Wolverhampton Wanderers	2002–03	First Division	43	2	4	0	2	0	—		3 (Note: Appearances in First Division play-offs)	0	52	2
Wolverhampton Wanderers	2003–04	Premier League	32	0	1	0	0	0	—		—		33	0
Wolverhampton Wanderers	Total		75	2	5	0	2	0	—		3	0	85	2
Career total			682	29	64	7	57	3	75	4	22	0	900	43

=== International ===
Appearances and goals by national team and year
National team	Year	Apps	Goals
Republic of Ireland	1990	2	0
Republic of Ireland	1991	6	0
Republic of Ireland	1992	8	1
Republic of Ireland	1993	8	0
Republic of Ireland	1994	7	0
Republic of Ireland	1995	8	0
Republic of Ireland	1996	4	0
Republic of Ireland	1997	4	1
Republic of Ireland	1998	3	1
Republic of Ireland	1999	6	1
Total		56	4

Republic of Ireland score listed first, score column indicates score after each Irwin goal

List of international goals scored by Denis Irwin
No.	Date	Venue	Cap	Opponent	Score	Result	Competition	Ref.
1	29 April 1992	Lansdowne Road, Dublin, Ireland	10	United States	2–0	4–1	Friendly	
2	29 October 1997	Lansdowne Road, Dublin, Ireland	47	Belgium	1–0	1–1	1998 FIFA World Cup qualification	
3	5 September 1998	Lansdowne Road, Dublin, Ireland	49	Croatia	1–0	2–0	UEFA Euro 2000 qualifying	
4	10 February 1999	Lansdowne Road, Dublin, Ireland	51	Paraguay	1–0	2–0	Friendly	

== Honours ==
Oldham Athletic

- Football League Cup runner-up: 1989–90

Manchester United

- Premier League: 1992–93, 1993–94, 1995–96, 1996–97, 1998–99, 1999–2000, 2000–01
- FA Cup: 1993–94, 1995–96; runner-up: 1994–95
- Football League Cup: 1991–92; runner-up: 1990–91, 1993–94
- FA Charity Shield: 1990 (shared), 1993, 1996, 1997
- UEFA Champions League: 1998–99
- European Cup Winners' Cup: 1990–91
- European Super Cup: 1991
- Intercontinental Cup: 1999

Wolverhampton Wanderers

- Football League First Division play-offs: 2003

Individual

- PFA Team of the Year: 1989–90 Second Division, 1993–94 Premier League, 1998–99 Premier League, 2002–03 First Division
- PFA Team of the Century (1997–2007): 2007
- English Football Hall of Fame: 2016
