= Graeme Tomlinson =

English footballer

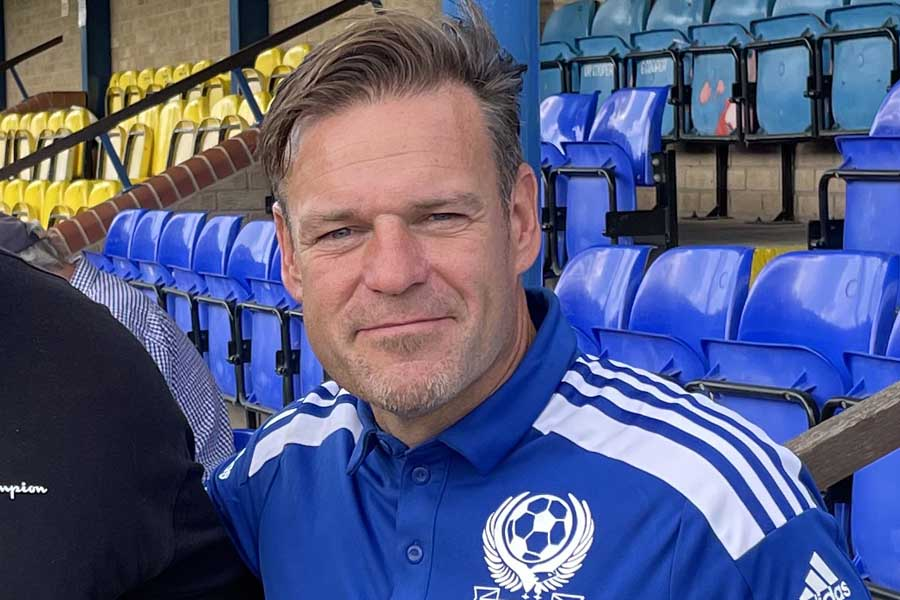

Personal information
- Full name: Graeme Murdoch Tomlinson
- Date of birth: 10 December 1975 (age 50)
- Place of birth: Watford, England
- Height: 5 ft 9 in (1.75 m)
- Position: Forward

Youth career
- ?–1993: Bradford City

Senior career*
Years	Team	Apps	(Gls)
1993–1994	Bradford City	17	(6)
1994–1998	Manchester United	0	(0)
1995	→ Wimbledon (loan)	0	(0)
1996	→ Luton Town (loan)	7	(0)
1997	→ AFC Bournemouth (loan)	7	(1)
1998	→ Millwall (loan)	3	(1)
1998–2000	Macclesfield Town	46	(6)
2000–2002	Exeter City	56	(6)
2002	Stevenage Borough	?	(?)
2002–2003	Kingstonian	?	(?)
2003	Bedford Town	?	(?)
2003	St Albans City	?	(?)
2003–2004	Stotfold	?	(?)
2004–2005	Dunstable Town	?	(?)
- * Club domestic league appearances and goals

Graeme Murdoch Tomlinson (born 10 December 1975) is an English former footballer who played as a forward.

Tomlinson notably played for Manchester United and Wimbledon whilst both were Premier League sides but appearances for both teams only came in cup competitions. He spent most of his career in the Football League with Bradford City, Luton Town, AFC Bournemouth, Millwall, Macclesfield Town and Exeter City. He also played semi-professionally at non-league level for Stevenage Borough, Kingstonian, Bedford Town, St Albans City, Stotfold and Dunstable Town.

== Career ==
Born in Watford, Tomlinson began his career in the Football League for Bradford City, scoring six goals in 17 Division Two games, before joining Manchester United for £100,000 in the summer of 1994. His only first team appearance for United came in October 1994, when he came on as a substitute in a League Cup second round tie against Port Vale at Old Trafford, although he would remain at the club until the end of his four-year contract.

He had a brief loan spell at Wimbledon in 1995, featuring in their makeshift squad for the 1995 UEFA Intertoto Cup along with fellow United players Michael Appleton and John O'Kane, and then returned to Old Trafford to play in the reserve team.

He was loaned to Luton Town in March 1996, but suffered a compound leg fracture in a Division One fixture against Port Vale, and was out of action for the next year. On regaining his fitness, he had loan spells with AFC Bournemouth and Millwall, and left Old Trafford when his contract expired in the summer of 1998.

He then joined Macclesfield Town and then played for Exeter City. He scored 20 goals in 136 appearances. After a brief trial with back at Bradford City, he later played non-league football for Stevenage Borough, Kingstonian, Bedford Town, St Albans City, Stotfold and Dunstable Town.

== Personal life ==
Tomlinson later obtained his coaching badges, alongside pursuing other business ventures and owning property.
