= Brian McClair =

Scottish footballer (born 1963)

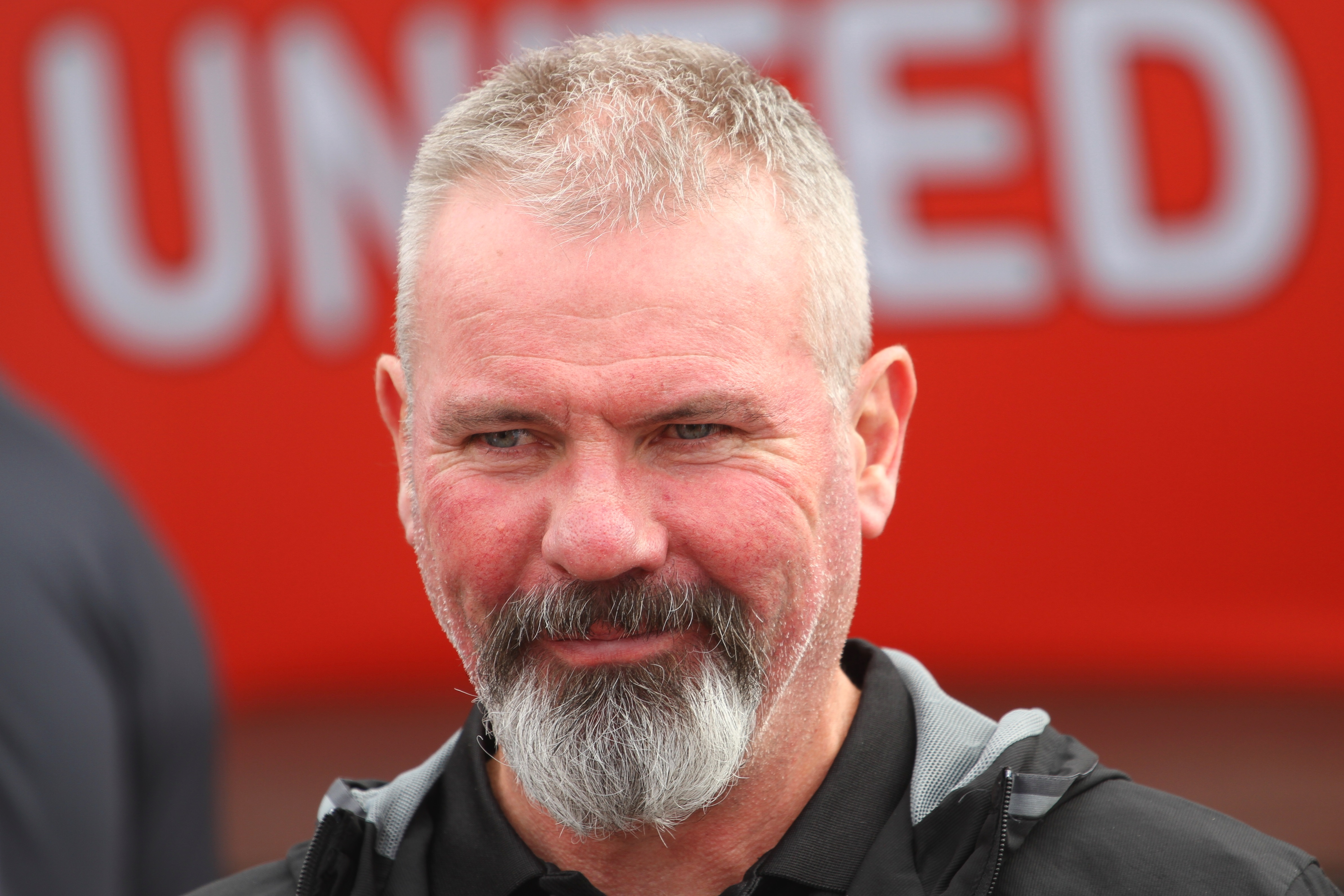
- McClair in 2017

Personal information
- Full name: Brian John McClair
- Date of birth: 8 December 1963 (age 62)
- Place of birth: Bellshill, Lanarkshire, Scotland
- Height: 5 ft 10 in (1.78 m)
- Positions: Forward; midfielder

Youth career
- 1980–1981: Aston Villa

Senior career*
Years	Team	Apps	(Gls)
1981–1983	Motherwell	40	(15)
1983–1987	Celtic	145	(99)
1987–1998	Manchester United	355	(88)
1998	Motherwell	11	(0)
Total		551	(202)

International career
1983–1985	Scotland U21	8	(2)
1986–1993	Scotland	30	(2)
1990	Scotland B	1	(0)

Managerial career
- 1998–1999: Blackburn Rovers (assistant)
- 2006–2015: Manchester United (Director of Youth Academy)
- * Club domestic league appearances and goals

Brian John McClair (born 8 December 1963) is a Scottish football coach and former professional footballer. As a player, he was a forward from 1980 to 1998, notable for his near 11-year spell at Manchester United where he won 14 trophies including four Premier League titles, two FA Cups and the European Cup Winners' Cup.

McClair also had important tenures at Scottish clubs Celtic and Motherwell, winning the Scottish League and Scottish Cup with the former. At Motherwell, he combined his football with studying mathematics at the University of Glasgow. He was nicknamed "Choccy", as his last name rhymed with the delicacy "chocolate éclair".

McClair played in 30 international games for Scotland between 1986 and 1993, and was selected for their squad at UEFA Euro 1992.

After retiring from playing, McClair took on a coaching role at Blackburn Rovers before returning to Manchester United, where he spent several years as Youth Academy Director.

== Club career ==
=== Early career ===
McClair began his career with Aston Villa on leaving school in 1980, but left after one season (in which Villa were Football League champions) having never played a competitive game.

He then returned to Scotland in the summer of 1981 and signed for Motherwell. Initially a midfielder, manager Jock Wallace converted him to a striker. McClair went on to score 15 league goals in two seasons, including a hat-trick at Fir Park in a 3–0 win over Rangers on 3 January 1983, and both goals in a 2–1 win over Celtic eleven days later.

=== Celtic ===
In May 1983, Billy McNeill signed McClair for Celtic, for a fee of £100,000. McClair was effectively signed as a replacement for the recently departed Charlie Nicholas. However, McClair would never actually play for McNeill, as the Celtic manager resigned in June 1983 and was replaced by Davie Hay.

McClair scored in a 2–0 win on his debut against Partick Thistle at Firhill in the Glasgow Cup on 9 August 1983. By the end of an impressive first season at Celtic, McClair had scored 32 goals and established himself as a first team regular. A four-goal haul against Dundee in a 6–2 win during September, an outstanding solo goal in a 5–0 win over Sporting CP in the UEFA Cup, and a goal in the 3–2 extra time defeat against Rangers in the League Cup Final in March 1984 highlighted McClair's goalscoring ability.

The following season saw the arrival of Mo Johnston from Watford and, despite their contrasting personalities, McClair and Johnston would quickly form a deadly goalscoring partnership for Celtic. McClair continued to score regularly for Celtic, and at the end of the season won his first winner's medal, coming on as a substitute in Celtic's 2–1 win over Dundee United in the 1985 Scottish Cup Final.

Despite competition from Alan McInally and Mark McGhee, McClair and Johnston remained the regular pairing playing up front for Celtic. Their goals helped Celtic to a dramatic league championship win in 1985–86. This culminated in a memorable final-day 5–0 win over St Mirren at Love Street, with McClair and Johnston both scoring twice as title-rivals Hearts capitulated to a 2–0 defeat at Dundee.

The 1986–87 season was McClair's last at Celtic. Despite a bright start to the campaign from Celtic, the team's form began to fade during the winter months and they squandered a nine-point lead in the league, which was won by Rangers. Another League Cup final defeat against Rangers (despite an outstanding goal by McClair) and a fourth-round defeat at Hearts in the Scottish Cup saw Celtic finish the season without any silverware. Despite this collective disappointment, McClair was an outstanding success that year. He scored 41 goals in total to finish top scorer in the league with 35 goals, and won both the Scottish Football Writers' Association Player of the Year and the Scottish Players' Player of the Year awards.

In four seasons at Celtic, McClair made 204 appearances in all competitions and scored 126 goals. He won the Scottish Cup in 1985 and the Scottish Premier Division in 1986.

=== Manchester United ===
McClair joined Manchester United in July 1987 for a transfer fee of £850,000 that was determined by a tribunal. Celtic initially wanted £2 million for him, a fee which would have made him the most expensive player at the time to have signed for any British club, whilst Manchester United had offered only £400,000.

In his first season for Manchester United he scored 24 league goals, becoming the first Manchester United player to surpass 20 league goals in one season since George Best in the 1967–68 season. His first goal for Manchester United came in the third game of the season, a 2–0 home win over Watford. He then scored in the next game, a 3–1 away win over Charlton Athletic. He scored a brace in the 4–2 away win over Sheffield Wednesday on 10 October 1987, and another double in the late December win over defending champions Everton. He put a further double over Sheffield Wednesday in the March return game at Old Trafford, and scored a hat-trick against Derby County in early April. He managed further braces in the final two games of the season (against Portsmouth and Wimbledon). Only Liverpool's John Aldridge netted more First Division goals that season and, in all competitions, McClair scored a total of 31 goals. He could have had even more, but his late penalty miss at Arsenal in the FA Cup fifth round meant that Manchester United were eliminated with a 2–1 loss in what was a trophy-less season.

1988–89 was a difficult season for United after the progress made in 1987–88. Having spent his first year playing alongside Peter Davenport, McClair now found himself paired with returning hero Mark Hughes (back at Manchester United after two years abroad) and much was expected of the newly formed partnership. By the end of November, however, McClair had scored just twice in the league, whereas Hughes had found the net eight times, with Manchester United finding themselves in mid-table after a run of eight draws and one defeat. Results improved over the next couple of months as United crept to the fringes of the title challenge, but fell away in the final quarter of the season as the club finished 11th. McClair and Hughes both managed 16 goals in all competitions, with Hughes being the club's leading scorer in the league with 14 goals to McClair's 10.

Having scored in both the quarter-final and the replay of the semi-final, he was on the winning side as Manchester United won 1–0 over Crystal Palace in the 1990 FA Cup Final replay at Wembley on 17 May 1990, five days after drawing 3–3 in the first match. In the league, however, it had been a disappointing time for McClair as he scored just five goals and Manchester United finished 13th – their lowest finish since they were relegated from the top flight 16 years earlier. He was now facing competition from the promising young striker Mark Robins, who had scored 10 goals in 23 first team games that season.

He did however score the winning goal for Manchester United in the 1991 UEFA Super Cup against Red Star Belgrade, which followed his role in their European Cup Winners' Cup triumph over Barcelona. McClair had now won the fight to keep his place in the first team as he rediscovered his goalscoring touch and Robins was now struggling to get into the team.

In October 1990, McClair was involved in controversy when in reaction to a late challenge he repeatedly kicked Arsenal's Nigel Winterburn in the back as he lay prone on the ground, sparking a 21-man brawl. The two had a history, as Winterburn had been seen mocking McClair after his penalty miss in the FA Cup fifth round three seasons before. Manchester United had a point deducted for this episode, and Arsenal (who went on to be league champions that season) had two points docked.

In 1991–92, McClair scored the only goal in the 1992 League Cup Final against Nottingham Forest at Wembley. However, he missed out on a league title winner's medal as United's shortage of goals in the second half of the season cost them the championship, which was clinched by Leeds United. Alex Ferguson then made unsuccessful bids for strikers David Hirst and Alan Shearer, before signing Dion Dublin, who was bought as backup for McClair and Hughes.

Having been the main striker for Manchester United during his first season, and then partnered Mark Hughes when the Welshman returned from Barcelona, McClair was switched to a central midfield role when Eric Cantona joined United in November 1992. The casualty of this shift was the veteran midfielder Bryan Robson, who from this point onwards was mostly used as a substitute.

When Roy Keane was signed the following summer, McClair's first team opportunities became increasingly limited. He did, however, manage another cup final appearance and goal at Wembley, coming off the bench to score Manchester United's fourth goal as they beat Chelsea 4–0 in the 1994 FA Cup Final. He was rarely left out of the squad, often coming on as a substitute to play in midfield or attack. In 1993–94, the first season where he was no longer considered a first team regular, he appeared in 26 league games (though started just 12 of them) and scored one goal. In all competitions, he managed a total of six goals from 38 appearances (19 starts, 19 as a substitute). He had a much more active campaign in 1994–95, playing in all but two of the 42 league games, scoring five goals. In total, he played 53 games in all competitions and scored eight goals.

When squad numbers were introduced in the Premier League for its second season in 1993–94, McClair was issued with the number 9 shirt that had traditionally been his during the days of 1–11 shirt numbering. However, this number went to Andy Cole at the start of the 1996–97 season, after which McClair wore the number 13 shirt.

Despite his infrequent first team appearances, McClair opted to stay on at Manchester United as a squad player to provide reliable cover in midfield and attack, making, in 1994–95, over 40 appearances (in the first eleven or as a substitute). The following season, he featured in 22 league games, gaining him his third (of four) league winner's medal with the club. He was still receiving playing time in 1996–97, and on the first day of that season, McClair was credited with an assist for David Beckham's spectacular goal from the halfway line against Wimbledon. Later that year, McClair had a hand in another memorable goal, assisting Eric Cantona in his famous chipped goal on 21 December 1996 against Sunderland at Old Trafford. On 15 April 1997 a crowd of over 44,000, including an estimated 10,000 Celtic supporters, attended McClair's testimonial game against his former club Celtic at Old Trafford.

He scored a total of 127 goals for Manchester United, the last two coming against Coventry City in a 4–0 away league win on 22 November 1995, although he made some 60 first team appearances over the next two and a half years (mostly as a substitute). In eleven years at Old Trafford, he made a total of 471 appearances in all competitions. In later years, as his first team opportunities were reduced, McClair became something of a cult hero at Manchester United due to his Choccy's Diary being published in the official Manchester United magazine.

=== Motherwell ===
At the end of the 1997–98 season, McClair was given a free transfer to complete his playing days elsewhere. He accepted an offer to return to Motherwell, where he spent six months before announcing his retirement.

== International career ==
In international football, McClair won 30 caps for Scotland. He made his debut in November 1986 in a 3–0 win over Luxembourg at Hampden Park. The match was a qualifier for Euro 88, and McClair played in midfield behind his Celtic teammate and striker partner, Mo Johnston. Scotland failed to qualify for this tournament, but McClair became a regular in the Scotland squad for the next six years. He made five appearances for Scotland in the qualifiers for the 1990 World Cup. McClair also played for Scotland in a 'B' international against East Germany in April 1990 shortly before the 1990 World Cup. However, although Scotland qualified for this tournament, he failed to make manager Andy Roxburgh's 22-man squad.

Despite his omission, McClair continued to feature regularly for Scotland and represented his country at the 1992 European Championships, where he scored his first international goal in a 3–0 win over the CIS (formerly USSR). His final appearance for Scotland came in June 1993, when he scored the opening goal for Scotland in a 3–1 win over Estonia at Pittodrie.

== Management and coaching career ==
McClair returned south of the border in December 1998 to become Brian Kidd's assistant at Blackburn Rovers. But the pair were unable to prevent Blackburn from slipping out of the Premier League, and within a year, both had been sacked. He returned to Old Trafford as a youth team coach soon afterwards.

When Kidd first joined Blackburn after being assistant manager at Manchester United, McClair was one of several high-profile names to be linked with the assistant manager's vacancy at Old Trafford, as was former teammate Steve Bruce, who was then managing Sheffield United.

In 2001, McClair was appointed as Manchester United reserve team manager, and promptly won the Premier Reserve League in his first season as coach. In his second season, he was in charge of the Under-19 team which clinched the 2003 FA Youth Cup. Some players from that team, such as David Jones, Chris Eagles and Kieran Richardson, went on to make appearances in the first team.

At the end of the 2004–05 season, the first team finished trophyless, but the Reserve Teams headed by Ricky Sbragia, with McClair as his assistant, won an unprecedented quadruple of the Pontins' Holidays League, the FA Premier Reserve League, The Pontins' Holidays League Cup and the Premier Reserve League Playoff. Their quest for an unprecedented five trophies was thwarted when they lost to Manchester City in the Manchester Senior Cup.

After a year of shadowing Les Kershaw, McClair replaced him as the director of the Manchester United youth academy at the start of the 2006–07 season. His son, Liam, was once a member of the United academy.

McClair left Manchester United after being appointed by the Scottish Football Association in February 2015 as their national performance director, effective from 1 June 2015. McClair succeeded Mark Wotte, who resigned from the position in October 2014. McClair left the role in July 2016.

== Personal life ==
Though born in Bellshill, McClair was brought up in Airdrie and supported Airdrieonians as a child.

McClair has three children.

== Career statistics ==
=== Club ===
Appearances and goals by club, season and competition
Club	Season	League		National cup		League cup		Europe		Other (Note: Includes other competitive competitions, including the FA Community Shield and the Glasgow Cup)		Total	
Club	Season	Apps	Goals	Apps	Goals	Apps	Goals	Apps	Goals	Apps	Goals	Apps	Goals
Motherwell	1981–82	11	4	0	0	4	0	0	0	0	0	15	4
Motherwell	1982–83	29	11	2	1	6	4	0	0	0	0	37	16
Motherwell	Total	40	15	2	1	10	4	0	0	0	0	52	20
Celtic	1983–84	35	23	5	6	9	1	6	1	2	1	57	32
Celtic	1984–85	32	19	6	0	3	3	5	2	0	0	46	24
Celtic	1985–86	34	22	3	3	3	1	2	0	2	3	44	29
Celtic	1986–87	44	35	4	2	5	4	4	0	0	0	57	41
Celtic	Total	145	99	18	11	20	9	17	3	4	4	204	126
Manchester United	1987–88	40	24	3	2	5	5	0	0	0	0	48	31
Manchester United	1988–89	38	10	7	3	3	3	0	0	0	0	48	16
Manchester United	1989–90	37	5	8	3	3	0	0	0	0	0	48	8
Manchester United	1990–91	36	13	3	2	9	2	9	4	1	0	58	21
Manchester United	1991–92	42	18	3	1	8	4	5	2	0	0	58	25
Manchester United	1992–93	42	9	3	0	3	0	2	0	0	0	50	9
Manchester United	1993–94	26	1	5	1	7	4	0	0	0	0	38	6
Manchester United	1994–95	40	5	7	2	3	1	2	0	1	0	53	8
Manchester United	1995–96	22	3	0	0	1	0	0	0	0	0	23	3
Manchester United	1996–97	19	0	3	0	2	0	3	0	0	0	27	0
Manchester United	1997–98	13	0	3	0	1	0	3	0	0	0	20	0
Manchester United	Total	355	88	45	14	45	19	24	6	2	0	471	127
Motherwell	1998–99	11	0	0	0	2	0	0	0	0	0	13	0
Career total		551	202	65	26	77	32	41	9	6	4	740	273

=== International ===
Appearances and goals by national team and year
National team	Year	Apps	Goals
Scotland	1986	1	0
Scotland	1987	4	0
Scotland	1988	5	0
Scotland	1989	3	0
Scotland	1990	2	0
Scotland	1991	4	0
Scotland	1992	9	1
Scotland	1993	2	1
Total		30	2

Scores and results list Scotland's goal tally first, score column indicates score after each McClair goal

List of international goals scored by Brian McClair
No.	Date	Venue	Opponent	Score	Result	Competition
1	18 June 1992	Idrottsparken, Norrköping, Sweden	CIS	3–0	3–0	UEFA Euro 1992
2	1 June 1993	Pittodrie Stadium, Aberdeen, Scotland	Estonia	1–0	3–1	1994 FIFA World Cup qualification

== Honours ==
=== As a player ===
Celtic

- Scottish Premier Division: 1985–86
- Scottish Cup: 1984–85

Manchester United

- Premier League: 1992–93, 1993–94, 1995–96, 1996–97
- FA Cup: 1989–90, 1993–94
- Football League Cup: 1991–92; runner-up: 1990–91, 1993–94
- FA Charity Shield: 1990, 1993, 1994, 1996, 1997
- European Cup Winners' Cup: 1990–91
- European Super Cup: 1991

Individual

- Scottish Premier Division top scorer: 1983–84, 1986–87
- Daily Record Golden Shot: 1983–84, 1986–87
- European Bronze Boot: 1986–87
- PFA Scotland Players' Player of the Year: 1987
- SFWA Footballer of the Year: 1987
- Sir Matt Busby Player of the Year: 1987–88, 1991–92
- Alan Hardaker Trophy: 1992

=== As a manager ===
Manchester United Reserves

- Premier Reserve League North: 2001–02
