= Neil Whitworth =

English footballer

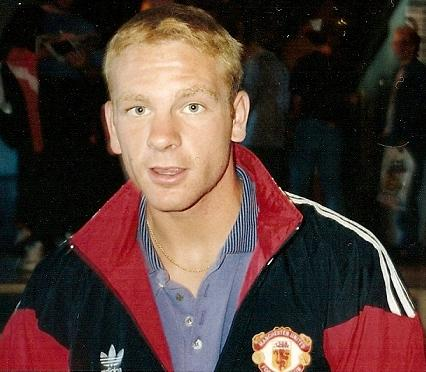

Personal information
- Full name: Neil Anthony Whitworth
- Date of birth: 12 April 1972 (age 54)
- Place of birth: Ince-in-Makerfield, England
- Height: 6 ft 2 in (1.88 m)
- Position: Centre-back

Youth career
- ?–1989: Wigan Athletic

Senior career*
Years	Team	Apps	(Gls)
1989–1990	Wigan Athletic	2	(0)
1990–1994	Manchester United	1	(0)
1992	→ Preston North End (loan)	6	(0)
1992	→ Barnsley (loan)	11	(0)
1993	→ Rotherham United (loan)	8	(1)
1993	→ Blackpool (loan)	3	(0)
1994–1998	Kilmarnock	75	(3)
1998	→ Wigan Athletic (loan)	8	(0)
1998–2000	Hull City	19	(2)
2000–2003	Exeter City	57	(1)
2003–2004	Southport	22	(0)
2003–2004	→ Radcliffe Borough (loan)	3	(0)
2006	Fleetwood Town	?	(?)
Total		215	(7)
- * Club domestic league appearances and goals

Neil Anthony Whitworth (born 12 April 1972) is an English former football defender.

Born in Ince-in-Makerfield, Wigan, to a former rugby league footballer, Whitworth began his career at Wigan Athletic as a trainee. He made his senior debut for Wigan on 10 February 1990 in a Third Division match against Leyton Orient; Wigan lost the match 2–0. Manchester United spotted Whitworth's potential and signed him for a fee of £45,000 in June 1990. His United debut came nine months later, when he played in a 1–1 draw away to Southampton. However, Whitworth did not play again for Manchester United and was shipped out on loan to four clubs before he and Colin McKee were sold to Kilmarnock for a combined fee of £350,000 in September 1994.

Whitworth first went on loan to Preston North End for a month in January 1992, playing six games for the Lancashire club. He then went to Barnsley in February 1992 until the end of the season, making 11 appearances. He played out the 1992–93 season in the Manchester United reserve team, but went on another month-long loan to Rotherham United in October 1993, immediately followed by a month at Blackpool.

Whitworth was issued with the number 32 shirt when the FA Premier League introduced squad numbers for the 1993–94 season, although he never took to the field in that shirt.

In 1997, Whitworth suffered a nasty bout of tuberculosis, and struggled to hold down a first-team place after his recovery. Towards the end of the 1997–98 season, he moved back to his home-town club, Wigan, on loan. Whitworth was released from his Kilmarnock contract at the end of May 1998, and immediately signed by Hull City. He stayed at Boothferry Park for two seasons, but only made 28 appearances in that time, before moving on to Exeter City. He stayed at Exeter for three years, making a total of 62 appearances. He was signed by Southport in August 2003, and formed a vital part of their defensive unit, despite attracting criticism from some quarters for his lack of aerial prowess. He was sent on a month's loan to Radcliffe Borough, before returning to Southport. However, at the end of the 2003–04 season, Whitworth decided to call time on his professional career. He made a brief comeback in 2006, playing a few games for Fleetwood Town but it was short-lived, and he has not played a professional game of football since.
