= Colin McKee =

Scottish footballer (born 1973)

Personal information
- Full name: Colin McKee
- Date of birth: 22 August 1973 (age 53)
- Place of birth: Glasgow, Scotland
- Height: 5 ft 10 in (1.78 m)
- Position: Forward

Youth career
- 1989–1992: Manchester United

Senior career*
| Years | Team | Apps | (Gls) |
| 1992–1994 | Manchester United | 1 | (0) |
| 1993 | → Bury (loan) | 2 | (0) |
| 1994–1997 | Kilmarnock | 76 | (12) |
| 1998 | Partick Thistle | 1 | (0) |
| 1998 | Falkirk | 4 | (0) |
| 1998–1999 | Queen of the South | 2 | (0) |
| 1999 | Ross County | 1 | (0) |
| 1999 | Stirling Albion | 2 | (0) |
| 1999 | → Víkingur (loan) | 8 | (0) |
| 2000 | Queen's Park | 7 | (0) |
| 2000–2001 | Fauldhouse United | ? | (?) |
| Total | | 105 | (12) |
- * Club domestic league appearances and goals

Colin McKee (born 22 August 1973) is a Scottish former footballer. His usual position was as a forward, but he was equally adept at playing on the wing.

== Career ==
McKee began his career at Manchester United, joining the club in 1989 after he was spotted playing for the Scotland schoolboys side. In 1992, he made the starting line-up for the FA Youth Cup final against Crystal Palace, along with future United stars such as Gary Neville, Nicky Butt, David Beckham and Ryan Giggs. United won the final 6–3 on aggregate, and McKee was offered a professional contract in August 1992.

He went on loan to Bury for a month in January 1993, making two appearances for the Shakers. He returned to Manchester United, winning the Denzil Haroun Reserve Team Player of the Year award in 1993, but struggled to break into the first team, making only one appearance before being sold to Kilmarnock in September 1994 along with Neil Whitworth in a combined deal worth £350,000.

On the creation of player squad numbers in the Premier League for the 1993–94 season, McKee was issued with the number 17 shirt, which became the property of the much more famous Andy Cole, who joined United from Newcastle four months after McKee's departure.

McKee stayed at Kilmarnock for three years, his longest stay at any club. He made 78 appearances for the club – two in the Scottish Cup – and scored twelve goals, all of which came in the league. However, he was released by Kilmarnock in October 1997.

Partick Thistle took him on a one-month trial in March 1998, but he failed to earn a contract with them and was allowed to leave. In June 1998, he signed for Falkirk, but only made four appearances for the club before being released yet again in October 1998.

He spent the rest of the 1998–99 season with two clubs; first he signed for Queen of the South, where he made two appearances, and then he moved to Ross County on a free transfer, making one more appearance before finding himself unattached again.

Summer 1999 saw McKee join his fifth club in two years when he put pen to paper for Stirling Albion, but yet again he made only two appearances before moving on to Queen's Park. He saw out the season with Queen's Park, making seven appearances for the Glasgow club, and then moved again, this time to Fauldhouse United. McKee retired from professional football soon after, calling time on a career that lasted twelve years and with ten clubs.

== Honours ==
Individual

- Denzil Haroun Reserve Team Player of the Year: 1992–93

== See also ==
- FA Youth Cup Final squads
