= 1993–94 FA Cup =

Tournament details
- Country: England; Wales

Final positions
- Champions: Manchester United (8th title)
- Runners-up: Chelsea

Tournament statistics
- Top goal scorer(s): Gavin Peacock (6 goals)

The 1993–94 FA Cup was the 113th staging of the world and England's oldest cup competition, the Football Association Cup or FA Cup. The competition overall was won by Manchester United for the first time since 1990, with a 4–0 defeat of Chelsea.

== Qualifying rounds ==
Most participating clubs that were not members of the Premier League or Football League competed in the qualifying rounds to secure one of 28 places available in the first round.

The winners from the fourth qualifying round were Witton Albion, Macclesfield Town, Accrington Stanley, Gretna, Knowsley United, Telford United, Leek Town, Stalybridge Celtic, Marine, Enfield, Slough Town, Cambridge City, Nuneaton Borough, Kettering Town, VS Rugby, Marlow, Yeading, Bromsgrove Rovers, Kidderminster Harriers, Gravesend & Northfleet, Molesey, Bath City, Metropolitan Police, Carshalton Athletic, Farnborough Town, Crawley Town, Weston-super-Mare and Sutton United.

Yeading and Molesey were appearing in the competition proper for the first time. Of the others, Stalybridge Celtic and Metropolitan Police had not featured at this stage since 1984–85, Gravesend & Northfleet had last done so in 1980-81, Knowsley United had last done so in 1969-70 (when the club had been known as Kirkby Town), Cambridge City had last done so in 1966-67 and Weston-super-Mare had last done so in 1961-62.

Bromsgrove Rovers competed in seven rounds of this season's tournament, defeating Gresley Rovers, Bedworth United, Solihull Borough and Rushden & Diamonds to qualify for the main draw. They then saw off Northampton Town and Yeovil Town before going out to First Division Barnsley in the third round.

== First round proper ==
Bolton Wanderers and West Bromwich Albion from the Football League First Division entered in this round along with the 46 Second and Third Division teams, the 28 non-league clubs from the qualifying rounds and Halifax Town, Runcorn, Woking and Yeovil Town who were given byes. Metropolitan Police, from the Isthmian League Second Division at Step 8 of English football, was the lowest-ranked team in the draw.

The first round matches were played on the weekend beginning 13 November 1993.

Tie no	Home team	Score	Away team
1	Enfield (6)	0–0	Cardiff City
replay	Cardiff City	1–0	Enfield
2	Chesterfield	0–1	Rochdale
3	AFC Bournemouth	4–2	Brighton & Hove Albion
4	Barnet	2–1	Carshalton Athletic (6)
5	Burnley	0–0	York City
replay	York City	2–3	Burnley
6	Yeovil Town (5)	1–0	Fulham
7	Woking (5)	2–2	Weston-super-Mare (7)
replay	Weston-super-Mare	0–1	Woking
8	Marlow (6)	0–2	Plymouth Argyle
9	Bolton Wanderers	3–2	Gretna (7)
10	Macclesfield Town (5)	2–0	Hartlepool United
11	Crewe Alexandra	4–2	Darlington
12	Scarborough	1–0	Bury
13	Shrewsbury Town	1–1	Doncaster Rovers
replay	Doncaster Rovers	1–2	Shrewsbury Town
14	Wrexham	1–1	Walsall
replay	Walsall	2–0	Wrexham
15	Kidderminster Harriers (5)	3–0	Kettering Town (5)
16	Bristol Rovers	1–2	Wycombe Wanderers
17	Northampton Town	1–2	Bromsgrove Rovers (5)
18	Bradford City	0–0	Chester City
replay	Chester City	1–0	Bradford City
19	Witton Albion (5)	0–2	Lincoln City
20	Mansfield Town	1–2	Preston North End
21	Port Vale	2–0	Blackpool
22	Halifax Town (5)	2–1	West Bromwich Albion
23	Stalybridge Celtic (5)	1–1	Marine (6)
replay	Marine	4–4	Stalybridge Celtic
Stalybridge Celtic won 4–2 on penalties
24	Runcorn (5)	0–2	Hull City
25	Metropolitan Police (8)	0–2	Crawley Town (6)
26	Rotherham United	1–2	Stockport County
27	Colchester United	3–4	Sutton United (6)
28	Leyton Orent	2–1	Gravesend & Northfleet (7)
29	Slough Town (5)	1–2	Torquay United
30	Cambridge City (6)	0–1	Hereford United
31	Cambridge United	0–0	Reading
replay	Reading	1–2	Cambridge United
32	Leek Town (6)	2–2	Wigan Athletic
replay	Wigan Athletic	3–0	Leek Town
33	Molesey (6)	0–4	Bath City (5)
34	Telford United (5)	1–1	Huddersfield Town
replay	Huddersfield Town	1–0	Telford United
35	Swansea City	1–1	Nuneaton Borough (6)
replay	Nuneaton Borough	2–1	Swansea City
36	Accrington Stanley (6)	2–3	Scunthorpe United
37	Farnborough Town (6)	1–3	Exeter City
38	VS Rugby (7)	0–3	Brentford
39	Yeading (6)	0–0	Gillingham
replay	Gillingham	3–1	Yeading
40	Knowsley United (6)	1–4	Carlisle United

== Second round proper ==
The second round matches were played on the weekend beginning 4 December 1993. The round featured three teams from Step 6 of the football pyramid: Nuneaton Borough and Crawley Town from the Southern League Premier Division, and Sutton United from the Isthmian League Premier Division.

Tie no	Home team	Score	Away team
1	Chester City	2–0	Hull City
2	AFC Bournemouth	1–1	Nuneaton Borough (6)
replay	Nuneaton Borough	0–1	AFC Bournemouth
3	Bath City (5)	2–1	Hereford United
4	Burnley	4–1	Rochdale
5	Yeovil Town (5)	0–2	Bromsgrove Rovers (5)
6	Walsall	1–1	Scunthorpe United
replay	Scunthorpe United	0–0	Walsall
Scunthorpe United won 7–6 on penalties
7	Crewe Alexandra	2–1	Macclesfield Town (5)
8	Lincoln City	1–3	Bolton Wanderers
9	Shrewsbury Town	0–1	Preston North End
10	Stockport County	5–1	Halifax Town (5)
11	Wycombe Wanderers	1–0	Cambridge United
12	Kidderminster Harriers (5)	1–0	Woking (5)
13	Brentford	1–3	Cardiff City
14	Plymouth Argyle	2–0	Gillingham
15	Carlisle United	3–1	Stalybridge Celtic (5)
16	Port Vale	1–0	Huddersfield Town
17	Torquay United	0–1	Sutton United (6)
18	Wigan Athletic	1–0	Scarborough
19	Leyton Orient	1–1	Exeter City
replay	Exeter City	2–2	Leyton Orient
Exeter City won 5–4 on penalties
20	Crawley Town (6)	1–2	Barnet

== Third round proper ==
Teams from the Premier League and First Division (except Bolton Wanderers and West Bromwich Albion) entered in this round. Sutton United was again the lowest-ranked team in the draw.

The third round matches were played on the weekend beginning 8 January 1994.

Tie no	Home team	Score	Away team
1	Bristol City (2)	1–1	Liverpool (1)
replay	Liverpool	0–1	Bristol City
2	Preston North End (4)	2–1	AFC Bournemouth (3)
3	Southampton (1)	1–1	Port Vale (3)
replay	Port Vale	1–0	Southampton
4	Notts County (2)	3–2	Sutton United (6)
5	Blackburn Rovers (1)	3–3	Portsmouth (2)
replay	Portsmouth	1–3	Blackburn Rovers
6	Sheffield Wednesday (1)	1–1	Nottingham Forest (2)
replay	Nottingham Forest	0–2	Sheffield Wednesday
7	Bolton Wanderers (2)	1–1	Everton (1)
replay	Everton	2–3	Bolton Wanderers
8	Grimsby Town (2)	1–0	Wigan Athletic (4)
9	Wolverhampton Wanderers (2)	1–0	Crystal Palace (2)
10	Sunderland (2)	1–1	Carlisle United (4)
replay	Carlisle United	0–1	Sunderland
11	Luton Town (2)	1–0	Southend United (2)
12	Swindon Town (1)	1–1	Ipswich Town (1)
replay	Ipswich Town	2–1	Swindon Town
13	Sheffield United (1)	0–1	Manchester United (1)
14	Stockport County (3)	2–1	Queens Park Rangers (1)
15	Newcastle United (1)	2–0	Coventry City (1)
16	Wycombe Wanderers (4)	0–2	Norwich City (1)
17	Manchester City (1)	4–1	Leicester City (2)
18	West Ham United (1)	2–1	Watford (2)
19	Plymouth Argyle (3)	1–0	Chester City (4)
20	Millwall (2)	0–1	Arsenal (1)
21	Oldham Athletic (1)	2–1	Derby County (2)
22	Barnet (3)	0–0	Chelsea (1)
replay	Chelsea	4–0	Barnet
23	Wimbledon (1)	3–0	Scunthorpe United (4)
24	Exeter City (3)	0–1	Aston Villa (1)
25	Cardiff City (3)	2–2	Middlesbrough (2)
replay	Middlesbrough	1–2	Cardiff City
26	Bromsgrove Rovers (5)	1–2	Barnsley (2)
27	Charlton Athletic (2)	3–0	Burnley (3)
28	Leeds United (1)	3–1	Crewe Alexandra (4)
29	Stoke City (2)	0–0	Bath City (5)
replay	Bath City	1–4	Stoke City
30	Peterborough United (2)	1–1	Tottenham Hotspur (1)
replay	Tottenham Hotspur	1–1	Peterborough United
Tottenham Hotspur won 5–4 on penalties
31	Birmingham City (2)	1–2	Kidderminster Harriers (5)
32	Oxford United (2)	2–0	Tranmere Rovers (2)

== Fourth round proper ==
The fourth round matches were played on the weekend beginning 29 January 1994. Kidderminster Harriers, from the Football Conference (Step 5) was the lowest-ranked team in the draw.

Tie no	Home team	Score	Away team
1	Notts County	1–1	West Ham United
replay	West Ham United	1–0	Notts County
2	Bolton Wanderers	2–2	Arsenal
replay	Arsenal	1–3	Bolton Wanderers
3	Grimsby Town	1–2	Aston Villa
4	Ipswich Town	3–0	Tottenham Hotspur
5	Stockport County	0–4	Bristol City
6	Newcastle United	1–1	Luton Town
replay	Luton Town	2–0	Newcastle United
7	Kidderminster Harriers (5)	1–0	Preston North End
8	Norwich City	0–2	Manchester United
9	Plymouth Argyle	2–2	Barnsley
replay	Barnsley	1–0	Plymouth Argyle
10	Oldham Athletic	0–0	Stoke City
replay	Stoke City	0–1	Oldham Athletic
11	Chelsea	1–1	Sheffield Wednesday
replay	Sheffield Wednesday	1–3	Chelsea
12	Wimbledon	2–1	Sunderland
13	Cardiff City	1–0	Manchester City
14	Port Vale	0–2	Wolverhampton Wanderers
15	Charlton Athletic	0–0	Blackburn Rovers
replay	Blackburn Rovers	0–1	Charlton Athletic
16	Oxford United	2–2	Leeds United
replay	Leeds United	2–3	Oxford United

== Fifth round proper ==
The fifth round matches were played on the weekend beginning 19 February 1994.

Kidderminster Harriers was again the lowest-ranked team in the draw and the last non-league club in the competition. Harriers would go on to win the Football Conference championship, but they were to be controversially denied promotion to the Third Division after the Football League introduced new stadium tenure and capacity regulations in the wake of the demise of Maidstone United during the previous season. Harriers' ground, Aggborough was deemed to be of insufficient capacity to host Football League fixtures.

Tie no	Home team	Score	Away team
1	Bristol City	1–1	Charlton Athletic
replay	Charlton Athletic	2–0	Bristol City
2	Bolton Wanderers	1–0	Aston Villa
3	Wolverhampton Wanderers	1–1	Ipswich Town
replay	Ipswich Town	1–2	Wolverhampton Wanderers
4	Kidderminster Harriers (5)	0–1	West Ham United
5	Oldham Athletic	1–0	Barnsley
6	Wimbledon	0–3	Manchester United
7	Cardiff City	1–2	Luton Town
8	Oxford United	1–2	Chelsea

== Sixth round proper ==
Oldham Athletic reached the FA Cup semi-finals for the second time in five seasons, where they would meet their opponents from 1990 – Manchester United.

Luton reached their first semi-final since 1988 at the expense of West Ham United, where they would take on Chelsea.

12 March 1994
15:00

Bolton Wanderers	0–1	Oldham Athletic
		Beckford 84'

Burnden Park, Bolton
Attendance: 20,321
Referee: Kelvin Morton (Bury St. Edmunds)

12 March 1994
15:00

Manchester United	3–1	Charlton Athletic
Hughes 46'; Kanchelskis 72', 76'		Leaburn 77'

Old Trafford, Manchester
Attendance: 44,347
Referee: Robbie Hart (Darlington)

13 March 1994
14:00

Chelsea	1–0	Wolverhampton Wanderers
Peacock 58'

Stamford Bridge, London
Attendance: 29,340
Referee: Graham Poll (Tring)

14 March 1994
19:45

West Ham United	0–0	Luton Town

Upton Park, West Ham, London
Attendance: 27,331
Referee: Brian Hill (Kettering)

23 March 1994
19:45

Luton Town	3–2	West Ham United
Oakes 36', 48', 74'		M. Allen 30'; Bishop 57'

Kenilworth Road, Luton
Attendance: 13,166

== Semi-finals ==
The semi-final paired Premier League leaders Manchester United with relegation-threatened Oldham Athletic - a repeat of the 1990 semi-final. Wembley Stadium was the venue for this match, which was still goalless after 90 minutes. Oldham took the lead in extra time through Neil Pointon, and held their lead the 119th minute, when a late equaliser by Mark Hughes forced a replay. The two sides met at Maine Road for the replay, which United won 4–1 to end their opposition's hopes of a first-ever FA Cup final, and move closer to winning the double.

The other semi-final paired Premier League side Chelsea with Division One side Luton Town, with both sides looking for glory in the cup after disappointing league campaigns. Like the other semi-final the following day, this match was played at Wembley. Chelsea went through with Gavin Peacock scoring twice in a 2–0 win, to reach their first FA Cup final for 24 years.

9 April 1994

Chelsea	2–0	Luton Town
Peacock 13', 48'	Report

Wembley Stadium, London
Referee: Roger Dilkes (Mossley)
10 April 1994

Manchester United	1 – 1 (a.e.t)	Oldham Athletic
Hughes 120'		Pointon 106'

Wembley Stadium, London
Referee: Philip Don (Hanworth Park, Middlesex)

=== Replay ===
13 April 1994

Manchester United	4–1	Oldham Athletic
Irwin 10'; Kanchelskis 15'; Robson 62'; Giggs 67'	Report	Pointon 40'

Maine Road, Manchester
Referee: Martin Bodenham (East Looe, Cornwall)

== Final ==
Two penalties by Eric Cantona as well as late goals by Mark Hughes and Brian McClair gave Manchester United a 4–0 triumph over Chelsea after the deadlock was still unbroken at half-time, and saw them become only the sixth club in history to win The Double.

14 May 1994
15:00 BST

Chelsea	0–4	Manchester United
		Cantona 60' (pen.) 66' (pen.); Hughes 69'; McClair 90'

Wembley Stadium, London
Attendance: 79,634
Referee: David Elleray (London)

Chelsea	Manchester United

== Media coverage ==
For the sixth consecutive season in the United Kingdom, the BBC were the free to air broadcasters while Sky Sports were the subscription broadcasters.

The matches shown live on the BBC were:

• Sheffield United 0-1 Manchester United (R3)

• Norwich City 0-2 Manchester United (R4)

• Bolton Wanderers 1-0 Aston Villa (R5)

• Chelsea 1-0 Wolverhampton Wanderers (QF)

• Oldham Athletic 1-1 Manchester United (SF)

• Chelsea 0-4 Manchester United (Final)

The matches shown live on Sky Sports were:

• Halifax Town 2-1 West Bromwich Albion (R1)

• Yeovil Town 1-0 Fulham (R1)

• Walsall 2-0 Wrexham (R1 Replay)

• Lincoln City 1-3 Bolton Wanderers (R2)

• Bath City 2-1 Hereford United (R2)

• Nuneaton Borough 0-1 AFC Bournemouth (R2 Replay)

• Millwall 0-1 Arsenal (R3)

• Nottingham Forest 0-2 Sheffield Wednesday (R3 Replay)

• Bolton Wanderers 2-2 Arsenal (R4)

• Luton Town 2-0 Newcastle United (R4 Replay)

• Wimbledon 0-3 Manchester United (R5)

• Ipswich Town 1-2 Wolverhampton Wanderers (R5 Replay)

• West Ham United 0-0 Luton Town (QF)

• Luton Town 3-2 West Ham United (QF Replay)

• Chelsea 2-0 Luton Town (SF)

• Manchester United 4-1 Oldham Athletic (SF Replay)
