= David May (footballer) =

English footballer and coach (born 1970)

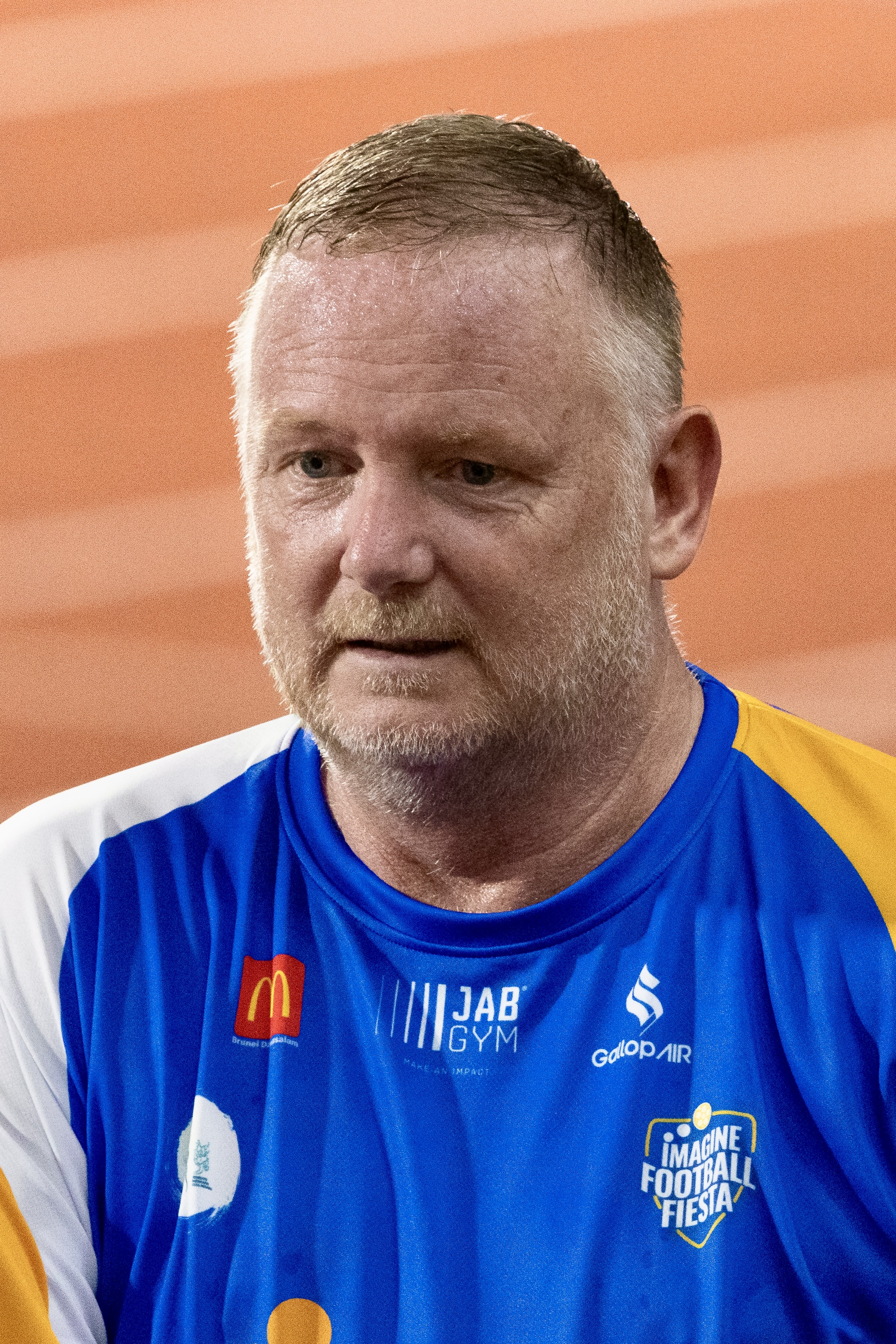
- May in 2024

Personal information
- Full name: David May
- Date of birth: 24 June 1970 (age 56)
- Place of birth: Oldham, England
- Height: 6 ft 0 in (1.83 m)
- Positions: Centre-back; right-back

Youth career
- –1988: Blackburn Rovers

Senior career*
Years	Team	Apps	(Gls)
1988–1994	Blackburn Rovers	123	(3)
1994–2003	Manchester United	85	(6)
1999–2000	→ Huddersfield Town (loan)	1	(0)
2003–2004	Burnley	35	(4)
2004–2006	Bacup Borough		
Total		244	(13)
- * Club domestic league appearances and goals

David May (born 24 June 1970) is an English football coach and former professional footballer. As a player, May was a centre-back and right-back from 1988 to 2006. He played in the Premier League for Blackburn Rovers and Manchester United, collecting numerous trophies in a nine-year spell at Old Trafford that included two Premier League titles, two FA Cups and the UEFA Champions League.

May went on to play in the Football League for Huddersfield Town and Burnley before finishing his career with non-League club Bacup Borough.

== Playing career ==
=== Blackburn Rovers ===
May started his career with Blackburn Rovers as a trainee before graduating to the first team in the 1988–89 season, mostly playing as a right-back but sometimes playing at centre-back. He made over 100 appearances for the club and was a regular player in the Blackburn team which was promoted to the new Premier League in 1992 and finished as runners-up to Manchester United in the 1993–94 season, having finished fourth a year earlier. May retained his regular place in the Blackburn team after they reached the Premier League, despite the many millions that manager Kenny Dalglish spent on rebuilding the squad ready for a title challenge.

=== Manchester United ===
In July 1994, Manchester United bought May for £1.2 million, as he was apparently unhappy at Blackburn in his final months due to the breakdown in contract negotiations. Manchester United manager Alex Ferguson had been searching for a defender to add to the squad, and specifically needed an Englishman who would not be affected by the restrictions on foreign players in European competition that were in place at the time. He was also thinking about the future, as centre-back and captain Steve Bruce was in his 34th year and Gary Pallister was approaching 30.

Injuries to first-choice right-back Paul Parker meant that May was often used as a right-back in his first season, and rarely played in his preferred centre-back position due to the strong partnership of Bruce and Pallister. As May underperformed, by the end of the season, Gary Neville had emerged to become the new first-choice right-back, while Parker was rarely used the following season and then left the club.

Manchester United finished the season in second place in the Premier League, losing out to May's old club Blackburn Rovers.

May finally managed to establish himself in the team towards the end of the 1995–96 season as an understudy for Bruce, who was struggling with a hamstring injury, and scored the first goal in the final match of the season against Middlesbrough. The 3–0 victory clinched the title for Manchester United. He was also in the starting line-up for the 1996 FA Cup Final victory over Liverpool, while Bruce was not even selected as a substitute.

Bruce departed to Birmingham City soon after, and May became a regular starter in the 1996–97 season, making over 40 appearances and often being paired with Gary Pallister, although a third centre-back, new signing Ronny Johnsen, had been signed in the summer of 1996 and was a regular in the first team. His contributions were important as United retained the league title and also reached the semi-final of the Champions League after a 4–0 victory over Porto in the quarter-final, in which May scored the first goal. His form meant that he received a late call-up to the England national team for a friendly against Mexico, but he never actually won an international cap.

The purchases of Henning Berg and Jaap Stam, as well as the emergence of Wes Brown, limited his chances further during the late 1990s and he saw very little action with the first team. However, towards the end of the treble-winning 1998–99 season, May enjoyed a brief comeback as Ferguson rotated his squad to cope with the mounting fixture congestion and United were challenging for the league title, FA Cup and European Cup. He was also named in the starting line-up for the 1999 FA Cup Final as Stam was being rested for the Champions League Final against Bayern Munich. May was named on the bench for that match, and is remembered for the way he led the celebrations after the match, despite not playing one single minute in the Champions League that season. A popular chant with the crowd was "David May, superstar! Got more medals than Shearer!" – in reference to the lack of success enjoyed by May's former Blackburn colleague Alan Shearer, who was one of the finest strikers of his generation but won just one trophy in a career which lasted nearly twenty years at the highest level.

The following season, May was loaned out to Huddersfield Town, where he played under Steve Bruce. In his first appearance for the Terriers, however, he picked up an injury and had to return for treatment to Old Trafford, where he remained for another three years, but was often sidelined by injury and played mainly in the reserve team. May's last four seasons with United saw him make only 12 appearances in total for the club. Due to his lack of appearances, May collected only two Premier League winner's medals, despite being a squad member for six winning campaigns. May's final competitive appearance for Manchester United came in the League Cup on 3 December 2002 against Burnley.

=== Burnley ===
At the end of his contract with Manchester United in the summer of 2003, May was given a free transfer and snapped up by Burnley manager Stan Ternent, an old friend of Ferguson's, to bolster his leaky defence. In September 2003, he scored in a 2–1 win against Stoke City, while at the end of the month he was sent off against Wimbledon for two yellow cards.

In December 2003, May was headbutted by Ternent following a disagreement at the club training ground. They later settled their differences.

He played 39 times for Burnley during the 2003–04 season, and captained the team on a number of occasions.

=== Bacup Borough ===
May joined non-League club Bacup Borough in November 2004 where he finished his playing career.

== Coaching career ==
After retiring as a player with Bacup Borough, May was appointed as assistant manager at the club. In 2007, he moved to Dubai to coach football at a school.

== Personal life ==
May was born in Oldham, Lancashire.

Since retiring May has become a wine importer. He is still a keen supporter of former club Manchester United, although he grew up supporting Manchester City. As of 2007, he was a regular presenter of Thursday Focus on MUTV, his old club's TV station. May is also co-host of The Official Manchester United Podcast.

== Honours ==
Blackburn Rovers

- Football League Second Division play-offs: 1992

Manchester United

- Premier League: 1995–96, 1996–97
- FA Cup: 1995–96, 1998–99
- FA Charity Shield: 1994, 1996
- UEFA Champions League: 1998–99
