= 1997–98 Manchester United F.C. season =

English football club season

Manchester United
1997–98 season
- Chairman: Martin Edwards
- Manager: Alex Ferguson
- Premier League: 2nd
- FA Cup: Fifth round
- League Cup: Third round
- UEFA Champions League: Quarter-finals
- Charity Shield: Winners
- Top goalscorer: League: Andy Cole (15); All: Andy Cole (25)
- Highest home attendance: 55,306 vs Wimbledon (28 March 1998)
- Lowest home attendance: 41,027 vs Everton (26 December 1997)
- Average home league attendance: 54,420
Home colours	Away colours	Third colours

The 1997–98 season was Manchester United's sixth season in the Premier League, and their 23rd consecutive season in the top division of English football. The campaign ended poorly, having been pipped to the Premier League title by Arsenal, who managed a ten-match winning streak in the last two months of the season, as well as being eliminated by league strugglers Barnsley and French outfit AS Monaco in the FA Cup Fifth Round and UEFA Champions League Quarter-Finals respectively. To make matters worse, United entered March still in contention for a League and European double after opening up a 12-point gap, regardless of the fact that nearest challengers Arsenal had three games in hand. Thus, the season ended with only the Charity Shield in the cabinet.

Following the loss of captain and star striker, Eric Cantona at the end of the previous season, Ferguson acquired the services of England international Teddy Sheringham as a direct replacement on a three-year deal from Tottenham Hotspur for £3.5 million. Cantona's departure meant that Roy Keane was promoted as captain and a reshuffle of squad numbers occurred; David Beckham was awarded the coveted number 7 shirt and Sheringham was given Beckham's former squad number 10. Henning Berg was the only other new face to arrive at Old Trafford from Blackburn Rovers for a £5 million fee at the start of the season.

== Pre-season and friendlies ==
Date	Opponents	H/A	Result F–A	Scorers	Attendance
17 July 1997	Thailand	A	2–0	Butt 55', Natee 86' (o.g.)	38,000
20 July 1997	South China	A	1–0	Cruyff 57'	36,611
22 July 1997	Urawa Red Diamonds	A	2–1	Solskjær (2) 13', 39'	17,642
27 July 1997	Internazionale	A^{[A]}	1–1 (1–4p)	Butt 22'	49,718
30 July 1997	Internazionale	H	1–1	Clegg 67'	48,579
5 August 1997	Slavia Prague	H	2–2	Poborský 1', Cooke 45'	22,075
5 October 1997	Manchester City	A	2–2	Scholes 9', Notman 84'	21,262

Colours: Green = Manchester United win; Yellow = draw; Red = opponents win.

== FA Charity Shield ==
Manchester United faced FA Cup winners Chelsea in the season's annual curtain raiser, the FA Charity Shield. The Premiership champions won the match 4–2 on penalties after both teams produced a 1–1 draw after 90 minutes.

Date	Opponents	H/A	Result F–A	Scorers	Attendance
3 August 1997	Chelsea	N	1–1 (4–2p)	Johnsen 57'	73,636

Colours: Green = Manchester United win; Yellow = draw; Red = opponents win.

== FA Premier League ==
=== August–October ===
Manchester United started their campaign to win an unprecedented third straight title at White Hart Lane — Teddy Sheringham's former stomping ground. An hour into his debut presented him with a chance to score from a dubious penalty, but he hit the post and blasted the rebound wide. What seemed like a pulsating draw turned out to be business as usual for the champions, who scored twice in the last ten minutes from a Nicky Butt strike and an own goal by hapless defender Ramon Vega. David Beckham came off the bench to grab the winner against Southampton to ensure United remained in the driving seat and despite a lacklustre goalless draw to Leicester at Filbert Street, they managed a third straight clean sheet. Beckham kept up his ever-improving goal-scoring record while Sheringham poached his first goal for the club as Ferguson's all-conquering United dismantled Everton at Goodison Park. At home to Coventry, Andy Cole marked his return from minor surgery with a goal inside 73 seconds that left goalkeeper, Steve Ogrizovic completely bamboozled. Keane and Poborský added to the rout, which Ferguson and Coventry boss Gordon Strachan mutually agreed was a "flattering scoreline". The champions set the benchmark in August with five straight clean sheets and eight goals leaving them joint top with Blackburn Rovers. In such commanding form, pundits alike reckoned that it was a matter of time before they would resume their domestic supremacy.

West Ham took some heart in their performance at Old Trafford by scoring the opening goal, thus breaking United's clean sheet record. The champions responded in typical fashion, scoring twice in both halves of the match to win a third on the trot and give Ferguson the perfect boost ahead of their midweek Champions League tie. Although victorious away to Košice, United couldn't break the deadlock in their next league match to Bolton, squandering numerous chances to remain at the top of the table, most notably from Andy Cole. The main talking point at the Reebok Stadium came in the 35th minute, when a brawl between Nathan Blake and Gary Pallister resulted in both players being controversially sent off. After the game, a furious Ferguson personally sent a video of the incident to The Football Association in the hope of the decision being rescinded. Referee Paul Durkin publicly admitted before the video arrived that, in hindsight, he had made the wrong decision. Mark Hughes returned to Old Trafford and scored what looked to be the winner for Chelsea, before super-sub Ole Gunnar Solskjær popped in to earn a dramatic equaliser with four minutes to go. A first-half header from Leeds defender David Wetherall was enough to condemn United to their first defeat of the season and first in almost three months of football. Worse was to come for the champions, as captain Roy Keane was ruled out for the rest of the season with knee ligament damage, although Ferguson revealed after the Leeds match that they hoped that he would be fit enough to play some part in their next Champions League game, at home to Juventus on the coming Wednesday. Schmeichel was placed as captain in his absence.

Crystal Palace met Manchester United in the first week of October, looking to capitalise on their defeat to Leeds. Ferguson had anticipated that their midweek triumph at home to Italian giants Juventus would act as the "spark" to their league form. A 2–0 win – their first in four attempts – put them a point behind league leaders Arsenal. The first ever sell-out game at Derby's new £20 million Pride Park stadium saw the home side take a commanding 2–0 lead through Paulo Wanchope and Francesco Baiano. A third defeat in five games was on the cards for Alex Ferguson's side after Teddy Sheringham missed his second penalty of the season, but he quickly made amends, connecting his head with Gary Neville's inch-perfect cross. Cole, who was dropped from the first team for the Champions League tie at home to Feyenoord, came on with fifteen minutes of normal time remaining and grabbed a vital equaliser, drilling a low shot past the wretched Derby defence. Old Trafford welcomed Barnsley for the first time in over 60 years and a rampant United display helped them leapfrog Arsenal to the top of the Premiership for the first time since early September. Andy Cole bagged a first half hat-trick and Scholes, Ryan Giggs (2) and Poborský followed up with goals in a breathtaking performance that gave the Tykes their ninth league defeat of the season.

=== November–February ===
Fergie's fledglings began November in the same fashion they ended the previous month – with a rout. Sheringham, Cole and Solskjær all scored twice each at home to Sheffield Wednesday, in a game that they could have scored so many more. David Pleat managed to get sympathy from Ferguson who admitted "every shot United had in the first half went in" but not from the board, cumulating in his sacking the following Monday. The talk of a one-horse race for the Premiership was put on hold after defeat to Arsenal at Highbury. The psychological impact of United opening up a seven-point lead had they won would have been too much ground to make up for the challengers. Arsenal manager Arsène Wenger admitted before the game that defeat would make it "difficult for them" to catch up on United's ground but not "impossible". The Gunners put themselves in front with Nicolas Anelka's first goal for the club and Patrick Vieira's swooping shot which left Schmeichel rattled. Sheringham's admirable brace just before half time left the match finely poised but former United trainee David Platt headed into the far corner with seven minutes left. Thumping Wimbledon courtesy of a Beckham brace and goals from Cole, Scholes and Butt was the perfect response after their second defeat of the season and United bettered it at home to Blackburn Rovers, the only team with an unbeaten away record. A 4–0 win ensured distance between themselves and the challengers, popping the question as to which team was capable of stopping them. The Red Devils managed to score 30 goals in the last nine fixtures prior to this game and qualification to the quarter finals of the Champions League meant that they could prolong their rich domestic goal-scoring form. Ferguson understandably quashed any sort of hype, but admitted that they were in an "ideal position", in comparison to the same point in the last season.

An early morning kick-off away to fierce rivals Liverpool ended in a routine victory for United. Losing to Juventus in the last match of the Champions League before hiatus had seemed to have no effect on United's domestic dominance. They comprehensively defeated Aston Villa thanks to a solitary Giggs goal and followed it up with a heroic Schmeichel performance to deny Newcastle United at St James' Park. British Prime Minister Tony Blair, a lifelong fan of the Geordies, was among the crowd and was in awe over Ferguson's team, believing that the manager had assembled "one of the greatest sides of the century". Two out of two became three as Everton found no answer to deny the league leaders, who extended their lead at the top of the table to six points on Boxing Day. The win marked the end of Karel Poborský's spell, coming on for David Beckham in the second half ahead of a switch to Graeme Souness' Benfica. However, what was to come at the end of December exemplified the vulnerability of the defence during the second half of the season. In losing to mid-table Coventry City two days after the Everton win, United blew the chance to open up a nine-point lead at the top of the table, which would virtually slam the door shut on the challengers. They again found themselves a goal down, this time courtesy of Noel Whelan, Solskjær and Sheringham responded to restore the advantage back on the champions but a Dion Dublin penalty and mazy run from youngster Darren Huckerby in the last minute ensured an implausible victory, given the fact that Coventry were 2–1 down with five minutes to go. Prior to the game, Ferguson highlighted the fact that the league "wasn't won in December", but following the defeat blasted his side's display as "silly" and "on the verge of complacency".

As 1997 turned to 1998, an inspirational performance from Giggs helped a modest United side labour for a hard-earned three points and still maintain their desire for a fifth title in six seasons. A trip to the Dell to play Southampton – where United were undone last season repeated itself, this time by a solitary Kevin Davies goal in the third minute. The Saints pulled off a valiant performance, most notably from goalkeeper Paul Jones, who denied Solskjær from scoring right at the death of the second half. Things went from bad to worse in January as Tony Cottee popped in to stun Old Trafford and score the winner for Leicester in what proved a wretched season for the striker. This was the Foxes first win in the league since November and United's first home defeat of the season and fifth altogether.

7 February marked the visit of Bolton Wanderers to Old Trafford on the 40th anniversary of the Munich air disaster, which killed seven United players, eight sports journalists and several club officials. Having gone a goal down to Bob Taylor's scrappy shot that bamboozled Gary Neville and Schmeichel, Andy Cole struck in a late equaliser with five minutes to go. In injury time, Gary Neville connected with a floating corner provided by Beckham, only for it to ricochet off the crossbar. Although they gained a point, United increased their lead due to their contenders' inability to close the gap. They typically left it late to snatch the three points in their next match – away to Aston Villa – but followed it up against Derby County with a somewhat polished 2–0 victory. The only drawback that came out of the match was a hamstring injury suffered by Giggs that ruled him out of the FA Cup replay away to Barnsley and remained serious doubt for first leg of the Champions League quarter-final at Monaco. Giggs joined Scholes and Keane on the injury list, who both had knee injuries. Another early morning kick-off had meant United had the chance to open up an 11-point lead at the top of the table if they could beat Chelsea at Stamford Bridge. They did via a rare goal from Phil Neville, which also ended the Blues' title challenge. Although Arsenal had three games in hand, a third successive title was within United's grasp.

=== March–May ===
Ferguson's target of achieving an unassailable lead in the Premiership was coming into fruition. United managed to gain 22 points out of a possible 33 over the winter, in spite of the absence of first team regulars. Such a massive gap between themselves and the chasing pack with ten games remaining was enough for Manchester bookmaker Fred Done to pay out on punters who backed the champions in retaining their crown. Within several hours, £17,000 had been snapped up, irrespective if a late challenger had emerged. Drawing away to AS Monaco gave them a slender but crucial outcome but a shock defeat at the hands of Sheffield Wednesday prevented them from opening up a 14-point advantage. The league leaders' dismal run continued; Paul Scholes scored his first goal in over four months to salvage a point at Upton Park. On the same night, Arsenal sealed a 1–0 win against Wimbledon to close the gap on United and set up a frantic contest between the top two on the Saturday. A late surge from the Gunners also reopened betting for the Premiership title race, much to the delight of Arsène Wenger. Leading up to the potential championship decider, Ferguson was adamant that a win would just about seal this title. After numerous attempts to break the deadlock in the match, Arsenal finally managed to score with 15 minutes left; Marc Overmars latched onto an Anelka header coming from a long ball and used his agility to flick it beyond the goalkeeper to give Arsenal the all-important lead and win. Peter Schmeichel, who was in agony in the closing stages was ruled out for the Monaco encounter on Wednesday with a hamstring injury. When asked which team was in the best position going into the finishing straight of the season, Wenger admitted to the press that United had a "small advantage" over the rest. Ferguson, however was bullish with his side's downturn and warned that it would be "inevitable" for Arsenal to lose points.

Elimination to Monaco through the away goals ruling ended United's run in the European Cup but they showed their championship credentials, scoring twice late on at home to Wimbledon and extending their lead via thumping Blackburn. However, it left Arsenal six points behind with three games in hand. Liverpool frustrated the leaders on Good Friday, holding out for a draw after teenage sensation Michael Owen had been sent off by the referee for a double bookable offence in the 40th minute. Another draw, this time to Newcastle meant that Arsenal moved to the top of the table for the first time since October, having thrashed Blackburn 4–1 and Wimbledon 5–0 respectively. United moved to within a point on Monday night after relegating Crystal Palace but Ferguson confessed only "a total collapse" would prevent the title heading towards North London.

By the time United kicked off their final home game of the season, Arsenal had recorded a tenth straight league victory at home to Everton and ensured their status as champions for the first time in seven years. Frenchman Arsène Wenger also became the first foreign manager to get his hands on the coveted trophy since its inception, in only his first full campaign. He completed a double three weeks later by winning the FA Cup, regarded by many fans and pundits alike as unthinkable given the circumstances four months ago.

The Red Devils signed off their disappointing campaign on a high at home to Leeds and a comfortable victory away to the already relegated Barnsley. Alex Ferguson vowed to regain the trophy next season and promised a whole host of new signings, starting with Dutch defender, Jaap Stam.

Date	Opponents	H/A	Result F–A	Scorers	Attendance	League position
10 August 1997	Tottenham Hotspur	A	2–0	Butt 82', Vega 83' (o.g.)	26,359	1st
13 August 1997	Southampton	H	1–0	Beckham 79'	55,008	2nd
23 August 1997	Leicester City	A	0–0		21,221	3rd
27 August 1997	Everton	A	2–0	Beckham 29', Sheringham 50'	40,079	2nd
30 August 1997	Coventry City	H	3–0	Cole 2', Keane 72', Poborský 90'	55,074	2nd
13 September 1997	West Ham United	H	2–1	Keane 21', Scholes 75'	55,068	1st
20 September 1997	Bolton Wanderers	A	0–0		25,000	1st
24 September 1997	Chelsea	H	2–2	Scholes 35', Solskjær 86'	55,163	2nd
27 September 1997	Leeds United	A	0–1		39,952	2nd
4 October 1997	Crystal Palace	H	2–0	Sheringham 18', Hreiðarsson 30' (o.g.)	55,143	2nd
18 October 1997	Derby County	A	2–2	Sheringham 51', Cole 83'	30,014	3rd
25 October 1997	Barnsley	H	7–0	Cole (3) 17', 19', 45', Giggs (2) 43', 57', Scholes 59', Poborský 80'	55,142	1st
1 November 1997	Sheffield Wednesday	H	6–1	Sheringham (2) 13', 63', Newsome 20' (o.g.), Cole 39', Solskjær (2) 41', 75'	55,259	1st
9 November 1997	Arsenal	A	2–3	Sheringham (2) 33', 40'	38,205	1st
22 November 1997	Wimbledon	A	5–2	Butt 48', Beckham (2) 67', 75', Scholes 81', Cole 85'	26,309	1st
30 November 1997	Blackburn Rovers	H	4–0	Solskjær (2) 17', 52', Henchoz 59' (o.g.), Kenna 84' (o.g.)	55,175	1st
6 December 1997	Liverpool	A	3–1	Cole (2) 51', 74', Beckham 70'	41,027	1st
15 December 1997	Aston Villa	H	1–0	Giggs 52'	55,151	1st
21 December 1997	Newcastle United	A	1–0	Cole 67'	36,767	1st
26 December 1997	Everton	H	2–0	Berg 14', Cole 35'	41,027	1st
28 December 1997	Coventry City	A	2–3	Solskjær 31', Sheringham 48'	23,054	1st
10 January 1998	Tottenham Hotspur	H	2–0	Giggs (2) 44', 68'	55,281	1st
19 January 1998	Southampton	A	0–1		15,241	1st
31 January 1998	Leicester City	H	0–1		55,156	1st
7 February 1998	Bolton Wanderers	H	1–1	Cole 85'	55,156	1st
18 February 1998	Aston Villa	A	2–0	Beckham 83', Giggs 89'	39,372	1st
21 February 1998	Derby County	H	2–0	Giggs 19', Irwin 71' (pen.)	55,170	1st
28 February 1998	Chelsea	A	1–0	P. Neville 31'	35,411	1st
7 March 1998	Sheffield Wednesday	A	0–2		39,427	1st
11 March 1998	West Ham United	A	1–1	Scholes 66'	25,892	1st
14 March 1998	Arsenal	H	0–1		55,174	1st
28 March 1998	Wimbledon	H	2–0	Johnsen 83', Scholes 90'	55,306	1st
6 April 1998	Blackburn Rovers	A	3–1	Cole 56', Scholes 73', Beckham 90'	30,547	1st
10 April 1998	Liverpool	H	1–1	Johnsen 12'	55,171	1st
18 April 1998	Newcastle United	H	1–1	Beckham 38'	55,194	2nd
27 April 1998	Crystal Palace	A	3–0	Scholes 6', Butt 22', Cole 84'	26,180	2nd
4 May 1998	Leeds United	H	3–0	Giggs 6', Irwin 31' (pen.), Beckham 59'	55,167	2nd
10 May 1998	Barnsley	A	2–0	Cole 6', Sheringham 77'	18,694	2nd

Colours: Green = Manchester United win; Yellow = draw; Red = opponents win.

Pos	Team	Pld	W	D	L	GF	GA	GD	Pts	Qualification or relegation
1	Arsenal (C)	38	23	9	6	68	33	+35	78	Qualification for the Champions League group stage
2	Manchester United	38	23	8	7	73	26	+47	77	Qualification for the Champions League second qualifying round
3	Liverpool	38	18	11	9	68	42	+26	65	Qualification for the UEFA Cup first round
4	Chelsea	38	20	3	15	71	43	+28	63	Qualification for the Cup Winners' Cup first round (Note: Chelsea qualified for the Cup Winners' Cup as defending champions. As they were also the League Cup winners, the UEFA Cup berth vacated was awarded to Blackburn Rovers.)
5	Leeds United	38	17	8	13	57	46	+11	59	Qualification for the UEFA Cup first round (Note: Aston Villa was rewarded entry to the UEFA Cup through UEFA Fair Play ranking.)

Source: Premier League
Rules for classification: 1) points; 2) goal difference; 3) number of goals scored.
(C) Champions

== FA Cup ==
The draw for the third round of the FA Cup saw Manchester United take on cup holders Chelsea at Stamford Bridge in a repeat of the 1994 final. The outcome was the same: United dominated from the outset and Chelsea found themselves 3–0 down before the end of the first half. Cole and Sheringham added to the rout, before Graeme Le Saux and Gianluca Vialli added three between them for Chelsea to keep the score a competitive one. Many journalists and fans regarded the win as United's best of the season. Another five goals were dished out against Division Two outfit Walsall, and in the fifth round they were placed alongside Premiership strugglers, Barnsley, whom they had ripped apart in October. An error by Schmeichel allowed Barnsley to take the lead but Sheringham equalised four minutes later. A replay was needed, much to the discomfort of Ferguson, and in a thrilling cup tie, United were knocked out, putting the ultimate treble dream – comprising the UEFA Champions League, the Premier League and the FA Cup – on hold for another season.

Date	Round	Opponents	H/A	Result F–A	Scorers	Attendance
4 January 1998	Third round	Chelsea	A	5–3	Beckham (2) 23', 28', Cole (2) 45', 66', Sheringham 74'	34,792
24 January 1998	Fourth round	Walsall	H	5–1	Cole (2) 10', 66', Solskjær (2) 39', 68', Johnsen 74'	54,699
15 February 1998	Fifth Round	Barnsley	H	1–1	Sheringham 42'	54,700
25 February 1998	Fifth Round; Replay	Barnsley	A	2–3	Sheringham 57', Cole 82'	18,655

Colours: Green = Manchester United win; Yellow = draw; Red = opponents win.

== League Cup ==
The League Cup was clearly not one of Ferguson's main priorities of the season, as he used it to blood the younger and less-known players. After being swept aside in the Third Round by Ipswich Town – a team at the bottom of the First Division – Ferguson came under intense scrutiny for fielding a reshuffled squad. However, the manager felt that it was, at the time, an unwanted domestic distraction.

Date	Round	Opponents	H/A	Result F–A	Scorers	Attendance
14 October 1997	Third round	Ipswich Town	A	0–2		22,173

Colours: Green = Manchester United win; Yellow = draw; Red = opponents win.

== UEFA Champions League ==
The club launched a new home kit specifically for European games.

=== Group stage ===
European dominance was at the forefront of United's agenda during the 1997–98 season. Having failed to take their chances in a semi-final against eventual champions Borussia Dortmund in 1996–97, Ferguson was resolute to go one step further and emulate Matt Busby's success of 1968, quashing any talk that his team was not good enough.

Early autumn marked the return of the Champions League and Manchester United were paired up with Italian champions, Juventus, Dutch giants Feyenoord and Slovakians Košice in Group B. Ferguson's men started their quest away to Košice; it didn't take them long to stamp their authority – Denis Irwin tapped in an intercepted cross, Henning Berg scored his first goal with a thumping header and Andy Cole completed the rout three minutes from time with a composed finish. The first night of October brought Juventus to Old Trafford in what was to be perhaps one of the best European matches ever staged at Old Trafford. After going a goal down inside 24 seconds to Alessandro Del Piero's cool finish, Teddy Sheringham replied with a looping header before Scholes put United into the lead, dribbling round Angelo Peruzzi to place the ball in the back of the net. Giggs fired into the top left hand corner to give them an historic win. Juventus were given a late consolidation from a Zinedine Zidane free-kick. After the game, an ecstatic Ferguson felt United were in a "great position" and emphasised his belief that his squad was capable of winning the tournament.

Feyenoord were the next to feel the wrath of United in a back-to-back fixture. A penalty from Irwin in the home tie helped ensure the Mancunians would increase their tally to nine points, and a hat-trick from Andy Cole in Rotterdam helped maintain their 100% record in the group stage. However, the game was marred by a high tackle on defender Denis Irwin by Feyenoord midfielder Paul Bosvelt (leaving the Irish international six weeks out at a crucial stage of the season and causing something of a media frenzy back in Britain) and constant clashes between both sets of fans. Nevertheless, United were placed as favourites for the competition, largely due to their impressive start, and a routine 3–0 win at home to Košice ensured qualification to the knockout stage as group winners. Filippo Inzaghi's late header ended United's unbeaten streak in Europe in their last match away to Juventus, ensuring their qualification as one of the best two runners-up.

Date	Opponents	H/A	Result F–A	Scorers	Attendance	Group position
17 September 1997	Košice	A	3–0	Irwin 30', Berg 62', Cole 88'	9,950	2nd
1 October 1997	Juventus	H	3–2	Sheringham 38', Scholes 69', Giggs 90'	53,428	1st
22 October 1997	Feyenoord	H	2–1	Scholes 32', Irwin 73' (pen.)	53,188	1st
5 November 1997	Feyenoord	A	3–1	Cole (3) 31', 44', 75'	51,000	1st
27 November 1997	Košice	H	3–0	Cole 40', Faktor 85' (o.g.), Sheringham 90'	53,535	1st
10 December 1997	Juventus	A	0–1		47,786	1st

Colours: Green = Manchester United win; Yellow = draw; Red = opponents win.

Pos	Team	Pld	W	D	L	GF	GA	GD	Pts	Qualification
1	(England) Manchester United	6	5	0	1	14	5	+9	15	Advance to knockout stage
2	(Italy) Juventus	6	4	0	2	12	8	+4	12	Advance to knockout stage
3	(Netherlands) Feyenoord	6	3	0	3	8	10	−2	9	
4	(Slovakia) Košice	6	0	0	6	2	13	−11	0	

Source: UEFA

=== Knockout phase ===
United were drawn against French champions AS Monaco in the quarter-finals, and drew 0–0 and 1–1 in the first and second legs respectively. AS Monaco went through on away goals, as the second leg was played at Old Trafford.

Date	Round	Opponents	H/A	Result F–A	Scorers	Attendance
4 March 1998	Quarter-final; First leg	AS Monaco	A	0–0		15,000
18 March 1998	Quarter-final; Second leg	AS Monaco	H	1–1	Solskjær 53'	53,683

Colours: Green = Manchester United win; Yellow = draw; Red = opponents win.

== Squad statistics ==
No.	CL no. (Note: Some players were assigned a different squad number specifically for the Champions League.)	Pos.	Name	League		FA Cup		League Cup		Europe		Other		Total		Discipline	
No.	CL no.	Pos.	Name	Apps	Goals	Apps	Goals	Apps	Goals	Apps	Goals	Apps	Goals	Apps	Goals	Yellow Cards	Red Cards
1	1	GK	(Denmark) Peter Schmeichel	32	0	4	0	0	0	7	0	1	0	44	0	0	0
2	2	DF	(England) Gary Neville	34	0	2(1)	0	0	0	8	0	0	0	44(1)	0	3	0
3	3	DF	(Republic of Ireland) Denis Irwin	23(2)	2	3(1)	0	0(1)	0	6	2	1	0	33(4)	4	2	0
4	4	DF	(England) David May	7(2)	0	1	0	1	0	0	0	0	0	9(2)	0	4	0
5	5	DF	(Norway) Ronny Johnsen	18(4)	2	3	1	1	0	5	0	1	1	28(4)	4	2	0
6	6	DF	(England) Gary Pallister	33	0	3	0	0	0	6	0	1	0	43	0	7	1
7	7	MF	(England) David Beckham	34(3)	9	3(1)	2	0	0	8	0	0(1)	0	45(5)	11	6	0
8	8	MF	(England) Nicky Butt	31(2)	3	1	0	0	0	7	0	1	0	40(2)	3	7	0
9	9	FW	(England) Andy Cole	31(2)	15	3	5	1	0	6(1)	5	1	0	42(3)	25	5	0
10	10	FW	(England) Teddy Sheringham	28(3)	9	2(1)	3	0	0	7	2	1	0	38(4)	14	5	0
11	11	MF	(Wales) Ryan Giggs	28(1)	8	2	0	0	0	5	1	1	0	36(1)	9	2	0
12	12	DF	(England) Phil Neville	24(6)	1	3	0	1	0	5(2)	0	1	0	34(8)	1	7	0
13	13	MF	(Scotland) Brian McClair	2(11)	0	3	0	1	0	0(3)	0	0	0	6(14)	0	0	0
14	14	MF	(Netherlands) Jordi Cruyff	3(2)	0	0(1)	0	1	0	0	0	0(1)	0	4(4)	0	1	0
15	15	MF	(Czech Republic) Karel Poborský	3(7)	2	0	0	1	0	2(2)	0	0	0	6(9)	2	1	0
16	16	MF	(Republic of Ireland) Roy Keane (c)	9	2	0	0	0	0	1	0	1	0	11	2	1	0
17	17	GK	(Netherlands) Raimond van der Gouw	4(1)	0	0	0	1	0	1	0	0	0	6(1)	0	0	0
18	18	MF	(England) Paul Scholes	28(3)	8	2	0	0(1)	0	6(1)	2	1	0	37(5)	10	9	0
20	20	FW	(Norway) Ole Gunnar Solskjær	15(7)	6	1(1)	2	0	0	3(3)	1	0	0	19(11)	9	2	1
21	21	DF	(Norway) Henning Berg	23(4)	1	2	0	0	0	5(2)	1	0	0	30(6)	2	4	0
22	24	FW	(Norway) Erik Nevland	0(1)	0	2(1)	0	0(1)	0	0	0	0	0	2(3)	0	0	0
23	23	MF	(England) Ben Thornley	0(5)	0	2	0	1	0	0	0	0	0	3(5)	0	1	0
24	–	DF	(England) John O'Kane	0	0	0	0	0	0	0	0	0	0	0	0	0	0
25	25	GK	(England) Kevin Pilkington	2	0	0	0	0	0	0	0	0	0	2	0	0	0
26	26	DF	(England) Chris Casper	0	0	0	0	0	0	0	0	0	0	0	0	0	0
27	22	MF	(England) Terry Cooke	0	0	0	0	0	0	0	0	0	0	0	0	0	0
28	28	MF	(Northern Ireland) Philip Mulryne	1	0	0(1)	0	1	0	0	0	0	0	2(1)	0	0	0
29	–	MF	(England) Michael Appleton	0	0	0	0	0	0	0	0	0	0	0	0	0	0
30	–	DF	(England) Ronnie Wallwork	0(1)	0	0	0	0	0	0	0	0	0	0(1)	0	0	0
31	29	DF	(England) John Curtis	3(5)	0	0	0	1	0	0	0	0	0	4(5)	0	0	0
32	19	DF	(England) Michael Clegg	1(2)	0	2(1)	0	0	0	0(1)	0	0	0	3(4)	0	0	0
33	–	GK	(England) Nick Culkin	0	0	0	0	0	0	0	0	0	0	0	0	0	0
34	–	MF	(England) Michael Twiss	0	0	0(1)	0	0	0	0	0	0	0	0(1)	0	0	0
35	–	DF	(England) Wes Brown	1(1)	0	0	0	0	0	0	0	0	0	1(1)	0	0	0
36	27	FW	(Scotland) Alex Notman	0	0	0	0	0	0	0	0	0	0	0	0	0	0
37	–	MF	(England) Jonathan Greening	0	0	0	0	0	0	0	0	0	0	0	0	0	0
38	–	DF	(England) Danny Higginbotham	0(1)	0	0	0	0	0	0	0	0	0	0(1)	0	0	0

Note: In the following table figures, in brackets are substitution appearances.

== Transfers ==
United's first departure of the 1997–98 season was Gareth Macklin, who signed for Newcastle United on a free transfer on 1 July. Five days later, Gary Bickerton, Jamie Byers, Christopher Calderone, and Jonathan Phillips were all released. On 22 July, Jon Macken signed for Preston North End for a fee of £250,000, while six days later, Pat McGibbon signed for Wigan Athletic for the same fee. Simon Davies joined Luton Town on 1 August, while a week later, Michael Appleton joined Macken at Preston North End, with Appleton's fee being double Macken's. Stephen Newman joined Middlesbrough on 26 September.

Arriving during the summer were Norwegian duo Erik Nevland and Henning Berg, who signed from Viking and Blackburn Rovers respectively. Both players would eventually rejoin their old clubs, with Nevland rejoining Viking in 1999, and Berg going back to Blackburn in 2000.

Leaving in the winter were Czech midfielder Karel Poborský, English forward Neil Mustoe, and English defender John O'Kane. Andy Duncan joined Cambridge United on 1 April, while on 12 June, Grant Brebner joined Reading. Robert Trees departed to Bristol Rovers on 14 June, while on 30 June, Stuart Brightwell, David Brown, Brian McClair, Ross Millard, Gavin Naylor, and Kevin Pilkington left.

On 24 March, Jonathan Greening joined from York City for a fee of £750,000.

=== In ===
Date	Pos.	Name	From	Fee
2 July 1997	FW	(Norway) Erik Nevland	(Norway) Viking	£1.5m
11 August 1997	DF	(Norway) Henning Berg	(England) Blackburn Rovers	£5m
24 March 1998	MF	(England) Jonathan Greening	(England) York City	£750k

=== Out ===
Date	Pos.	Name	To	Fee
1 July 1997	DF	(Northern Ireland) Gareth Macklin	(England) Newcastle United	Free
6 July 1997	FW	(England) Gary Bickerton	Released	Free
6 July 1997	DF	(England) Jamie Byers	Released	Free
6 July 1997	GK	(England) Christopher Calderone	Released	Free
6 July 1997	FW	(England) Jonathan Phillips	Released	Free
22 July 1997	FW	(England) Jon Macken	(England) Preston North End	£250k
28 July 1997	DF	(Northern Ireland) Pat McGibbon	(England) Wigan Athletic	£250k
1 August 1997	MF	(Wales) Simon Davies	(England) Luton Town	£200k
8 August 1997	MF	(England) Michael Appleton	(England) Preston North End	£500k
26 September 1997	MF	(England) Stephen Newham	(England) Middlesbrough	Free
30 December 1997	MF	(Czech Republic) Karel Poborský	(Portugal) Benfica	£2m
31 December 1997	FW	(England) Neil Mustoe	(England) Wigan Athletic	Free
29 January 1998	DF	(England) John O'Kane	(England) Everton	£400k
1 April 1998	DF	(England) Andy Duncan	(England) Cambridge United	£20k
12 June 1998	MF	(Scotland) Grant Brebner	(England) Reading	£100k
14 June 1998	MF	(England) Robert Trees	(England) Bristol Rovers	Free
30 June 1998	MF	(England) Stuart Brightwell	(England) Hartlepool United	Free
30 June 1998	MF	(England) David Brown	(England) Hull City	Free
30 June 1998	FW	(Scotland) Brian McClair	(Scotland) Motherwell	Free
30 June 1998	DF	(England) Ross Millard	(England) Northwich Victoria	Free
30 June 1998	FW	(England) Gavin Naylor	(England) Middlesbrough	Free
30 June 1998	GK	(England) Kevin Pilkington	(England) Port Vale	Free

=== Loan out ===
Date From	Date To	Position	Name	To
1 August 1997	6 October 1997	FW	(England) Graeme Tomlinson	(England) AFC Bournemouth
1 August 1997	1 September 1997	MF	(England) Robert Trees	(England) Stalybridge Celtic
5 September 1997	5 November 1997	DF	(England) Chris Casper	(England) Swindon Town
20 October 1997	30 June 1998	GK	(England) Paul Gibson	(England) Mansfield Town
30 October 1997	30 November 1997	DF	(England) John O'Kane	(England) Bradford City
17 December 1997	1 April 1998	DF	(England) Paul Teather	(England) AFC Bournemouth
19 December 1997	25 February 1998	DF	(England) Ronnie Wallwork	(England) Carlisle United
9 January 1998	7 February 1998	MF	(Scotland) Grant Brebner	(England) Cambridge United
9 January 1998	1 April 1998	DF	(England) Andy Duncan	(England) Cambridge United
23 February 1998	1 May 1998	MF	(England) Mark Wilson	(Wales) Wrexham
26 February 1998	31 May 1998	MF	(Scotland) Grant Brebner	(Scotland) Hibernian
18 March 1998	4 May 1998	DF	(England) Ronnie Wallwork	(England) Stockport County
26 March 1998	31 May 1998	FW	(England) David Brown	(England) Hull City
26 March 1998	26 April 1998	FW	(England) Graeme Tomlinson	(England) Millwall
31 March 1998	10 April 1998	GK	(England) Kevin Pilkington	(Scotland) Celtic
15 April 1998	1 July 1998	FW	(Norway) Erik Nevland	(Norway) Viking

== Footnotes ==
- Paul Ince joined Internazionale in August 1995, in a £7.5 million transfer. As part of the deal that took the England midfielder to Inter, both teams mutually agreed to participate in the Pirelli Cup and a friendly at Old Trafford.
