= 1996–97 Manchester United F.C. season =

English football club season

Manchester United
1996–97 season
- Chairman: Martin Edwards
- Manager: Alex Ferguson
- Premier League: 1st
- FA Cup: Fourth round
- League Cup: Fourth round
- UEFA Champions League: Semi-finals
- Charity Shield: Winners
- Top goalscorer: League: Ole Gunnar Solskjær (18); All: Ole Gunnar Solskjær (19)
- Highest home attendance: 55,314 vs Wimbledon (29 January 1997)
- Lowest home attendance: 31,966 vs Swindon Town (23 October 1996)
- Average home league attendance: 55,081
Home colours	Away colours	Third colours

The 1996–97 season was Manchester United's fifth season in the Premier League, and their 22nd consecutive season in the top division of English football. United clinched the Premier League title with 75 points – placing them seven points ahead of the three teams below them; Newcastle United, Arsenal and Liverpool.

They also reached the European Cup semi-finals, bowing out to eventual winners Borussia Dortmund of Germany, after losing both legs 1–0. Earlier in the competition, they had lost at home in Europe for the first time, with a 1–0 defeat to Fenerbahçe of Turkey in the group stage. Their defence of the FA Cup ended in the Fourth Round replay with a 1–0 defeat to Wimbledon, while their bid for success in the League Cup was short-lived as they bowed out to eventual winners Leicester City in the Fourth Round.

New signing Ole Gunnar Solskjær was one of the biggest breakthrough stars in the 1996–97 Premier League season, with 19 goals in all competitions, making him the club's top goalscorer. Twenty-two-year-old midfielder David Beckham clinched the PFA Young Player of the Year award in the same season he won his first England cap. Solskjær's fellow Norwegian, Ronny Johnsen, proved himself as a fine successor to Steve Bruce in central defence, but £3.5 million Czech winger Karel Poborský failed to win a regular first team place and was one of the Premier League's biggest disappointments that season. Jordi Cruyff, son of Dutch legend Johan Cruyff, was similarly disappointing, failing to win a regular first team place despite being able to play in midfield, attack or on the left wing.

Just before the start of the season, winger Lee Sharpe left the club after eight years to sign for Leeds United in a £4.5 million deal. Earlier in the summer, captain Steve Bruce had departed to Birmingham City on a free transfer after almost a decade at Old Trafford, while Paul Parker left on a free transfer after his final two seasons at the club had been plagued by injury and the loss of his place in the team to Gary Neville.

The season ended with a major shock as Eric Cantona announced his retirement from playing, prompting manager Alex Ferguson to search for a new striker. The search ended with the £3.5 million capture of Tottenham Hotspur and England 31-year-old Teddy Sheringham.

== Pre-season and friendlies ==
Date	Opponents	H/A	Result F–A	Scorers	Attendance
27 July 1996	Portadown	A	5–0	Scholes (3) 17', 19', 44', Keane 29', Beckham 34'	6,100
28 July 1996	League of Ireland XI	N	4–1	Sharpe 22', Pallister 26', Scholes 41', Cantona 44'	7,720
31 July 1996	Internazionale	A	0–3		33,578
3 August 1996	Ajax	N	1–2	McClair 81'	27,427
4 August 1996	Nottingham Forest	A	3–1	Beckham 80', McClair 83', P. Neville 88'	21,760
13 August 1996	Internazionale	H	0–1		30,266
15 April 1997	Celtic	H	1–2	Keane 44'	43,743
16 May 1997	Coventry City XI	A	2–2	Cantona (2) 69' (pen.), 86'	23,325

== FA Charity Shield ==
Date	Opponents	H/A	Result F–A	Scorers	Attendance
11 August 1996	Newcastle United	N	4–0	Cantona 25', Butt 30', Beckham 86', Keane 88'	73,214

== FA Premier League ==
The old third kit was used vs Southampton (26 October)

Date	Opponents	H/A	Result F–A	Scorers	Attendance	League position
17 August 1996	Wimbledon	A	3–0	Cantona 25', Irwin 57', Beckham 87'	25,786	1st
21 August 1996	Everton	H	2–2	Cruyff 70', Unsworth 82' (o.g.)	54,943	9th
25 August 1996	Blackburn Rovers	H	2–2	Cruyff 38', Solskjær 69'	54,178	5th
4 September 1996	Derby County	A	1–1	Beckham 38'	18,026	4th
7 September 1996	Leeds United	A	4–0	Martyn 3' (o.g.), Butt 49', Poborský 76', Cantona 90'	39,694	5th
14 September 1996	Nottingham Forest	H	4–1	Solskjær 22', Giggs 41', Cantona (2) 82', 90' (pen.)	54,984	1st
21 September 1996	Aston Villa	A	0–0		39,339	4th
29 September 1996	Tottenham Hotspur	H	2–0	Solskjær (2) 38', 57'	54,943	3rd
12 October 1996	Liverpool	H	1–0	Beckham 23'	55,128	4th
20 October 1996	Newcastle United	A	0–5		35,579	5th
26 October 1996	Southampton	A	3–6	Beckham 42', May 56', Scholes 89'	15,253	5th
2 November 1996	Chelsea	H	1–2	May 81'	55,198	6th
16 November 1996	Arsenal	H	1–0	Winterburn 63' (o.g.)	55,210	6th
23 November 1996	Middlesbrough	A	2–2	Keane 17', May 73'	30,063	7th
30 November 1996	Leicester City	H	3–1	Butt (2) 76', 87', Solskjær 85'	55,196	5th
8 December 1996	West Ham United	A	2–2	Solskjær 54', Beckham 75'	25,045	6th
18 December 1996	Sheffield Wednesday	A	1–1	Scholes 61'	37,671	5th
21 December 1996	Sunderland	H	5–0	Solskjær (2) 36', 48', Cantona (2) 43' (pen.), 79', Butt 58'	55,081	3rd
26 December 1996	Nottingham Forest	A	4–0	Beckham 24', Butt 44', Solskjær 67', Cole 76'	29,032	3rd
28 December 1996	Leeds United	H	1–0	Cantona 9' (pen.)	55,256	2nd
1 January 1997	Aston Villa	H	0–0		55,133	3rd
12 January 1997	Tottenham Hotspur	A	2–1	Solskjær 23', Beckham 76'	33,026	3rd
18 January 1997	Coventry City	A	2–0	Giggs 61', Solskjær 80'	23,085	2nd
29 January 1997	Wimbledon	H	2–1	Giggs 75', Cole 82'	55,314	1st
1 February 1997	Southampton	H	2–1	Pallister 19', Cantona 79'	55,269	1st
19 February 1997	Arsenal	A	2–1	Cole 18', Solskjær 32'	38,172	1st
22 February 1997	Chelsea	A	1–1	Beckham 68'	28,336	1st
1 March 1997	Coventry City	H	3–1	Breen 4' (o.g.), Jess 5' (o.g.), Poborský 47'	55,230	1st
8 March 1997	Sunderland	A	1–2	Melville 77' (o.g.)	22,225	1st
15 March 1997	Sheffield Wednesday	H	2–0	Cole 19', Poborský 60'	55,267	1st
22 March 1997	Everton	A	2–0	Solskjær 35', Cantona 79'	40,079	1st
5 April 1997	Derby County	H	2–3	Cantona 47', Solskjær 76'	55,243	1st
12 April 1997	Blackburn Rovers	A	3–2	Cole 32', Scholes 42', Cantona 79'	30,476	1st
19 April 1997	Liverpool	A	3–1	Pallister (2) 13', 42', Cole 63'	40,892	1st
3 May 1997	Leicester City	A	2–2	Solskjær (2) 45', 52'	21,068	1st
5 May 1997	Middlesbrough	H	3–3	Keane 34', G. Neville 42', Solskjær 67'	54,489	1st
8 May 1997	Newcastle United	H	0–0		55,236	1st
11 May 1997	West Ham United	H	2–0	Solskjær 12', Cruyff 84'	55,249	1st

Pos	Team	Pld	W	D	L	GF	GA	GD	Pts	Qualification or relegation
1	Manchester United (C)	38	21	12	5	76	44	+32	75	Qualification for the Champions League group stage
2	Newcastle United	38	19	11	8	73	40	+33	68	Qualification for the Champions League second qualifying round
3	Arsenal	38	19	11	8	62	32	+30	68	Qualification for the UEFA Cup first round (Note: Aston Villa was rewarded entry to the UEFA Cup through UEFA Fair Play ranking.)
4	Liverpool	38	19	11	8	62	37	+25	68	Qualification for the UEFA Cup first round
5	Aston Villa	38	17	10	11	47	34	+13	61	Qualification for the UEFA Cup first round

Source: Premier League
Rules for classification: 1) points; 2) goal difference; 3) number of goals scored.
(C) Champions

== FA Cup ==
United beat Tottenham Hotspur 2–0 to reach the Fourth Round, where they faced Wimbledon, who they had beaten easily 3–0 on the first day of the season; the game ended 1–1. The replay was played at Wimbledon's Selhurst Park, with the game ending 1–0 to Wimbledon, knocking United out of the competition at a very early stage. In between these two FA Cup games, United and Wimbledon faced each other again in the league, with United coming out on top at home, with a 2–1 win, making it all the more shocking that Wimbledon managed to defeat them six days later in the cup.

Date	Round	Opponents	H/A	Result F–A	Scorers	Attendance
5 January 1997	Round 3	Tottenham Hotspur	H	2–0	Scholes 51', Beckham 82'	52,445
25 January 1997	Round 4	Wimbledon	H	1–1	Scholes 89'	53,342
4 February 1997	Round 4 Replay	Wimbledon	A	0–1		25,601

== League Cup ==
As in the previous two seasons, United rested many of their first-team players in the League Cup, instead using the competition to provide first team experience to the club's younger players and reserves. This proved to be a bad move, as the Red Devils just managed to squeeze past Swindon Town to get into the Fourth Round, but they were then defeated by Leicester City 2–0.

Date	Round	Opponents	H/A	Result F–A	Scorers	Attendance
23 October 1996	Round 3	Swindon Town	H	2–1	Poborský 20', Scholes 72'	49,305
27 November 1996	Round 4	Leicester City	A	0–2		20,428

== UEFA Champions League ==
=== Group stage ===
In the group stage, United were drawn together with defending champions Juventus of Italy, Turkish champions Fenerbahçe and Austrian champions Rapid Wien.

Date	Opponents	H/A	Result F–A	Scorers	Attendance	Group position
11 September 1996	Juventus	A	0–1		54,000	4th
25 September 1996	Rapid Wien	H	2–0	Solskjær 20', Beckham 27'	51,831	2nd
16 October 1996	Fenerbahçe	A	2–0	Beckham 55', Cantona 60'	26,200	2nd
30 October 1996	Fenerbahçe	H	0–1		53,297	2nd
20 November 1996	Juventus	H	0–1		53,529	3rd
4 December 1996	Rapid Wien	A	2–0	Giggs 24', Cantona 72'	45,000	2nd

Pos	Team	Pld	W	D	L	GF	GA	GD	Pts	Qualification
1	(Italy) Juventus	6	5	1	0	11	1	+10	16	Advance to knockout stage
2	(England) Manchester United	6	3	0	3	6	3	+3	9	Advance to knockout stage
3	(Turkey) Fenerbahçe	6	2	1	3	3	6	−3	7	
4	(Austria) Rapid Wien	6	0	2	4	2	12	−10	2	

Source: UEFA

=== Knockout phase ===
United were drawn against Portuguese champions Porto in the quarter-finals, and sealed their place in the semi-finals with a 4–0 win in the first leg, followed by a goalless second leg. They were then drawn against the eventual winners, German champions Borussia Dortmund, who beat them 1–0 in each leg, eliminated the Red Devils from the competition 2–0 on aggregate.

Date	Round	Opponents	H/A	Result F–A	Scorers	Attendance
5 March 1997	Quarter-final; First leg	Porto	H	4–0	May 22', Cantona 34', Giggs 60', Cole 80'	53,425
19 March 1997	Quarter-final; Second leg	Porto	A	0–0		40,000
9 April 1997	Semi-final; First leg	Borussia Dortmund	A	0–1		48,500
23 April 1997	Semi-final; Second leg	Borussia Dortmund	H	0–1		53,606

== Squad statistics ==
No.	CL no. (Note: Some players were assigned a different squad number specifically for the Champions League.)	Pos.	Name	League		FA Cup		League Cup		Europe		Other		Total	
No.	CL no.	Pos.	Name	Apps	Goals	Apps	Goals	Apps	Goals	Apps	Goals	Apps	Goals	Apps	Goals
1	1	GK	(Denmark) Peter Schmeichel	36	0	3	0	0	0	9	0	1	0	49	0
2	2	DF	(England) Gary Neville	30(1)	1	3	0	1	0	10	0	0(1)	0	44(2)	1
3	3	DF	(Republic of Ireland) Denis Irwin	29(2)	1	3	0	0	0	8	0	1	0	41(2)	1
4	4	DF	(England) David May	28(1)	3	1	0	2	0	7(1)	1	1	0	39(2)	4
6	6	DF	(England) Gary Pallister	27	3	1	0	0	0	8	0	1	0	37	3
7	7	FW	(France) Eric Cantona (c)	36	11	3	0	0	0	10	3	1	1	50	15
8	8	MF	(England) Nicky Butt	24(2)	5	0	0	0	0	8(1)	0	1	1	33(3)	6
9	9	FW	(England) Andy Cole	10(10)	6	2(1)	0	0	0	2(3)	1	0	0	14(14)	7
10	10	MF	(England) David Beckham	33(3)	8	2	1	0	0	10	2	1	1	46(3)	12
11	11	MF	(Wales) Ryan Giggs	25(1)	3	3	0	0	0	6(1)	2	1	0	35(2)	5
12	28	DF	(England) Phil Neville	15(3)	0	0	0	1	0	2(2)	0	1	0	19(5)	0
13	13	MF	(Scotland) Brian McClair	4(15)	0	1(2)	0	2	0	0(3)	0	0	0	7(20)	0
14	14	MF	(Netherlands) Jordi Cruyff	11(5)	3	0	0	1	0	3(1)	0	0(1)	0	15(7)	3
15	15	MF	(Czech Republic) Karel Poborský	15(7)	3	2	0	2	1	3(3)	0	0(1)	0	22(11)	4
16	16	MF	(Republic of Ireland) Roy Keane	21	2	3	0	2	0	6	0	1	1	33	3
17	17	GK	(Netherlands) Raimond van der Gouw	2	0	0	0	2	0	1	0	0	0	5	0
18	12	MF	(England) Paul Scholes	16(8)	3	2	2	2	1	0(4)	0	1	0	21(12)	6
19	5	DF	(Norway) Ronny Johnsen	26(5)	0	2	0	0	0	9	0	0	0	37(5)	0
20	20	FW	(Norway) Ole Gunnar Solskjær	25(8)	18	0(3)	0	0	0	8(2)	1	0	0	33(13)	19
21	21	DF	(Northern Ireland) Pat McGibbon	0	0	0	0	0	0	0	0	0	0	0	0
22	22	MF	(Wales) Simon Davies	0	0	0	0	0(2)	0	0	0	0	0	0(2)	0
23	23	MF	(England) Ben Thornley	1(1)	0	0	0	2	0	0	0	0	0	3(1)	0
24	24	DF	(England) John O'Kane	1	0	0	0	1	0	0	0	0	0	2	0
25	25	GK	(England) Kevin Pilkington	0	0	0	0	0	0	0	0	0	0	0	0
26	19	DF	(England) Chris Casper	0(2)	0	1	0	2	0	0(1)	0	0	0	3(3)	0
27	–	MF	(England) Terry Cooke	0	0	0	0	0(1)	0	0	0	0	0	0(1)	0
28	–	MF	(Northern Ireland) Philip Mulryne	0	0	0	0	0	0	0	0	0	0	0	0
29	18	MF	(England) Michael Appleton	0	0	0	0	1(1)	0	0	0	0	0	1(1)	0
30	–	DF	(England) Ronnie Wallwork	0	0	0	0	0	0	0	0	0	0	0	0
31	–	DF	(England) John Curtis	0	0	0	0	0	0	0	0	0	0	0	0
32	–	DF	(England) Michael Clegg	3(1)	0	1	0	1	0	0	0	0	0	5(1)	0
33	–	GK	(England) Paul Gibson	0	0	0	0	0	0	0	0	0	0	0	0

== Transfers ==
United's first departure of the 1996–97 season was Hasney Aljofree, who signed for Bolton Wanderers on a free transfer on 2 July. Four days later, Heath Maxon was released. Tony Coton joined Sunderland on 12 July, while a month later, Lee Sharpe joined Leeds United after eight years at Old Trafford.

Arriving in the summer were Norwegian defender Ronny Johnsen, Czech winger Karel Poborský, Norwegian forward Ole Gunnar Solskjær, and Dutch midfielder Jordi Cruyff.

United's only winter departure was American forward Jovan Kirovski, who joined Borussia Dortmund on a free transfer on 8 December. David Fish joined Stockport County on 1 May, while a day later, David Hilton was released. Just under a fortnight later, Colin Murdock joined Preston North End, while on 18 May, Eric Cantona retired. Robert Trees was released on 30 June.

On 27 June, Teddy Sheringham was acquired from Tottenham Hotspur to replace the retired Cantona.

=== In ===
Date	Pos.	Name	From	Fee
10 July 1996	DF	(Norway) Ronny Johnsen	(Turkey) Beşiktaş	£1.2m
20 July 1996	MF	(Czech Republic) Karel Poborský	(Czech Republic) Slavia Prague	£3.5m
23 July 1996	FW	(Norway) Ole Gunnar Solskjær	(Norway) Molde	£1.5m
8 August 1996	MF	(Netherlands) Jordi Cruyff	(Spain) Barcelona	£1.4m
27 June 1997	FW	(England) Teddy Sheringham	(England) Tottenham Hotspur	£3.5m

=== Out ===
Date	Pos.	Name	To	Fee
2 July 1996	DF	(England) Hasney Aljofree	(England) Bolton Wanderers	Free
6 July 1996	GK	(England) Heath Maxon	Released	Free
12 July 1996	GK	(England) Tony Coton	(England) Sunderland	£600k
12 August 1996	MF	(England) Lee Sharpe	(England) Leeds United	£4.5m
8 December 1996	FW	(United States) Jovan Kirovski	(Germany) Borussia Dortmund	Free
1 May 1997	GK	(England) David Fish	(England) Stockport County	Free
2 May 1997	DF	(England) David Hilton	Released	Free
15 May 1997	DF	(Northern Ireland) Colin Murdock	(England) Preston North End	£100k
18 May 1997	FW	(France) Eric Cantona	Retired	
30 June 1997	MF	(England) Robert Trees	Released	Free

=== Loan out ===
Date From	Date To	Position	Name	To
20 September 1996	21 October 1996	DF	(Northern Ireland) Pat McGibbon	(Wales) Swansea City
17 October 1996	17 November 1996	GK	(England) Paul Gibson	(England) Halifax Town
22 October 1996	22 November 1996	DF	(England) John O'Kane	(England) Bury
29 October 1996	16 November 1996	MF	(Wales) Simon Davies	(England) Huddersfield Town
28 November 1996	20 December 1996	MF	(England) Terry Cooke	(England) Birmingham City
14 January 1997	8 March 1997	DF	(England) John O'Kane	(England) Bury
16 January 1997	19 April 1997	GK	(England) Kevin Pilkington	(England) Rotherham United
17 January 1997	15 March 1997	MF	(England) Michael Appleton	(England) Grimsby Town
3 March 1997	31 May 1997	DF	(Northern Ireland) Pat McGibbon	(England) Wigan Athletic
27 March 1997	13 April 1997	DF	(England) John O'Kane	(Wales) Wrexham
