= 1999–2000 Manchester United F.C. season =

English football club season

Manchester United
1999–2000 season
- Chairman: Martin Edwards
- Manager: Sir Alex Ferguson
- FA Premier League: 1st
- League Cup: Third round
- UEFA Champions League: Quarter-finals
- Charity Shield: Runners-up
- UEFA Super Cup: Runners-up
- Intercontinental Cup: Winners
- FIFA Club World Championship: Group stage
- Top goalscorer: League: Dwight Yorke (20); All: Dwight Yorke (24)
- Highest home attendance: 61,629 vs Tottenham Hotspur (6 May 2000)
- Lowest home attendance: 53,250 vs Croatia Zagreb (14 September 1999)
- Average home league attendance: 58,017
Home colours	Away colours	Third colours

The 1999–2000 season was Manchester United's eighth season in the Premier League, and their 25th consecutive season in the top division of English football. United won the Premier League title for the sixth time in eight seasons (with a record 18-point margin and 97 goals scored) as well as becoming the first English club to win the Intercontinental Cup when they defeated Palmeiras in Tokyo. However, they surrendered their Champions League title with a 3–2 defeat by eventual champions Real Madrid in the quarter-finals. The club controversially did not defend their FA Cup crown, upon request by The Football Association, to compete in the inaugural FIFA Club World Championship in Brazil instead. United also lost the UEFA Super Cup 1-0 to Lazio in Monaco.

Mark Bosnich, previously at United as a reserve goalkeeper from 1989 to 1991, returned to the club as Peter Schmeichel's successor, but failed to live up to expectations and in September, the club swooped for Italian Massimo Taibi to provide competition for him. However, Taibi suffered some high-profile mistakes and returned to his homeland at the end of the season after just four games for the club. As the season wore on, long-time reserve goalkeeper Raimond van der Gouw was increasingly called on as the starting goalkeeper, and proved a fairly reliable performer, but at 37 years old as of the end of the season, it was clear that he would not be a long-term solution. United then solved the goalkeeping crisis by paying Monaco £7.8 million for Fabien Barthez. Also new to the squad for 1999–2000 were French defender Mikaël Silvestre and South African winger Quinton Fortune. Jesper Blomqvist and Wes Brown missed the entire season due to injury, while similar misfortune restricted defenders David May and Ronny Johnsen to three first-team appearances between them. Jordi Cruyff left the club on a free transfer to Alavés at the end of the season, seeing out his four-year contract at a club where he had failed to claim a regular first-team place.

== Pre-season and friendlies ==
Date	Opponents	H / A	Result F–A	Scorers	Attendance
15 July 1999	Australia	N	2–0	Blomqvist 45', Butt 74'	71,215
18 July 1999	Australia	N	1–0	Yorke 24'	78,032
21 July 1999	Shanghai Shenhua	A	2–0	Solskjær 60', Sheringham 69'	80,000
24 July 1999	South China	A	2–0	Sheringham 20', Cole 23'	40,000
30 July 1999	Bristol Rovers	A	2–2	Solskjær 7', Healy 87'	10,534
3 August 1999	Omagh Town	A	9–0	Clegg (2), Cole (2), Sheringham (4), Nixon (o.g.)	7,000
4 August 1999	Wigan Athletic	A	2–0	Scholes, Solskjær	15,000
11 October 1999	Rest of the World XI	H	2–4	Sheringham 43', Scholes 87'	54,842

== FA Charity Shield ==
Date	Opponents	H / A	Result F–A	Scorers	Attendance
1 August 1999	Arsenal	N	1–2	Yorke 37'	70,185

== UEFA Super Cup ==
Date	Opponents	H / A	Result F–A	Scorers	Attendance
27 August 1999	Lazio	N	0–1		14,461

== FA Premier League ==
Date	Opponents	H / A	Result F–A	Scorers	Attendance	League position
8 August 1999	Everton	A	1–1	Yorke 7'	39,141	9th
11 August 1999	Sheffield Wednesday	H	4–0	Scholes 9', Yorke 35', Cole 54', Solskjær 84'	54,941	3rd
14 August 1999	Leeds United	H	2–0	Yorke (2) 77', 80'	55,187	1st
22 August 1999	Arsenal	A	2–1	Keane (2) 59', 88'	38,147	1st
25 August 1999	Coventry City	A	2–1	Scholes 63', Yorke 75'	22,024	1st
30 August 1999	Newcastle United	H	5–1	Cole (4) 14', 46', 65', 71', Giggs 81'	55,190	1st
11 September 1999	Liverpool	A	3–2	Carragher (2) 4' (o.g.), 45' (o.g.), Cole 18'	44,929	1st
18 September 1999	Wimbledon	H	1–1	Cruyff 74'	55,189	1st
25 September 1999	Southampton	H	3–3	Sheringham 34', Yorke (2) 38', 64'	55,249	1st
3 October 1999	Chelsea	A	0–5		34,909	2nd
16 October 1999	Watford	H	4–1	Yorke 40', Cole (2) 42', 50', Irwin 45' (pen.)	55,188	2nd
23 October 1999	Tottenham Hotspur	A	1–3	Giggs 24'	36,072	3rd
30 October 1999	Aston Villa	H	3–0	Scholes 30', Cole 45', Keane 65'	55,211	2nd
6 November 1999	Leicester City	H	2–0	Cole (2) 30', 83'	55,191	1st
20 November 1999	Derby County	A	2–1	Butt 53', Cole 84'	33,370	1st
4 December 1999	Everton	H	5–1	Irwin 27' (pen.), Solskjær (4) 29', 43', 52', 58'	55,193	1st
18 December 1999	West Ham United	A	4–2	Yorke (2) 9', 63', Giggs (2) 13', 20'	26,037	1st
26 December 1999	Bradford City	H	4–0	Fortune 75', Yorke 79', Cole 88', Keane 89'	55,188	2nd
28 December 1999	Sunderland	A	2–2	Keane 27', Butt 87'	42,026	2nd
24 January 2000	Arsenal	H	1–1	Sheringham 74'	58,293	2nd
29 January 2000	Middlesbrough	H	1–0	Beckham 87'	61,267	1st
2 February 2000	Sheffield Wednesday	A	1–0	Sheringham 74'	39,640	1st
5 February 2000	Coventry City	H	3–2	Cole (2) 40', 55', Scholes 77'	61,380	1st
12 February 2000	Newcastle United	A	0–3		36,470	1st
20 February 2000	Leeds United	A	1–0	Cole 52'	40,160	1st
26 February 2000	Wimbledon	A	2–2	Cruyff 30', Cole 80'	26,129	1st
4 March 2000	Liverpool	H	1–1	Solskjær 45'	61,592	1st
11 March 2000	Derby County	H	3–1	Yorke (3) 13', 70', 72'	61,619	1st
18 March 2000	Leicester City	A	2–0	Beckham 33', Yorke 84'	22,170	1st
25 March 2000	Bradford City	A	4–0	Yorke (2) 38', 40', Scholes 71', Beckham 79'	18,276	1st
1 April 2000	West Ham United	H	7–1	Scholes (3) 24', 51', 63' (pen.), Irwin 27', Cole 45', Beckham 66', Solskjær 73'	61,611	1st
10 April 2000	Middlesbrough	A	4–3	Giggs 46', Cole 60', Scholes 74', Fortune 88'	34,775	1st
15 April 2000	Sunderland	H	4–0	Solskjær (2) 3', 51', Butt 65', Berg 70'	61,612	1st
22 April 2000	Southampton	A	3–1	Beckham 8', Benali 15' (o.g.), Solskjær 30'	15,245	1st
24 April 2000	Chelsea	H	3–2	Yorke (2) 11', 69', Solskjær 40'	61,593	1st
29 April 2000	Watford	A	3–2	Yorke 69', Giggs 71', Cruyff 87'	20,250	1st
6 May 2000	Tottenham Hotspur	H	3–1	Solskjær 5', Beckham 34', Sheringham 36'	61,629	1st
14 May 2000	Aston Villa	A	1–0	Sheringham 65'	39,217	1st

Pos	Team	Pld	W	D	L	GF	GA	GD	Pts	Qualification or relegation
1	Manchester United (C)	38	28	7	3	97	45	+52	91	Qualification for the Champions League first group stage
2	Arsenal	38	22	7	9	73	43	+30	73	Qualification for the Champions League first group stage
3	Leeds United	38	21	6	11	58	43	+15	69	Qualification for the Champions League third qualifying round
4	Liverpool	38	19	10	9	51	30	+21	67	Qualification for the UEFA Cup first round (Note: Chelsea qualified for the UEFA Cup as FA Cup winners.)
5	Chelsea	38	18	11	9	53	34	+19	65	Qualification for the UEFA Cup first round

Source: Premier League
Rules for classification: 1) points; 2) goal difference; 3) number of goals scored.
(C) Champions

== League Cup ==
Date	Round	Opponents	H / A	Result F–A	Scorers	Attendance
13 October 1999	Round 3	Aston Villa	A	0–3		33,815

== UEFA Champions League ==
=== Group stage ===
This home kit was only used for European and FIFA matches.

Date	Opponents	H / A	Result F–A	Scorers	Attendance	Group position
14 September 1999	Croatia Zagreb	H	0–0		53,250	3rd
22 September 1999	Sturm Graz	A	3–0	Keane 16', Yorke 31', Cole 33'	16,480	2nd
29 September 1999	Marseille	H	2–1	Cole 79', Scholes 83'	53,993	1st
19 October 1999	Marseille	A	0–1		56,732	2nd
27 October 1999	Croatia Zagreb	A	2–1	Beckham 32', Keane 49'	27,500	1st
2 November 1999	Sturm Graz	H	2–1	Solskjær 56', Keane 65'	53,745	1st

Pos	Team	Pld	W	D	L	GF	GA	GD	Pts	Qualification
1	(England) Manchester United	6	4	1	1	9	4	+5	13	Advance to second group stage
2	(France) Marseille	6	3	1	2	10	8	+2	10	Advance to second group stage
3	(Austria) Sturm Graz	6	2	0	4	5	12	−7	6	Transfer to UEFA Cup
4	Croatia Zagreb	6	1	2	3	7	7	0	5	

Source: UEFA

=== Second group stage ===
Date	Opponents	H / A	Result F–A	Scorers	Attendance	Group position
23 November 1999	Fiorentina	A	0–2		36,002	3rd
8 December 1999	Valencia	H	3–0	Keane 38', Solskjær 47', Scholes 70'	54,606	2nd
1 March 2000	Bordeaux	H	2–0	Giggs 41', Sheringham 84'	59,786	2nd
7 March 2000	Bordeaux	A	2–1	Keane 33', Solskjær 84'	30,130	1st
15 March 2000	Fiorentina	H	3–1	Cole 20', Keane 33', Yorke 70'	59,926	1st
21 March 2000	Valencia	A	0–0		40,419	1st

Pos	Team	Pld	W	D	L	GF	GA	GD	Pts	Qualification
1	(England) Manchester United	6	4	1	1	10	4	+6	13	Advance to knockout stage
2	(Spain) Valencia	6	3	1	2	9	5	+4	10	Advance to knockout stage
3	(Italy) Fiorentina	6	2	2	2	7	8	−1	8	
4	(France) Bordeaux	6	0	2	4	5	14	−9	2	

Source: UEFA

=== Knockout phase ===
Date	Round	Opponents	H / A	Result F–A	Scorers	Attendance
4 April 2000	Quarter-final; First leg	Real Madrid	A	0–0		64,119
19 April 2000	Quarter-final; Second leg	Real Madrid	H	2–3	Beckham 64', Scholes 88' (pen.)	59,178

== Intercontinental Cup ==
Date	Opponents	H / A	Result F–A	Scorers	Attendance
30 November 1999	Palmeiras	N	1–0	Keane 35'	53,372

== FIFA Club World Championship ==
=== Group stage ===
Date	Opponents	H / A	Result F–A	Scorers	Attendance	Group position
6 January 2000	Necaxa	N	1–1	Yorke 88'	50,000	2nd
8 January 2000	Vasco da Gama	N	1–3	Butt 81'	73,000	3rd
11 January 2000	South Melbourne	N	2–0	Fortune (2) 8', 20'	25,000	3rd

Pos	Team	Pld	W	D	L	GF	GA	GD	Pts	Qualification
1	(Brazil) Vasco da Gama	3	3	0	0	7	2	+5	9	Advance to final
2	(Mexico) Necaxa	3	1	1	1	5	4	+1	4	Advance to match for third place
3	(England) Manchester United	3	1	1	1	4	4	0	4	
4	(Australia) South Melbourne	3	0	0	3	1	7	−6	0	

Source: FIFA

== Squad statistics ==
No.	CWC no. (Note: Clubs had to submit a 23-man squad to compete in the 2000 FIFA Club World Championship, who all had to be numbered between 1 and 23. Some players had to be assigned a different squad number specifically for the competition.)	Pos.	Name	League		League Cup		Europe		Club World Championship		Other		Total	
No.	CWC no.	Pos.	Name	Apps	Goals	Apps	Goals	Apps	Goals	Apps	Goals	Apps	Goals	Apps	Goals
1	1	GK	(Australia) Mark Bosnich	23	0	1	0	7	0	2	0	2	0	35	0
2	2	DF	(England) Gary Neville	22	0	0	0	9	0	2	0	2	0	35	0
3	3	DF	(Republic of Ireland) Denis Irwin	25	3	0	0	13	0	2	0	2	0	42	3
4	–	DF	(England) David May	0(1)	0	0	0	1	0	0	0	0(1)	0	1(2)	0
5	–	DF	(Norway) Ronny Johnsen	2(1)	0	0	0	0	0	0	0	0	0	2(1)	0
6	6	DF	(Netherlands) Jaap Stam	33	0	0	0	13	0	2	0	3	0	51	0
7	7	MF	(England) David Beckham	30(1)	6	0	0	12	2	1(1)	0	3	0	46(2)	8
8	8	MF	(England) Nicky Butt	21(11)	3	0	0	4(2)	0	2	1	2	0	29(13)	4
9	9	FW	(England) Andy Cole	23(5)	19	0	0	13	3	2	0	2	0	40(5)	22
10	10	FW	(England) Teddy Sheringham	15(12)	5	0	0	3(6)	1	0(2)	0	1(2)	0	19(22)	6
11	11	MF	(Wales) Ryan Giggs	30	6	0	0	11	1	2	0	1	0	44	7
12	12	DF	(England) Phil Neville	25(4)	0	0	0	6(3)	0	2(1)	0	2	0	35(8)	0
13	–	DF	(England) John Curtis	0(1)	0	1	0	0	0	0	0	0(1)	0	1(2)	0
14	14	MF	(Netherlands) Jordi Cruyff	1(7)	3	1	0	1(3)	0	1(1)	0	1(1)	0	5(12)	3
15	–	MF	(Sweden) Jesper Blomqvist	0	0	0	0	0	0	0	0	0	0	0	0
16	16	MF	(Republic of Ireland) Roy Keane (c)	28(1)	5	0	0	12	6	2	0	2	1	44(1)	12
17	17	GK	(Netherlands) Raimond van der Gouw	11(3)	0	0	0	7	0	1	0	1	0	20(3)	0
18	–	MF	(England) Paul Scholes	27(4)	9	0	0	11	3	0	0	3	0	41(4)	12
19	19	FW	(Trinidad and Tobago) Dwight Yorke	29(3)	20	0	0	9(2)	2	2	1	1(1)	1	41(6)	24
20	20	FW	(Norway) Ole Gunnar Solskjær	15(13)	12	1	0	4(7)	3	2(1)	0	2(1)	0	24(22)	15
21	21	DF	(Norway) Henning Berg	16(6)	1	0	0	11(1)	0	1	0	2	0	30(7)	1
23	–	DF	(England) Michael Clegg	0(2)	0	1	0	1(1)	0	0	0	0	0	2(3)	0
24	–	DF	(England) Wes Brown	0	0	0	0	0	0	0	0	0	0	0	0
25	22	MF	(South Africa) Quinton Fortune	4(2)	2	0	0	1(3)	0	1(1)	2	0	0	6(6)	4
26	–	GK	(Italy) Massimo Taibi	4	0	0	0	0	0	0	0	0	0	4	0
27	5	DF	(France) Mikaël Silvestre	30(1)	0	0	0	2(2)	0	2	0	1	0	35(3)	0
28	4	DF	(England) Danny Higginbotham	2(1)	0	1	0	0(1)	0	1	0	0	0	4(2)	0
30	23	DF	(England) Ronnie Wallwork	0(5)	0	1	0	0	0	1	0	0	0	2(5)	0
31	–	GK	(England) Nick Culkin	0(1)	0	0	0	0	0	0	0	0	0	0(1)	0
33	18	MF	(England) Mark Wilson	1(2)	0	0	0	2(1)	0	1	0	0	0	4(3)	0
34	15	MF	(England) Jonathan Greening	1(3)	0	1	0	1(1)	0	1	0	0(1)	0	4(5)	0
37	–	DF	(Republic of Ireland) John O'Shea	0	0	1	0	0	0	0	0	0	0	1	0
38	–	FW	(Northern Ireland) David Healy	0	0	0(1)	0	0	0	0	0	0	0	0(1)	0
39	–	MF	(England) Luke Chadwick	0	0	1	0	0	0	0	0	0	0	1	0
41	–	MF	(England) Richard Wellens	0	0	0(1)	0	0	0	0	0	0	0	0(1)	0
42	–	MF	(England) Michael Twiss	0	0	1	0	0	0	0	0	0	0	1	0
– (Note: Rachubka was not assigned a number for the rest of the season.)	13	GK	(England) Paul Rachubka	0	0	0	0	0	0	0(1)	0	0	0	0(1)	0

== Transfers ==
No players left Manchester United in the 1999 summer transfer window.

On 21 August, South African midfielder Quinton Fortune signed from Atlético Madrid for a fee of £1.5 million. Also arriving were Italian goalkeeper Massimo Taibi and French defender Mikaël Silvestre. All three players had slightly different careers at United and all stayed at United for a different number of seasons: Fortune spent seven years at Old Trafford, and his career was mixed; Taibi turned out to be a major flop and left after just one season; Silvestre left in 2008 and had a successful career with United.

United's only winter departure was Norwegian striker Erik Nevland, who returned to his former club Viking after two seasons. Richard Wellens departed on 23 March to Blackpool for a nominal fee. John Curtis joined Blackburn Rovers on 31 May for a fee of £1.5 million, while Michael Twiss joined Port Vale on 30 June on a free transfer.

No players joined United in the winter transfer window, but on 21 May, French goalkeeper Fabien Barthez was signed from Monaco.

=== In ===
Date	Pos.	Name	From	Fee
21 August 1999	MF	(South Africa) Quinton Fortune	(Spain) Atlético Madrid	£1.5m
31 August 1999	GK	(Italy) Massimo Taibi	(Italy) Venezia	£4.5m
10 September 1999	DF	(France) Mikaël Silvestre	(Italy) Inter Milan	£4m
21 May 2000	GK	(France) Fabien Barthez	(France) Monaco	£7.8m

=== Out ===
Date	Pos.	Name	To	Fee
20 December 1999	FW	(Norway) Erik Nevland	(Norway) Viking	£250k
23 March 2000	MF	(England) Richard Wellens	(England) Blackpool	Nominal
31 May 2000	DF	(England) John Curtis	(England) Blackburn Rovers	£1.5m
25 July 2000	MF	(England) Michael Twiss	(England) Port Vale	Free
