= Andy Cole =

English footballer (born 1971)

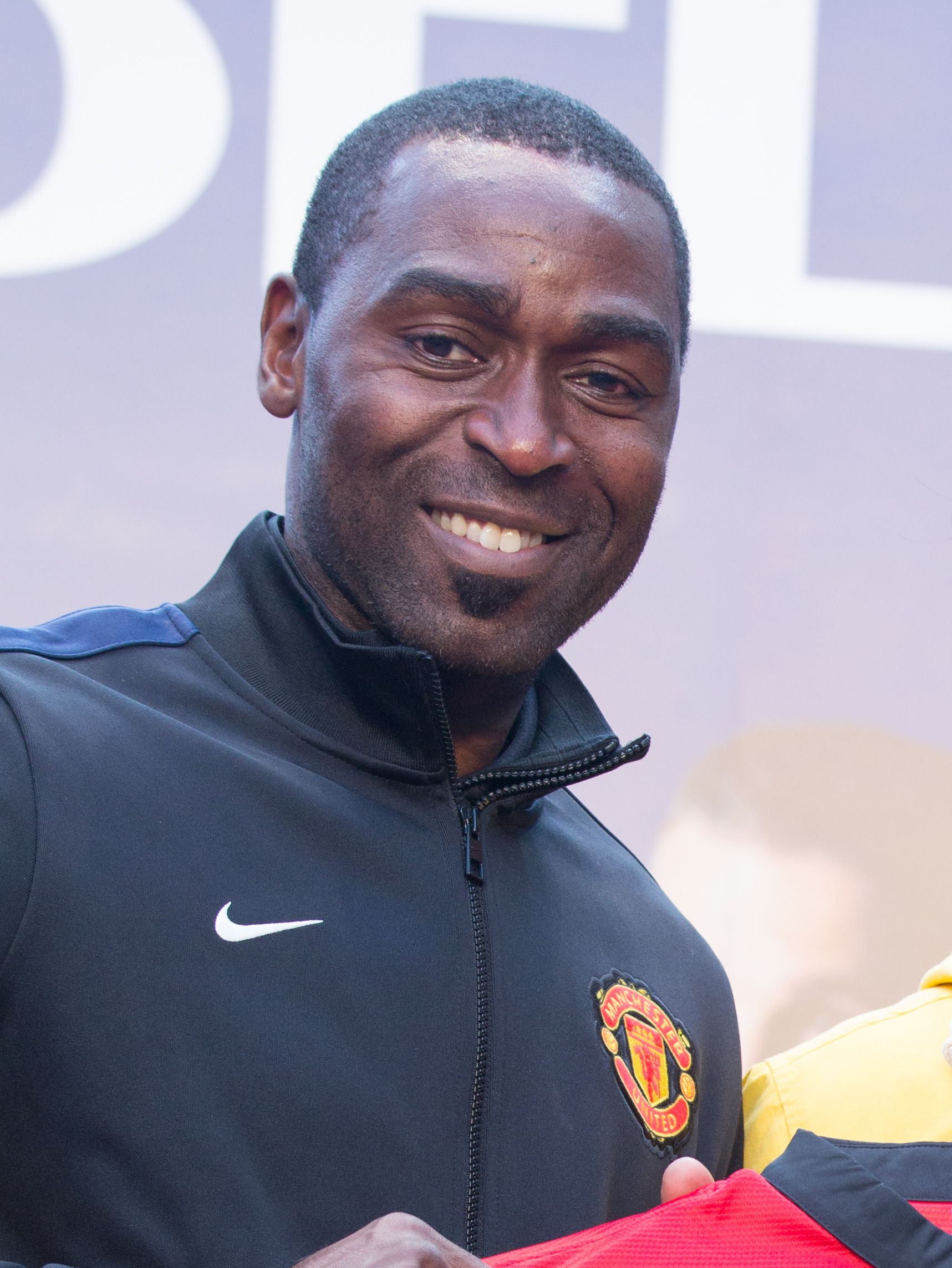
- Cole in 2014

Personal information
- Full name: Andrew Alexander Cole
- Date of birth: 15 October 1971 (age 55)
- Place of birth: Nottingham, England
- Height: 5 ft 10 in (1.78 m)
- Position: Striker

Youth career
- 1988–1989: Arsenal

Senior career*
Years	Team	Apps	(Gls)
1989–1992	Arsenal	1	(0)
1991	→ Fulham (loan)	13	(3)
1992	→ Bristol City (loan)	12	(8)
1992–1993	Bristol City	29	(12)
1993–1995	Newcastle United	70	(55)
1995–2001	Manchester United	195	(93)
2001–2004	Blackburn Rovers	83	(27)
2004–2005	Fulham	31	(12)
2005–2006	Manchester City	22	(9)
2006–2007	Portsmouth	18	(3)
2007	→ Birmingham City (loan)	5	(1)
2007–2008	Sunderland	7	(0)
2008	→ Burnley (loan)	13	(6)
2008	Nottingham Forest	10	(0)
Total		509	(229)

International career
1991	England U20	3	(0)
1992–1993	England U21	8	(4)
1994	England B	1	(1)
1995–2001	England	15	(1)
- * Club domestic league appearances and goals

Andrew Alexander Cole (born 15 October 1971) is an English former professional footballer who played as a striker. His professional career lasted from 1988 to 2008, and is mostly remembered for his time with Manchester United, who paid a British record transfer fee to sign him from Newcastle United. Cole spent six years with Manchester United and won nine trophies, including five Premier League titles and the Treble of the Premier League, FA Cup and UEFA Champions League in 1999.

As well as Manchester United and Newcastle United, Cole also played in the top division of English football for Arsenal, Blackburn Rovers, Fulham, Manchester City, Portsmouth and Sunderland, as well as in The Football League for Bristol City, Birmingham City, Burnley and Nottingham Forest. He is the fifth-highest goalscorer in Premier League history with 187 goals, and used to hold the Premier League records for most goals scored in a 42-game season (34), the fastest player to score 50 goals (65 matches), and the first player to top both the Premier League's goalscoring and assist charts in the same season (1993–94).

Cole has the distinction of having won every top-level team competition in English football at least once, as well as the primary European competition, the UEFA Champions League. As an individual he has won the PFA Young Player of the Year award. Cole was capped 15 times for the England national team between 1995 and 2001, scoring once against Albania in a 2002 FIFA World Cup qualifier.

== Club career ==
=== Arsenal ===
Cole began his career as a youth player for Arsenal on leaving school in 1988, signing professional in 1989. He made his only league appearance for Arsenal, aged 19, as a substitute against Sheffield United at Highbury during a First Division match on 29 December 1990. Arsenal won 4–1 but Cole did not score. He also made a substitute appearance against Tottenham Hotspur in the Charity Shield in 1991 and almost made an immediate impact, hitting the side netting from outside the penalty area. The following season, Cole was loaned to Fulham in the Third Division, where he scored three goals in 13 matches.

Cole joined Second Division Bristol City on loan in March 1992 before signing in a £500,000 permanent deal in the summer of 1992, at the time becoming their most expensive player. Having proved himself as a competent young goalscorer with Bristol City (who began the 1992–93 season in the new Football League Division One following the creation of the Premier League), Cole was quickly one of the hottest prospects in England and his name was frequently linked with Premier League clubs throughout the 1992–93 season.

=== Newcastle United ===
In February 1993, Division One leaders Newcastle United broke their club transfer record by paying £1.75 million to sign Cole. He then scored 12 goals in as many league matches as Newcastle cruised to the Division One title and won promotion to the Premier League. His 12 goals included two hat-tricks, the first against Barnsley on 7 April, the second on the final day of the season in a 7–1 hammering of Leicester City. He also scored the first of the club's two goals in their 2–0 promotion clinching win over Grimsby Town at Blundell Park on 4 May.

After David Kelly was sold to Wolverhampton Wanderers, manager Kevin Keegan brought in Peter Beardsley as Cole's strike partner for the 1993–94 Premier League campaign.

Cole scored 34 goals in 40 matches during Newcastle's first Premier League season as they finished third, and qualified for the UEFA Cup for the first time since the 1970s. His first top division goal was in a 1–1 draw against defending league champions Manchester United at Old Trafford on 21 August 1993. This was Newcastle's first goal in the Premier League. Exactly three months later, Cole scored all three goals as Newcastle defeated Liverpool 3–0 at home. Another emphatic hat-trick followed against Coventry City in late February and with Peter Beardsley almost as lethal as his strike partner. Cole scored 41 total goals in all competitions – breaking the club's goalscoring record which had been set by Hughie Gallacher nearly 70 years earlier (Gallacher still holds the record for the highest number of league goals in a season with 36). Cole scored in 26 different Premier League appearances for Newcastle in 1993–94, which is a season record in the competition by a player.

Cole was subsequently voted PFA Young Player of the Year for that season.

Cole then scored 9 goals in 18 Premier League matches for Newcastle after the start of the 1994–95 season, and also scored a hat-trick against Royal Antwerp in the UEFA Cup.

In all, Cole scored 68 goals in 84 matches for Newcastle, giving him a strike rate of 81%. Cole's last goal for Newcastle United came in the 1–1 home draw with Ipswich Town on 26 November 1994.

=== Manchester United ===
On 10 January 1995, Cole was suddenly sold in a shock deal to Manchester United for a deal worth £7 million – £6 million cash plus £1 million-rated Keith Gillespie going in the opposite direction, setting a new record for the most expensive British transfer. Newcastle fans were saddened and confused with Keegan for selling Cole, leading to Keegan publicly confronting fans at St James' Park, against the advice of chairman Sir John Hall and first team coach Terry McDermott, explaining his reasons on the day of the transfer. Cole stated his sadness at leaving the club, however felt the iconic status Newcastle fans aligned with him was premature and affecting him personally, while he cited Newcastle's November loss to Wimbledon as permanently damaging his relationship with Keegan. McDermott stated in his autobiography that Keegan decided to sell Cole citing a drop in form and enthusiasm, while also hoping to sign Queens Park Rangers striker Les Ferdinand shortly following Cole's departure. Ferdinand signed for Newcastle that summer.

Despite joining halfway through the 1994–95 season, Cole still managed to score 12 goals in just 18 Premier League matches for United. This included his first, the winner in a 1–0 victory over Aston Villa on 4 February at Old Trafford and five in the 9–0 rout of Ipswich Town, making him the first player to score five goals in a Premier League match. He also scored twice in away wins over Leicester City and Coventry City during the season's final stages, as his new team kept up the pressure and cut the gap between themselves and league leaders Blackburn Rovers.

However, Cole missed two goal chances in the final minutes against West Ham United on the final day of the season as they could only manage a 1–1 draw and the league title went to Blackburn Rovers instead. He was cup-tied for the FA Cup Final a week later. Without him, United lost to Everton 1–0. United were also without the banned Eric Cantona and the injured Andrei Kanchelskis, the club's two other highest scoring players that season.

Cole's first full season in 1995–96 with Manchester United proved to be difficult, as Cole struggled to find his trademark form in a side now built around the much heralded return of Eric Cantona. Though Cole scored in four consecutive matches halfway through the season, including an important opening goal in United's 2–0 defeat of title rivals Newcastle United on 27 December, Cole was badgered by fans and critics alike across much of the season for only scoring 14 times and missing many chances. However, Cole picked up his form in the final stages of the season and scored crucial goals including the equaliser in the FA Cup semi-final against Chelsea to help send United to Wembley Stadium again. He then collected his first Premier League title winners medal and scored the second goal in United's 3–0 defeat of Middlesbrough on the final day of the season to help United win the Premier League title for the third time in four years - a remarkable turnaround as his new club had been 10 points behind his old club at Christmas.

He also played in United's FA Cup final victory to become part of England's first ever side to win the double twice.

Before the 1996–97 season began, Cole had to deal with being offered to Blackburn Rovers as part-exchange in a £12 million deal that would have brought Alan Shearer to Old Trafford, but the offer was rejected and Shearer joined Newcastle instead. Despite Alex Ferguson's clear indication to Cole that he was looking for another striker, after the Shearer deal fell through, Cole fought to stay at the club and was handed the number 9 shirt, having previously worn 17. The arrival of Ole Gunnar Solskjær – and being the victim of two broken legs suffered after a tackle by Neil Ruddock in a reserve match against Liverpool, restricted Cole's first-team chances further. However, he managed to recover by December 1996 and still played in 20 Premier League matches (ten as a substitute) for the season. Cole then ended the season strongly with several crucial goals in both the league (such as away at title rivals Arsenal), and in the UEFA Champions League (where he scored a goal voted the season's best European goal against Porto) to complete his comeback from injury. Cole then scored the title sealing goal in a landmark 3–1 win for United at Anfield – the scene of his broken legs a few months earlier - as United moved closer to another title triumph.

For the 1997–98 season, the retirement of Eric Cantona saw Cole emerge as first choice striker once again, and he discovered his best form ever for the club. He found himself starting most of United's games that season, either alongside Solskjaer or new signing Teddy Sheringham.

He became the joint top goalscorer in the Premier League during the course of the season with 18, several of which were spectacular efforts. The most notable was perhaps a chip against Everton, which fans voted as the Manchester United goal of the season. Cole also developed a strong partnership with Teddy Sheringham (despite considerable personal friction between the two), but United finished trophyless for only the second time in the 1990s as they surrendered their lead of the Premier League to Arsenal during the final two months of the season.

Cole achieved several personal landmarks in this campaign, scoring his first European hat-trick for the club in an away match at Feyenoord, as well as ending the season as runner-up in the PFA Players' Player of the Year award to Arsenal's Dennis Bergkamp. Despite this accreditation, and being the leading goalscorer in all competitions that season with 25, Cole was omitted from England's 1998 FIFA World Cup squad by national coach Glenn Hoddle. Cole remained upbeat when interviewed and when asked about his new-found return to success, he claimed he had found freedom in his life after the injuries and erratic form of his earlier time at Old Trafford, saying he had great joy with his young son and lived for him and his family in his faith as a born-again Christian. He also claimed the friendship of Ryan Giggs, his roommate on away matches, was a major motivating factor through the tough times when fans and media doubted him at United.

Cole faced competition from new signing Dwight Yorke, Teddy Sheringham and Ole Gunnar Solskjær during the 1998–99 season, but ended up developing an immensely successful partnership with Yorke. The two contributed 53 goals between them and were rated as one of the most feared attacking partnerships in Europe, with the pair scoring against sides like Barcelona away at the Camp Nou, and repeating the form all season with incredible one-touch passes and assists that at times seemed to demonstrate a telepathic understanding. Although Solskjaer still managed to excel on occasions whether as a starting player or a substitute, and Sheringham also managed to do well and score crucial goals when he played.

Cole played a key role in the side's unique treble of the Premier League title, FA Cup and UEFA Champions League. Cole scored the winning goal in United's final Premier League match of the season against Tottenham Hotspur, a result which meant United finished one point ahead of rivals Arsenal to win the Premier League title. He also scored United's third and winning goal in their Champions League semi-final second leg against Juventus, sealing their place in the final. Also in this season, Cole scored his 100th Premier League goal in a top-of-the-table clash against Arsenal at Old Trafford on 17 February; the match ended 1–1.

During United's pre-season tour of Australia in July 1999, Cole was involved in a tackle which left 19-year-old Australian defender Simon Colosimo sidelined for six months and requiring a complete knee reconstruction. Before the injury, Colosimo was one of Australia's best young players and was about to make a big money move to Europe, and was never able to complete a career in Europe, despite a handful of appearances for Manchester City.

Cole was United's second top scorer again in 1999–2000 with 19 goals in 28 Premier League matches. He collected his fourth Premier League title medal in five seasons, and scored over 20 goals in all competitions for the third successive season. Cole scored many goals for United including the only goal of the game in their top-of-the-table clash against their closest rivals Leeds United. He also joined an elite group during this season by scoring his 100th goal for the club in a 2–2 draw against Wimbledon.

Another title followed in 2000–01 when, despite suffering from an injury that restricted his appearances, Cole scored 13 goals in all competitions, including four in the UEFA Champions League, allowing him (at the time) to become Manchester United's record goal scorer in European competition of all time, eclipsing the record set some 30 years earlier by Denis Law.

The following 2001–02 season saw Cole face fresh competition from new signing Ruud van Nistelrooy, as well as Dwight Yorke, Ole Gunnar Solskjær and also Paul Scholes for places up front, with Sir Alex Ferguson adopting a more conservative approach, especially in European matches, by playing Scholes behind Van Nistelrooy with Roy Keane and Juan Sebastián Verón in a three-man midfield. Despite this, Cole managed to score seven goals before leaving for Blackburn Rovers halfway through the season after falling behind to the formidable partnership of Van Nistelrooy and Solskjær, meaning that he was often a substitute during the final months of his United career.

More than five years after his Old Trafford exit, a 35-year-old Cole made one last appearance for Manchester United in the UEFA Celebration Match six years later, on 13 March 2007, coming on at half-time for a friendly match between Manchester United and a European XI, in celebration of the 50th anniversary of the European Community and 50 years of Manchester United in the European Cup.

=== Blackburn Rovers ===
The arrival of Ruud van Nistelrooy and Juan Sebastián Verón counted against Cole's first-team chances at Man Utd in the 2001–02 season, and on 29 December 2001, Cole was sold to Blackburn Rovers for £8 million. Within two months of arriving, he had collected a League Cup winners medal, scoring the winning goal for Blackburn in the final against Tottenham Hotspur, who were managed by the former England manager and open critic of Cole, Glenn Hoddle. This victory meant that, in the space of seven seasons, Cole had won all four domestic trophies plus a European trophy. Cole ended the season with a total of 18 goals in all competitions, 5 for Manchester United and 13 in just 20 matches for Blackburn.

Rovers finished sixth the following season and qualified for the UEFA Cup. That campaign saw Cole reunited with Dwight Yorke, who had signed for Blackburn from Manchester United for £2 million in July 2002.

Cole had a frustrating season in 2003–04 season, as Rovers slid into the bottom half of the Premier League, finishing 15th. He scored 11 goals but his relationship with manager Graeme Souness hit rock bottom after Cole reported him to the Professional Footballers' Association ("PFA") accusing him of unfair treatment. Cole scored 37 goals in 100 appearances in all competitions for Blackburn.

=== Later career and retirement ===
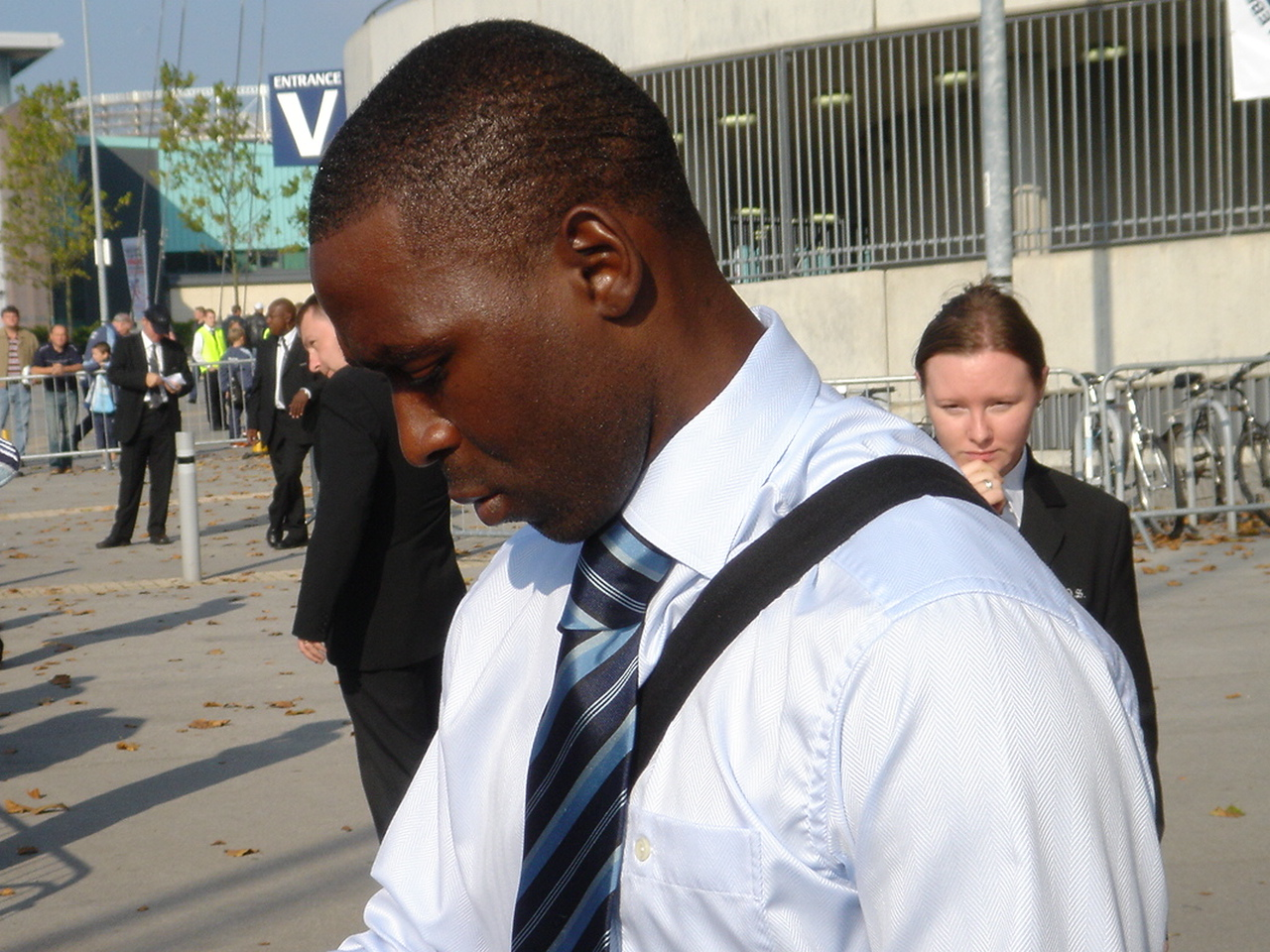
Cole signing autographs outside the City of Manchester Stadium in 2005

Thirteen years after spending a month on loan at Fulham, Cole returned to Craven Cottage for the 2004–05 season, joining them on a one-year contract. He was the club's top scorer and scored one of the goals of the season against Liverpool. Despite this successful period at Fulham, he decided to leave the club after only one season as his family wanted to return to the North West.

Cole signed for Manchester City on a free transfer at the beginning of the 2005–06 season, and enjoyed a good start to his career at Eastlands. Stuart Pearce's side spent most of the season in the top half of the table, but Cole's season was ended by injury in March.

Despite signing a new contract with Manchester City only months earlier and leaving Fulham in 2005 to return to the north, Cole signed for south coast club Portsmouth on transfer deadline day (31 August 2006) for an undisclosed fee, reported as £500,000 with the potential to rise to £1 million depending on appearances. He scored his first league goal for his new club in the 2–0 win at home to West Ham United on 14 October. However, Cole struggled to break into Harry Redknapp's side and in March 2007, he signed on loan for Birmingham City of the Championship until the end of the season. Cole returned to Portsmouth after five appearances and one goal (against Wolverhampton Wanderers) for Birmingham. He was released on 3 August 2007.

After being released by Portsmouth at the end of the 2006–07 season, Cole signed a one-year contract with Sunderland on a free transfer, reuniting him once more with former Manchester United and Blackburn Rovers strike partner Dwight Yorke, and under the management of former United teammate Roy Keane. After seven matches for the club, Cole spent three months on loan at Burnley where he scored six goals for the Championship club, including a hat-trick against Queens Park Rangers at Loftus Road. Reflecting on his time at Turf Moor, Cole stated, "I went to Burnley and spoke to Owen Coyle and got a great vibe. He brought the best out of me and made me feel a lot younger than my age." Cole was released by Sunderland at the end of the 2007–08 season.

On 4 July 2008, Cole signed a 12-month deal with Nottingham Forest, his 12th club and his local from his time growing up in Nottingham. However, on 31 October 2008, Forest confirmed Cole's contract had been cancelled by mutual consent after 11 appearances and 0 goals.

On 11 November 2008, Cole announced his retirement from football, ending a 19-year career.

== International career ==
Despite first being capped for England in 1995, Cole earned only 15 caps by the time he announced his retirement from international football after failing to be selected for the 2002 World Cup squad. He scored one goal for England, in a World Cup qualifying match against Albania in March 2001. He also scored in his single appearance for the England B team.

Glenn Hoddle, in defence of his decision not to select Cole for the World Cup in 1998, accused Cole of needing five chances to score one goal.

A persistent toe injury in the lead up to UEFA Euro 2000 led to Cole missing out on another major competition for his country.

Cole earned his first four caps under four different managers. He made his debut in a friendly against Uruguay under Terry Venables in March 1995, coming on as a substitute for Teddy Sheringham; he appeared next against Italy under Glenn Hoddle at the Tournoi de France in 1997; made his third appearance against France under caretaker Howard Wilkinson in 1999; and finally earned his fourth cap against Poland under new manager Kevin Keegan in his first starting appearance a few weeks later.

== Coaching career ==
In August 2009, Cole was hired by his former Manchester United and England teammate, Milton Keynes Dons manager Paul Ince, to coach the club's forwards on an initially temporary basis. However, one week later, Cole agreed to spend at least two days a week working on finishing with the forwards at Huddersfield Town, under his former Newcastle United and Fulham teammate Lee Clark. In December 2010, Cole was back at Manchester United, working at the Carrington training ground while finishing his coaching badges. In October 2019, Cole was named as forward and attack coach assisting manager, Sol Campbell at Southend United. On 30 June 2020, manager Campbell and his three assistants including Cole left the club by mutual consent.

== Recording career ==
In 1999, Cole signed to WEA/Warner Music and released a cover of the Gap Band's "Outstanding" which reached number 68 on the UK Singles Chart.

== Personal life ==
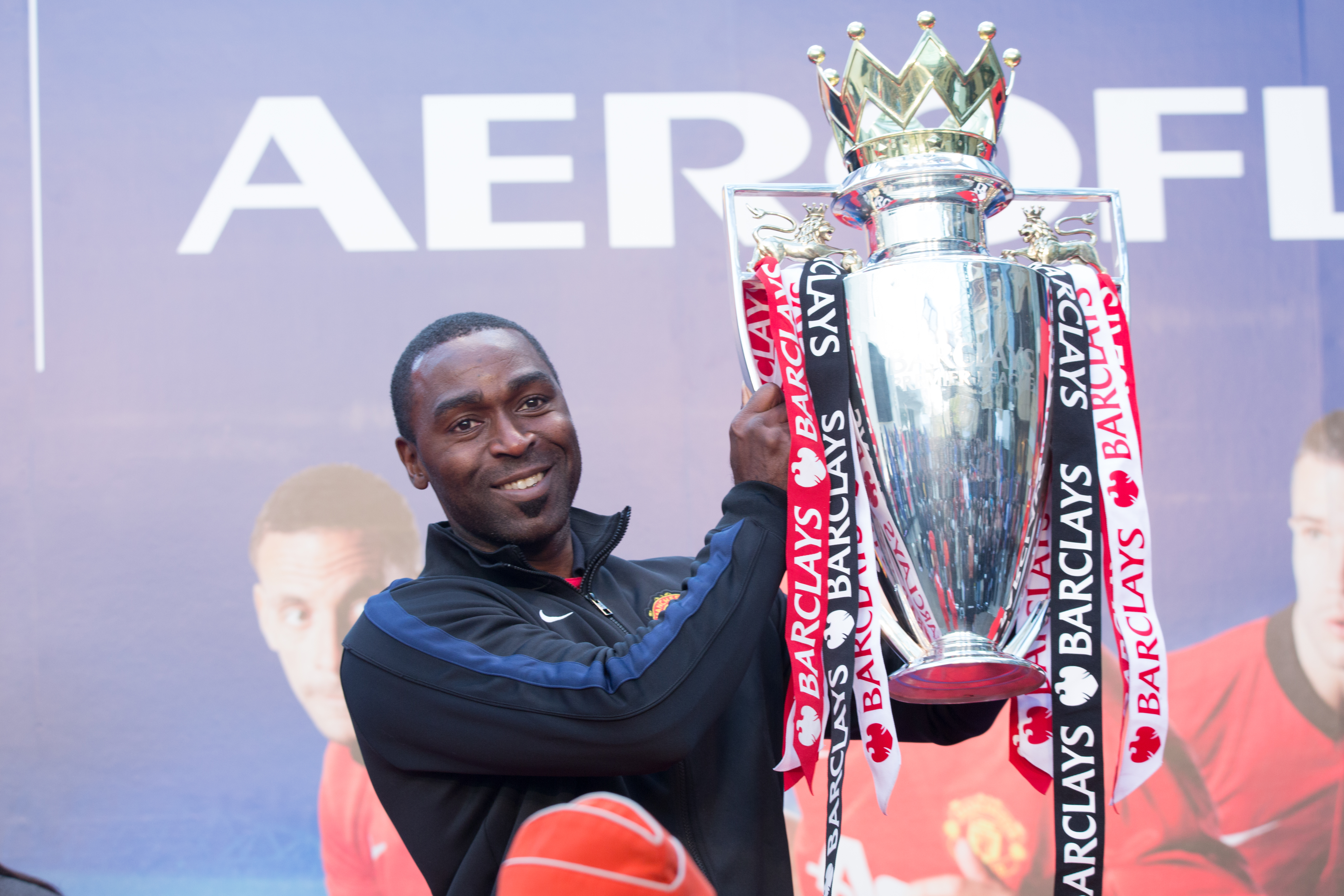
Cole representing Manchester United in Tokyo, 2014

Cole's father, Lincoln, emigrated to the UK from Jamaica in 1957 and worked as a coal miner in Gedling, Nottinghamshire, from 1965 to 1987.

Cole married his long-time girlfriend Shirley Dewar in July 2002. Their son, Devante, is also a professional footballer who plays as a forward for Luton Town.

In 2008, Cole was questioned by police after an alleged assault on his wife at their home in Alderley Edge, Cheshire, before being released on bail. Six months later, Cole, through his representative law firm Schillings, won damages in an action against the owners of the Daily Star for defamation regarding the publication of material concerning the assault allegations and for harms caused against his family by sensationalist reports.

In April 2016, Cole was named in the Panama Papers.

Cole has condemned racial incidents in football on various occasions. In a CNN interview, Cole said that football's authorities are not doing enough to fight racism in the sport and are content to "sweep it under the carpet". In another interview, he condemned an incident involving Real Madrid's Vinícius Júnior where a fan racially abused the player. Cole said that the comments from the head of La Liga, suggested a permissive attitude towards racism.

=== Health ===
In June 2014, Cole suffered kidney failure after developing focal segmental glomerulosclerosis. In April 2017, he underwent a kidney transplant. His nephew Alexander was the donor.

=== Charity work ===
In 2000, Cole visited Zimbabwe and returned to set up his own charitable foundation, called the Andy Cole Children's Foundation, which helped AIDS orphans in the country. The charity has since closed down. He has since set up the Andy Cole Fund to raise money for Kidney Research UK, after suffering kidney failure in 2015 after contracting an airborne virus.

== Career statistics ==
=== Club ===
Appearances and goals by club, season and competition
Club	Season	League			FA Cup		League Cup		Europe		Other		Total	
Club	Season	Division	Apps	Goals	Apps	Goals	Apps	Goals	Apps	Goals	Apps	Goals	Apps	Goals
Arsenal	1990–91	First Division	1	0	0	0	0	0	—		—		1	0
Arsenal	1991–92	First Division	0	0	0	0	0	0	0	0	1 (Note: Appearance in Charity Shield)	0	1	0
Arsenal	Total		1	0	0	0	0	0	0	0	1	0	2	0
Fulham (loan)	1991–92	Third Division	13	3	—		—		—		2 (Note: Appearances in Associate Members' Cup)	1	15	4
Bristol City (loan)	1991–92	Second Division	12	8	—		—		—		—		12	8
Bristol City	1992–93	First Division	29	12	1	0	3	4	—		4 (Note: Appearances in Anglo-Italian Cup)	1	37	17
Bristol City	Total		41	20	1	0	3	4	—		4	1	49	25
Newcastle United	1992–93	First Division	12	12	—		—		—		—		12	12
Newcastle United	1993–94	Premier League	40	34	3	1	2	6	—		—		45	41
Newcastle United	1994–95	Premier League	18	9	1	0	5	2	3 (Note: Appearance(s) in UEFA Cup)	4	—		27	15
Newcastle United	Total		70	55	4	1	7	8	3	4	—		84	68
Manchester United	1994–95	Premier League	18	12	—		—		—		—		18	12
Manchester United	1995–96	Premier League	34	11	7	2	1	0	1	0	—		43	13
Manchester United	1996–97	Premier League	20	6	3	0	0	0	5 (Note: Appearances in UEFA Champions League)	1	0	0	28	7
Manchester United	1997–98	Premier League	33	15	3	5	1	0	7	5	1	0	45	25
Manchester United	1998–99	Premier League	32	17	7	2	0	0	10	5	1	0	50	24
Manchester United	1999–2000	Premier League	28	19	—		0	0	13	3	4 (Note: One appearance in Charity Shield, one in UEFA Super Cup, two in FIFA Club World Championship)	0	45	22
Manchester United	2000–01	Premier League	19	9	1	0	0	0	10	4	1	0	31	13
Manchester United	2001–02	Premier League	11	4	—		0	0	4	1	0	0	15	5
Manchester United	Total		195	93	21	9	2	0	50	19	7	0	275	121
Blackburn Rovers	2001–02	Premier League	15	9	2	1	3	3	—		—		20	13
Blackburn Rovers	2002–03	Premier League	34	7	2	2	4	4	3	0	—		43	13
Blackburn Rovers	2003–04	Premier League	34	11	1	0	1	0	1	0	—		37	11
Blackburn Rovers	Total		83	27	5	3	8	7	4	0	—		100	37
Fulham	2004–05	Premier League	31	12	5	0	3	1	—		—		39	13
Manchester City	2005–06	Premier League	22	9	1	1	0	0	—		—		23	10
Portsmouth	2006–07	Premier League	18	3	2	1	2	0	—		—		22	4
Birmingham City (loan)	2006–07	Championship	5	1	—		—		—		—		5	1
Sunderland	2007–08	Premier League	7	0	1	0	0	0	—		—		8	0
Burnley (loan)	2007–08	Championship	13	6	—		—		—		—		13	6
Nottingham Forest	2008–09	Championship	10	0	0	0	1	0	—		—		11	0
Total			509	229	40	15	26	20	57	23	14	2	646	289

=== International ===
Appearances and goals by national team and year
National team	Year	Apps	Goals
England	1995	1	0
England	1996	0	0
England	1997	1	0
England	1998	0	0
England	1999	4	0
England	2000	4	0
England	2001	5	1
Total		15	1

Scores and results list England's goal tally first, score column indicates score after each Cole goal.

List of international goals scored by Andy Cole
No.	Date	Venue	Opponent	Score	Result	Competition	Ref.
1	28 March 2001	Arena Kombëtare, Tirana, Albania	Albania	3–1	3–1	2002 FIFA World Cup qualification	

== Honours ==
Arsenal

- FA Charity Shield: 1991 (shared)

Newcastle United

- Football League First Division: 1992–93

Manchester United

- Premier League: 1995–96, 1996–97, 1998–99, 1999–2000, 2000–01
- FA Cup: 1995–96, 1998–99
- FA Charity Shield: 1997
- UEFA Champions League: 1998–99

Blackburn Rovers

- Football League Cup: 2001–02

England

- Tournoi de France: 1997

Individual

- Premier League Golden Boot: 1993–94
- PFA Young Player of the Year: 1993–94
- Premier League Hall of Fame: 2024
- Newcastle United Player of the Year: 1993–94
- Premier League Player of the Month: November 1997
- PFA Team of the Year: 1999–2000 Premier League

== Relationships with other players ==
Neil Ruddock considered Cole to be the player he most enjoyed playing against. In a candid interview with Talksport, he jokingly referred to the incident that resulted in Cole suffering two broken legs in 1997 as "not big, and not clever", adding "but it was great", and that "I didn't mean to break both of his legs if I'm honest, I only meant to break one".

In 2010, Cole wrote in his column in The Independent he had "loathed" and "pretty much detested" former Manchester United and England teammate Teddy Sheringham "for 15 years" after Sheringham did not offer to shake Cole's hand as Cole was substituted on for Sheringham to make his England debut in a match against Uruguay at Wembley in 1995.
