= Karel Poborský =

Czech footballer (born 1972)

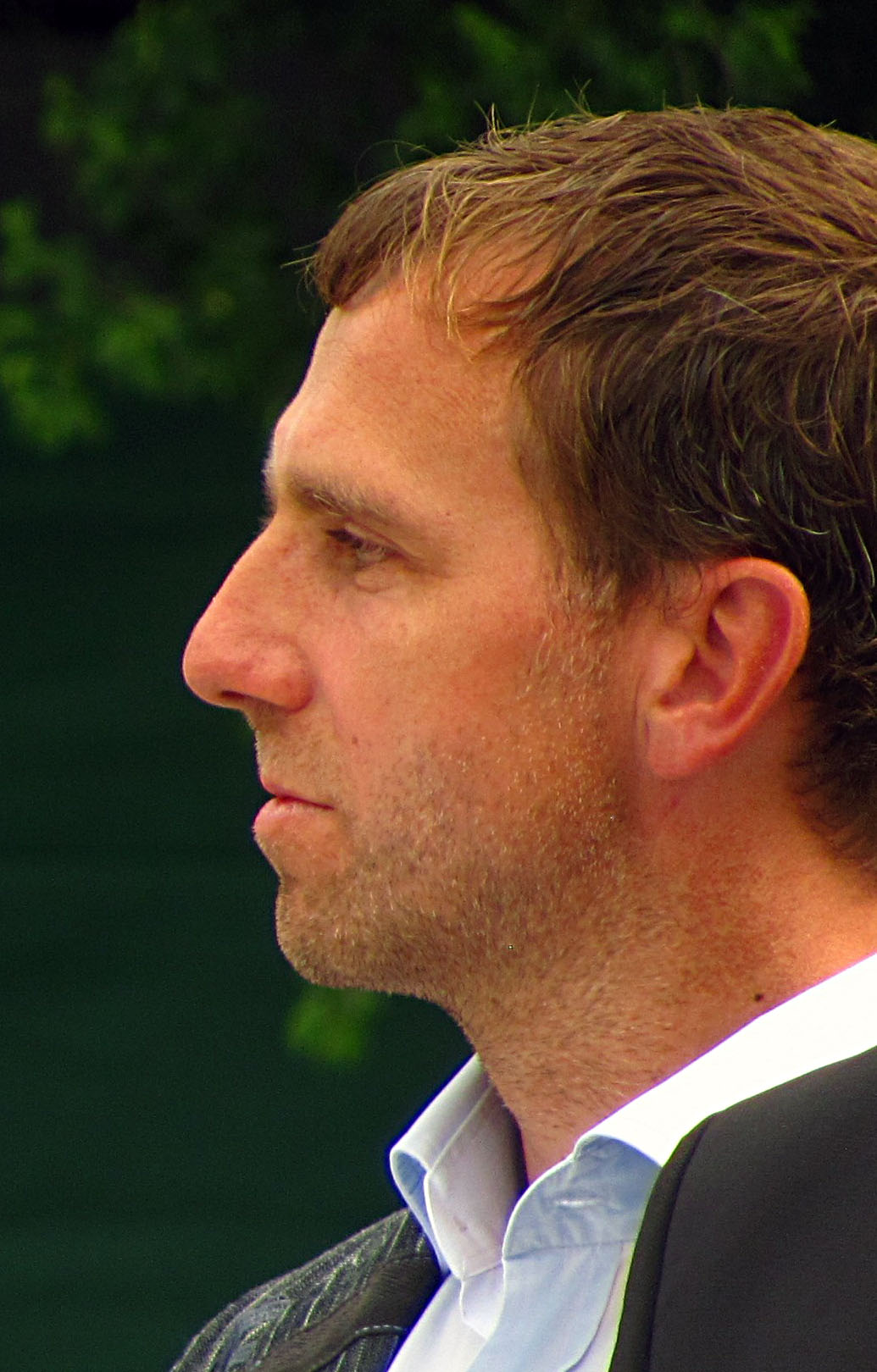
- Poborský in 2012

Personal information
- Full name: Karel Poborský
- Date of birth: 30 March 1972 (age 54)
- Place of birth: Jindřichův Hradec, Czechoslovakia
- Height: 1.74 m (5 ft 9 in)
- Position: Winger

Youth career
- 1978–1984: TJ Třeboň
- 1984–1987: České Budějovice
- 1987–1988: Jiskra Třeboň
- 1988–1990: České Budějovice

Senior career*
Years	Team	Apps	(Gls)
1991–1994	České Budějovice	82	(15)
1994–1995	Viktoria Žižkov	28	(10)
1995–1996	Slavia Prague	26	(11)
1996–1997	Manchester United	32	(5)
1997–2000	Benfica	88	(17)
2001–2002	Lazio	46	(5)
2002–2005	Sparta Prague	86	(25)
2005–2007	České Budějovice	26	(10)
Total		414	(98)

International career
1994–2006	Czech Republic	118	(8)
Medal record
Men's football
Representing Czech Republic
UEFA European Championship
Runner-up	1996 England
Bronze medal – third place	2004 Portugal
FIFA Confederations Cup
Third place	1997 Saudi Arabia
- * Club domestic league appearances and goals

Karel Poborský (Czech pronunciation: [ˈkarɛl ˈpoborskiː]; born 30 March 1972) is a Czech former professional association football player. Poborský played as a winger, and was most noted for his technical ability and pace.

Poborský began and finished his club career at Dynamo České Budějovice, where his kit number 8 is retired in his honour. He also won the Czech First League titles at Slavia and Sparta, the two largest clubs in Prague. Between these domestic triumphs, he won a Premier League title at Manchester United, and also played for Benfica and Lazio.

After Petr Čech, Poborský ranks second in appearances for the Czech national team, having appeared 118 times between 1994 and 2006. Poborský retired from international football after playing at the country's first World Cup. He also played in three European Championships and was named in the Team of the Tournament at UEFA Euro 1996 after helping the Czechs to the final.

== Club career ==
=== Early career ===
Karel Poborský made his top-flight debut for Dynamo České Budějovice in the 1991–92 Czechoslovak First League. He transferred to the Prague-based club Viktoria Žižkov in mid 1994, before moving to local rivals Slavia Prague in mid 1995.

In the 1995–96 season, Poborský led Slavia Prague to the Czech First League title and to the semi-finals of the 1995–96 UEFA Cup.

=== Manchester United ===
Poborský was one several players from the Czech national squad at UEFA Euro 1996 who after the tournament left the Czech Republic to play elsewhere. Poborský received offers from Liverpool and Lazio, but in June 1996, he signed for Manchester United for a fee of £3.5 million. He made his club debut in the 1996 FA Charity Shield against Newcastle United, appearing as a substitute for Nicky Butt in a 4–0 win. Poborský also won a Premier League title-winner's medal in the 1996–97 season, in which he played in 22 out of 38 league games and scored three goals, and helped United reach the Champions League semi-finals. Due to David Beckham's rising stardom, Poborský remained at Manchester United for one and a half seasons; in December 1997 Poborský left that club, having made only six starts that season. His last match for United was a substitute appearance against Everton on 26 December.

=== Benfica and Lazio ===
in December 1997, Poborský moved to the Portuguese side Benfica for an undisclosed fee, signing a three-and-a-half-year contract to play for the club, which was managed by Graeme Souness. Poborský played for Benfica for three years, leaving shortly after manager Toni Oliveira became the manager in December 2000.

In February 2001, Poborský joined Italian side Lazio on an 18-month contract for a transfer fee of £700,000. He scored his first goal for Lazio in a 5–3 win against Verona on 25 February 2001. On the final day of the 2001–02 Serie A season, Poborský scored twice as Lazio beat title contenders Inter Milan 4–2, causing the title to go to Juventus. He left Lazio following the expiry of his contract at the end of the season.

=== Return to Czech Republic ===
In July 2002, Poborský returned to the Czech Republic after signing as a free agent with Sparta Prague, where he became the highest-paid footballer playing in the country. During his time at Sparta, the club won the league championships in the 2002–03 and 2004–05 seasons, as well as the national cup in 2003–04.

In 2005, he returned to his first club, Dynamo České Budějovice, scoring two goals and setting up a third on the way to a 4–0 victory against Sigma Olomouc B in his first match. He retired on 28 May 2007 after playing his final match, a 2–1 home loss against Slavia Prague, another of his former sides. Dynamo České Budějovice, by which time had Poborský as a co-owner, retired his number-8 shirt.

== International career ==
Karel Poborský's first international appearance, which was against Turkey on 23 February 1994, was also the first match for the Czech Republic's national side after the dissolution of Czechoslovakia.

=== Euro 96 ===
Poborský played for his country at Euro 96, where he was one of the most valuable players of the tournament. After losing against Germany in the opening group match, a Poborský cross resulted in a goal for teammate Pavel Nedvěd in a 2–1 win against Italy. In the knockout stages of the tournament, Poborský scored his first international goal; he lobbed the ball over Portugal's advancing goalkeeper Vítor Baía, settling the game, which the Czech Republic won 1–0. The goal became a trademark shot for Poborský and that shooting style was soon attributed to him. In 2008, Poborský's 1996 lob was voted the best individual goal in the "Carlsberg goal of the day" poll on UEFA's official website.

In Czechia's semi-final against France, Poborský was among players who scored penalties in the shootout after a goalless match, which the Czech Republic won. In the final, the German defender Matthias Sammer fouled Poborský, and Patrik Berger converted the resulting penalty. Germany won the match 2–1 with a golden goal, settling the game, and the Czech Republic finished the tournament as runners-up. Poborský was given the Man of the Match award.

=== Euro 2000 ===
Poborský was part of the Czech squad at Euro 2000. He scored his country's first goal of the tournament from the penalty spot, against France in a 2–1 group-stage loss that resulted in Czechia's elimination from the championship. In the nation's final match of the group stage, against Denmark, Poborský provided the pass from which Vladimír Šmicer opened the scoring, with the game finishing 2–0.

=== Euro 2004 ===
Poborský played at Euro 2004, where he provided four assists, the tournament's highest. In his team's opening match against Latvia, Poborský kicked the ball over the crossbar in the first half before Latvia unexpectedly scored the first goal. In the second half, he made numerous crosses to teammate Milan Baroš, who in the 72nd minute converted one to equalise the match at 1–1. The match finished 2–1 after Marek Heinz scored a late winner for the Czech Republic. In Czechia's second group-stage match against the Netherlands, the Dutch side took a 2–0 lead but Poborský assisted the game-winning third Czech goal, which Vladimír Šmicer scored. The Czech Republic had already having qualified for the knockout stages of the tournament. Poborský and eight other players were rested for the final group-stage match against Germany, in which he played from the 70th minute as a substitute for Jaroslav Plašil. Czechia won the match 2–1, eliminating Germany from the competition.

At the quarter-final stage, Poborský provided two more assists as the Czech side defeated Denmark 3–0, with all of the goals coming in the second half. In the 49th minute, Jan Koller converted his corner, scoring the first goal. In the 63rd minute, a Poborský through ball found Milan Baroš, who doubled their team's advantage. Baroš later scored his second goal of the match. In the semi-finals, Czechia played against Greece; the game was Poborský's 99th for his national team. Although Poborský created two chances, the Czech Republic failed to score and lost the match after defender Traianos Dellas scored a silver goal for Greece in extra time.

=== Other international matches ===
Poborský was included in the Czech national squad for the 1997 FIFA Confederations Cup and 2006 World Cup. Following the 2006 World Cup, he announced his retirement from international football, having scored eight goals and made 118 appearances for his national team, a record at the time.

== Football administration ==
After concluding his playing career, Poborský became technical director of the Czech national team. He held the role for almost two years, resigning in April 2009. In 2011, Poborský became chairman of the newly founded Czech Association of Football Players, a member of FIFPRO. He resigned from the role in June 2013, saying the workload of his role as chairman of the board of Dynamo České Budějovice was the reason for his decision.

== Personal life ==
Karel Poborský was previously married with two children. After the breakdown of his marriage, he had another daughter. In 2013 Poborský moved from Hluboká nad Vltavou to Prague. In 2016, Poborský was put into a medically induced coma after contracting a brain infection that paralysed the muscles in his face and caused hypersensitivity to light. Poborský spent three weeks in hospital before making a full recovery, and said if he had arrived at the hospital a day later, he might have died. Poborský's nickname is Steve, after the similarly named Canadian skier Steve Podborski.

== Career statistics ==
=== Club ===
Appearances and goals by club, season and competition
Club	Season	League			National cup		League cup		Continental		Other (Note: Includes the FA Charity Shield and Supercoppa Italiana)		Total	
Club	Season	Division	Apps	Goals	Apps	Goals	Apps	Goals	Apps	Goals	Apps	Goals	Apps	Goals
České Budějovice	1991–92	Czechoslovak First League	26	0			—		—		—			
České Budějovice	1992–93	Czechoslovak First League	29	7			—		—		—			
České Budějovice	1993–94	Czech First League	27	8			—		—		—			
České Budějovice	Total		82	15			—		—		—			
Viktoria Žižkov	1994–95	Czech First League	27	10			—		4	1	—		31	11
Viktoria Žižkov	1995–96	Czech First League	1	0			—		—		—		1	0
Viktoria Žižkov	Total		28	10			—		4	1	—		32	11
Slavia Prague	1995–96	Czech First League	26	11			—		11	2	—		37	13
Manchester United	1996–97	Premier League	22	3	2	0	2	1	6	0	1	0	33	4
Manchester United	1997–98	Premier League	10	2	0	0	1	0	4	0	0	0	15	2
Manchester United	Total		32	5	2	0	3	1	10	0	1	0	48	6
Benfica	1997–98	Primeira Divisão	19	5	4	0	—		0	0	—		23	5
Benfica	1998–99	Primeira Divisão	27	6	1	0	—		8	0	—		36	6
Benfica	1999–2000	Primeira Divisão	29	5	1	0	—		6	0	—		36	5
Benfica	2000–01	Primeira Divisão	13	1	2	0	—		2	0	—		17	1
Benfica	Total		88	17	8	0	—		16	0	—		112	17
Lazio	2000–01	Serie A	19	1	0	0	—		0	0	0	0	19	1
Lazio	2001–02	Serie A	27	4	3	0	—		4	0	—		34	4
Lazio	Total		46	5	3	0	—		4	0	0	0	53	5
Sparta Prague	2002–03	Czech First League	28	7			—		8	2	—		36	9
Sparta Prague	2003–04	Czech First League	28	11			—		10	5	—		38	16
Sparta Prague	2004–05	Czech First League	24	6			—		8	1	—		32	7
Sparta Prague	2005–06	Czech First League	6	1			—		1	0	—		7	1
Sparta Prague	Total		86	25			—		27	8	—		113	33
České Budějovice	2005–06	Czech Second League	14	8			—		—		—			
České Budějovice	2006–07	Czech First League	12	2			—		—		—			
České Budějovice	Total		26	10			—		—		—			
Career total			414	98			3	1			1	0		

=== International ===
Appearances and goals by national team and year
National team	Year	Apps	Goals
Czech Republic	1994	6	0
Czech Republic	1995	5	0
Czech Republic	1996	12	1
Czech Republic	1997	9	0
Czech Republic	1998	8	0
Czech Republic	1999	11	1
Czech Republic	2000	10	2
Czech Republic	2001	11	0
Czech Republic	2002	10	1
Czech Republic	2003	8	2
Czech Republic	2004	11	0
Czech Republic	2005	10	0
Czech Republic	2006	7	1
Total		118	8

Scores and results list Czech Republic's goal tally first, score column indicates score after each Poborský goal.

List of international goals scored by Karel Poborský
No.	Date	Venue	Opponent	Score	Result	Competition
1	23 June 1996	Villa Park, Birmingham	Portugal	1–0	1–0	Euro 1996
2	8 September 1999	Na Stínadlech, Teplice	Bosnia and Herzegovina	3–0	3–0	Euro 2000 qualifying
3	16 June 2000	Jan Breydel Stadium, Bruges	France	1–1	1–2	Euro 2000
4	2 September 2000	Georgi Asparuhov Stadium, Sofia	Bulgaria	1–0	1–0	2002 World Cup qualification
5	16 October 2002	Na Stínadlech, Teplice	Belarus	1–0	2–0	Euro 2004 qualifying
6	10 September 2003	Toyota Arena, Prague	Netherlands	2–0	3–1	Euro 2004 qualifying
7	15 November 2003	Na Stínadlech, Teplice	Canada	3–0	5–1	Friendly
8	1 March 2006	İzmir Atatürk Stadium, İzmir	Turkey	1–0	2–2	Friendly

== Honours ==
Slavia Prague

- Czech First League: 1995–96

Manchester United

- Premier League: 1996–97
- FA Charity Shield: 1996

Sparta Prague

- Czech First League: 2002–03, 2004–05
- Czech Cup: 2003–04

Czech Republic

- UEFA European Championship runner-up: 1996
- FIFA Confederations Cup third place: 1997

Individual

- Czech Footballer of the Year: 1996 (shared with Patrik Berger)
- UEFA Team of the Tournament: UEFA Euro 1996
- UEFA European Championship top assist provider: 1996 (3 assists, shared with Youri Djorkaeff), 2004 (4 assists)
- Czech Footballer of the Year personality of the Czech First League: 2003, 2004, 2005

== See also ==
- List of men's footballers with 100 or more international caps

== Bibliography ==
- Jeřábek, Luboš. Ceský a ceskoslovenský fotbal - lexikon osobností a klubu Praha: Grada Publishing, 2007. 262 p. ISBN 978-80-247-1656-5
