= Stuart Brightwell =

English footballer

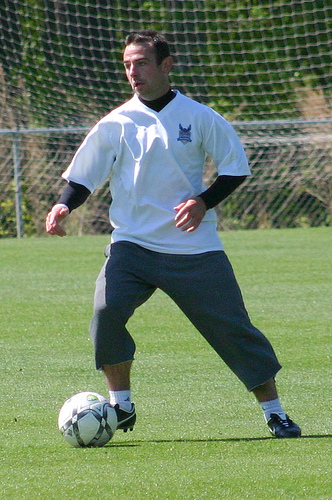

Personal information
- Full name: Stuart Brightwell
- Date of birth: 31 January 1979 (age 47)
- Place of birth: Easington, England
- Position: Midfielder

Youth career
- Manchester United

Senior career*
Years	Team	Apps	(Gls)
1996–1998	Manchester United	0	(0)
1998–1999	Hartlepool United	17	(1)
- Bishop Auckland
????–2002	Durham City		
2002–2004	Spennymoor United		
2004	Durham City		
2004	Billingham Town		
20??–2006	Hetton Lyons		(1)
2007	Carolina RailHawks	25	(1)
2008	Horden C.W.		
- * Club domestic league appearances and goals

Stuart Brightwell (born 31 January 1979) is an English former football midfielder who spent one season in the USL First Division in the USA. He last played for Horden Colliery Welfare A.F.C. in the Northern League. Currently, he works as a coach at the i2i International Soccer Academy.

Brightwell came up through the Manchester United youth system, before transferring to Hartlepool United in 1998. Brightwell played in 20 games for the Monkey Hangers. He then played for Bishop Auckland and Durham City. In November 2002, he transferred from Durham City to Spennymoor United. In the summer of 2004, he moved back to Durham City before transferring to Billingham Town on 12 October 2004.

At Hetton Lyons CC, he scored a hattrick in the FA Sunday Cup Final.

In May 2007, Brightwell signed with the Carolina RailHawks of the USL First Division. He played well, seeing extensive playing time, but was released by the team at the end of the season.
