= John Curtis (footballer, born 1978) =

English footballer

Personal information
- Full name: John Charles Keyworth Curtis
- Date of birth: 3 September 1978 (age 48)
- Place of birth: Nuneaton, England
- Height: 5 ft 10 in (1.78 m)
- Positions: Defender; midfielder

Senior career*
Years	Team	Apps	(Gls)
1997–2000	Manchester United	14	(0)
1999–2000	→ Barnsley (loan)	28	(2)
2000–2003	Blackburn Rovers	61	(0)
2003	→ Sheffield United (loan)	12	(0)
2003–2004	Leicester City	15	(0)
2004–2005	Portsmouth	7	(0)
2004	→ Preston North End (loan)	12	(0)
2005–2007	Nottingham Forest	79	(0)
2007	Queens Park Rangers	4	(0)
2009	Worcester City	0	(0)
2009	Wrexham	13	(0)
2009–2010	Northampton Town	19	(0)
2010–2011	Gold Coast United	19	(1)
Total		282	(3)

International career
1997	England U20	4	(0)
1998	England B	1	(0)

Managerial career
- 2020: Hartford Athletic (assistant)
- * Club domestic league appearances and goals

John Charles Keyworth Curtis (born 3 September 1978) is an English former professional footballer. He was a versatile defender who could play anywhere along the back four or as a defensive midfielder.

== Playing career ==
=== Manchester United ===
Born in Nuneaton, Warwickshire, Curtis began his career at Manchester United and was tipped as a huge star for the future, being part of their FA Youth Cup-winning team in 1995 (when he was still only 16 years old and in his final year of secondary school) and turning professional in 1997.

He proved himself as competent at right-back and centre-back after making his debut against Ipswich Town in the League Cup on 14 October 1997. His Premier League debut followed in a 7–0 home win over Barnsley on 25 October 1997, and he made a further six league appearances in 1997–98 as United finished second in the league, but he managed just five more league appearances before joining Division One promotion chasers Barnsley on loan on 19 November 1999, scoring twice in 28 league games as they qualified for the playoffs but lost 4–2 to Ipswich Town in the final at Wembley Stadium. The two goals he scored during his loan spell at Barnsley were the only goals he scored in his professional career. The first came against United's rivals Manchester City, and the other was scored against Port Vale.

=== Blackburn Rovers ===
Blackburn Rovers manager Graeme Souness was impressed by the young defender, and managed to prise Curtis away from Manchester United during the summer of 2000 for a fee of £1.5 million. During the next season he was a league ever-present as Blackburn were promoted to the Premier League as Division One runners-up. By this time he had also represented England at youth, Under-21 and 'B' level.

However, his 2001–02 FA Premier League campaign was hampered by the form of new signing Lucas Neill, limiting him to just 10 league appearances. He was an unused substitute in the 2002 Football League Cup Final which Blackburn won. He failed to regain his regular starting place, and spent the second half of the 2002–03 season on loan to Sheffield United. At the end of the season he was released by Blackburn on a free transfer, and was signed by Leicester City (newly promoted to the Premier League) on a two-year contract.

=== Leicester & Portsmouth ===
Curtis' spell at Leicester was an unhappy one, and after making just 17 Premier League appearances, he opted for a move to Portsmouth in February 2004, where he teamed up with Harry Redknapp.

After failing to win a regular starting place in the side, at the start of 2004–05 he was loaned to Preston North End. Preston manager Billy Davis was impressed by Curtis and offered him a permanent contract after his impressive loan spell. Upon Curtis' return to Portsmouth at the end of October, he spoke of his determination to win a regular place in the first team and get his career back on track. However, he made only five appearances under Harry Redknapp, and failed to play at all under Redknapp's successor Velimir Zajec.

=== Nottingham Forest ===
In January 2005, Curtis moved on a free transfer to Nottingham Forest, initially on a short-term contract before signing a two-year deal at the end of the season. He established himself as Forest's first-choice right-back, prompting them to offer to extend his contract by a further two years. However, Curtis rejected the offer when Forest missed out on promotion to the Championship. Shortly afterwards, Forest announced that they would not be re-offering Curtis an improved contract, and that he would therefore be free to leave after 30 June 2007.

=== Later career ===
Curtis signed for Queens Park Rangers on a free transfer on 30 June 2007. However, after the sacking of John Gregory, Curtis' first team opportunities dried up and his contract was terminated by QPR in December 2007.

Following a trial with Notts County, Curtis was badly injured and was forced to sit out the first half of the 2008–09 season. He joined Worcester City in January 2009 to gain valuable match fitness after his lengthy lay off, and then signed for Conference National side Wrexham at the end of February. He was reluctant to play in the Conference and turned down the chance of joining Wrexham for the following season. On 28 July, Curtis signed a one-year deal at Northampton Town after impressing manager Stuart Gray during a pre-season trial. He made his league debut in the defeat at Chesterfield. He was released by the club on 12 May 2010 along with five other players.

In May 2010, Curtis joined A-League club Gold Coast United on trial, signing a permanent deal with the club on 16 June. He made his debut in the home defeat against Melbourne Victory.

== Coaching career ==
Curtis is the founder and technical director of NCE Soccer (National Center of Excellence), an organisation which provides elite coaching based in Fairfield, Connecticut.

== Honours ==
Manchester United

- FA Youth Cup: 1994–95

Blackburn Rovers

- Football League First Division second-place promotion: 2000–01
- Football League Cup: 2001–02

Individual

- Jimmy Murphy Young Player of the Year: 1996–97
