= Michael Clegg (footballer) =

English footballer (born 1977)

Personal information
- Full name: Michael Jamie Clegg
- Date of birth: 3 July 1977 (age 49)
- Place of birth: Ashton-under-Lyne, England
- Height: 5 ft 8 in (1.73 m)
- Position: Defender

Team information
- Current team: Manchester United (First-team strength and power coach)

Youth career
- 1993–1995: Manchester United

Senior career*
Years	Team	Apps	(Gls)
1995–2002	Manchester United	9	(0)
2000	→ Ipswich Town (loan)	3	(0)
2000	→ Wigan Athletic (loan)	6	(0)
2002–2004	Oldham Athletic	46	(0)
Total		64	(0)

International career
1998	England U21	2	(0)
- * Club domestic league appearances and goals

Michael Jamie Clegg (born 3 July 1977) is an English football coach and former player who played as a defender.

He began his professional playing career with Manchester United in the mid-1990s. He made 24 appearances for the club between 1996 and 2001, and spent time on loan to Ipswich Town and Wigan Athletic before making a permanent move to Oldham Athletic in 2002. He made 52 appearances in two seasons with the Latics before struggles with his mental health led to his retirement at the age of 26.

== Playing career ==
Clegg, born in Ashton-under-Lyne, began his football career as a trainee with Manchester United and was part of the 1995 FA Youth Cup-winning side. He turned professional soon afterwards, and made his first-team debut on 23 November 1996, in a Premier League game away to Middlesbrough which finished as a 2–2 draw. He played in four FA Premier League games in the 1996–97 season, and although United were champions for the fourth time in five seasons it was not enough for a title winner's medal. He managed a further three appearances in 1997–98 (when United were trophyless for only the second time in the decade) before making his final two appearances in the 1999–2000 campaign, when United won their sixth title in eight seasons, but once again Clegg failed to meet the required number of appearances for a title winner's medal.

Clegg spent time on loan at Ipswich Town and Wigan Athletic before he joined Second Division club Oldham Athletic on a free transfer on 19 February 2002. In his first season, he played just 10 times as Oldham qualified for the Second Division play-offs, only to see them beaten in the semi-finals. A potential purchase of the club fell through and they went into administration, resulting in the squad being gutted to cover their debts. Clegg remained with the club and played 32 times as they finished in 15th place; however, he struggled with his mental health and retired from professional football at the end of the 2003–04 season.

== Coaching career ==
After two years out of the game, Clegg was appointed by former Manchester United team-mate Roy Keane as Sunderland's strength and conditioning coach in 2006.

On 6 July 2019, Clegg was announced as a first-team strength and power coach at Manchester United.

== Personal life ==
Clegg went to Stamford High School, Ashton-under-Lyne.

Clegg's father, Mike, was strength and conditioning coach at Manchester United from 2000 to 2011.

== Honours ==
Individual

- Denzil Haroun Reserve Team Player of the Year: 1996–97
