= Paul Gibson (footballer) =

English footballer

Personal information
- Date of birth: 1 November 1976 (age 49)
- Place of birth: Sheffield, England
- Position: Goalkeeper

Youth career
- Manchester United

Senior career*
| Years | Team | Apps | (Gls) |
| 1995–1999 | Manchester United | 0 | (0) |
| 1996 | → Halifax Town (loan) | 15 | (0) |
| 1997 | → Mansfield Town (loan) | 25 | (0) |
| 1998 | → Hull City (loan) | 6 | (0) |
| 1999–2001 | Notts County | 40 | (0) |
| 2000 | → Rochdale (loan) | 6 | (0) |
| 2001–2002 | Northwich Victoria | 54 | (0) |
| Total | | 146 | (0) |
- * Club domestic league appearances and goals

Paul Gibson (born 1 November 1976) is an English former professional footballer who played as a goalkeeper, most notably for Manchester United.

Gibson was part of the 1995 FA Youth Cup winning side, and became a professional shortly afterwards. He spent four years at Old Trafford after this, but never managed to play a first team game, however was an unused substitute on several occasions. He did manage to come on as a substitute for Raimond Van Der Gouw in the Brian McClair testimonial against Celtic in April 1997. He left the club in 1999. During his time at United, he had loan spells at Halifax Town, Mansfield Town and Hull City.

On his departure from Old Trafford, he signed for Notts County in Division Two, making 40 appearances in two seasons before dropping out of the Football League to sign for Nationwide Conference side Northwich Victoria. During his time at Notts County, he had a loan spell at Rochdale.

He was at Northwich Victoria for over a year and played 54 games in the Nationwide Conference before leaving halfway through the 2002–03 season.
