= John O'Kane =

English footballer

Personal information
- Full name: John O'Kane
- Date of birth: 15 November 1974 (age 51)
- Place of birth: Nottingham, England
- Position: Defender

Senior career*
Years	Team	Apps	(Gls)
1993–1998	Manchester United	2	(0)
1995	→ Wimbledon (loan)	0	(0)
1996	→ Bury (loan)	4	(2)
1997	→ Bury (loan)	9	(1)
1997	→ Bradford City (loan)	7	(0)
1998–1999	Everton	14	(0)
1998	→ Burnley (loan)	8	(0)
1999	→ Bolton Wanderers (loan)	2	(0)
1999–2001	Bolton Wanderers	36	(2)
2001–2003	Blackpool	52	(4)
2003–2006	Hyde United	116	(9)
Total		250	(19)
- * Club domestic league appearances and goals

John Andrew O'Kane (born 15 November 1974) is an English former professional footballer who played as a defender.

He started his career with Manchester United but failed to break into the first team, and after loan spells with Wimbledon, Bury, and Bradford City, he made a permanent move to Everton in January 1998. There he found first-team opportunities easier to come by, but a change of manager at the end of the 1997–98 season meant he fell out of favour again and was sent on loan to Burnley at the start of the 1998–99 season. He went on loan again to Bolton Wanderers at the start of 1999–2000, a move that was made permanent a month later.

After two years with Bolton, he moved to Blackpool, where he spent another two years before retiring due to injury. He came out of retirement again soon after to play for Hyde United, where he spent a further three seasons before his final retirement in 2006.

== Career ==
He began his professional career at Manchester United in 1990 and played 7 competitive games for the club before signing for Everton in January 1998. His last appearance for United was on 27 November 1996 when he played against Leicester City in the League Cup

O'Kane was a member of United's FA Youth Cup winning side in 1991–92. On the introduction of squad numbers in the FA Premier League for the 1993–94 season, he was issued with the number 30 shirt, and then with the number 24 shirt from the start of the 1996–97 season. He had a brief loan spell at Wimbledon in 1995, featuring in their makeshift squad for the 1995 UEFA Intertoto Cup along with fellow United players Michael Appleton and Graeme Tomlinson. O'Kane played in the Champions League, FA Cup and League Cup for Manchester United.

He was finally sold from Old Trafford after refusing another contract, in the 1997–98 season for a fee around £1 million, 14 months after his last appearance, when Howard Kendall signed him for Everton. He had more chance of first team football at Goodison Park and was a regular starter. O'Kane helped Everton stay in the league on the last day of the season against Coventry City in 1998. Howard Kendall got the sack and Walter Smith was his replacement. O'Kane wasn't given a chance of further development and fell out of favour and handed in a transfer immediately.

He joined Bolton Wanderers in November 1999, along with Everton teammate Gareth Farrelly, and after both made the move to the Reebok Stadium permanent they helped Wanderers back to the Premier League, via the play-offs.

He made his final senior appearance at the age of 28 for Blackpool in 2002–03. He captained them and helped them secure promotion and the 2001–02 Football League Trophy, before retirement through injury. O'Kane signed for non-League Hyde United, where he remained until retiring completely in 2006, and captained them to the double double.

== Personal life ==
O'Kane has been diagnosed as autistic and has worked in the care sector. He has written a book titled "Bursting The Bubble-Autism and Me".

== Honours ==
Bury

- Football League Second Division: 1996–97

Blackpool

- Football League Trophy: 2001–02
