= Robert Trees =

English footballer

Personal information
- Full name: Robert Victor Trees
- Date of birth: 18 December 1977 (age 48)
- Place of birth: Manchester, England
- Position: Midfielder

Youth career
- 1994–1996: Manchester United

Senior career*
Years	Team	Apps	(Gls)
1996–1998	Manchester United	0	(0)
1997–1998	→ Stalybridge Celtic (loan)	24	(1)
1998–2001	Bristol Rovers	46	(1)
1999	→ Altrincham (loan)	2	(0)
2000–2001	→ Leigh RMI (loan)	7	(0)
2001	Leigh RMI	16	(0)
2001–2002	Droylsden	?	(?)
2002–2003	Mossley	?	(?)
2003	Hyde United	1	(0)
2003–2005	Abbey Hey	?	(?)
2005–2006	FC United of Manchester	0	(0)
- * Club domestic league appearances and goals

Robert Trees (born 18 December 1977) is an English former footballer. Born in Manchester, England, he began his career as a youth player with his hometown club Manchester United. After a loan spell at Stalybridge Celtic, he moved to Bristol Rovers in 1998, where he scored one goal in 60 league appearances. Trees also had loan spells at Altrincham for a couple of months in 1999, and at Leigh RMI. Leigh signed him on a permanent basis in February 2001, but he soon moved on to Droylsden in August of the same year. Trees played for Mossley during the 2002–03 season, but personal issues forced him to take a short break from football in September 2002. He then joined Hyde United in the summer of 2003, but his spell there was short-lived and he moved to Abbey Hey that December. After 18 months with Abbey Hey, Trees joined the newly formed F.C. United of Manchester in July 2005 and was part of the club's initial 20-man squad for their 2005–06 pre-season. However, he never played in a senior game for them. He now has 2 children Francesca and Gabriella Trees with his wife Sharon Trees. Trees played for Witton Albion prior to joining Bristol Rovers, making his debut on 8 March 1998, playing 11 games and scoring one goal.
