= Journalism, Media and Communication, University of Central Lancashire =

UCLan School of Journalism - UK

School of Journalism, Media and Communication, University of Central Lancashire
- Established: 1962
- Academic staff: 70+
- Location: Preston, UK
- Website: uclan.ac.uk

The School of Journalism, Media and Communication at the University of Central Lancashire (UCLan) is one of the UK's longest established centres of journalism teaching, growing out of the Harris College, Preston.

Undergraduate and postgraduate courses are accredited by the Broadcast Journalism Training Council, the National Council for the Training of Journalists and the Periodicals Training Council, the training arm of the Periodical Publishers Association.

The school is widely considered to be one of the most prestigious schools for journalists and media professionals in the UK, with The Times describing the school "as one of the leading centres for the teaching of journalism in Britain". In 2010, the University won the Broadcast Journalism Training Council's award for general excellence. In 2022, The Guardian University Guide ranked UCLan's journalism courses as the best in England; in the same year, the journalism degree was recognised as the top-performing undergraduate programme by the National Council for the Training of Journalists.

== History ==
The School of Journalism, Media and Communication grew out of the Harris College, Preston, which launched its first print journalism course in 1962. The college later became part of Preston Polytechnic. In 1982, the first postgraduate diploma in Broadcast Journalism was launched with support from the BBC and ITV, followed by a postgraduate diploma in Newspaper Journalism. The undergraduate degree in journalism was launched in 1991, before the polytechnic became the University of Central Lancashire.

The School now includes six divisions. They are Journalism, Film and Media Studies, Media Technology, Language and Linguistics, Literature and Cultures, and Media Practice.

== Faculty ==
The Head of the School is Mike Ward, a former BBC journalist and author of "Journalism Online".

Honorary Fellows include Mark Thompson, Richard Frediani (Head of News at Granada), Lucy Meacock, Kate Adie, Anna Ford and Fiona Armstrong.

A notable feature of the School is the Harris lecture series, which regularly brings senior media figures to Preston, including Jon Snow, Janet Street-Porter, Simon Kelner, The Independent editor Chris Blackhurst, Evening Standard editor Geordie Greig, Kim Fletcher, Stephen Mitchell (journalist) and Andrew Jennings.

== Notable alumni ==
- Anthony Baxter, BBC producer
- Polly Billington, journalist and special adviser to Ed Miliband
- Angelique Chrisafis, Paris correspondent, The Guardian
- Isioma Daniel, Nigerian and Norwegian journalist
- Victoria Derbyshire, broadcaster on BBC Radio 5 Live
- Nina Hossain, ITV News broadcaster
- Simon Kelner, Editor of The Independent
- Rob McCaffrey, Sky Sports presenter
- Alistair Mann, Match of the Day commentator
- Ian Payne, Sky sports broadcaster
- Brent Sadler, CNN correspondent
- Ranvir Singh, BBC Radio 5 Live and television presenter
- John Stapleton, television presenter on Watchdog and many others
- Mark Tattersall, television presenter Granada Reports
- William Watt, 2010 Digital Journalist of the Year
- Kerry Wilkinson UK number one best-selling author
- Thomas Gardner, Film Director and Producer
