= Dave Clark (television presenter) =

British television presenter

- Born: David Clark; Ilkley, West Yorkshire, England
- Education: Jordanhill College of Education
- Occupation: television presenter
- Years active: 1998-2020
- Television: PDC World Darts Championship; Sky Sports News

Dave Clark is a former television presenter from Ilkley, West Yorkshire, England who worked for British television station Sky Sports from 1998 until 2020, where he was the anchorman for boxing and darts coverage.

== Career ==
Clark was a presenter on Capital Gold radio's football, Olympics and Wimbledon tennis coverage from 1990. He also presented a nightly football phone-in "Capital Gold Sportstime" and "The Dave Clark Show". He left Capital in 1998 to join Sky Sports News upon its launch.

Alongside his presentation on the rolling sports news channel, Sky Sports News, Clark also spent a year hosting the football phone-in You're On Sky Sports. Dave has fronted snooker and pool coverage as well as Soccer Saturday and Soccer AM.

Clark began presenting Sky's boxing coverage on a shared basis with Paul Dempsey, until Dempsey left for Setanta Sports. He's been the frontman for several big fights for the likes of David Haye, Amir Khan and Ricky Hatton. Clark replaced Jeff Stelling as darts presenter and covers all of the PDC's major televised tournaments, as well as the Premier League.

On 12 July 2020, Dave announced his retirement from Sky Sports live commentating.

== Fight with Parkinson's ==
Clark was diagnosed with Parkinson's disease in 2011 and has been public about his fight with the disease. His father also suffered from the disease and severe depression connected to the disease. During the 2018 PDC World Darts Championship, in a tweet Ladbrokes Coral uploaded a photo of him and wrote: "Dave Clark looks like he's caught the whiff of something nasty & wants to murder the person who's caused it ... #LoveTheDarts." Clark responded with a screen grab of Ladbrokes' post alongside the message: "That'll be the chronic degenerative neurological condition that will eventually rob me of the ability to walk, talk and smile @Ladbrokes #parkinsons".Alan Shearer along with others expressed support for Clark tweeting "Wow! Two people tweeting. One is a gentleman, who inspires us all. The other a little prat on a keyboard hoping for a cheap laugh. I know who I stand with. You're an inspiration Dave. F**k them. Keep doing yourself and everyone else proud. #parkinsons #hero". Ladbrokes later deleted the tweet and apologised to Clark.

Clark is a Leeds United fan.
