= Collaborator =

Collaborator or collaborators may refer to:

- Collaborators, people working in collaboration with others for a common goal
- Collaborator, a person working with an enemy occupier against one's own country, known as collaborationism

== Books ==
- Collaborators (play), a 2011 British play
- Collaborator (novel), a 2003 alternate history novel by Murray Davies
- The Collaborator, by S. L. Stebel 1968
- The Collaborator, by Gerald Seymour 2011
- The Collaborator (Mirza Waheed novel) 2011
- The Collaborator, by Margaret Leroy 2011

== Film and television ==
=== Film ===
- Collaborator (film), a 2011 comedy-drama film written and directed by Martin Donovan
- The Collaborators (film), a 2015 independent British film

=== TV ===
- "The Collaborator" (Star Trek: Deep Space Nine), a 1994 second-season episode of Star Trek: Deep Space Nine
- "Collaborators" (Battlestar Galactica), third episode of season 3 of Battlestar Galactica
- "Collaborators" (Mad Men), season 6, episode 3 of Mad Men
- The Collaborators (TV series), a Canadian police television drama

== Other uses ==
- Collaborator (album), a 1994 album by Djam Karet
- Collaborator (software), an enterprise-grade software tool for development teams conducting peer code reviews
- The Collaborators, a Melbourne alternative band headed by Jack Holt (musician)

== See also ==
- Collaboration (disambiguation)
- Collaborative learning
- Collaborative method
