= Goals on Sunday =

Football television series, broadcast on Sky Sports

- Genre: Talk show, Sport
- Presented by: Alex Scott; Chris Kamara
- Country of origin: United Kingdom
- Original language: English

Production
- Production location: Studio 1, Sky Studios; Osterley, London (2017–2020)
- Running time: 90 minutes (inc. adverts)

Original release
- Network: Sky Sports
- Release: 2000 – 2020

Goals on Sunday is a British football discussion television programme on Sky Sports that shows highlights and analysis of the Premier League, Scottish Premiership and Football League Championship matches, broadcast between 2000 and 2020. The programme was shown every Sunday and Bank Holiday Monday (under the name Soccer Extra), the programme is fronted by Alex Scott and Chris Kamara. The show also featured a rotation of various guest analysts from the world of football.

The show has been praised for being more humorous and low-key than the rest of Sky's football coverage. However, The Daily Telegraph heavily criticised the programme by deeming it as "inane" and "presently brainless".

== History ==
Kamara has formerly co-presented the show with Ian Payne, Rob McCaffrey, Clare Tomlinson and Ben Shephard.

Tomlinson left the show in October 2007 and was replaced until the end of the season by Paul Boardman with a handful of appearances from Jeff Stelling.

Ian Payne was confirmed as Kamara's new co-presenter ahead of the 2008-09 season, and his arrival coincided with the show's new set and titles. Payne left the show in 2010 and was replaced by Ben Shephard.

On 28 June 2019, Ben Shephard announced his departure from Goals on Sunday to allow him to spend more time with his family, effectively ending his time at Sky Sports. On 1 August 2019, Sky Sports announced that former Arsenal W.F.C. and England footballer Alex Scott would be Kamara's new co-host.

The show's theme tune was previously the Etta James version of "A Sunday Kind of Love".

== Current presenters ==
- Chris Kamara (2000–2020)
- Alex Scott (2019–2020)
- Laura Woods (stand-in presenter) (2019–2020)

== Former presenters ==
- Rob McCaffrey (2000–2007)
- Clare Tomlinson (2007)
- Paul Boardman (2007–2008)
- Jeff Stelling (stand in; 2007–2008)
- Ian Payne (2008–2010)
- Ben Shephard (2010–2019)
