= Chicken Rhythms =

Studio album by Northside
- Released: June 17, 1991
- Recorded: The Windings Studio
- Genre: Madchester
- Length: 46:54
- Label: Factory, Geffen
- Producer: Ian Broudie

Chicken Rhythms is the only full-length studio album by English band Northside. It was released in 1991 and was produced by Ian Broudie.

The songs "Shall We Take a Trip" and "Moody Places" were used as the theme tune on Granada Soccer Night between 1990 and 1992.

== Track listing ==
1. Take 5 (4:12)
2. Weight of Air (5:55)
3. Funky Munky (3:11)
4. A Change is on its Way (5:13)
5. Yeah Man (4:55)
6. Tour de World (3:41)
7. Wishful Thinking (4:18)
8. Shall We Take a Trip (4:25)
9. Who's to Blame (3:34)
10. Practise Makes Perfect (3:00)
11. My Rising Star (4:22) (CD only)

== Charts ==
Chart performance for Chicken Rhythms
| Chart (2025) | Peak position |
|---|---|
| Scottish Albums (OCC) | 68 |
