= Sportsline (Sky News) =

Sports magazine broadcast on Sky News

- Created by: Sky News
- Opening theme: Sky Sports News theme
- Country of origin: United Kingdom

Production
- Production location: Sky Studios, Osterley, London
- Camera setup: Multi-camera

Original release
- Network: Sky News
- Release: 1 January 1994 – present

Sportsline is a sports news magazine broadcast on the United Kingdom rolling news channel Sky News. The programme is broadcast on weekends from 19:30–20:00 (UK) following Sky News. The programme may be pre-empted by live coverage of ongoing events if this is required. The programme is usually fronted by one of the channel's sports reporters, or a presenter from Sky Sports News.

Supplementing Sportsline, Sky News introduced, at an unknown point of time, "Saturday Sport," which features a round-up of the week's major sports news. It was broadcast on Saturday at 11:30am.

Outside of Sportsline, Sky News provides sports headlines as part of the top- and bottom-of-the-hour headlines, and bulletins at :20 and :50 past the hour excluding All Out Politics, Sophy Ridge on Sunday, The Pledge and Press Preview. Sunrise, Sky's breakfast programme, featured a separate sports reporter in the same studio as the other presenters, typically presenting a sports bulletin each hour along with the "back pages" as part of the paper review on weekends. Sky News @ Breakfast also features a separate sports reporter from Friday–Sunday, who typically presents a sports bulletin at approximately :20 past each hour.

Sky also operates a rolling sports news channel, Sky Sports News, which covers sports news, analysis and results 24/7.
