= The Devil's Dinner Party =

British reality game show

- Genre: Reality game show
- Created by: Nell Butler; Tim Miller
- Presented by: Pip Torrens
- Country of origin: United Kingdom
- Original language: English
- No. of series: 1
- No. of episodes: 20

Production
- Production location: Sky Campus
- Running time: 60 minutes (inc. adverts)
- Production company: ITV Studios

Original release
- Network: Sky Atlantic
- Release: 23 November 2011 – 4 April 2012

The Devil's Dinner Party is a British reality game show hosted by Pip Torrens. It aired on Sky Atlantic from 23 November 2011 to 4 April 2012.

== Premise ==
According to a piece in The Times newspaper, The Devil's Dinner Party was invented to examine the psychology of middle-class dinner parties. It was advertised to Radio Times as appealing to fans of the Channel 4 gameshow Come Dine with Me, due to the two shows sharing production companies, and the food element of the show. However, there is no cookery involved in the programme.

== Format ==
The set-up of the show is similar to Come Dine with Me, with six guests invited to a dinner party, but this is where the similarities end. After briefly meeting each other, the guests have to vote off another contestant based on their first impression. The five remaining guests sit at a dining table, where they are brought food and drink. In each of the first five rounds, an individual guest has to leave the table and answer a question written on a card. The four sitting at the table are then asked the same question, and try to come up with the same answer as the challenger. An initial prize-pot of £1000 has another £1000 added in each round if the responses match, otherwise it remains the same. After all five guests have answered a question, the diners have to choose a card, and the one with a marked card has to declare their favourite and least favourite fellow guest, with the latter leaving the party.

In the final round there is one more opportunity to add to the money, as one of the guests is chosen at random to answer a question. The final four then rate their fellow contestants and the person with the highest rating wins the prize money, up to a maximum of £7000.

== Broadcast ==
The programme is produced by ITV Studios but was picked up by the satellite broadcaster British Sky Broadcasting and began airing on Sky Atlantic and in high definition on Sky Atlantic HD from 23 November 2011 to 4 April 2012.

It is the first gameshow to be shown on the channel, and part of Sky's commitment to have a role in the production of British television shows, following on from This is Jinsy, Trollied and Spy amongst others.

== International versions ==
Region/Country	Local title	Title translation	Network	Host	Premiere
Serbia	Đavolja večera	The Devil's Dinner	RTV Pink	Slađana Slavković; Jovana Švonja	4 September 2012
