= Ian Payne (sports broadcaster) =

British sports broadcaster (born 1962)

Ian Payne (born 16 December 1962) is a British broadcaster. He is currently the host of early breakfast 4am–7am current affairs phone-in show on LBC. He previously worked as a presenter for BBC Radio 5 Live, ITV and Sky Sports.

== Early life and education ==
Payne was born in Germany on 16 December 1962. His father, Peter Payne, is a consultant obstetrician and gynaecologist. He was educated at Radley College, Abingdon, an independent school, and then at Royal Holloway College and Lancashire Polytechnic. Before embarking on his broadcasting career, he worked as a teacher, a dustman and a hospital laundry assistant.

== Career ==
=== Early BBC career ===
Payne began his career in 1986 working as a trainee journalist on BBC Radio Lancashire, a position in which he won an award as Northwest Young Journalist of the Year. In 1988 he was promoted to a national role in the BBC Radio network's sport division, initially as a producer on Radio 2 and then in a variety of programmes including Radio 4's Today. His profile became even higher when he moved to BBC Radio 5 Live, where he presented coverage of major events such as the FA Cup Final and the finals of Rugby League and Rugby Union championships and fronted Sport on 5, the channel's flagship offering. In 2000 he became the presenter of 5 Live's weekday afternoon show. His work for the BBC won him two Sony Radio Awards.

=== Sky Sports ===
Payne joined Sky in 2003 initially presenting Monday Night Football. He was replaced by Jeff Stelling from the start of the 2005–06 season. He presented FA Cup coverage during 2005–06, and the League Cup from 2003 to 2006. Following Rob McCaffrey's departure from Sky, Payne hosted Gillette Soccer Special on Tuesdays and Wednesdays, before taking over as anchor of Goals on Sunday.

=== Return to BBC ===
Payne returned to Radio 5 Live in June 2010, again mainly presenting 5 Live Sport, as well as standing in on Up All Night, Tony Livesey's programme, and Weekend Breakfast.

In addition, Payne presented Scores, a Saturday sports programme on LBC, and also contributed to LBC's blog. Payne also presented the London and South East edition of the BBC Football League programme Late Kick Off in March 2011.

As a freelance, on 5 November 2010 Payne crossed National Union of Journalists picket lines to present a BBC Breakfast radio programme that was broadcast on 5 Live, Radio Ulster and Radio Scotland. He also crossed NUJ picket lines to present 5 Live Breakfast with Julia Bradbury on 15 July 2011.

=== ITV News ===
On 2 September 2013, Payne became the new ITV News Sports Correspondent.

=== Other TV work ===
In June 2012, Payne started presenting on Sports Tonight Live, a sports television channel that broadcast on Primetime Channel 498 on Sky. Payne continued to work for the station from the start of the 2012–13 football season, presenting every Tuesday and Wednesday night from 7–10pm alongside his regular guest, former Arsenal midfielder Perry Groves.

=== LBC ===
Payne presented Scores on Global Radio's LBC, a sports based talk show which aired from 3pm to 6:30pm on Saturday afternoons. In 2015, Payne's show was changed from being sports based to being a news phone-in discussion programme, with the new time of 3pm to 6pm on Saturdays.

In April 2018, Payne's show moved to the 'Early Breakfast' timeslot of 4am to 7am on Saturdays.

From 2018, Payne presented a Saturday and Sunday afternoon show 3–6pm, and was also a cover presenter for Saturday Breakfast and other weekday shows across the LBC network.

From 2020, Payne presented drive on LBC News between 4–7pm Monday – Wednesday, and from September 2020 also presented the Saturday morning show from 4–7am and the Sunday afternoon show from 4–7pm, also working as a cover presenter on the LBC network.

In August 2022, Payne began a new Monday to Thursday late-night phone-in programme, between 10pm and 1am, replacing Tom Swarbrick who moved to the Drivetime programme.

In February 2023, Payne moved from late night, replacing Steve Allen on weekday mornings 4am–7am, with a phone in programme.

== Personal life ==
Payne is a fan of Leeds United. He resides in Brentford, West London.
