= Stan's World Cup Song =

2006 song by Stan Boardman

Single by Stan Boardman
- Released: May 29, 2006
- Genre: Comedy
- Length: 3:27
- Label: Harkit Records
- Songwriter: Stan Boardman

"Stan's World Cup Song", also known as "Aye Aye Ippy The Germans Bombed Our Chippy", is a song by English comedian Stan Boardman. It is set to the tune of "She'll Be Coming 'Round the Mountain" and the Dam Busters March. It was released to coincide with the 2006 FIFA World Cup.

== History ==
Boardman came up with the idea of writing his own World Cup song because he thought that some of them were "lousy". He then wrote the song and designed a CD cover for it and contacted a friend of his to help record it. The song was first performed in Liverpool on 28 April 2006. Boardman stated that if the song made it to no. 1 in the UK charts, he would donate half of the profits to charity. The song's line "The Germans bombed our chippy" was based on a real incident when Boardman's local fish and chip shop was destroyed by a bomb dropped by the Luftwaffe in the Liverpool Blitz.

== Charts ==
The song was released in late May 2006. It made its debut in the UK Singles Chart at 19 before rising to 15 the next week. The song initially placed above England's official World Cup song World at Your Feet. In the UK Indie Chart, the song reached number 1 in the week beginning 5 June 2006.

== Reception ==
The Football Association received the song negatively because they didn't want to support any song perceived as "anti-German". It was reported that Liverpool players Jamie Carragher and Steven Gerrard with former Liverpool player, Michael Owen sang the song during an England national football team training camp coach. Singer Tony Christie described the song as "just a vehicle for Stan and his German 'jokes'". In 2010, Boardman released an updated version of Stan's World Cup Song entitled "Stan's World Cup Song – Africa 2010" for the 2010 FIFA World Cup, with the CD sales going to Help for Heroes.
