= Northside (band) =

British band

- Northside performing in Bristol in 2025

Background information
- Origin: Manchester, England
- Genres: Alternative rock, Madchester
- Years active: 1989–1992, 2006–2008, 2013–present
- Labels: Factory Records (1990-1992); Venture Records (2026-present)
- Members: Warren “Dermo” Dermody; Cliff Ogier; Rob Glennie; Andrew “Bod” Smith
- Past members: Timmy Walsh; Paul Walsh; Michael Upton; Spencer Birtwistle; Danny Yates; Dom Morrison

Northside are an English alternative rock band from Blackley and Moston in north Manchester, England. Formed in 1989, they released their only album, Chicken Rhythms, on Factory Records in 1991. The band became part of the 1990s Madchester/baggy/indie-rave scene.

== Career ==
Northside was formed by Warren "Dermo" Dermody (vocals/lyrics) and Cliff Ogier (bass). They were later joined by Michael Upton (guitar) and Paul Walsh (drums). Upton was replaced by Timmy Walsh before the release of their first single, "Shall We Take a Trip".

=== Chart success ===
"Shall We Take a Trip" was banned by the BBC for its many references to drugs (specifically LSD), but despite the lack of airplay it eventually broke into the Top 50 in the UK Singles Chart.

The next single from Chicken Rhythms, "My Rising Star", was released in October 1990 and reached No. 32, staying on the chart for 7 weeks.

The album itself peaked at No. 19 in June 1991. It was produced by Ian Broudie.

In 1991, Northside scored a minor hit in the United States when their single "Take 5" reached No. 5 on the Billboard Alternative Songs chart for the week of 5 October. It also reached No. 34 on the Dance/Club Play Songs charts that same month. The band performed "Take 5" on Top of the Pops on 6 June 1991, a rare occasion where a song that was not in the Top 40 was played on the show. That week the single was at No. 41 and would peak at No. 40.

=== Second album and breakup ===
A second album was recorded, with a planned release date and a catalogue number for the first single "Want a Virgin", however Northside's label Factory Records declared bankruptcy in November 1992 and the band split up.

=== Post-split ===
In 2003, Dermo and Ogier formed the band Silent Partners, with drummer Malc Law and guitarist Danny Yates; however Ogier left and was replaced by Dom Morrison. The band toured extensively in the UK, opening for Happy Mondays.

Drummer Paul Walsh went on to record and tour with Manchester rock outfit Sons of the Stage, releasing an independent LP, Angel Hill.

In 2006, Northside played gigs in Leeds and Manchester, however singer Dermo was the only returning original member. Chicken Rhythms was also re-issued in 2006 on LTM Recordings.

In 2006, BBC 6 Music played the song "Shall We Take a Trip" in its entirety on the Marc Riley show, and again on the Steve Lamacq show in 2016 as part of the My Generation series on 1989. "Shall We Take a Trip" was also used as Granada's Soccer Night theme tune throughout the 1990s.

Dermo formed V Thirteen in March 2011 with Matt Rynn, Doug McCloud and Miz DeShannon. V Thirteen is named after a song by Big Audio Dynamite.

=== Reunion ===
In late 2013, Northside announced that they were reforming with all four original members. They toured England in April and May 2014.

In 2017, Dermo went solo with his debut single "Vultures" on Eromeda Records.

Tim Walsh worked as a sound engineer for 25 years, on shows such as Brookside and Hollyoaks. He died on 19 August 2019.

Northside were due to support the Happy Mondays on their 2026 UK tour but had to pull out as Dermo was hospitalised with a heart attack.

On 24 June 2026, it was announced that Northside had signed to Venture Records with plans for a new album in 2027. On 30 October, they released their first single in over thirty years titled "HEY! MR BROWN".

== Selected discography ==
Vinyl Releases on Factory Records:

=== Albums ===
- 1991: Chicken Rhythms – UK No. 19

=== Singles ===
- 1990: "Shall We Take a Trip" / "Moody Places" FAC 268 (12")
- 1990: "Shall We Take a Trip" / "Moody Places" FAC 268/7 (7") – UK No. 50
- 1990: "My Rising Star"* / Instrumental FAC 298 (12")
- 1990: "My Rising Star" / Instrumental FAC 298/7 (7") – UK No. 32
- 1991: "Take 5"* / "Who's to Blame" (Instrumental) FAC 308 (12")
- 1991: "Take 5" / "Who's to Blame" (Instrumental) FAC 308-7 (7") – UK No. 40

* longer version.

=== Videos ===
- 1991: "Live"

=== Music videos ===
- "Shall We Take a Trip"
- "My Rising Star"
- "Take 5"

Releases on Venture Records:

=== Singles ===
- 2026: "HEY! MR BROWN" / "To Ponder On Sonder" (Streaming)

=== Music videos ===
- "HEY! MR BROWN"
