= Soccer Night =

- Developed by: Granada Television
- Opening theme: "Shall We Take A Trip" by Northside; "Beautiful Day" by U2
- Country of origin: United Kingdom
- Original language: English

Production
- Running time: Varied

Original release
- Network: ITV
- Release: 1990 – 2008

Related
- Midweek Sports Special

Soccer Night is a regional television football programme on ITV in United Kingdom between the 1990s and 2008.

== Early history ==
The programme concept began in 1990 on Granada Television in North West England. Granada Soccer Night, which was shown late on a weekday night, presented by Elton Welsby as a replacement opt-out from the networked Midweek Sports Special.

Granada's head of sport Paul Doherty had been unhappy with the network coverage of Oldham's run to the Littlewoods Cup Final in 1990, and took the initiative to launch their own regional programme. Central Television also chose to launch their own show at the same time.

It showed highlights of midweek football matches, particularly League Cup games. In its earliest years internationals and European club games were also a regular part of the show.

Clive Tyldesley was the lead commentator at launch in 1990, often being sent outside the Granada region to cover matches of North West interest covered by other companies. Alistair Mann was also part of the original team, making his commentary debut in 1991. Rob Palmer, John Helm and Gary Bloom also had spells as the main voice of the programme.

Future series featured Rob McCaffrey, James Cooper and Peter Stevenson as the programme's host.

Featured studio guests included north west players and managers, as well retired professionals and coaches. The show's iconic theme tune was "Shall We Take A Trip" by Manchester band, Northside.

== Soccer Night (2004-2008) ==
By 2004 following multiple mergers and the formation of ITV plc, versions of the original programme were developed for all ITV regions in England and Wales - a late night magazine show, focusing on Football League clubs, was introduced for the 2004–05 season to replace the long-standing Sunday afternoon highlights programmes owing to cutbacks at ITV plc. The theme tune used was "Beautiful Day" by Irish band U2, which was at the time used by ITV as the theme for all their football programming

Region	Presenters
Anglia	Kevin Piper
Tyne Tees (Also shown on Border).	Roger Tames
Central	Stan Collymore; Sarah Jane Mee (2004–08)
Meridian	Andy Steggall
Granada	Matt Smith; Alistair Mann (2004–05)
West	Jed Pitman
Westcountry	Mark Tyler; Jeff Welch
Yorkshire	Andy Townsend; John Shires (stand-in); Peter Beagrie
London (Axed after the 2005–06 season.)	Tony Francis
Wales (Axed in December 2005.)	Sam Lloyd; Jonny Owen (stand-in); David Giles (analyst)

== Regional variations ==
=== Wales Soccer Night/Soccer Sunday ===
Wales Soccer Night (produced by ITV Wales) was axed in December 2005 in response to high viewer demand for the return of a full highlights programme on Sundays as opposed to the magazine-based format on late Thursday nights. Soccer Sunday returned on 15 January 2006 with extended highlights of Cardiff, Swansea and Wrexham matches, presented by Jonny Owen (a local actor and assistant producer at ITV Wales) with match commentary provided by Bob Symonds and Phil Duffell.

The programme was extended to an hour in February 2007 and incorporated goals from all other Football League games. ITV West sports editor Jed Pitman presented the newly expanded programme. The new format was dropped at the end of the 2006/7 season and Soccer Sunday returned to its original format. Pitman left the programme at the end of the year and was replaced by Jonny Owen.

ITV Wales lost the rights to show highlights of Wrexham's matches when the club was relegated to the Blue Square Premier league at the end of the 2007/8 season (a result of Setanta Sports possessing exclusive rights to the Football Conference leagues). In September 2008, BBC Wales gained secondary rights to screen highlights of Wrexham matches for their now-defunct Saturday afternoon results programme, Wales on Saturday.

=== Hancock's Half Time ===
Central Soccer Night and London Soccer Night were replaced in 2006 by Hancock's Half Time, a pan-regional show produced from Central's studios in Birmingham and presented by Nick Hancock & Sarah Jane Mee.

The programme was axed during the 2007/8 season and replaced by a revival of Central Soccer Night in the Midlands. ITV London chose not to produce a replacement programme.

== Demise ==
All Soccer Night programmes in England were axed in May 2008 as part of further cutbacks in ITV's regional output. The Welsh Soccer Sunday continued for a further six months with coverage of Cardiff City and Swansea City for the first half of the 2008/9 season but that programme was axed in December 2008. Goals from local Football League matches are featured in ITV regional news programmes during the 2008–09 season, after which ITV lost the rights to show Football League highlights to the BBC from the start of the 2009/10 season.
