= Stan Boardman =

English stand-up comedian

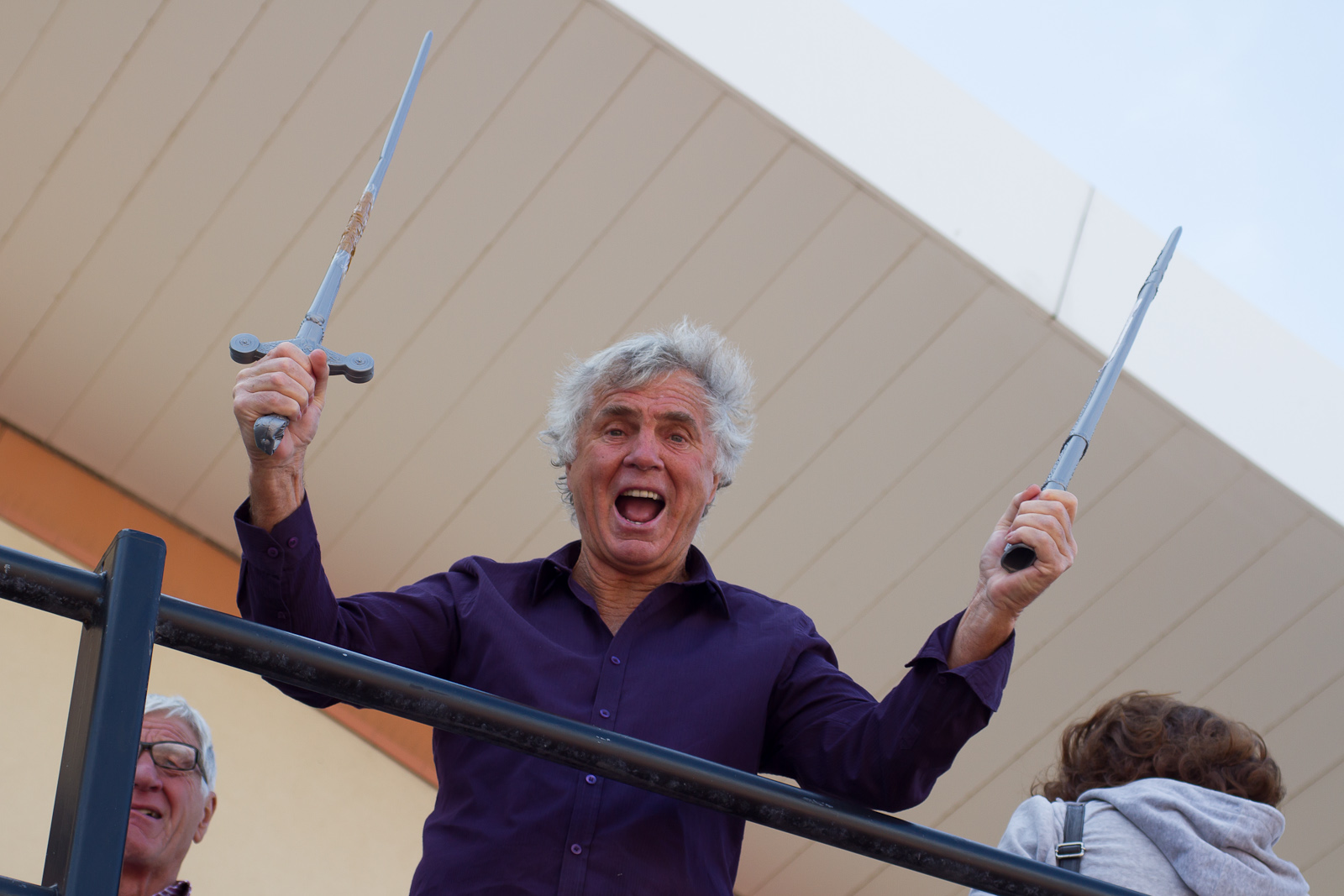
- At the Floral Pavilion Theatre in New Brighton, Merseyside, 2011
- Born: 7 December 1937 (age 88); Liverpool, England
- Notable work: The Comedians
- Spouse: Vivienne (m. 1967)
- Children: Andrea Boardman; Paul Boardman

Comedy career
- Years active: 1970–present
- Medium: comedian

Stanley Boardman (born 7 December 1937) is an English comedian.

== Early life and career ==
Boardman's father was in the army, while he was evacuated with his mother and elder brother to Wrexham during the Second World War, and after the family returned to their Merseyside home mistakenly thinking the area had escaped the German bombs, his brother Tommy, age six, was killed in a 1941 bombing raid which demolished their shelter. Boardman, who was three, survived, but his twelve-year-old baby-sitter was killed. His parents went on to have six daughters, with whom he shared a bedroom.

Boardman, a keen footballer in his youth, was an apprentice at Liverpool F.C. and later signed for Tranmere Rovers as a teenager. Following school he helped run a haulage firm before entering and winning a Butlin's holiday camp talent contest and a grand final held at the London Palladium and a subsequent one-year contract in Bognor Regis where he met his future wife Vivienne. His break into television came with Opportunity Knocks and The Comedians.

Boardman's Stand-up routine was known for his anti-German jokes and his claim that "the Germans bombed our chippy" during the Second World War.

His later involvement in football included being invited by Ron Atkinson to entertain his Sheffield Wednesday and Aston Villa players before their League Cup finals in 1991 and 1994.

== Controversies ==
An incident during a live edition of Des O'Connor Tonight on Thames in November 1986 gained publicity. A joke – about the Second World War reminiscences of a Polish pilot who flew in the Royal Air Force – made play on the word "focke", referring to the German Focke-Wulf aeroplanes.

Boardman's comedic style has led to controversy several times; after telling racist jokes at a Leeds United Player of the Year Award dinner in 2002 (months after two Leeds players had been arrested for assaulting an Asian student), the club withheld his fee, describing his act as "inappropriate and unacceptable", banning him from performing at the club in future. This led to a planned appearance at a Leicester City event being cancelled.

== Other appearances ==
Boardman took part in an episode of Through the Keyhole in 1987, and was also a subject on This Is Your Life in 1995.

Boardman appeared in the 2000 gangster film set in Liverpool, Going Off Big Time.

In June 2006 he had a hit with "Stan's World Cup Song", which reached No. 15 in the UK Singles Chart.

Fellow comedian Peter Kay wrote about him in his second autobiography Saturday Night Peter; in it he describes his early days on the comedy circuit and being on the bill with Boardman who at the time had the nickname Stan "The German Fokker" Boardman.

In June 2009, Boardman appeared on Celebrity Wife Swap, and in October 2011 he appeared with his daughter, Andrea Boardman, on the celebrity version of Coach Trip.

In 2025, his son Paul wrote his fathers' biography, "My Life Story" detailing his fathers' early traumas and his road to success. The book was officially published on the 10th of October, with part of the proceeds going to several charitable causes.
