= University of Lancashire =

University in Lancashire, England

- Coat of arms
- Former names: University of Central Lancashire, UCLan, Harris Art College, Preston Polytechnic, Lancashire Polytechnic
- Motto: Latin: Ex solo ad solem
- Motto in English: "From the Earth to the Sun"
- Type: Public
- Established: 1828 - Institution for the Diffusion of Knowledge; 1992 - granted university status
- Academic affiliations: MillionPlus; Universities UK; Defence Universities Alliance
- Chancellor: Ranvir Singh
- Vice-Chancellor: Graham Baldwin
- Students: 23,865 (2024/25)
- Undergraduates: 17,225 (2024/25)
- Postgraduates: 6,640 (2024/25)
- Location: Preston, Lancashire (Main); Burnley; Cyprus; Westlakes, Cumbria; 53.7630°N 2.7074°W
- Campus: Urban
Colours
- Website: www.lancashire.ac.uk

- Location within Preston city centre

The University of Lancashire is a public university based in the city of Preston, Lancashire, England. It has its roots in The Institution For The Diffusion Of Useful Knowledge, founded in 1828. Previously known as the University of Central Lancashire, Harris Art College, Preston Polytechnic and Lancashire Polytechnic, in 1992 it was granted university status by the Privy Council. The university is the 19th largest in the UK in terms of student numbers.

In December 2024, the university received approval from the Office for Students to change its name to the University of Lancashire, with the rebrand intended to come into effect by September 2025, despite concerns over confusion from the University of Lancaster.

== History ==
The Institution for the Diffusion of Knowledge was founded in 1828 by Joseph Livesey's Temperance Society. The society was born from a pledge made by seven Preston working men (whose names can be seen on a plaque in the university's library) to never again consume alcohol.

The institute was housed in a classical-revivalist building on Cannon Street, before eventually expanding under the endowment of a local lawyer Edmund Robert Harris, who died in 1877. The expansion brought with it several new buildings and houses in the nearby Regent Street were purchased and demolished as a consequence. The institute became a regional centre for the arts and sciences.

As part of Queen Victoria's Diamond Jubilee celebrations in 1897, the institute's trustees paid the Victorian/Edwardian architect Henry Cheers to design the "Victoria Jubilee Technical School" (later known as the Harris Institute and now known as the Harris Building), to be built on Corporation Street. The foundation stone was laid in July 1895. Its goal was to provide local youths with a technical education in all areas. The building was progressive for the period, being powered entirely by electricity.

The institute existed in this state until 1932, when it changed its name to become the Harris Art College. It underwent further expansion and in 1952, and became the Harris College. In 1973, this became Preston Polytechnic, then the Lancashire Polytechnic in 1984. In 1992, full university status was awarded, and the University of Central Lancashire came into existence. The first chancellor of the university was Sir Francis Kennedy, and he was succeeded in 2001 by Sir Richard Evans. In 2016, Ranvir Singh became the new chancellor of the university.

The journalism division, now part of the School of Journalism and Media, is one of the oldest in the country, opening as part of the Harris College in 1962. In 1991, it became one of the first to teach journalism undergraduate degrees, with a strong emphasis on practical work.

In 2012, the University of Lancashire announced a partnership with the BAE Systems, and four other north-western universities (Liverpool, Salford, Lancaster and Manchester) in order to work on the Gamma Programme which aims to develop "autonomous systems". According to the University of Liverpool when referring to the programme, "autonomous systems are technology based solutions that replace humans in tasks that are mundane, dangerous and dirty, or detailed and precise, across sectors, including aerospace, nuclear, automotive and petrochemicals".

In 2013, the School of Dentistry and the School of Postgraduate Medical and Dental Education merged to create the School of Medicine and Dentistry.

The university sponsored the now-defunct Wigan UTC, a university technical college which opened in September 2013.

The university applied for permission to change its name to the University of Lancashire in January 2024. 90% of respondents to the official consultation argued that the name change was confusing, particularly given the existence of Lancaster University. The Office for Students found that the change had "the potential to be confusing for particular groups" but ultimately approved it, citing a need to "protect the institutional autonomy of English higher education providers, and the need to encourage competition".

== Campus ==
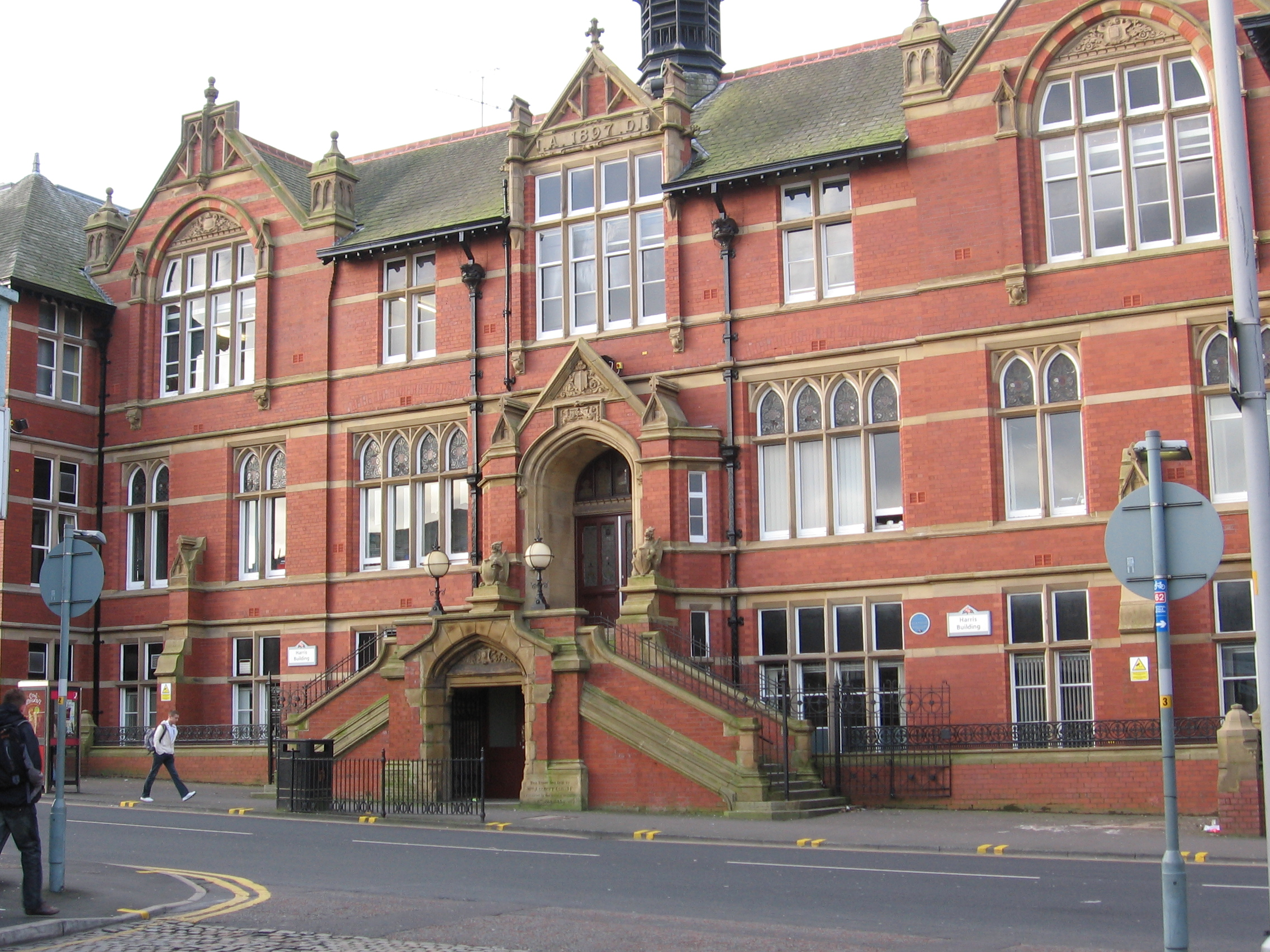
The Harris building

The university is on an urban campus in Preston, with sites in Burnley and in Westlakes, West Cumbria (for Nursing and Medical programmes). A campus in Cyprus opened in October 2012.

=== Preston ===
==== The J B Firth Building ====
In September 2011, the J B Firth Building, named after forensic scientist James Brierly Firth, was opened by the university, at a cost of £12.5m. It houses the School of Forensic and Applied Sciences, which includes subjects such as chemistry and forensic science. The new building has a 4,000 square metres (43,000 ft^{2}) teaching area, which includes six laboratories.

==== Oasis Faith and Spirituality Centre ====
In May 2018, the Oasis Faith and Spirituality Centre opened. The building consists of multiple faith rooms, counselling and event space as well as roof terrace. The multi faith centre replaced the existing one located on St. Peter's Court.

==== Engineering Innovation Centre (EIC) ====
In September 2019, the Engineering Innovation Centre (EIC) opened. It reportedly cost £35 million. The building contains several specialist labs and simulators, as well as teaching and exhibition space.

==== Student Centre and University Square ====
In September 2021, the Student Centre and University Square opened. The Student Centre is a newly built open-plan building on several levels, measuring 7,304 square metres (78,620 ft^{2}). The new University Square is at the front of the Student Centre, and measures 8,440 square metres (90,800 ft^{2}). The combined cost of the two construction projects was reported to be £60 million. The two sites were constructed on land formerly occupied by the Adelphi roundabout, the surrounding road and the Fylde building, (which was demolished in 2015), and on land cleared by the removal of terraced houses on St. Peter's Square (opposite the University Library), and the row of shops on Fylde Road.

=== Cyprus ===
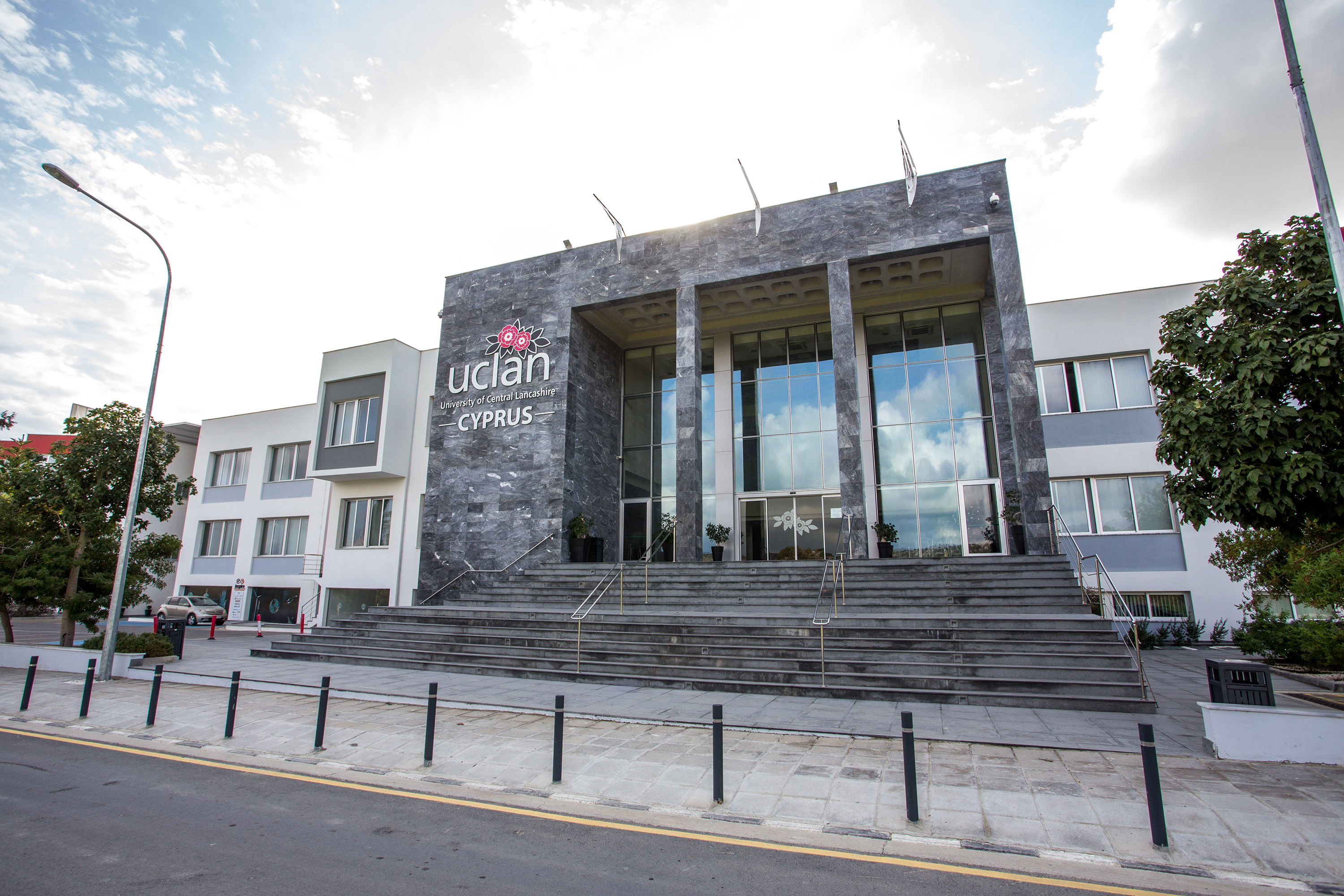
The main building of UCLan Cyprus

The university's Cyprus location is a branch campus of the University of Lancashire situated in Pyla, Larnaka. The campus opened in 2012 and is licensed and registered as a university in Cyprus. It is the only British private university in Cyprus. It accepts international students.

The campus is the first in Cyprus that has a Moot Court for use by the School of Law students.

== Academic profile ==
The university has students and researchers from over 100 countries and partnerships with 125 international institutions. The university has 98 professors, over 600 research or knowledge transfer-active members of staff, and 763 research students. There are 246 Honorary Fellows of the university.

The university has the following schools:

- Centre for Collaborative Learning
- Arts and Media
- Business
- Engineering and Computing
- Health, Social Work and Sport
- Law and Policing
- Nursing and Midwifery
- Pharmacy and Biomedical Sciences
- Psychology and Humanities
- Veterinary Medicine

The University of Lancashire is the only university in the UK to run a feature film module. Results of this course include The Collaborators (2015), Audax (2014), The Wedding (2013), Wraith (2012), Blue December (2011) and Needle In The Hay (2011).

Rankings
National rankings
- Complete (2027): 90
- Guardian (2026): 98
- Times / Sunday Times (2026): 93

Global rankings
- ARWU (2026): 901–1000
- QS (2027): 1001–1200
- THE (2026): 1001–1200

=== Rankings ===
The University of Lancashire is in the top 7% of universities worldwide according to The Center for World University Rankings 2024 (CWUR). The University of Lancashire is in the top 800 universities globally according to the Times Higher Education World University Rankings.

=== International developments ===
In 2012 the university opened University of Lancashire Cyprus a €53 million branch campus in Larnaka, Cyprus. It is the only private British university in Cyprus.

University of Lancashire Cyprus offers bachelor's degrees in business administration, advertising and marketing communications, accounting and finance, hospitality and tourism management, computing, mathematics, English language studies, law, web design and development, sport and exercise science and psychology. It offers master's degrees in business administration, business management, marketing management, education leadership, teaching English to speakers of other languages (TESOL) with applied linguistics, financial and commercial law, computing, cybersecurity, data analytics, sport & exercise science and forensic psychology.

== Student life ==
=== Students' Union ===
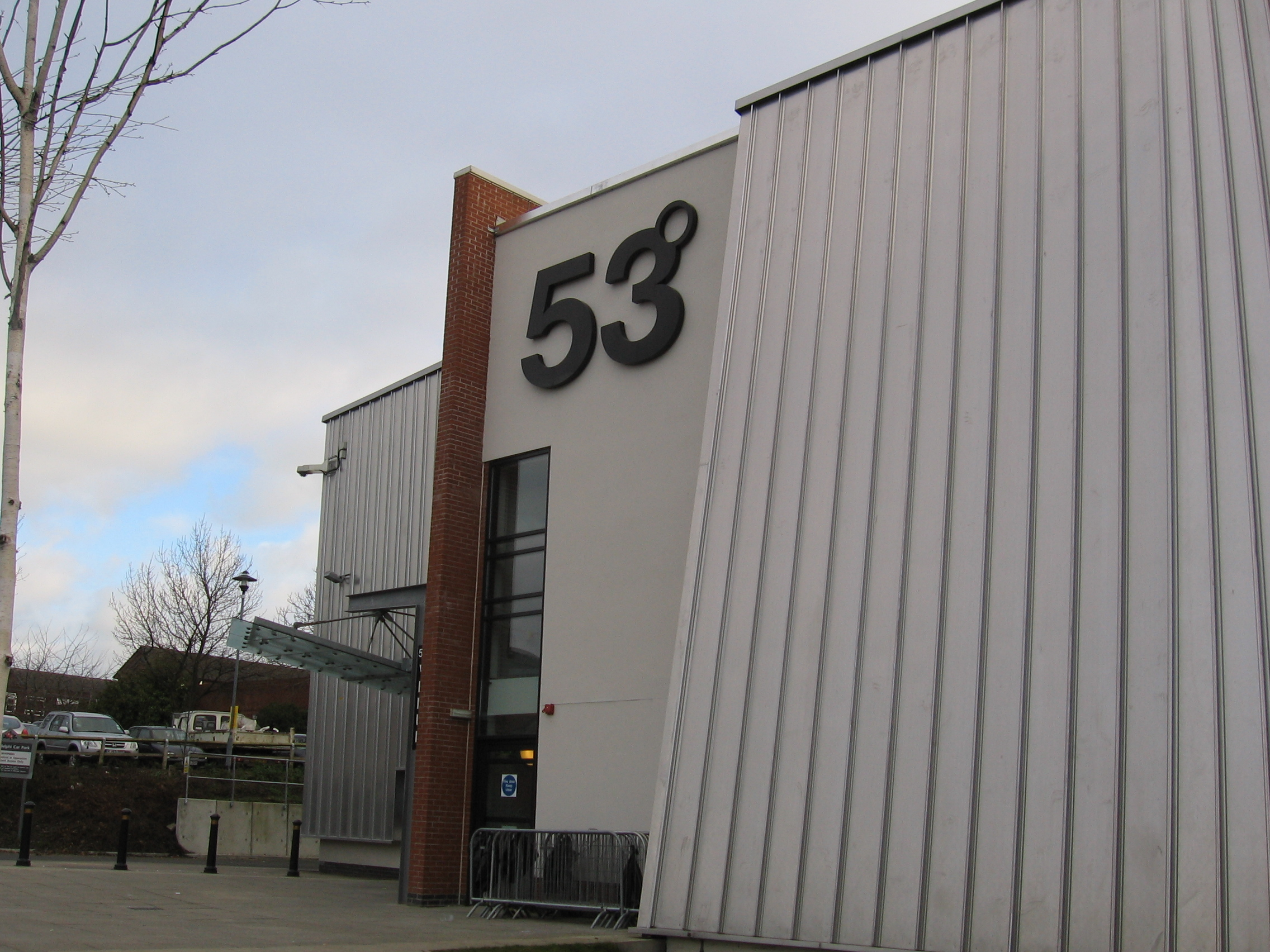
The Students' Union venue, 53 Degrees.

The nightclub and live music venue at the Students' Union, '53 Degrees', has two floors with a bar on each and occasionally hosts musical performers. Across two rooms, total capacities are 1,100 & 350 for club nights and 1,400 and 350 for all live gigs. The adjoining bar, 'Lampworks', is open seven days a week during term times. '53 Degrees' is no longer owned by the Students' Union however Freshers' Week events are still run in the venue.

=== Sports ===
There are over 35 sports clubs run by the university, under the name Team Lancashire. Many have block bookings at the Sir Tom Finney Sports Centre and Sports Arena in term-time for training and matches. The sports clubs participate in British Universities and Colleges Sport competitions and have home and away fixtures.

The university outdoor sport facilities can be found at Sports Arena (USA) which is located two miles away and was opened in 2000 by The Princess Royal. The £12 million arena provides facilities for rugby league, rugby union, football (five grass pitches), hockey (two floodlit all-weather pitches), netball, tennis (four floodlit courts), and cycling (1 mile (1.6 km) circuit), as well as an eight-lane athletics area, equipped for school, club, and county competitions.

Students from the university's Motor Sports Engineering and Operations course run a motor racing team, Team Lancashire Motorsports.

=== Media ===
The Pulse was a student media brand at the Union. It consisted of a student newspaper which printed six times a year, and began in 1985 as the Ribble Echo; Pulse Radio, founded in 1999 as Frequency Radio; and a TV station. The Pulse stopped broadcasting in 2020 due to the COVID-19 pandemic, however efforts were taken in 2024 to relaunch the organisation.

== Notable people ==
=== Alumni ===
- Estelle Asmodelle, Australian model and activist
- Ekin-Su Cülcüloğlu, Turkish actress, singer, model and television personality
- Waqar Azmi, EU Ambassador and former Chief Diversity Adviser to the Prime Minister, Cabinet Office
- Jim Bamber, illustrator for Autosport (Preston College of Art)
- Polly Billington, journalist and special adviser to Ed Miliband
- Isioma Daniel, journalist
- Victoria Derbyshire, broadcaster on BBC Radio 5 Live
- Reni Eddo-Lodge, journalist and author of Why I'm No Longer Talking to White People About Race
- Mary Fitzpatrick, visual artist Liverpool Art Prize
- Andy Goldsworthy, visual artist
- Gemma Hallett, international rugby player and entrepreneur
- Hisham Hanifah, Bruneian government minister
- Nina Hossain, ITV News broadcaster
- Simon Kelner, former editor of The Independent
- Sarah Ann Kennedy, British voice actress
- Carl Lygo, Vice-Chancellor, BPP University
- Lee Mavers, founding member of Liverpool band The La's
- Adam McClean, BBC Breakfast and BBC News journalist
- Paul Nuttall, UKIP MEP
- Ian Payne, Sky sports broadcaster
- Craig Pickering, Team GB Olympic 100m sprinter
- Brent Sadler, CNN correspondent
- Andrew Shie, assistant Bishop of the Anglican Diocese of Kuching (Sarawak and Brunei Darussalam), first Anglican Bishop from Brunei
- Ranvir Singh, BBC Radio Five Live and television presenter
- Donald Stokes, industrialist and life peer
- Mike Sutton, originator of the Market Reduction Approach
- Bryan Talbot, award-winning comic book artist and writer
- Mark Tattersall, television presenter Granada Reports
- Don Warrington, actor
- William Watt, 2010 Digital Journalist of the Year
- Kerry Wilkinson, UK number one bestselling author
- Angela Wakefield, British fine artist

=== Academics ===
- Susan Bailey, Professor of Child Mental Health since 2004
- Warwick Fox, emeritus Professor of Philosophy
- Duncan Glen, former lecturer in graphic design
- Stanley Henig, former head of the Department of Politics and European Studies
- Lubaina Himid, Professor of Contemporary Art, 2017 Turner Prize winner
- Christine King, former head of the School of Historical and Critical Studies and Dean of the Faculty of Arts
- Ewa Mazierska, Professor in Contemporary Cinema since 2008
- Ewan McKendrick, former lecturer in law
- David Phoenix, Deputy Vice-Chancellor from 2008 to 2013
- Rex Pope, former head of the School of Historical and Critical Studies
- Michael Thomas, Professor of Higher Education and Online Learning
- John K. Walton, former professor of social history
- Laurence Williams, Professor of Nuclear Safety and Regulation from 2010 to 2014

== See also ==
- Armorial of British universities
- List of universities in the United Kingdom
- Post-1992 university
