= Collaboration (disambiguation) =

Collaboration is a process where two or more people or organizations work together to realise shared goals.

Collaboration(s) may also refer to:

== Music ==
- The Collaboration (music group), a dance music project, 1999–2001
- Collaboration (Shorty Rogers and André Previn album), 1955
- Collaboration (Modern Jazz Quartet and Laurindo Almeida album), 1964
- Collaboration, an album by Shawn Phillips, 1971
- Collaboration (George Benson and Earl Klugh album), 1987
- Collaboration (Helen Merrill and Gil Evans album), 1987
- Collaboration (Tommy Emmanuel album), 1998
- Collaborations (KJ-52 album), a 2002 album by KJ-52
- Collaborations (Space Tribe album), 2004
- Collaborations (Sinéad O'Connor album), a 2005 album by Sinéad O'Connor
- Collaborations (Jill Scott album), a 2007 album by Jill Scott
- Collaborations (Marilyn Crispell album), 2009
- Collaborations 2, by Punjabi singer Sukshinder Shinda, 2009
- Collaborations (Ravi Shankar and George Harrison album), 2010
- Collaborations (Bruno Mars album), 2026

== Publications ==
- The Collaboration: Hollywood's Pact with Hitler, a non-fiction book
- Collaboration: Japanese Agents and Local Elites in Wartime China, a non-fiction book
- Collaboration (magazine), a magazine dedicated to the spiritual and evolutionary vision of Sri Aurobindo and The Mother

== Other uses ==
- The Collaboration (TV program), a 2016 Chinese and South Korean collaboration television program
- The Collaboration (play), 2022 dramatic stage play by Anthony McCarten
- Collaboration (What We Do in the Shadows), an episode of the TV series What We Do in the Shadows
- Working with an enemy occupier against one's own country, known as collaborationism, including (during World War II)
  - Collaboration with Nazi Germany and Fascist Italy
  - Collaboration with the Empire of Japan
