= Alistair Mann =

- Born: Alistair Howard Mann; 1974 (age 51–52); Salford, Lancashire, England
- Education: University of Central Lancashire
- Occupation: Football commentator

Alistair Mann is a freelance football commentator and TV sports presenter.

He was born in Salford and attended Manchester Grammar School. He trained as a journalist at the department of Journalism, Media and Communication, University of Central Lancashire.

Mann worked for ITV Granada, where he presented all their sports output including Soccer Night and the daily news magazine show Granada Reports. He began his career with Manchester-based Piccadilly Radio.

In 2006, he began commentating on the BBC's Match of the Day. He formed part of the BBC's Olympic coverage: 2008 Beijing, 2012 London and 2016 Rio, including the men's gold medal match, won by Brazil against Germany on penalties. He also commentated for the BBC on the men's football tournament at the Tokyo Olympics in 2021 and then the Men's Olympic Football in Paris 2024, once more including the final, won by Spain against France.

Since 2013, he has been a commentator on the TNT Sports channel covering UEFA Champions League, UEFA Europa League, French, German, Italian and MLS football. He's also on UEFA's coverage of international matches and has featured regularly on Sky Sports' coverage of those games.

Since 2024, he has been one of Sky Sports' Football League commentators, working extensively on the SkyBet Championship and Carabao Cup coverage, as well as League One and League Two. He's also a regular on Manchester City's coverage.

Mann has won three National Royal Television Society awards and been nominated twice more. He is a winner of the BT Journalist of the Year award.
