= Sky Campus =

TV studio and office complex in England

- Location within Greater London
- Alternative names: Osterley TVC; Sky Centre; Sky News Centre

General information
- Status: Operational
- Type: Offices and television studios
- Location: Grant Way, Isleworth, England
- Coordinates: 51.487°N 0.327°W
- Current tenants: Sky News; Sky Sports
- Construction started: 1989
- Client: Sky
- Owner: Sky Group (Comcast)

Design and construction
- Architecture firm: Arup (Sky Studios)
- Quantity surveyor: Gleeds / Davis Langdon (Sky Studios)
- Main contractor: Bovis (Sky Studios)

Sky Studios (also known as Sky Campus) is the headquarters of satellite broadcaster Sky, and home to much of its programming output. The Isleworth campus consists of nine buildings plus ancillary structures, with three of those buildings containing television studios. The site is also a playout centre for many of Sky's channels.

There are ten conventional television studios on site, alongside a number of galleries, purpose-built studios for news and sports news broadcasting, and post-production facilities. A number of the studios are available for independent production companies to hire.

Sky Sports, Sky Sports News and Sky News all use the studios. Previously it has been the home of light entertainment shows such as Thronecast, Skavlan, Harry Hill's Tea Time and Brainiac: Science Abuse.

== Studio facilities ==
The studios at Osterley are currently located across three main buildings.

=== Sky Studios / Harlequin 1 ===
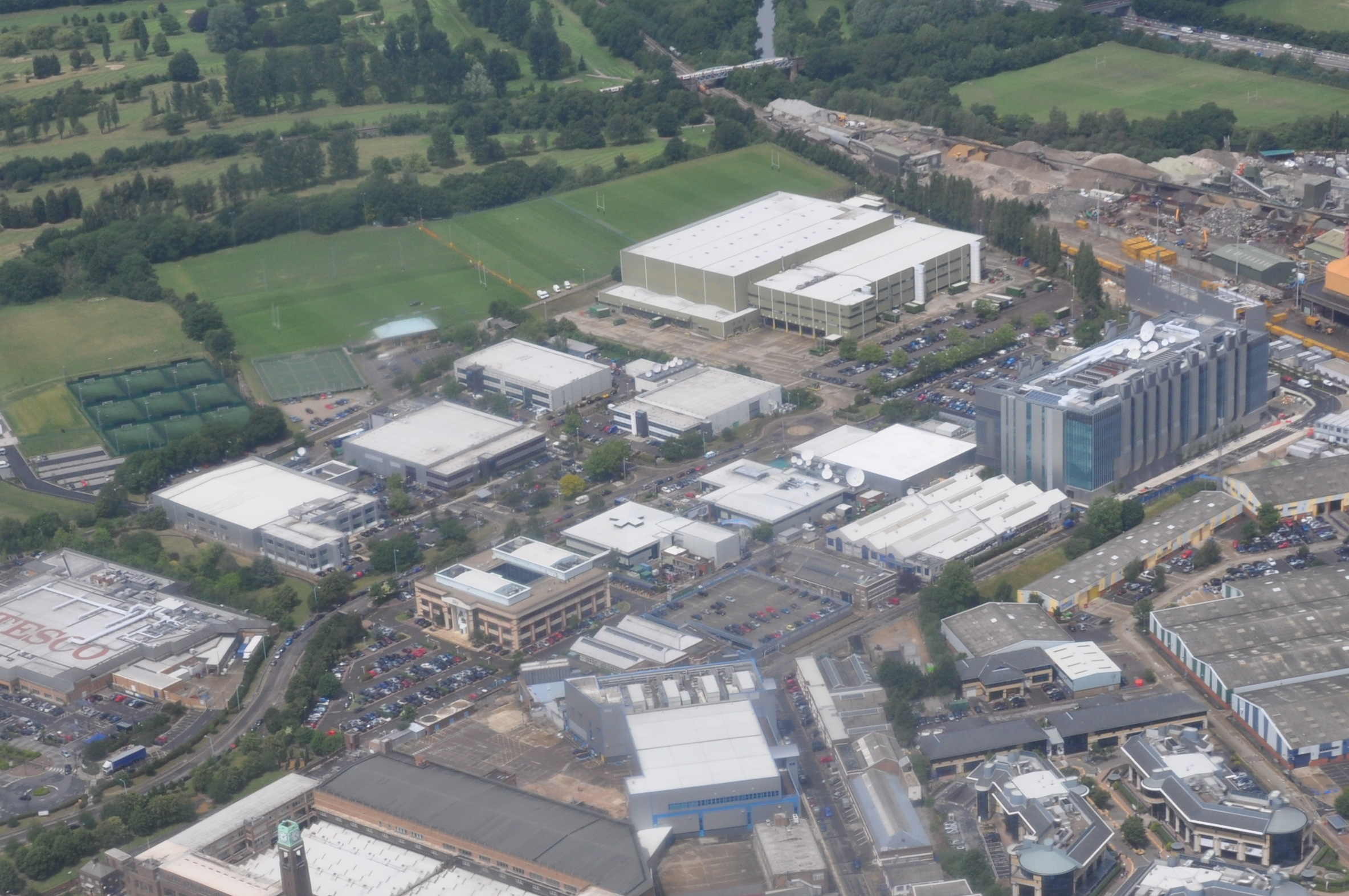
Aerial view of Sky's campus in 2011, with only Sky Studios complete

Originally called Harlequin 1, the Sky Studios building contains eight conventional studios located on the ground floor.

- Studio 1 (50 ft x 36 ft approx) – a mixed use sports studio, used for programmes such as Monday Night Football
- Studio 2 (36 ft x 30 ft approx) – golf studio
- Studio 3 (36 ft x 25 ft approx) – a mixed use sports studio
- Studio 4 (20.6 m x 14.1 m) – a 3,126.5 sq ft (290.46 m^{2}) multi-purpose studio
- Studio 5 (15.6 m x 14.1 m) – a 2,367.6 sq ft (219.96 m^{2}) multi-purpose studio
- Studio 6 (45 ft x 30 ft approx) – Sky News studio (including chromakey), previously used for Sunrise
- Studio 7 (35 ft x 30 ft approx) – used for Soccer Saturday
- Studio 8 (10.6 m x 9.9 m) – a 1,129.6 sq ft (104.94 m^{2}) multi-purpose studio used for programmes including Sky News' FYI children's news programme and Saturday Social

Studios 4 and 5 can be used together or separately thanks to a soundproof double door – combined, they are 122 ft long and 5,676.3 sq ft (527.35 m^{2}). Due to the door runners, camera pedestals cannot be tracked over the studio join. Shows such as Thronecast, Skavlan and Harry Hill's Tea Time have been made in these studios.

Studios 6, 7 and 8 have dock doors which open directly onto an access road, whilst studio 5 has a dock door with a short access tunnel before another door opening out onto an access road. Studios 1, 2, 3 and 4 have scene dock doors which open out onto a scene dock.

There are also a number of non-conventional studios located elsewhere in the building.

- Sky Sports News Newsroom on the 1st floor
- Sportsline and Sky News sports bulletin studio - part of the Sky Sports News Newsroom
- Studio 22 – Sky News weather studio on the 2nd floor

There are six production galleries on the ground floor alongside the conventional studios, with separate sound control rooms alongside each gallery. Any studio can be controlled from any gallery. Gallery 1 has been turned into a gallery which is capable of remote production for the EFL Championship. There is also a routing, distribution and instant replay hub in Studio 2's former control room, and Studio 7's control room is split into commentary booths and associated technical equipment. Sky Sports News is broadcast from Gallery 6. Sky News have two gallery facilities, PCR 21 and PCR 22, located on the second floor alongside Studio 22, which are used to control Studio 6, Studio 21, Studio 22, Millbank and the two City Studios. There are also a number of separate production galleries for remote sports production located elsewhere in the building.

=== Sky 2 ===
Sky 2 is currently home of Sky Creative Agency and contains two television studios: one automated and one conventional.

- Studio F (18.5 m x 15 m, formerly Studio 6) – a 3,004.9 sq ft (279.16 m^{2}) multi-purpose studio used for shows including Soccer AM and The Pledge
- Studio G (50 ft x 40 ft approx, formerly Studio 7) – dedicated Sky Sports Racing studio

Both studios share a covered scene dock but have separate production galleries. Studio F's gallery is located on the second floor, with access via a gantry from the studio floor, whilst Studio G's gallery is located on the same level as the studio. The Soccer AM (and previously, Game Changers) exterior set is located next to these studios. Studio F hosted the 'Battle for Number 10' Conservative leadership programme in August 2022, with audience of around 60 people.

=== Sky Central ===
Sky Central is the largest building on site, and is home to a significant proportion of Sky's staff. It was completed in 2016. There is one studio in this building, located on the first floor.

- Studio 21 – Sky News main daytime and evening studio, colloquially known as 'The Glass Box'

This studio is currently controlled from PCR 21 on the second floor of the Sky Studios building.

In addition, the atrium and mezzanine of Sky Central was used for Sky News' coverage of the 2019 United Kingdom general election.

== Former studio facilities ==
There are a number of buildings previously containing television studios which have now been vacated.

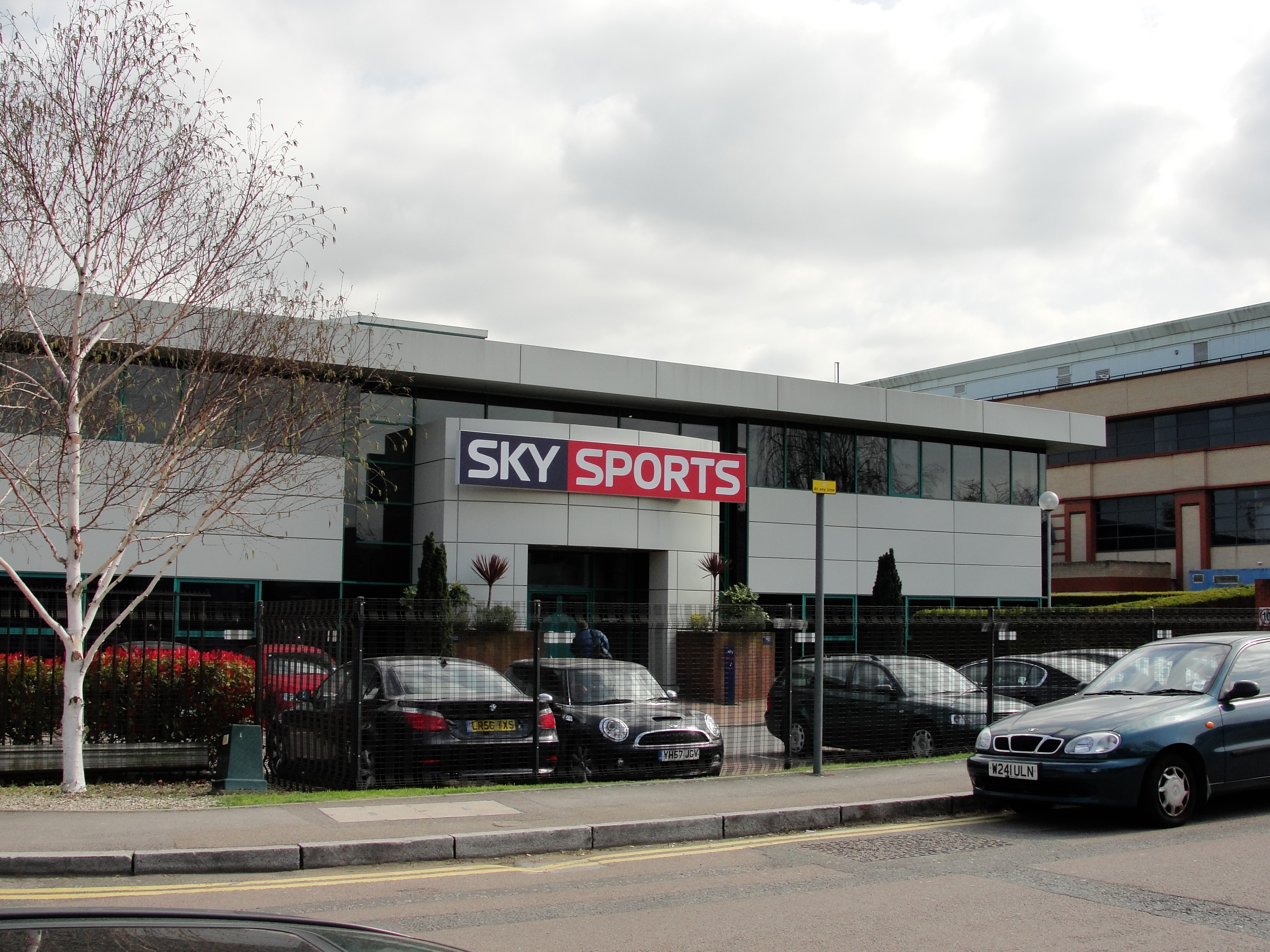
Sky 7, demolished in October 2019

=== Sky News Centre / Sky 1 ===
Built in 2004 and vacated in early 2018, with studio facilities moving to Sky Central and the Sky Studios building. Staff who previously occupied the Sky News Centre moved to a dedicated floor of the Sky Studios building.

- Studio A (8,000 square feet approx) – former main Sky News newsroom, and previously the main presentation studio
- Studio B (40 ft x 30 ft approx) – previously a virtual reality studio
- Studio C (1,000 square feet approx) – formerly home of 5 News from 2005 to 2012
- Studio D – a small interview/presentation studio

The main Sky News gallery was, until January 2018, located behind Studio A and could regularly be seen in the background of shots, alongside Sky News' Network operations center.

Parts of the building have now been modified for use as a scenery workshop.

=== 1989 warehouse ===
The original five studios on the site have all been demolished as of October 2019.

- Studio 1 – original Sky Sports News studio with attached newsroom. Closed in 2011.
- Studio 2 (30 ft x 20 ft approx) – original Sky News studio, with the newsroom visible through a window at the back of the set. Closed in 2011.
- Studio 3 (35 ft x 20 ft approx) – generic / interchangeable sports presentation studio. Closed in 2011.
- Studio H (60 ft x 30 ft approx, formerly Studio 4) – the previous home of Soccer AM, and also the home of Sky One's entertainment series Braniac: Science Abuse from 2006 onwards. When Harlequin 1 opened it was renamed 'Studio H', and closed in 2012, and was then used as a scenery workshop until mid 2019.
- Studio 5 (30 ft x 20 ft approx) – generic / interchangeable sports presentation studio. Closed in 2011.

As of October 2019, Studio H (which became part of building Sky 7) has been demolished for the construction of the new Innovation Centre, which also involved the demolition of the adjacent building, Sky 6.

== Productions ==
Some productions have been broadcast from different studios, so the studios listed are the most recently used.

=== Sky Sports productions ===
- Cricket AM (2006–2013)
- Fantasy Football Club (2013–2017)
- GameChangers (Studio 4&5, 2013–present)
- Goals on Sunday (Studio 1, 1995–present)
- The Hundred Draft (Studio 4&5, 2019)
- Monday Night Football (Studio 1, 1992–2007, 2010–present)
- NFL on Sky Sports (Studio 1, 1992–present)
- Soccer AM (Studio F, 1995–2023)
- Soccer Saturday (Studio 7, 1992–present)
- Sky Sports News (SSN Newsroom, 1998–present)
- Sky Sports Racing (Studio G, 2019–present)
- Sunday Supplement (Studio F, 1999–present)

=== Sky News productions ===
- Cameron & Miliband: The Battle For Number 10 (Studio 4&5, 2015)
- Corbyn v Smith: The Battle for Labour (Studio 4&5, 2016)
- Jeremy Hunt: The Battle for Number 10 (Studio 21, 2019)
- May v Corbyn: The Battle For Number 10 (Studio 4&5, 2017)
- The Pledge (Studio F, 2016–present)
- Sophy Ridge on Sunday (Studio 21, 2017–present)
- Sportsline (Bulletin Studio, 2012–present)
- Sunrise (Studio 6, 1989–2019)

=== Sky productions ===
- Alan Carr's Binge Watch (Studio 4&5, 2018 non-TX pilot)
- Brainiac: Science Abuse (Studio H, 2006–2008)
- The Chris Ramsey Show (Studio 4&5, 2017–2018)
- Comedians Watching Football With Friends (Studio 4/5, 2019)
- Cleverdicks (2012)
- The Devil's Dinner Party (2011)
- Thronecast (Studio 4&5, 2012–2019)
- Harry Hill's Tea Time (Studio 4&5, 2017–2018)
- Playhouse: Live (Studio F, 2010)
- Romesh's Look Back to the Future (Studio 4&5, 2018)
- The Russell Howard Hour (Studio 4&5, 2016 non-TX pilot)
- Sky Arts Sessions (Studio F / Studio 4&5, 2014–2015)
- West:Word (Studio F, 2018)

=== Other productions ===
- Football League Tonight (Studio F, 2015–2018)
- Football on 5 (Studio F, 2015–2018)
- Live from Studio Five (2009–2011)
- RI:SE (2002)
- Skavlan (Studio 4&5, 2017–present)
- 5 News (Studio C, 2005–2012)
