= Paul Boardman =

English footballer and sports broadcaster

Paul Stanley Boardman (born 6 November 1967) is an English former professional footballer and sports broadcaster who worked for Sky Sports News.

== Football career ==
After graduating with a Bachelor of Science in Kinesiology from the University of Maryland, Boardman signed a professional contract with Plymouth Argyle, scoring on his league debut against Bournemouth. His career came to an end after two and a half years following an injury, having made only three league appearances.

== Later career ==
After eight years spent doing stand-up on the comedy circuit, Boardman moved into television, presenting a show on satellite TV channel Men and Motors called Boobs. He joined Sky Sports News as a presenter in June 2001, and also hosted the football phone-in show You're On Sky Sports. He later hosted Sky Sports' football-highlight show Football First.

== Personal life ==
Boardman is the son of Vivienne Boardman and comedian Stan Boardman and is twin brother of television presenter Andrea Boardman. In 2025, he collaborated, to write father Stan's biography, "My Life Story" to be published on the 10 October. The book details early World War II traumas as a child and Stan's subsequent road to Showbiz success.

Boardman supports Everton F.C.
