= Andrea Boardman =

English television presenter

- Born: Andrea Vivienne Boardman; 6 November 1967 (age 58); Enfield, Middlesex, England
- Occupation: Television presenter

Andrea Vivienne Boardman (born 6 November 1967) is an English television presenter.

== History ==
Boardman was born and raised in Enfield, Middlesex.

In 1985, Boardman represented England in the Miss International 1985 pageant, held in Japan, where she reached the semi-finals.

Boardman began presenting when ITV's Disney Club launched in the UK in 1988. She was given the role of female presenter after 2,000 hopefuls applied for the job. She went on to present Disney Adventures (ITV), Future Cooks (BBC1), Entertainment Express (BBC1), Live & Kicking (BBC1), Prize Time (Challenge TV), Entertainment Today (Talk TV) as well as producing/presenting her weekend breakfast show on Liberty Radio. Boardman was a regular face on TV shows including National Lottery, You Bet, Comic Relief, Children in Need, Don't Try this at Home and many more.

After a six-year break from TV to bring up her family, Boardman has recently appeared on Ready Steady Cook and Daybreak. In October 2011, along with her father Stan she appeared on Coach Trip.

== Personal life ==
Boardman is married with two children and is the daughter of mother Vivienne and Liverpudlian comedian Stan Boardman and she is twin sister to Sky Sports presenter and comedian Paul Boardman, who was also born on 6 November 1967.
