= Clare Tomlinson =

British television presenter

Clare Louise Tomlinson is an English television presenter, formerly for British satellite broadcast sports network Sky Sports. She was born in Barrowby, Lincolnshire.

== Education ==
Tomlinson attended the Kesteven and Grantham Girls' School. She studied history at the University of Leeds.

== Career ==
Tomlinson started her career in public relations, including a period as the receptionist for Max Clifford & Associates. In the early 1990s, Tomlinson worked at the Football Association as a media officer.

Later in the decade she was appointed as the head of the communications department at Arsenal, where she helped the new manager Arsène Wenger with media relations.

Tomlinson joined BSkyB's UEFA Champions League coverage alongside Richard Keys. She then became touchline reporter on Sky Sports' Ford Super Sunday, and co-presented Goals On Sunday, Sky Sports' Sunday morning football highlights programme.

Tomlinson was placed on leave from Goals on Sunday for two months, from October 2007.

Tomlinson is a former presenter on Sky Sports News. She usually presented on the late show Through the Night. In April 2007, she became the first woman to present the Professional Footballers' Association Awards Ceremony at the Grosvenor Hotel in London.
