= Soccer Saturday =

Football television programme, broadcast on Sky Sports

- Also known as: Sports Saturday (1992–1998)
- Presented by: Simon Thomas (2023–present); Jeff Stelling (1994–2023); Paul Dempsey (1992–1994); Sue Barker (1992–1994)
- Starring: Paul Merson; Alan McInally; Michael Dawson; Tim Sherwood; Sue Smith; Clinton Morrison; Matt Murray; Lee Hendrie; Kris Boyd; Jamie Mackie; Jobi McAnuff; Mike Dean
- Opening theme: Gillette Soccer Saturday theme
- Country of origin: United Kingdom
- Original language: English

Production
- Production locations: Studio 7 (Sky Studios), Osterley, London
- Camera setup: Multi-camera
- Running time: 330–360 minutes

Original release
- Network: Sky Sports (1992-1998); Sky Sports News (1998–); Sky Sports Main Event (2017–); Sky Sports Premier League (2017–); Sky Sports Football (2017–)
- Release: 1992 – present

Soccer Saturday is a British football-focused programme broadcast on Sky Sports. It delivers live score updates and commentary on football matches across various leagues, particularly the Premier League and English Football League, on Saturday afternoons. First aired in 1998, it has become a staple for football fans in the United Kingdom who want real-time updates during the 3pm "blackout", during which time English and Scottish football games cannot be shown on television.

Originally hosted by Jeff Stelling, the show gained a loyal following due to his charismatic presenting style. Stelling stepped down at the end of the 2022–23 season, with Simon Thomas taking over hosting duties for the 2023–24 season. The show features a rotating panel of pundits, including former footballers like Paul Merson, Clinton Morrison and Sue Smith. Each of these experts provides analysis on matches and incidents as they happen.

The programme airs on Sky Sports News, typically from 12 noon to 6 p.m., and includes updates from reporters at various football grounds around the country.

== History ==
Soccer Saturday grew out of Sports Saturday, which started in August 1992 and was hosted by Paul Dempsey and Sue Barker. Sports Saturday was similar in format to the BBC's Grandstand programme featuring a variety of sports and as with Grandstand, the programme finished with news of the day's football in a segment called Scorelines. Jeff Stelling joined the programme in 1994 and became its sole presenter a year later.

From the start of the 1998/99 season, it became a football-only programme and accordingly the name of the programme changed to Soccer Saturday.

Prior to May 2010, portions of the programme were simulcast on Sky Sports 1 as well as Sky Sports News. The portions simulcast were between 12:00 and 12:30, and 15:00 and 17:15, although this differed depending on the matches being covered on Sky Sports 1. From the start of the 2010–11 season these simulcasts were dropped and for the next three seasons the programme was exclusive to Sky Sports News. The Sky Sports 1 simulcast returned for the 2013–14 season as part of Sky Sports 1's new all-day Saturday football service. For the 2014–15 season the programme moved from Sky Sports 1 to Sky Sports 5 but reverted to Sky Sports 1 for the 2016–17 season.

Following the relaunching of Sky Sports as sports-themed channels in 2017, the programme is shown on Sky Sports Premier League and Sky Sports Football. It is also see on Sky Sports Main Event and Sky Sports, if neither channel is showing live sport, and only during the times when live sport is not being shown. The 'live scores' section of the Saturday edition (3pm to 5pm) is also shown on Sky One.

== Format ==
Soccer Saturday is broadcast from 12:00 on Sky Sports News and usually airs for six hours. The programme begins with the host and six regular in-studio pundits previewing the weekend's matches, reviewing recent results and debating current issues in football. During Jeff Stelling's tenure as presenter the show was also famous for the rapport between himself and the pundits. There was much banter between the pundits and Stelling, who, in a good humoured manner, often pointed out the other's mistakes and incorrect predictions. Stelling exuberantly celebrated goals scored by his favourite team (Hartlepool United). Viewers are kept updated on the progress of early kick-offs by reporters at the games and by graphics below and to the right of the director's cut. These graphics also includes latest team news and league standings.

From 15:00 to 17:15, Soccer Saturday provides running coverage of the 3 pm league matches, of which none is televised in the UK and one is televised in Rest Of World. The graphics display a vidiprinter and cycle through current scores in the English and Scottish leagues, with Simon Thomas providing commentary on the events as they unfold. Significant events at the most high-profile games – almost always in the Premier League – are described by the studio panel who each watch a game on a monitor. Other games deemed important are reported on by correspondents at the grounds connected to the studio by a video link, ISDN or telephone. Where a video link is used, it shows the reporter facing the pitch so that the stand is in the background, in line with the FA blackout which prohibits broadcasting live football during those hours. This portion of the show is also aired on Sky Showcase.

After the 3 pm games finish, the classified football results appear which, for around 30 years, were read by Alan Lambourn. This task is now carried out by the programme's presenter. This is followed by a run-through of the updated league tables. A commercial break then follows and this is when the vidiprinter is removed from the screen. For the final 45 minutes of the programme the studio pundits discuss the games they have been watching, and post-match interviews with players and managers are shown.

The regular format occasionally changes, for example during international windows when no Premier League or Championship matches are played, the show is shortened to 14:00 and 17:30, and League 1 and 2 fixtures are then covered by the studio pundits as opposed to the usual Premier League ones. Julian Warren presents Soccer Saturday during the international break.

=== Soccer Special ===
A programme with the same format is also broadcast when there are a number of midweek games, such as on UEFA Champions League nights, in which case it is known as Soccer Special. Since 2011, Soccer Special has been hosted by Julian Warren. Between 2008 and 2011, Ed Chamberlin presented the programme. He had previously shared presenting the programme with Ian Payne during the previous season. Soccer Special was hosted by Stelling until he began presenting Monday Night Football at the start of the 2005–06 season. The midweek Soccer Specials are often simulcast on Sky Sports 1. From the 2015–2016 season, Stelling started presenting Soccer Special again as Sky lost the rights to Champions League coverage to BT Sport.

The Soccer Special name is also used when a full afternoon programme of football is played on a day other than Saturday, which usually only occurs on Boxing Day, New Year's Day (unless that falls on either Friday or Sunday) and Easter Monday as well as the last day of the Championship and the last day of the Premier League season as both are normally played on a Sunday. On these occasions the programme was usually presented by Stelling and followed the normal Soccer Saturday format. One notable difference is that unlike the normal Soccer Saturday broadcasts, the goals that are being scored can be shown live on television as there is no blackout on those days.

=== Sports Saturday/Sunday ===
For a few years during the summer, the show was replaced with Sports Saturday, which is more akin to the show's original format, concentrating on sports other than football due to the absence of competitive football during the summer. This again was presented by Ed Chamberlin. The programme did not return in 2009 or 2010, but was revived in July 2011, although it was presented by regular Sky Sports News presenters.

However, in August 2010, Sky announced the launch of Sports Sunday. This programme, which aired Sundays from 13:00–18:00, was similar to the old Sports Saturday format, was initially presented by Ed Chamberlain but after his promotion in early 2011 to additional football presenting duties on Sky Sports, the programme started to be presented by other presenters from the Sky Sports News roster.

From 2021, Sports Sunday began to show the vidiprinter on screen throughout the programme, which by now was on air from 12:00–18:00, on which the latest British and European scores are displayed. The scores shown also include the Women's Super League and the Women's Championship. However, this was cut back to 14:00–18:00 following the shortening of the Sunday afternoon programme, which was renamed as Soccer Sunday.

== Presenters and reporters ==
- Presenter: Simon Thomas
- Relief/Soccer Special Presenter: Julian Warren, who presents the programme during international breaks, David Prutton (presented show on 03/10/2026 during international break)
- Lead Studio Pundit: Paul Merson
- Additional Studio Pundits: Michael Dawson, Matt Murray, Jamie Mackie, Lee Hendrie, Clinton Morrison, Kris Boyd, Sue Smith and Mike Dean
- Reporters: David Craig, Guy Havord, Dickie Davis, Rob Palmer, Johnny Phillips, Neil Mellor, Peter Smith, Peter Stevenson, Stuart Jarrold, Simon Watts, Tony Colliver, Jonathan Beales, Rob McCaffrey, Steve Jackson, Mike Jones, Russ Taylor, Mark Benstead, Mark McAdam, Frank Gilfeather, Andy Walker, Stuart Lovell, Davie Donaldson, Dave Bracegirdle, John Temple, Jaydee Dyer, Courtney Sweetman-Kirk, Abigail Davies, Des Hinks, Katie Shanahan, Lynsey Hooper, Aaron Paul, Jessica Creighton and Emma Paton (both presented EFL Goalzone during 24/25 season)
- Former Reporters: John Gwynne, Bob Hall, Chris Kamara
- Former Presenters: Paul Dempsey, Jeff Stelling

Rodney Marsh was a regular pundit, known for his outspoken views, until being sacked by Sky Sports in early 2005 after a joke referencing the 2004 Indian Ocean tsunami. George Best was also a regular until leaving in 2004 to fight alcohol problems. In August 2020, regular studio pundits Matt Le Tissier, Phil Thompson and Charlie Nicholas were controversially sacked from the programme. Other former studio analysts include Frank McLintock, Alan Brazil, Alan Mullery, Clive Allen, and Gordon McQueen.

On 30 October 2021, Stelling announced his intention to leave Soccer Saturday at the end of the 2021–22 season. However, on 28 March 2022, Sky Sports announced that Stelling would be staying until at least the end of the 2022–23 season. He then confirmed on 29 April 2023 that he would be leaving the show and the organisation. Stelling was succeeded by Simon Thomas.

In April 2022, it was announced that Chris Kamara would leave Soccer Saturday at the end of the 2021–22 season after working on the programme for 24 years.

=== Current presenters ===
* Denotes relief presenter

Presenter	Duration
Simon Thomas	2022, 2023–
*Julian Warren	2011–

=== Previous presenters ===
* Denotes relief presenter

Presenter	Duration
*Ed Chamberlin	2008–2011
Paul Dempsey	1992–1994
Sue Barker	1992–1994
Jeff Stelling	1994–2023

=== Current analysts ===
* Denotes relief presenter

Analyst	Duration
Paul Merson	2006–
Alan McInally	1998–
Michael Dawson	2017–
Clinton Morrison	2018–
Tim Sherwood	2020–
Lee Hendrie	2020–
Kris Boyd	2020–
Jamie Mackie	2020–
Matt Murray	2012–
Sue Smith	2018–
Jobi McAnuff	2021–
Mike Dean	2023–

=== Previous analysts ===
List includes both full time regular analysts, guests and reliefs.

Analyst	Duration
Glenn Murray	2023
Robert Earnshaw	2023
Karen Carney	2022
Danny Mills	2021, 2023
Neil Lennon	2021
Gerry Taggart	2021
Gary Caldwell	2021
Ryan Lowe	2021
Jermaine Beckford	2021
Charlie Austin	2021
Sean St Ledger	2021
Mark Wright	2021
Kenny Miller	2021, 2022
Ally McCoist	2020–2021
Daniel Gabbidon	2020
Shaun Goater	2020
Paul Cook	2020
Gareth Ainsworth	2020, 2021, 2022
Gary Rowett	2019, 2020, 2021
Francis Benali	2019, 2021
Gary O'Neil	2019, 2020
Emile Heskey	2019
Troy Deeney	2019
Andy Hinchcliffe	2019
Danny Cowley	2019
Lee Bowyer	2018, 2020
Kelly Smith	2011, 2022
Shola Ameobi	2018, 2019
Steve Cotterill	2017, 2018
Paul Heckingbottom	2017
Paul Robinson	2017
Joleon Lescott	2015–2021
Niall Quinn	2015–2016
David Prutton	2015, 2017
Ryan Mason	2015, 2018
Peter Schmeichel	2015
Dwight Yorke	2015
Mark Schwarzer	2015
Glen Johnson	2014–2021
Neil Mellor	2014–2021
Karl Robinson	2014
Shaun Derry	2014
Dietmar Hamann	2013
Jimmy Bullard	2013
Robbie Fowler	2012
Sean Dyche	2012
Tony Pulis	2012, 2013, 2014, 2020
Phil Babb	2011, 2022
Jamie Carragher	2011
Aidy Boothroyd	2011
Dion Dublin	2010, 2019, 2020, 2021
Graeme Sharp	2010, 2012, 2013
Iain Dowie	2009–2021
Paul Jewell	2009–2017
Scott Minto	2008–2012
Billy Davies	2008
Jimmy-Floyd Hasselbaink	2008
Tony Gale	2006–2021
Ian Rush	2006, 2008, 2009, 2010
Peter Beagrie	2006, 2008, 2009–2010
Peter Reid	2006–2007
Paul Walsh	2005–2021
Neil Warnock	2005, 2014, 2020, 2022
John Salako	2005–2013
John Aldridge	2005, 2010–2011
Matt Le Tissier	2004–2020
John Gregory	2004–2005
Tony Cottee	2003–2021
David Ginola	2003
Brian Little	2003
Jan Molby	2003
Lou Macari	2003
George Burley	2003, 2005, 2006
Gordon McQueen	2003–2011
Nigel Spackman	2002–2004
Chris Coleman	2001, 2010
Charlie Nicholas	2000–2020
Alan Mullery	2000–2004
Mark McGhee	2000, 2006
Chris Kamara	1999–2021
Phil Thompson	1998–2020
Frank McLintock	1998–2006
Rodney Marsh	1998–2004
George Best	1998–2004
Clive Allen	1998–2001

Main Presenters and Analysts gallery

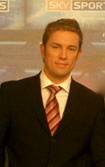
Simon Thomas (2023–present)

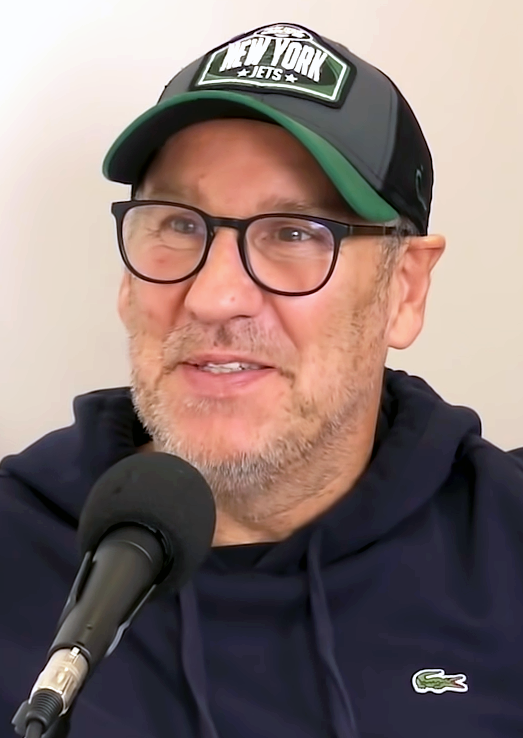
Paul Merson (2006–present)

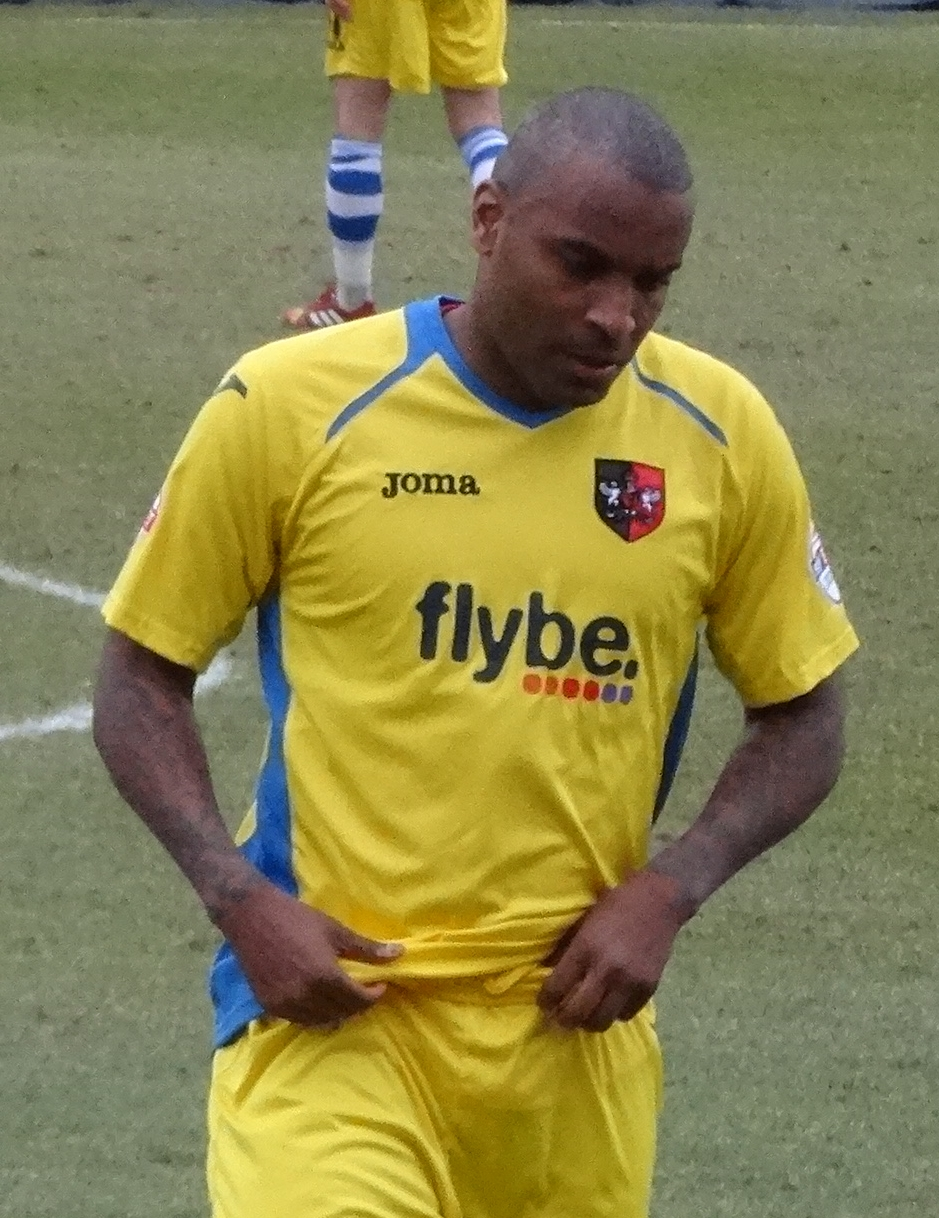
Clinton Morrison (2018–present)

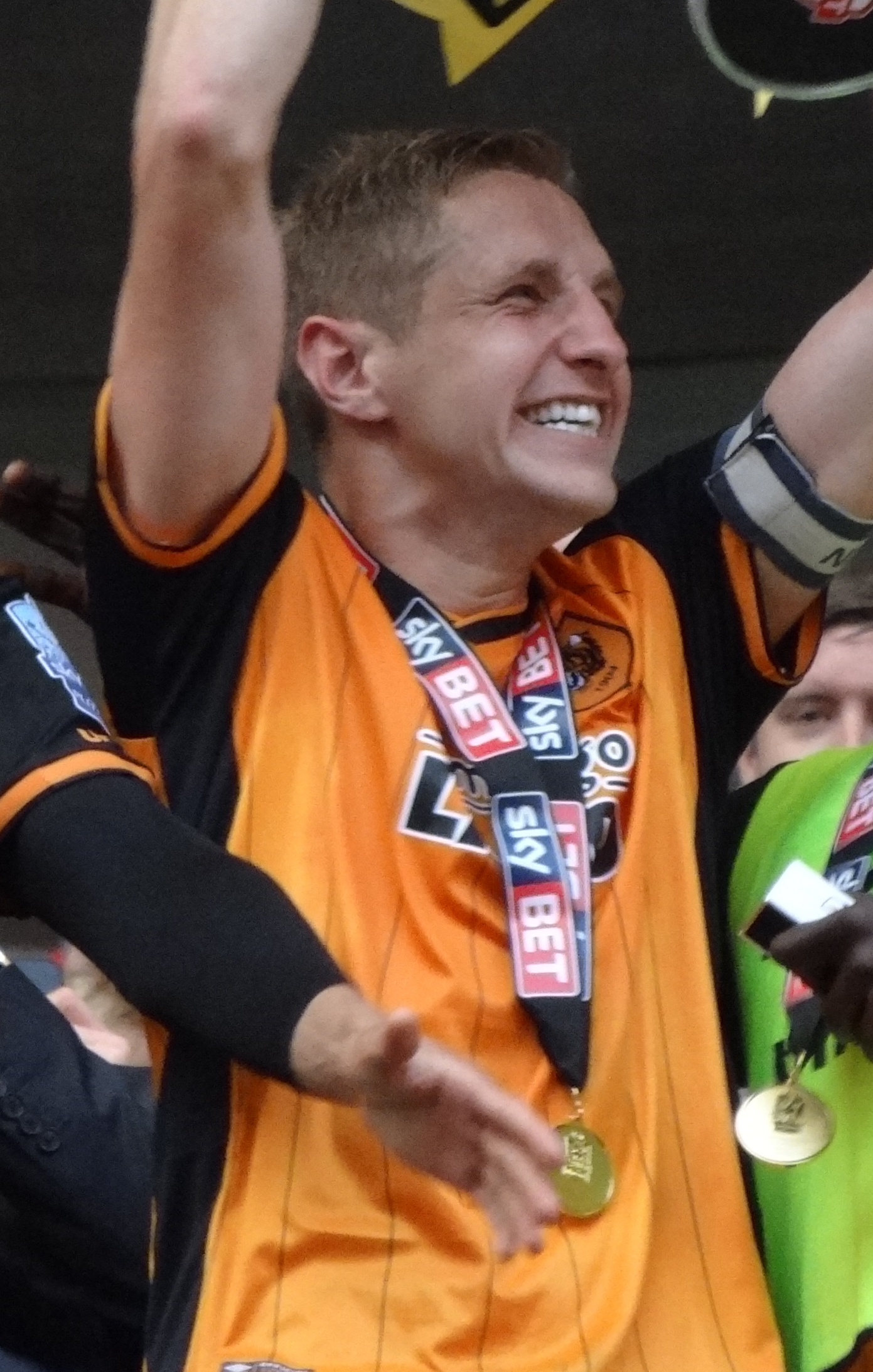
Michael Dawson (2017–present)

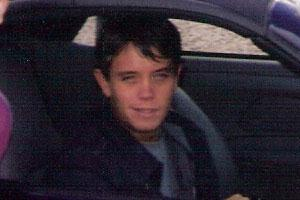
Lee Hendrie (2020–present)

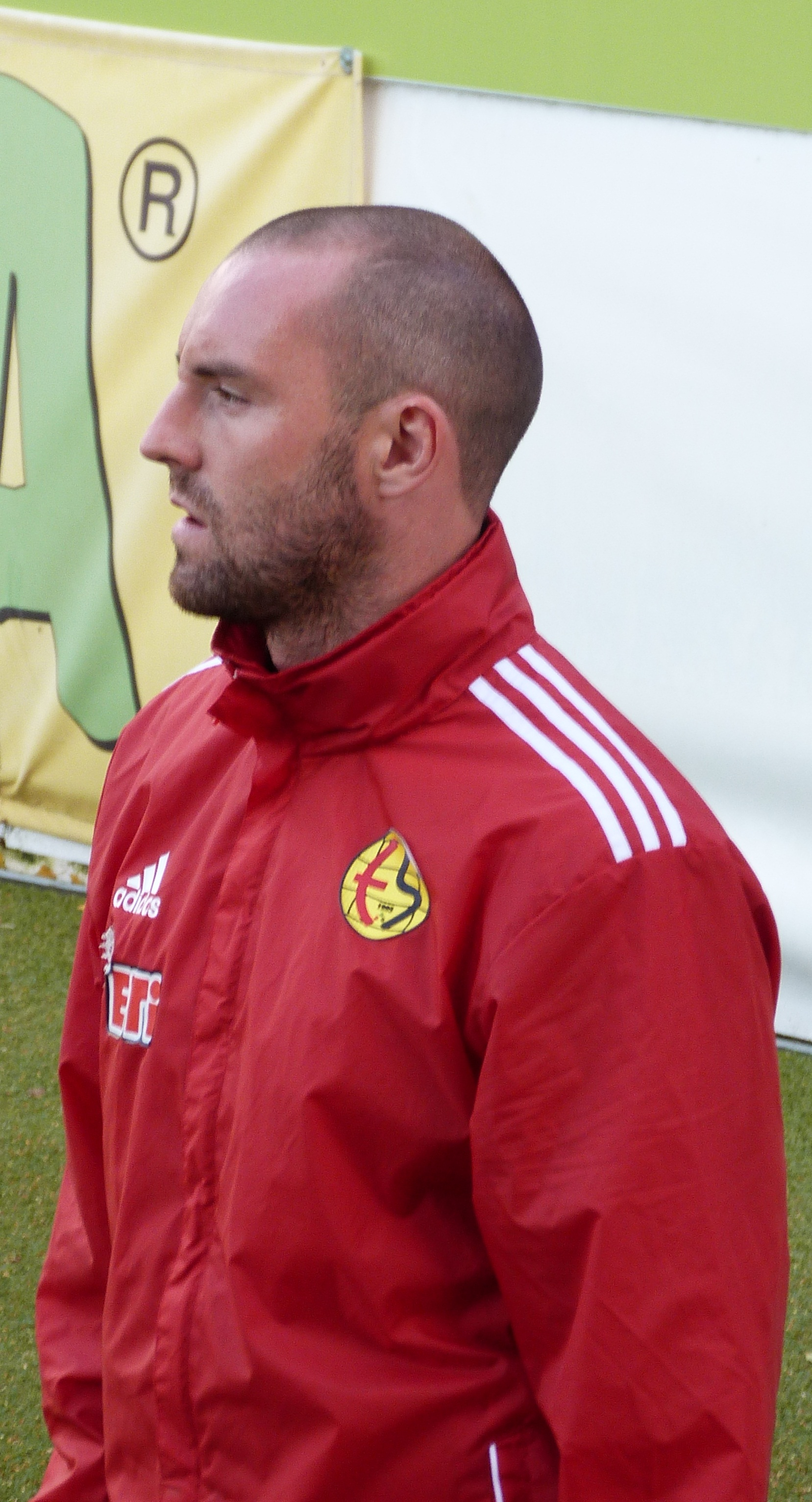
Kris Boyd (2020–present)

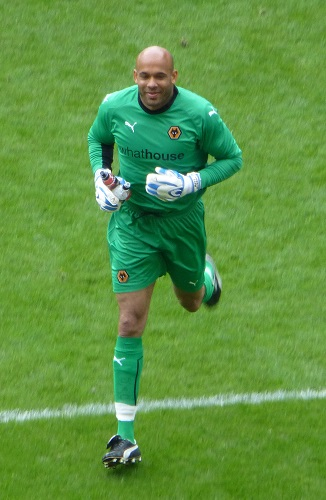
Matt Murray (2012–present)

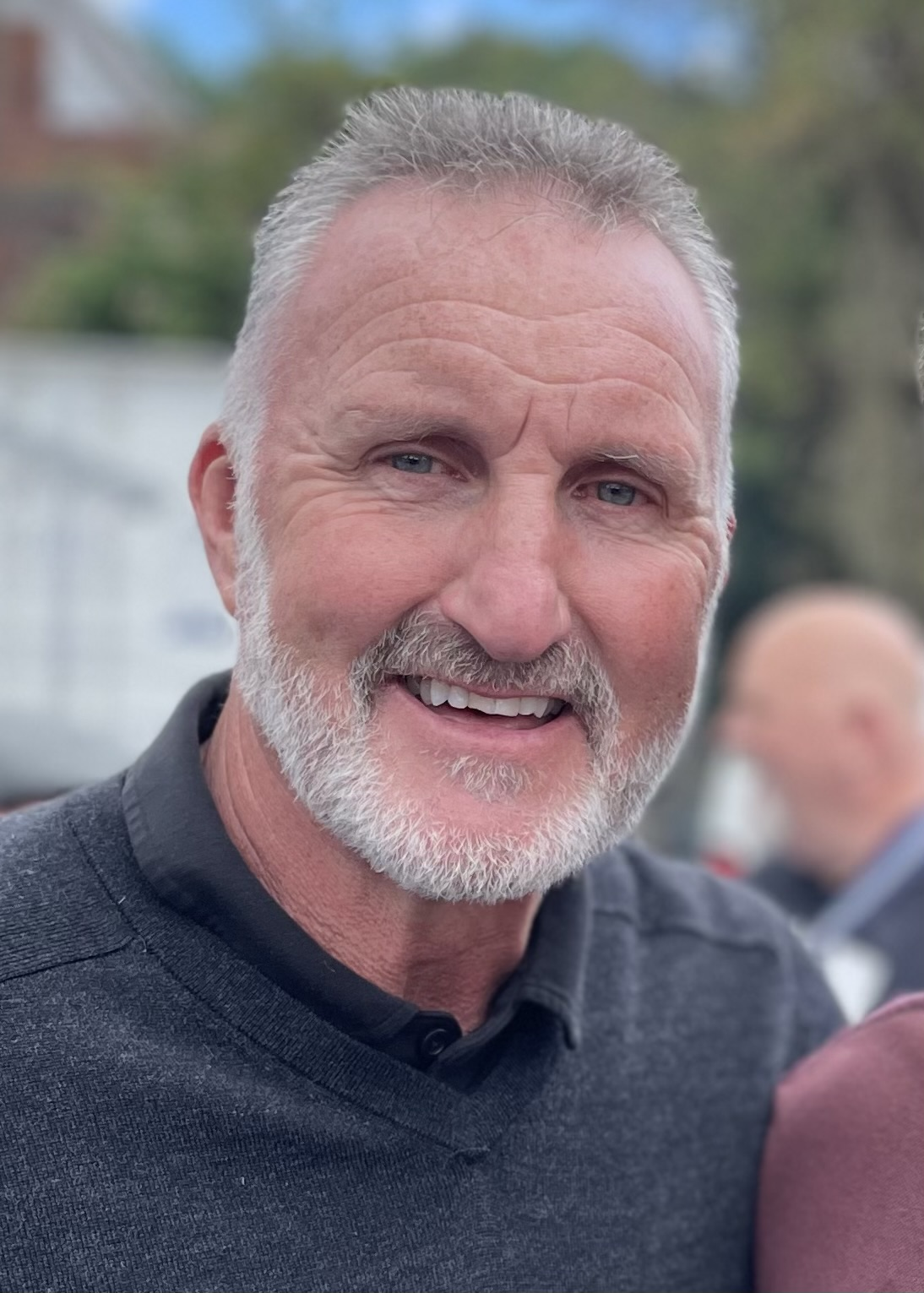
Alan McInally (1998–present)

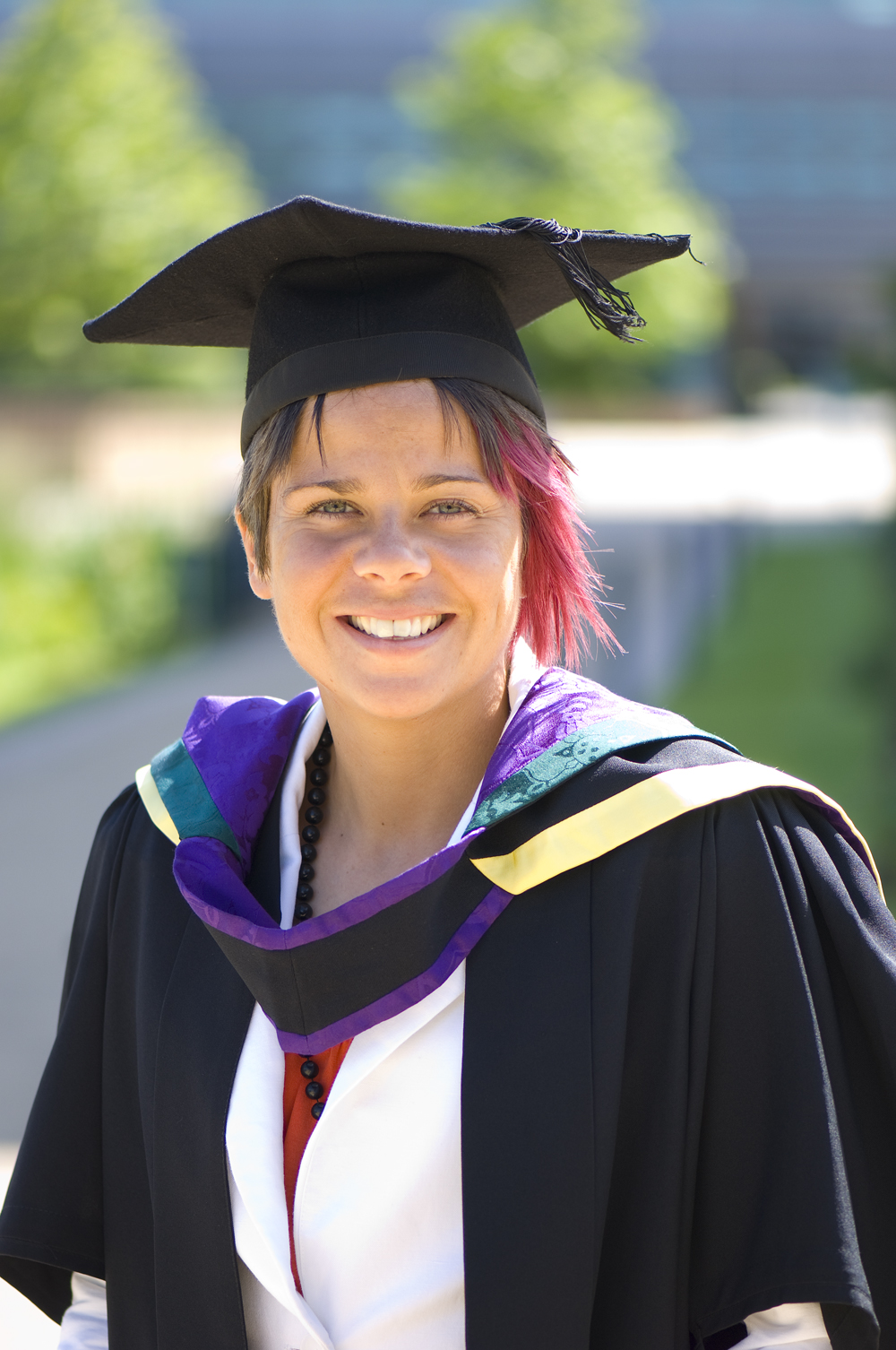
Sue Smith (2018–present)

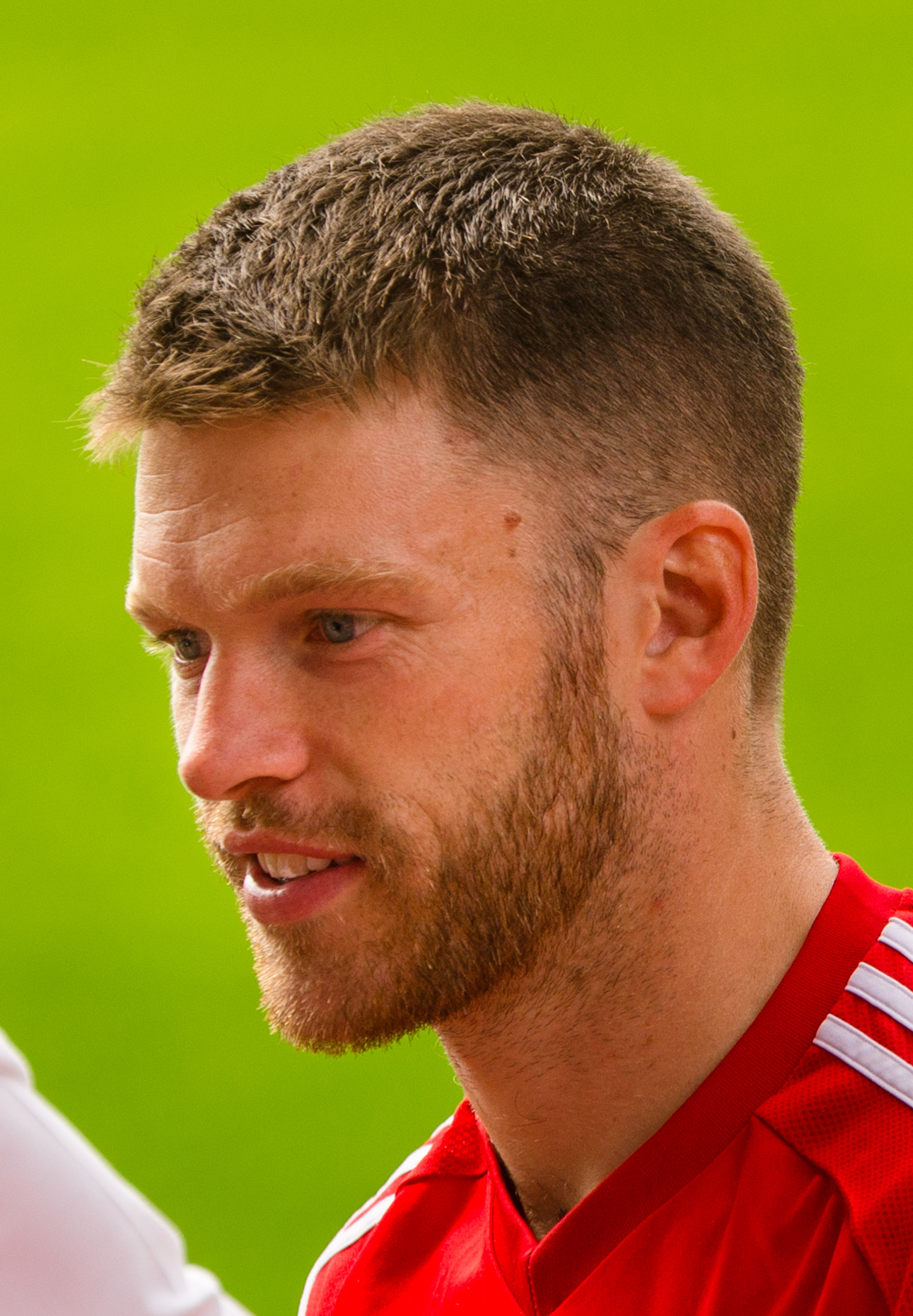
Jamie Mackie (2020–present)

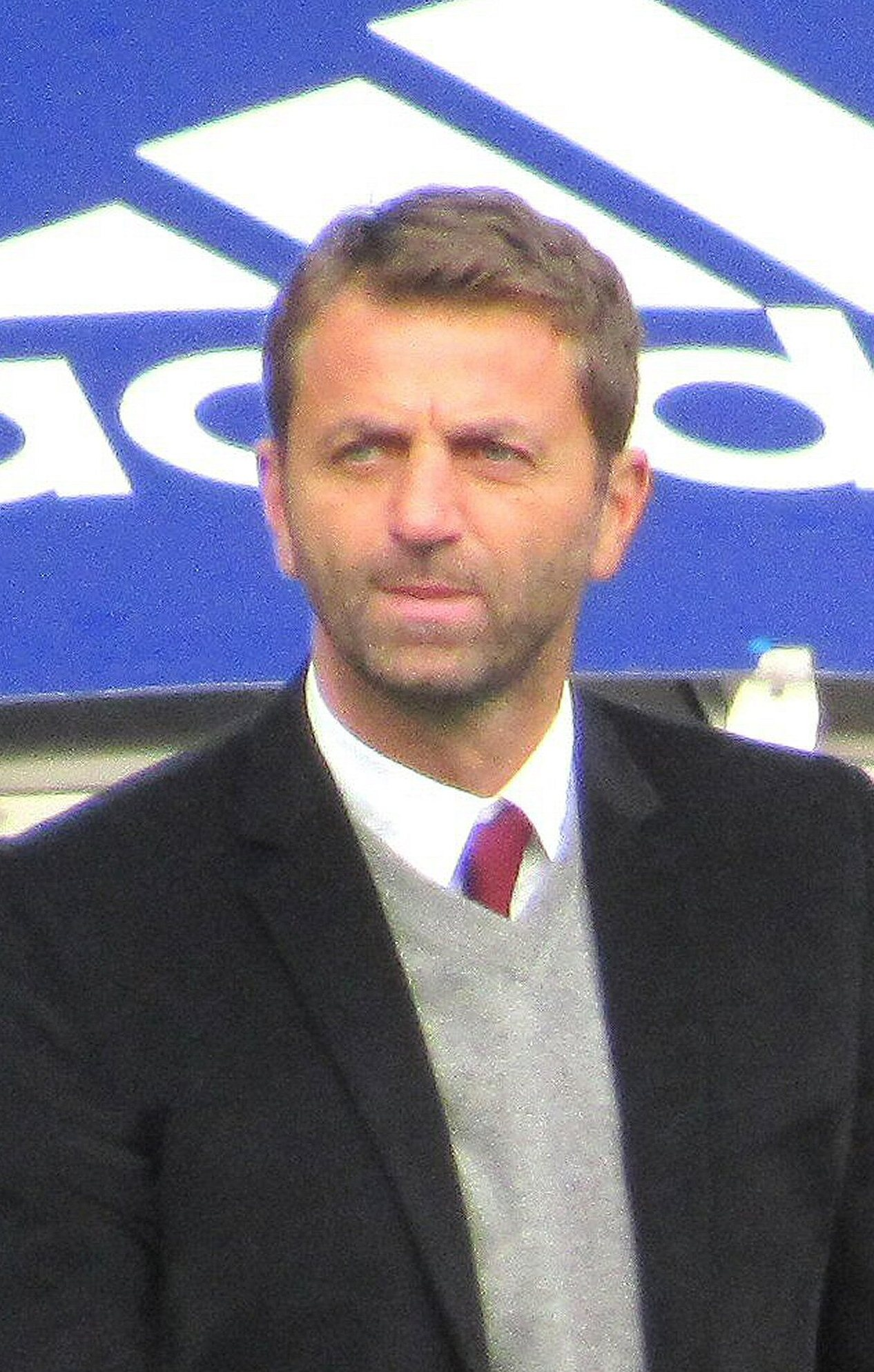
Tim Sherwood (2020–present)

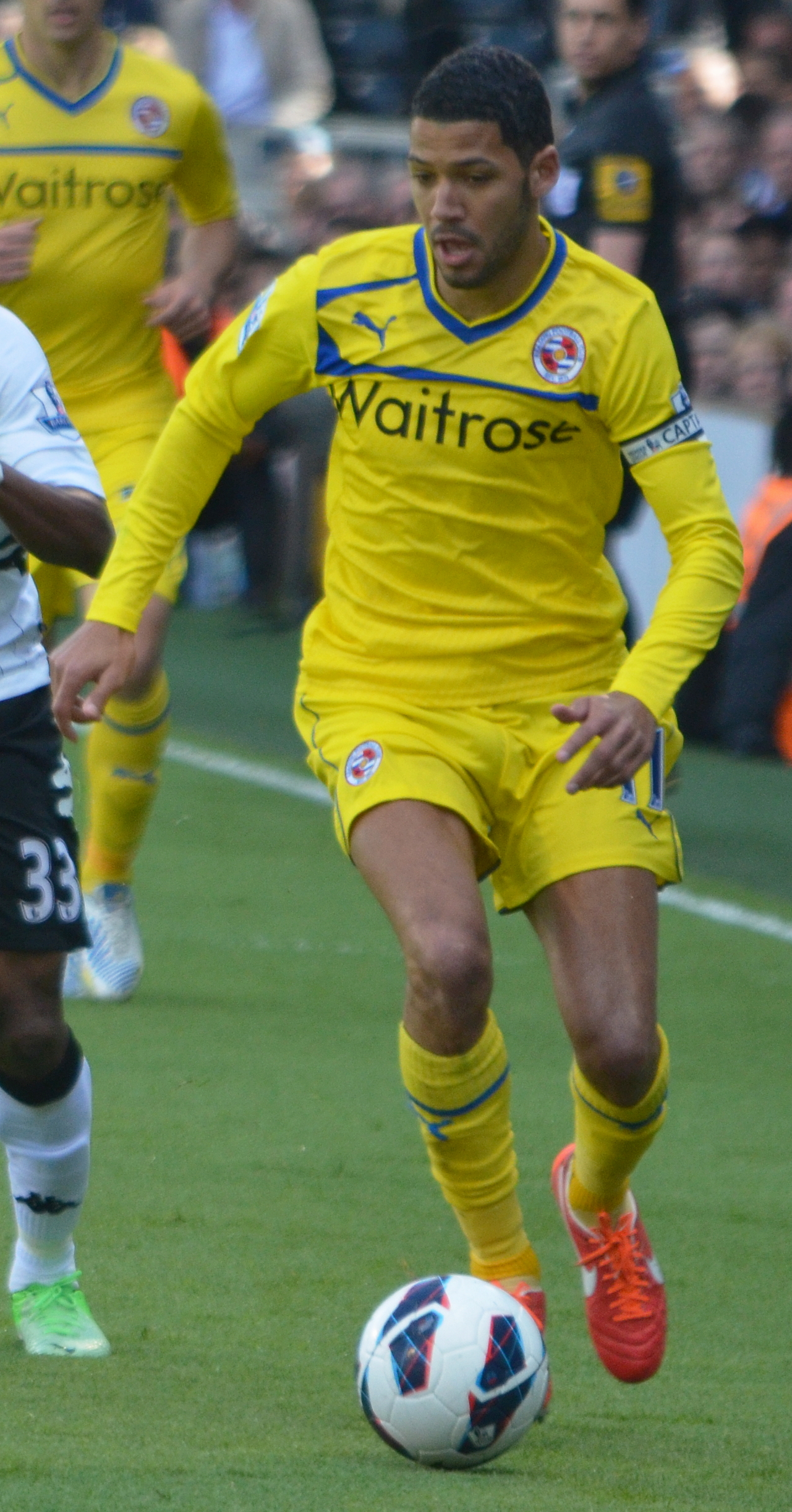
Jobi McAnuff (2021–present)

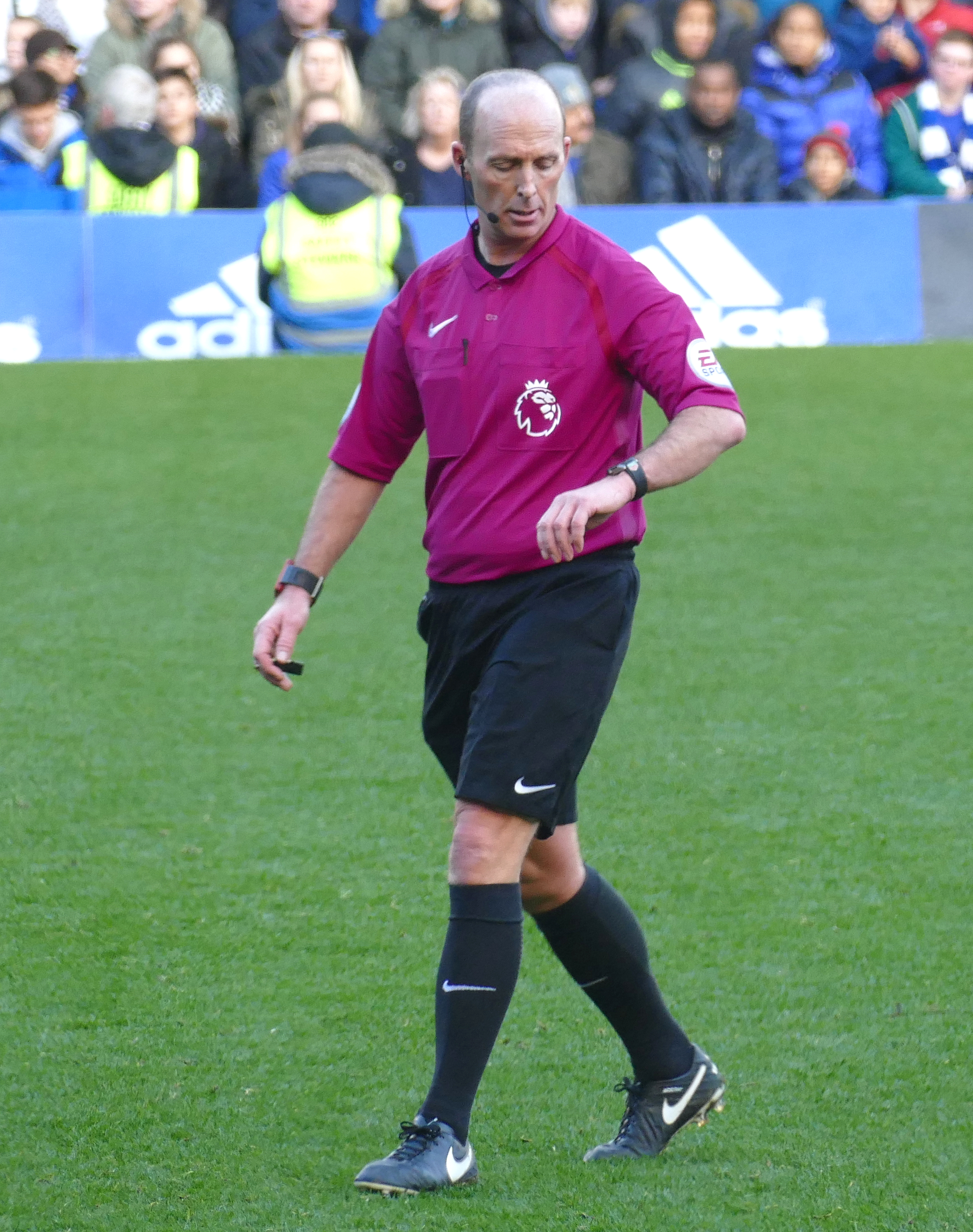
Mike Dean (2023–present)

== In popular culture ==
In the Apple TV+ series Ted Lasso, character Roy Kent serves as a pundit on the show alongside Stelling and Kamara.

== See also ==
- Final Score, a similar programme which is broadcast by the BBC
- BT Sport Score, a similar programme, broadcast by BT Sport from 2016 to 2023
- The Goal Rush, a football results programme broadcast by ITV from 2001 to 2003
