= Brent Sadler =

American journalist

Brent Sadler (born 1950 in Manchester) is a British journalist and former CNN Senior International Correspondent.

== Early life ==
Brent is the son of Philip Sadler. He has a half-brother. He was educated at the Royal Masonic School for Boys and Harris College, Preston, now the school of Journalism, Media and Communication, University of Central Lancashire, where he gained a Diploma in Journalism Studies.

== Career ==
After his studies, Sadler worked as a reporter for the Harrow Observer and Reading Evening Post, and then for Southern Television in Southampton, UK, Westward Television in Plymouth, UK and HTV Bristol. In 1981, he moved to ITN where he was promoted from the position of a news reporter to the position of Middle East correspondent. In 1991, he joined CNN where he spent two decades covering the world but spent most of his time in the Middle East. In 2009, he became a presenter for the program ‘Inside the Middle East’ on the CNN network.

Sadler is perhaps best known for his work in covering the Gulf Wars while he was ITN's Middle East Correspondent and later CNN's Beirut Bureau Chief. He has covered wars in Chad, Libya, Uganda, Iran, Iraq, Lebanon, Israel, Iraqi Kurdistan and the Falklands.

== Awards ==
Sadler has won numerous individual and team awards over his career. He won the RTS Regional News Award in 1980, the RTS International News Award in 1987 and with the ITN team, won the BAFTA for the quality of coverage while in Lebanon in 1983. While with CNN his team won the Emmy for their program ‘Saving Somalia’. He has reported from around the world on many conflicts and won a BAFTA award for Best Actuality Coverage of the Gulf War and an Overseas Press Club of America Award for Meritorious Reporting.

== Personal life ==
Brent has a daughter with his first wife, Janis Christmas, whom he divorced in the mid-1970s. He has another daughter, born in 1989, with his second wife, Debby, whom he married in 1985. He married his third wife, author Tess Stimson, on 17 July 1993. They have two sons, the first born in 1994. Sadler married his fourth wife, Dr Jelena Anicic, a former News Producer for CNN, in 2003.
