= Collaboration (magazine) =

American magazine

Collaboration is an American magazine dedicated to the spiritual and evolutionary vision of Sri Aurobindo and The Mother. The magazine was founded in 1974. Content includes articles, essays, poetry, and art. Topics range across the theory and practice of Integral Yoga, the place of humankind in the universe, consciousness, and transformation. It is published three times per year.
