= The Collaborators (film) =

- Directed by: Andrew Smith; Dan Ollerhead
- Written by: John Hardwick
- Produced by: Liam Powell; Becky Somers
- Starring: Kerry Carroll; Roisin McCusker; Roger Rowley
- Production company: Breech Films
- Release date: 10 December 2015
- Running time: 96 minutes
- Country: United Kingdom
- Language: English

The Collaborators is a 2015 independent British crime drama feature film directed by Andrew Smith and Dan Ollerhead. It was written by Svengali director John Hardwick.

== Plot ==
Two art students are forced to take off across country in a stolen taxi to evade the law after they are caught up in a dangerous mix of sex, drugs and violence.

== Production ==
Funding for the film was partially provided by University of Central Lancashire, as well support from Kickstarter backers. The Kickstarter campaign successfully reached its funding goal of £5000 on 5 March 2015.

The film was shot in and around Preston, Lancashire.
