= Rob McCaffrey =

British television presenter (born 1963)

Robert Andrew McCaffrey (born 1963) is a British television presenter. He is most notable for presenting shows such as Goals On Sunday and You're On Sky Sports. McCaffrey also replaced Jeff Stelling as presenter of Soccer Special (the midweek version of Soccer Saturday) and enjoyed a spell presenting live Conference National matches.

After earlier education in Edinburgh, McCaffrey earned a Bachelor's degree at the University of Liverpool and studied for a post-graduate degree in journalism at the school of Journalism, Media and Communication, University of Central Lancashire.

After minor jobs at local radio stations in and around Nottingham, McCaffrey joined Radio Merseyside in 1986, becoming a news reporter. Two years later he graduated to the rank of News Producer at BBC Radio Shropshire but left to start a career in television in 1987.

Starting at Granada TV he presented and reported on local programmes, including North-West football show Kick-Off and Rugby League Live. Colleagues there included Clive Tyldesley, Elton Welsby and Rob Palmer, now also at Sky Sports.

McCaffrey was nominated for a Royal Television Society award for a documentary he produced featuring John Barnes and an interview with Nelson Mandela. The programme was filmed in 1994 during Liverpool F.C.'s preseason tour to South Africa.

Before joining Sky Sports as host of You're On Sky Sports, McCaffrey spent some time as a radio presenter at Talksport.

McCaffrey is managed by RAM Sports Management, Rodney Marsh's agency. McCaffrey actually hosted the phone-in show for which Marsh was sacked by Sky for "a tasteless remark" regarding the Asian tsunami attacks.

McCaffrey is a lifelong Liverpool F.C. fan.

McCaffrey has also presented a number of Manchester United and Liverpool videos.

In June 2007 McCaffrey was signed up by Showtime Arabia to present their English Premiership coverage, which began at the start of the 2007/08 season, this led to McCaffrey leaving his role on Goals on Sunday.

McCaffrey trialled for the 2006 edition of Sky One's The Match programme, in which celebrities train for a football match against ex-professionals. He was disappointed to not be selected, due to a calf strain.

McCaffrey hosted the World Cup and the European Championships for beIN Sports in Qatar.
