= William Watt (journalist) =

English sports journalist

William "Will" Watt is a former English journalist working as Head of Football Operations at Fleetwood Town Football Club.

Watt gained a master's degree at the University of Central Lancashire in Journalism before taking up the role of Digital Sports Reporter at the Lancashire Evening Post, a role he held for two years. He moved to the Blackpool Gazette in 2009, where he took the role of Digital Editor. As part of his role, he was also number two Blackpool F.C. football writer, behind Steve Canavan.

In 2010, he was awarded "Digital Journalist of the Year" in the North West at the O2 Media Awards.

In June 2012, he was named head Blackpool F.C. writer at the Blackpool Gazette after Steve Canavan made a lateral move. He also became part of BBC Radio Lancashire's match day coverage team, working as a summariser during live commentary of Blackpool's games.

In October 2013, he was shortlisted for the O2 Media Awards' "Sports Reporter of the Year" award.

Will's reporting on the decline of Blackpool FC gained national recognition and praise in 2015, with nominations for two awards in September of that month, whilst also gaining recognition on Twitter for his coverage of Blackpool FC.

He was shortlisted for Sports Journalist of the Year at the O2 Media Awards and Football Journalist of the Year at the NW Football Awards.

In the summer of 2016, he was approached by Fleetwood Town FC to take the role of Head of Communications at the club. Six months later, he was promoted to be the club's Head of First Team Operations and Communications, under Uwe Rosler's management in 2017. In February 2020, Will became the club's Head of Football Operations.
