= Mark Tattersall =

Mark Tattersall (born 31 December 1984, Preston) is a journalist, and former news reporter for ITV programme Granada Reports.

Tattersall grew up in Preston and attended Hutton Grammar School and University of Central Lancashire. He was a reporter for ITV news program Granada Reports and ITV News. He left in 2012.

He has been the executive producer at Artlab Films, based in London and Preston and now works with True North at their offices in Leeds and Manchester. He is known for making access-based observational documentaries.
