= The Pledge (British TV programme) =

Panel discussion programme, broadcast weekly on Sky News

- Genre: Panel discussion
- Countries of origin: United Kingdom (Broadcast internationally)
- Original language: English
- No. of seasons: 10

Production
- Production locations: Studio F (Sky 2), Osterley, London
- Camera setup: Multi-camera
- Running time: 60 minutes
- Production company: Sky plc

Original release
- Network: Sky News
- Release: 21 April 2016 – March 2020

The Pledge is a panel discussion programme broadcast on Sky News. There are currently ten panellists, five of whom appear on the show each week. They discuss a variety of topics – there is no presenter, so each panellist champions a topic which is then debated.

The programme was first announced in April 2016, and the first episode aired later that month, on 21 April 2016. The show is known for at times being controversial, and debates often get heated.

The Pledge is currently not on air having been suspended in March 2020 due to the COVID-19 pandemic.

== Format ==
Each show comprises five panellists from various professions in the entertainment and journalism industries. Each panellist chooses a subject, then clearly states their argument before passing it to the table. The panellists are then given the chance to challenge the person if they disagree and debate it. Topics discussed cover topical issues in the news such as politics and current affairs.

== Broadcasts ==
The Pledge is pre-recorded on a Thursday in Studio F at Sky Campus in Osterley, and then broadcast on Thursdays at 8pm on Sky News. It is also broadcast on Sundays at 8pm as well as at other times during the week to fill slots.

== Current panel ==
List in alphabetical order.

- Lord Karan Bilimoria, entrepreneur and founder of Cobra Beer
- ‘Big’ Phil Campion, former SAS trooper and author
- Michelle Dewberry, businesswoman and winner of The Apprentice
- Greg Dyke, former TV executive and FA chairman
- Nick Ferrari, radio talk show host on LBC
- Afua Hirsch, writer and journalist (former Social Affairs and Education Editor at Sky News)
- Rachel Johnson, novelist and journalist
- Carole Malone, TV presenter, broadcaster and journalist
- Maajid Nawaz, columnist, broadcaster and politician
- Femi Oluwole, political campaigner
- Trevor Phillips, broadcaster and writer
- June Sarpong, TV presenter and pro-EU campaigner
- Rachel Shabi, journalist

== Original panel ==
List in alphabetical order.

- Emma Barnett, broadcaster and journalist
- James Caan, entrepreneur and former Dragons’ Den investor
- Michelle Dewberry
- Greg Dyke
- Nick Ferrari
- Rachel Johnson, journalist
- Graeme Le Saux, former Chelsea and England footballer
- Baroness Mone, Baroness of Mayfair and entrepreneur
- June Sarpong

== Transmissions ==
=== Series ===
| Series | Start date | End date | Episodes |
|---|---|---|---|
| 1 | 21 April 2016 | 4 August 2016 | 16 |
| 2 | 8 September 2016 | 15 December 2016 | 15 |
| 3 | 12 January 2017 | 6 April 2017 | 13 |
| 4 | 20 April 2017 | 27 July 2017 | 14 |
| 5 | 7 September 2017 | 14 December 2017 | 15 |
| 6 | 18 January 2018 | 29 March 2018 | 11 |
| 7 | 12 April 2018 | 26 July 2018 | 16 |
