= You're On Sky Sports =

You're on Sky Sports is a topical football phone-in discussion television programme that was broadcast on Sky Sports 1 and Sky Sports News Radio. Originally hosted by Rob Hawthorne then Rob McCaffrey and Gary Newbon, the show was chaired by Jason Cundy. There will always be one or two panel members, whether former football professionals or others involved with the game in some form. Regulars include Steve Claridge, Kenny Sansom, Peter Beagrie, Tony Gale and Warren Barton. The program usually aired at 10pm either the night of a UEFA Champions League match or a Premier League match that is aired on Sky Sports.

From the start of the 2007–08 season, YOSS has regularly broadcast at 7.30pm on Saturday evenings for 55 minutes, and every Wednesday evening around 10pm for 90 minutes. Cundy hosts proceedings the majority of the time, other presenters are Geoff Shreeves, Paul Hawksbee and Chloe Everton.

== Former features ==
The program previously featured a section entitled "The Press Perspective" where a major national newspaper's head Sports Writer phones in to discuss the football topics of the week. Henry Winter of The Daily Telegraph and Shaun Custis (albeit Chief Football Writer and not Sports Writer) of The Sun are regulars. Prior to the 2006-07 season, this section was known as "Journo Phono".

Before going to commercial breaks, the show also featured a piece of football trivia, again often relating to statistics or records broken in recent football matches. This mini-segment was once entitled "Stat's The Way the Footy Rumbles," a play on the phrase "that's the way the cookie crumbles", but is now known as "Stat's The Way I Like It".

== Incidents ==
Rodney Marsh was famously sacked by Sky Sports in January 2005 after a making a joke about the Asian tsunami that was judged to be in bad taste, saying: "David Beckham has turned down a move to Newcastle United because of trouble with the Toon Army in Asia". Marsh apologised on air, but this was not enough to save his job.
