= Jeff Stelling =

British sports broadcaster (born 1955)

Jeff Stelling MBE
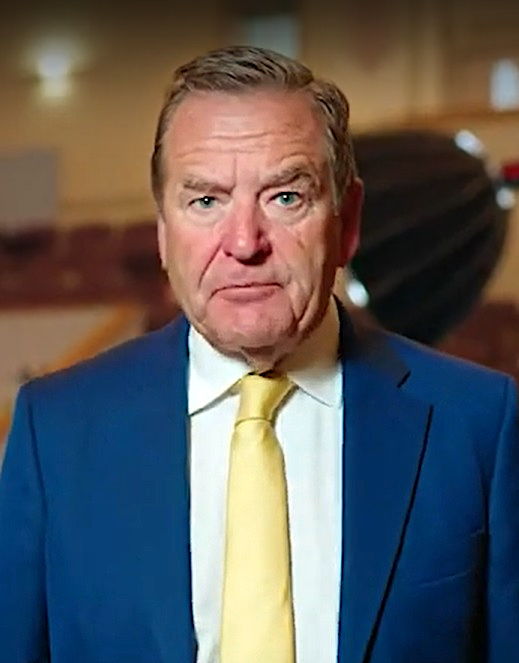
- Stelling in 2021
- Born: 18 March 1955 (age 71); Hartlepool, County Durham, England
- Occupations: Journalist, television presenter
- Years active: 1978–present
- Television: Soccer Saturday; Countdown; Alphabetical; Sky Sports News
- Spouse: Liz Stelling (m. 1998)
- Children: 3

Robert Jeffrey Stelling (born 18 March 1955) is an English television presenter. He presented Soccer Saturday for Sky Sports for 29 years, from 1994 until May 2023. He hosted coverage of the Champions League between 2011 and 2015. He also presented the Channel 4 quiz show Countdown (2009–2011) and ITV game show Alphabetical (2016–2017).

Since 4 December 2023, Stelling has been a presenter on Talksport's breakfast show every Monday and Tuesday (6am to 10am) alongside Ally McCoist.

== Early life ==
Stelling was brought up in a council house in Hartlepool. He attended Rift House Primary School and West Hartlepool Grammar School. After leaving school his first job was as a journalist at the Hartlepool Mail, where he remained for four years.

== Career ==
His first broadcasting position was as a reporter on Middlesbrough F.C. on Radio Tees in the late 1970s. He was a sports presenter on London's LBC Radio Sportswatch programme in the early 1980s before moving to BBC Radio 2's weekend sports programme Sport on 2, covering the Los Angeles and Seoul Olympic Games.

He later spent time as a sports newsreader at TV-am, Channel 4, Eurosport and British Satellite Broadcasting before moving to Sky in 1992 to present coverage of horse racing, greyhound racing, snooker and darts. In 2003, he won a sports presenter special edition of The Weakest Link. In 2004, Stelling was offered, but rejected, an offer from the BBC to host Score — their new Saturday results service. Ray Stubbs was appointed as the presenter.

In May 2013, Stelling joined twentyfour7 Football Magazine and wrote columns for the magazine's Dream Team. He has also been featured in the in-game presentation work for EA Sports' FIFA 14 and FIFA 15.

=== Sports/Soccer Saturday ===
In 1994, Stelling became presenter of Sports Saturday, which became Gillette Soccer Saturday in 1998, hosting a programme lasting up to six hours of football discussion and live reports on the afternoon's games with a panel of pundits including Frank McLintock, Chris Kamara, Rodney Marsh and George Best. Much of the programme's popularity was put down to Stelling, with The Guardian praising him for "exceptional professionalism and élan". In October 2021, he announced that he would be leaving the show at the end of the football season. However, in March 2022, it was announced Stelling would be staying until at least the end of the 2022–23 season.

At the start of the 2005–06 Premiership football season, Stelling replaced Ian Payne as the host of Sky Sports' Monday Night Football programme. However, Stelling's appointment coincided with a new, shorter format of the programme, with Stelling presenting the show live from the ground of that evening's game. Previously, the show had been presented from a studio, and had featured some coverage of the prior weekend's games. Moreover, in previous years on Monday nights without a live game, a Monday Night Football Special would be broadcast, which included only the analysis from the weekend's games.

In 2011, Stelling replaced the departed Richard Keys as the main presenter of Sky's live Champions League coverage and hosted between 2011 and 2015.

Stelling left Soccer Saturday at the end of the 2022–23 season after 25 years as host.

=== Game shows ===
On 21 November 2008, it was reported that Stelling had been confirmed as the new host of the Channel 4 game show Countdown following the departure of Des O'Connor. Stelling had reportedly also been approached for the role following the death of long-time host Richard Whiteley, but Des Lynam was appointed to the role instead. Stelling began recording Countdown in December 2008, with the show's new assistant Rachel Riley, and started broadcasting in January 2009. However, it was announced on 25 May 2011 that Stelling would be stepping down as presenter of Countdown at the end of the year, after three years at the helm, to concentrate on football, including his new Champions League role. He was replaced by Nick Hewer. Stelling returned to Countdown as a guest in Dictionary Corner in August 2023 and, at the invitation of the host Colin Murray, swapped places to present the final part of the week.

In August 2016, Stelling presented a new 10-part daytime game show for ITV called Alphabetical. The show returned for a second series of 20 episodes in October 2017.

=== TV series cameos ===
Stelling appears as himself in a number of episodes of the football comedy TV series Ted Lasso. He has also appeared as himself in The IT Crowd, Dream Team and Mike Bassett: Manager. He appeared in an advert for Sky Broadband in 2013 which spoofed a previous Sky Broadband advert which starred Bruce Willis.

=== Radio work ===
From 4 December 2023, Stelling began presenting Talksport's breakfast show every Monday and Tuesday (6am to 10am) alongside Ally McCoist.

=== Podcast ===
In April 2026, Stelling teamed up with OLBG, being named as their new brand ambassador. The partnership also saw the launch of the podcast, The Jeff Stelling Show. Marc White, manager and owner of the OLBG-sponsored Dorking Wanderers, was a guest on the inaugural episode. Former England manager Glenn Hoddle has also featured, as have members of Leicester City's Premier League-winning squad, Danny Simpson and Wes Morgan.

== Honours and recognition ==
On 23 November 2007, he was awarded an honorary Doctor of Professional Studies by the University of Teesside.

Stelling was named Sports Broadcaster of the Year for four successive years by the Sports Journalists' Association, based on a poll of its members.

On 12 March 2010, he was granted the title of honorary freeman of his home town of Hartlepool, along with the town's former MP Peter Mandelson.

Stelling was appointed Member of the Order of the British Empire (MBE) in the 2024 New Year Honours for services to sport, broadcasting and charity.

== Personal life ==
Stelling lives in Bishop's Waltham, Hampshire, with his wife Liz and two sons, born in 1998 and 1999, and a daughter, born in 2003. They were married in November 1998 in Richmond upon Thames.

Stelling has completed the London Marathon on eight occasions and his best time is 3 hours and 28 minutes. In June 2013, Stelling, Colin Cooper, Craig Hignett and 12 others climbed Mount Kilimanjaro raising money for the children's charity The Finlay Cooper Fund. The climb raised £100,000.

In 2015, Stelling was appointed president of Hartlepool United after accepting an invitation from the club's owners.

In 2016, Stelling walked 262 miles from Hartlepool United's Victoria Park to Wembley Stadium over 10 days raising over £420,000 for Prostate Cancer UK. He walked with his friend Russ Green, who was the Chief Executive of Hartlepool United at the time, and was joined by over 400 walkers including his friends from Sky Sports and the football world such as Chris Kamara, Matt Le Tissier, Charlie Nicholas and Paul Merson. On Day 3, Sir Ian Botham arrived to lend his support and walked with Stelling to Glanford Park, the home of Scunthorpe United, one of Botham's former clubs from his football career.

In 2017, Stelling again pledged to walk to raise money for Prostate Cancer UK.

In his book, I've Got Mail, published on 17 September 2020, Stelling revealed he had been subject to a blackmail attempt via two letters sent to his home. The letters demanded a £50,000 payment in return for bogus accusations of sex assaults to be kept quiet. In a radio interview on BBC Radio 5 Live on 2 December 2020, Stelling recounted sharing the letters with his wife and together, through a family friend's contact at Scotland Yard, they learnt others had also been targeted by the same scammers.
