= Ward Jackson (disambiguation) =

Ward Jackson (1928-2004) is an American visual artist and archivist.

Ward Jackson may also refer to:

== People ==
- Barbara Mary Ward Jackson (1914-1981), a British economist and writer on the problems of developing countries
- Charles Ward-Jackson (1869-1930), a British soldier and Conservative Party politician
- Ralph Ward Jackson (1806-1880), a British railway promoter, entrepreneur, politician and founder of West Hartlepool

== Places ==
- Ward-Jackson House, a historic house in Hope, Arkansas, USA
- Ward Jackson Park, a public park in Hartlepool, England
