= John Clay (chaplain) =

British priest (1796–1858)

John Clay B.D.
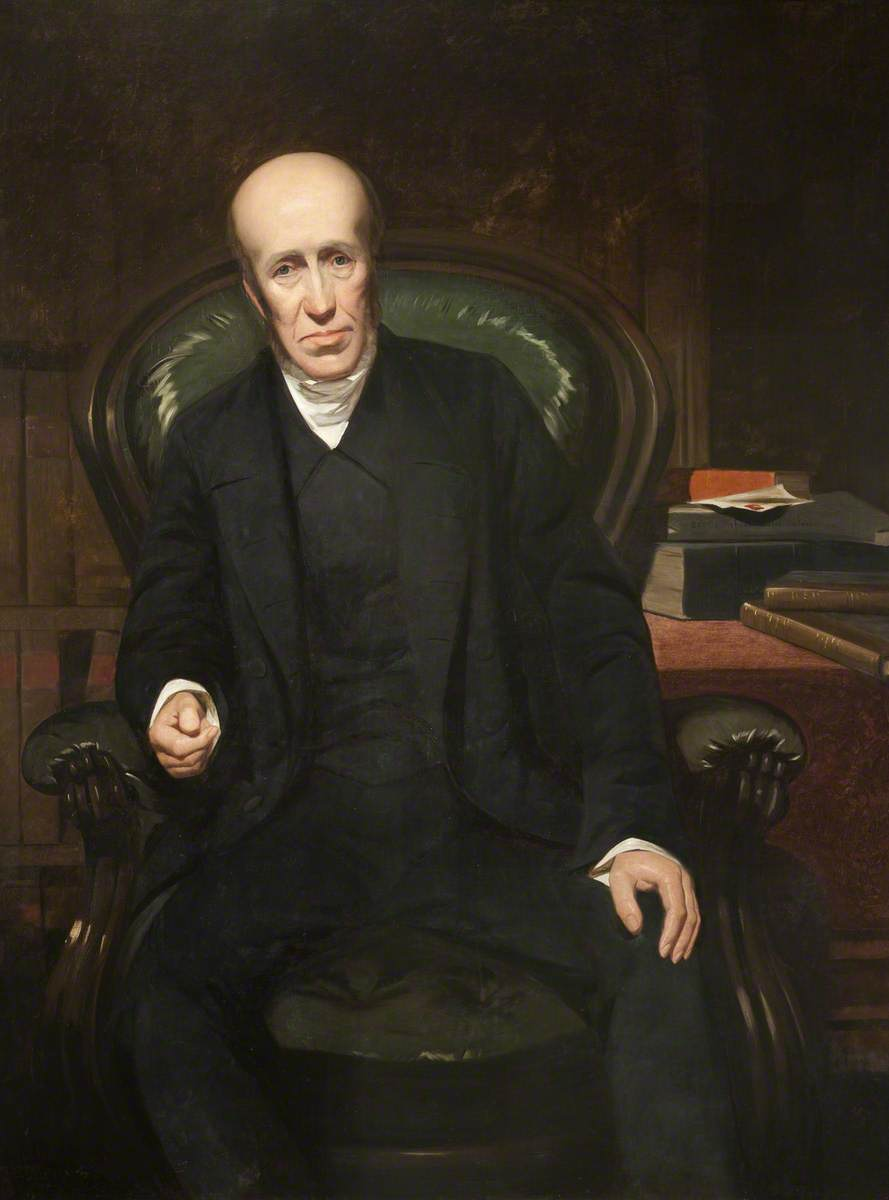
- Portrait of Clay by his son, Alfred Borron Clay
- Born: 1796
- Died: 1858 (aged 61–62)
- Occupation: prison chaplain
- Title: The Reverend

John Clay (1796–1858) was an English cleric and prison chaplain. His reporting on inmates of the prison at Preston, Lancashire made him a national figure.

== Early life ==
John Clay was born in Liverpool on 10 May 1796, the fifth son of Thomas Clay, a ship and anchor smith who died in 1821, and his wife Mary, daughter of Ralph Lowe of Williamson Square, Liverpool, tanner. His father was in the electoral list of 1806 as an ironmonger, resident in Moor Street. His sister Mary married Anthony Swainson, brother of Charles Swainson of Preston, in 1811, and her sister Jane then married Charles Inman in 1817.

Clay received a commercial education and his son's memoir states that he attended just one school, with Mr Wylie. This was the Roscoe Street "commercial and classical academy" run by the minister David Stewart Wylie on the corner of Leece Street, where his "rudiments of Latin" mentioned in the memoir could have been obtained. He had training on bookkeeping. Clay then entered a merchant's office. The failure of his master left him at the age of 21 without employment.

== Ordination in the Church of England ==
At age 21 and out of work, Clay came on a visit to Cooper Hill, Charles Swainson's home in Walton-le-Dale near Preston, around 1817. He stayed on as a long-term guest. Swainson persuaded Clay to study for the priesthood, and he was tutored by Robert Harris of Preston Grammar School, in the Greek Testament.

After his father's death in 1821, Clay was offered a position as assistant chaplain at the Preston House of Correction. With the chaplaincy as "title for ordination", he was ordained deacon at Kendal on 11 August 1821, a "literate", by George Henry Law. Law was an advocate of graduate clerics, but the process was facilitated by some influential support. On 22 September 1822 Clay was ordained a priest, and soon after was entered as a prospective "ten-years man" at Emmanuel College, Cambridge. He kept the three terms required in 1834–35, when he took his Bachelor of Divinity degree.

== Prison chaplain ==
Preston gaol, under James Liddell, had already innovated by setting prisoners to work in textile companies; that started shortly after his appointment in 1817, and attracted attention. Joseph John Gurney giving evidence to a parliamentary select committee on gaols in 1819 was positive about the initiative, but pointed to a lack of religious instruction. Under the Gaols Act 1823, prisons were permitted to employ a full-time chaplain. Clay became chaplain of the Preston gaol that year and held the post for 36 years. He worked for the reformation and reclamation of prisoners and advocated for the separate system and silence. He spent time with inmates and communicated with their friends.

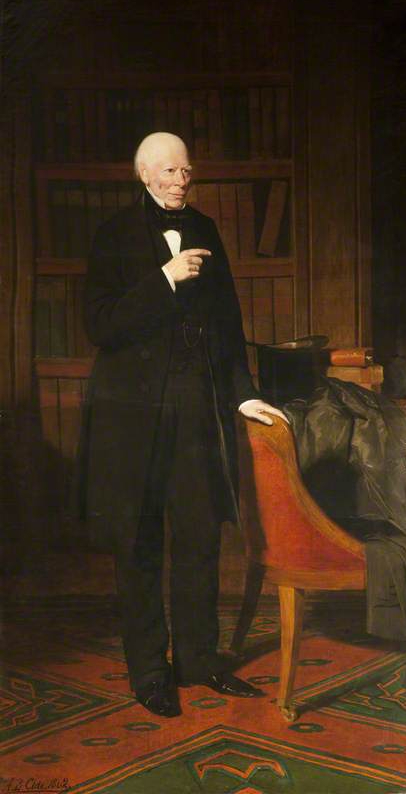
Thomas Batty Addison, recorder of Preston

Preston gaol was under the control of Lancashire magistrates, whose leader was the chairman of quarter sessions. Initially that was Sir Thomas Dalrymple Hesketh, 3rd Baronet, intermittently an ally of Clay. His successor was Thomas Batty Addison, a solid supporter. In Clay's early years the treadmill was introduced, which he concluded was useless. He clashed with Liddell, and for about two years there was a stand-off. Liddell in the end left, after he was criticised in public for using a scold's bridle. He may have lost the magistrates' confidence by leniency to poachers.

Under Clay's influence, the Lancashire magistrates permitted the introduction of the separate system at Preston and Kirkdale Gaol, Liverpool, from 1847. Architectural constraints limited the extent of the changes. On the spectrum of prison philanthropists, Clay's support for the separate system (if modified) placed him with the severe, evangelical group including the prison inspector William Crawford (1788–1847), the Rev. John Field of Reading Gaol, the Rev. George Heaton of Gloucester County Jail, and Whitworth Russell of Millbank Penitentiary, rather than the more moderate Thomas Fowell Buxton and Elizabeth Fry.

Clay was a figure of the Preston strike of 1853–1854. His opinion of the general behaviour of the strikers was high, as expressed to Henry Ashworth; on the other hand he considered that the months of idleness had had a bad effect on the morals of the young women. In a letter of January 1854 to Lord Stanley he reasoned from pawnshop evidence that "reading is becoming necessary to the working-man." He backed the vicar of Preston, John Owen Parr, in suggesting the operatives should compromise with the Preston Masters' Association. His estimates of the numbers of strikers (11,800 female, with more adults than adolescents, 6,200 male with two-thirds adults, few children) are considered credible.

Lord Harrowby, as Chancellor of the Duchy of Lancaster, offered Clay, when he was in financial difficulty, the rectory of Castleford. With conscientious ideas about keeping curates there, he declined the preferment.

== Death ==
Ill-health obliged Clay to resign his chaplaincy in January 1858. He died at Leamington Spa on 21 November 1858. His life and work was praised by the former prison inspector Frederic Hill.

== Penologist and criminologist ==
Clay has also been classed, with Joseph Kingsmill of Pentonville prison, among prison chaplains who "established a body of empirical criminological knowledge". From 1824 Clay began issuing annual reports, to the local magistrates. The details of prison management in time yielded an octavo volume and made him an authority on criminal reform.

In 1836, Clay's annual reports were reprinted in a parliamentary blue book, and in a debate on education three years afterwards Lord John Russell quoted Clay's description of the ignorance of many of the prisoners. In 1847 he gave evidence before Lord Brougham's committee of investigation into the question of the execution of the criminal laws. Henry Grey, 3rd Earl Grey in 1853 quoted Clay's opinion that penal transportation failed to deter younger criminals, in the House of Lords.

Clay published On the Effect of Good or Bad Times on Committals to Prison in 1857. The topic is one on which Clay contributed to the British Association in 1854. His thesis, read in the terms of correlation of the business cycle and sectors of criminality, is concerned with countercyclical variables. In that formulation, Vic Gatrell and Tom Hadden found some support for it, for Lancashire at that period, with crime against the person and crime against property. His overall theory of criminality was multi-factorial, and very largely discounted poverty as a factor. Intemperance in alcohol drinking was seen as attributable to increased wages, and a contributory factor. Thomas Hodgskin wrote articles against Clay's views linking drink and criminality in The Economist, in 1855–6.

== Works ==
Clay was the author of:

- Twenty-five Sermons, 1827.
- Burial Clubs and Infanticide in England. A Letter to W. Brown, esq., M.P., 1854. Clay in this pamphlet, addressed to William Brown, raised concerns about the burial society, a sector of the friendly society movement concerned to provide burial money. His use of statistical evidence was contested in Eliza Cook's Journal.
- A Plain Address to Candidates for Confirmation, 1866.

== Family ==
Clay married, 11 March 1828, Henrietta, third daughter of Henry Fielding of Myerscough and sister of Henry Borron Fielding; she died at Preston on 28 June 1858. Their children included:

- Alfred Borron Clay (1831–1868), second son, artist.
- Walter Lowe Clay, (c.1833–1875), cleric. He published Memoirs of the Rev. John Clay (1861), and Our Convict System (1864). A review of the Memoirs concluded "Next to Robertson of Brighton, Mr Clay of Preston impresses us most with the feeling that he lived a life not of appearance only but of reality."

== In literature ==
In Hard Times (1854) by Charles Dickens, the "experienced chaplain" of the Coketown jail is characterised as having "more tabular statements, outdoing all the previous tabular statements" on how people would "resort to low haunts". This is considered a probable reference to Clay. Clay, who had written to Dickens in March 1853, himself thought it was.
