= Charles Holland =

Charles Holland may refer to:

- Charles Holland (actor, born 1733) (1733–1769), English actor
- Charles Holland (actor, born 1768) (1768–1849), English actor
- Charles Holland (cyclist) (1908–1989), English road bicycle racer
- Charles Holland (physician) (1802–1876), English doctor
- Charles Holland (singer) (1909–1987), American tenor singer and actor
- Charles A. Holland (1872–1940), American local politician in Los Angeles
- Charles Hepworth Holland (born 1923), British geologist
- Charles R. Holland (born 1946), former commander at United States Special Operations Command
- Charles Thurstan Holland (1863–1941), general practitioner in Liverpool
