= Charles Swainson of Preston =

English businessman (1780–1866)

Charles Swainson
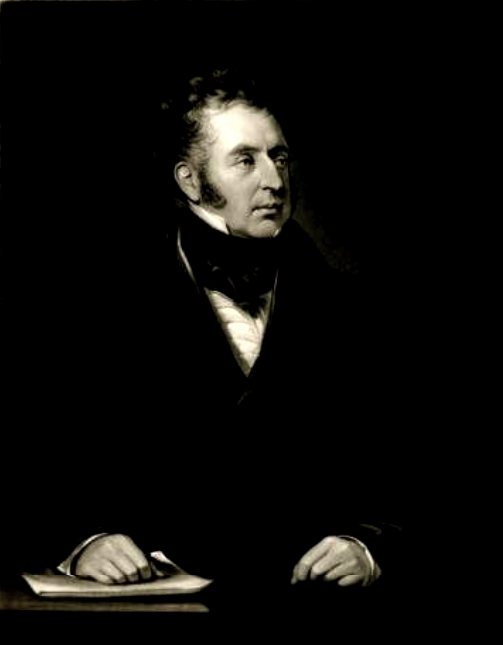
- Charles Swainson, 1842 engraving
- Born: 1780; Preston, Lancashire, England
- Died: 1866 (aged 85–86)
- Occupation(s): Calico printer, businessman
- Spouse: Catherine Warbreck née Bradshaw
- Children: 5

Charles Swainson (1780–1866) was an English businessman, a calico printer in Preston, Lancashire.

== Background ==
Charles Swainson was a second-generation Tory cotton lord in Preston, son of a calico manufacturer. Based on monumental inscriptions in the church of St Michael's on Wyre, he was one of at least 10 children of John Swainson (1765/6–1800) and his wife Susannah Inman, (1749/50–1722), daughter of Charles Inman (1725–1767) of Lancaster and Jamaica, a slave-trader and his first wife Susannah Casson.

His paternal grandparents were the Rev. Christopher Swainson (died 1775) who had Lancashire livings at Goosnargh, Staveley and Copp, and his wife Elizabeth Lister (died 1788). His elder brother Christopher Swainson (died 1854) was an Oxford graduate and cleric.

His brother John Swainson (died 1867) owned mills in Leeming Street that passed to Edward Swainson, with businesses in Ireland. He moved away from Preston around 1840, and resided at Halton Hall. He married into the Tatham family of Hipping Hall.

His sister Mary Swainson (1778/9–1819) married William Birley of Kirkham. He went into partnership with Charles Swainson at the Preston mill.

== Business career ==
Charles Swainson became head of Swainson, Birley & Co. It ran a large mill in the Fishwick area of Preston, known locally as the "Big Factory".

Swainson had a residence at Cooper Hill in Walton-le-Dale, on the outskirts of Preston. Between 1809 and 1825 Swainson and his various partners owned the Bannister Hall textile printing works, in Walton-le-Dale; one of the original partners was Joseph Baxendale, a cousin who left and made a fortune with Pickfords. From 1825 to 1856 the printing works was known as Charles Swainson & Co.

In 1845 Swainson was chairman of the Preston and Longridge Railway.

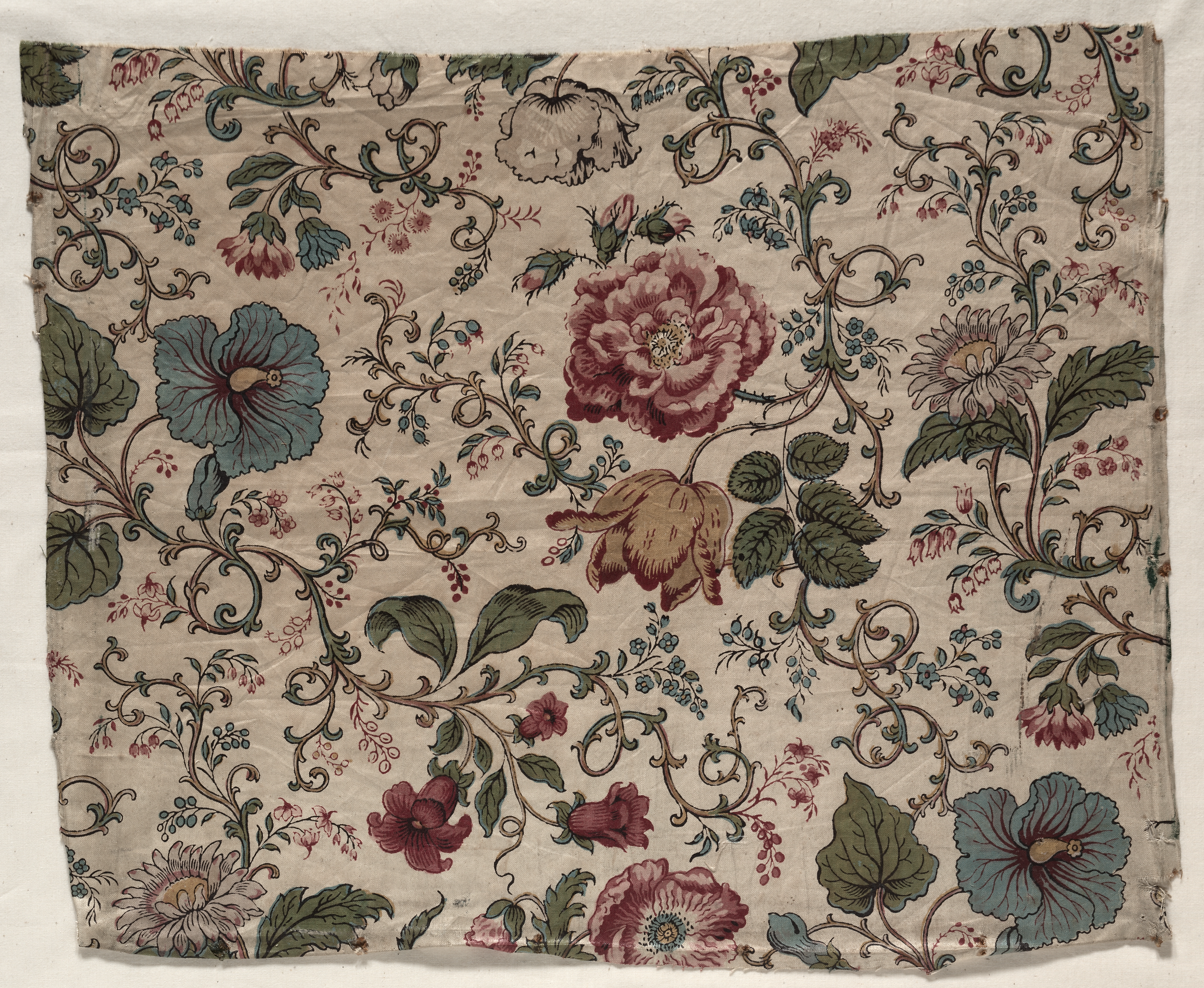
Bannister Hall chintz, 1833

Swainson & Dennys of 97 New Bond Street was the London outlet of the calico business. In the catalogue of the Great Exhibition 1851 they offered "Chintzes for dining rooms, libraries, &c."

== In politics ==
Swainson declined to stand for parliament in the Preston constituency in 1820. He spoke in 1830 at a borough meeting against the East India Company’s monopoly, and declined to stand for parliament, once more, for the 1831 general election. In that election, the sitting radical MP Henry Hunt held his Preston seat. Some months later, in November 1831, the mill of Swainson, Birley & Co. was attacked by some of Hunt's supporters. Part of the counting house was destroyed, and the crowd went on to threaten the jail, where they faced cannon. Swainson argued subsequently that cavalry should be stationed in Preston to protect property.

After the passing of the Municipal Corporations Act 1835, Charles Swainson was elected an alderman of Preston, and John Swainson a councillor. In 1841, Swainson accepted a nomination to stand for Preston in the general election, with the sitting Tory MP Robert Townley Parker. Both were defeated, Swainson coming bottom of the poll.

== John Clay and Joseph Livesey ==
Swainson was a patron of the penal reformer John Clay. There was a family link: Clay's sister Jane married in 1817 Charles Inman (1797–1858), who was Swainson's cousin. At age 21 and out of work, Clay came on a visit to Cooper Hill, around 1817. He became a long-term guest. Swainson persuaded Clay to study for the priesthood, and he was tutored by Robert Harris of Preston Grammar School. After his father's death in 1821, Clay was offered a position as assistant chaplain at the Preston House of Correction. His ordination as deacon at Kendal a few weeks later by George Henry Law, an advocate of graduate clerics, was facilitated by influential support. Clay was ordained priest in 1822.

The pioneer temperance advocate Joseph Livesey was brought up in Walton-le-Dale, moving to Preston to set up a business in 1817 when he had reached the age of majority. Swainson supported some of Livesey's initial temperance meetings of the early 1830s, taking the chair. Clay too supported temperance. He stopped short of advocating teetotalism and pledges to it: he saw a need for a more integrated reforming strategy.

== Family ==
Charles Swainson married Catherine Warbreck née Bradshaw. Their children included:

- Charles Swainson the younger, of Frenchwood House, father of Charles William Swainson.
- John Swainson, second son (died 1853) was a cleric, and married Mary Stables, daughter of Walter William Stables of Crosland Hall, Meltham, a Huddersfield merchant.
- Catherine, eldest daughter, married in 1831 J. Clayton of Ulster Place, London.
- Susanna, married in 1829 Ralph Ward Jackson.
- Frances Jane, youngest daughter, married in 1837 the Rev. Henry Walter M'Grath.
