= Thomas Inman =

English surgeon (1820–1876)

Thomas Inman (27 January 1820 – 3 May 1876) was a house-surgeon to the Liverpool Royal Infirmary. In his lifetime he had numerous medical papers published. He was also an amateur mythologist, and wrote Ancient Pagan and Modern Christian Symbolism, first published in 1869 and then again in 1875. In it he elucidated the origins of common symbols, some of them medical. Many of the symbols he discusses are in use today.

== Life ==
Born on 27 January 1820 in Rutland Street, Leicester, he was second son of Charles Inman, a partner in Pickfords carrying company, and later director of the Bank of Liverpool; William Inman was his younger brother. Thomas went to school at Wakefield, and in 1836 was apprenticed to his uncle, Richard Inman, M.D., at Preston, Lancashire. He entered King's College, London, where he graduated M.B. in 1842 and M.D. in 1844 at the University of London.

Declining a commission as an army surgeon, Inman settled in Liverpool as house-surgeon to the Royal Infirmary. He obtained a good practice as a physician, and was for many years physician to the Royal Infirmary.

In 1871 he gave up practice and retired to Clifton, near Bristol, where he died on 3 May 1876. He was a man of handsome presence, and his genial temperament made him generally popular.

== Works ==
Inman's publications on personal hygiene are practical advice. On 21 October 1844 he became a member of the Literary and Philosophical Society of Liverpool, to whose Proceedings he contributed papers, mainly on archæological subjects. He read widely, was no scholar, but wrote with ingenuity. From Godfrey Higgins he derived the suggestion that the key to all mythology is to be sought in phallic worship. On 5 February 1866 he first propounded this theory in a paper on The Antiquity of certain Christian and other Names. The subject was pursued in other papers, and in three works on Ancient Faiths, which he published between 1868 and 1876.

His major works are:

- Spontaneous Combustion, Liverpool, 1855.
- On certain Painful Muscular Affections, 1856; 2nd edition, with title, The Phenomena of Spinal Irritation and Other Functional Diseases. John Churchill, London 1858 online; 3rd edition, with title, On Myalgia, &c., 1860.
- The Foundation for a new Theory and Practice of Medicine, 1860; 2nd edition, 1861.–
- On the Preservation of Health, &c., Liverpool, 1868; 2nd edition, 1870; 3rd edition, 1872.
- Ancient Faiths embodied in Ancient Names; or, an Attempt to trace the Religious Belief … of certain Nations, &c., vol. i. 1868; vol. ii. 1869; 2nd edition, 1872–3. It was revised by Thomas Scott.
- Ancient Pagan and Modern Christian Symbolism exposed and explained, &c., 1869.
- The Restoration of Health, &c., 1870; 2nd edition, 1872.
- Ancient Faiths and Modern: a Dissertation upon Worships … before the Christian Era, &c., New York (printed at Edinburgh), 1876.

== Family ==
Inman married in 1844 Jennet Leighton, daughter of Daniel Newham of Douglas, Isle of Man, and had six sons and two daughters, of whom two sons and two daughters survived him.
