= St Andrew's Church, Ashton-on-Ribble =

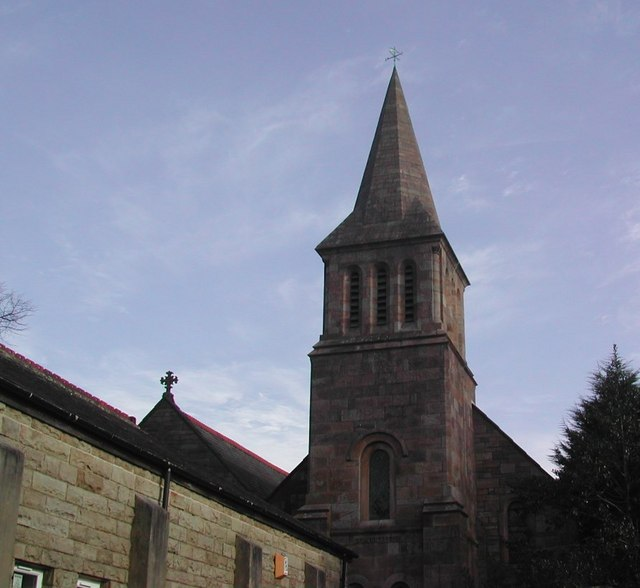
- Steeple of St Andrew's

- Location in Preston
- 53.7689°N 2.7360°W
- OS grid reference: SD 516 305
- Location: Blackpool Road, Ashton-on-Ribble, Preston, Lancashire
- Country: England
- Denomination: Anglican
- Churchmanship: Conservative Evangelical
- Website: www.standrewsashton.org.uk

History
- Status: Parish church
- Dedication: Saint Andrew

Architecture
- Functional status: Active
- Heritage designation: Grade II
- Designated: 27 September 1979
- Architect: Ewan Christian (expansion)
- Architectural type: Church
- Style: Romanesque Revival, Gothic Revival
- Groundbreaking: 1835 construction start: 1836
- Completed: 1902

Specifications
- Materials: Sandstone, slate roofs

Administration
- Province: York
- Diocese: Blackburn
- Archdeaconry: Lancaster
- Deanery: Preston
- Parish: St Andrew, Ashton-on-Ribble

St Andrew's Church is in Blackpool Road, Ashton-on-Ribble, Preston, Lancashire, England. It is an active Anglican parish church in the deanery of Preston, the archdeaconry of Lancaster, and the diocese of Blackburn. The Church is recorded in the National Heritage List for England as a designated Grade II listed building, and is the burial site of Edmund Robert Harris (c.1804 - 1877), the principal benefactor of a range of local institutions, from the Harris Museum to the Harris Technical School (now known as the University of Lancashire). He is buried in a triple coffin in the Church vault.

== History ==
The foundation stone of the church was laid on 20 August 1835, and the church was built in the 1836 consecrated on 7 October 1836 by the Rt Revd John Bird Sumner, bishop of Chester. At this time the church seated about 300 people. In 1873–74 the architect Ewan Christian added a north aisle and converted the nave windows into Early English style. A vestry was added in 1902.

=== Present day ===
St Andrew's Church is within the Conservative Evangelical tradition of the Church of England and it receives alternative episcopal oversight from the Bishop of Ebbsfleet.

== Architecture ==
=== Exterior ===
The church is constructed in sandstone with slate roofs. Its plan consists of a four-bay nave, a wide north aisle, a north porch, a chancel with an organ chamber to the north, a vestry to the east, and a small west tower. The tower is in Romanesque style, and the rest of the church is in Early English style. The tower is in three stages, with buttresses, and a short broach spire. In the bottom stage are two round-headed lancet windows, with a similar but larger window in the middle stage. The bell openings are louvred, and consist of triple round-headed lancets. Along the sides of the nave and the aisle are three two-light windows, and a three-light window in the eastern bay.

=== Interior ===
Inside the church, the arcade is carried on cylindrical piers of polished pink granite. In the chancel is a sedilia. On the wall of the church are monuments to members of the Pedder family. The stained glass in the east window is by Hardman. The three-manual organ was built in 1902 by Henry Willis & Sons. It was overhauled in 1969 by J. W. Walker, and again in 2001 by Wood of Huddersfield.

== External features ==
The churchyard contains the war graves of a Royal Air Force officer of World War I, and an Army Dental Corps officer and Royal Army Medical Corps sergeant of World War II.

== See also ==
- Listed buildings in Preston, Lancashire
