= Hipping Hall =

Country house hotel

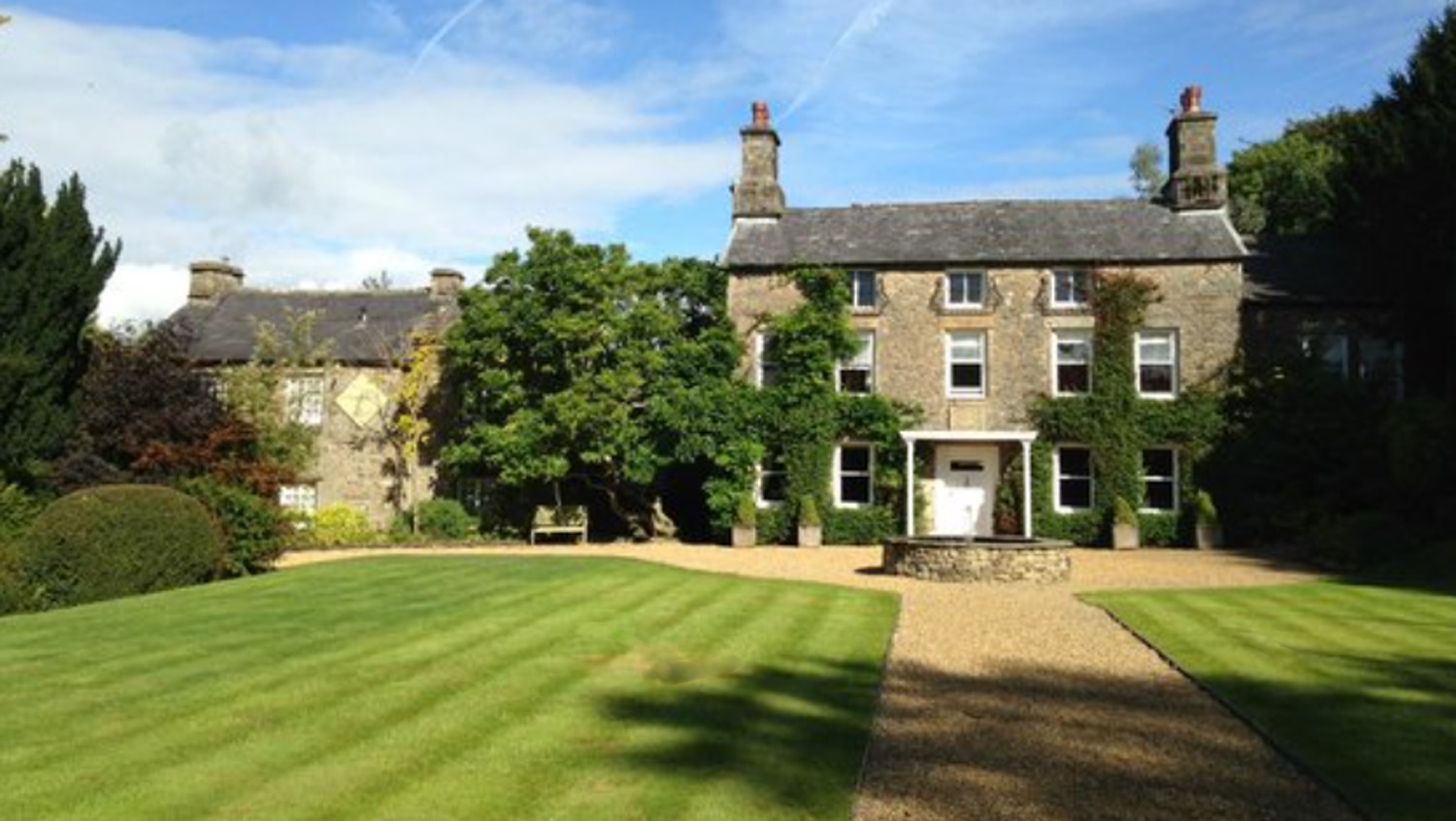
- Interactive map of Hipping Hall

Restaurant information
- Established: 2005
- Rating: (Five stars); AA Rosettes
- Location: Cowan Bridge, Cumbria, England
- Coordinates: 54.1767°N 2.5480°W
- Website: http://www.hippinghall.com/

Hipping Hall was a country house hotel on the border of Lancashire, Cumbria and North Yorkshire, near Kirkby Lonsdale.

In 2005, chemist-turned-hotelier Andrew Wildsmith, opened a five-star retreat with nine bedrooms and a Four-AA Rosette restaurant serving a menu of locally sourced food.

In Autumn 2010, Hipping Hall featured in an episode of BBC2’s The Trip – a series starring Steve Coogan and Rob Brydon, in which the pair embark on a restaurant tour of northern England.

On the 24th July 2023, the hotel and restaurant closed.

== History ==
The house was originally the family home of the Tathams – a family of blacksmiths who catered for all those travelling on the old packhorse route from Yorkshire to Cumbria via Cowan Bridge. One of Hipping's main features is The Great Hall, now the dining room, which dates from the 15th century and is a balconied, beamed space. From there is a view of a 13th-century wash house complete with Gothic arch.

Hipping Hall is surrounded on four sides by the magnificent landscapes of the Lune Valley, Lake District, Yorkshire Dales, and the Trough of Bowland.

== The Tatham family ==
Robert Tatham (1634–1692) bought “the dwelling house called Hipping Hall” from William Gibson in 1668 and built the current Hall. The previous building dated back to the 15th century and some the rooms were incorporated into the new Hall. Some years later in 1677 he added a sundial to the house with his wife Ann which can still be seen today.

Robert Tatham was the third son of Edward Tatham of Over Leck. He was a blacksmith and his new home on a well-frequented road would have brought him many customers needing shoeing for their horses and repairs to their carriages. He prospered and in the succeeding years he bought more land surrounding his original purchase.

He died in 1692 and his son Edward Tatham (1673–1747) inherited the property. In 1704 he married Mary Mawson who with her husband decided to re-edify the Hall by putting their initials with the date 1706 above the front door. She died in 1715 and ten years later he married Elizabeth Taylor. He died in 1747 and his eldest son Edward Tatham (1727–1773) inherited the property.

It was this Edward Tatham who advanced the fortunes of the family. As a young man he made his own way in the world. At the age of 20, shortly before his father died, he bought a house and land at Nether Leck. He became a lawyer and in 1755 married a wealthy heiress, Mary Trotter, who was the daughter of Richard Trotter of High Hall. The couple had eight children. He died in 1773, while Mary lived for another fifty years and died at the age of 96.

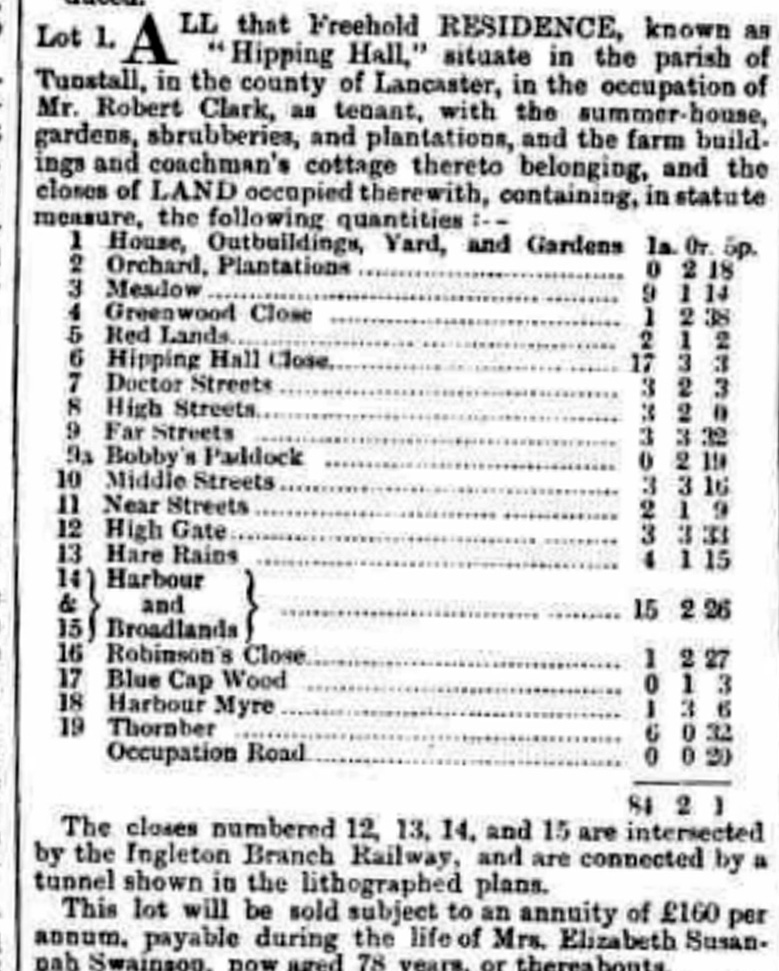
Advertisement for the sale of Hipping Hall in 1868

Edward Tatham (1763-1842) her eldest son was the next owner of the Hall. He married in 1786 Susanna Gibson and had three children. She died in 1819 and in the following year he married Elizabeth Preston but they had no more children. The 1841 Census records him and Elizabeth living at Hipping Hall with four servants. In 1840 his younger brother Richard died and left him Summerfield House which was near Kirkby Lonsdale. This house then came into the Tatham family of Hipping Hall and both properties were passed down through the generations.

Edward’s eldest son by his first marriage was Edward Tatham (1787–1863). He died unmarried in 1863 and left the property to his nephew John Swainson, a manufacturer. He sold the property in 1868.

== The Wearing family ==
The Hall was bought in 1868 by Richard Wearing (1824-1890) who was described as “a gentleman”. He was born in 1824. In 1865 he married Agnes Hyde Parkes the daughter of Rowland Parke of Leck Villa. The Couple had two sons. When St Peter’s Church in Leck was rebuilt in 1879 Richard presented three bells to the Church. Then in 1889 when his eldest son Richard Rowland Parke Wearing came of age two more bells were given to the Church.

When Richard died in 1890 his eldest son inherited the Hall. He became a lawyer. He did not marry and when he died 1927 the house was passed to his brother William Thomas Wearing, a retired medical practitioner.
