= Thomas Scott (publisher) =

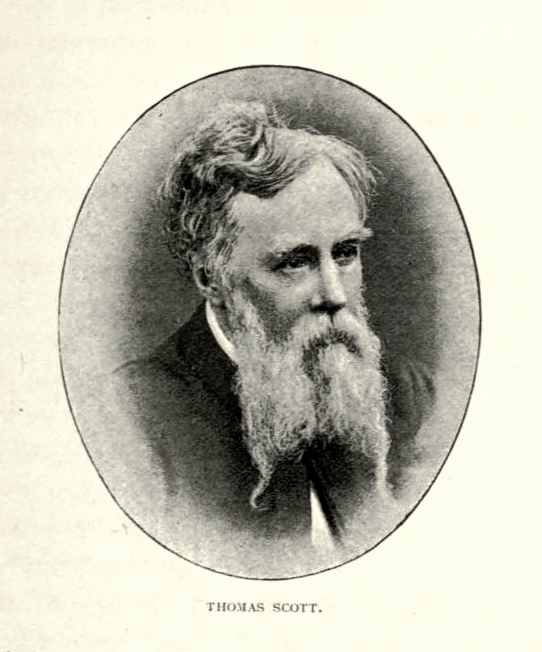
- Portrait of Thomas Scott in later life
- Born: 1808
- Died: 1878 (aged 69–70)
- Occupation: publisher

Thomas Scott (1808–1878) was an English small press publisher and freethinker. He is known for a series of books and pamphlets published in the 1860s and 1870s on topics around religion.

== Life ==
Born on 28 April 1808, Scott was brought up in France as a Roman Catholic. He attended the court of Charles X of France. Independently wealthy, he travelled widely, and spent some time with Native Americans.

Around 1856 Scott grew dissatisfied with Christian beliefs. In 1862 he started issuing tracts advocating "free enquiry and the free expression of opinion". These were printed at his own expense, and given away mostly to the clergy and intellectuals.

Scott made his house a salon for freethinkers. Supporting Charles Voysey, deprived of his living in 1871 and subsequently preaching at St. George's Hall, London, he set up a theistic church in 1870, and moved to Upper Norwood to be near it. Through Voysey, Annie Besant met Scott and his wife in 1872, and encountered the salon. When she separated from her husband in 1873, the Scotts found her a small house in Colby Road, Upper Norwood.

Thomas Scott died at Upper Norwood on 30 December 1878. His wife survived him.

== Publishing ==
Between 1862 and 1877 Scott issued, firstly from Ramsgate, and later from Norwood, over 200 titles, as pamphlets and books. He also reprinted such works such as Jeremy Bentham's Church of England Catechism Examined and David Hume's Dialogues on Natural Religion.

Among the writers who contributed to the series were Francis Newman, William Rathbone Greg, Robert Willis, Samuel Hinds, Charles Voysey, Moncure D. Conway, Richard Davies Hanson, Marcus Kalisch, John Muir, John Addington Symonds, Thomas Lumisden Strange, Edward Maitland, Edward Vansittart Neale, Charles Bray, George Gustavus Zerffi, and Robert Rodolph Suffield.

The series was ultimately collected in 16 volumes. Scott's contributions to it were not major, but he was an active editor.

Scott also saw through the press John Colenso's works on the Pentateuch and Book of Joshua while the latter was out of the country. He revised Ancient Faiths embodied in Ancient Names, by Thomas Inman.

== Works ==
Scott put his name on The English Life of Jesus, 1872, a work thought to have been written in part by George William Cox. He also wrote:

- An Address to the Friends of Free Enquiry and Expression, 1865
- Questions, to which Answers are respectfully asked from the Orthodox, 1866
- A Letter to H. Alford, Dean of Canterbury, 1869
- A Challenge to the Members of the Christian Evidence Society, 1871
- The Tactics and Defeat of the Christian Evidence Society, 1871
- The Dean of Ripon on the Physical Resurrection, 1872
- A Farewell Address, 1877, in which he stated that "the only true orthodoxy is loyalty to reason, and the only infidelity which merits censure is disloyalty to reason."
