= Joseph Baxendale =

British businessman (1785–1872)

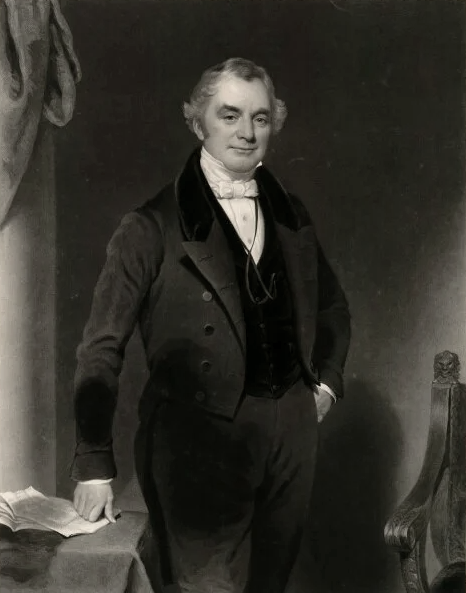
- Joseph Baxendale, 1848 portrait engraving after Henry William Pickersgill
- Born: 1785
- Died: 1872 (aged 86–87)
- Occupation: Businessperson

Joseph Baxendale (1785–1872) was an English entrepreneur, known for rebuilding and expanding the Pickfords carrier company in the middle of the 19th century.

== Early life and background ==
He was born in Lancaster, the elder son of Josiah Baxendale, a surgeon there, and his wife Mabella Salisbury, daughter of Thomas Salisbury of Settle, North Yorkshire. Having worked in Preston, Lancashire and for a linen draper in London, in 1809 he went into business with Charles Swainson of Preston, a textile magnate.

Turnbull in his history of Pickfords traces the family relationships of the three new partners of 1817: Baxendale, Charles Inman and Zachary Langton. He comments on the significance of a close-knit group of families from Kirkham, in the lowland Lancashire area of The Fylde south of Lancaster and west of Preston: the Birleys, Hornbys and Langtons. The links were not just familial, but also a source of capital. Baxendale married into the Birleys. Charles Swainson was in partnership at the Preston cotton mill, distinct from the Bannister Hall calico printing works that Baxendale joined, with William Birley of Kirkham. The Oxford Dictionary of National Biography points out that Baxendale was also directly related to Swainson, through the Salisbury family. In fact his mother Mabella, through her grandmother Mary Lister née Swainson, was a second cousin of John Swainson (died 1800), Charles Swainson's father.

Baxendale's London placement in 1806 was with the wholesaler Samuel Croughton, of St Paul's Churchyard, a distributor for Bannister Hall calico; and he was representing Swainson family interests there. He borrowed money to go in with Charles Swainson at Bannister Hall, taking a 20% stake. Half the capital was from his father, who charged him interest. He also borrowed from an uncle. He lived at Walton-le-Dale, and profited from his time with Swainson, leaving at the end of 1816.

== Pickfords ==
In April 1817, Baxendale bought a one-sixth share in Pickfords, financed largely from his wife's family money. A letter of March of that year, from James Pickford to Matthew Pickford II, mentions the broker negotiating the deal as "Mr Birley", tentatively identified by Turnbull as Hugh Hornby Birley, Baxendale's brother-in-law. The other incoming partners, Inman and Langton, took matching shares, so 50% remained with the Pickford family owners. The financial position of the business was very poor, and complicated. In 1819 the share position was adjusted, the owners becoming five with equal shares, and so the control passing to the new partners.

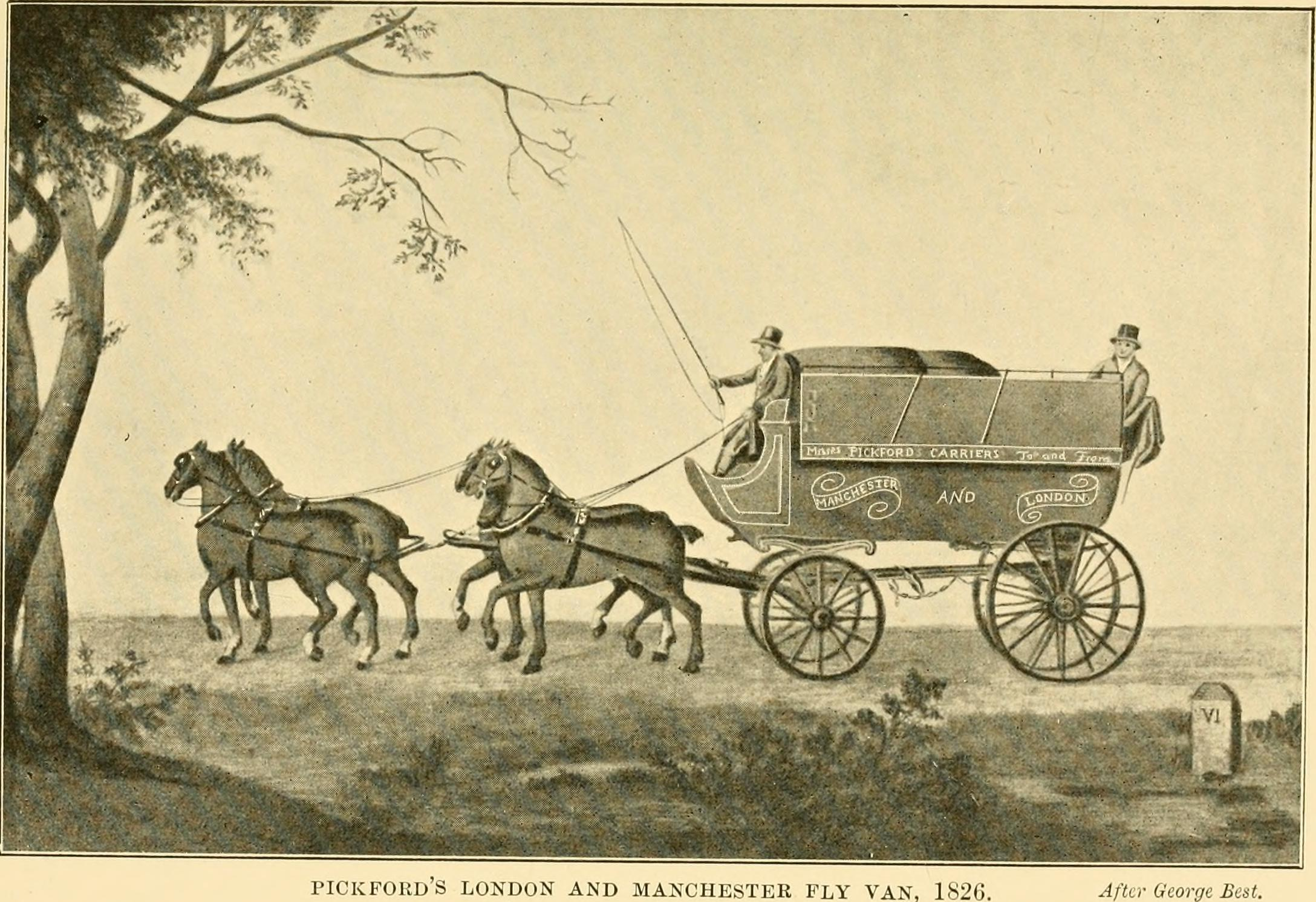
Pickfords caravan or fly-van, "sprung and guarded", 1826 engraving

Pickfords at this time was based in Manchester, and from 1814 began to use "sprung and guarded" caravans (fly-vans) for road transport, modelled on the stagecoach. Matthew Pickford I (1741–1799) had made canal transport the major component of the Pickfords carrying trade. In Manchester, the canal terminus was Castle Quay.

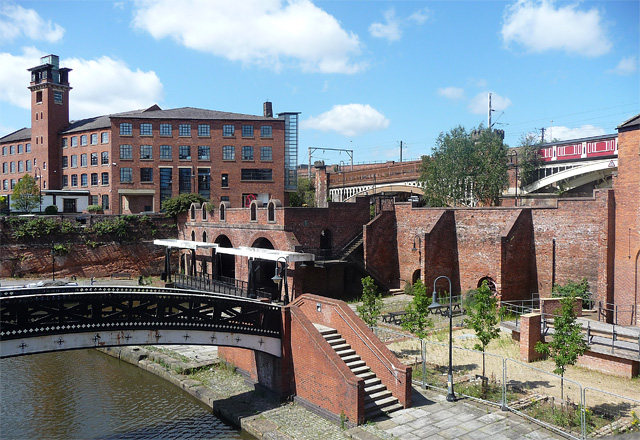
Castle Quay, Manchester, 2011 photograph

After management of Pickfords moved from Manchester to London in 1823, Baxendale settled at Woodside, Whetstone. By 1829 he was putting the company in position to adopt rail transport.

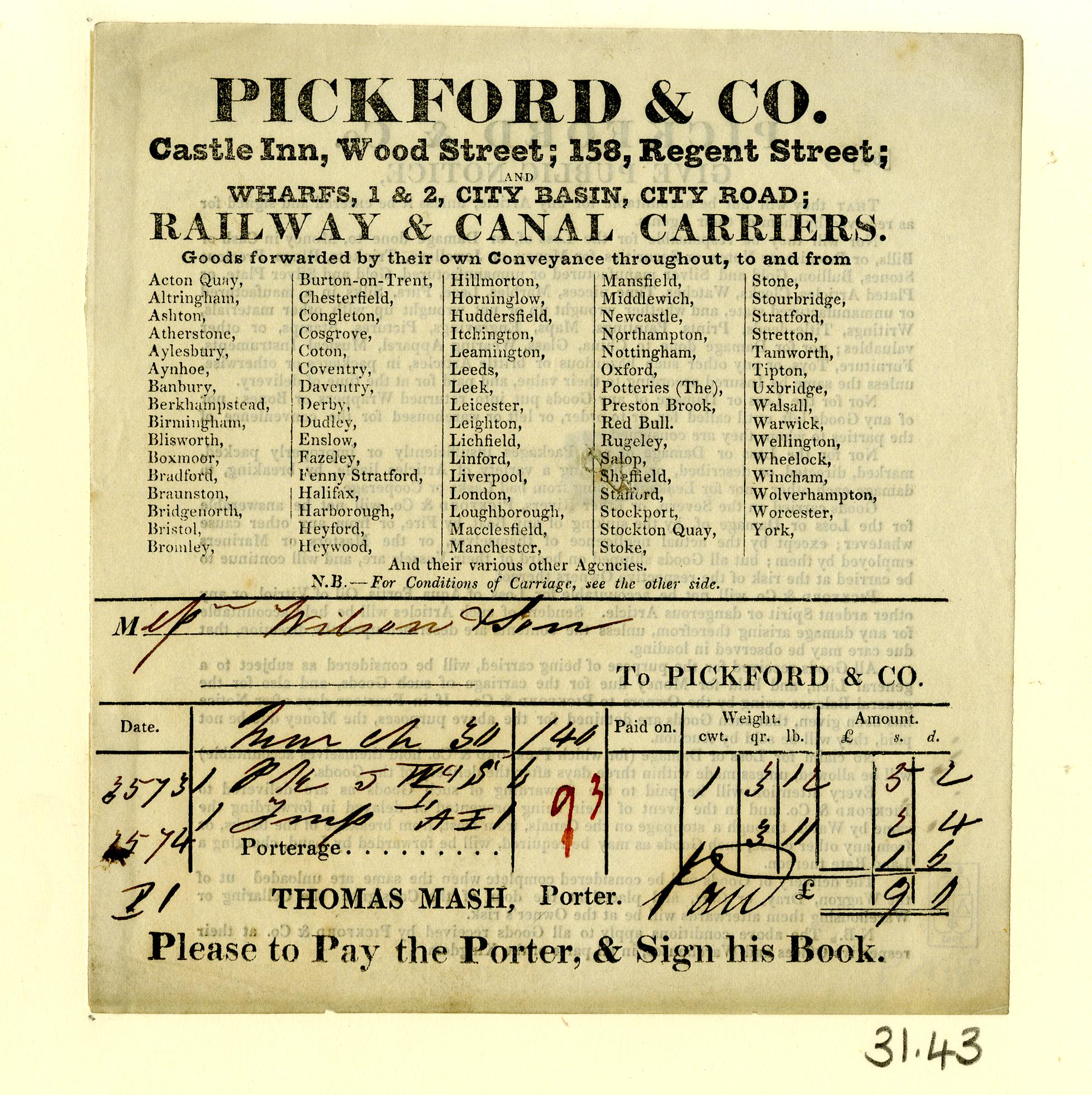
Pickford & Co. trade card, c.1830

Gradually Baxendale took personal control of the company. Matthew Pickford III retired in 1823; Thomas Pickford II died in 1846. In 1838 Inman and Langton left. John Hornby and Lloyd Baxendale, the two eldest sons, became partners in 1843. By 1828 the business had picked up after a slump, though reorganisation of its debt had taken a heavy toll on the Pickfords and their creditors, and the new partners had suffered repeated cash calls. There had been administrative havoc found in Birmingham, and some fraud. Baxendale standardised paperwork and simplified administration.

== Railway director ==
In 1837 Baxendale became a director of the South Eastern Railway, and he was its chairman from 1841 to 1845. He told a parliamentary committee chaired by W. E. Gladstone in 1844 that he held shares in many other railway companies.

By act of parliament, from 1836/7 the South Eastern Railway was active in building a rail link to Dover, to join the existing London and Croydon Railway at Reigate and form a London–Dover line. The strategic aim was to connect to Paris, via Folkestone and Boulogne. In 1843 Baxendale bought out the financially weak Folkestone Harbour Company, with William Parry Richards, another South Eastern Railway director, and Lewis Cubitt. The harbour was then developed by Baxendale and William Cubitt. In the end, two English Channel sea crossings were supported by the line: Folkestone–Boulogne and Dover–Calais.

== Later life ==
After illness in the mid-1840s and convalescence abroad, Baxendale withdrew from his business affairs, despite concerns about his sons' commitment at Pickfords. He had a lease on a block of properties in the Park Village West development of John Nash at Regent's Park, including no. 8, and No. 16 that he used as his residence in central London. He died at Woodside, Whetstone on 24 March 1872. He had built St John's Church, Whetstone on his property there, and was interred in its vault. He left Woodside House, built 1840, and its grounds, to a retirement home.

== Family ==
Baxendale married in 1816 Mary Birley, daughter of the mill owner Richard Birley (1743–1812) of Blackburn. They had four sons and three daughters. Of their children:

- John Hornby Baxendale married Mary Brockedon, daughter of William Brockedon.
- Lloyd Baxendale married Ellen Turner, and was father of Lloyd Henry Baxendale (Harry) who went into Pickfords.
- Richard Birley Baxendale married Caroline Anne Darroch, daughter of Duncan Darroch.
- Salisbury Baxendale, fourth son, married 1856 Edith Marian Jones, daughter of Harry David Jones RE.
- Alice, eldest daughter (died 1851), married in 1849 Charles Holland MD, FRS, as his second wife.
- Mabella, married Hugh Birley, Member of Parliament for Manchester, in 1842.

Their remaining daughter Jane Birley Baxendale married Robert Jackson Butler, M.A. (Oxon), the son of the late William Henry Butler, wine merchant of Oxford who had served as Mayor, in Whetstone on 18 October 1870.
