= Edmund Robert Harris =

British lawyer

Edmund Harris
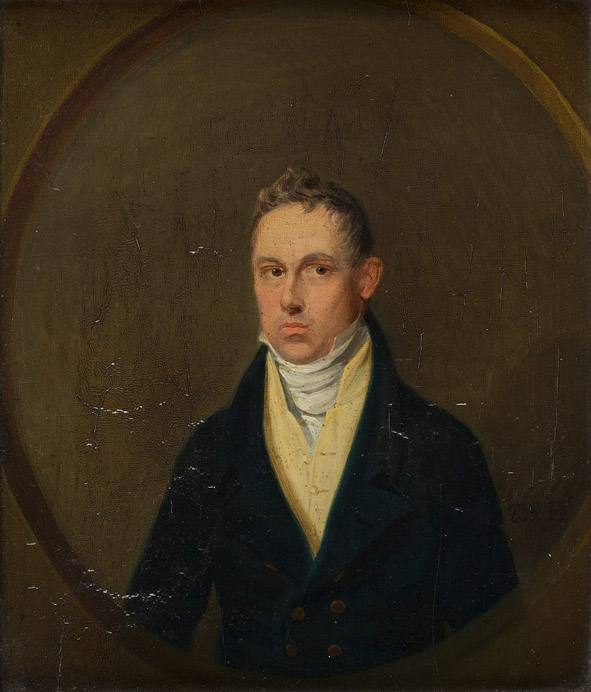
- Portrait of Edmund Harris
- Born: Edmund Robert Harris
- Died: 27 May 1877 Preston, Lancashire, England

Edmund Robert Harris (c. 1804 – 27 May 1877) was a British lawyer from Preston, Lancashire who was the principal benefactor of the Harris Museum, Harris Institute or Art School, Harris Technical School (which became what is now the University of Lancashire), and the Harris Orphanage.

Harris was the son of the Reverend Robert Harris (1764–1862) vicar of St George's Parish Church (now known as the Church of St George the Martyr), in Preston, and headmaster of the Preston Grammar School. The Reverend Harris was also the librarian of the Dr. Richard Shepherd Library and had been involved in a long campaign for the creation of a free public library and museum in Preston.

Harris died aged 73 at his home at Whinfield House in Ashton-on-Ribble, a suburb in the West of Preston, on 27 May 1877, and was buried in a triple coffin in a vault in St Andrew's Church, Ashton-on-Ribble.

After the death of his father in 1862 and his brother Thomas in 1875, Edmund Harris inherited the family's entire wealth and had no heirs. He left instructions in his will and £300,000 to create a trust that would help support several new institutions in Preston, including a free public library, museum and art gallery. They were all dedicated in memory of his family and in particular his father the Reverend Robert Harris.

The Harris Museum is the only institution created by the Harris bequest that still exists in its original form. The Harris Institute and Harris Technical School became the University of Central Lancashire and the university still has the Harris technical school building on Corporation Street as part of its campus. The Harris Institute building on Avenham Lane and Harris Orphanage buildings on Garstang Road are now in private ownership.

The Harris Free Public Library and Museum Endowment Trust still exists to support the work of the Harris Museum and the library.
