= Halton Hall =

English country house in Halton, Lancashire, England

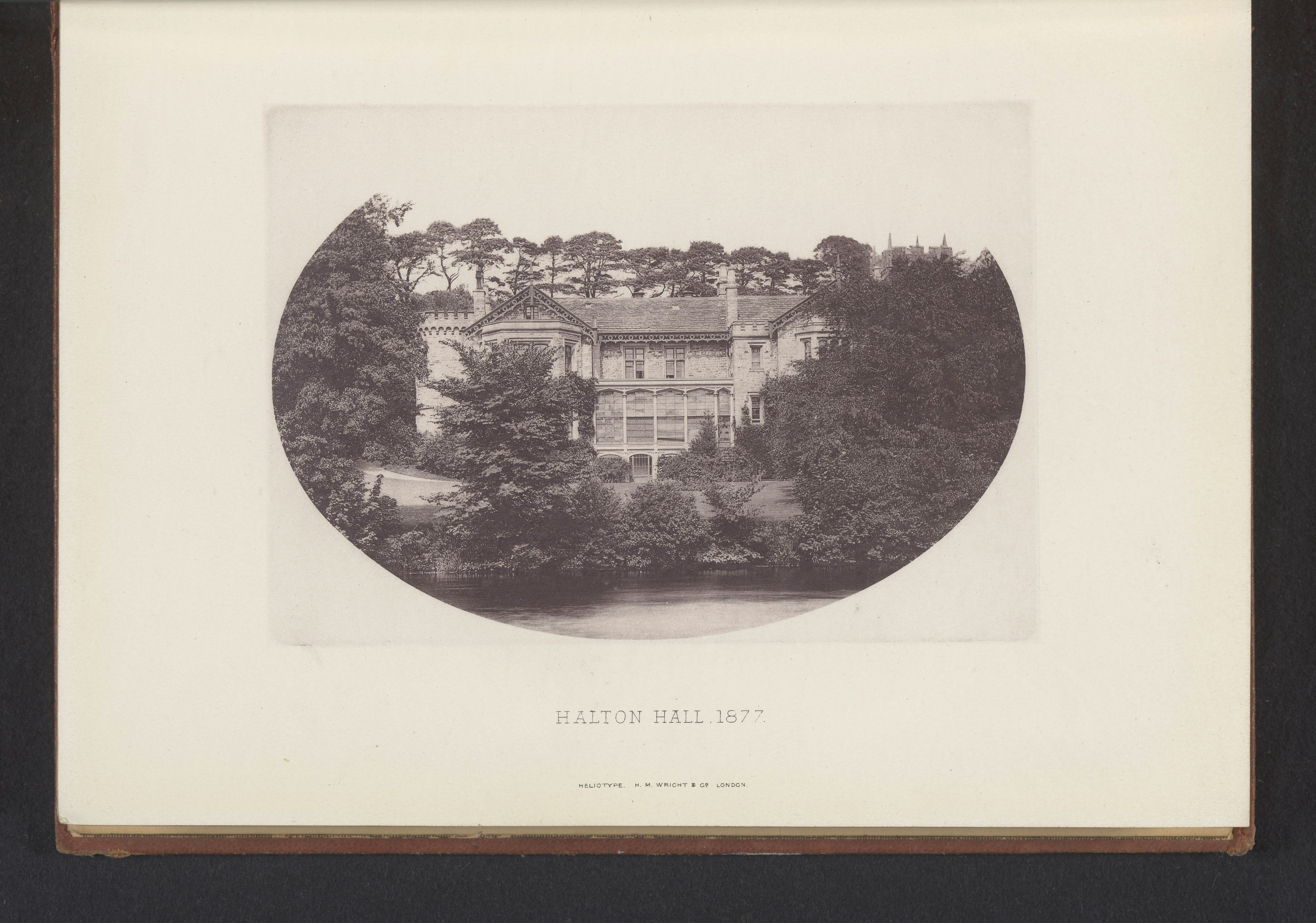
Halton Hall in 1877

Halton Hall was an English country house that stood in the grounds of the Halton Hall Estates and Manor for several centuries on the "right bank of the River Lune to the south of the church" in Halton, Lancashire.

== History ==
Halton was an important settlement before the Norman Conquest. A manor-house was burnt down in 1322 by the invading Scots. A member of the Carus family was one of a group who purchased the manor in November 1583. Thereafter, the Carus family "made it their residence. They seem to have obtained the old rectory-house and to have turned it into their dwelling-place". It is unclear whether this was the original, modern Halton Hall or when it was first built. Halton Hall was part of Halton Manor and was held by "Esquire [Thomas] Carus and his two sons, Thomas and Christopher until 1715 when the family joined the Jacobite rising of 1715. The Carus family were labelled "Papists" as they had joined the rebels. With the failure of the rebellion, many properties were confiscated by the Forfeited Estates Commission and subsequently sold. Among them were Halton Hall, which then left the family. The building was modified substantially, especially during the last decade of the nineteenth century.

=== Ownership and occupancy ===
- A Thomas Carus was the last owner of the Carus family from whom the property was confiscated and subsequently sold
- William Bradshaw of Westminster
- William Bradshaw Fletcher (d. 1815), who changed his name to William Bradshaw Bradshaw
- William Fletcher Bradshaw, who lost his fortune
- John Swainson (b. 27 June 1784; d. 9 November 1867)
- Major Robert Whitle
- Edmund Sharpe (b. 29 November 1847 d.1925), cotton and oil cloth manufacturer, son of Edmund Sharpe, the architect.
- Demolished in the 1930s.
