= William Scott (South Australian politician) =

Australian politician

William Scott (1795 – 2 January 1866), often called "Captain Scott", was a vigneron, businessman and politician of Magill, South Australia.

== Life ==
Captain Scott and his family arrived in South Australia on the Canton from Liverpool in April 1838 and lived a quiet, unobtrusive life. Arriving with the Scotts were David Wylie M.A. (ca.1799 – 8 March 1853) and his wife Elizabeth, who opened a school at Tranmere and taught some of the Scott children.

Scott was granted Section 274 of 80 acres at Magill, which he named "Brookside", adjacent to "Tranmere", Section 273 of 67 acres which was granted to his brother-in-law David Wylie. He began farming but gave that up to act as an agent at Port Adelaide, which proved lucrative. He was appointed a "brother" of the Trinity House Board, later renamed the Marine Board.

Scott was elected to the South Australian Legislative Council unopposed for the Port Adelaide electorate in 1853, then for the single statewide province in 1857, 1860 and 1862 until resigning on 10 June 1863.

== Scotch Baptist ==
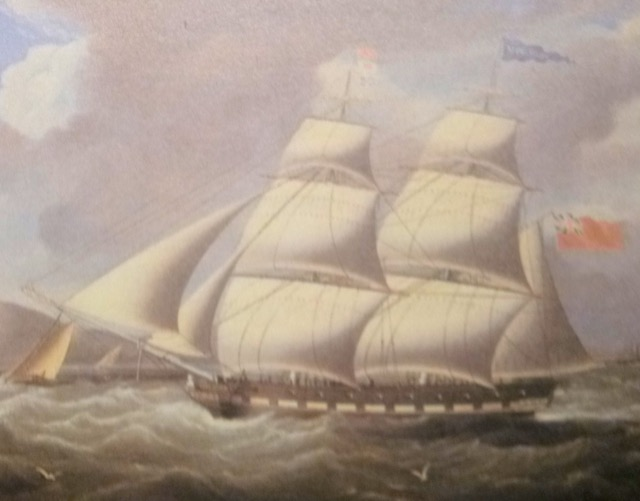
Brig Mary Scott

Scott was an elder and regular lay preacher of the Scotch Baptist Church. He was master of the brig Mary Scott in 1831, sailing from Liverpool to west coast ports in South America, for the ship brokers Aikin & Hughes. During the 1830s, at Callao, Peru, the Bethel flag was flying "at the mast-head of the Mary Scott, of Liverpool, commanded by Captain Scott." Scott was conducting a mission meeting on board. In 1841 the Mary Scott, Sadler captain, was wrecked and sank in the Irish Sea after a collision. At this point the brig was the property of the widowed Margaret Little; she was the daughter of David Stewart Wylie, and sister of David Wylie the younger.

Early in his time in the Adelaide area, Scott joined, and later led, a congregation that began with David McLaren. They initially met in the cottage of William Finlayson, on what became Rundle Street. The place was a "peasey hut". Philip Santo belonged to this group, and James Crabb Verco, baptised by Scott in the River Torrens. Scott was then working as a shipping agent in the port.

In the mid-1840s Scott belonged to a congregation which met in Hindley Street. It moved on to Franklin Street. Once a chapel was built there, Thomas Magarey was admitted. Previously he had been excluded, for doctrinal reasons, and the change, by majority vote, was against Scott's wishes. He opposed the principle of baptismal regeneration. In 1848, the congregation split, with Scott's group adhering to Calvinist principles, while the group around Magarey were influenced by the writings of Alexander Campbell.

Scott later belonged to the Magill Baptist Church, which was founded in Gladstone Avenue, Magill in 1858. He was a friend of the Congregationalist Thomas Quinton Stow.

== Family ==
Scott was married, perhaps to Mary.

- Eldest daughter Jane (Jean?) Margaret Scott ( – 26 September 1902) married Joseph Herbert Thornley (1829 – 9 January 1900), a prominent banker, in 1867.
- William David Scott (ca.1830 – 18 August 1891) was Master of the Supreme Court after a partnership with William Bakewell.
- David Wylie Scott (March 1833 – 2 December 1887) was editor of the Port Adelaide News and a farmer at Barossa and Belalie (near Jamestown). He married Margaret Cochrane Little (25 June 1825 – 17 May 1919), a noted flower painter, in 1861. He also lived at Mount Crawford and Alberton. He wrote a book biblically disproving geology as a science.
- Robert John Scott (ca.1835 – 5 August 1911) captain of the First Adelaide Rifles and vigneron of "Brookside", Magill, later of Largs Bay. In 1885 he was convicted of indecent conduct, but escaped punishment on the grounds of insanity, and was sent to the Parkside Asylum.
- Mary Wylie Scott (ca.1838 – 5 March 1906) married Luigi Holmann Savrini on 14 January 1884. Savrini was a noted bass singer.
- James Cochrane Scott (29 September 1839 – 23 September 1904) married Annie Vincent Burns, a granddaughter of Robert Burns. They lived at Largs
- Janet Jamieson Scott (ca.1841 – 12 September 1923) of "Brookside", Magill, died at Largs Bay.

Scott died at his home "Brookside", Magill and was buried in the West Terrace Cemetery. He was not related to other South Australian MLC's Abraham Scott and Henry Scott. The "Brookside" home was still in the hands of J. Scott, but the vineyard was owned by J. Taylor Holmes.
