= David Stewart Wylie =

Scottish minister (1771–1856)

Personal details
- Born: 1771
- Died: 1856 (aged 84–85)
- Denomination: (1) Burgher Seceder (2) Glasite Baptist

David Stewart Wylie (1771–1856) was a Scottish minister, from around 1800 leading a Baptist congregation in Liverpool.

== Early life ==
Wylie was born in Riccarton, Kilmarnock. He studied at the University of Glasgow, and then at the Secession Divinity Hall in Selkirk, under George Lawson. He was ordained in the Secession Church in 1793, and became minister at Bruntshiels (Bruntshields, Burntshields), where a church had been built in the hills above Kilbarchan, Renfrewshire. Its catchment area was affected by the growing new town of Johnstone being developed by George Houston, 4th Laird of Johnstone; and one part of the congregation had moved with the minister John Lindsay to Bridge of Johnstone around the end of 1791. Another part of the congregation had moved away to Lochwinnoch.

Under the influence of the Old Light Controversy of the 1790s, Wylie resigned in 1795 from the Secession Church, because of his views on church polity: his absence from a meeting in Saltcoats in February 1796 brought his concerns to light. He opposed the "swearing of the covenants", in the formulation used by Lawson, who favoured a more liberal approach to subscription. His Bruntshiels congregation joined the Original Burgher Synod, of Old Light views.

Wylie soon was involved with a congregation in Paisley; he was an elder at the church in Pen Lane, in 1797. It was an Independent church, initially formed in 1795, meeting in a malt-barn then building a church. Ross attributes its existence to a nucleus formed by the past influence of John Witherspoon at the Laigh Kirk, Paisley, and John Snodgrass at the High Church. By 1798, Wylie had moved on within Paisley, with some of the congregation, to Stone Street Scotch Baptist Church.

== In Liverpool ==
Around 1796, Archibald McLean came to Liverpool, seeking to set up a Baptist congregation. He was assisted by the follower John Richard Jones, from the Ramoth Chapel, Llanfrothen. From around 1800, it was being run in Lord Street by William Jones and Wylie. A foundation date for Wylie's church of 1798 was given in 1835. Jones gave an account in the terms that Wylie moved the Paisley Scotch Baptist church to Liverpool, increasing the original group. They leased a chapel that had been used by John Johnson.

As a "McLeanite" congregation, it would normally be described as Glasite or Scotch Baptist (Sandemanian). Jones and Wylie came to disagree on religious matters, and Jones was in London from 1810. He commented that James and Robert Haldane, influential on Wylie, had only a superficial understanding of the Baptist tradition. It happened at the same period when Dr. James Watt led a group away from the Glassford Street church in Glasgow: Wylie sided with Watt. In 1834 the congregation met in Hunter Street, while Wylie's address was Great George Street.

Wylie set up a school, in Roscoe Street, which he ran for about 40 years. Among his pupils was John Clay. A directory for 1824 shows academy entries for D. S. Wylie in Roscoe Street (central Liverpool, Hope School), and D. Wylie A.M. in Watmough Street (Everton). There were Baptists in Everton by the early 18th century. Entries in 1828 show David Stewart Wylie with an academy at 87 Duke Street, the Rev. David Wylie A.M. having a commercial and classical academy at Everton.

Wylie was President of Liverpool Library in 1828; the David Wylie who was secretary of the Philosophical Society of Liverpool may instead have been his son.

== Works ==
Christ and Antichrist Displayed by Wylie impressed William Jones, before they began working together. It was attacked in 1826 by John Fleming of Airdrie, in A Testimony for an Universal Church. This may be the 1797 book Essay on the Kingdom of Christ.

Wylie wrote a pamphlet Letters on the subject of Baptism (1810). It was in defence of the views on baptism of Henry Paice, a Particular Baptist at the Stanley Street Chapel, against an attack by John Stewart (died 1840) of the Scottish Secession Church, minister of the Gloucester Street and Mount Pleasant Chapels.

== Family ==
His son David Wylie ran a well-known early school in South Australia. Pupils there included Jefferson Stow and Randolph Isham Stow.

David Wylie the younger, the only son, graduated M.A. from Glasgow University in 1818. He married in 1837 Elizabeth Little, daughter of John Little of Stapleton. He arrived in South Australia in 1838, having journeyed from England on the Canton, with William Scott and his family. He purchased section 273 on Magill Road, in what is now Tranmere, one of the suburbs of Adelaide. He died at Alberton, South Australia on 8 August 1853. The Methodist missionary David Stewart Wylie (1841–1920) was his son.

Of the daughters: Janet, the eldest, married Francis Duerden (for Duerdon) and died in Bermuda in 1827.

Margaret Wylie, daughter, married in 1819 Edward Little, a draper of Carlisle. That year the partnership Heslop & Little, drapers and mercers in Carlisle, was dissolved. In 1829 Little was described as a Liverpool silk-mercer and linen-draper. By 1838 he was in partnership with Gustav Christian Schwabe in Liverpool in a firm of commission agents. He died in 1840, at Handstyle House, West Derby, age reported as 50. Another report, which gives his age as 53 (and address Knotty Ash), states he was lately a merchant of Church Street, Liverpool.

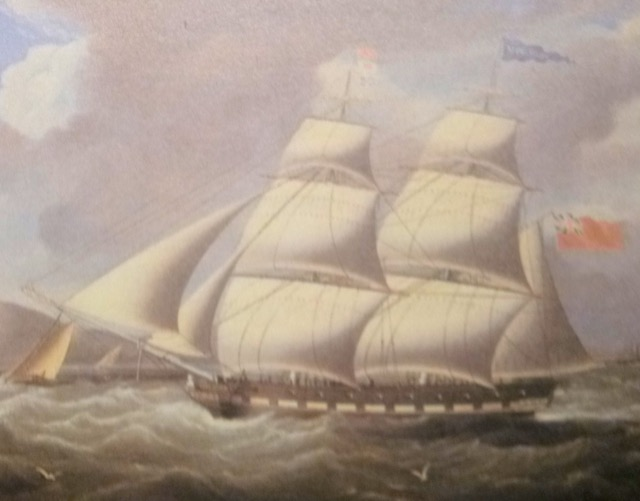
Brig Mary Scott

In 1841 the brig Mary Scott, the property of Margaret Little, was wrecked and sank in the Irish Sea in a collision, off the Point Lynas Lighthouse. The other ship involved was the Brooklyn of New York, Richardson captain. The master of the Mary Scott in 1831, sailing to Valparaíso and Lima, was William Scott. later during the 1830s, at Callao, Peru, the Bethel flag was flying "at the mast-head of the Mary Scott, of Liverpool, commanded by Captain Scott." Scott, a Baptist, conducted a mission meeting.
