= Robert Harris (priest) =

Robert Harris (1764–1862) was a nineteenth century Anglican priest and educator, most notable for his long running campaign to create a free public library and substantive museum in Preston, Lancashire.

Harris was born in Clitheroe on 20 February 1764; and was educated at the town's grammar school. He graduated B.A. from Sidney Sussex College, Cambridge in 1787; M.A. in 1790; and B.D. in 1797. He was Headmaster of Preston Grammar School from 1788 until 1835; and Vicar of Preston from 1798 until his death on 6 January 1862. His son completed his father's campaign.
