= Charles Holland (physician) =

British physician (1802–1876)

Charles Holland FRS MD (1802–1876) was a British physician. He was elected Fellow of the Royal Society in 1837.

== Staffordshire background ==
He was the only son of Joseph Holland of Rodbaston, near Penkridge, Staffordshire, and his wife Elizabeth Wells. He succeeded his father in 1803.

Rodbaston was an old manor, where the manor house of the 17th century was no longer extant in 1959, when it was mentioned in a Victoria County History. The existing Hall is from the 19th century. In 1831 Rodbaston Hall belonged to William Holland, with 180 acres (73 ha) of farmland. He died in 1849, at age 58, and debtors to the estate were asked to make payment to Charles Holland at Rodbaston Hall. In 1851 the Hall belonged to Charles Holland, who had sold it by 1852 to Thomas Shaw-Hellier.

Stowe House, Lichfield, which he later called St Chad's House, was bought by Charles Holland from the banker Richard Greene in 1856. Holland's address was given in 1860 as Lyncroft House, Lichfield; but also in 1859 as Stowe House.

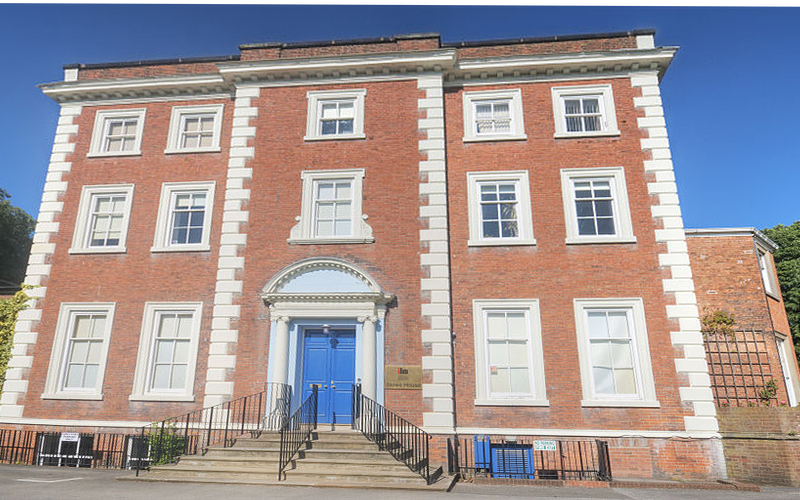
Stowe House, Lichfield, residence of Charles Holland in later life, 2011 photograph

Holland was one of the original trustees of the Gilchrist Educational Trust. His place was taken in 1865 by Richard Leigh Holland, the elder son of William Holland of Streethay. William Holland of Streethay (died 1839) was grandson of William Holland (died 1784) of Rodbaston Hall.

== Medical career ==
Holland studied at Edinburgh University, where he graduated MD in 1824. became physician to the Islington Dispensary, and a Member of the Royal College of Physicians, licensed to practise in 1828. His address was given by the Royal College of Physicians in 1845 as Queen Street, Mayfair, London.

== Family ==
Holland married, firstly in 1830, Anne Craufurd Paterson (died 1845), daughter of James Paterson MD of Ayr, and of Queen Street, Mayfair. He married secondly, in 1849, Alice Baxendale (died 1851), eldest daughter of Joseph Baxendale.
