= William Inman =

English steamship magnate (1825-1881)

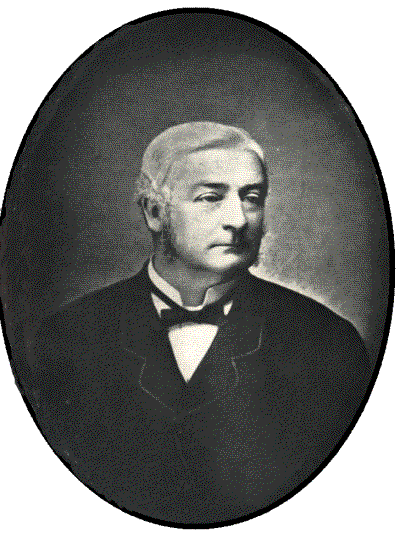
- William Inman (1825–1881)
- Born: 1825
- Died: 1881 (aged 55–56)
- Occupation: steamship magnate

William Inman (6 April 1825 in Leicester – 3 July 1881 in Upton, Wirral) was the owner of the Liverpool, New York and Philadelphia Steamship Company. Also known as the Inman Line, it ran services from Liverpool to New York and Philadelphia, in the United States, for emigration in the mid-19th century.

He was the fourth son of Charles Inman. He became the owner of Upton Manor, in the grounds of Upton Park and held the title Lord of the manor of Upton. A benefactor to his local community, Inman donated funds for the construction of Christchurch, Moreton and St. Mary's Church, Upton.

Inman married in 1849 Anne Brewis Stobart, daughter of William Stobart of Picktree. He died at Upton Manor in 1881 and was buried at Moreton Parish Church, Wirral.
