= Ward Jackson Park =

Municipal park in Hartlepool, County Durham, England

Coordinates: 54.685°N 1.241°W

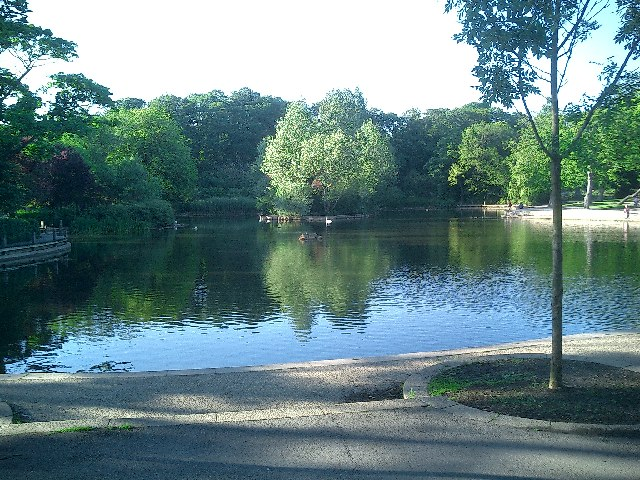
Ward Jackson Park

Ward Jackson Park is a municipal park located in Hartlepool, England. It is named after Ralph Ward Jackson, a local industrialist, who founded West Hartlepool in the 19th century. In later life, Ward Jackson encountered financial difficulties and a fund was established to help him out in his old age. In view of his sudden death, the money collected was used to create a public park. It is Grade II listed in Historic England's Register of Parks and Gardens.

== History ==
The park was established in 1883 in memory of the founder of West Hartlepool, Ralph Ward Jackson (1806–1880). The land for the park was purchased by a Mr Wooler of Sandberge Hall near Darlington. The 17-acre (6.9 ha) site was purchased by public subscription, two acres (0.81 ha) being donated by Wooler himself. The lodge house dates from 1883, the bandstand and the fountain from 1901 and the clock tower at the Grange Road entrance from 1923.

The park lies on a gently undulating site which had been agricultural land known as Old Cow Pasture belong to Tunstall Hall which lies to the south-west. A competition for the park's design was won by the architect T.W. Helliwell and the landscape gardener Lister Kershaw but in order to save money, the development was finally assigned to Matthew Scott. It is bounded on the east by Park Avenue, on the west and south by Elwick Road and to the north by private home.

== Development and facilities ==
The south-eastern entrance leads in to a lodge (1883) designed by Henry Suggitt and Son, while the north east entrance at the western end of Grange Road is flanked by a brick clock tower with stone details and inscribed "The gift of Alderman John Brown, J P Mayor 1902-3-4. In consideration for others 1921". The tennis and quoit area from the late 1890s in the south-east corner was replaced by a hard tennis court in the 1930s. The rose garden from 1952 was extended in 1979. The park bell to the south of the rose garden was installed around 1924. The bowling green in the north-east corner was added in 1913. The bandstand to the west of the bowling green was presented by Sir William Gray in 1900. The park's lake with an island to the north west was expanded from a small existing pond. It is bordered by an elaborate cast-iron fountain completed in 1902 to commemorate Queen Victoria's diamond jubilee. The park also contains a small children's playground.

The park contains a memorial commemorating the lives of local service personnel who died in the Second Boer War. In September 2022, a statue of a Boer War soldier sculpted by Ray Lonsdale was installed on the top of the memorial: it was intended to replace a previous statue which disappeared in 1968.
