= Charles Inman (banker) =

English merchant, businessperson and banker (1791–1858)

- Born: 1791; Lancashire, England
- Died: 1858 (aged 66–67); Bebington, England
- Occupation: Banker
- Spouse: Jane Clay (m. 1817)
- Children: 8

Charles Inman (1791–1858) was an English merchant, businessperson and banker, a director of the Bank of Liverpool.

== Early life ==
He was son of Robert Inman, merchant of Lancaster, and his first wife Anne Salisbury, daughter of Thomas Salisbury of Kirkham; and grandson of the slave-trader Charles Inman (1725–1767).

Inman was apprenticed to his cousin, a cotton broker in Liverpool. The cotton merchants traded as Swainson & Inman in the 1820s. The partnership of Charles Inman and Anthony Swainson was dissolved in 1831. Anthony Swainson (born 1782) was brother to Charles Swainson of Preston, and their mother was Susannah Inman, daughter of Charles Inman the elder.

== Career ==
In 1818 Inman left Liverpool for Leicester: he was one of three partners who put in capital from 1817 to re-finance the Pickfords firm of carriers. One of the other partners was Joseph Baxendale. From 1809 he had been a partner in the Bannister Hall company headed by Charles Swainson. With Inman at Leicester, the other management was Matthew Pickford and Baxendale in Manchester, and Zachary Langton in London. Over time Baxendale bought out Inman and Langton, obtaining complete control in 1847. On withdrawing from Pickfords, in 1838 over Sabbatarian concerns, Inman returned to Liverpool.

A director of the Bank of Liverpool, Inman was first on the board in 1838. He then served from 1840 to 1858, in parallel with Adam Hodgson who outlived him.

== Later life and death ==
Later in life, Inman moved from Netherfield Road, Everton, to Spital Hall, Bebington, in the Wirral. He died there on 11 November 1858. His funeral service was given by the Rev. Edward Hatch Hoare of Barkby, an associate from the Church Missionary Society in Leicester. He was buried in Bebington churchyard. The site of the large Netherfield Road house was put to use with the Institution for Infectious Diseases. It was a hospital, having some finance from Liverpool Town Council to fulfil the terms of the 1866 Contagious Diseases Act.

== Family and legacy ==
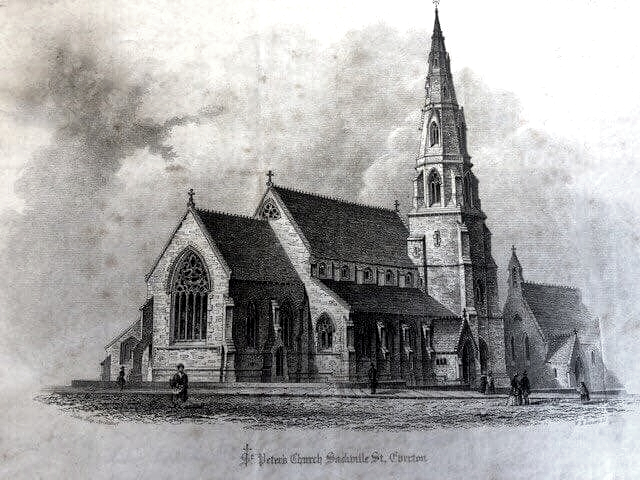
St Peter's Church, Everton, after a drawing by John Hay

Inman married in 1817 Jane Clay, daughter of Thomas Clay of Liverpool; her sister Mary married Anthony Swainson. They had eight children, including Thomas Inman, the second son, and William Inman.

- Robert Inman, eldest son, died 1871 aged 52.
- Charles Inman, third son, married in 1853 Decima Davies, daughter of Thomas Lancaster Davies MD of Jamaica.
- Their daughter Elizabeth married in 1852 Charles Swainson.

Jane Inman died in 1865 at Spital Hall, at age 72.

St Peter's Church, Sackville Street, Everton (Church of England) was completed in 1849. Inman donated the land, laid the foundation stone in a ceremony where the architect Mr Hay (of Hay of Liverpool) showed the plans, and gave much of the building cost. His daughter Elizabeth's marriage took place there, in 1852.

The church was destroyed in 1942.
