= Ralph Ward Jackson =

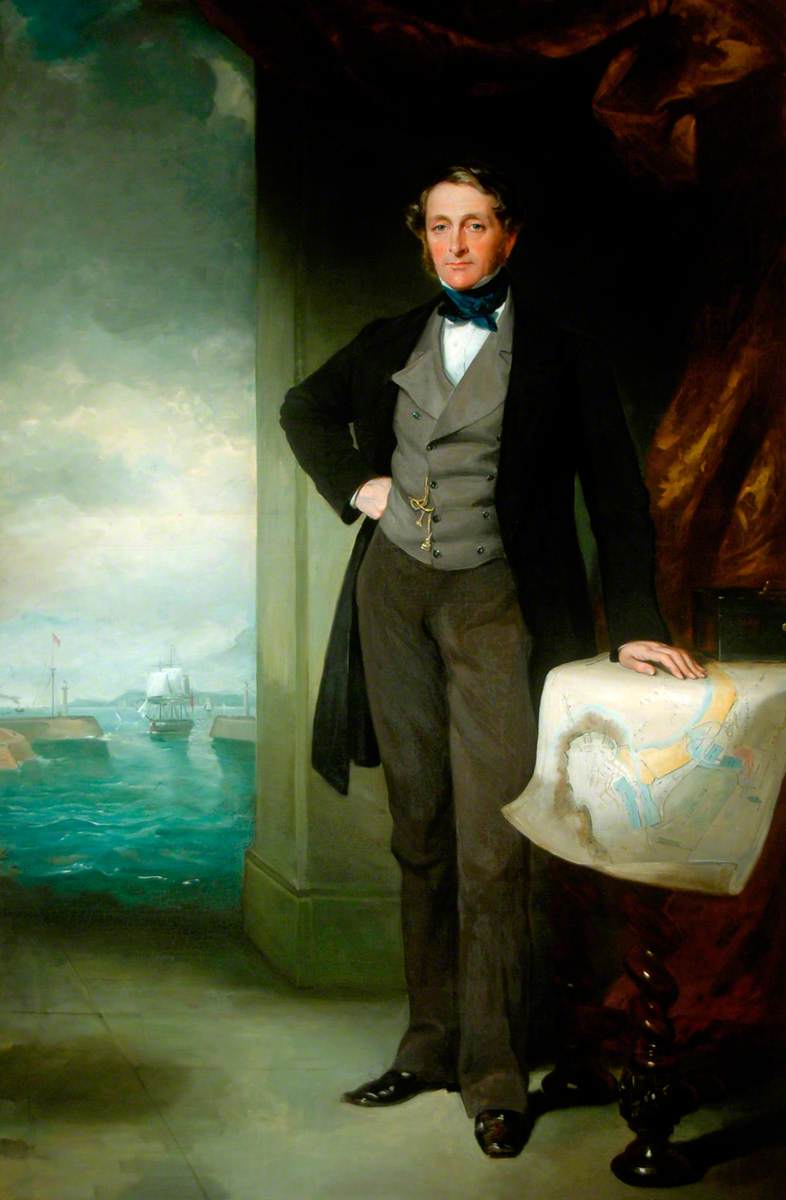
- Ralph Ward Jackson
- In office 1868–1874
- Preceded by: New constituency
- Succeeded by: Thomas Richardson

Personal details
- Born: 7 June 1806 Normanby, England
- Died: 6 August 1880 (aged 74) London, England
- Party: Conservative
- Spouse: Susanna Swainson
- Children: 1
- Profession: Railway promoter, entrepreneur

Ralph Ward Jackson (7 June 1806, Normanby – 6 August 1880, London) was a British railway promoter, entrepreneur, and politician. He founded West Hartlepool, England, in the 19th century.

== Life ==
Son of William and Susanna Louisa Ward-Jackson, he was a Conservative elected at the 1868 general election as the first Member of Parliament for The Hartlepools but was defeated at the 1874 general election.

Ward Jackson Park, located on the western end of Elwick Road in Hartlepool, is named in his memory.

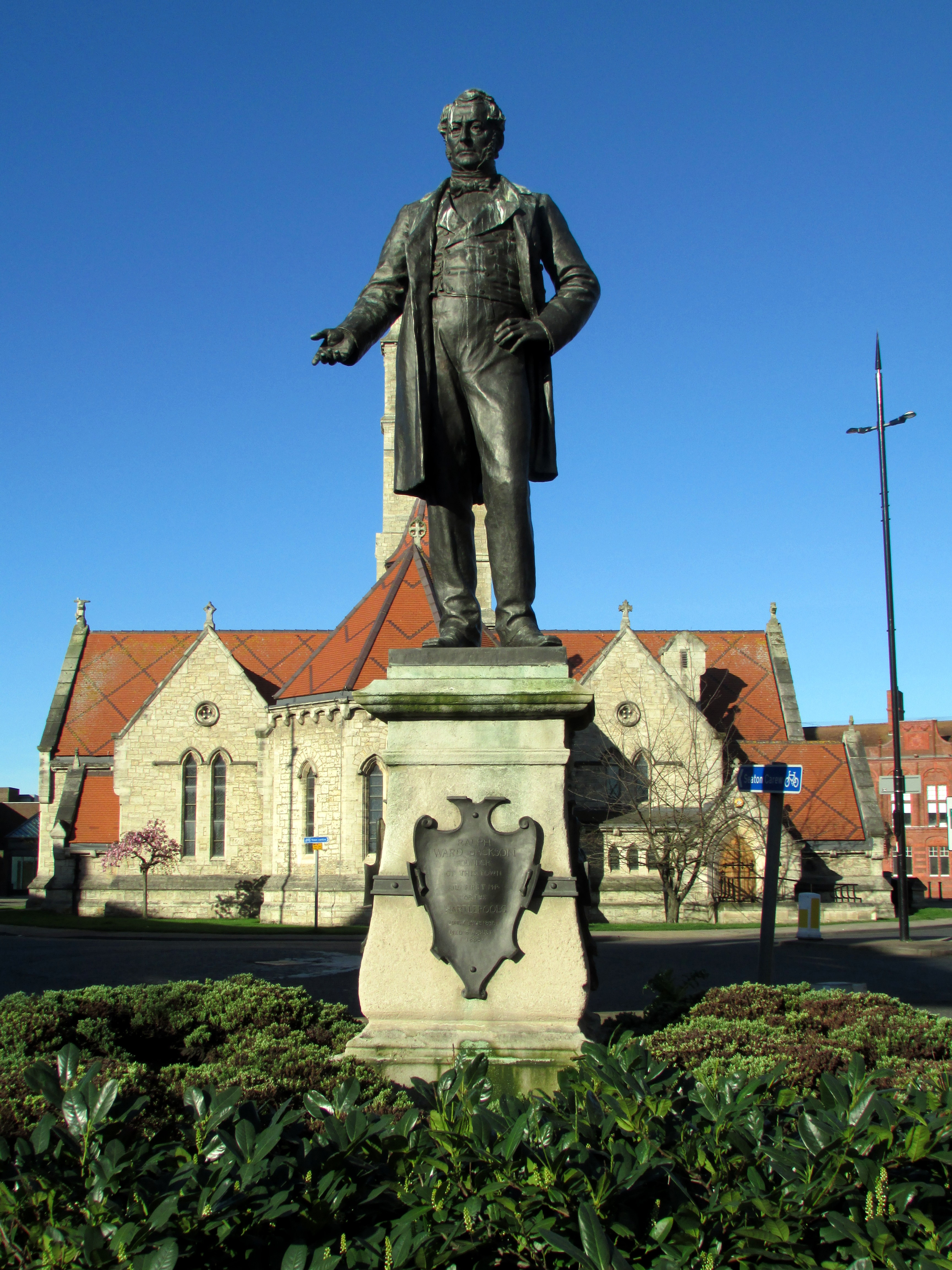
Statue of Ralph Ward Jackson, Church Street, Hartlepool

== Family ==
Jackson married Susanna Swainson, daughter of the industrialist Charles Swainson, in 1829. They had one son.

Parliament of the United Kingdom
New constituency	Member of Parliament for The Hartlepools; 1868–1874	Succeeded by Thomas Richardson
