= Harris Museum =

Art gallery and public library in Preston, England

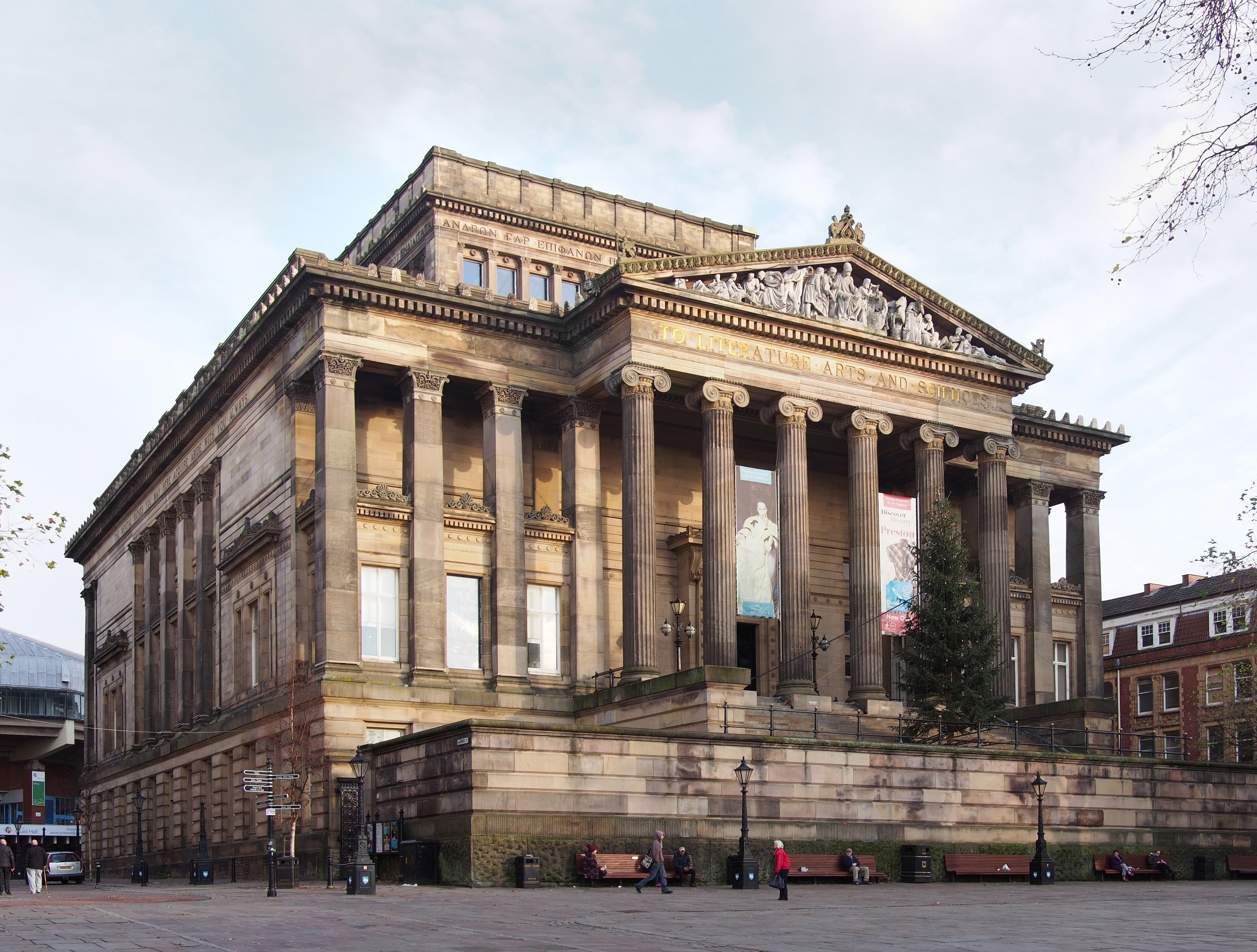
- The Harris building

- Location in Preston city centre
- Established: 1893; 133 years ago
- Location: Market Square, Preston PR1 2PP; United Kingdom
- Coordinates: 53.75911°N 2.69825°W
- Type: Art Gallery and Public Library
- Visitors: 345,258 annually (pre-2025 re-opening)
- Assistant Director: Tim Joel
- Public transit access: Preston Bus Station; Preston Railway Station
- Website: www.theharris.org.uk

Listed Building – Grade I
- Official name: Harris Public Library, Museum and Art Gallery
- Designated: 12 June 1950
- Reference no.: 1207306

The Harris Museum, now known as The Harris, is a Grade I-listed building in Preston, Lancashire, England. Founded by Edmund Harris in 1877, it is a local history and fine art museum, and public library, covering 60,000 square feet (5,600 m^{2}) and 23 public spaces. Prior to its 2025 re-opening, following a £19 million renovation, it attracted around 345,258 visitors annually. Monthly visitor numbers have reportedly more than doubled since its re-opening.

Like other publicly funded museums in the United Kingdom, The Harris does not charge visitors for admission, although visitors are requested to make a donation if they are able.

== History ==
In the 19th century, it became legal to raise money for libraries by local taxation, and the town of Preston wanted a grand museum and library for its inhabitants. From 1850, local people held fund-raising events; and in 1877 Edmund Robert Harris, a Preston lawyer, left in his will £300,000 to establish a trust and support a public library, museum and art gallery with Preston Corporation.

In 1879, the first Preston lending library was set up in the Town Hall basement, while a public museum was set up on Cross Street, opening 1 May 1880. Success led the council to erect a new building for both. Work started on the museum in 1882 during the Preston Guild, and it officially opened in 1893.

== Design ==
The building was designed by a local architect, James Hibbert, who chose a Neo-Classical style. For the 1880s, this was in some ways contrary to the Gothic Revival style which was popular at the time and features in numerous contemporary buildings in Preston, including the old Town Hall which stood on the western side of the Harris.

=== Exterior ===
The building's exterior reflects Hibbert's vision of a neo-classicism through "simplicity, symmetry of plan, truthfulness of expression and refinement of detail". Unlike other public buildings designed in this style (such as the British Museum in London and the Konzerthaus in Berlin), Hibbert's design does not feature steps leading up from the Flag Market but instead has ground-level entrances on each side of the building.

A pediment dominates the front of the building and features a sculpture based upon Raphael's painting The School of Athens. Interpreting Hibbert's design fell to London sculptor Edwin Roscoe Mullins and features the central figure of the Ancient Athenian general Pericles, surrounded by twelve other men arranged symmetrically to either side. The sculpture is considered Mullins' principal work. Beneath the pediment is the inscription To Literature, Arts and Science. There are further inscriptions along the sides, including "on Earth there is nothing great but man : in man there is nothing great but mind." On the lantern tower a quotation in Ancient Greek from Pericles' Funeral Oration.

Supporting the pediment are six Ionic fluted columns leading down to a raised portico overlooking the Flag Market.

=== Interior ===
The building's interior is dominated by a central hall rising over 120 feet from the ground floor to the ceiling of the lantern tower. As well as the ground floor, there are three upper floors with balconies opening up onto the central hall, and collection halls and exhibition spaces on each floor.

The interior design features classical influences from Ancient Greece, Assyria and Egypt, including columns and mosaic floors, and copies of Classical and Renaissance sculpture representing the "whole range and history of the world's greatest achievements in art". Only the Greek and Assyrian friezes on the upper floors and the copy of Lorenzo Ghiberti's Gates of Paradise on the ground floor remain of the original sculptures.

== Collections ==
The Harris collections cover fine art, decorative art, costume, textiles and history including collections on archaeology and local history. The museum has a permanent history gallery called Discover Preston which covers Preston's history but also includes a Discovery Room featuring the wider collections. Highlights of the Discovery Room include a display of the complete skeleton discovered in 1970, of the 13,500-year-old Poulton Elk, a skeleton of an Ice Age elk with two embedded man-made barbed points, the earliest relic of human occupation of Lancashire.

The fine art collection includes over 800 oil paintings featuring work by Richard Ansdell, George Frederick Watts, Lawrence Alma-Tadema, Stanley Spencer, Lucian Freud, Ivon Hitchens and Graham Sutherland as well as local artists Anthony Devis and Reginald Aspinwall. The decorative art collection includes collections of British ceramics and glass, and are displayed in the Ceramics and Glass Gallery. In addition there is a contemporary art programme of national and international artists, touring shows and in-house exhibitions.

A Foucault pendulum hangs in the central foyer, through all the floors, over a butterfly-shaped plate marked with the hours of the day. As a result of the rotation of the Earth, this functions as a decorative and reasonably-accurate clock. The building is also decorated with a number of plaster casts of classical friezes throughout the central atrium and a 19th-century copy of the Baptistery doors from Florence is located on the ground floor. These were part of the original design scheme by the architect James Hibbert.

== Library ==
The building also houses Preston City's Public Library, which is run by Lancashire County Council. The first librarian of the Harris Free Public Library was a William Bramwell who retired in 1916 aged eighty-one. The Harris library holds important book collections including the Shepherd Collection donated to Preston by Dr Richard Shepherd in 1761, with additions funded by the Shepherd bequest, local studies material, nineteenth-century journals, rare books and art books. Also the Spencer collection of illustrated children's books and chapbooks. At the time of the opening of the Harris, William Bramwell was also the librarian of the Dr Shepherd Library which found a home at the Harris having been located in various buildings and institutions across the town.

== Gallery ==
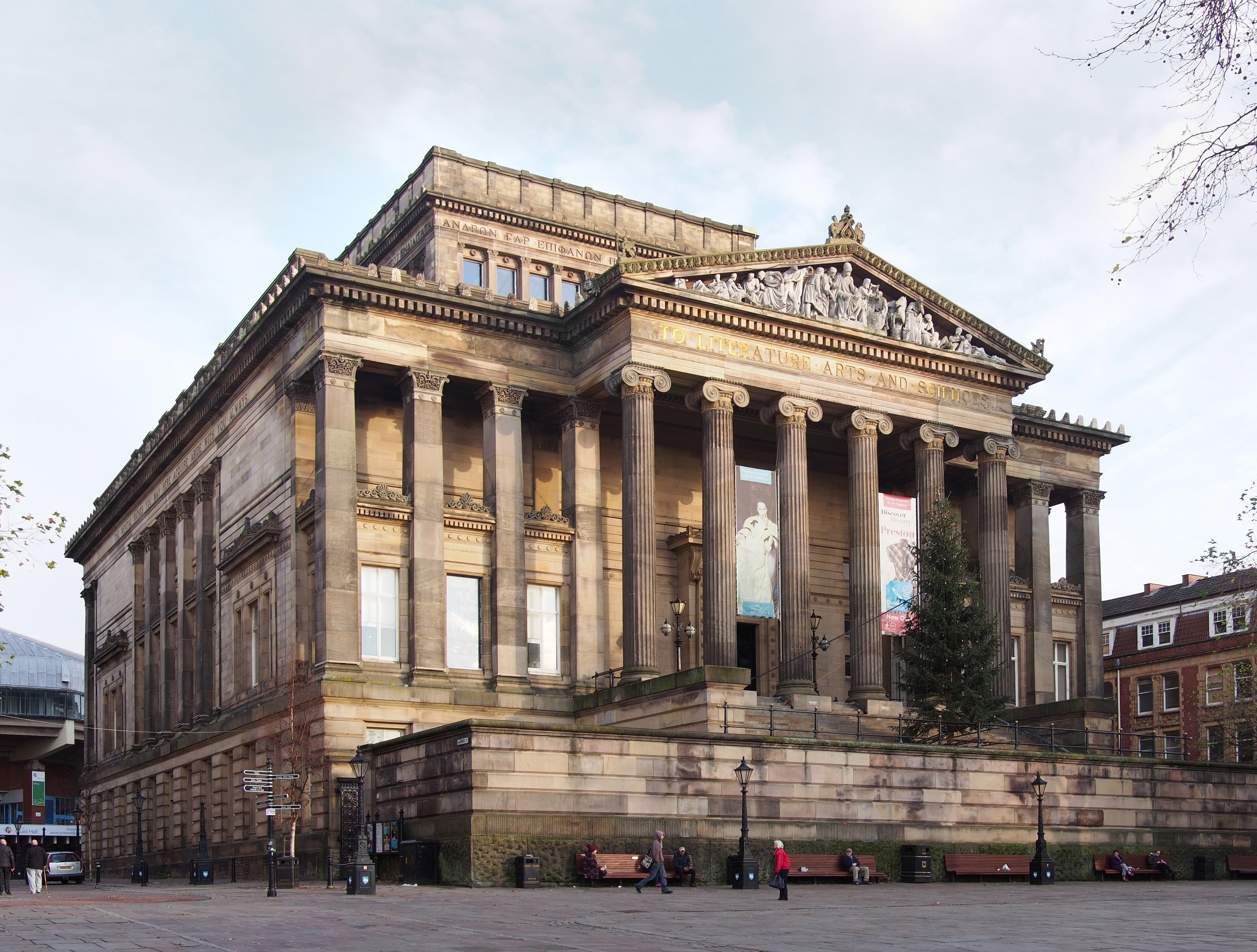
The Harris

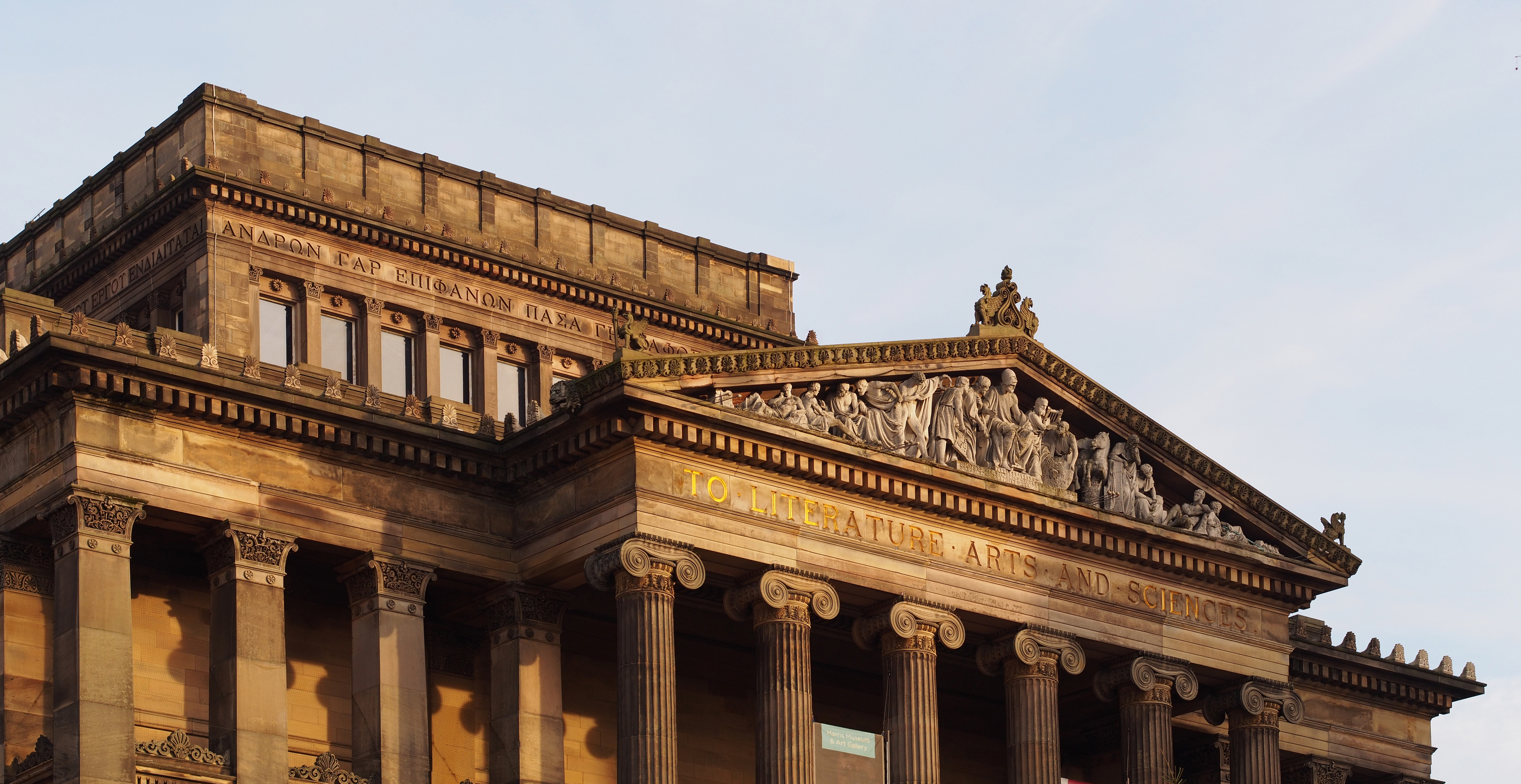
Detail of the sculptures above the columns

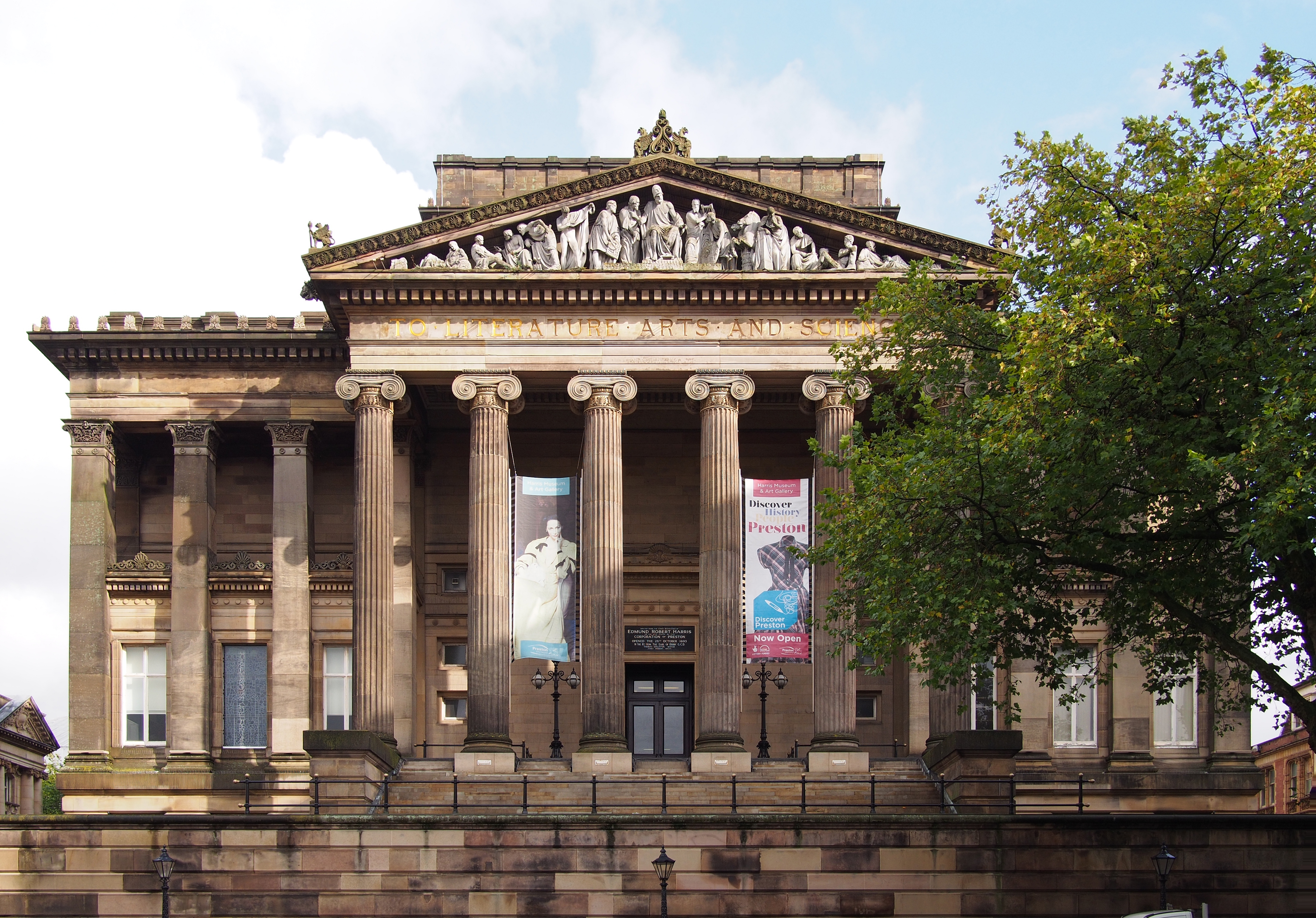
The front of the building, as seen from the Flag Market

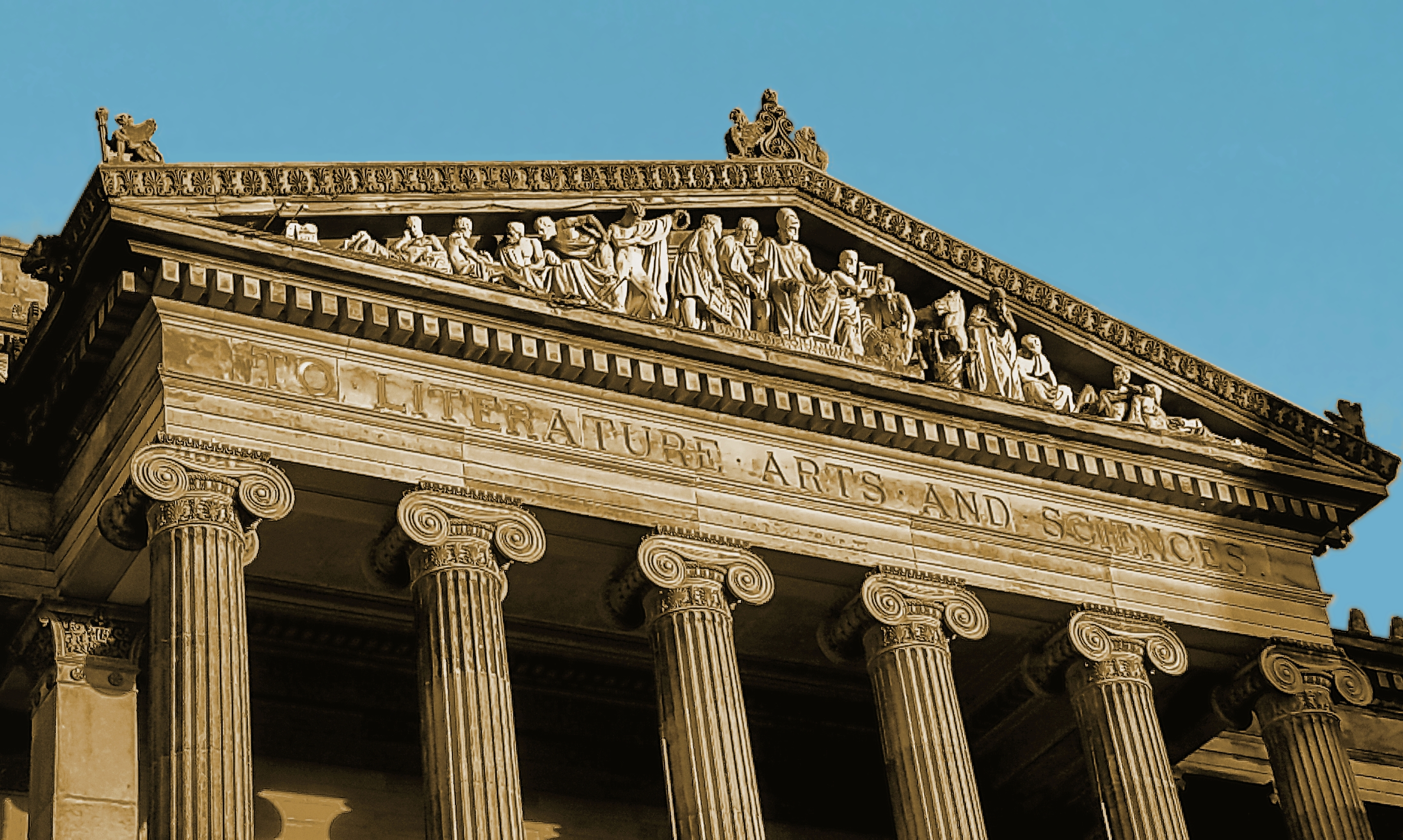
The pediment, with the central figure of Pericles

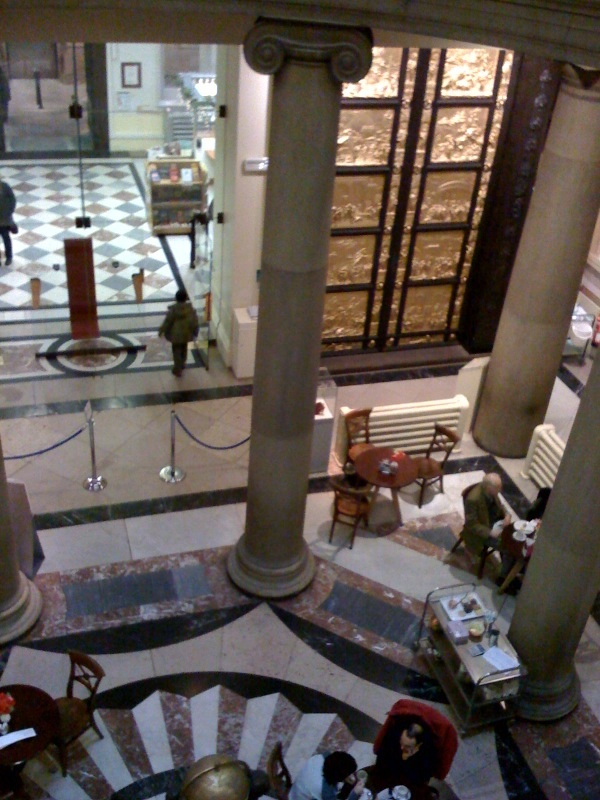
The entrance and rotunda from the first floor

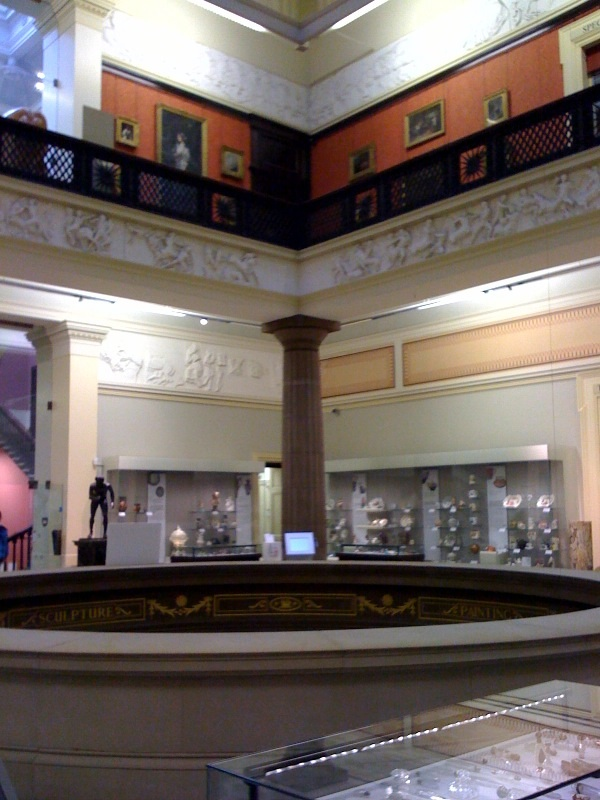
The gallery entrances from the first floor landing

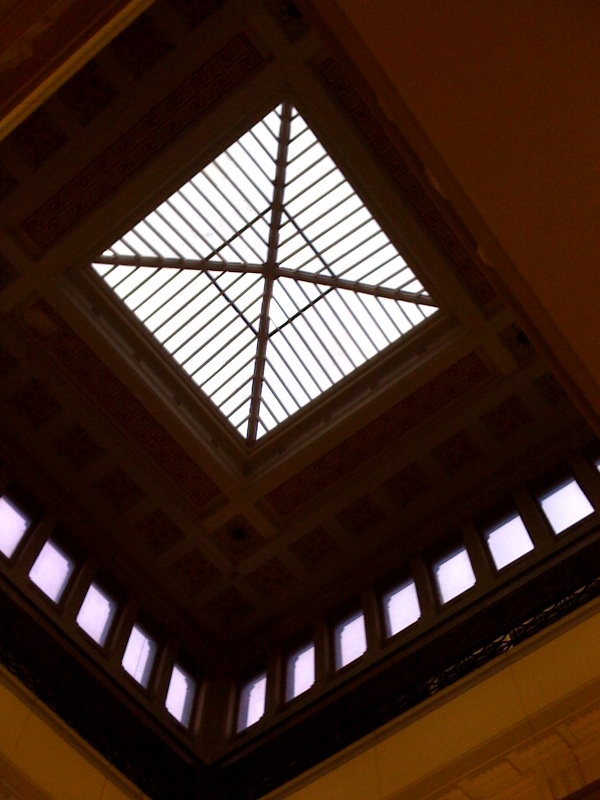
The skylight pyramid at the top of the main atrium

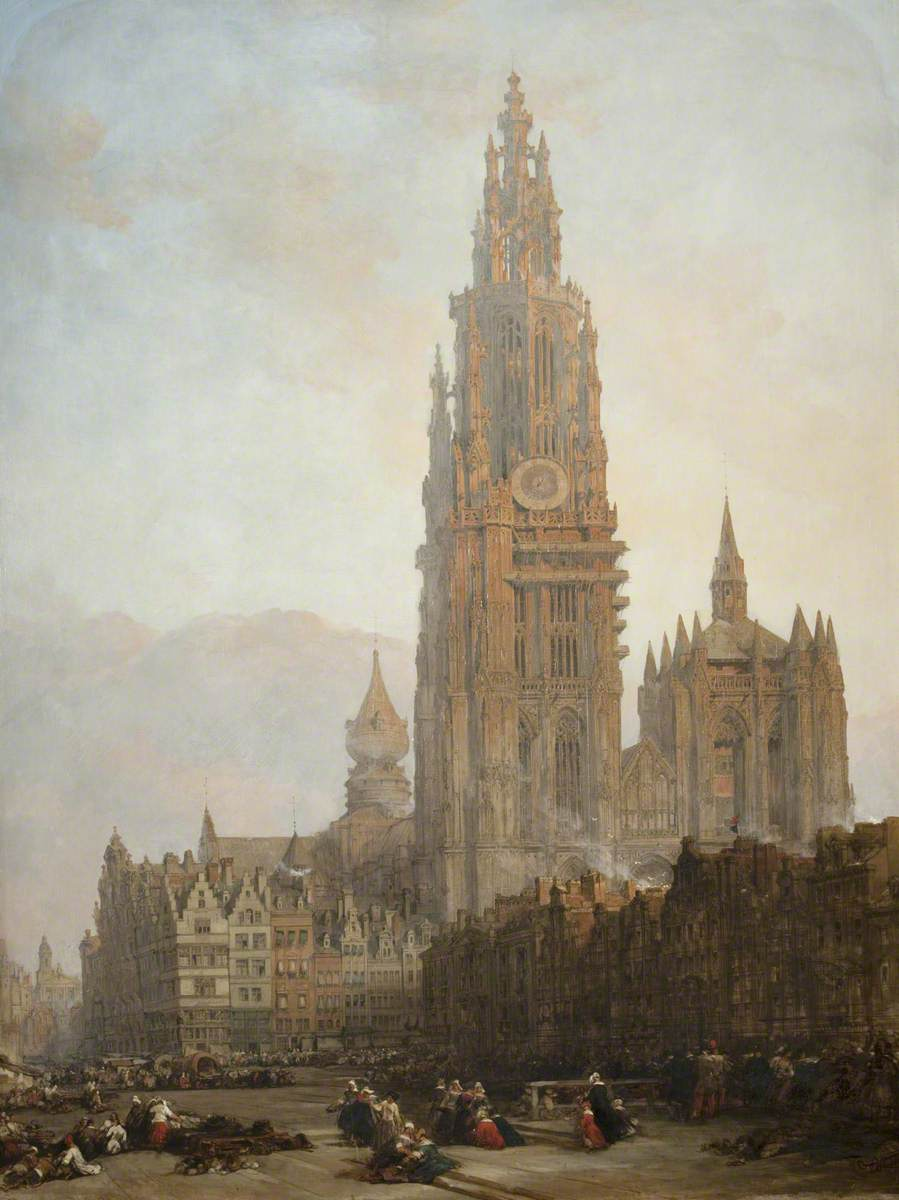
West Front of Antwerp Cathedral by David Roberts, 1847

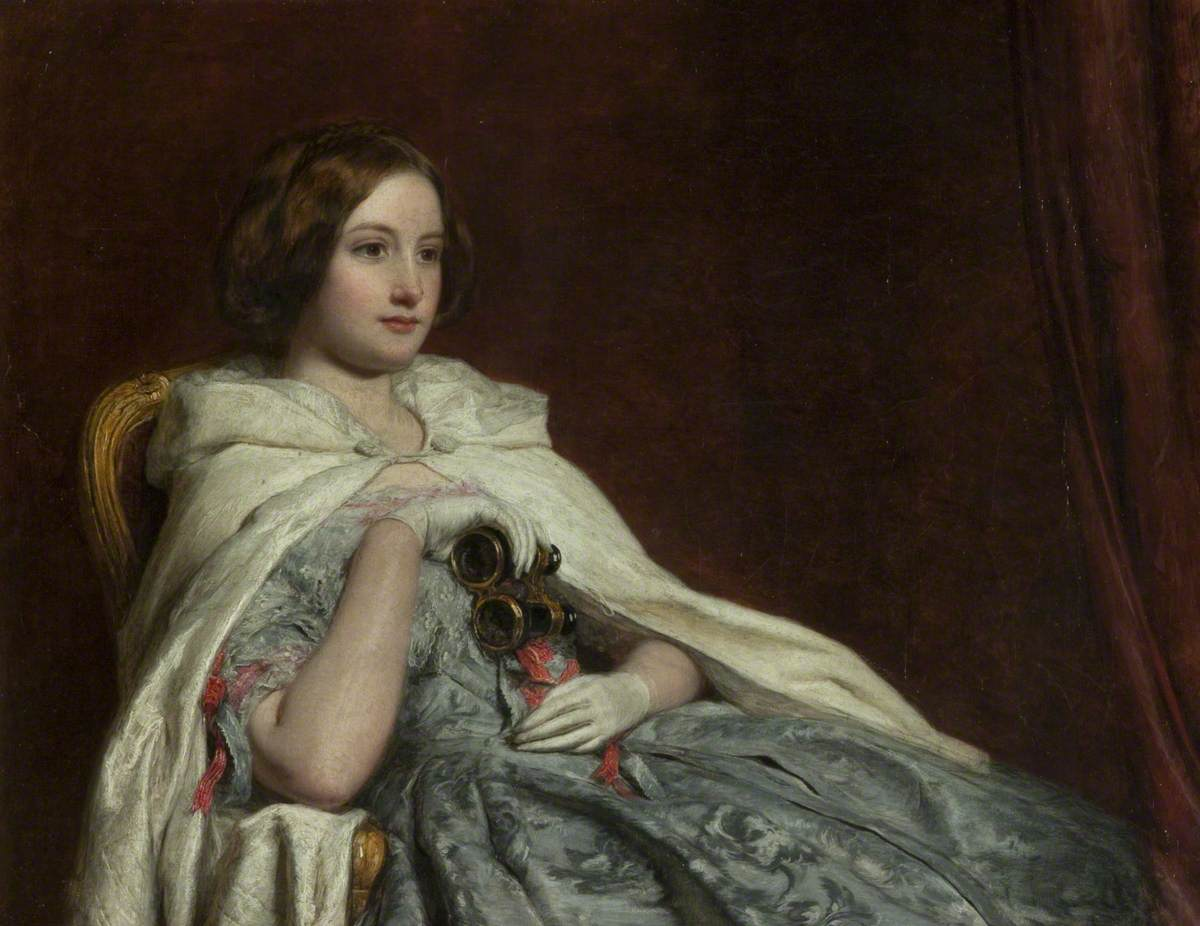
At the Opera by William Powell Frith, 1855

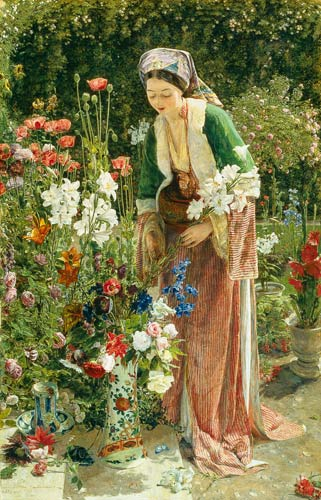
In the Bey's Garden, by John Frederick Lewis, in the museum

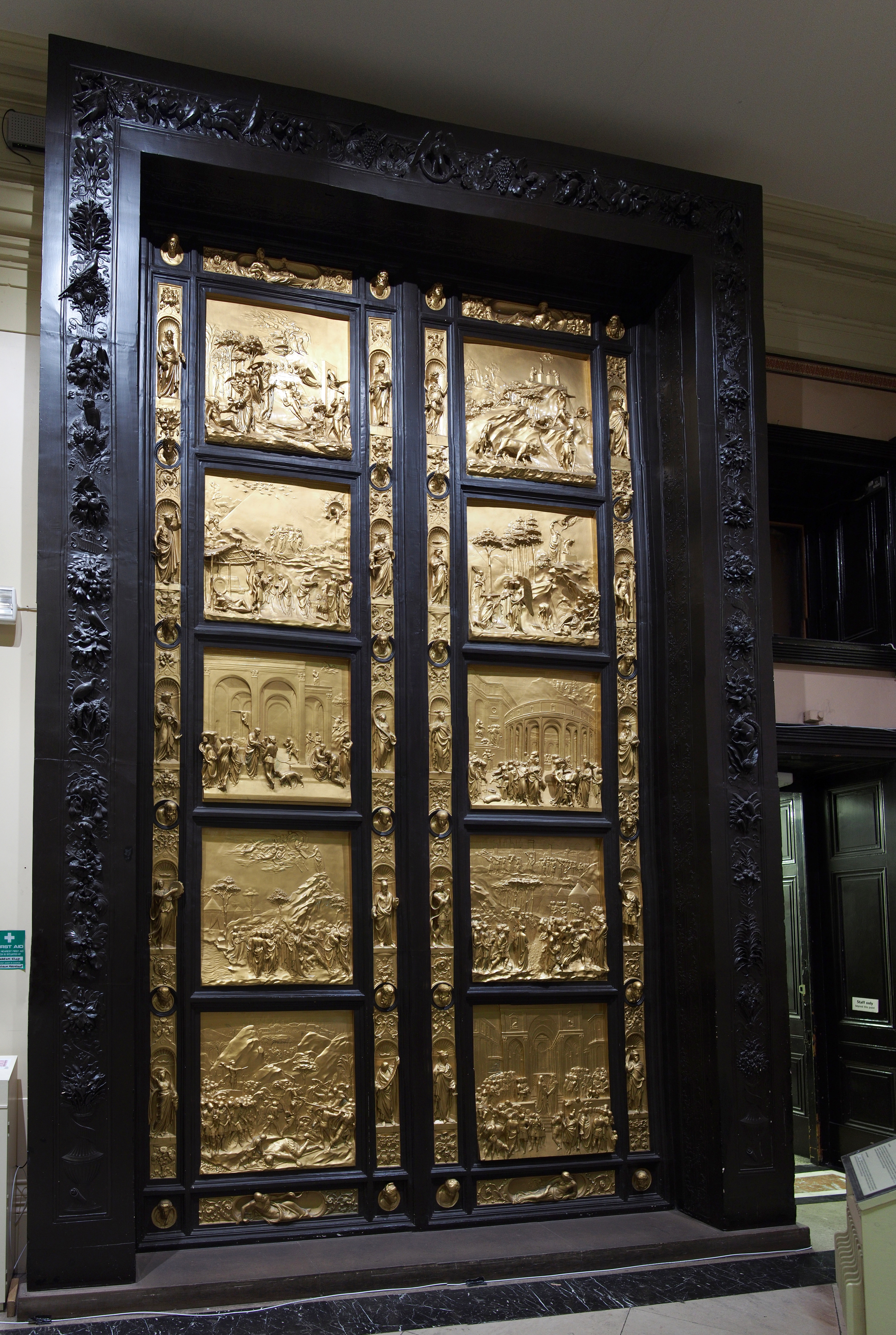
Copy of The Gates of Paradise - the east doors of The Florence Baptistery.

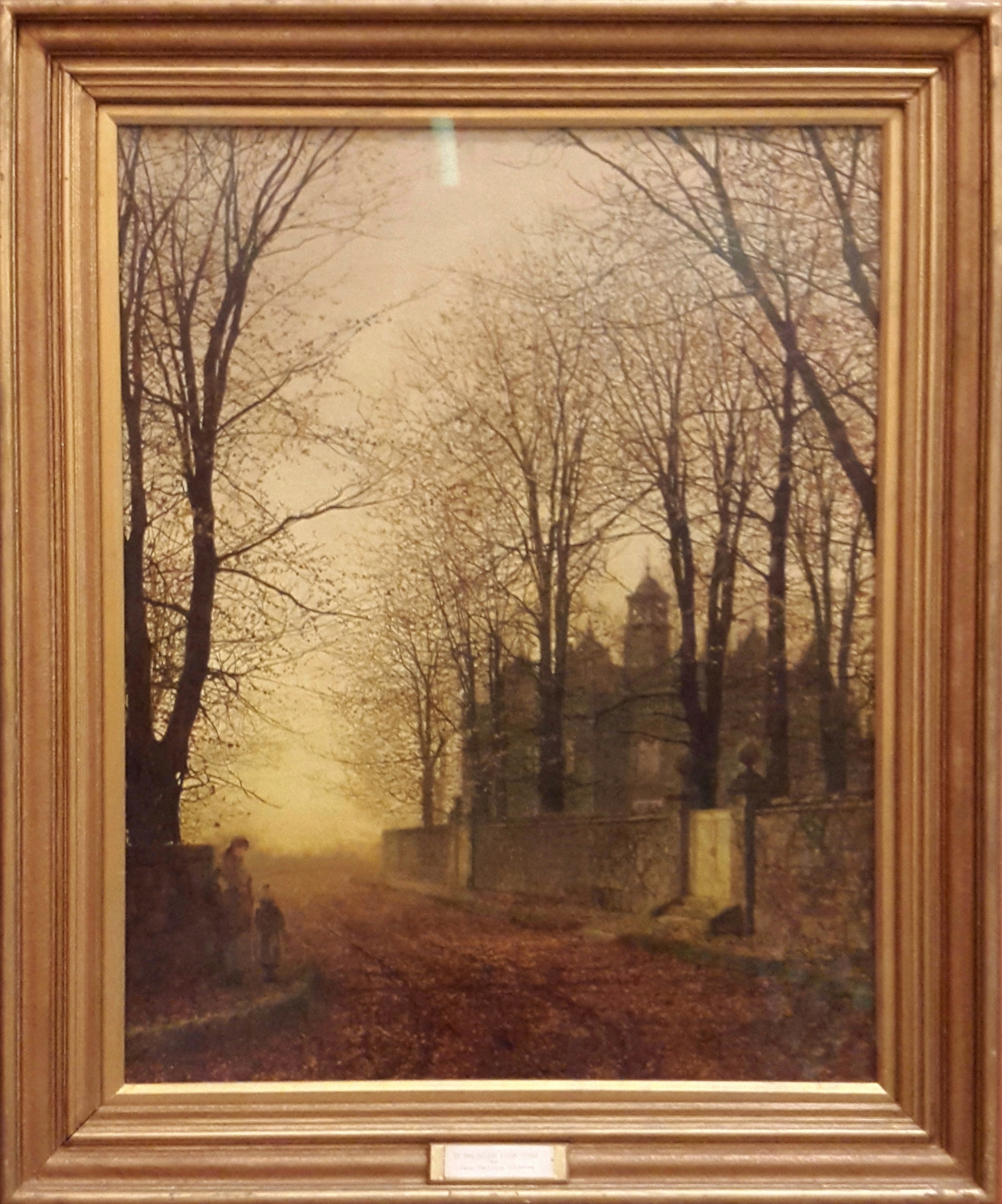
In the Golden Olden Time, by John Atkinson Grimshaw, oil on canvas, c1870

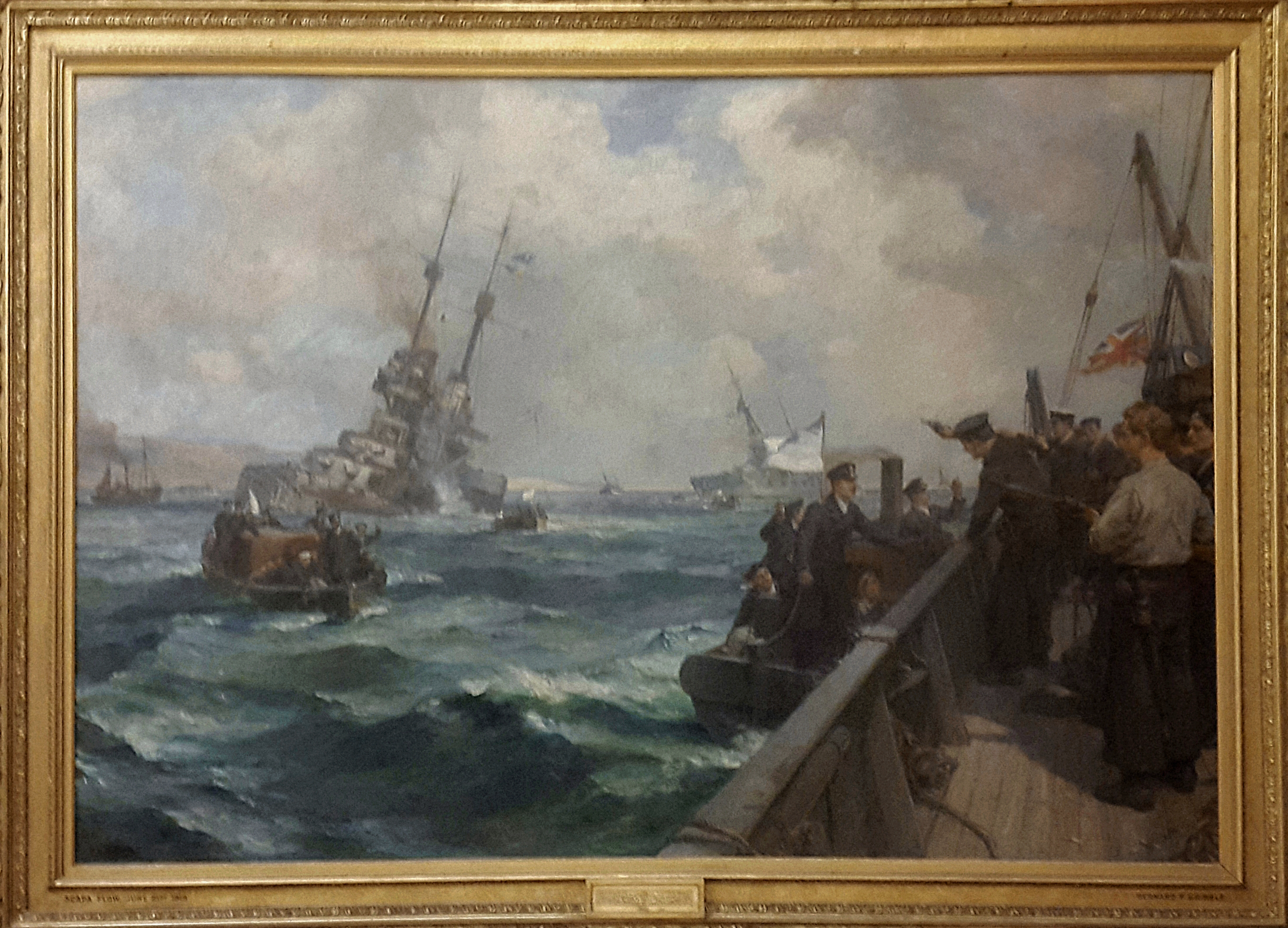
Scapa Flow by B. F. Gribble, depicting the surrender of the German High Seas Fleet at Scapa Flow on 18 November 1918, oil on canvas, 1920

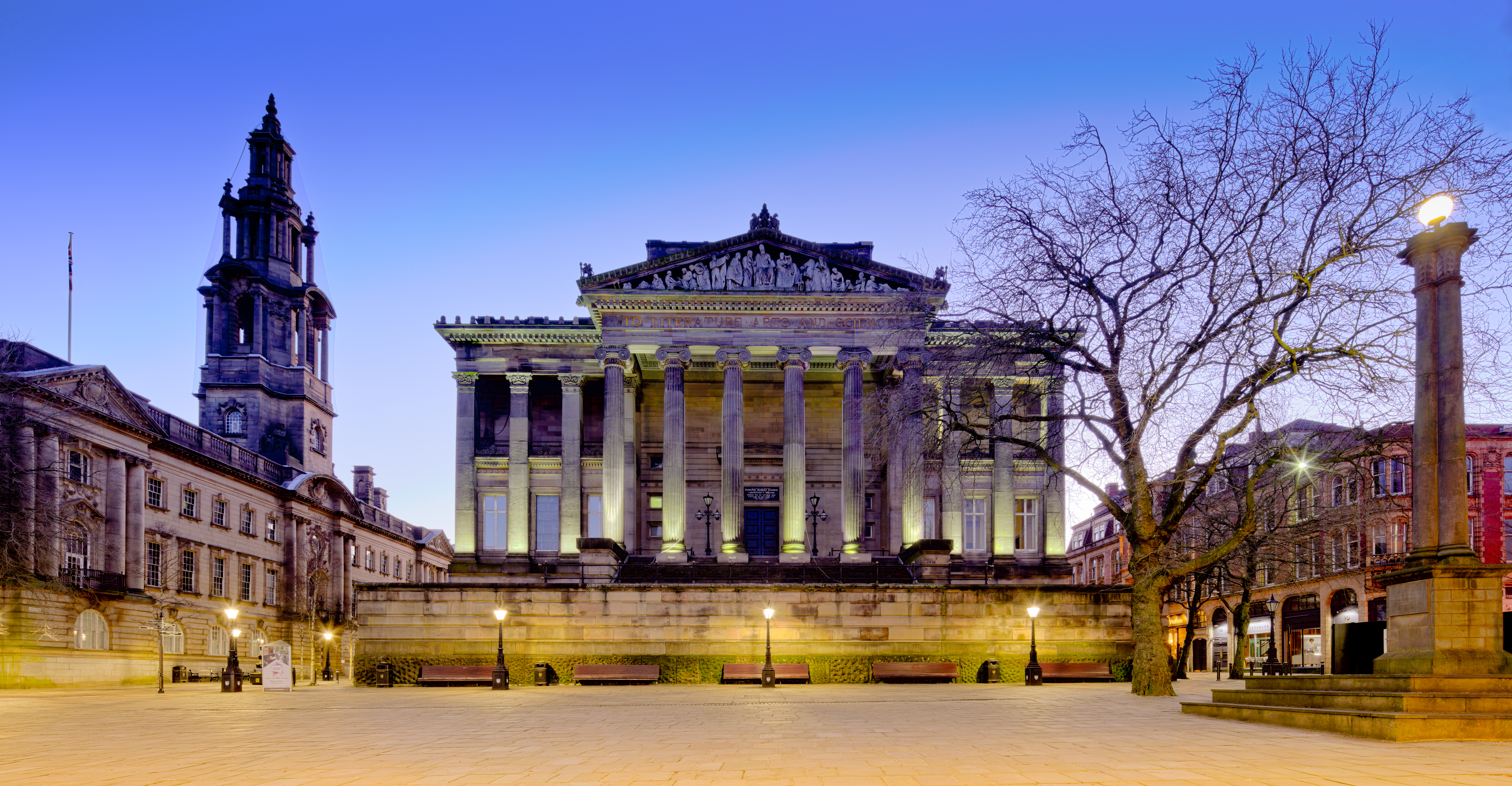
Blue hour photograph of the Harris Museum taken in the morning 5 March 2022

== Renovation Project ==
Following a successful bid for support from the National Lottery Heritage Fund, in October 2020 plans were submitted for a £10.7M renovation and restoration project called #HarrisYourPlace with the aim "to establish the Harris as the UK’s first blended museum, art gallery and library". The project is said to include "much-needed conservation works" on the roof, stonework and basement to help address the building's "long-standing damp problem". It will also reveal some of the Harris’ original architectural details which have been hidden by previous building works, including reopening an original entrance way to improve accessibility. A new lift and toilet on the ground floor will improve the building's accessibility to disabled visitors, and a new staircase will replace the existing fire exit stairs.

These proposed works are in addition to a £150K Children's Place scheme scheduled to open in 2024, which will redevelop the children's library space and improve facilities for school groups and families.

== Appearances in media and products ==
The Harris features in the Preston version of Monopoly, launched in October 2020.

== See also ==
- Listed buildings in Preston, Lancashire
