= Super Sunday (British TV programme) =

- Presented by: David Jones
- Opening theme: "G.O.A.T", by Kasabian ft. Cristale
- Country of origin: England

Production
- Running time: Variable

Original release
- Network: Sky Sports
- Release: 16 August 1992 – present

Related
- Monday Night Football

Super Sunday is Sky Sports' flagship live association football programme, broadcasting live Premier League football on most Sundays over the course of a season. The main live game will typically kick off at 4:30 pm, often following a 2:00 pm game, on the Sky Sports Premier League channel.

It had been presented since its debut in August 1992 by former TV-am host Richard Keys alongside a variety of guest match pundits until January 2011. From the 2005–06 season, former Liverpool player Jamie Redknapp joined Keys as a regular pundit. The commentary team of Martin Tyler and former Scotland striker Andy Gray became synonymous with Sky's football coverage, although other commentators were also used. Gray was sacked in January 2011 ‘unacceptable and offensive behaviour’ and in April 2011 former Manchester United defender Gary Neville was confirmed as his replacement. Former Liverpool player and fan Jamie Carragher joined in 2013.

== Innovation ==
The first match shown on Super Sunday was between Nottingham Forest and Liverpool on 16 August 1992, a match Forest won 1-0. This first broadcast featured a digital on-screen graphic (DOG) throughout the game showing the score and match time. It was the first time a UK broadcaster had done such a thing and DOGs are now part of coverage of virtually all televised sports worldwide.

== Broadcast times ==
In the first four seasons of the programme, Ford Super Sunday – the title due to major sponsorship with the Ford Motor Company – used to start at 2pm, giving viewers two hours build-up before the slightly untraditional kick-off time of 4pm, as opposed to a Saturday kick-off at 3pm. Eventually, Sky decided this was a bit too much, and in 1996 decided to start the programme at 3pm instead. From the 2004–05 season, some Super Sunday coverage started as early as 1:00 pm if two live games were shown that day. From the 2005–06, coverage began at 3:30pm if only one live game was shown.

Sometimes, three live games are shown on Super Sunday, with the games kicking off at 12pm, 2:15pm and 4:30pm respectively. This can happen because of one of two reasons, either Sky selecting three matches for live broadcasting on a Sunday during the three time slots or the Saturday 12:30pm game being rescheduled for Sunday at 12:00pm due to the team featured playing in the UEFA Europa League or the UEFA Europa Conference League the preceding Thursday night. Sunday noon kick-offs are sometimes broadcast on TNT Sports instead.

Sky advertise Super Sunday as showing the Premier League's biggest match of the weekend, but, although they have first pick of live Premier League games on most weekends, there are numerous restrictions which mean the best game does not necessarily kick off at 4:30pm, or is even broadcast on Sky. Police restrictions mean many derby matches must kick off earlier while there are restrictions on the number of times Sky can show each team per season. Additionally, Sky can not move a game to take place on Super Sunday if one of the teams involved is playing in the UEFA Champions League the following Tuesday, in order to give the team time to recover. As Sky are also the broadcasters of the EFL Cup, the final takes centre stage on the network on a Sunday mid-afternoon (usually 4:30pm) in late February/early March, meaning on that particular day, only one Premier League match is broadcast live, usually at 2pm. This was changed to 1:30pm from the 2022-23 season.

In the 2020-21 season, when fans were not allowed to attend matches due to the COVID-19 pandemic, resulting in all matches being televised, Super Sunday was sometimes expanded to broadcast three matches. The matches at 2pm, 4:30pm were retained, with an extra match that kicked off at 7pm or 7:15pm, depending on the scheduled games that day.

From the 2025-26 season, Sky has the rights to broadcast every match scheduled on a Sunday (except for any matches selected for broadcast on TNT Sports that are moved from their original 12:30pm slot on a Saturday). All 2pm kick-offs are broadcast live individually on separate channels before the featured match takes place at 4:30pm as usual. Additional features to the coverage on the weeks when multiple matches are shown include a dedicated 'multi-view' screening allowing viewers to watch all 2pm matches concurrently, and a special analysis programme entitled Super Sunday Extra Time presented by Jamie Carragher, which is shown after all matches that day have taken place.

== Presentation ==
Richard Keys had hosted the programme from one of the grounds, usually from that of the second game, alongside Jamie Redknapp and at least one more guest. The panel often introduce the first game with an empty stadium behind them because of the staggered kick-off times. This was until 27 January 2011 when Keys resigned from Sky Sports following allegations of sexist remarks and unacceptable behaviour in the workplace.

Martin Tyler and Andy Gray have been the most regular commentators on Super Sunday, appearing either as a team or split over two matches. When there were two matches, Gray would commentate on the main match and act as a studio pundit for the other game as well as appearing on The Last Word discussion programme alongside Keys immediately after Super Sunday on Sky Sports 1.

However, following sexist comments towards assistant referee Sian Massey in a conversation prior to a match between Wolverhampton Wanderers F.C. and Liverpool on Saturday, 22 January, Gray was sacked by Sky and soon after Richard Keys handed in his resignation. Keys said:

It would be impossible to go on without Andy.

Keys was permanently replaced by Ed Chamberlin for the 2011-12 season, after Sky were impressed by his presenting on the Survival Sunday coverage at the end of the 2010-11 season. The Last Word discussion programme has been dropped since Keys and Gray's departures. Since Chamberlin's departure from Sky, David Jones is the current presenter of Super Sunday since the 2016-17 season, although in a rotating format - the show is also presented occasionally by Kelly Cates. Beginning from the 2025-26 season, Mark Chapman joined the presenting line-up, alternating the role with Jones and Cates.

On some occasions for the final day of the league season, which usually takes place on the Sunday, the programme is presented from the Sky Sports studios in London instead of from one of the grounds hosting a key match that is being broadcast by Sky. During the 2020-21 season, the programme was largely presented from Sky's London studio due to COVID-19 restrictions on the number of personnel that can be in attendance at matches. Presentation from a football ground was only done at matches of a significant interest during that season.

== Television contract ==
Although Sky lost its monopoly on broadcasting the Premier League from the 2007–08 season, with Setanta Sports winning 46 games as a result of a European Commission recommendation, Sky retained the rights to all 4 pm kick-offs as part of their renewed £1.4 billion contract. The former Setanta rights were passed on to ESPN from the 2009–10 season, typically showing Saturday evening games.

From the 2010–11 to the 2012–13 seasons, Sky had the vast majority of live Sunday Premier League fixtures, in addition to Saturday lunchtime kick-offs, Monday night games and exclusive rights to midweek fixtures. ESPN could show 23 live matches for each season of which 18 must be shown on a Saturday evening.

From the 2013–14 to the 2015–16 seasons, Sky have the rights to broadcast 116 matches each season, which are broadcast on Sundays, Saturday evenings and Monday nights. BT Sport broadcast 38 matches each season, the majority of which are on Saturday lunchtime, midweek and bank holidays.

From 2016 Sky will show 126 live matches. Fridays at 7.45/8.00 pm, Saturdays at 12.30 pm, Sundays at 1.30 pm and 4 pm and Mondays at 8 pm, as well as any and all bank holiday fixtures.

List of sponsors

Ford 1992 - 2016. The programme was also known as "Ford Escort Super Sunday" in a 2 year stint which lasted from August 1994 to May 1996, where the show's original title reverted back to Ford Super Sunday.

Nissan 2016 - 2018. Following the end of Ford's 24 year association with Sky Sports, the Ford name was dropped from all of the title programmes and Super Sunday was renamed accordingly (Nissan Super Sunday), Ford Monday Night Football and Ford Football Special dropped title sponsorship altogether and were renamed to Monday Night Football and Premier League Live respectively [2016–present] This officially came into effect from the start of Nissan's sponsorship run in the 2016-17 season.

Renault 2018 - 2019. The current programme names from 2016 remained unaltered, but this time carrying Renault's name in the opening title sequence until the end of the 2021-22 season.

Renault (title sponsor) and Bet365 2019 - 2022.

EA Sports, Bet365 and We Buy Any Car 2022 - 2025. Title sponsorship ended, with the programme simply being known as Super Sunday.

Bet365 (pre and post game only) Guinness 0.0, Coca-Cola, Uber Eats and British Army 2025 - 2026.

Bet365 (pre and post game only) Guinness 0.0, Coca-Cola, Uber Eats and IG 2026 - present.

List of title music used 1997–present

Since 1997, Sky Sports have used a series of different songs which have been used for title soundtrack for Super Sunday with some of them also being synonymous with other live Premier League programmes, past and present [e.g. Monday Night Football, [Ford Football Special], Saturday Night Football and Premier League Live].

1997-2000 Out of the Sinking by Paul Weller

1998-1999 D'You Know What I Mean? by Oasis

1999-2001 Right Here, Right Now by Fatboy Slim

2000-2001 Glorious by Andreas Johnson

2001-2002 Lovin' Each Day by Ronan Keating

2002-2003 Carnaval de Paris by Dario G

2004-2009 The Time Is Now by Moloko

2009-2011 Club Foot by Kasabian

2011-2015 Written in the Stars by Tinie Tempah featuring Eric Turner

2015-2017 Higher by Sigma featuring Labrinth

2017-2019 Found What I've Been Looking For by Tom Grennan

2019-2020 Something's Gotta Give by Labrinth

2019-2025 Stop This Flame by Celeste

2025–present G.O.A.T by Kasabian featuring Cristale
