= Football365 =

Sports website

- Owner: BSkyB
- Revenue: undisclosed
- Website: www.football365.com
- Launched: 1997
- Current status: Active

Football365.com is a website operated by Planet Sport Ltd's Planet Sport Network that also includes TEAMtalk, Planet Football, Planet F1, Planet Rugby, Tennis365 and LoveRugbyLeague from its base in Leeds.

The website primarily covers the Premier League, as well as other European leagues and cups. It takes an informal and humorous approach to dealing with the latest football news and often includes running jokes about individuals connected with the sport. F365 has been noted for the comprehensive coverage it provides, as well as its statistics and comment features.

In 2023, Football365 was ranked as the sixth most popular sports news site in the United Kingdom.

== History ==
The site was founded in 1997 by Arsenal fan and Internet pioneer David Tabizel, who then teamed up with journalist Danny Kelly, along with Dan Thompson (founder of computer game company Renegade Software) and Simon Morris, a former marketing director of BSkyB and ex-footballer and TV presenter Andy Gray, who also wrote a regular column. In an interview with Rolling Stone magazine in 2012, Tabizel stated that the website was named after a phrase oft used by his mother, Sandy, who would lambast him with "Its football 365 (days per year) with you!" In 1999, the height of the dot-com bubble, the site's former parent company 365 Corporation floated on the London Stock Exchange, peaking at a value of £500 million shortly after launch. In 2006, Sky UK took ownership of Football365 as part of its £96m purchase of 365 Media Group In 2015, Football365 transferred to Planet Sport Ltd based in Leeds.

== Regular features ==
- F365 Mailbox: A twice-daily collection of e-mails sent in by readers from Monday to Friday, some of which are not related to football.
- F365 Forum: The website provides the F365 Forum for readers to discuss the sport.
- Mediawatch: A satirical daily review of recent stories and articles from various national newspapers and football websites.
- Winners And Losers: A review of the Premier League's weekend's action and that of the Champions League action.
- Big Weekend/Big MidWeek: A preview feature for the coming weekend's games (or the mi-week games if any).
- 16 Conclusions: Sixteen conclusions derived from the matches amongst the so-called Big Six.
- The Cheeky Punt: An offbeat betting preview feature.
- F365 Says: Writers and contributors to the website give their opinions on recent footballing news, including in-house writers Sarah Winterburn, Matt Stead, Joe Williams, Ian Watson and Will Ford, in addition to columnists John Nicholson, Seb Stafford Bloor, Steven Chicken and Daniel Storey.
- Gossip: An update of transfer gossip featuring F365 contributors and public comments.
- Live: A real-time feed of live fixtures

== Internet TV channel ==
The website also had an internet TV channel, F365 TV. Among the programmes broadcast were The Paper Round and The Dugout Podcast - an irreverent fortnightly football show that is available from Thursdays to Mondays on Football365, Teamtalk and iTunes. Presenters included Don Dealio, Ed Draper, Kait Borsay and Lynsey Hooper.

== Regional variants ==
=== France ===
Founded in 1998 by Axel Dreyfus and Pierre Sivel under the name C Sport, and bought in 1999 by 365 Corp, then in 2001 by the Groupe Sporever group, Football365.fr is a site entirely dedicated to football news. Live news, match reports, interviews, live footage: the site has both a large number of videos, a blog service, and the option for readers to provide feedback.

The staff consists of six permanent journalists, helped by the staff of Sport365.fr. Nicolas Puiravau, editor in chief of the site since June 2004, has recently stated in Sport Strategy that the Football365 site gets more than 2 million unique visitors and 65 million page views per month.
