= Monday Night Football (British TV programme) =

Football television series, broadcast on Sky Sports

- Presented by: David Jones
- Opening theme: Fluke – "Absurd - Whitewash Edit"
- Country of origin: United Kingdom

Production
- Production locations: Studio 4, Sky Studios; Osterley, London (2017–present)
- Camera setup: Multi-camera
- Running time: Variable

Original release
- Network: Sky Sports
- Release: 17 August 1992 – 7 May 2007
- Release: 16 August 2010 – present

Related
- Super Sunday

Monday Night Football (MNF) is a British football programme on Sky Sports which broadcasts live English football from the Premier League.

== Original run ==
Sky television's acquisition of rights to broadcast live Premier League football from the start of the 1992–93 season saw them attempt innovations such as digital on-screen graphics (DOG) and Monday night live games. The first Monday Night Football game broadcast was between Manchester City and Queens Park Rangers on 17 August 1992, which ended in a 1–1 draw. To give the broadcasts a different look to Sky's Super Sunday strand, the broadcaster introduced the "Sky Strikers", a dance troupe similar to American cheerleaders. This pre-match and half-time entertainment was dropped after the first season.

The show had a number of different formats after its launch. The first change led to the merging of Andy Gray's Boot Room format into the show; analysing the previous weekend's football matches utilising the latest computer technology combined with Gray's individual analysis. As the UEFA Champions League gained in importance for Premier League clubs, the number of games played on Monday night declined. Sky Sports then reverted to a format similar to that of Ford Super Sunday with a presenter (Jeff Stelling) and studio guests.

In 2004–05, the analysis section was then incorporated into an additional programme shown after Ford Super Sunday, called Ford Super Sunday: The Last Word.

The show went on hiatus after the 2006–07 season when Setanta and subsequently ESPN obtained the rights for Monday night Premier League games.

== Current run ==
Monday Night Football returned from the 2010–11 season after Sky regained the rights to Monday night Premier League games. The games broadcast kick off at 20:00 on Monday nights. The show also started broadcasting in high-definition. Due to the structure of the broadcasting packages for the three seasons 2010–11 to 2012–13), Sky broadcast a minimum of twelve live Premier League games on Monday nights.

Before the departures of Richard Keys and Andy Gray, the programme had a different appearance to Super Sunday, presented by Keys and Gray from a purpose-built studio with Gray's analysis also returning from its Sunday evening slot. After the pair's unscheduled departure from Sky in January 2011, the first half-hour of analysis was dropped, and for the remainder of the season the show was presented from the stadium in largely the same format as Sunday or midweek Premier League matches, with a rotation of presenters and pundits, although the Monday Night Football graphics and branding were retained.

Ed Chamberlin was given the presenting role for the 2011–12 season, with Gary Neville as the new analyst. The show also returned to its previous format in the purpose-built analysis studio, with Chamberlin and Neville carrying out the same roles as Keys and Gray the previous season.

In 2013, following his retirement from professional football, Jamie Carragher joined the Monday Night Football show, to form a regular three-man line-up alongside Chamberlin and Neville. The first Monday Night Football of the 2013–14 season, and Carragher's first appearance, aired on 19 August 2013 with the Manchester City against Newcastle United game. Manchester City won the game 4–0.

Following Neville's appointment as interim head coach of Valencia in December 2015, he left the show to focus on his managerial duties. After leaving Valencia in March 2016 due to a poor run of results, Neville's return to Sky in his previous role was confirmed on 10 August 2016, ahead of the 2016–17 football season; he made his on-air return on 14 August, although from there on he would not appear on every MNF, with some episodes instead involving special guests such as Roy Keane and Thierry Henry appear alongside Carragher.

In 2016 David Jones took over the role of presenter after Chamberlin had left Sky to host ITV's horse racing coverage.

During the 2020–21 season, when fans were not allowed to attend matches due to the COVID-19 pandemic, Monday Night Football was occasionally extended to broadcast two matches, one at 18:00 and another at 20:15.

In 2023, Sky Sports confirmed there would be a new studio for Monday Night Football to develop the programme. This featured more analysis, a new regular pundit of Karen Carney joining Jamie Carragher and Gary Neville, and a new earlier start time of 18:30.

== Naming ==
1992–2016 : Ford Monday Night Football

From its launch on August 17, 1992 to May 2016, the programme was known as Ford Monday Night Football [with the exception of the 1994/1995 and 1995/1996 seasons when the programme was titled Ford Escort Monday Night Football] and was sponsored by Ford, in a partnership between the American motor company and Sky Sports that ran for 24 years.

2016–present Monday Night Football

Following the end of Ford's association with Sky Sports' coverage of the Premier League, the company's name was dropped from the programme's title in 2016 alongside three of Sky Sports' live Premier League programming titles named under the company's name (e.g. "Ford Super Sunday, "Ford Football Special and "Ford Saturday Night Football Live"), with the show simply being known as Monday Night Football.

== Presenters ==
- 1992–2003, 2010–2011: Richard Keys
- 1995-2003, 2010-2011: Andy Gray
- 2003–2005: Ian Payne
- 2005–2007: Jeff Stelling
- 2011–2016: Ed Chamberlin
- 2016–present: David Jones

== Pundits ==
- Jamie Carragher (Primary pundit)
- Gary Neville (Main secondary pundit)
- Karen Carney (Main secondary pundit)
- Thierry Henry (Frequent secondary pundit)
- Roy Keane (Frequent secondary pundit)
- Frank Lampard (Two shows, 2015 and 2016)
- Roberto Martinez (Three shows, 2015, 2018 and 2025)
- Brendan Rodgers (One show, 2016)
- Jurgen Klopp (One show, 2016)
- Ryan Giggs (One show, 2016)
- Claudio Ranieri (One show, 2017)
- Alan Pardew (One show, 2017)
- Craig Bellamy (One show, 2017)
- Wayne Rooney (Two shows, 2018 and 2022)
- Graeme Souness (One show, 2018)
- Rafael Benítez (One show, 2019)
- Micah Richards (One show, 2020)
- Mauricio Pochettino (One show, 2020)
- Eddie Howe (One show, 2020)
- Rob Green (One show, 2021)
- Chris Coleman (One show, 2021)
- Mark Hughes (One show, 2021)
- Steph Houghton (One show, 2021)
- Dominic Calvert-Lewin (One show, 2021)
- Kiernan Dewsbury-Hall (One Show, 2026)
- Dean Ashton (One Show, 2026)
- Edwin Van Der Sar (One Show, 2026)
- Jimmy Floyd Hasselbaink (One Show, 2026)
