= Mike Wedderburn =

English rugby union player, cricketer & broadcaster

- Born: 28 March 1964 (age 61); Portsmouth, England
- Education: Portsmouth Grammar School
- Occupations: News presenter; Sports presenter
- Notable work: Channel 4; Good Morning Sports Fans; Sky Sports News; Sky Sports
- Relatives: Jim Wedderburn

Michael Anthony Wedderburn (born 28 March 1964) is an English sports presenter for Sky Sports, primarily on Sky Sports News' Good Morning Sports Fans since 1998. He formerly played rugby union for Harlequins and Wasps, and cricket for Hampshire's 2nd XI.

== Early life and sports career ==
Mike Wedderburn was born in Portsmouth, Hampshire, on 28 March 1964. He was educated at Portsmouth Grammar School. He played cricket as a fast bowler for Hampshire, making four appearances in the Second Eleven Championship in 1983 and 1984. He also played rugby union for Harlequins and Wasps before an injury ended his career. He appeared for Harlequins in their 1991–92 Pilkington Cup Final defeat against Bath. He gained a degree in English Literature before completing an MSc in Sports Science at Loughborough University. Of Barbadian descent, his brother Jim Wedderburn won a bronze medal in athletics representing the British West Indies at the 1960 Summer Olympics.

== Media career ==
Wedderburn began his career as a sports presenter with Channel 4 before moving to the BBC, where he worked on Rugby Special, Sportsnight and Grandstand. In 1997 he became international rugby reporter for ITV. He joined Sky Sports at the launch of Sky Sports News in 1998, and has been a regular anchor on the channel's breakfast programme Good Morning Sports Fans since then. He formerly presented the programme along with Alex Hammond until she left in 2018 to join Sky Sports Racing. During the 2007 Cricket World Cup, Wedderburn presented the daily World Cup Report on Sky Sport News.

== Personal life ==
Wedderburn is a lifelong supporter of Manchester City F.C. and the West Indies cricket team. He plays keyboard in a ten-piece covers band called Jivehoney. He has played for Banbury Twenty Cricket Club in Oxfordshire.
