= Admiral Sportswear =

British athletic equipment company

Admiral
- Product type: Sportswear Apparel Sports Equipment
- Current owner: Admiral Sportswear Ltd.
- Country: England
- Markets: Worldwide
- Previous owners: Cook and Hurst (1914)
- Tagline: "Worn by Champions"
- Website: admiralsports.com
- Founded: 1914; 112 years ago by Cook & Hurst Ltd.
- Headquarters: Altrincham, Manchester

Admiral is an English sportswear brand, with a manufacturing emphasis on clothing for association football. Founded in 1914 in Leicester, Admiral is one of the oldest sports brands in the UK and was originally an undergarment brand but switched to the manufacture of apparel for sports that have included cricket, cycling and athletics, as well as football. The Admiral logo was formally registered with the trademark office on 6 September 1922. The company reached the peak of its success in the 1970s, 1980s and early 1990s through a series of football team sponsorships.

Some of the teams most notably sponsored by Admiral were the England national team, Rangers, Leeds United, Manchester United, Wolves, Kerala Blasters and some teams of the now-defunct NASL.

The Admiral brand was resurrected by a Manchester firm established by a local entrepreneur, Admiral Sportswear Ltd., which in 2011 acquired rights to manufacture and market footwear, clothing and accessories.

== History ==
=== Beginning ===
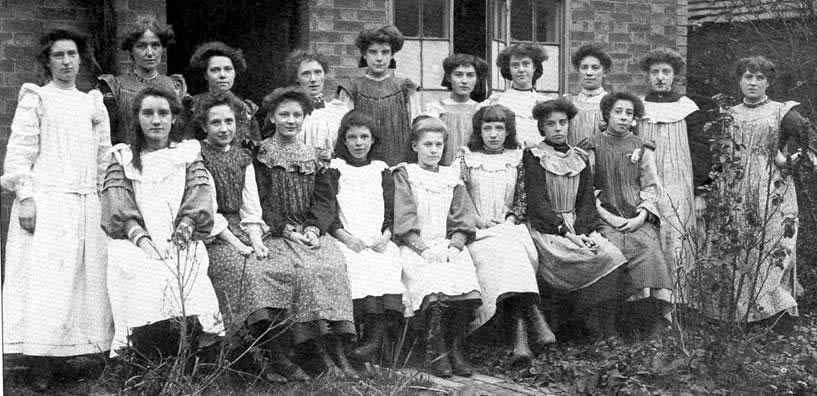
Female workers of the Cook & Hurst factory, photographed c. 1914

"Cook & Hurst Ltd.", a Leicester-based manufacturing company of underwear established by Christopher Cook and Harold Hurst in Wigston in 1908, created the 'Admiral' trademark in 1914 to brand their products. When England won the World Cup in 1966, Bert Patrick, the owner of Cook & Hurst Ltd, commenced manufacturing and marketing football kits. The kits sales were aimed at the juvenile market and through selling connections in the sports retail trade. Bert Patrick believed that the advent of coloured television would enable him to persuade football clubs to accept personalised kits which his designers would produce and then register them under the Design Copyright Act. There was stiff opposition to his ideas from all sections of the public.

=== 1970s: Leeds and England ===
Through its connection with Leeds United, Admiral pioneered the introduction and development of the replica kit market in the UK. In the 1973–74 season, Leeds United wore the first visibly branded kit in the English top flight.

Realising the potential of the replica kit market, Admiral brokered a deal with the Football Association in 1974 to produce the first commercially available England shirt that featured a sportswear manufacturers logo. They agreed a five-year contract for a starting payment of £15,000 a year or a 10 per cent royalty.

=== 1970s: Other clubs ===
Admiral signed up other big clubs alongside Leeds United, such as Manchester United, Coventry City, Portsmouth, Tottenham Hotspur, Southampton, and West Ham. It also developed outside England, signing sides Aberdeen, Dundee and Motherwell in Scotland, Yugoslavian club Red Star Belgrade, Bundesliga outfit Eintracht Frankfurt, the Italian clubs Bologna and Monza, the Swiss club Servette, Swedish club Malmö, the Iranian club Rastakhiz Khorramshahr and the Indian club Kerala Blasters, in addition to the national teams of Belgium, Saudi Arabia and Wales. Admiral also produced kits for many of the NASL teams during the late 1970s and early 1980s, and had a replica licensing deal with some clubs, and for two seasons produced the uniforms for every team in the MISL.

=== 1980s: Decline and rebirth ===
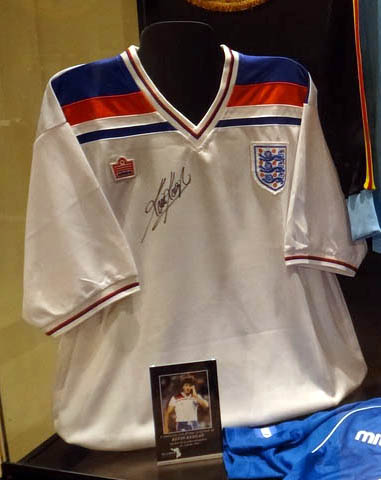
A signed Admiral England jersey exhibited in Spain. This model was worn from 1980 to 1983

Admiral began the decade with the launch of a new England kit in 1980, the first new kit in nearly 6 years. This kit was first worn in a 3–1 win over Argentina at Wembley Stadium on 13 May, and lasted until 1983. However, the 1980s marked a period of decline for the Admiral brand, as it began to lose the contracts with the major clubs to domestic rival Umbro and new international entrant Adidas.

Even though Admiral still held the England kit contract, one of the most valuable in the world, the company was declared bankrupt in 1982. The brand reappeared on the market for the 1983–84 season producing the same double pinstripe design for both Leicester City and Notts County. Towards the end of the 1980s Bradford City, Cardiff City, Crystal Palace, Hull City, Swansea City and Wrexham were added to the Admiral roster.

=== 1990s ===
Admiral entered the 1990s well placed to build upon its widespread recognition and continued to supply clubs including Dynamo Kyiv, Southampton, Middlesbrough, Bradford City, Charlton Athletic, Wimbledon, Hearts, Motherwell, Rangers, Partizan Belgrade and many more. In 1992 after Leeds United had won the last Football League division One title before the advent of the Premier League they negotiated a deal to make their kits for the following season.

After a period of relative inactivity during the mid-1990s, the Admiral trademark was acquired by Hay & Robertson plc in 1997, and ownership was transferred to International Brand Licensing plc in a demerger in 2002.

=== 2000 ===
In 2000, Admiral entered the world of cricket and was the official kit supplier to the England cricket team until 2008 (the sponsorship was then taken over by Adidas). By 2001, it had also become the kit supplier to the West Indies and South Africa cricket teams as well as supplying the Canadian team for the 2003 Cricket World Cup held in South Africa. However, Admiral kept its connection with English football by sponsoring Leeds United until the end of the 2007–08 season.

=== 2010 ===
In the 2010s, Admiral continued to sponsor a number of football teams around the world.

In 2011, Admiral Sportswear Limited acquired the rights of the Admiral trademark for most of Europe, the Middle East and North Africa, with the intention of revitalizing the heritage sports brand.

In 2016, Wimbledon won promotion to EFL League One wearing Admiral. This is the highest position the club has held in the football league. In Italy Cisalfa Sport have the exclusive licence to retail Admiral Performance and Essentials.

As part of the regeneration project Admiral started to work and collaborate with different design partners. The first of these was with Represent, shown at the 2019 Milan Fashion Week.

=== 2020 ===
In September 2020, the Admiral Sporting Goods Co. line was launched. The line, which took inspiration from pre-1966 sportswear, was composed of t-shirts, hoodies, and accessories.

Also that year, the company together with Wellgosh made a special common release. In the same year Admiral released a special project with The Jam and The Style Council.

In 2022 Admiral entered into a long-term partnership with ProDirect Sport, becoming the exclusive supplier of cricket and football teamwear throughout the UK and Ireland. Following, the deal Admiral launched a teamwear deal with Walthamstow FC and William Morris Gallery. The shirt was widely regarded as one of the best kit launches of the year and eventually won the D&AD Wood Pencil for Printed Graphics

Since 2022/23 season, Jubilo Iwata has becomes a contracted football team of Admiral Sportswear.

Following the success of multiple music partnerships, Admiral and Bob Marley launched a special release in connection with the Bob Marley: One Love reissuing the iconic tracksuit worn during the Battersea Park football matches.

To celebrate the 50th anniversary of Admiral inventing the replica football shirt, a limited edition book was produced by publisher Halcyon Publishing. The book launch was hosted in London with panelist Hayley McQueen hosting the event. The book received widely positive reviews from The Guardian, Hypebeast, FourFourTwo among others.

On the first day of the UEFA Women's Euro 2025, Admiral released a special edition football shirt with the Spice Girls to celebrate a summer of festivals and football.
