= Jo Wilson =

Jo Wilson may refer to:

- Jo Wilson, a fictional character from the television series Grey's Anatomy
- Jo Wilson (presenter), Scottish television presenter
