= David Jones (presenter) =

English sports presenter

David Jones is an English sports presenter working for Sky Sports and formerly a non-executive director of Sunderland A.F.C. He currently fronts the live coverage on Super Sunday and Monday Night Football.

Jones went to Stokesley Comprehensive School in North Yorkshire. He became a presenter on Sky Sports News in February 2003 after spending two seasons as a pitch-side reporter on Premiership Plus. Starting his journalistic career as a news reporter on the Derbyshire Times in Chesterfield, he joined Sky for the launch of Sky Sports News in 1998, presenting alongside Georgie Thompson for a number of years. Jones presented The Football League on Sky Sports from the 2007–08 season until 2011. He started presenting live Premier League matches in 2010.

Starting in 2012, Jones was announced as the host of The Footballers' Football Show, a programme which discusses the key football issues of the week. In June 2013, Sky Sports announced a brand new show for the 2013–14 season called Saturday Night Football, for their coverage of 5.30pm Saturday evening Premier League fixtures. The show was presented by Jones alongside Jamie Redknapp with an audience of football fans debating current football issues. The audience was later dropped but Jones and Redknapp continued to host the show until Sky lost the rights for the Saturday evening matches in 2016.

Jones became the main football presenter on Sky Sports in August 2016 after the departure of Ed Chamberlin to host ITV's coverage of horse racing. Jones now presents the flagship Super Sunday and Monday Night Football programmes alongside pundits such as Jamie Carragher, Micah Richards, Roy Keane and Gary Neville. When Sky Sports launched their new week nightly football discussion programme The Debate in August 2017, Jones hosted the first show.

In addition to this, Jones was heavily involved with Sky Sports' live UEFA Champions League coverage and has presented numerous live England international matches.

Jones became a non-executive director of Oxford United on 11 February 2015. After manager Michael Appleton left to take up a role with Leicester City, he was part of the three-man panel to find the next Oxford United manager in June 2017. The club ultimately appointed Pep Clotet, the former Swansea and Leeds assistant manager. On 18 December 2019, Jones was announced as a new non-executive director of Sunderland.

== Personal life ==
He is a fan of Sunderland. He took part in The Match on Sky1, playing at Newcastle United's St James' Park stadium.

== Sources ==
- www.officialdavidjones.com
