= Bryan Swanson =

British sports journalist

Bryan Swanson (born 1980 in Edinburgh, Scotland) is a former Chief News Reporter at Sky Sports News.

== Biography ==
In July 2021, Swanson announced that he would be leaving Sky Sports News after 18 years with the channel. He tweeted, "Today is my final day at Sky Studios, before leaving the company next week, rounding off an incredible 18-year journey," and confirmed that he was joining FIFA as Director of Media Relations.

In November 2022, he came out as gay.
