= Tom Chadwick =

English cricketer (born 1991)

Personal information
- Full name: Thomas Robert Chadwick
- Born: 21 October 1991 (age 35); Norwich, Norfolk, England
- Batting: Right-handed
- Bowling: Right-arm medium

Domestic team information
- Years: Team
- 2011–2013: Oxford University

Career statistics
Competition	First-class
Matches	3
Runs scored	37
Batting average	9.25
100s/50s	–/–
Top score	21
Catches/stumpings	2/–
- Source: Cricinfo, 16 February 2020

Thomas Robert Chadwick (born 21 October 1991) is an English former first-class cricketer.

Chadwick was born at Norwich in October 1991. He was educated in North Yorkshire at Stokesley School, before going up to Worcester College, Oxford. While studying at Oxford, Chadwick made three first-class appearances in The University Match for Oxford University between 2011 and 2013. He scored 37 runs in his three matches, with a high score of 21.
