= David Tabizel =

English entrepreneur and writer (born 1965)

- Born: January 1965 (age 61)
- Education: University of East Anglia
- Occupations: Entrepreneur; Writer
- Known for: Founder of Football365

David Tabizel (born January 1965) is an internet and media entrepreneur, who was the co-founder of a number of successful technology startups such as 365 Corporation (Football 365, Rugby 365 etc.), Demon Internet, Autonomy, Rage Software, Durlacher (now Panmure Gordon) and others.

He graduated from the University of East Anglia in 1986 in economics where he now sits on the advisory board and subsequently became a behavioral economist and analyst with a specialism in the economic application of existential psychology to predict trends in industries such as technology, finance and media.

He was also involved in the forming and founding of Metrodome Film in the UK and in Ginger Media's purchase of Virgin Radio in the late 1990s. He also purchased Laughing Stock, Europe's leading comedy record label in the mid-1990s, a company whose artists included Eddie Izzard, Bill Hicks, Peter Cook & Dudley Moore, Rowan Atkinson and Arnold Brown.

Tabizel is credited with writing one of the first books on the Internet in 1991 and also wrote an influential work anticipating the Internet boom of the 1990s in "The Internet an Investment Perspective" (Financial Publications Ltd 1994). Tabizel wrote an exhaustive study of the video games industry in 1993. Three of the companies co-formed by Tabizel, Durlacher, 365 Corporation and Autonomy each achieved stock market capitalizations in excess of $1 billion. Eckoh PLC a spin-off from 365 Corporation is now a London stock market quoted telecoms company.

Tabizel led the research and corporate finance efforts at Durlacher, creating a technology and media based research driven investment bank with a peak stock market value of approximately $4 billion during the peak of the dotcom boom in 2000 & is now actively involved in researching emerging trends in technology.

He was the founder of VideoJug, the instructional video educational website, which had produced approximately 60,000 original how-to films by June 2010. Videojug specialised in making food films and Tabizel has stated that his next project will involve food technology, TV and media.

Although low-profile, he did give a rare in depth interview in 1995 to the Independent Newspaper and has also given occasional interviews to the Wall Street Journal, the Daily Express, Sunday Times and Newsweek. He is also known to invest and participate in a number of media and ecommerce enterprises, particularly those involving Internet, food and/or comedy. Tabizel's stakes include holdings in Rentify.com and The Food Corporation as well as Spot.IM and Showbox. He is a founder, with television producer John Lloyd, of D5 Entertainment and is involved with UK food start-up Tabl Media. Tabizel is the biological son of fertility pioneer, biologist & PSI co-inventor Bertold P. Wiesner and is the half brother of the author Eva Ibbotson, comedian Simon Evans, film maker Barry Stevens, psychotherapist Paul Newham, David Gollancz the barrister and writer Michael Bywater.
