= Stokesley School =

Stokesley School & Sixth Form College

Location
- Station Road; Stokesley; North Yorkshire, TS9 5AL; England; 54.4675°N 1.1829°W

Information
- Type: Academy
- Motto: Being the best we can be
- Established: 1959
- Local authority: North Yorkshire Council
- Trust: Areté Learning Trust
- Department for Education URN: 141930 Tables
- Ofsted: Reports
- Head teacher: Michael Fenwick
- Gender: Coeducational
- Age: 11 to 18
- Colours: Year 7; Year 8; Year 9; Year 10; Year 11
- Website: www.stokesleyschool.org

Stokesley School is a coeducational secondary school and sixth form located in Stokesley, North Yorkshire, England.

It was established in 1959 as secondary modern school but became a comprehensive in the 1970s. The school converted to academy status in April 2015, however it continues to coordinate with North Yorkshire County Council for admissions, and has an intake of pupils from Stokesley, Great Ayton, Hutton Rudby, Nunthorpe and the surrounding villages.

Stokesley School offers GCSEs, BTECs, and ASDAN courses as programmes of study for pupils, while students in the sixth form have the option to study from a range of A-levels.

The last Ofsted report was June 2022 and was labelled 'Good'.

== Notable former pupils ==
- Joe Bennett, footballer
- Tom Chadwick, cricketer
- David Jones, sports broadcaster
- Maimie McCoy, actress
- Alistair McDowall, playwright
- Alan Milburn, politician
- Will Muir, rugby union player
- Pierce Phillips, rugby union player
- Harry and Charlie Tanfield, cyclists
