= Rob Wotton =

British sports presenter

Rob Wotton is a British television sports presenter. For 27 years, Wotton presented football topics for Sky Sports and on Sky Sports News. He was previously the sports editor at Capital Radio in London.

A fan of Chelsea FC, his commentary has appeared on their club DVD. Wotton has covered England games home and away for Capital Gold and worked with Jonathan Pearce.

== Career ==
Before beginning his long service at Sky, Wotton was the sports editor at Capital Radio in London, where Euro 96 and the 1998 World Cup in France were among the highlights, as well as annual broadcasts from Wimbledon.

=== Sky Sports ===
Wotton joined Sky Sports in 1998. A Chelsea fan, he presented a number of programmes for the network. His most regular role though was the early Saturday evening slot, where he takes the viewers through the Premier League talking points and Football League goals as soon as the Soccer Saturday team are off air.

Since joining Sky Sports News, Wotton presented a number of their frontline football productions, including several seasons as the anchor for their La Liga coverage and the weekly magazine show Revista de la Liga.

He also fronted Sky's Bundesliga coverage, Northern Irish football and Schoolboy internationals - as well as being part of Sky Sports News' team for Euro 2004 in Portugal. Away from football he has also worked on IndyCar coverage.

In 2025, Wotton left his role as a football presenter on Sky Sports, after fronting programmes for the network for 27 years. Wotton's departure, through voluntary redundancy, was part of a restructuring of the network that included the departure of seven of the network's broadcast team.
