= Andy Steggall =

British television presenter

Andy Steggall is the multimedia manager at the Ordnance Survey and a former television sports presenter, producer and filmmaker. He produced the South and West edition of the BBC regional football show Late Kick Off and has been working for Sky on several other projects. He runs two television production companies specialising in sport – Pergall Productions and Pergall Media. He has previously worked for TVS, Meridian, ITN, Setanta, Channel 4, Sunset + Vine, TWI and GMTV.

== Broadcasting career ==
Steggall began his broadcasting career in local radio at BBC Radio Leicester and then Centre Radio and Southern Sound. He started his television career as a reporter and presenter for TVS before working on The Channel 4 Daily and GMTV. He then presented sport and news for Meridian. He freelances as a presenter for Sky Sports News.

Steggall presented Ski Tips (ITV), a skiing magazine programme on ITV, for several years before he produced the last series. He fronted the series Conquer the Arctic (TWI/Channel 4). He was the reporter on a Channel 4 documentary about Shane Warne. He produced UcanDOit, a series of films about grassroots sport for Sky. He has also produced several programmes about golf for Sky and is working on a documentary about the history of the Professional Footballers' Association.

== Business interests ==
Steggall runs Pergall Media with Match of the Day commentators John Roder and Louis Browne, and a number of media training courses both on his own and in conjunction with other companies.

== In popular culture ==
Short-lived British Hardcore/Metal act Stegel named themselves after the television presenter, and released an EP titled 'Andy Steggall's Face'. Co-Presenter of the Riot Act Podcast, Stephen Hill, fronted the band for its entire existence.
