= Ed Draper =

Edward Draper also known as Teddy Draper (born June 1981 in Hackney, London) is a journalist, television presenter and radio broadcaster. He is best known for presenting for Sky News (sport) since 2010 and Sky Sports News since 2014. Previously he presented sports news on Absolute Radio (formerly Virgin Radio) Breakfast Show, as well as the station's Rock 'N' Roll Sport Podcast, on which he works with Russ Williams. He is also one of the main faces of Sky Sports News and has regularly appeared as a sports presenter for Sky News for over a decade.

Ed has written regular sports features for the Sky Sports website too, with special focus on boxing and MMA.

Ed hosted the in-house boxing shows at the London 2012 Olympics (on the big screen at The London Excel) and the track and field events at the London 2012 Paralympics.

From 2014, Ed has hosted a variety of live sports coverage for Matchroom TV, including boxing, golf, tenpin bowling and pool.

Ed produces and hosts the podcast Sport and Life: https://podcasts.apple.com/gb/podcast/sport-and-life/id1347584387

Ed formerly presented sports news for BBC Radio London, as well as providing sports commentary for MUTV and EuroSport.

His career began writing for the Logan Daily News in Ohio, USA in 2004 and Ed also worked for WOUB TV as a presenter (anchor) and reporter.

He joined Absolute Radio in September 2008-2012, Talk Sports February 2012-2013, and Joins Sky in 2014 called Sky sports News.
