= MUTV (Manchester United F.C.) =

Programming
- Picture format: (1080i, 16:9, MPEG-4, HDTV)

Ownership
- Owner: Manchester United

History
- Launched: September 10, 1998; 28 years ago

Links
- Website: manutd.com

MUTV is a premium television channel owned and operated by English football club Manchester United. The channel first broadcast on 10 September 1998.

MUTV offers Manchester United fans exclusive interviews with players and staff, full matches, including all Premier League games (broadcast generally at midnight of the day the match was played), live reserve and academy games and "classic" matches plus footballing news and other themed programming. The station also broadcasts live coverage of all of the team's pre-season friendly matches (including International Champions Cup).

When it was formed, the channel existed as a three-way joint venture between Manchester United, Granada Television and BSkyB. On 16 November 2007, ITV sold its 33.3% stake in MUTV to Manchester United. BSkyB followed suit on 22 January 2013, making MUTV 100% owned by Manchester United.

MUTV launched in high definition (HD) in July 2014 on the Sky platform in the United Kingdom and Ireland. MUTV is available in several Asia-Pacific countries on the beIN Sports Connect platform.

== Presenters and pundits ==
- Arthur Albiston
- Viv Anderson
- Wes Brown
- Andy Cole
- Siobhan Chamberlain
- Bojan Djordjic
- Ali Douglas
- Stewart Gardner
- Mandy Henry
- Sam Homewood
- Denis Irwin
- Lou Macari
- Helen Evans
- Sammy McIlroy
- Pien Meulensteen
- Andy Ritchie
- Sarah Stone
- David Stowell
- Mark Sullivan
- Mickey Thomas
- Niall McCaughan
- Ben Thornley

=== Former presenters ===
- Ally Begg
- Hayley McQueen
- Steve Bottomley
- Paul Anthony
- Joe Evans
- Mark Pearson
- Steve Bower
- Matt Cole
- Andrew Dickman
- Dan O'Hagan
- Stuart Pearson
- Bryan Swanson
- Andy Goldstein
- Jim Rosenthal
- Ally McCoist
- Paddy Crerand
- Gary Pallister
- Ron Atkinson

== Guests (ex-pros) ==
- Nicky Butt
- David May
- Wes Brown
