= Perth High School =

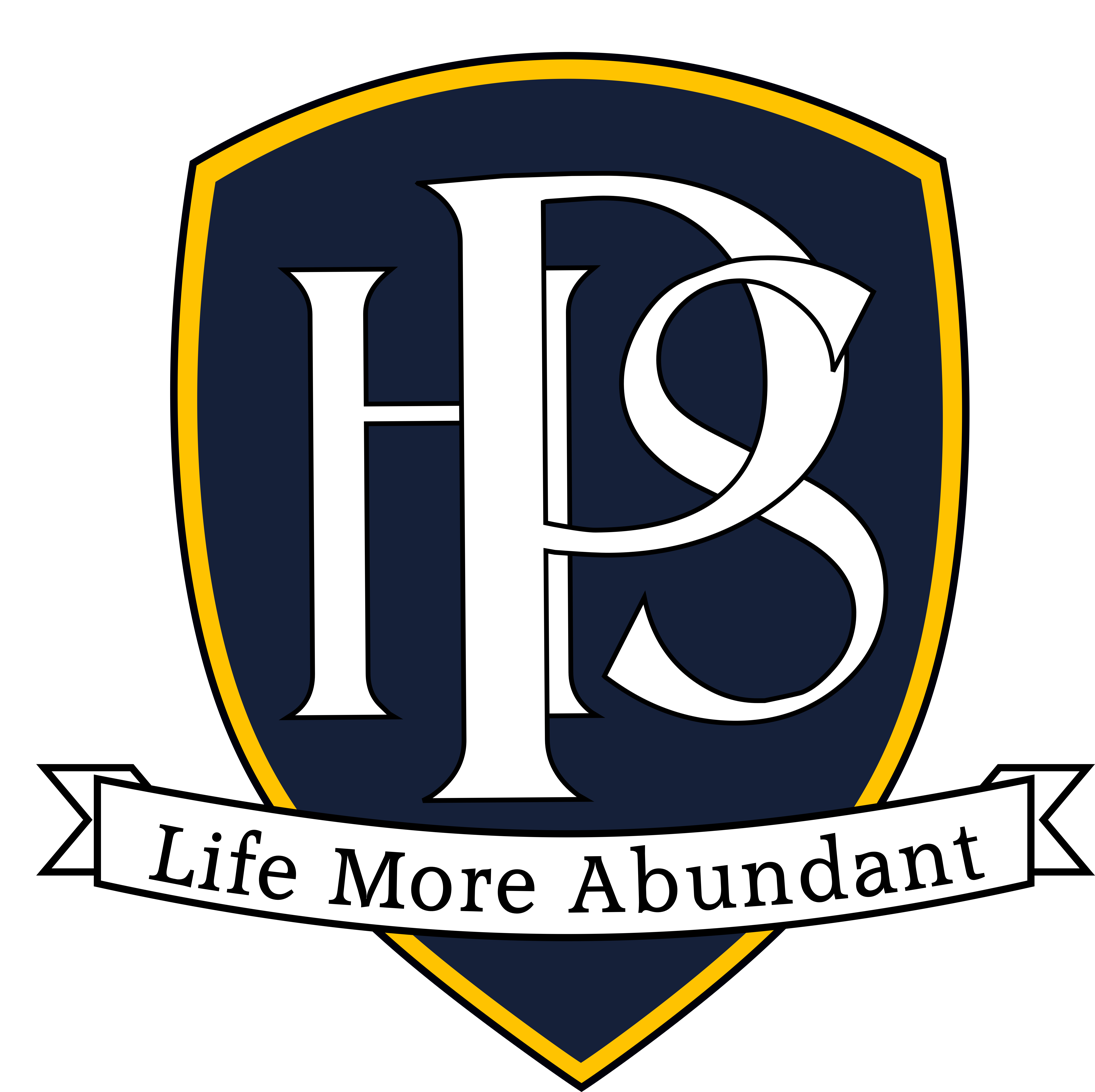

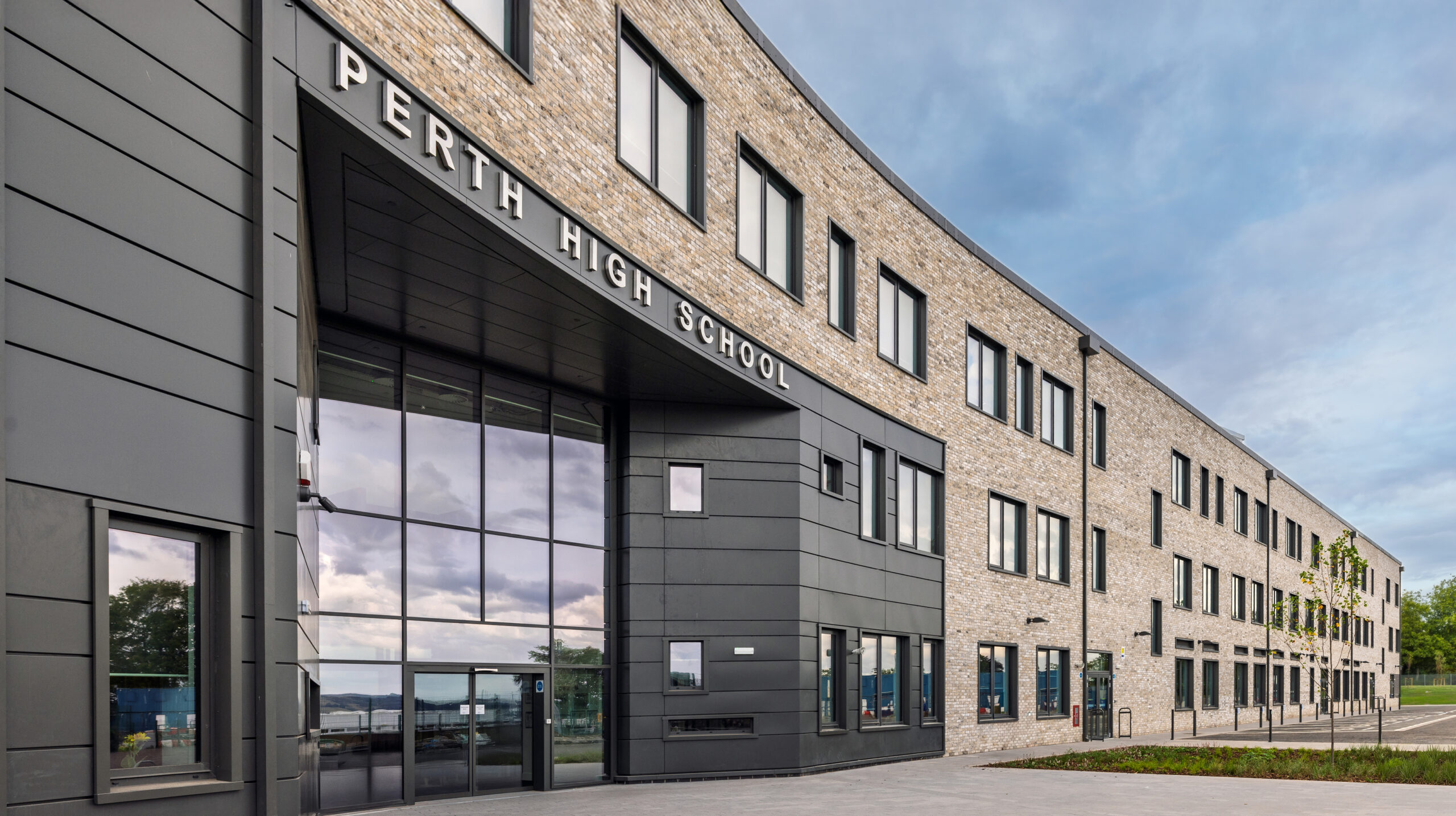
- The new Perth High School in 2025

Location
- Perth, Perth and Kinross; Scotland; 56.3925°N 3.4683°W

Information
- Type: Secondary school
- Motto: Life More Abundant
- Established: 1950
- Head teacher: Martin Shaw
- Enrollment: 1423 (as of September 2018)
- Houses: Kinfauns; Pitheavlis; Balmanno; Huntingtower; Elcho; Fingask
- Colours: Black, blue, yellow
- Website: [[www.perthhigh.pkc.sch.uk](http://www.perthhigh.pkc.sch.uk) www.perthhigh.pkc.sch.uk)]

Perth High School is a six-year, non-denominational comprehensive secondary school in Perth, Scotland. It is administered by Perth and Kinross Council and serves pupils from Perth and the surrounding area.

The school was established in 1950 at Gowans Terrace. It moved to its Oakbank Road campus in 1971, where it remained for more than fifty years. A replacement school building opened to pupils in August 2025, following construction work which began in February 2023.

The new building was designed to Passivhaus standards and has capacity for up to 1,600 pupils and 140 staff. It was built by Robertson Construction Tayside on behalf of hub East Central Scotland.

== History ==
Perth High School was established in 1950 at Gowans Terrace. The school received the secondary department of Caledonian Road School, which had previously operated as an infant, junior and senior school until that year. The original Perth High School buildings were post-war prefabricated structures, of a type that had not previously been used for a large school in Scotland.

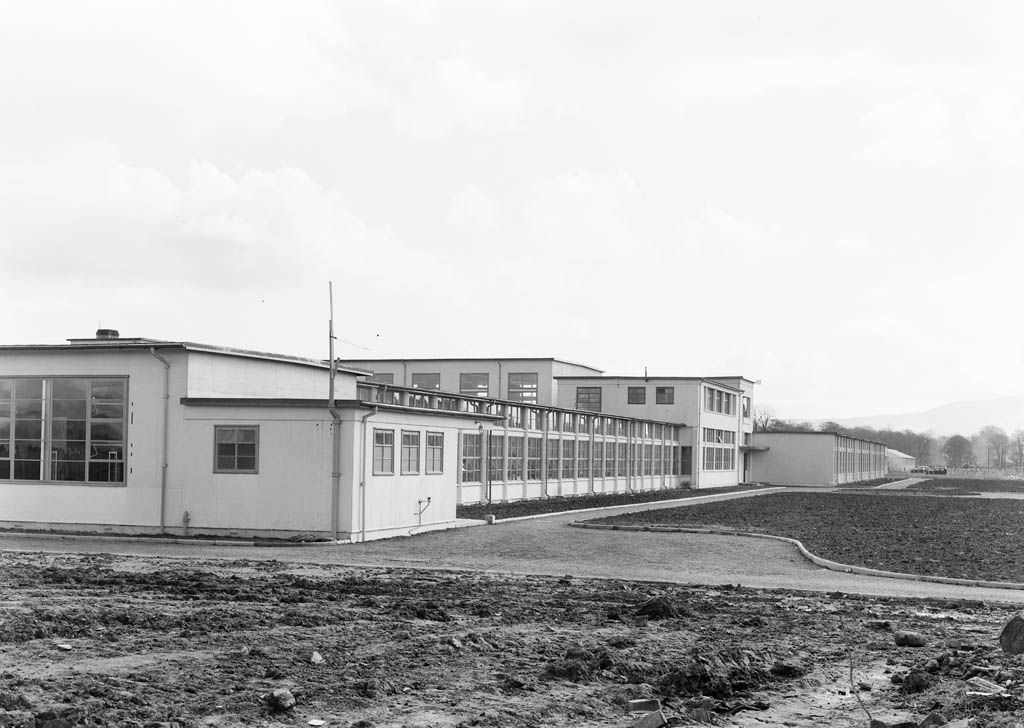
The original Perth High School buildings at Gowans Terrace.

In 1971, the school moved to a purpose-built campus on Oakbank Road in the west of Perth. The former Gowans Terrace site was later used by Perth Grammar School, which opened there in August 1971.

The Oakbank Road campus became the main home of Perth High School for more than five decades. It stood on an elevated site between Oakbank Road and Viewlands Road West, close to Oakbank Primary School. The campus was centred on a large multi-storey teaching block, with other teaching, social and sports facilities arranged around it.

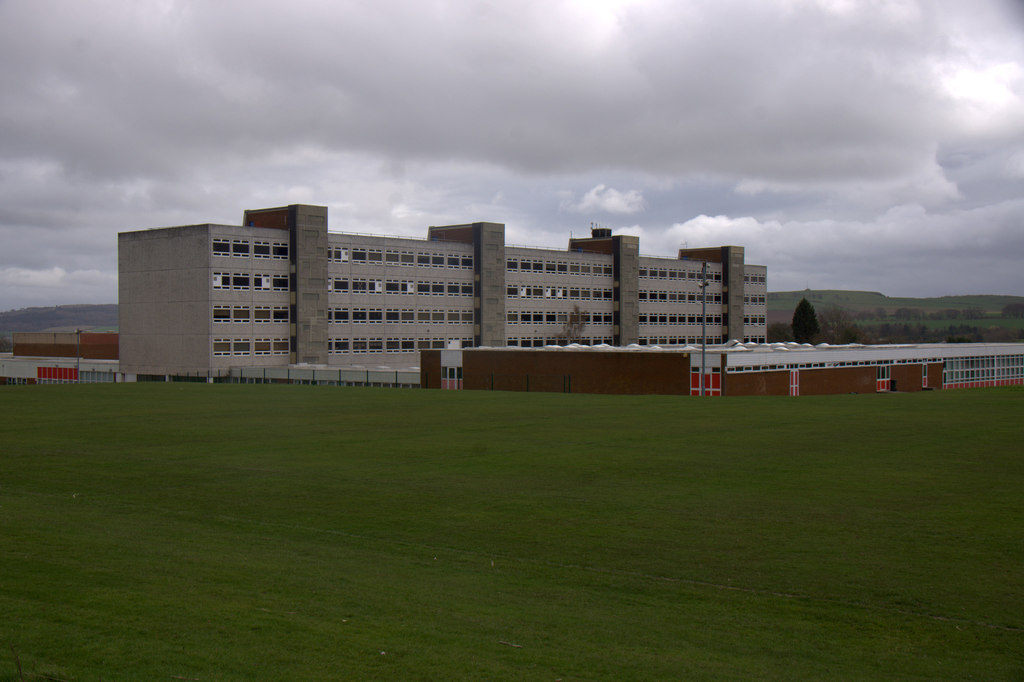
The 1971 Perth High School building before demolition.

The 1971 building was used by generations of pupils from the early 1970s until the end of the 2024–25 school year. During construction of the replacement school, the existing building remained in use while the new building was built on the adjacent playing fields.

An end-of-school open evening was held in June 2025 before the move to the new building. Former pupils and staff were invited to return to the 1971 campus before its closure.

The replacement Perth High School opened to pupils in August 2025. After the move, the former school building was scheduled for demolition as part of the second phase of the redevelopment, making way for new outdoor facilities including a 3G sports pitch, a multi-use games area, a cycle pump track and landscaping.

Thirza Pupillo, the school's first female headteacher, retired in August 2021 after serving in the post from 2016. She was succeeded by Martin Shaw, who became headteacher in August 2021.

== Replacement building ==
Plans for a replacement Perth High School were developed as part of Perth and Kinross Council's school estate programme. The project was delivered through hub East Central Scotland, with a reported capital value of £75.4 million and a gross internal floor area of 15,714 square metres. Preliminary works began in February 2023, with the new school built on the existing campus while the 1971 building remained in use.

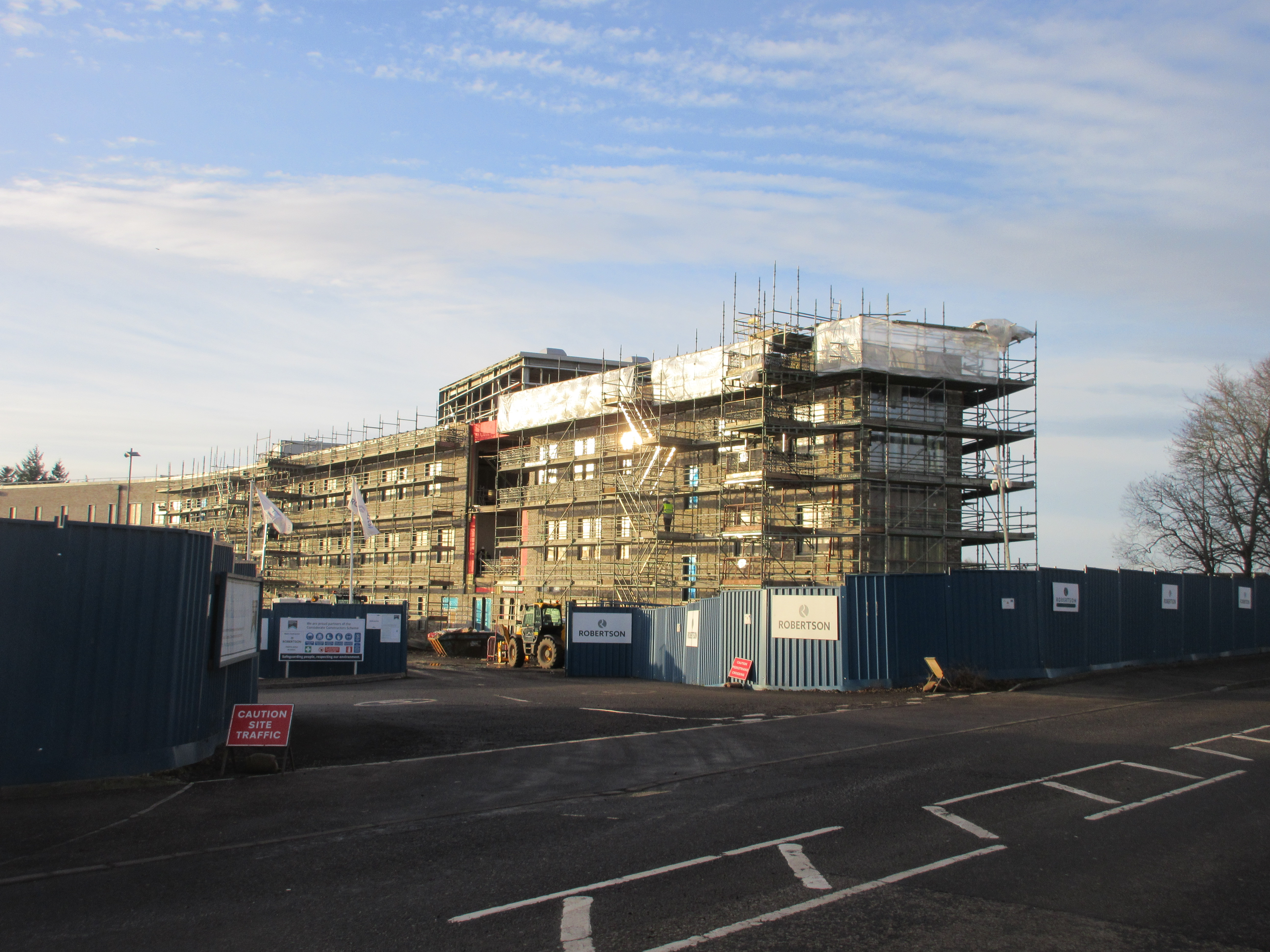
The replacement Perth High School building under construction.

The new building was designed by NORR and built by Robertson Construction Tayside. It was constructed over three storeys and designed to Passivhaus standards, with capacity for up to 1,600 pupils and 140 staff. The project was designed to meet the energy-performance requirements of the Scottish Government's Learning Estate Investment Programme Band A, with a target of 67–83 kWh/m²/annum.

The design includes a double-height entrance, classroom accommodation arranged around circulation cores, and larger flexible areas for shared use. The dining and social space was designed to be triple height in parts, with a connection to the external recreational area.

The new £80 million building opened to pupils in August 2025, after completion of the main construction work during the summer holidays. Staff returned to the new building on 18 August 2025, followed by two exceptional closure days on 19 and 20 August, before pupils returned on 21 August.

External works connected with the redevelopment were due to continue into 2026.

== Campus and facilities ==
Perth High School is located on an elevated site in the west of Perth, between Oakbank Road and Viewlands Road West. The school shares the wider education campus area with Oakbank Primary School.

=== 1971 building ===
From 1971 to 2025, Perth High School occupied a purpose-built campus on Oakbank Road. The school had previously been based at Gowans Terrace, which became the home of Perth Grammar School when Perth High School moved to Oakbank Road in 1971.

The 1971 campus stood on a prominent elevated site in the west of Perth and was centred on a large multi-storey teaching block, with other teaching, social and sports facilities arranged around it. It remained the main home of the school for more than five decades.

1971 Perth High School

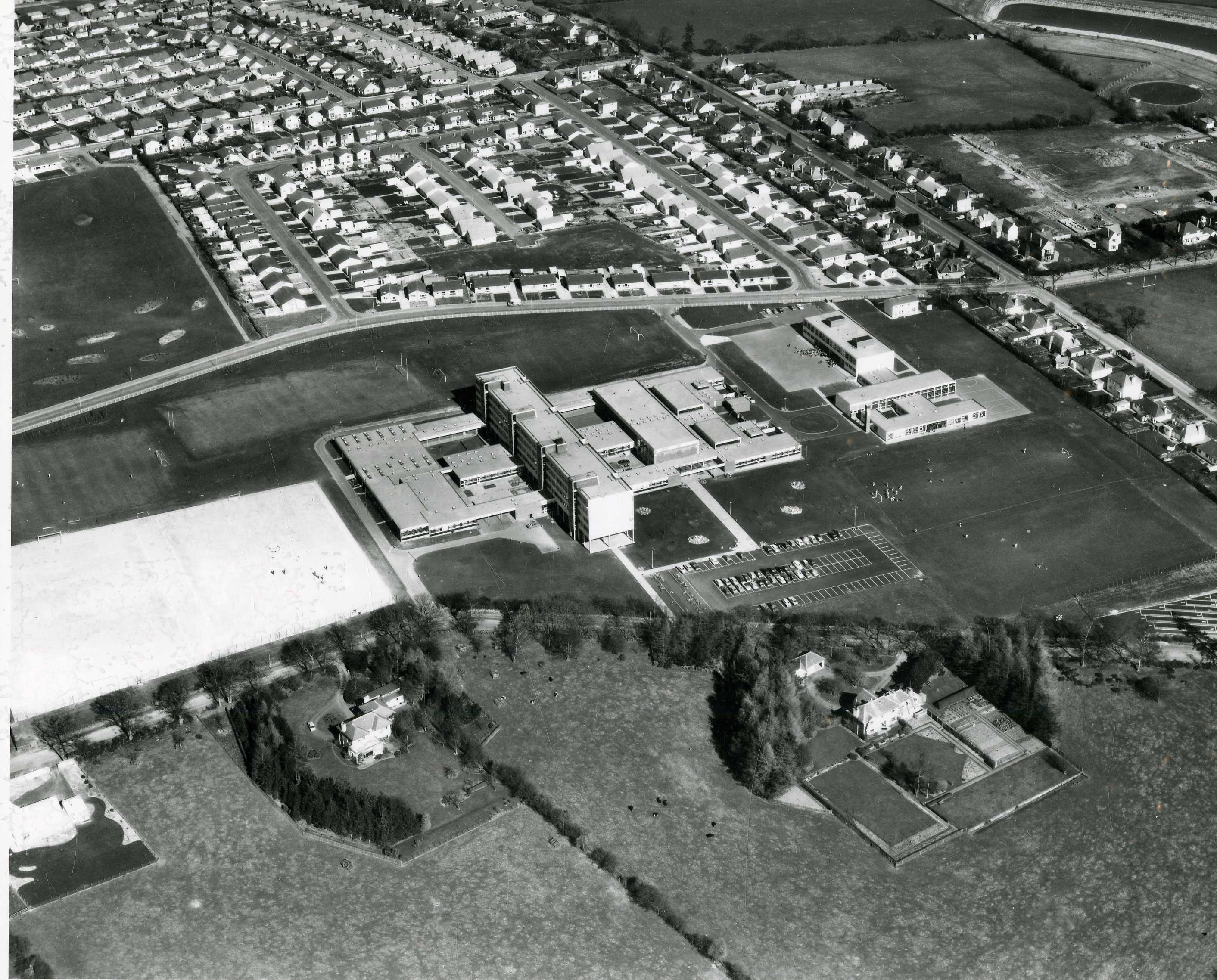
The Oakbank Road campus in 1972, shortly after the school moved from Gowans Terrace.

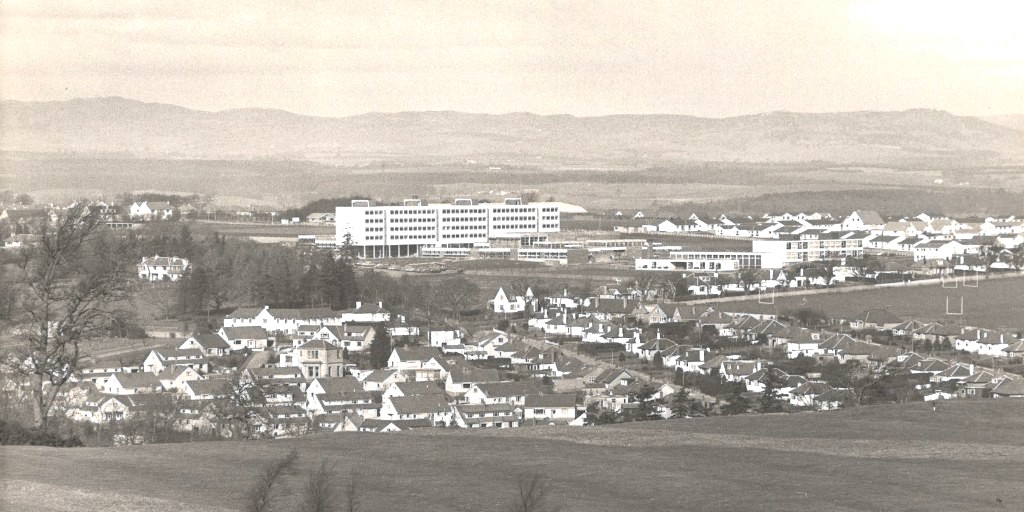
The Perth High School campus in 1977.

During construction of the replacement school, the 1971 building remained in use while the new building was constructed on the former playing fields adjacent to it. An end-of-school open evening was held in June 2025 before the move to the new building, with former pupils and staff invited to return to the 1971 campus before its closure.

=== New campus facilities ===
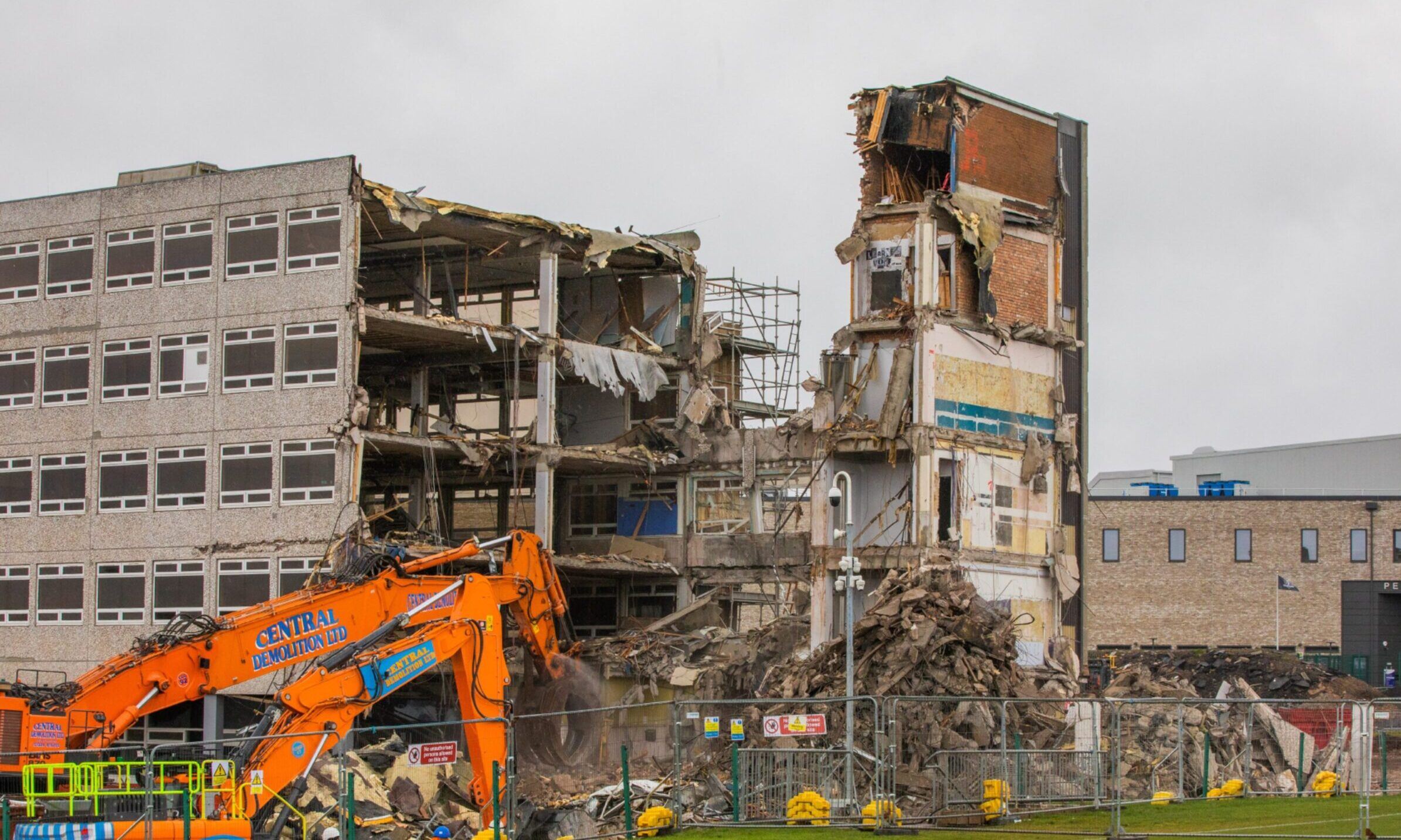
Demolition of the former Perth High School building.

The replacement building provides teaching accommodation across three floors. Facilities reported during the project included a double-height theatre, breakout spaces, indoor and outdoor dining areas, sports and arts equipment, technology and engineering workspaces, and fitted and loose furniture for 274 rooms.

The wider redevelopment includes hard and soft landscaping, parking facilities, sports pitches, a multi-use games area, a cycle pump track and the refurbishment of the existing sports block. Phase two of the project involved demolition of the former school building and the creation of new outdoor facilities.

Demolition of the former Perth High School building began after the new building opened. The demolition work was under way by April 2026.

== School organisation ==
The school is led by a Senior Leadership Team (SLT), also referred to as the Board of Studies, consisting of the headteacher, five depute headteachers and a business manager. Each depute headteacher has responsibility for a year group or stage of the school.

Perth High School has 16 teaching departments, managed by 18 principal teachers. The school also has a Pupil Support Team, including six Principal Teachers of Guidance, a principal teacher of Support for Learning, support for learning teachers and personal support teachers.

The school operates a house system made up of six houses: Kinfauns, Pitheavlis, Balmanno, Huntingtower, Elcho and Fingask. Each Principal Teacher of Guidance is responsible for a house group and maintains a pastoral relationship with pupils throughout their time at the school.

== Curriculum ==
Perth High School follows the Scottish Curriculum for Excellence. In S1 and S2, pupils study a broad general education including English and literacy, mathematics and numeracy, science, social subjects, modern languages, expressive arts, technologies, religious, moral and philosophical studies, and health and wellbeing.

During S2 and S3, pupils begin to personalise their curriculum in preparation for the senior phase. In S4, pupils normally choose seven subjects, including English and Mathematics. The school presents pupils for qualifications awarded by the Scottish Qualifications Authority, including National 1 to National 5 courses. In S5 and S6, Higher, Advanced Higher and National Progression Award courses are added to the available programme.

The school provides course-choice guidance through individual interviews with guidance staff. Pupils in S4 are also interviewed by Skills Development Scotland to support planning for employment, further study or continued education.

Perth High School also participates in Perth City Campus, a partnership involving the Perth city secondary schools and Perth College UHI. The programme allows pupils to access a wider range of courses than would normally be available within a single school.

== Student life ==
Perth High School provides a range of pupil services and activities outside normal classroom teaching. The school's student pages include information on the school library, school clubs, Pupil Press, digital learning, the school counsellor and supported study.

The school handbook lists a range of extra-curricular sports, delivered with support from Perth and Kinross Active Schools. These include athletics, badminton, basketball, dance, football, gymnastics, hockey, netball, rugby, swimming, table tennis and volleyball.

Other activities listed by the school include Pupil Parliament, debating, chess, book club, charity groups, PRISM, school orchestra, choir, drama, Duke of Edinburgh, environmental group, library group, Sign Club, Reading Ambassadors and Mental Health Ambassadors.

Pupil representation includes an S5/6 Head Team, senior prefects, pupil ambassadors, Pupil Parliament representatives, pupil voice groups, buddying activities and charity projects.

The school handbook states that pupils have opportunities to take part in trips ranging from day excursions and activity days to international travel, including France, South Africa and the United States. It also records links with schools in South Africa. In 2023, physics pupils from Perth High School received funding from Perth-based company Merlin ERD Ltd for a trip to CERN in Geneva.

Charity activity has included participation in Perth Parkrun in aid of Teenage Cancer Trust. In 2024, more than 400 pupils were reported to have signed up for the event, which was held in memory of former pupil Gavin Russell.

The school has also worked with local company Merlin ERD on careers and curriculum-related projects. A 2025 article published by Merlin stated that the company had supported Perth High School's Careers Festival in 2023/24 and 2024/25, and had donated or helped fund resources including wind turbines for Practical Electronics, Music Technology equipment, a laptop charging unit and start-up costs for a pupil-run café and barista facility.

== Inspection ==
In November 2018, Education Scotland inspected Perth High School. The inspection report, published in January 2019, rated the school "satisfactory" for leadership of change, learning, teaching and assessment, raising attainment and achievement, and ensuring wellbeing, equality and inclusion.

The report identified strengths including the school's Better Relationships Policy, the range of opportunities for pupils to develop skills through lunch-time and after-school activities, and the school's work with local, national and international partners. Areas for improvement included developing a clearer sense of direction for school improvement, reviewing the curriculum, improving consistency in learning experiences, and further developing staff professional learning around assessment, tracking and pupil support.

A follow-through progress report stated that the school and local authority had prepared an improvement plan after the inspection. The report said that Education Scotland was confident Perth High School had the capacity to continue to improve and that no further reports would be published in relation to the 2019 inspection.

== Catchment area ==
Perth High School serves pupils from Perth and the surrounding area. Its associated primary schools are Abernethy Primary School, Abernyte Primary School, Craigie Primary School, Errol Primary School, Inch View Primary School, Inchture Primary School, Invergowrie Primary School, Kinnoull Primary School, Longforgan Primary School, Moncreiffe Primary School, Oakbank Primary School and St Madoes Primary School.

== Notable alumni ==
- Elena Baltacha, tennis player
- Robin Brydone, curler
- Mike Crockart, politician
- Ann Gloag, businesswoman and charity campaigner, co-founder of Stagecoach Group
- Professor Beverley Glover, biologist
- Liam Gordon, footballer
- Colin McCredie, actor
- Gareth Morrison, actor
- Graham Phillips, journalist
- Sally Reid, actor
- Rory Skinner, motorcycle racer
- Andrew Stewart, Lord Ericht, Senator of the College of Justice
- Jo Wilson, television presenter
- David Wotherspoon, footballer
