= Good Morning Sports Fans =

- Also known as: Sky Sports Breakfast
- Opening theme: Sky Sports News theme
- Country of origin: United Kingdom
- Original language: English

Production
- Production locations: SSN Newsroom, Sky Studios, Osterley, London
- Camera setup: Multi-camera
- Running time: 180 minutes

Original release
- Network: Sky Sports News (1998–)
- Release: August 10, 1998 – present

Sky Sports Breakfast (formerly Good Morning Sports Fans) is a breakfast television show focusing on sports news and features, broadcast on Sky Sports News every day between 7 and 10 AM.

Good Morning Sports Fans had been a regular feature on the channel since Sky Sports News launched in October 1998. Initially contained broadcast show-specific features, such as a sports-focused weather forecast (presented by the Sky News Weather team), a Surfing Report, Alex Hammond's Tip Of The Day, and the sports stories in the day's newspapers but in more recent years the programme's format has been the same as for the rest of Sky Sports News output.

In August 2010, the show relaunched with a new look and in high-definition alongside the launch of Sky Sports News HD. The show was revamped in August 2011 with a new set and presenting lineup, including the return of Kirsty Gallacher.

Past theme music has included "Surface To Air" by The Chemical Brothers, and a version of Lux Aeterna.

On August 11, 2025, the programme was relaunched as Sky Sports Breakfast.
