= Hayley McQueen =

English TV presenter

- Born: 9 December 1979 (age 46); Manchester, England
- Occupation: Television presenter
- Years active: present
- Employer: Sky Sports
- Children: 1

Hayley McQueen (born 9 December 1979) is a British TV sports presenter, reporter, RTS award-winning producer, and event host. She is a lead anchor on Sky Sports News and the presenter of Scottish Premiership and Scottish Cup. Prior to that, she hosted Sky Sports' flagship Saturday evening Football First Premier League highlights show Match Choice.

McQueen is also an awards presenter and regularly hosts corporate events. Alongside her Sky work, she presented for Premier League TV worldwide and has appeared as a guest host on BBC 5 Live football phone-in show, as well as hosting duties for Radio X show The Kickabout, standing in for Johnny Vaughan. She is the former co-presenter of Sky Sports Champions League, as well as other Sky Sports football programming and once weekly Sportswomen programme.

== Early life ==
McQueen was born in 1979 in Manchester, and also lived in Scotland and Bangkok, before settling in Hutton Rudby in North Yorkshire in 1994.

== Television career ==
McQueen began her television career working as a runner and production assistant for Richard and Judy before joining the television channel of Middlesbrough's Boro TV as a reporter and producer. She then joined Middlesbrough FC's "Football in the Community" scheme before being head hunted by Sky Sports News where she became a presenter.

She also presented on Fox Sports. McQueen left Sky Television in December 2006 and took up a position on MUTV, where she was main match day anchor and presented and produced the news, daily talk and match day live build up and phone-in shows as well as conducting regular interviews with players past and present.

McQueen then hosted the Daily World Cup show for Al Jazeera Sports with Scott Minto throughout the 2010 tournament. She returned to Sky Sports in August 2010 as they launched Sky Sports News in HD.

== Personal life ==
McQueen is the daughter of former footballer Gordon McQueen.

She was engaged to German-born model and actor Kirk Newmann in 2018. She gave birth to a daughter on 3 October 2019.

She supports Manchester United.
