= Jamie Carragher =

English footballer and analyst (born 1978)

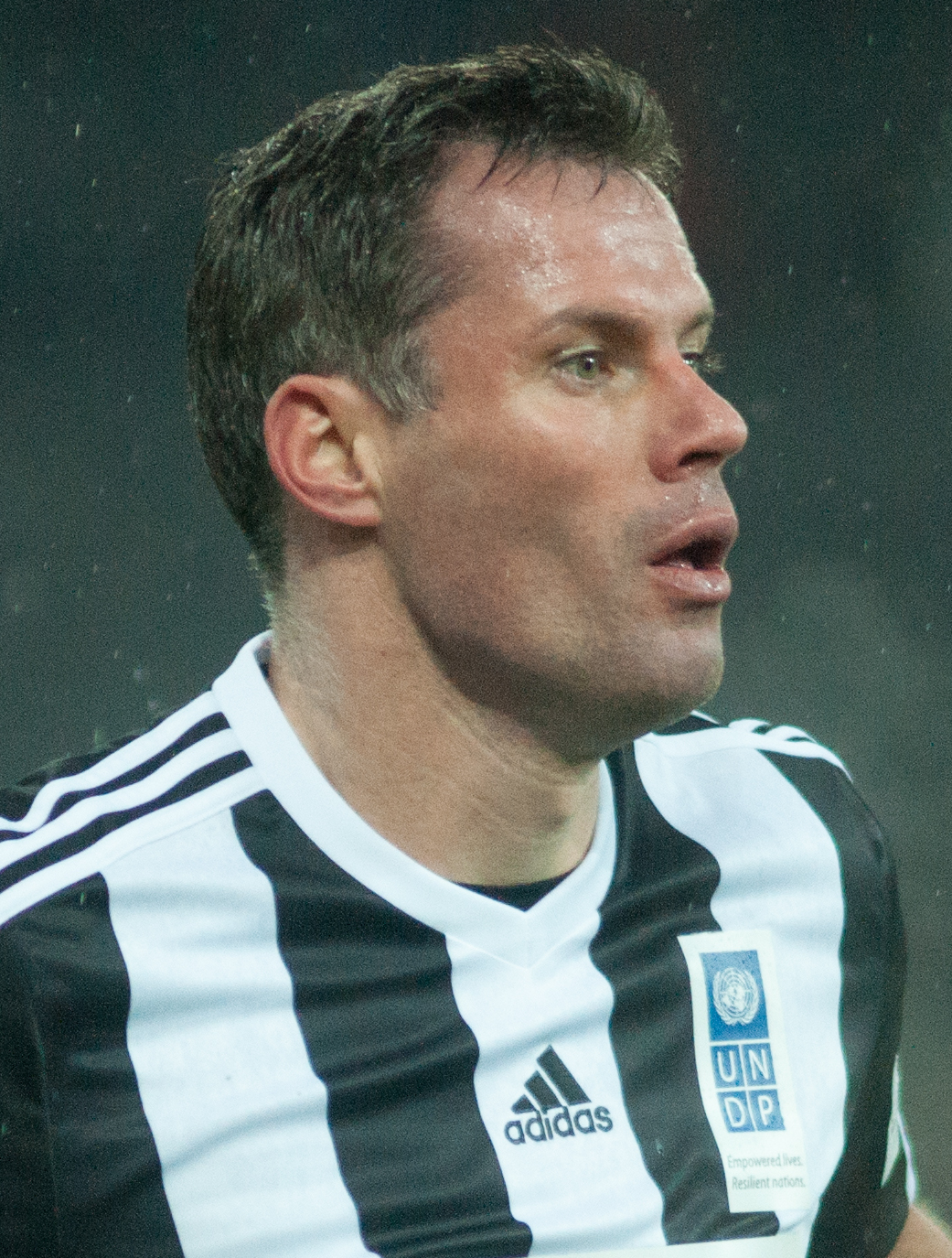
- Carragher in 2014

Personal information
- Full name: James Lee Duncan Carragher
- Date of birth: 28 January 1978 (age 48)
- Place of birth: Bootle, Merseyside, England
- Height: 6 ft 1 in (1.85 m)
- Position: Defender

Team information
- Current team: Marine (advisor)

Youth career
- 1988–1997: Liverpool

Senior career*
Years	Team	Apps	(Gls)
1996–2013	Liverpool	508	(3)

International career
1996–2000	England U21	27	(1)
1997	England U20	4	(1)
1998	England B	1	(0)
1999–2010	England	38	(0)
- * Club domestic league appearances and goals

James Lee Duncan Carragher (/ˈkærəɡər/ KARR-ə-ghər; born 28 January 1978) is an English football analyst and former player who played as a defender. A one-club man, he was Liverpool's vice-captain for ten years and has made the second-most appearances for the club with 737, the most in the Premier League era. Carragher is advisor of National League North club Marine.

Carragher started his career at the Liverpool Academy, making his professional debut in the 1996–97 season, and becoming a first-team starter the following season. Having initially played as a full-back, the arrival of manager Rafael Benítez in 2004 saw Carragher move to become a centre-back, where he found his best form. He made his 737th and final appearance for Liverpool on 19 May 2013. His honours with the club total two FA Cups, three Football League Cups, two FA Charity/Community Shields, one UEFA Champions League, one UEFA Cup and two UEFA Super Cups.

Internationally, Carragher held the national record for most caps at under-21 level and earned his senior debut in 1999. He represented England at UEFA Euro 2004 and the 2006 FIFA World Cup, before announcing his retirement from international football in 2007. He did, however, temporarily come out of retirement in order to represent England at the 2010 FIFA World Cup, before retiring again with 38 senior England caps.

Following his retirement in 2013, Carragher joined Sky Sports as a commentator and pundit. In July 2020, CBS Sports announced Carragher would join their UEFA Champions League studio broadcast team.

== Early life ==
James Lee Duncan Carragher was born in Bootle on 28 January 1978. His maternal grandfather was Maltese, and his paternal grandfather was Irish. He has described his mother as a "very holy" Catholic woman who had previously suffered miscarriages but refused to consider an abortion whilst pregnant with Carragher, despite doctors expecting him to be born with spina bifida. He was born with gastroschisis, requiring him to be immediately taken to Alder Hey Children's Hospital.

Despite the popular misconception that he grew up in poverty, Carragher clarified in his autobiography that he "grew up in a nice house in a nice area [and] had a great childhood". He attended St James Catholic Primary School in Bootle. He supported Everton while growing up, like his father, who gave him his two middle names "Lee" and "Duncan" in honour of the team's manager Gordon Lee and its player Duncan McKenzie; on the day of Carragher's birth, Lee fired McKenzie from the team. However, despite initially supporting Everton as a young boy, he later became a dedicated supporter of Liverpool. His support for the club grew when he joined Liverpool's youth academy, and eventually spending his entire professional career at the club.

== Club career ==
=== Beginnings and Cup treble (1988–2004) ===
Carragher attended the FA's School of Excellence in Lilleshall as a youth. He joined Liverpool, Everton's Merseyside rivals, in 1988; he regularly attended Liverpool's School of Excellence wearing a Graeme Sharp Everton kit. He spent a year at the Everton School of Excellence at the age of 11, but returned to Liverpool due to the club's superior coaching set-up under Steve Heighway. He failed to impress in his first appearances to the Liverpool A and B teams due to his then-small stature, but after being moved from up front to a midfield role he was able to establish himself in the reserve team. He played his first game for the reserves in the 1994–95 season, and was named man of the match against Blackburn Rovers at Haig Avenue. He helped Liverpool to win the 1996 FA Youth Cup with a 4–1 aggregate victory over a West Ham United side that included Rio Ferdinand and Frank Lampard. Carragher was tried out in defence for the first time during the tournament, and later admitted that Liverpool were not the most technically gifted side in the competition, but instead relied on team spirit and the outstanding talents of Michael Owen.

"It was a great day and one of the highlights of my Liverpool career. To score in front of the Kop was brilliant. I remember the roar when it went in."

— Carragher on scoring his first goal for Liverpool against Aston Villa in 1997.

He made his first-team debut for the "Reds" under Roy Evans in a League Cup quarter-final against Middlesbrough at the Riverside Stadium on 8 January 1997, coming on as a substitute for Rob Jones 75 minutes into a 2–1 defeat. Three days later, he made his Premier League debut as a substitute at Anfield, playing the entire second half of a 0–0 draw with West Ham United. On 18 January, he was scheduled to play as a centre-half against Aston Villa, only to be replaced in the starting line-up by Bjørn Tore Kvarme; however, Patrik Berger was taken ill, and Carragher was his last-minute replacement in central midfield. He played alongside Jamie Redknapp and scored his first goal with a header in front of the Kop in a 3–0 win. It proved to be his last contribution to the 1996–97 campaign.

Carragher broke into the first team in the 1997–98 season as Liverpool struggled to keep pace with Arsenal and Manchester United despite having talented players such as Owen, Redknapp, Robbie Fowler, Steve McManaman and Paul Ince. Throughout his early playing career, he was essentially used as a utility player that spent time as a centre-half, full-back and defensive midfielder in a squad that was often negatively labelled the "Spice Boys".

A new manager Gérard Houllier used him consistently in a new continental side focused on discipline. In his autobiography, Carra, Carragher admitted that "I always felt close to Gérard", and was full of praise for the French manager during the early part of his reign. He went on to make 44 appearances in the 1998–99 season, and was named as the club's Player of the Year. Carragher was restricted to the right-back position after scoring two own goals in a 3–2 home defeat to Manchester United early in the 1999–2000 season. Houllier never again played him at centre-back, as Sami Hyypiä and Stéphane Henchoz formed a solid partnership.

"That's the best season I've ever had. Just look at the number of big games we played. Not just three finals, but three semis, three quarters... every game was massive."

— Carragher on the cup treble in the 2000–01 season.

The 2000–01 season saw Carragher switch to the left-back position and win his first senior honours, as Liverpool won an historic cup treble of the FA Cup, the League Cup and the UEFA Cup, in a season in which he played 58 of the 63 fixtures. The following season he lifted the UEFA Super Cup after Liverpool defeated Bayern Munich in August. During a January 2002 FA Cup tie against Arsenal, Carragher threw a coin back into the stands that had been tossed at him and received a red card. He escaped an FA misconduct charge after publicly apologising, but he did receive a formal police warning about the incident.

From 2002 to 2004, Carragher suffered two serious injuries, missing the 2002 FIFA World Cup for an operation on his knee, and later receiving a broken leg after a tackle by Blackburn Rovers' Lucas Neill at Ewood Park in September 2003. During this period, his place in the team was also threatened by signings of Steve Finnan and John Arne Riise. Despite this, he was able to win a second League Cup in 2003 with Liverpool defeating Manchester United, and shortly afterwards was named the club's vice-captain.

=== Champions League and FA Cup success (2004–2007) ===
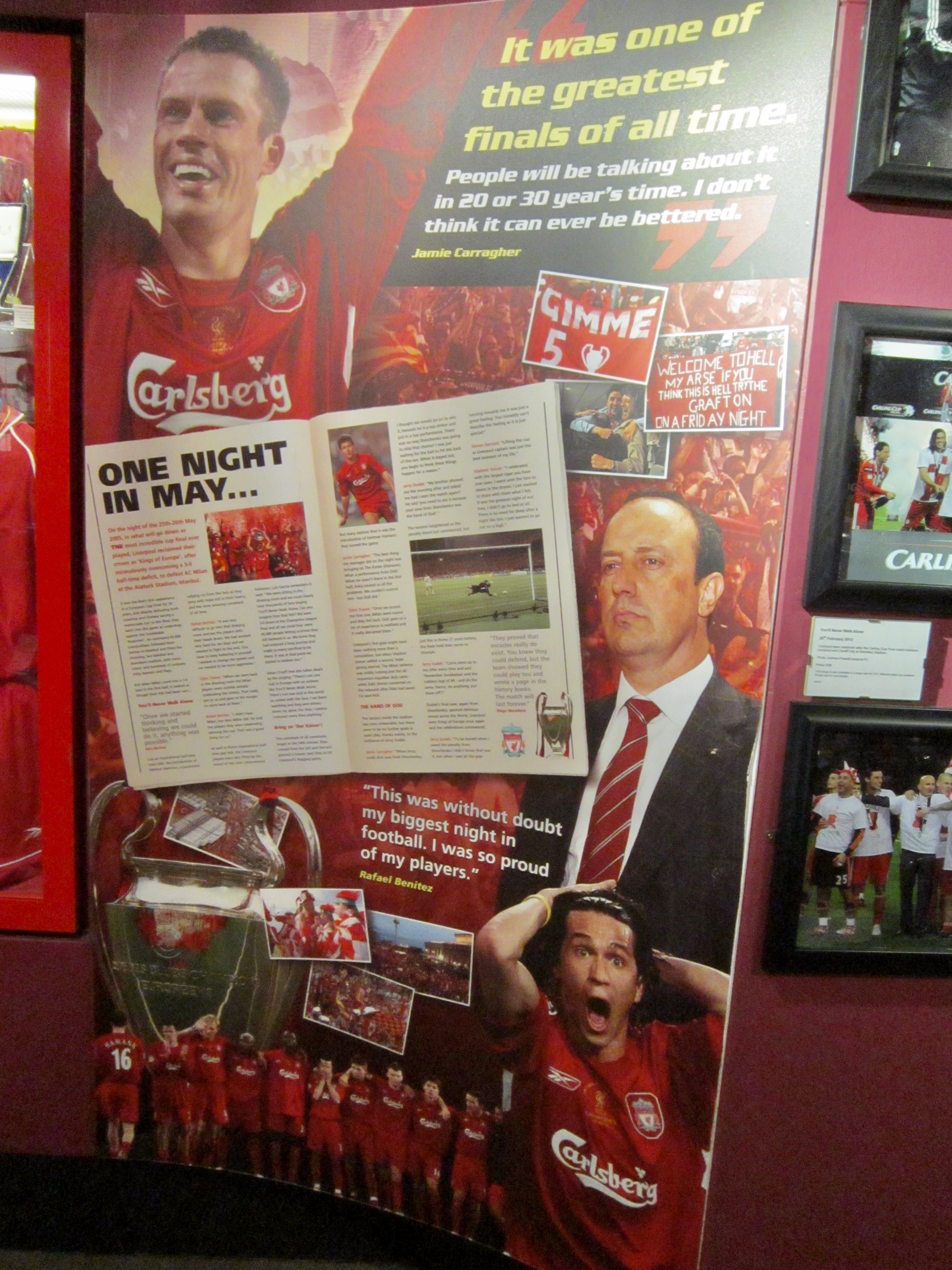
Image of Carragher (top) in the Liverpool F.C. museum commemorating the 2005 Champions League final

The 2004–05 season proved to be a career-defining one for Carragher. New manager Rafael Benítez moved him to centre-half, where he made 56 appearances all season alongside Sami Hyypiä. Carragher remained in the centre-half position for the rest of his career. Carragher worked closely with Benítez's assistant Pako Ayestarán, whom he later described as the best fitness coach of his career.

"I'd plummeted to the deepest pit of misery, only to instantly recover to ascend the highest of peaks... no footballer fancies a sneak preview of the most humiliating defeat in sporting history. But having staged a comeback that will echo in eternity, none of us would want it any other way."

— Carragher on Liverpool's Champions League win.

This season saw Carragher prove central to Liverpool's triumph in the UEFA Champions League, in particular when he made two vital last-ditch intercepts in extra-time of the final against AC Milan whilst suffering from cramp. Carragher was awarded the Liverpool Player of the Year Award at the end of the campaign, and went on to captain the team to their UEFA Super Cup victory over CSKA Moscow. He was nominated for football's most prestigious individual accolade, the Ballon d'Or, in 2005.

In May 2006, Carragher played in the FA Cup final against West Ham United, his tenth final in as many years of club football. Despite scoring an own goal in the 21st minute, Liverpool went on to win the final 3–1 on penalties after the match finished 3–3 after extra-time, giving Carragher his second FA Cup win. He appeared in the FA Community Shield win two months later.

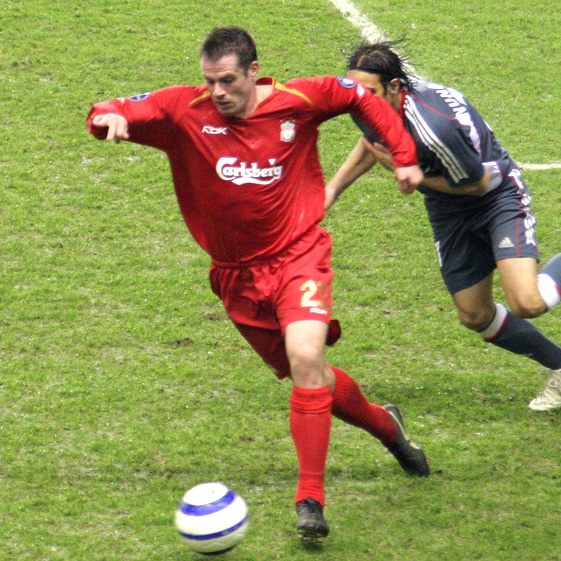
Carragher in action against Benfica in 2006

On 9 December 2006, Carragher scored his first league goal since January 1999, in a match against Fulham at Anfield. Fellow defender Daniel Agger flicked the ball on from a corner, and Carragher slid the ball under Fulham keeper Jan Laštůvka at the far post. The goal was only his fourth in his Liverpool career.

In Liverpool's Champions League semi-final second leg against Chelsea on 1 May 2007, Carragher set a new record for the most appearances in European competition for the club—his 90th European match—taking him past Ian Callaghan's 89 matches between 1964 and 1978.

Carragher was voted as Liverpool's Player of the Year for a third time after the 2006–07 season by the fans, and immediately agreed a contract extension until 2011. That season also saw Carragher announce his international retirement, citing frustration with a lack of appearances under Steve McClaren.

=== Later Liverpool career (2007–2013) ===
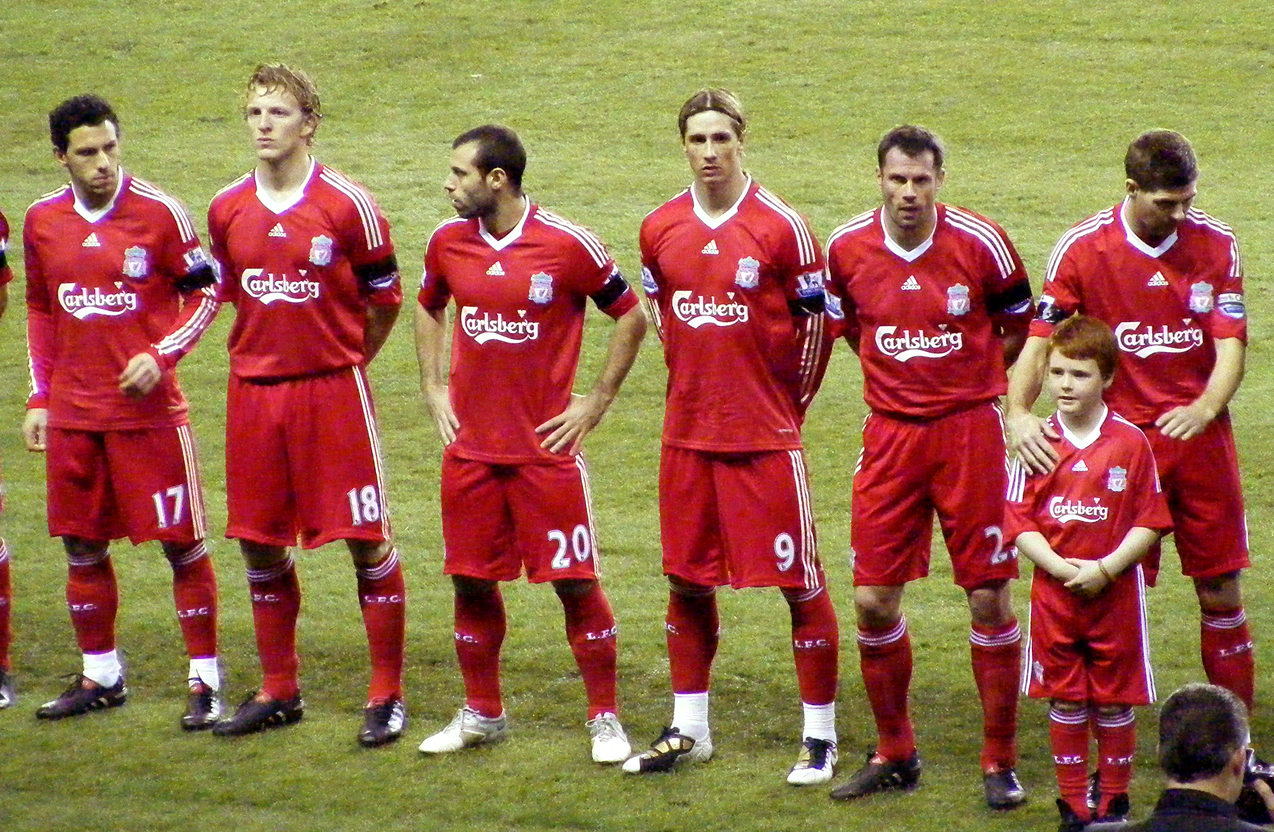
Carragher (second from right) lining up for Liverpool in 2010

The 2007–08 season saw Carragher reach his 500th appearance for Liverpool, for which he was made captain. On 18 May 2009, in the match against West Bromwich Albion, Carragher was involved in an on-field clash with fellow defender Álvaro Arbeloa, and the two had to be separated by teammates Xabi Alonso and Daniel Agger. Manager Rafael Benítez refused to comment on the matter, while Carragher later explained, "We want to keep a clean sheet and we want Pepe to have a chance of the Golden Glove for the fourth season running."

In October 2009, Carragher was involved in a late incident in Liverpool's win against their arch rivals Manchester United at Anfield when he dragged down the former Liverpool striker Michael Owen–who according to BBC Sport was "subjected to a venomous reaction from Liverpool's fans" on his first return to Anfield–with Liverpool winning, with United boss Alex Ferguson believing Carragher should have been shown a red card rather than yellow. Four days later, he was sent off in a game against Fulham, which was his first red card in more than seven years.

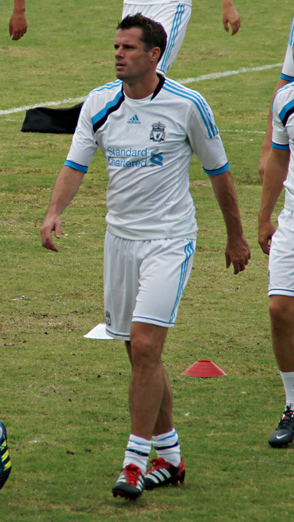
Carragher during a pre-season training session in Singapore with Liverpool in 2011

On 4 September 2010, a mixture of Liverpool players past and present played an Everton XI in Carragher's charity fund-raising testimonial match. All proceeds from the game at Anfield went to local charities through Carragher's 23 Foundation. He scored a goal for each side as his Liverpool team beat the visitors 4–1, first by scoring from the spot for the Reds, then converting a second-half penalty own goal for the club he had supported as a boy.

On 24 October 2010, Carragher scored his seventh own goal in the Premier League. Weeks later, he dislocated his shoulder in a 2–1 defeat to Tottenham Hotspur. He was out for around three months with the injury as it required surgery. He returned on 6 February 2011 in Liverpool's 1–0 win against Chelsea at Stamford Bridge.

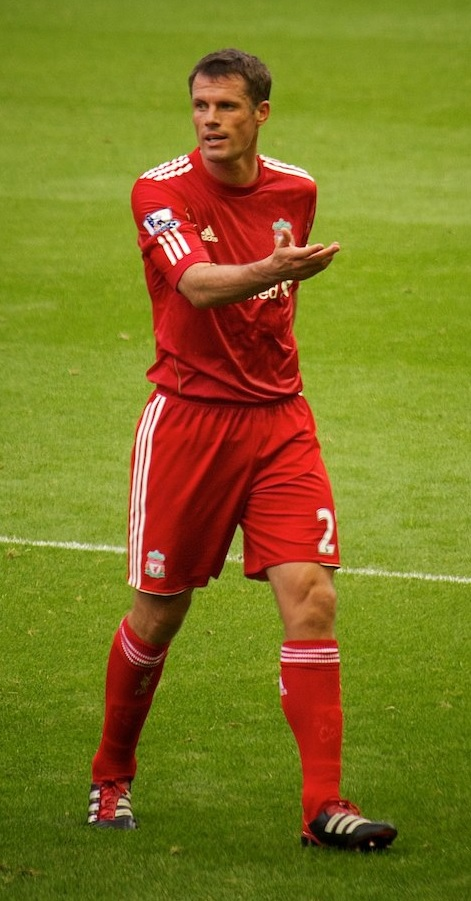
Carragher playing for Liverpool in 2011

On 24 February 2011, Carragher made his 137th European appearance in a match against Sparta Prague at Anfield, setting a new British record. On 17 April 2011, during a match against Arsenal at the Emirates Stadium, both Carragher and Jon Flanagan tried to head away the same ball, resulting in their heads colliding and Carragher being knocked out. After six minutes of treatment, Carragher was stretchered off and replaced by Sotirios Kyrgiakos. Carragher recovered in time to make his 666th appearance for Liverpool days later, in a 5–2 victory against Fulham. This appearance put Carragher second in the list of Liverpool's all-time appearance makers, behind Ian Callaghan with 857 games. In 2012, Carragher won a third League Cup with Liverpool.

In the first game of the 2012–13 season, and the start of Brendan Rodgers' term as Liverpool manager, Carragher made his 700th appearance for Liverpool in a 1–0 victory in the Europa League third-round qualifying tie against FC Gomel. Carragher often captained the side during the Europa League, and after a period of time only making league appearances as a substitute, he began to again earn a string of starting places.

=== Retirement ===
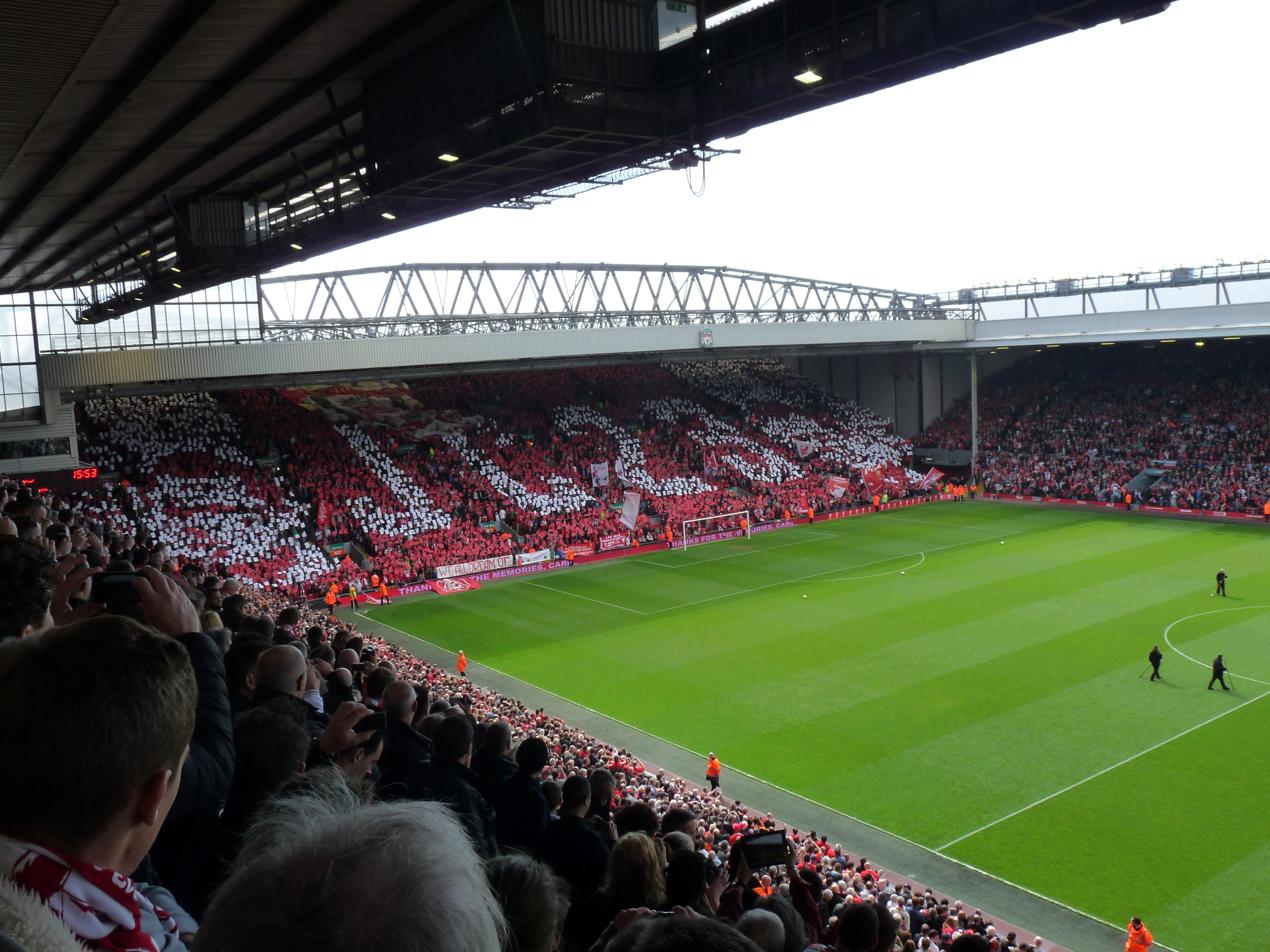
Liverpool fans pay tribute to Carragher with the mosaic JC23 (his initials and shirt number) on the Kop prior to his last competitive match for the club on 19 May 2013

On 7 February 2013, Carragher announced that he would retire at the end of the season, stating "It has been a privilege and honour to represent this great club for as long as I have and I am immensely proud to have done so since I was 9."

On 9 March 2013, he played his 500th league game for Liverpool, in a 3–2 win over Tottenham Hotspur. On 19 May 2013, Carragher played his 737th and final game for Liverpool in a 1–0 win over Queens Park Rangers. Before the match, he was given a guard of honour and was presented with a special trophy commemorating his career by Steven Gerrard and Ian Callaghan. During the match, despite his sparse goal record, Carragher hit Robert Green's post with a 30-yard strike, before being substituted in the 87th minute to a standing ovation from both sets of fans and players.

== International career ==
In 1996, Carragher made his first appearance for the England U21 side. Playing as a defensive midfielder, he became a regular for the team and was eventually made captain. By 2000, when he became ineligible for the team due to age, he had set the record for the most caps at this level with 27. This record was later eclipsed in 2007 by former Liverpool goalkeeper Scott Carson.

On 28 April 1999, he earned his first cap for the senior England team, coming on as a substitute against Hungary. He made his full international debut against Netherlands at White Hart Lane in 2001, and later came on as a substitute in England's famous 5–1 victory over Germany in the Olympiastadion. Carragher missed the 2002 FIFA World Cup to undergo surgery on a knee injury; although he had the option to delay surgery, this would have required him to miss pre-season training with Liverpool.

He was selected for UEFA Euro 2004 but did not play a game, Ledley King being preferred in his position. He was later selected for the 2006 FIFA World Cup, and although not in the original starting eleven, he replaced Gary Neville, who suffered an injury.

Carragher was one of three players to have a penalty saved by Portugal's Ricardo, as England yet again succumbed to a penalty shoot-out exit in the quarter-finals. Carragher, who had been brought on as a substitute for Aaron Lennon late in the game, scored with his first attempt but was forced to re-take his penalty by referee Horacio Elizondo, who had not blown his whistle. Carragher's shot was saved by Ricardo, who parried the shot onto the crossbar from the follow-up attempt.

On 9 July 2007, it was reported that Carragher was considering retiring from the England squad. When Talksport host Adrian Durham accused Carragher of "bottling it" on his programme, Carragher phoned in to defend himself and say that as he was not being regularly selected he was indeed thinking about retirement, but would leave it until the upcoming match against Germany to decide. Carragher did retire from international football, although he left open the possibility to return if needed for an international tournament. In his autobiography, he stated a number of reasons for his retirement: he prioritised Liverpool over England, he wanted to spend more time with his family, and most of all he was unwilling to feature as a squad player.

On 11 May 2010, it was announced that Carragher had been named in Fabio Capello's preliminary 30-man squad for the 2010 FIFA World Cup. Carragher said of his return to international football, "The FA got in touch a few weeks ago and asked if I would have a rethink, due to injury problems; I said I would make myself available."

On 24 May, Carragher played his first match for England in three years, a friendly against Mexico which England won 3–1. Carragher appeared in both of England's opening World Cup games, receiving a booking in each which resulted in a one-match ban. He was not selected for the knock-out stage exit at the hands of Germany, being dropped in favour of Matthew Upson. Carragher permanently retired from international football, stating that his international return had been a "one-off" due to injuries to other players.

== Style of play ==
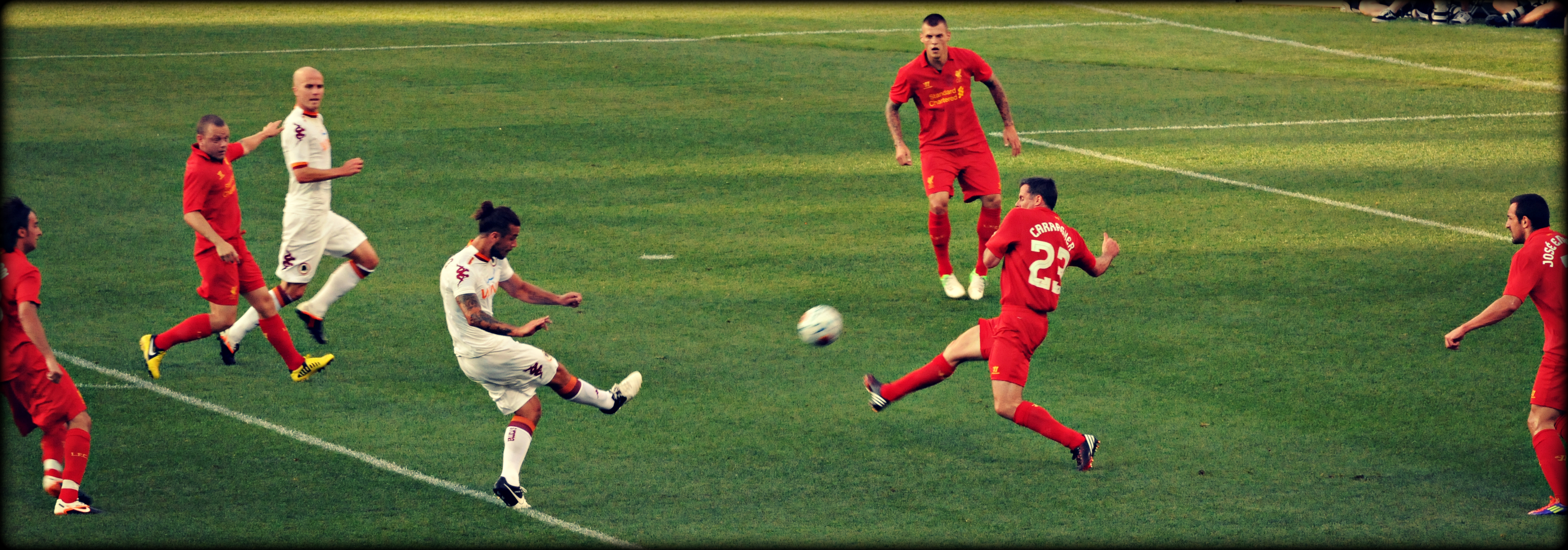
Carragher blocks a shot from Roma's Dani Osvaldo in 2012

Carragher played as an attacking midfielder in his early days at Anfield and had been a striker as a child, but he soon learned the art of defending. He was able to play across the back four, often playing as a utility full back on either flank, and occasionally in the centre of midfield early in his Liverpool career but went on to spend most of his time at club and country level at centre-back. When playing at full back Carragher was sometimes labelled as a "limited defender" as he compared unfavourably with attacking full-backs due to his lack of pace or notable technical skills.

Carragher was a versatile and consistent old-fashioned centre-back, known for his work-rate, stamina, and leadership. Characterized as a physical and direct-tackling playing style, he possessed organisational skills, positioning, and tactical awareness, which enabled him to read the game effectively and execute last-ditch, recovery tackles.

Former teammate Jamie Redknapp described him as "ultra competitive and probably the most driven footballer I have ever met". Carragher was named by Didier Drogba as the toughest opponent he had ever played against with the Ivorian describing him as an aggressive but fair defender.

In addition to his defensive skills, Carragher was also known for his longevity.

== Post-retirement activity ==
In 2009, Carragher set up the 23 Foundation, a charitable foundation with the stated aims of helping the youth of Merseyside. In 2010, he donated all the proceeds from his testimonial year to the charity which created an initial fund of £1 million.

In August 2015, Carragher visited "Carragher's", a pub dedicated to his career at Liverpool, on West 39th street, Manhattan, New York. It was revealed that Carragher would return to the pitch to play for England in Soccer Aid, a charity football match in aid of UNICEF, alongside Robbie Fowler.

In January 2018, Carragher visited Kingsway House, a shelter which had been set up for rough sleepers by Liverpool hotel firm Signature Living. He spent several hours talking to homeless residents and the volunteers and announced plans for a special charity football match featuring ex-Liverpool and ex-Everton players and celebrities.

Carragher has worked with Liverpool fan Andy Grant, a former Royal Marine who was hit by a bomb in Afghanistan which resulted in his right leg being amputated, in helping to promote his story and his subsequent autobiography. Both men are from Bootle, and Grant has said: "It's safe to say I never dreamed that at 30 I would be able to call on a mate and have him host a night of talking about my autobiography". In May 2018, Grant released his book You'll Never Walk. Carragher was present at several of the book launches and provided the book's foreword.

On 10 October 2018, Carragher joined the opening of Cotton Street shelter. The Cotton Street Project welcomes Liverpool's most vulnerable members of society to enjoy the shelter. Carragher said: "What Lawrence is doing is fantastic. I am proud to give him and the Cotton Street Project my support. I'll be keeping in regular contact with those using the shelter and hopefully helping them to turn their lives around for the better."

== Media career ==
Carragher signed a contract with Sky Sports for the 2013–14 season to appear as a pundit alongside Graeme Souness, Neville and Redknapp. Carragher appeared on Monday Night Football on Sky Sports alongside Neville with presenter Ed Chamberlin from 2013 to 2016. Carragher and Neville were praised for their analysis, with their former on-field rivalry adding to their personalities on-air.

Carragher is an occasional sports columnist for the Daily Mail. In January 2014, the Daily Mail struck a partnership deal with Talksport radio which saw Mail journalists and columnists, including Carragher, appear as guests on the station.

In August 2017, Danish Sports Channel TV3 Sport, signed Carragher as its new football expert. He provided live analysis of the UEFA Champions League.

On 11 October 2017, Carragher was unveiled as The Telegraph's new football columnist. In June 2018, he joined its team of commentators to cover the World Cup in Russia. He also featured in The Telegraph's Total Football podcast throughout the tournament.

On 11 March 2018, the Daily Mirror published a video showing Carragher spitting at a car carrying a man and 14-year-old girl after covering Manchester United's 2–1 win over Liverpool for Sky. The man driving the vehicle shouted "Unlucky Jamie lad. Two, one." After the video surfaced, Carragher issued an apology to the driver and his daughter, calling it a "moment of madness" and the "worst mistake" of his career. He was suspended by Sky Sports and removed from TV3 Sport's coverage the following day. He returned to TV3 Sport in early April 2018. Peter Norrelund, CEO of Modern Times Group issued a statement, saying, "I do not think that a single mistake should have such serious consequences that we can no longer have Jamie Carragher on the team. Therefore, he is back on the football field for TV3 when quarter-finals are played in early April." Carragher made a brief appearance on Sky Sports in July, giving an interview following England's World Cup semi-final defeat to Croatia, before resuming his role as a football pundit in August 2018 for the start of the 2018–19 Premier League season.

Carragher also became a part of CBS Sports' UEFA Champions League coverage, notably featuring with Kate Scott, Micah Richards and Thierry Henry in a show that achieved widespread critical acclaim.

== Personal life ==
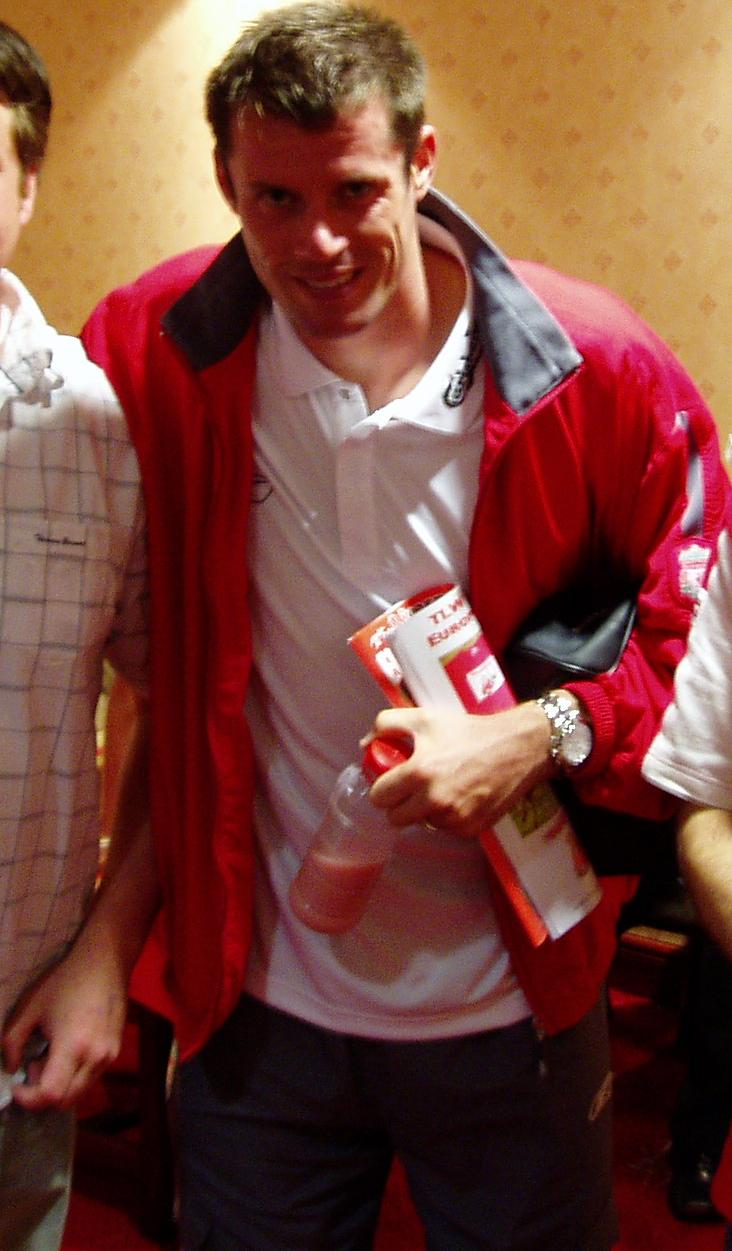
Carragher in 2005

Carragher is of Maltese descent through his maternal grandfather. He married his childhood sweetheart, Nicola Hart, in 2005. They have a daughter, Mia, who is an actress, and a son, James, who is also a footballer. Upon James' call-up to the Malta national team, in February 2025, Carragher and his son received citizenship of Malta.

On 8 April 2020, during the COVID-19 pandemic in Malta, Carragher sent a message of encouragement to the Maltese people.

Carragher occasionally visits schools as part of his charity work, promoting the importance of family life, and is a patron of the Alder Hey Charity. He was awarded the Freedom of the Borough of Sefton for his local charity work and "the exceptional example he sets to the youth of today" in 2008. Carragher's autobiography, Carra, was released in 2008.

Carragher endorsed and donated to Andy Burnham in the 2010 Labour Party leadership election. In 2023, he told UnHerd that he was not fully into politics because he is "a little bit wary of getting too involved in something that's not [his] area of expertise". However, he praised the people of Liverpool for their political awareness: "We stand up for ourselves, we don't accept what the government is saying about a certain thing—even now, 30 or so years after Hillsborough. [...] The city doesn't allow people to walk all over us, and maybe that [annoys people] around other parts of the country. But I actually love that about this city. It's got that real backbone and it'll fight and it'll take on people."

In August 2026, HM Revenue and Customs filed a bankruptcy petition against Carragher at the High Court in London over an unpaid tax bill reported to be between £700,000 and £800,000. Carragher settled the debt in October 2026.

== Career statistics ==
=== Club ===
Appearances and goals by club, season and competition
Club	Season	League			FA Cup		League Cup		Europe		Other		Total	
Club	Season	Division	Apps	Goals	Apps	Goals	Apps	Goals	Apps	Goals	Apps	Goals	Apps	Goals
Liverpool	1996–97	Premier League	2	1	0	0	1	0	0	0	—		3	1
Liverpool	1997–98	Premier League	20	0	0	0	2	0	1 (Note: Appearances in UEFA Cup)	0	—		23	0
Liverpool	1998–99	Premier League	34	1	2	0	2	0	6	0	—		44	1
Liverpool	1999–2000	Premier League	36	0	2	0	2	0	—		—		40	0
Liverpool	2000–01	Premier League	34	0	6	0	6	0	12	0	—		58	0
Liverpool	2001–02	Premier League	33	0	2	0	1	0	15 (Note: Appearances in UEFA Champions League)	0	2 (Note: One appearance in UEFA Super Cup, one in FA Community Shield)	0	53	0
Liverpool	2002–03	Premier League	35	0	3	0	5	0	11 (Note: Six appearances in UEFA Champions League, five in UEFA Cup)	0	0	0	54	0
Liverpool	2003–04	Premier League	22	0	3	0	0	0	4	0	—		29	0
Liverpool	2004–05	Premier League	38	0	0	0	3	0	15	0	—		56	0
Liverpool	2005–06	Premier League	36	0	6	0	0	0	12	1	3 (Note: Two appearances in FIFA Club World Cup, one in UEFA Super Cup)	0	57	1
Liverpool	2006–07	Premier League	35	1	1	0	1	0	13	0	1 (Note: Appearance in FA Community Shield)	0	51	1
Liverpool	2007–08	Premier League	35	0	4	0	3	0	13	0	—		55	0
Liverpool	2008–09	Premier League	38	0	3	0	1	0	12	0	—		54	0
Liverpool	2009–10	Premier League	37	0	2	0	1	0	13 (Note: Five appearances in UEFA Champions League, eight in UEFA Europa League)	0	—		53	0
Liverpool	2010–11	Premier League	28	0	0	0	0	0	10 (Note: Appearances in UEFA Europa League)	0	—		38	0
Liverpool	2011–12	Premier League	21	0	5	0	5	0	—		—		31	0
Liverpool	2012–13	Premier League	24	0	1	0	2	0	11	0	—		38	0
Career total			508	3	40	0	35	0	148	1	6	0	737	4

=== International ===
Appearances and goals by national team and year
National team	Year	Apps	Goals
England	1999	1	0
England	2000	1	0
England	2001	5	0
England	2002	1	0
England	2003	1	0
England	2004	7	0
England	2005	6	0
England	2006	9	0
England	2007	3	0
England	2008	0	0
England	2009	0	0
England	2010	4	0
Total		38	0

== Honours ==
Liverpool Youth

- FA Youth Cup: 1995–96

Liverpool

- FA Cup: 2000–01, 2005–06; runner-up: 2011–12
- Football League Cup: 2000–01, 2002–03, 2011–12; runner-up: 2004–05
- FA Charity/Community Shield: 2001, 2006
- UEFA Champions League: 2004–05; runner-up 2006–07
- UEFA Cup: 2000–01
- UEFA Super Cup: 2001, 2005
- FIFA Club World Championship runner-up: 2005

Individual

- PFA Team of the Year: 2005–06 Premier League
- Liverpool Player of the Season: 1998–99, 2004–05
- Honorary Freedom of the Metropolitan Borough of Sefton: 23 January 2006
- Honorary Fellowship from Liverpool John Moores University: July 2012
- Premier League Player of the Year by Northwest Football Awards: 2013
- One Club Award: 2025

== See also ==
- List of one-club men in association football
