= Jo Wilson (presenter) =

Scottish television presenter (born 1984)

- Born: 1984 (age 41–42); Perth, Perthshire, Scotland
- Education: Perth High School
- Alma mater: Glasgow Caledonian University
- Occupation: Presenter
- Years active: 2011–present
- Employer: Sky Sports News

Jo Wilson (born 1984) is a Scottish television presenter who currently works for Sky Sports News.

== Career ==
Wilson started as a Graduate Trainee at Sky Sports News in 2011, before becoming a sub editor then getting promoted to co-producer. This led her to making her screen debut as a presenter on Sky Sports News in 2015.

== Education ==
Wilson graduated from Glasgow Caledonian University with a master's degree in journalism in 2011. During her studies, Wilson worked at Pizza Hut in Stirling.

== Personal life ==
As a sprinter and a jumper, Wilson represented Perth and her county. Receiving an athletics scholarship when she was 17, she spent a year at The Stony Brook School in New York doing athletics and basketball. She supports St Johnstone and saw her first match at McDiarmid Park aged 7 in November 1992 against Motherwell; the game was abandoned at half-time due to snow.

On 23 September 2020, Wilson gave birth to a daughter. She returned to Sky Sports News on 20 April 2021, after being on maternity leave for 13 months due to COVID-19 restrictions.

On 5 September 2022, Wilson announced that she had been diagnosed with stage III cervical cancer following a recent smear test. A month later, she married her partner Dan McGrath, with whom she had a daughter.

She returned to Sky Sports News on 30 November 2022, co-hosting on the 7pm timeslot. In April 2023, it was reported that she had fully recovered.
