= Sky Sports News =

British television channel

- Logo used since 2025
- Country: United Kingdom
- Broadcast area: United Kingdom; Ireland

Programming
- Picture format: 1080p MPEG-4 HDTV

Ownership
- Owner: Sky Group (Comcast)

History
- Launched: 1 October 1998; 28 years ago
- Former names: Sky Sports.com TV (2000–2001); Sky Sports News HQ (2014–2017)

Links
- Website: skysports.com

Availability

Streaming media
- Sky Go: Watch live
- Now: Watch live (UK); Watch live (Ireland)
- Virgin TV Go: Watch live (UK only)
- Virgin TV Anywhere: Watch live (Ireland only)

Sky Sports News (SSN) is a British subscription television sports news channel run by Sky, a division of Comcast.

== History ==
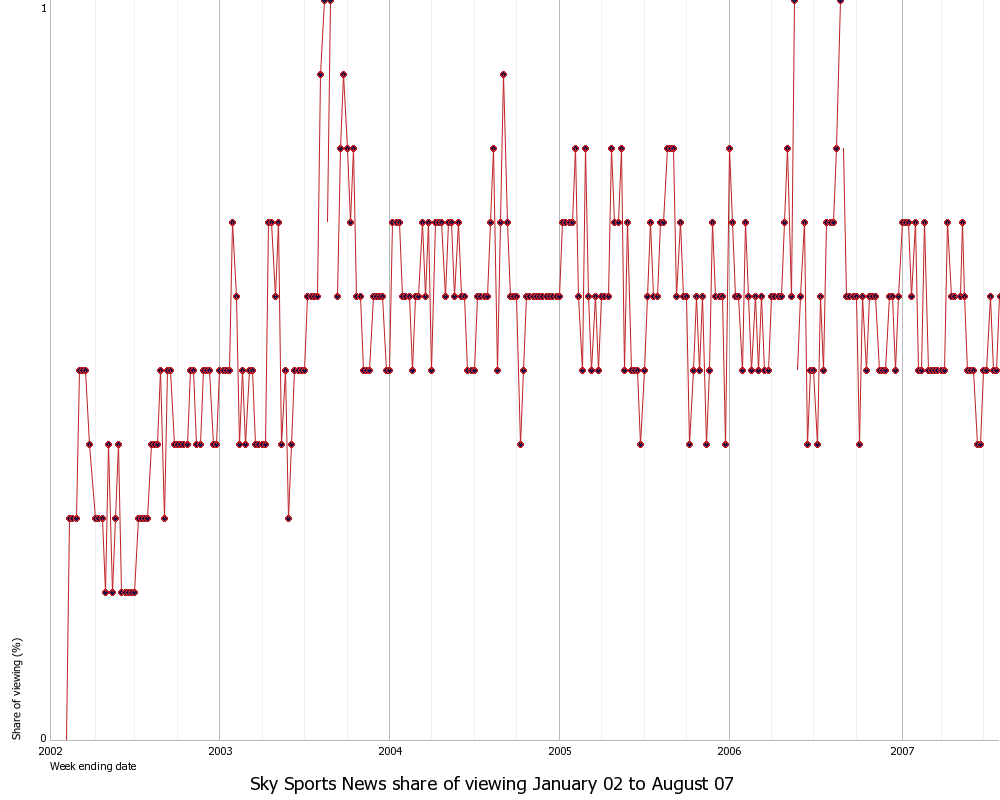
Sky Sports News viewing figures

Sky Sports News – August 2007, featuring former presenter Dan Lobb

Sky Sports first started broadcasting sports news bulletins when it began broadcasting the Premier League in the autumn of 1992. Initially, they took the form of a brief Football Update before being expanded into a 30-minute programme called Sky Sports Centre. These programmes were generally broadcast on weekdays at 6pm and 10pm.

Sky Sports News began broadcasting internal test runs on 10 August 1998 with Mike Wedderburn and Kelly Cates launching the channel with the first edition of Good Morning Sports Fans. The service became officially available to the public on 1 October, the launch date of BSkyB's Digital Satellite service, and was BSkyB's first digital only channel. On 10 April 2000, Sky Sports News relaunched as Sky Sports.com TV, to tie with the launch of the SkySports.com website.

The channel scrapped its ".com TV" look, and on 1 July 2001, Sky Sports News launched another graphics change. A major part of this was the standardisation, i.e., a more corporate look across the Sky channels. The channel also scrapped its slogan and just paid attention to the fact of the news.

From 2002, Sky Sports News was available free to view on digital terrestrial TV. From April 2002, Sky Sports News had another face-lift, the channel stayed in the same studio, but with a silver look replacing the old wooden bench, and there was a promise of being first for breaking news, along with much more useful information.

In 2004, Sky Sports News changed its image, with a more open blue look to the channel. The titles featured players such as Frank Lampard, Tim Cahill, Thierry Henry and Ryan Giggs passing the football to each other and unveiling the Sky Sports News logo. Programmes such as Sky Sports Centre were dropped, and replaced with shows such as Sky Sports Now, Sky Sports Today, Sports Saturday, Sports Sunday, Through the Night, News HQ at 5, News HQ at 6, Goals Express, Today's Goals Now and Sky Sports News at Ten, with the exception of Good Morning Sports Fans, Gillette Soccer Special and Sky Sports News at Ten, some of these programme titles have been retired or renamed.

On 20 May 2007, SSN broadcast the Conference National play-off final between Exeter City and Morecambe. This was the first live match to be shown on the channel since certain European games involving British teams were shown to provide exclusivity when competing with the then operational OnSports (owned by ITV) as Sky Sports News was not available at that time via digital terrestrial platforms. This was due to all other Sky Sports channels being occupied by live sport. This enabled Freeview viewers to watch a live match on Sky Sports. The station also had live coverage of Wales v New Zealand on 26 May 2007 and the La Liga tie between Espanyol and Barcelona in December 2007.

=== Virgin Media dispute ===
On 1 March 2007, Virgin Media removed Sky's basic channels including Sky One, Sky Two, Sky News, Sky Sports News, Sky Travel and Sky Travel Extra, from their Television Services after a dispute between Virgin Media and BSkyB caused by the expiry of their carriage agreement and their inability to reach a new deal, after attempts were made to reach an agreement. At Midnight, Sky Sports News was removed, with its EPG slot being renamed derisively as "OLD SKY SPORTS SNOOZE" (it was removed with a public apology by Richard Branson hours later). As a direct rival to Sky Sports News, Virgin Media and Setanta Sports launched Setanta Sports News on 30 November 2007. A deal was eventually reached between Virgin and Sky resulting in Sky Sports News returning to the Cable platform on 13 November 2008 on channel number 517.

From 1 September 2009, the channel was made available to subscribers of the Sports Pack, in addition to being available in the News & Events Pack.

=== 2010–present ===
Sky Sports News was removed from Freeview on 23 August 2010 and replaced with Sky3+1, a one-hour timeshift Sky3. Approval for the DTT change was needed from the regulator Ofcom, which told Sky and multiplex licence holder Arqiva that the move "would not unacceptably diminish the capacity of the services broadcast to appeal to a variety of tastes and interests". Sky claimed that the move back to pay TV allowed them to improve the channel through increased editorial investment.

The channel also previously used a different piece of music for each news programme, the most well-known of these being Republica's "Ready to Go", "The Time Is Now" by Moloko, "Surface to Air" by The Chemical Brothers, "Shooting Star" by Deepest Blue, and "Club Foot" by Kasabian.

Sky Sports News was rebranded as Sky Sports News HQ on 12 August 2014. As part of the change the channel moved to Sky channel 401. At the same time the channel introduced an updated studio including new features, overhauled graphics and a new theme. Following the rebrand of the Sky Sports channels in July 2017, the channel returned to its original name: Sky Sports News.

== Sky Sports News HD ==
Sky Sports News HD launched on 23 August 2010 on Sky channel 455, transferring to channel 405 several months later. The HD channel offered enhancements such as widescreen viewing and sharper graphics. A range of new programmes, such as First Fast Now and Sky Sports News at Seven were launched plus new presenters, as well as the extension of existing offerings, such as Ed Chamberlin presenting a regular live Sunday afternoon sports update.

Sky backed the launch of the channel with an extensive advertising campaign.

== Simulcasts ==
A number of programmes are simulcast on other Sky Sports channels, including Soccer Saturday and many of the midweek Soccer Specials. Also, Sky Sports News airs on Sky Sports Main Event when that channel is not showing live sport.

Soccer Saturday has been simulcast on other Sky Sports channels for many years. Until the 2007/08 season most or all of the programme was broadcast on Sky Sports 1. This was cut back in August 2007 to just the live scores section of the programme i.e., between 15:00 and 17:15. Simulcasting of Soccer Saturday on Sky Sports 1 stopped altogether in August 2010 but returned to Sky Sports 1 for the 2013–14 season as part of Sky Sports 1 devoting all of Saturdays to football. The simulcast ran between 15:00 and 16:55. For the 2014–15 season the simulcasts switched to the newly launched Sky Sports 5. Since the rebranding of the Sky Sports channels in 2017, Soccer Saturday has been shown on Sky Sports Premier League and Sky Sports Football, and more recently, the 3pm to 5pm portion of the programme has also been broadcast on Sky One and this portion of the programme is also aired on Sky Showcase.

Until 1 July 2013, two hours of live feed (daily at 07:00 BST, weekdays at 17:00 BST) and one hour of delayed feed (daily at 23:00 BST) were picked up by Fox Soccer in the United States; both Fox Soccer Channel and Sky Sports were News Corporation channels at the time. More hours of the channel were picked up in critical periods such as the end of transfer windows and coverage of qualifying draws for Euro tournaments. The American simulcasts were discontinued on that date as Fox Cable Networks wound down Fox Soccer's operations for the 2 September 2013 launch of FX sister channel FXX on its channel space for the launch of Fox Sports 1 and Fox Sports 2. Until March 2017, the only Sky output carried on American TV were darts coverage on BBC America and Sky Sports 2's coverage and related programming, such as The Verdict, involving the England cricket team on ONE World Sports. ONE World Sports closed in March 2017. Sky's English team coverage has since moved to Willow in the United States, including the pre-show and The Verdict.

Upon Comcast's acquisition of Sky, Sky Sports began to collaborate with the networks of its U.S. counterpart NBC Sports (which holds the U.S. media rights to the Premier League), beginning with Sky Sports News transfer window coverage being simulcast on its pay television channel NBCSN, and Sky reporters contributing to an NBCSN-produced transfer window programme hosted by its own Premier League pundits. In February 2019, it was announced that beginning 4 March 2019, an hour of programming from Sky Sports News would air daily on NBCSN at 11:00 a.m. ET (as part of a new daytime lineup resulting from its loss of rights to The Dan Patrick Show). The simulcast is dropped temporarily at times to facilitate other programming, such as the run-up to the American National Football League's draft in April. NBCSN began re-airing Sky Sports News from August 2020 until the network's demise on 31 December 2021. On 2 October 2023 Sky Sports News was free to air for one day only to celebrate its 25th anniversary, with a livestream of the channel available to watch on YouTube.

== Notable Presenters ==
=== Current presenters ===
- Pete Graves
- Hayley McQueen
- Mike Wedderburn
- Jo Wilson
- Clare Tomlinson
- Simon Thomas (presents Soccer Saturday, Soccer Special weekend editions)

=== Former presenters ===
- Kate Abdo
- Ally Begg
- Georgie Bingham
- Paul Boardman
- David Bobin
- Kelly Cates
- Ed Chamberlin
- Dave Clark
- Millie Clode
- Ali Douglas
- Jill Douglas
- Ed Draper
- Sean Fletcher
- Kirsty Gallacher
- Steve Gaisford
- Alex Hyndman
- Charlotte Jackson
- David Jones
- Adam Leventhal
- Graham Little
- Dan Lobb
- Gabby Logan
- Matthew Lorenzo
- Sam Matterface
- Kate Mason
- Rob McCaffrey
- Sarah-Jane Mee
- Lee McKenzie
- Alex Payne
- Ian Payne
- Natalie Sawyer
- Isha Sesay
- Andy Steggall
- Di Stewart
- Jasper Taylor
- Georgie Thompson
- Rachel Wyse
- Charlie Webster
- Jim White
- Rhodri Williams
- Rob Wotton
- Tony Wrighton

== See also ==
- Sky Sports
