= Ed Chamberlin =

British sports broadcaster

Edmund Chamberlin
- Born: Edmund Alan Chamberlin; 6 February 1974 (age 52); Shepton Mallet, Somerset, England
- Occupations: Journalist and presenter
- Years active: 1999-present
- Employer(s): ITV (2017–); Sky Sports (1999–2016)
- Children: son, daughter

Edmund Alan Chamberlin (born 6 February 1974) is an English sports broadcaster who has been working for ITV since January 2017.

== Presenting career ==
Chamberlin was born in Shepton Mallet, Somerset. As a boy he attended Ludgrove School, where he captained the cricket first eleven. A former bookmaker and journalist, he first appeared on Sky Sports in 1999. He co-hosted the betting show, The Full SP, with Jeff Stelling before joining the Sky Sports News team on a full-time basis. Chamberlin has presented coverage of the UEFA Champions League and the World Cup draws.

In 2011, Chamberlin became the main football presenter for Sky Sports, replacing Richard Keys. Chamberlin hosted coverage of Premier League matches on the Super Sunday and Monday Night Football shows. Chamberlin presented his final coverage of a Premier League match for Sky on Tuesday 17 May 2016, a re-arranged fixture between Manchester United and Bournemouth.

Chamberlin became the main presenter of ITV's Horse Racing coverage when it moved to the channel in 2017.

== Personal life ==
In 2013, Chamberlin became an ambassador for WellChild, a British charity for sick children. He was a committee member of A Night For Life in aid of The National Brain Appeal which took place in June 2017 at The Park Lane Hotel.

== Sources ==
- Ed Chamberlin at IMDb
- Ed Chamberlin TV Newsroom
