= Kirkby, North Yorkshire =

Village and civil parish in North Yorkshire, England

Coordinates: 54°26′46″N 1°10′13″W

Kirkby
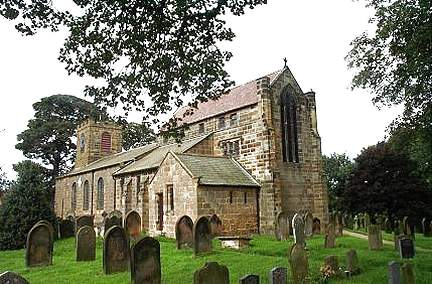
- St Augustine's Church, Kirkby, in 2004

- Location within North Yorkshire
- Population: 309 (2011 census)
- OS grid reference: NZ538059
- Civil parish: Kirkby
- Unitary authority: North Yorkshire
- Ceremonial county: North Yorkshire
- Region: Yorkshire and the Humber
- Country: England
- Sovereign state: United Kingdom
- Post town: MIDDLESBROUGH
- Postcode district: TS9
- Police: North Yorkshire
- Fire: North Yorkshire
- Ambulance: Yorkshire

Kirkby (historically known as Kirkby-in-Cleveland) is a village and civil parish in the county of North Yorkshire, England, near Great Busby and 2 miles (3.2 km) south of Stokesley. The village is mentioned in the Domesday Book as belonging to Uhtred. The name of the village derives from the Old Norse kirkju-býr, which means church with a village. At the 2001 Census, the population of the village was recorded at 313, dropping slightly to 309 at the 2011 Census. In 2015, North Yorkshire County Council estimated the population to be 310.

From 1974 to 2023 it was part of the Hambleton District, it is now administered by the unitary North Yorkshire Council.

The village used to be served by Stokesley railway station on the Picton to Battersby railway line, which was 1 mile (1.6 km) north of the village. The A172 road is to the north and the B1257 Stokesley to Helmsley road is in the village of Great Broughton, 0.62 miles (1 km) to the east.

St Augustine's Church, Kirkby was built in 1815 to replace a medieval building. The chancel was rebuilt in the early 1900s by London architect Temple Moore. It is a grade II* listed building. Besides the church, Kirkby also has a village hall and a public house, the Black Swan.

To the south of the village is Kirby Bank (without a second 'K'). Part of the pathway there is a medieval greenway known as the Kirby Bank Trod, which is believed to have been laid in the 12th century as part of the route to Rievaulx Abbey. The track is a scheduled ancient monument.

West of the village is Dromonby, the location of Dromonby Hall, a grade I listed 16th-century house.

== See also ==
- Listed buildings in Kirkby, North Yorkshire
