= Old Rectory, Stokesley =

Building in Stokesley, North Yorkshire, England

Coordinates: 54.4682°N 1.1894°W

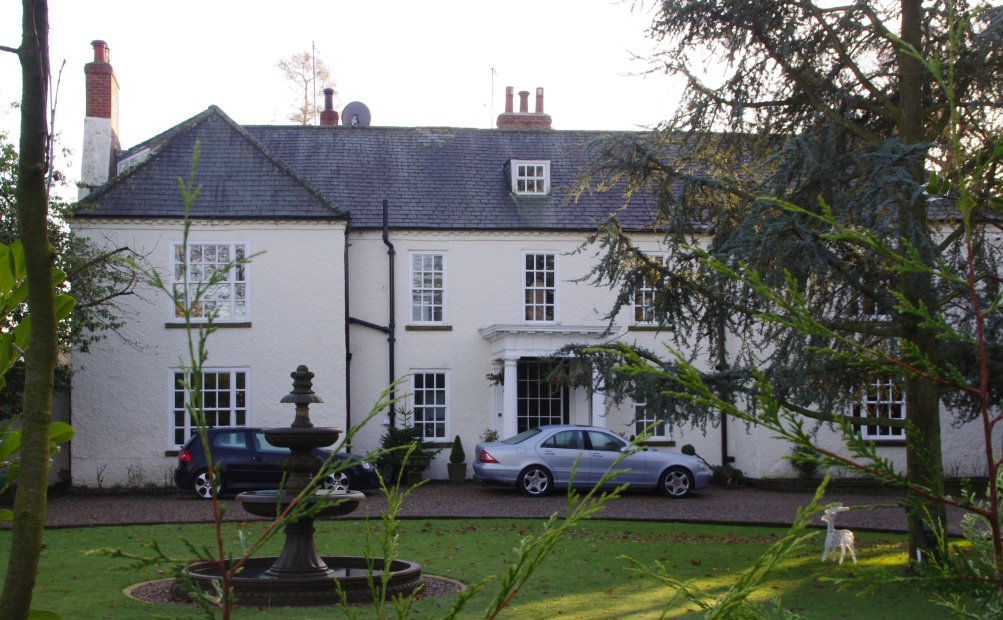
The building, in 2012

The Old Rectory is a historic building in Stokesley, a town in North Yorkshire, in England.

The building was constructed in the early 18th century as the rectory of St Peter and St Paul's Church, Stokesley. It was extended and at least partly rebuilt in 1792. In the 19th century, one first-floor room was converted to serve as an ecclesiastical court. The building was grade II* listed in 1952.

The house is pebbledashed and has hipped roofs of Welsh and Lakeland slate. It has two storeys and two parallel ranges with three bays flanked by single-bay wings extending into bows on the south. On the front is a Roman Doric porch. The windows are sashes, tripartite on the wings, and there is one central dormer. Inside, there is an early staircase, some 18th-century plasterwork and a lot of 19th-century woodwork. The former courtroom on the first floor has a gallery and a dais.

== See also ==
- Grade II* listed buildings in North Yorkshire (district)
- Listed buildings in Stokesley
