= Stokesley Packhorse Bridge =

Bridge in Stokesley, North Yorkshire, England

Coordinates: 54°28′09″N 1°11′34″W

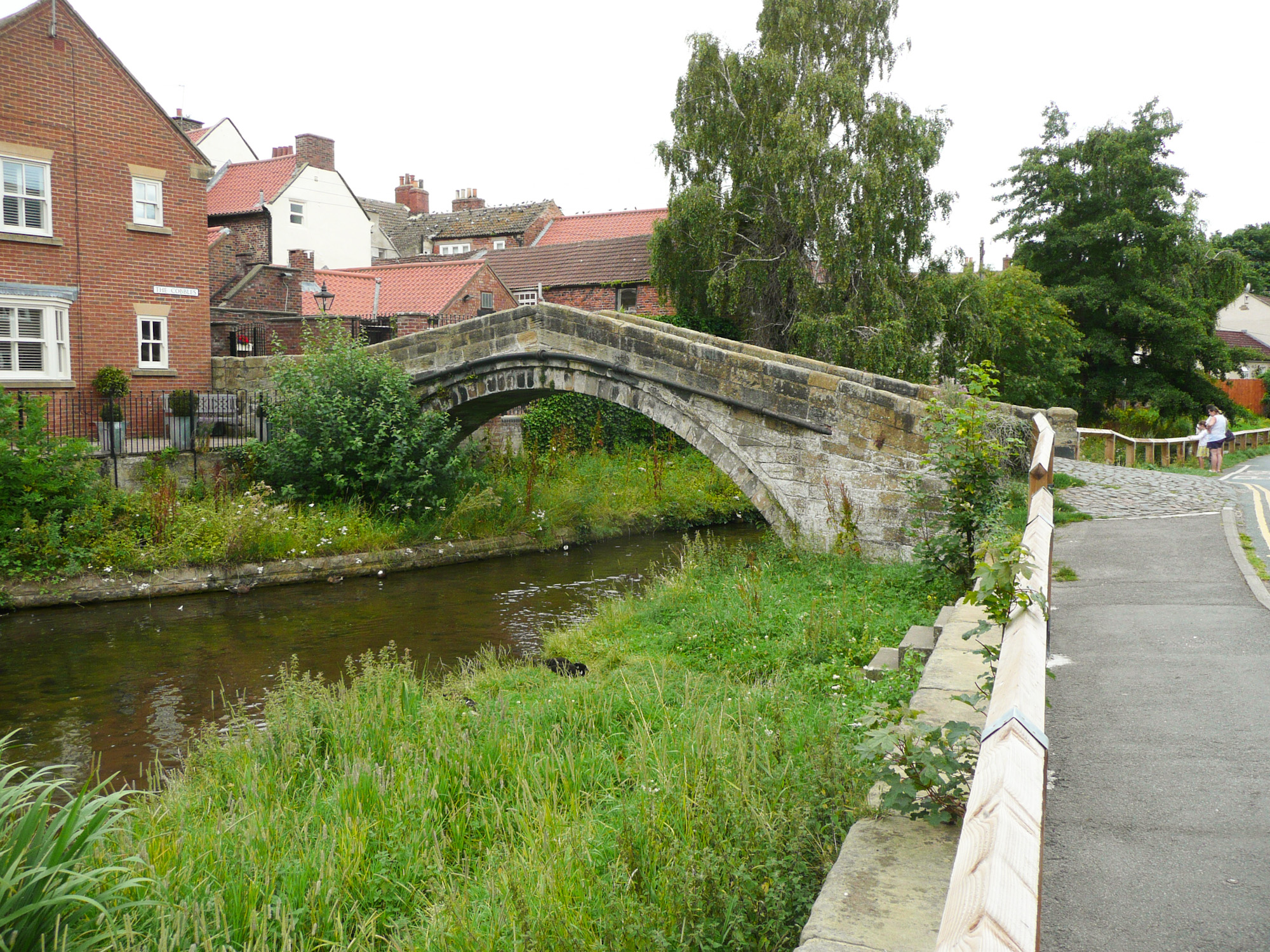
The bridge, in 2020

Stokesley Packhorse Bridge is a historic structure in Stokesley, a town in North Yorkshire, in England.

Repairs to a bridge in Stokesley were ordered in 1648, and this may be the first reference to the packhorse bridge. The current bridge, across the River Leven, may date from the 17th century, or may be early 18th century. In 1859, Thomas Whellan described it as "an ancient bridge" and noted it was steep. It has been grade II listed since 1966.

It is a narrow stone bridge, consisting of a single round arch with voussoirs and a hood mould. The parapets are high, and the ends are slightly splayed with piers. The arch spans 12 yards (11 m), and the bridge is 5 feet (1.5 m) wide.

== See also ==
- Listed buildings in Stokesley
