= Listed buildings in Kirkby, North Yorkshire =

Kirkby is a civil parish in the county of North Yorkshire, England. It contains 15 listed buildings that are recorded in the National Heritage List for England. Of these, one is listed at Grade I, the highest of the three grades, one is at Grade II*, the middle grade, and the others are at Grade II, the lowest grade. The parish contains the village of Kirkby and the surrounding countryside. The listed buildings consist of houses, cottages and associated structures, a farmhouse and farm buildings, a church, a vicarage and a telephone kiosk.

== Key ==
| Grade | Criteria |
|---|---|
| I | Buildings of exceptional interest, sometimes considered to be internationally important |
| II* | Particularly important buildings of more than special interest |
| II | Buildings of national importance and special interest |

== Buildings ==
| Name and location | Photograph | Date | Notes | Grade |
|---|---|---|---|---|
| Dromonby Hall, Cottage and outbuilding 54.44507°N 1.18183°W | — | 16th century | The remaining part of a large house that has been mainly demolished. It in stone, the cottage is pebbledashed, the roofs of the hall and the cottage are in Lakeland slate, and the outbuilding has a Welsh slate roof. There are two storeys, and the hall has a T-shaped plan, with two bays and a cross-wing, and the cottage has two bays. Most of the windows are sashes, and there is a round-arched stair window. In the left return is a blocked doorway with a chamfered surround and a flattened Tudor arch. | I |
| School House; 54.44597°N 1.17017°W | | 17th century | The house, which has been altered and extended, is in sandstone on a chamfered plinth, and has a tile roof with a stone ridge, copings and kneelers. There are two storeys and four bays. The doorway has a flattened Tudor arched lintel, and the windows are sashes, some horizontally-sliding, and one with a keystone. | II |
| Ivy House; 54.44700°N 1.17219°W | — | Mid 18th century (probable) | A farmhouse, later a private house, in sandstone, with a pantile roof, a stone ridge, copings and kneelers. There are two storeys and six bays. The house contains a through-passage doorway with an extended lintel, and to the right are two later doorways. At the right is a stable-type window, and external steps leading up to a loft door. The other windows are sashes, one horizontally-sliding. | II |
| The Cottages; 54.44710°N 1.17219°W | — | Mid 18th century (probable) | A row of three cottages in sandstone, with a pantile roof, a stone ridge, copings and kneelers. There are two storeys, each cottage has one bay, and there is a rear wing. Each cottage has an open wooden porch, and the windows are horizontally-sliding sashes with extended lintels and keystones. | II |
| Dromonby House; 54.44448°N 1.17972°W | — | Mid to late 18th century | The house is in sandstone, with a dentilled and moulded eaves cornice, and a green slate roof with a stone ridge, coping and kneelers. There are two storeys and five bays, and a four-bay rear wing. The doorway in the second bay has a fanlight and a cornice hood on freestanding columns. The windows are sashes with flat heads, apart from the windows in the second and fourth bays in the upper floor, which have round heads. All the windows have lintels carved to resemble voussoirs, and keystones. | II |
| Church Cottage; 54.44682°N 1.17197°W | — | Mid to late 18th century | The house is in sandstone, and has a pantile roof with a stone ridge, and a block kneeler and coping on the left. There are two storeys and two bays. The central doorway has a fanlight, and the windows are sashes, those in the upper floor horizontally-sliding. | II |
| Cleveland House; 54.44723°N 1.17232°W | — | Mid to late 18th century (probable) | The house is in sandstone, and has a pantile roof with a stone ridge, copings and curved kneelers. There are two storeys and five bays, and a single-storey rear wing. In the left bay is a segmental carriage arch, and to the right is an open gabled porch. Most of the windows are horizontally-sliding sashes, there are some casement windows, and some windows have extended lintels and keystones. The rear wing ends in a coach house and dovecote with a pyramidal roof. | II |
| Wayside Cottage; 54.44692°N 1.17207°W | — | Mid to late 18th century | The cottage is in sandstone and has a pantile roof with a stone ridge. There are two storeys and one wide bay. The windows are horizontally-sliding sashes, the ground floor window and the doorway each with an extended lintel and a keystone. | II |
| Dernel; 54.44734°N 1.17242°W | — | Late 18th century (probable) | The cottage at the end of a row is in sandstone, and has a pantile roof with a stone ridge, coping and kneelers. There are two storeys and one bay. The doorway has a hood with a slate roof, and the windows are casements. | II |
| Dromonby Farmhouse; 54.43850°N 1.17740°W | — | Late 18th century (probable) | The farmhouse is in sandstone, and has a pantile roof with a stone ridge, coping and kneelers. There are two storeys and an attic, two wide bays and two narrow bays, and lean-tos at the rear. The doorway has pilasters and a fanlight. The windows on the front are sashes with extended lintels and long keystones, and in the left return are horizontally-sliding sashes. | II |
| Farmbuilding west of Dromonby Hall Farm; 54.44533°N 1.18210°W | — | Late 18th century | A barn and a stable with a loft above, In sandstone with a hipped pantile roof. There are two storeys and three bays, the middle bay projecting under a coped pediment with a band. This bay contains an elliptical cart arch, in the left bay are a doorway with a fanlight and a loading door above, and in the right bay are stable doors. All the openings have tall keystones. | II |
| The Vicarage; 54.44737°N 1.17192°W | — | Late 18th century (probable) | The vicarage is in sandstone, and has a pantile roof with a stone ridge, coping and kneelers. There are two storeys and two wide bays. In the centre is a gabled wooden porch with pieced bargeboards and a spike finial, and a doorway with a fanlight. This is flanked by square bay windows with pilasters and dentilled cornices, and there is a similar bay window in the right return. The other windows are sashes. | II |
| St Augustine's Church; 54.44699°N 1.17140°W | | 1815 | The chancel of the church was rebuilt in 1905 by Temple Moore. The church is built in sandstone, the nave and vestry have a roof of Lakeland slate, and the chancel roof is tiled. The church consists of a nave, a taller chancel with a clerestory, a south aisle, a north chapel, a south vestry, and a west tower with an embattled parapet and corner pinnacles. The nave has round-arched windows and a sundial. | II* |
| Kirby House; 54.44567°N 1.17016°W | — | Early 19th century | The house is in sandstone, and has a pantile roof with a stone ridge, copings and kneelers. There are two storeys and three bays. The central doorway has pilasters, a fanlight and a cornice, and the windows are sashes. | II |
| Telephone kiosk 54.44664°N 1.17106°W | | 1935 | The K6 type telephone kiosk to the south of St Augustine's Church was designed by Giles Gilbert Scott. Constructed in cast iron with a square plan and a dome, it has three unperforated crowns in the top panels. | II |
