= Great Broughton =

Great Broughton refers to two villages in England:

- Great Broughton, Cumbria
- Great Broughton, North Yorkshire

== See also ==
- Great Boughton, Cheshire, England
