= Listed buildings in Great and Little Broughton =

Great and Little Broughton is a civil parish in the county of North Yorkshire, England. It contains ten listed buildings that are recorded in the National Heritage List for England. Of these, one is listed at Grade II*, the middle of the three grades, and the others are at Grade II, the lowest grade. The parish contains the village of Great Broughton, the area of Little Broughton, and the surrounding countryside, and the listed buildings consist of houses, farmhouses and farm buildings.

== Key ==
Grade	Criteria
II*	Particularly important buildings of more than special interest
II	Buildings of national importance and special interest

== Buildings ==
Name and location	Photograph	Date	Notes	Grade
Meynell Hall; 54.44792°N 1.13160°W		Early 17th century	A farmhouse that has been altered, it is in sandstone on a chamfered plinth, with sprocketed eaves and a pantile roof. There are two storeys and three bays, and at the left is a pebbledashed wing with one storey and an attic. On the front is a doorway with a wooden lintel, and at the rear is a doorway with a chamfered surround and two blank shields in the lintel. Many of the windows are mullioned, some have been altered, some mullions are missing, and other windows are sashes.	II*
Broughton Grange; 54.44297°N 1.15074°W	—	c. 1700 (probable)	The house is in sandstone, and has a pantile roof with a stone ridge, copings and kneelers. There are two storeys and attics, and the west front has three bays. In the left bay is a doorway with a flattened Tudor arched dated and initialled lintel. The windows are casements, those in the ground floor with extended lintels, one dated and initialled, and keystones, and those in the attics are in half-dormers with bargeboards and spike finials. On the left is a single-storey extension with a hipped roof. The east front has five bays, a doorway with a plain surround, and similar half-dormers.	II
Manor House; 54.452525°N 1.15894°W	—	Early 18th century	The house is in sandstone on a chamfered plinth, with a floor band, a moulded eaves cornice, and a pantile roof with a stone ridge, copings, and kneelers. There re two storeys, five bays, and a one-storey one-bay wing on the left. The doorway has a chamfered surround and a fanlight, and the windows are sashes with chamfered surrounds and chamfered hood moulds.	II
Crow Wood House; 54.46471°N 1.13740°W	—	Early to mid 18th century	A farmhouse in brick on a stone plinth, with alternating quoins, a moulded and dentilled eaves cornice and a pantile roof, hipped on the left and gabled on the right, with a stone ridge and gable copings and kneelers on the right. There are two storeys and an L-shaped plan, with a front range of three bays and a four-bay extension on the left at the rear. The central doorway has a fanlight, and the windows are sashes with flat gauged-brick arches and stone keystones.	II
Red Hall and Red Hall Cottage; 54.45307°N 1.13880°W	—	Early to mid 18th century	A house divided, the left wing forming the cottage. It is in dark red brick on a chamfered stone plinth, with quoins, a moulded and dentilled eaves cornice, and pantile roofs with stone copings and kneelers. There are two storeys and five bays, and flanking lower two-storey two-bay rendered wings. The doorway has a segmental-arched lintel, and the windows in the main block are sashes with wedge lintels and keystones. At the rear is a stair Venetian window, and in the wings are horizontally-sliding sashes.	II
Wall and outbuildings, Red Hall; 54.45275°N 1.13872°W	—	Early to mid 18th century	The wall enclosing the rear garden is in dark red brick, with brick buttresses, stone coping, and later stone buttresses, and it is between 7 feet (2.1 m) and 11 feet (3.4 m) high. Attached to it are lean-tos, and a two-storey garden house.	II
Blue Hall Cottage; 54.44751°N 1.15827°W	—	18th century	The house was built from the ruins of an earlier house. It is in sandstone, with quoins, and a pantile roof with a stone ridge, copings and kneelers. There are two storeys and three bays. In the centre is a doorway with a moulded architrave, a pulvinated frieze and a segmental pediment, and immediately to the right is a blocked doorway. The windows are sashes, those in the ground floor with keystones.	II
Capstan; 54.44967°N 1.15833°W	—	18th century	The house is in sandstone, with a stone floor band, and a hipped pantile roof with stone ridges. There are two storeys and three bays. In the centre is a porch with a flat roof, and the windows are sashes with wedge lintels.	II
White House Farmhouse; 54.45796°N 1.14331°W	—	18th century	The farmhouse is rendered, with stone dressings, on a chamfered plinth, with alternating quoins, and a Welsh slate roof with stone copings and kneelers. There are two storeys, a double depth plan, and three bays, and on the right is a later recessed two-storey three-bay wing in brick. The central doorway has a reeded architrave and a four-light fanlight, and the windows are sashes with large keystones. In the left return is a round-arched stair window, and a dated and initialled quoin.	II
Barn, byre and gin-gang, Crow Wood House; 54.46490°N 1.13717°W	—	Late 18th century	The farm buildings to the east of the house are in red brick with stone dressings, and pantile roofs with stone ridges, and they form an L-shaped plan. The barn has two storeys and five bays, and contains a blocked doorway and slit vents. The stable has one storey, and three doorways with long-and-short jambs. To the north is a five-sided gin-gang with four sandstone piers.	II
