= Preston Grammar School =

Building in Stokesley, North Yorkshire, England

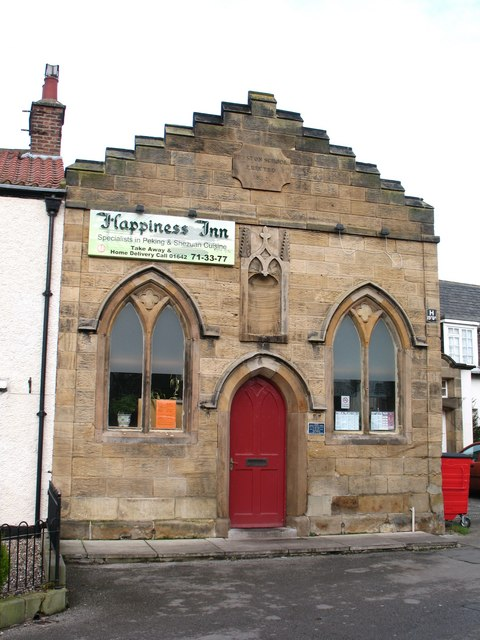
The town, in 2008

Preston Grammar School is a historic building in Stokesley, a town in North Yorkshire, in England.

The school was founded by John Preston, who died in 1814, and left £2,000 in his will for its construction. However, Preston's father's will had never been acted upon, and the dispute was not fully resolved by the Court of Chancery until 1835. In 1832, a building was constructed on College Square in the town. The school closed in 1918, and the building has since had various uses, including as a Sunday school, a farm shop, and a food takeaway. The building was grade II listed in 1983.

The building is constructed of sandstone, with a Welsh slate roof, and a stepped gable facing the road. It has one tall storey, two bays on the front and three on the right return. In the centre of the front is a doorway with a pointed arch and a hood mould, above which is a hooded niche. The doorway is flanked by windows with pointed arches, Y-tracery and hood moulds, and in the gable is a dated plaque. The right return is embattled and contains three similar windows. Inside, the former school room retains a moulded cornice and a circular border.

== See also ==
- Listed buildings in Stokesley
