= Handyside, Stokesley =

House in Stokesley, North Yorkshire, England

Coordinates: 54°28′06″N 1°11′46″W

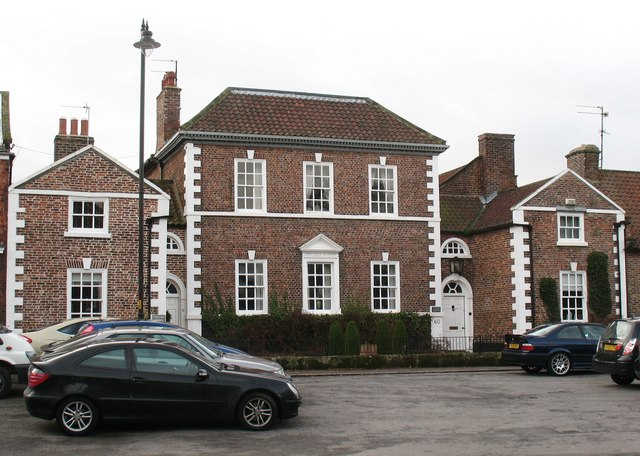
The building, in 2008

Handyside is a historic pair of buildings in Stokesley, a town in North Yorkshire, in England.

The building was constructed in the mid 18th century, in the Palladian style. The two properties became known as Handyside House and Handyside Cottage. John Martin Robinson describes it as the "grandest [residential building] in town". In the late 20th century, Handyside House was the official residence of the Bishop of Whitby. The entire building was grade II* listed in 1966.

The building is constructed of brick on a plinth, with stone dressings, quoins and pantile roofs. The central block has two storeys and three bays, a sill band, a bracketed eaves cornice, and sash windows in architraves. The central window in the ground floor has a pulvinated frieze and a pediment, and the others have flat gauged brick arches and fluted keystones. The block is flanked by gabled wings with one storey and an attic and one bay, and sash windows, the lower one with a keystone. The single-storey links each contain a doorway with a radial fanlight and a keystone, and a semicircular window above.

== See also ==
- Grade II* listed buildings in North Yorkshire (district)
- Listed buildings in Stokesley
