= St Augustine's Church, Kirkby =

Church in Kirkby, North Yorkshire, England

Coordinates: 54°26′49″N 1°10′17″W

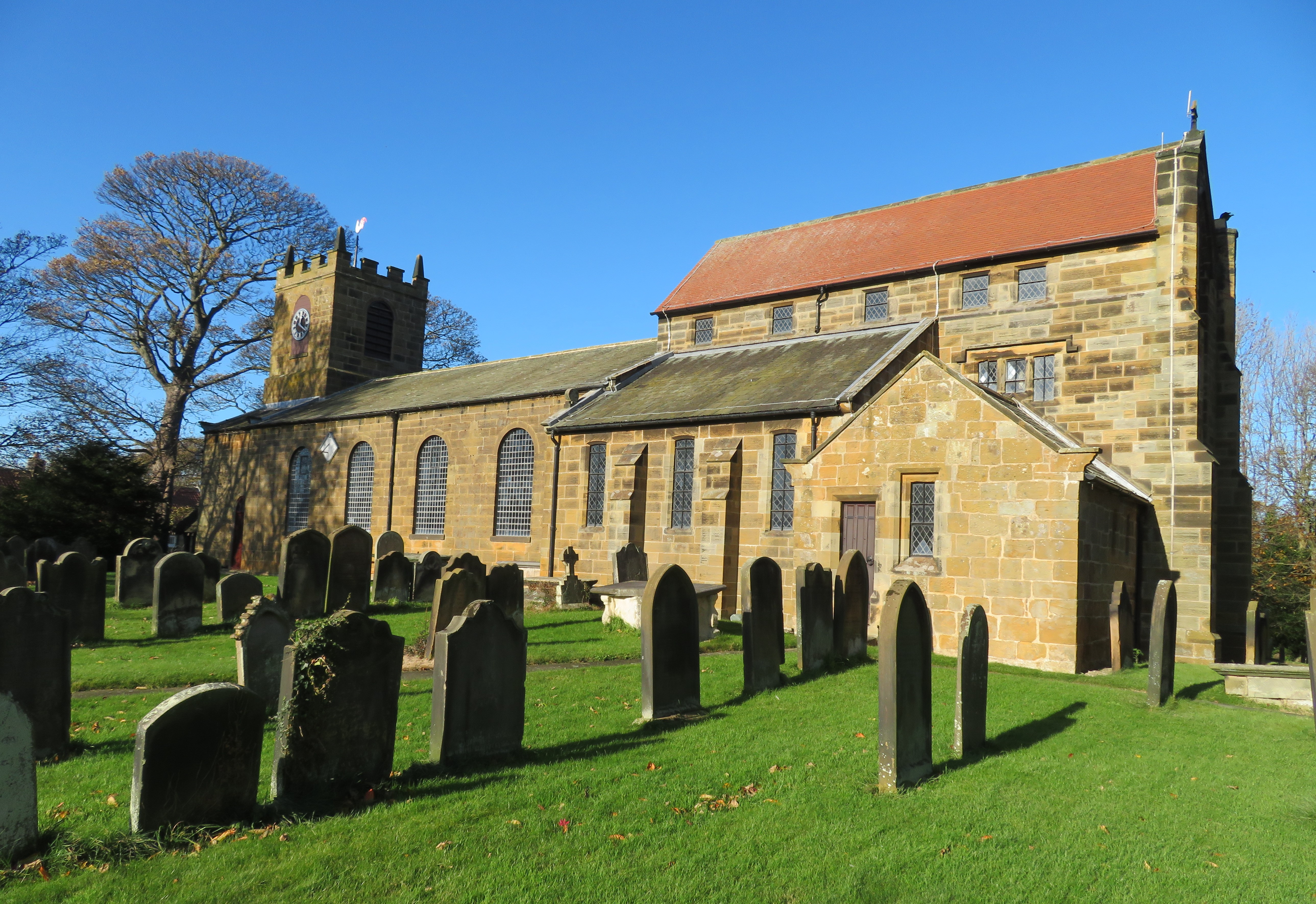
The church, in 2020

St Augustine's Church is the parish church of Kirkby, North Yorkshire, a village in England.

There was a church in Kirkby from the early mediaeval period, and by the early 19th century, it was a cruciform building with a central tower. The church was entirely rebuilt in 1815, although the vestry was constructed using some of the stones from the old church. The chancel of the new church was rebuilt by Temple Moore in 1905. The building was grade II* listed in 1966.

The church is built of sandstone, the nave and vestry have a roof of Lakeland slate, and the chancel roof is tiled. The church consists of a nave, a taller chancel with a clerestory, a south aisle, a north chapel, a south vestry, and a west tower with an embattled parapet and corner pinnacles. The nave has round-arched windows and a sundial. Inside, there is a west gallery, late Georgian memorial tablets, fragments of Saxon sculpture built into the vestry, and an aumbry, piscina, sedilia and painted wooden reredos in the chancel.

== See also ==
- Grade II* listed churches in North Yorkshire (district)
- Listed buildings in Kirkby, North Yorkshire
