= Stokesley Manor House =

House in Stokesley, North Yorkshire, England

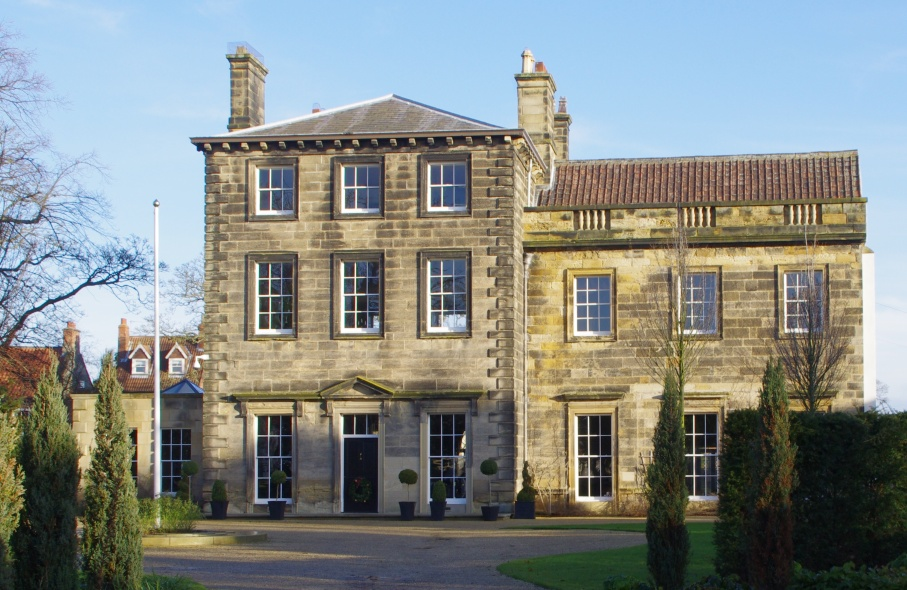
The building, in 2012

Stokesley Manor House is a historic building in Stokesley, a town in North Yorkshire, in England.

The manor has a long history, but the oldest part of the current manor house dates from the early 18th century, perhaps soon after 1717, when it was purchased by William Peirson. In 1799, the Peirson family sold the house to Thomas Wilkinson, who restored and extended it, to such an extent that it was nicknamed the "castle". In 1914, the building was converted into a hospital for servicemen injured fighting in World War I. After World War II, the older wing of the house was reduced in size from seven bays to three, the porch being moved to a new entrance in the centre of the remaining section. The porch was later removed, and the house was converted into a public library and council offices. These closed in 2003, and the building was converted back into a private house. The building has been grade II* listed since 1952.

The house is built of sandstone. The older part has two storeys, a double depth plan, a pantile roof, a plinth, a cornice, and a parapet with balustraded panels. In the centre of the ground floor is a doorway and the windows are sashes. All the openings have architraves, and those in the ground floor also have a pulvinated frieze and a cornice. The later part has three storeys, three bays, quoins, a modillion eaves cornice, and a hipped Welsh slate roof. The windows are sashes in architraves, those on the ground floor with pulvinated friezes and a continuous bracketed cornice, the middle window with a pediment. A segmental arcaded screen wall extends from the northeast corner of the house. Inside, some early plasterwork and window woodwork survives.

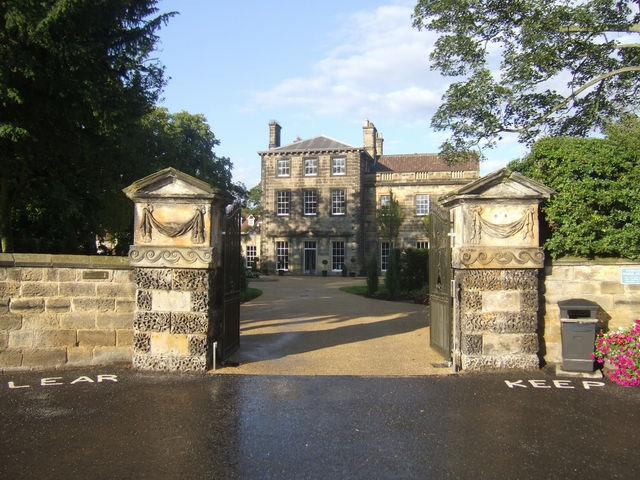
The wall and gate piers

The garden wall to the north of the house is grade II listed. It is built of red brick, with buttresses and flat coping, and is curved at the west end. On the east and north sides the walls are in stone with gabled coping. At the southeast corner is a pair of gate piers moved from Angrove Hall, which was demolished in 1832. They are in stone and square, and have vermiculate rusticated lower courses, and a wide guilloché moulded band. The upper part of each pier has drapery swags, a cornice and a pediment.

== See also ==
- Grade II* listed buildings in North Yorkshire (district)
- Listed buildings in Stokesley
