= Listed buildings in Stokesley =

Stokesley is a civil parish in the county of North Yorkshire, England. It contains about 100 listed buildings that are recorded in the National Heritage List for England. Of these, four are listed at Grade II*, the middle of the three grades, and the others are at Grade II, the lowest grade. The parish contains the market town of Stokesley and the surrounding countryside. Most of the listed buildings are houses, cottages, shops, offices, and associated structures. The others include churches, chapels and associated structures, farmhouses and farm buildings, bridges, public houses, restaurants and cafés, banks, an animal pound, a mill, a former grammar school, and a town hall.

== Key ==
Grade	Criteria
II*	Particularly important buildings of more than special interest
II	Buildings of national importance and special interest

== Buildings ==
Name and location	Photograph	Date	Notes	Grade
St Peter and St Paul's Church; 54.46967°N 1.19014°W		mid-14th century	The oldest part of the church are the tower and the chancel, with the rest of the body of the church dating from between 1767 and 1777. Restorations were carried out by Temple Moore in 1912 and 1915. The church is built in sandstone with a Welsh slate roof, and it consists of a nave, a chancel with a vestry and a west tower. The tower has three stages, diagonal buttresses, string courses, two-light bell openings, clock faces, and an embattled parapet with corner pinnacles, and there is a porch in the angle of the tower and the nave.	II
Wall north of St Peter and St Paul's Church; 54.46989°N 1.18974°W	—	Medieval (possible)	The retaining wall running along the north side of the churchyard is in course squared stone, and has gabled coping.	II
58 West Green; 54.46855°N 1.19620°W	—	17th century	The house has a ground floor in sandstone, the upper floor in brick, and a high-pitched swept pantile roof with stone coping and a kneeler on the left. There are two storeys and one bay. On the right is a doorway with a Tudor arch and an unused date panel. To the left is a tripartite sash window, above is a tripartite modern window, and both have a keystone.	II
27 High Street; 54.46939°N 1.19141°W	—	Late 17th century (possible)	The former public house is stuccoed, and has a plinth, quoins, a bracketed eaves cornice, a top cornice band and parapet, and a pantile roof with stone copings. There are two storeys and attics, and four bays. On the right is a segmental carriage arch with impost blocks and a keystone, and the windows are sashes with keystones. At the rear are long pebbledashed extensions.	II
34 High Street; 54.46998°N 1.19310°W	—	Late 17th century	The shop is in red brick, with a stepped floor band, a deep moulded eaves cornice, and a high-pitched tile roof with stone copings and kneelers. There are three storeys and six bays. The ground floor contains a modern shopfront, and to the left is a doorway with a pediment and a woolsack carved in the tympanum. On the middle floor are sash windows with flat gauged brick arches, and the top floor has casement windows.	II
37 Levenside; 54.46897°N 1.19300°W		Late 17th century	A house that was raised in the 19th century, the lower parts are in stone on a high sloped plinth, the upper courses are in red brick, and it has a pantile roof with stone coping and kneelers. There are two storeys and three bays. The central doorway has a chamfered surround and a dated and initialled lintel. The windows are modern casements.	II
57 Levenside, wall and outbuilding 54.46850°N 1.19428°W	—	c. 1700	The house and outbuilding are in stone on the ground flor, and rendered above, with pantile roofs. The house has two storeys and four bays. The doorway has a chamfered surround and a heavy lintel, and the windows are modern casements. The house is linked to the outbuilding by a short wall on the left.	II
1 and 3 North Road; 54.47059°N 1.19258°W	—	c. 1700	A pair of houses in red brick on a stone plinth, with dentilled eaves, and a pantile roof with stone copings and kneelers. There are two storeys and three wide bays. On the front are two doorway with pilasters, the left with a pediment, and the right with a hood on consoles. The windows are sashes, those in the left two bays with wedge lintels, and the upper two of these with keystones.	II
Peaton Carr Farmhouse; 54.48209°N 1.18414°W	—	c. 1700	The farmhouse, which was extended in the 19th century, is in red brick with pantile roofs, and a long rear lean-to. The earlier part is rendered, and has a stepped eaves course, and the roof has brick copings and kneelers. There are two bays, and it contains bow windows, modern casements, and an older fixed light. The later part has two wide bays, the right one a granary and cart shed, and it contains casement windows and one horizontally sliding sash window. The granary has external stairs, and to the left is a later long byre with segmental-arched windows and stable doors.	II
32 High Street; 54.47000°N 1.19293°W	—	Late 17th to early 18th century	A pair of shops in red brick, with deep plastered coved eaves, and a pantile roof with stone coping on the right. There are three storeys and three bays. The ground floor contains two modern shopfronts, and on the upper floors are segment-headed sash windows with keystones.	II
Packhorse Bridge; 54.46924°N 1.19282°W		17th or early 18th century	The bridge, which crosses the River Leven, is in stone. It is narrow, and consists of a single round arch with voussoirs and a hood mould. The parapets are high, and the ends are slightly splayed with piers.	II
12 and 14 Bridge Road; 54.46934°N 1.19370°W	—	Early 18th century	The building is rendered, and has a deep moulded and modillion eaves cornice, and a high-pitched swept pantile roof with stone copings and kneelers. There are three storeys and five bays. The ground floor contains two canted bay windows, between which are three doorways, the middle one a passage door. On the upper floor are sash windows with keystones.	II
43–46 College Square; 54.47102°N 1.18982°W		Early 18th century	A row of four cottages in brick, the left two rendered, with high-pitched swept roofs, two in pantile, two in tile. There are two storeys, and each cottage has one bay. The doorways have reeded surrounds and paterae, and there are two passage doors. Apart from two horizontally sliding sash windows, the windows are modern.	II
6 High Street; 54.47026°N 1.19201°W	—	Early 18th century	The building is rendered and has a pantile roof. There are two storeys and two bays. On the ground floor is a shopfront with windows flanking paired doorways, and to the left is a doorway with an oblong fanlight. On the upper floor are sash windows in architraves.	II
41 High Street; 54.46957°N 1.19221°W	—	Early 18th century	The shop is in painted brick, with a bracketed eaves cornice, and a tile roof with stone copings and kneelers. There are three storeys and four bays. The ground floor contains a projecting modern shopfront and a doorway to the right. The left two bays on the middle floor have a canted bay window with fluted pilasters and an entablature. The other windows are sashes with gauged segmental brick arches and keystones.	II
19 Levenside; 54.46853°N 1.19082°W	—	Early 18th century (possble)	The house is in stone, the right return is in brick, and it has a tile roof with stone copings and kneelers. There are two storeys and three bays. The central doorway has a moulded architrave with paterae, an oblong fanlight, and cornice hood. The windows are modern casements with keystones.	II
Former Barclays Bank; 54.46994°N 1.19347°W		Early 18th century	The building is in brick on a stone plinth, with stone quoins, a moulded wooden eaves cornice, and a Welsh slate roof with stone kneelers. There are three storeys, an attic and a basement, and four bays. Steps lead up to the doorway in the second bay, with an architrave, pilasters, an oblong fanlight, and a shell hood on brackets, and in the right bay is a round-arched yard entrance with a quoined surround. Between them is a two-storey bow window, and the other windows are sashes with flat gauged brick arches and keystones. On the attic are two modern gabled dormers. In front of the basement area are wrought iron railings with finials.	II*
Manor House and wall 54.47033°N 1.19014°W		Early 18th century	The house, which is in sandstone, was extended in the early 19th century. The older part has two storeys, a double depth plan, a pantile roof, a plinth, a cornice, and a parapet with balustraded panels. In the centre of the ground floor is a doorway and the windows are sashes. All the openings have architraves, and those in the ground floor also have a pulvinated frieze and a cornice. The later part has three storeys, three bays, quoins, a modillion eaves cornice, and a hipped Welsh slate roof. The windows are sashes in architraves, those on the ground floor with pulvinated friezes and a continuous bracketed cornice, the middle window with a pediment. A segmental arcaded screen wall extends from the northeast corner of the house.	II*
Red House; 54.46927°N 1.19354°W		Early 18th century	The house, later converted into flats, is in pinkish brick on a stone plinth, with floor bands, a moulded and modillion wooden eaves cornice, and a pantile roof with stone coping and a kneeler on the left. There are three storeys and four bays. On the third bay is a doorway with pilasters, a divided oblong fanlight and an entablature. It is flanked by canted bay windows, above it is a blocked window, and the other windows are sashes with flat gauged brick arches.	II
Tanton Hall; 54.48904°N 1.19327°W	—	Early 18th century	The house, which was extended in the 19th century, is pebbledashed, and has Welsh slate roofs with stone copings and kneelers, and the older part has stepped eaves. Each part has two bays, the later part has a double depth plan, and there is a rear wing. The doorway has an oblong fanlight and a modillion cornice hood. At the left is a two-storey canted bay window, and the other windows are sashes.	II
The Old Rectory; 54.46825°N 1.18937°W		Early 18th century	The house is pebbledashed, and has hipped roofs of Welsh and Lakeland slate. There are two storeys, and two parallel ranges with three bays flanked by single-bay wings extending into bows on the south. On the front is a Roman Doric porch. The windows are sashes, tripartite on the wings, and there is one central dormer.	II*
6, 8 and 10 Bridge Road; 54.46945°N 1.19377°W	—	Early to mid-18th century	A row of three shops in brick, on a stone plinth, with quoins, floor bands, a coped parapet, and a tile roof. There are three storeys and four bays. The left bay contains a two-storey canted bay window with a sash window above. To the right on the ground floor are paired doorways with reeded surrounds and oblong fanlights, and two shopfronts. The upper floors contain sash windows with flat gauged brick arches and keystones.	II
4 High Street; 54.47030°N 1.19194°W	—	Early to mid-18th century	The restaurant is roughcast, with stone quoins, a moulded eaves cornice, and a pantile roof with stone copings and kneelers. There are two storeys and an attic, and four bays. On the ground floor is a projecting square shopfront, a central doorway, and to the right is a canted bay window. Above the shopfront is a canted bay window, and the other windows are sashes.	II
30 High Street; 54.47004°N 1.19284°W	—	Early to mid-18th century	The shop is in reddish brick, with a cornice band and a pantile roof. Thee are three storeys and an attic, and two bays. The ground floor contains a modern shopfront, and a passage entry to the left. On the upper floors are sash windows in architraves, with flat brick gauged arches and keystones, and the attic contains casement windows.	II
The Queen's Head Public House; 54.46950°N 1.19272°W		Early to mid-18th century	The public house is in painted brick, and has a parapet, and a tile roof with a stone coping. There are three storeys and five bays. On the front is a doorway, and on the right two bays is an oriel shop window. The other windows are sashes in architraves. The windows and doorway have flat gauged brick arches and keystones. There is a small modern dormer, and on the left return is a small coach house extension.	II
4 Bridge Road; 54.46950°N 1.19384°W	—	18th century	The shop is in brick, and has a parapet with moulded stone coping, and a pantile roof with stone coping on the right. There are three storeys and one bay. The ground floor has a modern shopfront and a passage doorway to the right, and the upper floors contain tripartite sash windows.	II
47 College Square; 54.47087°N 1.18970°W		18th century	The house, which was remodelled in the early 19th century, is in rendered brick, with raised eaves, and a Welsh slate roof with stone coping and a kneeler on the left. There are two storeys and three bays. In the centre is a doorway with reeded half-columns, an oblong fanlight, paterae, a frieze and a cornice hood. It is flanked by canted bay windows, the right dating from the late 19th century, and the right modern. The upper floor contains sash windows in architraves.	II
49 College Square; 54.47072°N 1.18964°W		18th century	The cottage is in brick with a tile roof. There are two storeys and one bay. On the left of the ground floor is a gabled porch, and the windows are sashes in architraves.	II
10 High Street; 54.47014°N 1.19217°W	—	18th century	A house, later a shop, with the front dating from the early to mid-19th century. It is in stone, with quoins, a moulded eaves cornice, and a pantile roof with stone coping on the left. There are three storeys and two bays. The ground floor contains a modern shopfront and a passage entry to the left, the right bay of the middle floor has a canted bay window, and the other windows are sashes.	II
12 High Street; 54.47013°N 1.19227°W	—	18th century	The shop is in red brick, with a stone moulded eaves cornice, and a tile roof with stone coping on the right. There are three storeys and one bay. On the ground floor is a modern shopfront, the middle floor has a two-light sash window, and on the top floor are two plain sashes.	II
14 High Street; 54.47011°N 1.19234°W	—	18th century	The shop is in reddish brick, with a moulded and modillion eaves cornice with strapwork between groups of three modillions, and a pantile roof with stone coping and a kneeler on the left. There are three storeys and three bays. On the ground floor is a modern shopfront and a doorway on the left, and the upper floors contain casement windows with wedge lintels and keystones.	II
16, 18 and 20 High Street; 54.47009°N 1.19249°W	—	18th century	Three shops in brick with a pantile roof. There are three storeys and four bays. On the ground floor are modern or altered shopfronts. On the centre of the middle floor is a canted bay window, and the other windows are sashes, those in the middle floor with gauged flat brick arches and keystones.	II
21 and 23 High Street; 54.46977°N 1.19147°W	—	Mid-18th century	Two shops in red brick on a stone plinth, with a tile roof, stone kneelers, and coping on the right. There are three storeys and three bays. In the centre is a round-arched passage with alternating rusticated jambs and voussoirs. To its left is a window and a doorway with an oblong fanlight and a hood, and to the right is a modern shopfront. The windows are sashes, those in the lower two floors with gauged flat brick arches and keystones.	II
36 and 38 High Street; 54.46995°N 1.19329°W	—	18th century	A pair of shops in painted brick, with stone quoins, a small bracketed eaves cornice, and a Welsh slate roof. There are three storeys and three bays. On the ground floor are two shopfronts, one modern and the other 19th-century and altered. Between them is a doorway with fluted half-columns, a radial fanlight and an entablature. The outer bays of the upper floors contain two-storey canted bay windows, and between them are single-light windows.	II
Gate and gate piers north of 36 High Street and outbuilding 54.47030°N 1.19344°W		18th century	The two tall gate piers are in rusticated stone with ball finials, and the gates are in wrought iron. The eastern pier is linked to an outbuilding with two storeys, the ground floor is in stone, the upper floor is in brick and it has a pantile roof. On the ground floor is a garage door and above is a tripartite sash window. To the north is a single-story canted extension with a blocked doorway.	II
Outbuilding to north of 38 High Street and wall 54.47028°N 1.19350°W	—	18th century	The outbuilding has a ground floor in massive stones, the upper floor is in brick, and it has a pantile roof. The doorway has a shouldered arch and a heavy lintel with a fluted keystone, and above is a loading door and a window. A stone wall runs from the building to the northeast.	II
Outbuilding to rear of 38 High Street; 54.47015°N 1.19346°W	—	18th century	The building, possibly once a chapel, has a ground floor in stone, with pinkish brick above, and a pantile roof with stone copings and kneelers, and two storeys. The ground floor opening has a heavy lintel and a semicircular relieving arch. On the upper floor is a round-arched doorway with jambs and voussoirs. On the east face are a doorway with a blocked window above.	II
53 High Street; 54.46953°N 1.19303°W	—	18th century	The shop is in brick with a Welsh slate roof. There are three storeys and three bays. On the ground floor is a doorway flanked by reeded pilasters with paterae, an oblong fanlight, a frieze, a modillion cornice and a reeded head, and to its right is a shop bow window with a stone stallriser. The upper floors contain sash windows with gauged flat brick arches, those in the middle floor with keystones.	II
60 and 62 High Street; 54.46966°N 1.19474°W	—	18th century	The house is in red brick on a plinth, with quoins, floor bands, moulded eaves, and a tile roof with stone coping and a kneeler on the right. There are two storeys and three bays, the outer bays slightly bowed, The central doorway has an oblong fanlight, above it is a blocked window, and the other windows are sashes.	II
3 Levenside and wall 54.46877°N 1.18906°W	—	18th century	The house, which incorporates the adjacent house, is pebbledashed, and has a tile roof with stone copings and kneelers. There are two storeys and five bays. On the fourth bay is a doorway with fluted pilasters, a decorated lintel and a pediment. This is flanked by bow windows, and to the left is a doorway in an architrave, with an oblong fanlight and a cornice] hood. The other windows are sashes. To the left is a stone-coped brick wall containing a segmental-arched yard entrance.	II
Garden wall north of 7 Levenside; 54.46859°N 1.18948°W	—	18th century	The wall is in large squared stones with flat coping, and is ramped up at the right above an oculus.	II
1 and 3 West Green; 54.46907°N 1.19483°W	—	18th century	A pair of houses in roughcast stone on a plinth, with a Welsh slate roof and a coped gable on the left. There are two storeys and attics, and three bays. On the front are two doorways with oblong fanlights and hoods. The windows are sashes with keystones, and on the attic are blind windows.	II
5 and 7 West Green; 54.46892°N 1.19488°W		18th century	The exterior of the pair of houses dates from the early to mid-19th century. They are roughcast, and have bracketed eaves and a pantile roof. There are two storeys and attics, and five bays. In the centre are paired doorways with oblong fanlights and a flat hood on console brackets. The windows are sashes with wedge lintels; those in the attics are horizontally sliding.	II
56 West Green; 54.46859°N 1.19623°W	—	18th century	The house is in red brick on a massive stone plinth, with bracketed eaves and a Welsh slate roof. There are three storeys and two bays. The doorway has narrow pilasters and an oblong fanlight. The windows in the lower two floors are sashes with wooden moulded architraves and stone lintels with keystones, and on the top floor are horizontally sliding sashes.	II
Garth House; 54.46814°N 1.19514°W	—	18th century	The house is in brick on a plinth with a pantile roof. There are two storeys and six bays. On the right is a carriageway, and to the left is a doorway with an oblong fanlight. Most of the windows are sashes, those in the left two bays with flat gauged brick arches, and on the left is a flat dormer.	II
Handyside House and Handyside Cottage; 54.46861°N 1.19635°W		Mid-18th century	A pair of houses in Palladian style, in brick on a plinth, with stone dressings, quoins and pantile roofs. The central block has two storeys and three bays, a sill band, a bracketed eaves cornice, and sash windows in architraves. The central window in the ground floor has a pulvinated frieze and a pediment, and the others have flat gauged brick arches and fluted keystones. The block is flanked by gabled wings with one storey and an attic and one bay, and sash windows, the lower one with a keystone. The single-storey links each contains a doorway with a radial fanlight and a keystone, and a semicircular window above.	II*
Ivy House; 54.47039°N 1.19188°W	—	18th century	The house, later used for other purposes, has a front in brownish brick on a plinth, with quoins, a bracketed wooden eaves cornice and a pantile roof, and the right return is in stone. There are two storeys and three bays. The central doorway has pilasters, an oblong fanlight and an entablature. This is flanked by bow windows, and on the upper floor are sash windows in architraves.	II
Garden walls and gate piers, Manor House; 54.47015°N 1.19076°W		18th century	The garden wall to the north of the house is in red brick, with buttresses and flat coping, and is curved at the west end. On the east and north sides the walls are in stone with gabled coping. At the southeast corner is a pair of gate piers moved from elsewhere. They are in stone and square, and have vermiculate rusticated lower courses, and a wide guilloché moulded band. The upper part of each pier has drapery swags, a cornice and a pediment.	II
Former Midland Bank; 54.46965°N 1.1915°W		18th century	The bank, which has been refurbished and later used for other purposes, is stuccoed, and has a sill band, a moulded eaves cornice, and a Welsh slate roof with stone copings and kneelers. There are three storeys and three bays, and rear extensions. In the middle bay is a two-storey bow window. To its right is a doorway with an oblong fanlight, and to the left is a small window and a similar doorway. The upper floors contain sash windows in architraves.	II
Pound; 54.47164°N 1.18870°W	—	18th century or earlier	The pound is in red brick, partly stone coped, with buttresses. The interior is stone flagged. It is a square enclosure with sides of about 7 metres (23 ft), and has a narrow entrance in the south wall.	II
Stable Cottage southeast of Tanton Hall; 54.48886°N 1.19303°W	—	18th century	The cottage is in pebbledashed brick, and has a pantile roof with stone gable copings. There are two storeys and three bays. On the west front are fixed lights and 20th-century casement windows, and at the rear are modern garage doors and a round-arched carriage entrance.	II
Tanton Bridge; 54.48783°N 1.19365°W		18th century	The bridge carries the B1365 road over the River Tame. It is in sandstone and consists of a single round arch, with an impost band and a hood mould. It is flanked by pilaster buttresses running through a frieze to a parapet with ridged ogee coping. The ends of the bridge have curved splays.	II
Tanton Farmhouse; 54.48682°N 1.19356°W	—	18th century	The farmhouse is in red brick, and has pantile roofs with stone copings and kneelers. There are two storeys, a front range with three bays, a rear wing with two bays, and a lower barn extension on the left. In the centre is a glazed porch. Most of the windows are sashes, some are casements, and all have gauged flat brick arches and keystones. On the barn are horizontally sliding sash windows, external stone stairs at the rear, and pigeon holes in the gable.	II
41 and 42 College Square; 54.47115°N 1.18988°W	—	Late 18th century	A pair of stone houses with a pantile roof, stone copings and kneelers. There are two storeys and basements, and three bays. Steps lead up to paired doorways in the centre, with oblong fanlights, Above the doorways is a recessed panel, and the windows are cross casements. The ground floor openings have keystones, and in the basement are a garage and a doorway.	II
59 and 61 High Street; 54.46954°N 1.19400°W	—	Late 18th century	A pair of shops in red brick with yellow headers, stone quoins on the right, a pantile roof on the left shop, and a tile roof with stone coping and a kneeler on the right shop. There are three storeys and four bays. The left shopfront dates from the 20th century and is arcaded, and the right shop has a plain 19th-century shopfront. The upper floors contain sash windows with flat gauged brick arches and keystones, those in the third bay blocked.	II
Leven House; 54.46811°N 1.19499°W	—	Late 18th century	The house, later converted into flats, is stuccoed, and has a Welsh slate roof. There are three storeys and four bays, and a long rear wing. On the ground floor is a canted bay window, and to its right is a round-arched doorway with a fanlight and a keystone. The other windows are sashes.	II
Linthorpe House; 54.47088°N 1.18972°W		Late 18th century	The house is in brick, and has a pantile roof with stone copings and kneelers. There are two storeys and three bays. The central doorway has pilasters, an oblong fanlight, an entablature and a cornice hood, and above it is a blind window. The other windows are sashes in architraves with flat gauged brick arches.	II
7 Brewery Terrace; 54.47018°N 1.19508°W	—	Late 18th to early 19th century	Originally a manse, later a private house, it is in light red brick on a stone plinth, with stone quoins, and a pantile roof with stone copings and kneelers. There are two storeys and three bays. The central doorway has an oblong fanlight, and the windows are sashes with flat gauged brick arches. On the right return is a round-headed window.	II
11 High Street; 54.46996°N 1.19098°W	—	Late 18th to early 19th century	The shop is in brick with a pantile roof. There are three storeys and one bay. The ground floor contains a small shop window, and to the right is a doorway with a reeded surround and paterae, and an oblong fanlight. To the left is a yard entry, and above are sash windows in architraves.	II
17 and 19 High Street; 54.46981°N 1.19131°W	—	Late 18th to early 19th century	Two shops in brick, the right shop rendered, with a pantile roof and two storeys. The left shop has two bays, and on the ground floor is a double shopfront and an entry to the right. The upper floor contains modern pivoted windows with gauged brick arches. The right shop has one bay, a modern shopfront, and on the upper floor is a canted bay window.	II
1 Market Place and building to the west 54.46972°N 1.19253°W	—	Late 18th or early 19th century	The building is in red brick on a stone plinth, with quoins, and a hipped Welsh slate roof. There are two storeys, three bays, and a bowed bay on the left return. The ground floor openings have been altered into doorways, the right with a shop window, and a modern shopfront has been inserted in the left return. The upper floor windows are sashes. To the right is a lower bay with a round-arched doorway and sash windows.	II
Flour Mill; 54.46843°N 1.19300°W		18th or early 19th century	The mill is in red brick with three storeys, and fronts of eight and four bays. It contains old doors and modern garage doors. The openings have segmental heads, and most of the windows have fixed lights.	II
Preston House and wall 54.46896°N 1.19203°W	—	Late 18th or early 19th century	The house is in pinkish brick, and has a Welsh slate roof with stone coping. There are two storeys and three bays, and a two-storey single-bay recessed on the right. On the front are two doorways, the main one with fluted pilasters and an oblong fanlight. The windows are sashes in architraves, with flat gauged brick arches. To the left is a recessed stable wing, in stone on the ground floor and brick above, and linked to it is a wall of large stones along the east side of the garden.	II
Former Stokesley Elim Church and wall 54.47015°N 1.19637°W	—	Late 18th or early 19th century	The chapel, later converted for residential use, is in brick, with a low-pitched hipped tile roof. There are two storeys, and two bays facing the road. The central doorway has a semicircular fanlight and the windows are sashes, all with gauged brick arches. Along the western boundary is a stone coped garden wall.	II
Windsor House; 54.47071°N 1.19091°W	—	Late 18th or early 19th century	The building has a rusticated ground floor, above it is in pale red brick with pale headers, and it has quoins, and a pantile roof with stone copings. There are three storeys and two bays. On the ground floor is a round bow window with reeded pilaster mullions, and to the right is a doorway with an oblong fanlight. Above the ground floor is a wrought iron balcony, and the windows are sashes; those in the middle floor are full height, and have flat gauged brick arches.	II
Woodville; 54.47080°N 1.19098°W	—	Late 18th or early 19th century	The house is in pale brick with a small wooden modillion eaves cornice, and a Welsh slate roof with stone coping on the left. There are two storeys and three bays. The central doorway has a reeded surround with paterae, and an oblong fanlight. Above it is a sash window, and the outer bays contain full-height segmental bow windows.	II
3 Bridge Road; 54.46940°N 1.19327°W	—	Early 19th century	The building is in rendered brick, and has a tile roof. There are three storeys and one bay. The doorway on the left has an oblong fanlight, and to the right is a full-height bow containing curved sash windows.	II
22 High Street; 54.47006°N 1.19262°W		Early 19th century	Formerly the Angel Inn, later used for other purposes, it is in painted brick with a pantile roof. There are three storeys and two bays. The right bay contains a full-height canted bay window. On the right bay is a shopfront, above is a two-storey canted bay window, and between the two is a doorway.	II
45 and 45A High Street; 54.46954°N 1.19249°W	—	Early 19th century	A house, later a shop, in brick, with a bracketed eaves cornice and a pantile roof. There are three storeys and four bays. The ground floor contains a modern projecting shopfront and a segmental-arched carriageway to the right. On the upper floors are sash windows with flat gauged brick arches.	II
47 High Street; 54.46953°N 1.19258°W	—	Early 19th century	The shop, at one time a post office, is rendered on the front, and has a small bracketed eaves cornice, and a swept pantile roof with stone coping and a kneeler on the right. There are three storeys and two bays. The ground floor has a modern shopfront, and above are windows with top opening lights.	II
63–67 High Street; 54.46950°N 1.19418°W	—	Early 19th century	A terrace of three cottages, later used for other purposes, in brick with a pantile roof. There are two storeys and each cottage has one bay. The ground floor has four doorways with oblong fanlights, the right one a passage door, and the windows are sashes in architraves, with flat gauged brick arches.	II
69 High Street; 54.46946°N 1.19436°W	—	Early 19th century	The shop is in brick, with sill bands, and a pantile roof with stone copings on the left. There are three storeys and one bay. On the ground floor is a square shopfront and a doorway with an oblong fanlight to the left. The upper floors are bowed in the centre and contain sash windows, the window in the middle floor tripartite.	II
71 High Street; 54.46944°N 1.19442°W	—	Early 19th century	The shop is in brick, and has a pantile roof with stone copings on the right. There are three storeys and one bay. On the ground floor is a shopfront with a central doorway, the middle floor contains a canted bay window, and on the top floor is a sash window in a wooden architrave.	II
6 and 8 Levenside; 54.46899°N 1.19412°W	—	Early 19th century	A pair of houses in pinkish brick with pantile roofs. There are two storeys, and each house has one bay. The doorways are in the outer part and have plain surrounds. The windows are sashes in architraves, and the lower floor openings have flat gauged brick arches.	II
55 Levenside; 54.46873°N 1.19364°W	—	Early 19th century	A house in pebbledashed brick, with a Welsh slate roof, stone copings and kneelers. There are three storeys, one bay, and a recessed small entrance bay on the right. The windows on the front are sashes in architraves with gauged flat brick arches, and on the right return is a canted bay window.	II
4 West Green; 54.46941°N 1.19567°W		Early 19th century	The house is in reddish brick, with stone dressings, quoins, floor bands, moulded eaves, and a Welsh slate roof with a stone coped gable on the left. There are two storeys and an attic, and two bays. The left bay has a full-height bow window, on the right bay is a doorway with half-columns and an oblong fanlight, and above are sash windows.	II
14 West Green; 54.46927°N 1.19613°W	—	Early 19th century	The house is in red brick, and has a tile roof and a kneeler on the left. There are three storeys and two bays. On the left bay is a two-storey canted bay window, to its right is a doorway with pilasters, an oblong fanlight and a cornice, and the windows are sashes.	II
16 West Green; 54.46924°N 1.19623°W	—	Early 19th century	The house is in brick with a pantile roof, two storeys and two bays. In the right bay is a segmental carriage arch, and the left bay contains a two-storey canted bay window. Between these is a doorway with slender fluted half-columns, an oblong fanlight, a frieze and a cornice, and above the arch is a sash window.	II
18 West Green; 54.46921°N 1.19631°W	—	Early 19th century	Formerly the Fox Inn, the house is in brick, and has a Welsh slate roof with stone copings and kneelers. There are three storeys and two bays. The right bay contains a two-storey canted bay window. To its left is a doorway with pilasters, an oblong fanlight and a cornice, and further to the left is a passage door. The other windows are sashes.	II
44 West Green; 54.46882°N 1.19645°W	—	Early 19th century	The house is in painted brick, with a stone moulded eaves cornice and a Welsh slate roof. There are two storeys and two bays. The left bay contains a full-height bow window. To the right on the ground floor is a doorway with a divided fanlight, and a lower passage doorway with a radial fanlight. Above is a sash window in an architrave and a blank window, both with gauged flat brick arches.	II
Bridge over the River Tame; 54.49152°N 1.18939°W	—	Early 19th century	The bridge carries a road over the river, and is in stone. It consists of a single round arch with voussoirs, a band below the parapet, which has rounded coping, and is splayed out at the corners. There is a short return wall at the southeast corner.	II
Former Bay Horse Public House; 54.46957°N 1.19222°W	—	Early 19th century	The public house, later used for other purposes, is in painted brick, and has a pantile roof with stone coping on the right. There are three storeys and three bays. The central doorway has pilasters, a blocked semicircular fanlight, and a cornice hood on console brackets, and above it are blocked windows. The outer bays contain two-storey canted bay windows, and on the top floor are sash windows.	II
Carlton House; 54.46937°N 1.19582°W		Early 19th century	The house is in pinkish brown brick, with stone dressings, quoins, sill bands, a moulded eaves cornice, and a tile roof. There are two storeys and attics, and three bays, the middle bay bowed. To the right is a doorway with half-columns, an oblong fanlight, a frieze and a cornice, and to the left is a segmental carriage entrance. The windows are sashes; those in the lower two floors of the middle bay are tripartite.	II
Martin House and wall 54.46990°N 1.19105°W	—	Early 19th century	The house, later used for other purposes, is in pebbledashed brick, and the roof is tiled with stone copings. There are three storeys and two wide bays. On the front are two-storey canted bay windows with fluted pilasters and entablatures. Between them is a doorway with a divided fanlight, the top floor contains sash windows, and at the rear is a stair window. To the east is a long garden wall.	II
Tanton Hall Farmhouse and wall 54.48856°N 1.19469°W		Early 19th century	The farmhouse is in pinkish brick, rendered at the rear, and has a tile roof with stone copings and kneelers. The central doorway has pilasters and an entablature, and the windows are modern replacements. A low recessed right wing links with a red brick garden wall with stone coping and gate posts.	II
Farm buildings east of Tanton Hall Farmhouse; 54.48871°N 1.19422°W		Early 19th century	The farm buildings are in red brick with hipped pantile roofs, and they range around a courtyard. The barn on the east side has two storeys, and the other buildings have one storey. On the front are pilasters, a stepped cornice, and diaper pattern and slit vents. The openings include segmental cart doorways, stable doors, and small windows under flat gauged brick arches, and on the barn are external stone stairs.	II
The Spread Eagle Public House; 54.46963°N 1.19214°W		Early 19th century	The public house is roughcast and has a pantile roof. There are three storeys and one bay. The ground floor has a bow window and a doorway on the right. The upper floors contain sash windows, the window on the middle floor with two lights.	II
Former grammar school 54.47069°N 1.19065°W		1832	Originally a grammar school, later used for other purposes, it is in sandstone, with a Welsh slate roof, and a stepped gable facing the road. There is one tall storey, two bays on the front and three on the right return. In the centre of the front is a doorway with a pointed arch and a hood mould, above which is a hooded niche. The doorway is flanked by windows with pointed arches, Y-tracery and hood moulds, and in the gable is a dated plaque. The right return is embattled and contains three similar windows.	II
8 High Street; 54.47019°N 1.19206°W	—	Early to mid-19th century	The shop is roughcast, with stuccoed quoins, a sill band, a small modillion eaves cornice, and a Welsh slate roof with stone copings and kneelers. There are three storeys and three bays. The ground floor has a modern shopfront, and above are sash windows in architraves.	II
15 High Street; 54.46984°N 1.19117°W	—	Early to mid-19th century	The building is in painted brick with a tile roof. There are two storeys and attic, three bays, and a two-storey three-bay rear extension. On the ground floor is a carriageway with a gauged brick segmental arch and impost blocks, and to its right is a modern doorway and an altered shop window. Above are sash windows, and at the rear are quoins to the carriage arch.	II
51 High Street; 54.46951°N 1.19290°W	—	Early to mid-19th century	The shop on a corner site is in brick on a stone plinth, with stone quoins and a hipped Welsh slate roof. There are three storeys, two bays on the front, and three on the left return. On the ground floor is a modern shopfront, the middle storey has sash window in architraves, and on the top floor are casement windows. The left return has a central doorway with a fanlight, to its right is a canted shop window, and the other windows are varied.	II
12 West Green; 54.46932°N 1.19598°W	—	Early to mid-19th century	The house is in stone, the ground floor banded, with a sill band, a top entablature and blocking course, and a Welsh slate roof with stone copings. There are two storeys and three bays. Steps lead up to the central doorway that has an oblong fanlight, a bracketed cornice and a pediment. This is flanked by two-storey canted bay windows. The windows are sashes, the window above the doorway in an architrave.	II
Former garage, Market Place; 54.46979°N 1.19262°W		Early to mid-19th century	The building is in stone with a hipped Welsh slate roof. There are two storeys, and a front of two bays, with six bays on the right return. The ground floor contains three segmental arches containing windows and a doorway, and three other doorways. The other windows are sashes, and there are three blind windows.	II
Oaklands; 54.46748°N 1.19643°W		Early to mid-19th century	The house is in stone, the ground floor with banded rustication, and a floor band on which rest end and centre fluted Ionic pilasters, an entablature and blocking course, and a hipped Welsh slate roof. There are three storeys, four bays, a later two-bay extension on the right, and a left return with three bays. The doorway has a patterned fanlight, a flat hood on cast iron brackets, and side windows, and it is flanked by square bay windows. The other windows are sashes.	II
Front range, Springfield House; 54.47299°N 1.18918°W	—	Early to mid-19th century	The building, which has been converted for other purposes, is in pinkish brick, with stone quoins, an eaves cornice and a Welsh slate roof. There are two storeys and twelve bays. The windows are sashes, and on the rear, at the ends, are round-arched stair windows.	II
Stokesley House; 54.46948°N 1.19547°W	—	Early to mid-19th century	The house is in pale yellow brick, with stone dressings, quoins, a sill band, a moulded eaves [cornice]], and a Welsh slate roof. There are two storeys, a main block of three bays, a one-bay wing to the left and a two-bay wing to the right. Steps lead up to the doorway that has pilasters, a patterned oblong fanlight and an entablature. It is flanked by bow windows with architraves and top cornices, and the other windows are sashes with gauged flat brick arches. In the right bay is a segmental-arched carriageway with voussoirs.	II
Former gatehouse, Springfield House; 54.47275°N 1.18897°W	—	1848	The building was later used for other purposes, and has been converted for residential use. It is in light red brick on a plinth, with sandstone dressings, quoins, and a Welsh slate roof with stone gable copings and kneelers. There is one storey and seven bays, the outer bays projecting as gabled wings, and the middle bay projecting and gabled. On the inner returns of the wings are blocked Tudor arched doorways. The centre bay has a Tudor arched window with a hood mould, above which is a dated plaque, and a bellcote on the gable. The other windows have alternating block chamfered jambs, and lintels with keystones, and on the outer wings are slit windows.	II
Town Hall; 54.46983°N 1.19229°W		1854	The town hall is in stone, with a banded ground floor, a floor band, a moulded and modillion eaves cornice, and a hipped Welsh slate roof. There are two storeys with a tall upper floor, an east front of five bays, and six bays on the returns. In the centre of the east front is a doorway, and the windows are sashes, those on the upper floor with architraves and bracketed sills.	II
Methodist Church; 54.46990°N 1.19406°W		1866	The church is in stone and brick, and has a slate roof. The entrance front has a coped gable with a finial, and is flanked by octagonal turrets with spires. Steps lead up to a gabled porch containing two doorways separated by a column, and above is a quatrefoil. On the front is a large window with three pointed lights, flanked by lancet windows. Outside the body of the church are curved wings, each with an arcade of four blind pointed arches, above which is a parapet ending with an octagonal turret.	II
Walls, gate piers and railings, 2 and 4 West Green; 54.46940°N 1.19563°W		Undated	Along the forecourt of the house is a dwarf stone wall containing three pairs of gate piers with helmeted caps. On the walls are low wrought iron railings with leaf-head standards.	II
