= Dromonby Hall =

Building in Kirkby, North Yorkshire, England

General information
- Architectural style: Vernacular
- Location: Kirkby, North Yorkshire
- Coordinates: 54°26′42″N 1°10′55″W

Height
- Roof: Clay pantile

Technical details
- Structural system: Coursed sandstone

Listed Building – Grade II
- Official name: Dromonby Hall
- Designated: 10 July 1985
- Reference no.: 1151365

Dromonby Hall is a historic farmhouse and former manor house near Kirkby in North Yorkshire, England. Dating principally from the 17th century, with earlier 16th-century origins and 18th-century alterations, the hall was designated a Grade II listed building on 10 July 1985.

== History ==
=== Manorial history ===
The manor of Dromonby (historically recorded as Drumundbi) is recorded in the Domesday Book of 1086 as part of the soke of Stokesley. During the medieval period, the manor was held by several families, including the Tockets and Meynell families, before passing by marriage to the Constable family of Flamborough.

During the 16th and 17th centuries, Dromonby served as a residence for branches of the Constable and Peirse families. The present hall stands on or near the site of the earlier medieval manor house, incorporating fabric from the Elizabethan and Jacobean periods.

=== 18th century to present ===
In the 18th century, the estate was divided and converted into a tenanted farm within the local holdings of the Duncombe estate (later Earls of Feversham). The building underwent interior remodeling and window alterations during this period to accommodate its agricultural role.

Dromonby Hall remains a private residence in the parish of Kirkby in Cleveland.

== Architecture ==
Dromonby Hall is built from local coursed sandstone rubble with dressed stone quoins, topped by a red clay pantile roof with stone copings and kneellers. The main elevation is two storeys high, arranged in an L-shaped plan that reflects its multi-phase construction history.

The south front retains 17th-century masonry, including chamfered stone window surrounds and stone mullions, alongside 18th-century timber sash replacements. The main entry features a stone architrave with a plain lintel.

Internally, the structure preserves its 17th-century layout, featuring chamfered ceiling beams with decorative stops, stone hearths, and a late 17th-century timber dog-leg staircase.
