= Stokesley Town Hall =

Municipal building in Stokesley, North Yorkshire, England

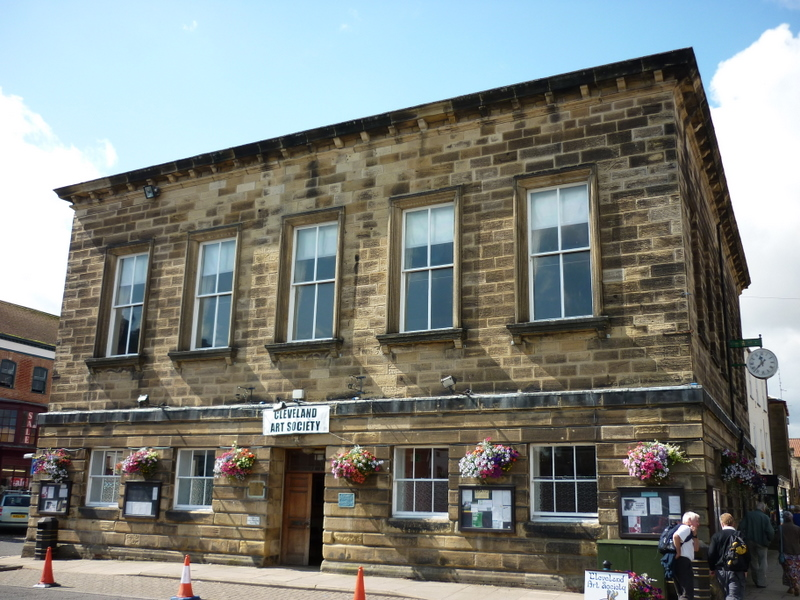
- Stokesley Town Hall

- Shown in North Yorkshire
- 54.4698°N 1.1923°W
- Location: Market Place, Stokesley

History
- Built: 1853

Site notes
- Architectural style: Italianate style

Listed Building – Grade II
- Official name: Town Hall
- Designated: 16 November 1976
- Reference no.: 1315445

Stokesley Town Hall is a municipal building in the Market Place in Stokesley, North Yorkshire, England. The structure, which accommodates the offices and meeting place of Stokesley Town Council, is a grade II listed building.

== History ==
The first municipal building in Stokesley was a tollbooth in the Market Place which dated back at least to the early 18th century; it was primarily used as a venue for the lord of the manor to hold manorial court hearings but it was also the place for the storage of a set of imperial measures, typically held by local authorities to ensure tradesmen comply with the Weights and Measures Act 1824. By the mid-19th century the building was in a dilapidated state and the then lord of the manor, Lieutenant-Colonel Robert Hildyard of Stokesley Manor, decided to replace it with a more substantial structure. The new building was designed in the Italianate style, built in ashlar stone and was completed in 1853.

The design involved a symmetrical main frontage with five bays facing onto the Market Place; the central bay featured a recessed doorway with a rectangular fanlight. The other bays on the ground floor were fenestrated with square sash windows, while the bays on the first floor were fenestrated with tall sash windows with architraves and window sills. The building was originally arcaded at the back so that butter markets could be held and, at roof level, there was a heavily modillioned cornice. Internally, the principal room was the assembly room on the first floor where a portrait of Hildyard was hung on the wall; there was also a reading room, a library for the local mechanics institute and a branch of the Langbaurgh West Savings Bank as well as a dispensary.

The architectural historian, Nikolaus Pevsner, was critical of the design and described the structure as having "no fancies at all". In the 19th century the assembly room was used for magistrates' court and county court hearings. It was also the venue for a celebratory dinner for 200 people in March 1857 when the North Yorkshire and Cleveland Railway reached Stokesley and the local railway station started accepting rail passengers.

The building was transferred to the ownership of the local parish council under an indenture dated 1919. A developer offered to acquire the building, demolish it and redevelop the site for retail use in 1965 but the parish council unanimously rejected the proposal. Following local government reorganisation in 1974, it went on to accommodate the offices and meeting place of Stokesley Town Council. A major programme of refurbishment works costing £280,000, which included the installation of a lift, was completed with financial support from Biffa and local charities, in October 2003.

== See also ==
- Listed buildings in Stokesley
