= Meynell Hall =

House in Little Broughton, North Yorkshire, England

Coordinates: 54°26′53″N 1°07′54″W

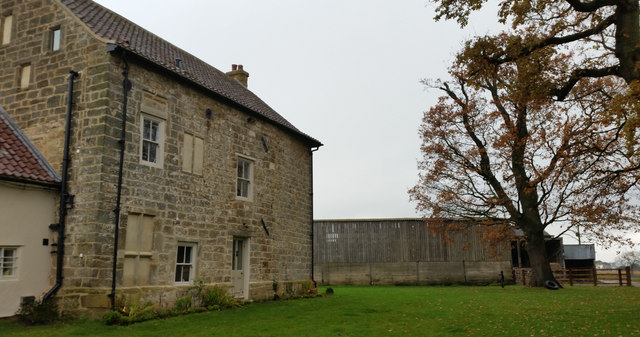
The hall, in 2014

Meynell Hall is a historic building in Little Broughton, North Yorkshire, a village in England.

The Meynell family was first recorded in the area in the 12th century. Meynell Hall was constructed in the early 17th century, as a farmhouse. The interior and windows were altered in the 18th century. The house was grade II* listed in 1990. It was restored in the early 21st century.

The building is constructed of sandstone on a chamfered plinth, with sprocketed eaves and a pantile roof. There are two storeys and three bays, and at the left is a pebbledashed wing with one storey and an attic. On the front is a doorway with a wooden lintel, and at the rear is a doorway with a chamfered surround and two blank shields in the lintel. Many of the windows are mullioned, some have been altered, some mullions are missing, and other windows are sashes. Inside is a 17th-century cupboard, and 18th-century staircase, chimneypiece, cornices and doors.

== See also ==
- Grade II* listed buildings in North Yorkshire (district)
- Listed buildings in Great and Little Broughton
