= The Queen's Head, Stokesley =

Pub in Stokesley, North Yorkshire, England

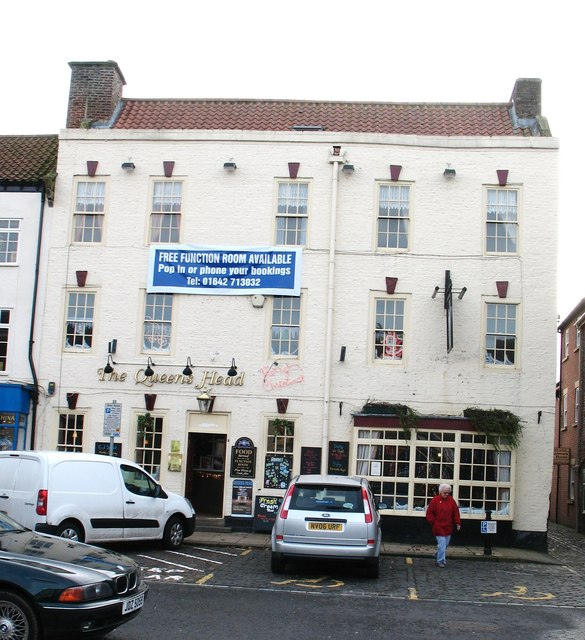
The pub, in 2008

The Queen's Head is a historic pub in Stokesley, a town in North Yorkshire, in England.

The building was constructed in the early or mid 18th century. A coach house was later added. The building was grade II listed in 1966. It was refurbished in 2023, the work including internal and external redecoration, alterations to the bar, and replacement of some flooring.

The public house is built of painted brick, and has a parapet, and a tile roof with a stone coping. There are three storeys and five bays. On the front is a doorway, and on the right two bays is an oriel shop window. The other windows are sashes in architraves. The windows and doorway have flat gauged brick arches and keystones. There is a small modern dormer, and on the left return is a small coach house extension.

== See also ==
- Listed buildings in Stokesley
