= Great Busby =

Village and civil parish in North Yorkshire, England

Coordinates: 54.443930°N 1.194280°W

- Location within North Yorkshire
- Population: 70
- OS grid reference: NZ523056
- Civil parish: Great Busby
- Unitary authority: North Yorkshire
- Ceremonial county: North Yorkshire
- Region: Yorkshire and the Humber
- Country: England
- Sovereign state: United Kingdom
- Post town: MIDDLESBROUGH
- Postcode district: TS9
- Police: North Yorkshire
- Fire: North Yorkshire
- Ambulance: Yorkshire

Great Busby is a village and civil parish in the county of North Yorkshire, England. The population of the parish was estimated at 70 in 2013.

It is near the North York Moors and Stokesley. It is pronounced great "Buzz - Bee".

From 1974 to 2023, it was part of the Hambleton District, it is now administered by the unitary North Yorkshire Council.

== See also ==
- Listed buildings in Great Busby
