= John Coates (cricketer) =

English cricketer (1828–1870)

Personal information
- Full name: John Wind Coates, Jr.
- Born: Christened 26 February 1828; Stokesley, Yorkshire, England
- Died: 7 July 1870 (aged 41/42); Scarborough, Yorkshire, England
- Batting: Unknown

Career statistics
Competition	First-class
Matches	1
Runs scored	8
Batting average	4.00
100s/50s	–/–
Top score	7
Catches/stumpings	–/–
- Source: Cricinfo, 1 July 2019

John Wind Coates, Jr. (26 February 1828 – 7 July 1870) was an English first-class cricketer.

The son of John Wind Coates senior, he was born in February 1828 at Stokesley, Yorkshire. He served in the North York Rifle Regiment of Militia, being commissioned with the rank of lieutenant. He was promoted to the rank of captain in September 1854, before being promoted to the rank of second major in June 1859. Coates made a single appearance in first-class cricket for a combined Durham and Yorkshire cricket team against Nottinghamshire at Stockton-on-Tees in 1858. Batting twice in the match, Coates was dismissed for 7 runs in the Yorkshire and Durham first-innings by Cris Tinley, while in their second-innings he was dismissed by the same bowler for a single run. He died at Scarborough in July 1870. At the time of his death, he ran a business smelting iron ore in partnership with John George Swan.
