= Listed buildings in Great Busby =

Great Busby is a civil parish in the county of North Yorkshire, England. It contains two listed buildings that are recorded in the National Heritage List for England. Both the listed buildings are designated at Grade II, the lowest of the three grades, which is applied to "buildings of national importance and special interest". The parish contains the village of Great Busby and the surrounding countryside, and the listed buildings consist of a farmhouse and a row of houses.

== Buildings ==
Name and location	Photograph	Date	Notes
Thorntree Farmhouse; 54.45307°N 1.21728°W	—	Early 18th century	The farmhouse was partly rebuilt in the late 18th century. The older part is in sandstone, and the rest is in red brick on a stone plinth, with alternating quoins The roof is in pantile with a stone ridge, copings and small curved kneelers. The main house has two storeys and three bays, and the downhouse is lower, with two storeys and one bay. Most of the windows are sashes, and there is one modern casement window.
1-4 West Row Cottages; 54.44363°N 1.20023°W	—	Late 18th century	A row of four houses in sandstone, with pantile roofs, and a stone ridge, copings and kneelers. There are two storeys, the right house has two bays, and the other houses have one bay each. On the right house is a gabled porch and casement windows, and the windows in the other houses are horizontally-sliding sashes. The doorways in the left three houses, and all the windows, have lintels with lintels.
