= 42 High Street, Stokesley =

Building in Stokesley, North Yorkshire, England

Coordinates: 54°28′12″N 1°11′36″W

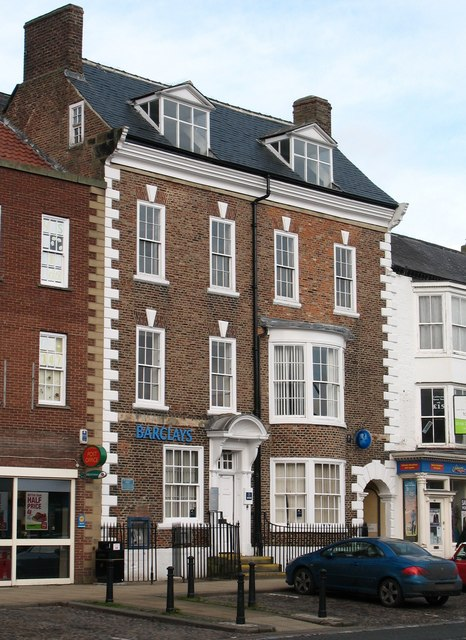
The building, in 2008

42 High Street is a historic building in Stokesley, a town in North Yorkshire, in England.

The building was constructed as a house in the early 18th century, and was altered in the 19th century. Its occupants included Dr Yeoman, the district's first medical officer. In 1938 it was converted into council offices, and then in 1953 into a branch of Barclays Bank. In 2018, the bank branch closed, and in 2025, plans were announced to convert it into a 200-seat community arts venue. The building has been grade II* listed since 1983.

The building is built of brick on a stone plinth, with stone quoins, a moulded wooden eaves cornice, and a Welsh slate roof with stone kneelers. It has three storeys, an attic and a basement, and four bays. Steps lead up to the doorway in the second bay, with an architrave, pilasters, an oblong fanlight, and a shell hood on brackets, and in the right bay is a round-arched yard entrance with a quoined surround. Between them is a two-storey bow window, and the other windows are sashes with flat gauged brick arches and keystones. On the attic are two modern gabled dormers. In front of the basement area are wrought iron railings with finials. Inside, one room has complete 18th-century panelling, including the chimney breast, and another has partial panelling of the same date. There is also one flight of an 18th-century staircase, and assorted woodwork.

== See also ==
- Grade II* listed buildings in North Yorkshire (district)
- Listed buildings in Stokesley
