= Great Broughton, North Yorkshire =

Village in North Yorkshire, England

Coordinates: 54.4494°N 1.15757°W

Great Broughton
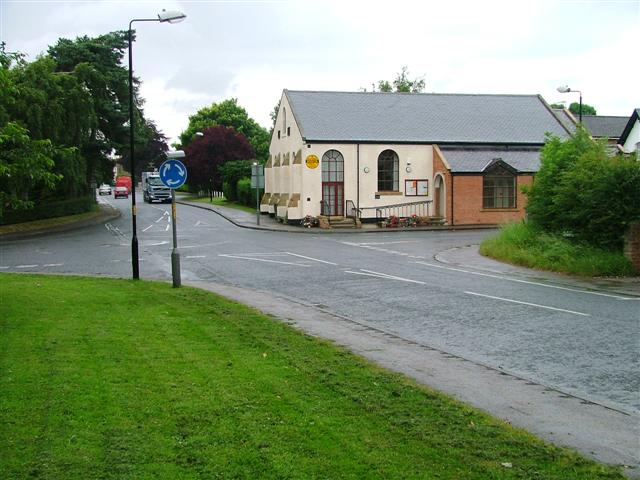
- Village Hall

- Location within North Yorkshire
- Population: 990 (2011 census)
- OS grid reference: NZ547063
- Civil parish: Great and Little Broughton
- Unitary authority: North Yorkshire
- Ceremonial county: North Yorkshire
- Region: Yorkshire and the Humber
- Country: England
- Sovereign state: United Kingdom
- Post town: MIDDLESBROUGH
- Postcode district: TS9
- Dialling code: 01642
- Police: North Yorkshire
- Fire: North Yorkshire
- Ambulance: Yorkshire
- UK Parliament: Richmond and Northallerton

Great Broughton is a village in the Great and Little Broughton civil parish of the county of North Yorkshire in northern England.

From 1974 to 2023 it was part of Hambleton, it is now administered by the unitary North Yorkshire Council.

== History ==
The village of Great Broughton and the hamlet of Little Broughton are listed (under their Latin names Magna Broctun and Parva Broctun) in the Domesday Book of 1086. The name "Broughton" is a common English placename, derived from Old English meaning "farmstead by a brook". The village was formerly part of the Parish of Kirkby, and was a part of the wapentake and liberty of Langbaurgh.

The economy of the village was formerly dependent on agriculture, textiles, and jet mining.

== Geography ==
Great Broughton is 11 miles (17 km) south of Middlesbrough centre, 13 miles (20 km) north-east from the county town of Northallerton, and on the edge of the North York Moors National Park and the Cleveland Hills. It is 2 miles (3 km) south from the market town of Stokesley and 0.5 miles (0.8 km) east from the village of Kirkby in Cleveland. Together with the hamlet of Little Broughton to the east, it forms part of a civil parish within the district of Hambleton.

The village is overlooked by the Wainstones, a rocky outcrop 2 miles (3 km) to the south, and lies on the Cleveland Way. Broughton Beck flows northward, less than 1 mile (1.6 km) east from the village, joining the River Leven, a tributary of the Tees, at Stokesley. The B1257 road, which runs north to Stokesley and south over the moors to Helmsley, is a 'scenic drive'; its popularity with motorcyclists has led to local opposition.

== Community ==
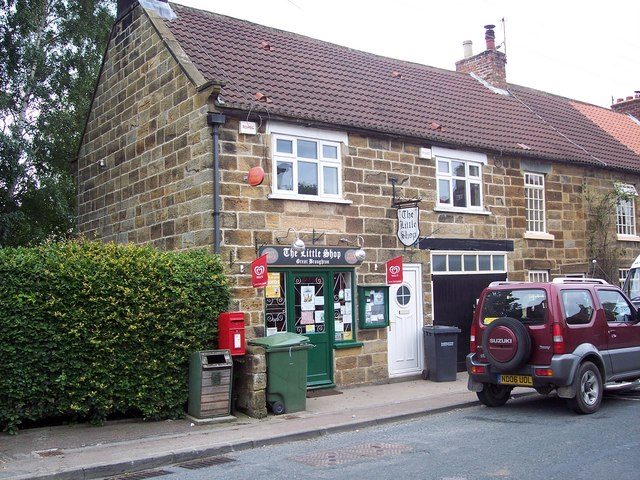
Shop and post office

Broughton and Greenhow is an electoral ward covering the area including surrounding parishes. The total population of the ward at the 2011 census was 1,669. The 2001 census put the population of the parish at 950, with the council estimating 940 inhabitants c.2005. By the time of the 2011 Census the population had increased to 990.

The village relies on tourists visiting the moors and functions as a dormitory settlement for bigger settlements of North Yorkshire. Amenities and facilities within the village include two public houses, The Jet Miners and The Bay Horse, a hotel, a guest house, a shop with post office, a Methodist church, a village hall and a children's playground. The nearest primary school is Kirkby and Great Broughton C of E Voluntary aided School to the west of the village.

Great Broughton falls within the North Yorkshire Police area. The nearest police station is at Stokesley. The village contains ANPR cameras operated by North Yorkshire Police, monitoring vehicular movements through the village.

== See also ==
- Listed buildings in Great and Little Broughton
