= Little Broughton, North Yorkshire =

Hamlet in North Yorkshire, England

Coordinates: 54°27′16″N 1°08′29″W

Little Broughton
- Location within North Yorkshire
- Civil parish: Great and Little Broughton
- Unitary authority: North Yorkshire
- Ceremonial county: North Yorkshire
- Region: Yorkshire and the Humber
- Country: England
- Sovereign state: United Kingdom
- Police: North Yorkshire
- Fire: North Yorkshire
- Ambulance: Yorkshire

Little Broughton is a hamlet in the civil parish of Great and Little Broughton, in North Yorkshire, in England.

Little Broughton was recorded as a village in the Domesday Book, although it went into decline in the early 14th century. Despite this, it was recorded in 1479 as having a mill and a chapel dedicated to Saint Mary. The mediaeval settlement lay in the field now known as Chapelgarth, either side of the Little Broughton Beck, and a few earthworks remain. The site is now a scheduled monument.

The manor of Little Broughton was owned by Rievaulx Abbey, and after the English Reformation it was sold to Robert Tempest. It was later absorbed into the manor of nearby Great Broughton.

Buildings in Little Broughton include the grade II* listed Meynell Hall.
