= St Peter and St Paul's Church, Stokesley =

Church in Stokesley, North Yorkshire, England

Coordinates: 54°28′11″N 1°11′25″W

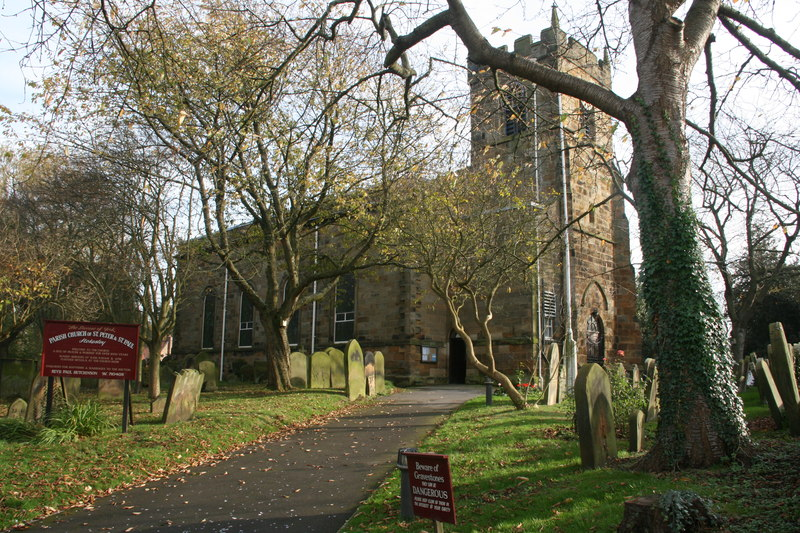
The church, in 2014

St Peter and St Paul's Church is the parish church of Stokesley, a town in North Yorkshire, in England.

The church was built in the mid-14th century, from which period the chancel and tower survive. The nave of the church was rebuilt between 1767 and 1777. The building was restored in 1875, and again by Temple Moore in 1912 and 1915. The building was grade II listed in 1966.

The church is built of sandstone with a Welsh slate roof, and it consists of a nave, a chancel with a vestry and a west tower. The tower has three stages, diagonal buttresses, string courses, two-light bell openings, clock faces, and an embattled parapet with corner pinnacles, and there is a porch in the angle of the tower and the nave. Inside, there is a memorial to Henry Marwood, who died in 1764, while the pulpit was designed by Robert Thompson.

The retaining wall running along the north side of the churchyard is built of course squared stone, and has gabled coping. It may be mediaeval and is separately grade II listed.

== See also ==
- Listed buildings in Stokesley
