= Stokesley =

Market town and civil parish in North Yorkshire, England

Coordinates: 54°28′16″N 1°11′26″W

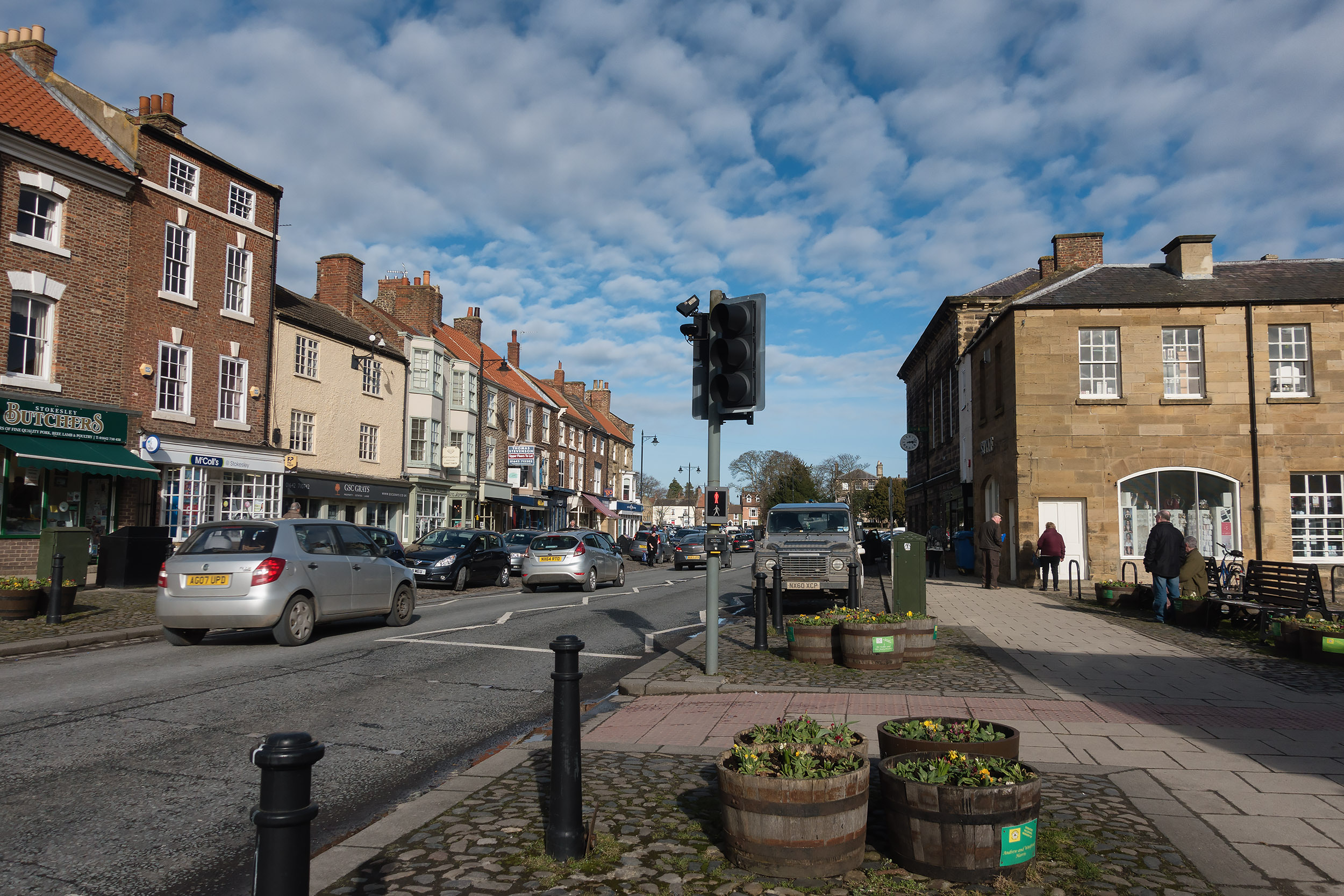
- Stokesley Town Centre

- Location within North Yorkshire
- Population: 4,910 (2021 census)
- OS grid reference: NZ524087
- Unitary authority: North Yorkshire
- Ceremonial county: North Yorkshire
- Region: Yorkshire and the Humber
- Country: England
- Sovereign state: United Kingdom
- Post town: MIDDLESBROUGH
- Postcode district: TS9
- Dialling code: 01642
- Police: North Yorkshire
- Fire: North Yorkshire
- Ambulance: Yorkshire
- UK Parliament: Richmond and Northallerton

Stokesley is a market town and civil parish in North Yorkshire, England. It lies within the historic county boundaries of the North Riding of Yorkshire, on the River Leven. An electoral ward of the same name stretches south to Great Broughton and had a population at the 2021 Census of 6,180.

Stokesley is about two miles south of the Middlesbrough borough boundary and eight miles south of Middlesbrough town centre. Stokesley is between Middlesbrough, Guisborough, and Northallerton, in a farming area. Local attractions nearby include Great Ayton, Captain Cook's monument, and Roseberry Topping in the North York Moors National Park. From 1894 to 1974, the town was one of the North Riding of Yorkshire's rural district head towns.

From 1974 to 2023 it was part of the Hambleton District. It is now administered by the unitary North Yorkshire Council.

== History ==
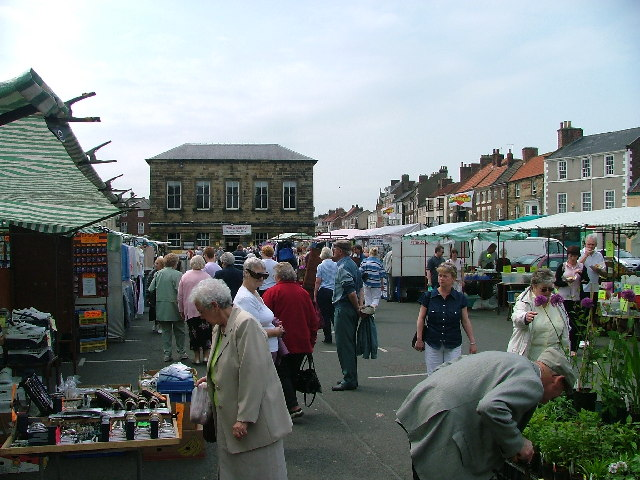
Market day with Stokesley Town Hall in the background

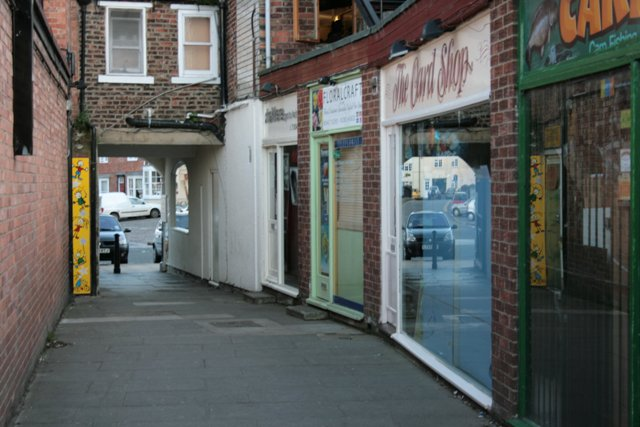
Three Tuns Wynd leading from the High Street to North Road

The name Stokesley derives from Old English and means the 'wood/clearing of Stoke', an unidentified place.

Stokesley was granted a charter to hold fairs, in 1223, by Henry III. The pack-horse bridge over the River Leven dates from the 17th century. Its large range of building types, including fine Georgian architecture, has contributed to its character. Prominent historical features include the Mill Wheel, thought to represent the site of a mill recorded in Domesday Book of 1086. Domesday also recorded "a church and priest" in Stokesley. Stokesley Town Hall was completed in 1853.

Stokesley was served by the Stokesley railway station and some sidings, on the Stockton-Picton-Battersby-Whitby branch. The station closed to passengers in June 1954, pre-dating the large scale closures of the Beeching cuts. Goods facilities remained until August 1965 when the line closed completely. The station featured in British Transport Films' "A Farmer Moves South" in 1951. The nearest railway station is now at Great Ayton.

== Economy ==
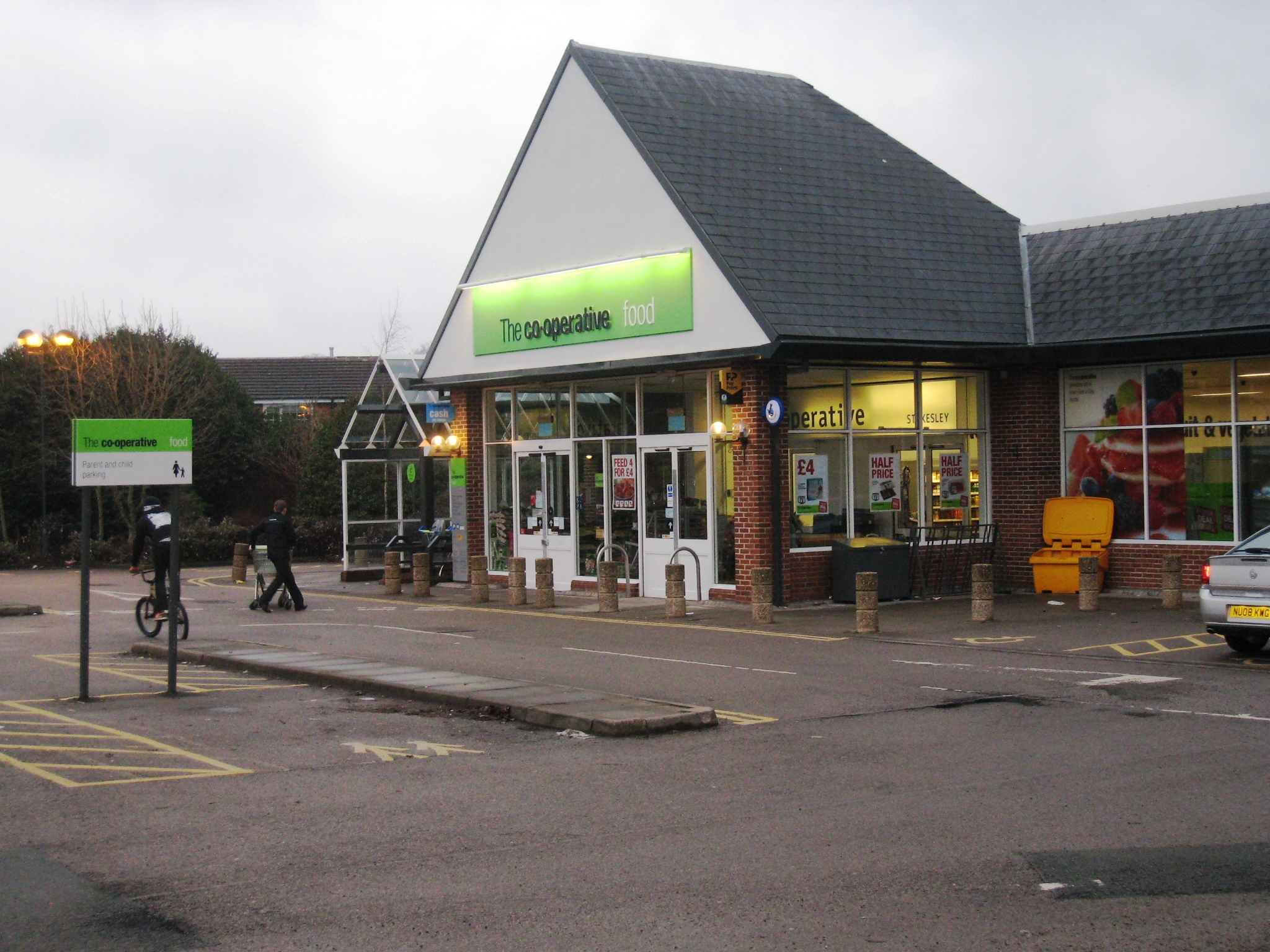
Co-operative Food Supermarket in Stokesley before refurbishment

The historic High Street is lined with independent small shops and restaurants. Other facilities include a medium-sized Co-operative Food supermarket, showground, camping site, health centre, industrial estate, library, police and fire stations. The town has five pubs (The Queen's Head, The White Swan, The Mill, The Spread Eagle and The Bank). Stokesley is also the home of Quorn, produced by Marlow Foods.

There are 80 grade II listed buildings, along with four Grade II* listed buildings of special architectural or historic interest. They are the former Barclays Bank, Handyside, Stokesley Manor House and the Old Rectory.

=== Agriculture ===
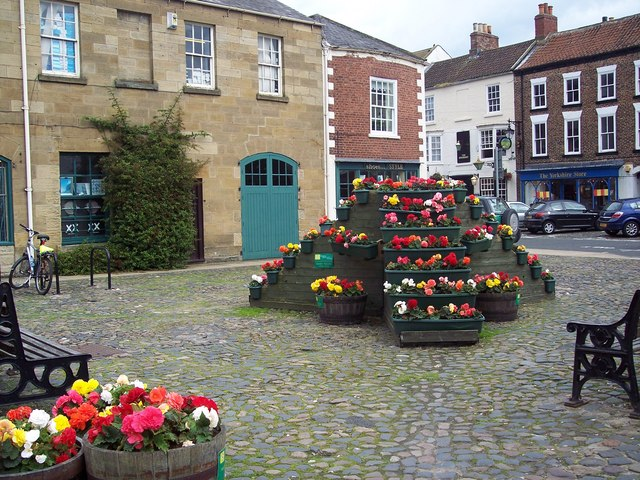
The market square

The inaugural meeting of Stokesley Agricultural Society was held at the Golden Lion Hotel, now The Leven Hotel, in 1859. The hotel was also used as the law court for the area being placed between Middlesbrough and Northallerton. Stokesley Agricultural Show, first held in 1859, is held every year on the first Saturday after the third Thursday in September (sounds odd, but historically the show was held on the third Thursday in September). It is one of the largest one day shows in the northern England. A weekly market is also held each Friday in the main square called the Plain, and a farmers' market takes place on the first Saturday of each month.

=== Stokesley Show ===
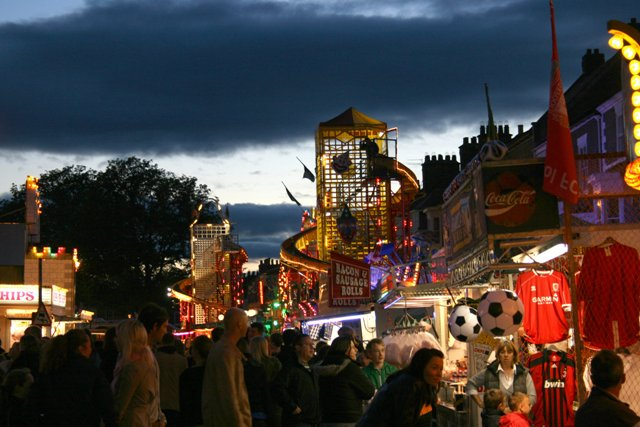
Stokesley Fair

An agricultural show and four-day fair takes place annually in the town centre. The show is always scheduled for the 3rd Saturday in September, with the fair beginning the Wednesday before and running until the Saturday evening. The fair nominally runs in the evenings apart from on the Saturday when it runs all day at the same time as the show. The fair stretches the full length of the town's high street and includes rides such as Waltzers, Miami, Dodgems and various types of Scrambler.

== Religion ==
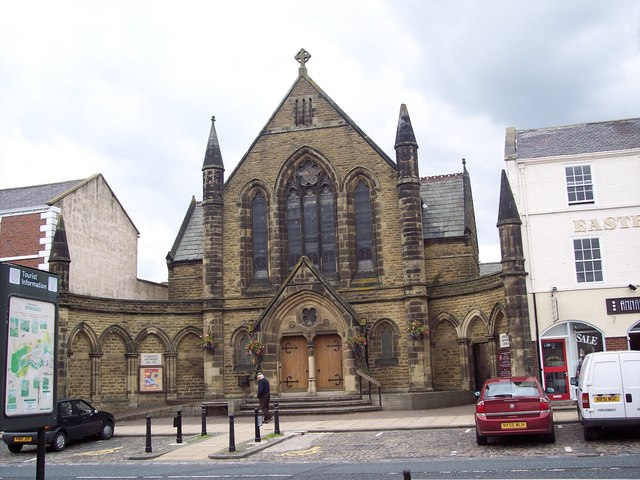
Stokesley Methodist Church

There are three churches in Stokesley:

=== The Anglican church of St Peter and St Paul ===
The Anglican St Peter and St Paul's Church, Stokesley is the oldest building in town, and is just off the Market Plain. It has a medieval tower and chancel, a Georgian nave built around 1777. It has colourful 20th-century stained glass and woodwork carved by the Mouseman of Kilburn.

=== St Joseph's Catholic Church ===
An agreement was made, in 1870, by Fr Andrew Burns, parish priest of Middlesbrough, to buy a plot of land from Henry Passman, of Hutton Rudby. Paying for the plot proved difficult, until a donation was received from Miss Apollina Bland, originally from Yorkshire, but living in Dorset. She made the stipulation that the church be named after Saint Joseph. The church was built and officially opened in 1873.

The early 20th century saw a steady decline in the fabric of the church, until 1944, when the first renovation took place. Italian prisoners-of-war worked with the parish priest, Fr MacDonnell, to replaster the walls and to lay a concrete floor in place of the rotting wooden one.

Further renovations took place in 1972/3, but were short-lived. A fire destroyed the roof in 1975 and the church was closed for a year.

In 2018, St Joseph's had a major interior overhaul, guided by Fr William Charlton, parish priest.

=== Stokesley Methodist Church ===
Stokesley Methodist Church is in the centre of Stokesley, on the High Street. John Wesley preached at Stokesley at least twelve times between April 1752 and his final visit in June 1790, when he was 87.

== Sport ==
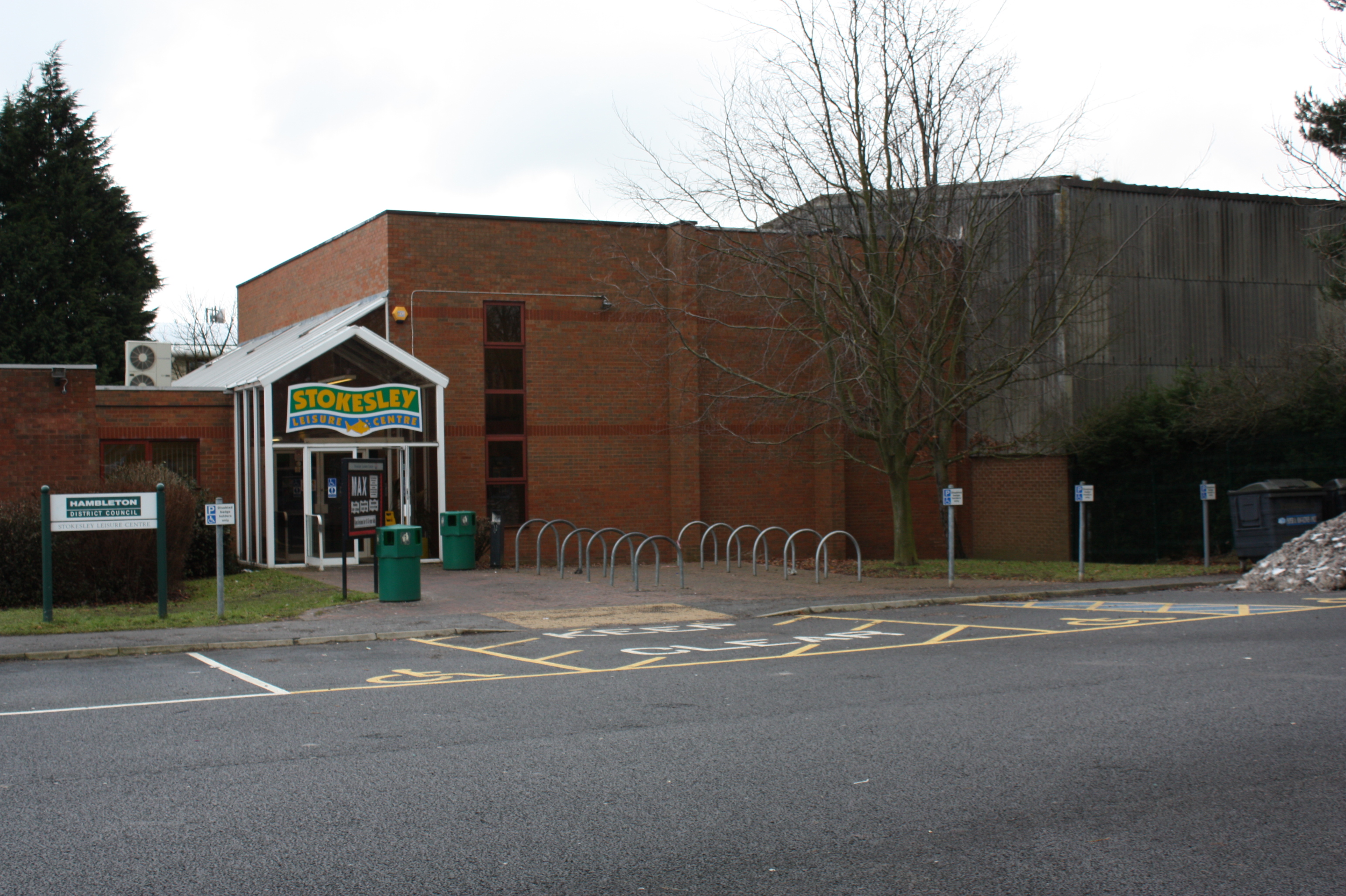
The local leisure Centre

Stokesley SC Football Club currently compete in the Northern League Division Two, which was founded in 1920. The North Riding County FA is based in the town. The county FA formed in 1881. Stokesley Cricket Club play in the North Yorkshire and South Durham Cricket League. The local leisure centre has a swimming pool and is connected to the local secondary school.

== Transport ==
Stokesley is served by the Arriva North East service 28a from Middlesbrough every hour and the 81 from Marske Estate every hour. Abbott's of Leeming run services 80/89, which run every two hours. The services operate six days a week towards Northallerton and Romanby via Osmotherley.

== Media ==
Local news and television programmes are provided by BBC North East and Cumbria and ITV Tyne Tees. Television signals are received from the Bilsdale TV transmitter.

Local radio stations are BBC Radio Tees on 95.0 FM, Capital North East on 106.4 FM, Smooth North East on 107.7 FM, and Heart North East on 100.7 FM.

The town is served by the local newspapers, Darlington & Stockton Times and The Northern Echo.

== Education ==
Stokesley Primary School was created in 1908 and extended in 1973. It has about 550 pupils.

Stokesley School, opened in 1959 for pupils between 11 and 18, was originally a secondary modern and became a comprehensive school in the 1970s. Later a sixth form college was incorporated. It currently has about 1,700 pupils. Alumni of Stokesley School include Labour politician Alan Milburn, 1988 Olympics runner Louise Stuart and Sky Sports News journalist and presenter David Jones.

== Notable people ==
- John Coates (1828–1870), cricketer
- Jonathan Ruffer, financial expert, author, philanthropist

== See also ==
- Listed buildings in Stokesley
