= NMC =

NMC or nmc may refer to:

== Education ==
=== Institutions ===
- National Music Conservatory, Amman, Jordan
- Nehru Memorial College, Sullia, Sullia, Karnataka, India
- New Method College, a defunct secondary school in Hong Kong
- Northern Marianas College, US Mariana Islands
- Northwestern Michigan College, Traverse City, US

=== Projects ===
- Network Measurement Center, a project at UCLA for ARPANET, which included the first nodes of the Internet
- New Media Consortium, a defunct nonprofit collaboration, now part of Educause
- Nordic Mathematical Contest for secondary school students

== Health ==
- National Medical Commission, in India
- Nepal Medical Council
- Nishtar Medical College in Multan, Punjab, Pakistan
- NMC Health, an UAE healthcare chain
- Nursing and Midwifery Council, UK regulator
- NUT midline carcinoma, a cancer

== Municipal organizations and places ==
- Nagpur Municipal Corporation, Nagpur, India
- Negombo Municipal Council, the local council for Negombo, Sri Lanka
- Vilnius Central Business District, also known as Vilnius NMC, a district of Vilnius, Lithuania

== Music and mass media ==
- National Hurricane Center radio station callsign, California, US
- National Media Council (disambiguation), government agencies for media
- National Music Centre, a music venue in Calgary, Alberta, Canada
- News Media Coalition, of international news organisations, for press freedom
- News Media Corporation, a defunct newspaper publisher.
- Nine Media Corporation, a Philippine media company (formerly known as Solar Television Network, Inc.)
- NMC Recordings, a UK record label
- NMC Records, an Israeli record label

== Other businesses ==
- Namecoin, a cryptocurrency
- National Motors Corporation, a fictional US automobile manufacturer
- Nissan, a Japanese motor company
- Nuclear Management Company, a defunct US nuclear power plants operator
- Nuclear Measurements Corporation, a maker of radiation measuring and monitoring devices

== Other uses ==
- Lithium nickel manganese cobalt oxides, a type of lithium-ion battery technology (abbreviated as Li-NMC, LNMC, NMC, or NCM)
- Neo-Mitochondrial Creatures, mutants from the Parasite Eve games
- Ngam language, an ISO 639 language code
- Null modem cable
