= Richard Storey =

British businessman

The Honourable Sir Richard Storey Bt CBE
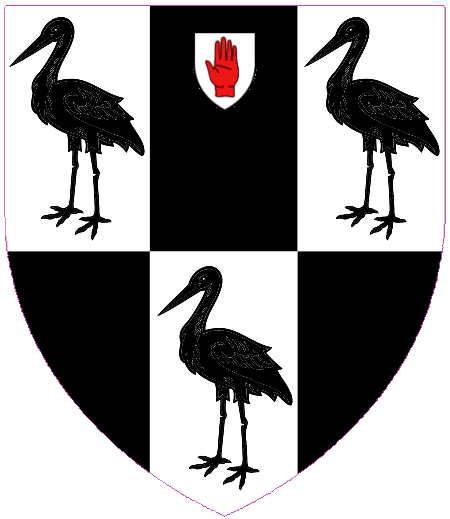

Personal details
- Born: 23 January 1937 (age 89) Westminster, London, United Kingdom
- Spouse(s): Virginia Anne, Lady Storey (née Cayley)
- Education: Trinity College, Cambridge
- Awards: Commander of the Order of the British Empire (CBE)

The Honourable Sir Richard Storey, 2nd Baronet, CBE, DL, FRSA (born 23 January 1937) is a British businessman.

== Biography ==
Storey was born on 23 January 1937 in the City of Westminster, London, the only son of Samuel Storey, Baron Buckton, who at the time was a member of parliament for Sunderland and his wife, Elizabeth, daughter of Brigadier Wilfred Woodcock. His great-grandfather, also Samuel Storey, was the main founder of the Sunderland Echo newspaper.

In 1956, Storey completed his National Service with the Royal Naval Volunteer Reserve. Having earlier attended Winchester College, he graduated BA from Trinity College, Cambridge in 1960 and LLB in 1961. He was called to the bar at Inner Temple in 1962, practising until 1969. In the 1966 general election he contested Don Valley as the Conservative candidate and also contested Huddersfield West in the 1970 general election, however both times he lost to the Labour Party candidates.

Storey was chairman of his family company Portsmouth and Sunderland Newspapers from 1973 (previously being a director from 1962 and chief executive from 1973 to 1986) until it was purchased by Johnston Press in 1998. His other press-related positions include director of Reuters Holdings from 1986 to 1992, a director of the Press Association from 1986 to 1995 (and chairman from 1991 to 1995), director of eFinancialNews.com from 2000 to 2006, founder chairman of the Regional Daily Advertising Council from 1988 to 90 (director from 1988 to 1991), member of the Press Council from 1980 to 1986, member of the Newspaper Society from 1980 to 1998 (president from 1990 to 1991) and representative of the European Newspaper Publishers' Association from 1990 to 1996.

In 1960, Storey's father was created a baronet and a life peer in 1966. On his father's death in 1978, Storey inherited the baronetcy. His other business appointments include director of One Stop Community Stores from 1971 to 1998, director of Croydon Cable from 1983 to 1989, director of The Fleming Mid Cap Investment Trust from 1989 to 2002 (chairman from 1996 to 2002), director of Foreign & Colonial Smaller Companies from 1993 to 2002 and director of Sunderland plc from 1996 to 2004. He was also a member of the Confederation of British Industry's Regional Council for Yorkshire and Humberside from 1974 to 1979 and its Employment Policy Committee from 1984 to 1988, a member of the Country Landowners' Association's National Council and Executive Committee from 1980 to 1984 (and chairman of its Yorkshire Executive from 1974 to 1976), member of INCA-FIEJ Research Association from 1983 to 1988, member of the BUPA Association from 2002 to 2004, chairman of York Health Services NHS Trust from 1991 to 1997, trustee of the Hope and Homes for Children from 2002 to 2009 and a member of Court of the University of York from 2006 to 2010.

In 1989, Sir Richard received an Honorary Doctor of Letters (DLitt) degree from Sunderland Polytechnic and was appointed an Honorary Fellow of the University of Portsmouth in 1992. From 1992 to 1993, he served as High Sheriff of North Yorkshire, was appointed a Commander of the Order of the British Empire (CBE) in 1996 "for services to the Newspaper Industry" and appointed a Deputy Lieutenant for North Yorkshire in 1998. He is also a Fellow of the Royal Society of Arts.

Storey, together with film producer Ian Flooks, is a shareholder of loss-making Wasted Management Ltd, owner of MixMag. Wasted Management, changed its name from Mixmag Media Ltd in May 2017. Analysis of the accounts show that the company has been losing between £500,000 and £1,000,000 every year for the past ten years. Recently, the directors have requested financial assistance from Barclays.

== Horticulture ==
Sir Richard lists his hobbies in Debrett's as silviculture and arboriculture and has held various business posts in connection with these, including as chairman of Sir Harold Hillier Gardens and Arboretum Management Committee from 1989 to 2005, a trustee of The Royal Botanic Gardens Kew Foundation from 1990 to 2003, a director of Castle Howard Arboretum Trust (CHAT) from 1997 to 2013 and chairman of the International Dendrology Society from 2007 to 2012. He was also awarded the Veitch Memorial Medal from the Royal Horticultural Society in 2005.

== Arms ==
Coat of arms of Richard Storey

Crest
In front of an escallop Or a stork's head erased Sable gorged with a mural crown Gold.
Escutcheon
Per fess Argent and Sable a pale counterchanged three storks also Sable.

Baronetage of the United Kingdom
Preceded by Samuel Storey	Baronet (of Settrington); 1978–present	Incumbent; Heir apparent: Kenelm Storey
Honorary titles
Preceded by Sir John Ropner, Bt.	High Sheriff of North Yorkshire; 1992–1993	Succeeded by Michael Abrahams
