= National Meteorological Center =

National Meteorological Center may mean or refer to:

- National Centers for Environmental Prediction, a meteorology center in the United States
- National Meteorological Center of CMA, a meteorology centre in the People's Republic of China

== See also ==
- NMC (disambiguation)
