= Swedish Magazine Publishers Association =

Trade association for Swedish magazines

The Swedish Magazine Publishers Association
- Abbreviation: SMPA
- Predecessor: Föreningen Svensk Fackpress and Svenska veckopressens tidningsutgivareförening
- Formation: 1997; 29 years ago
- Type: Trade association
- Headquarters: 50 Vasagatan; 111 20 Stockholm
- Official language: Swedish
- Affiliations: EMMA and FIPP
- Website: sverigestidskrifter.se

The Swedish Magazine Publishers Association (SMPA) (Swedish: Sveriges Tidskrifter) is a trade association for Swedish magazines. The organization was founded in 1997 by the merging of Föreningen Svensk Fackpress and Svenska veckopressens tidningsutgivareförening.

The SMPA represents 380 magazines, making it one of the largest media organizations in Sweden. Its members are both consumer and business-to-business magazines. Together, all the member magazines make up about 90 percent of the Swedish magazine market.

The SMPA provides market research, consultation and education for its members and also negotiates copyrights on behalf of them. The organization is a member of the European Magazine Media Association and the International Federation of the Periodical Press. It has been led by chairwomen Unn Edberg since March 2013.
