= News Media Coalition =

Group of international news agencies and publications

- Industry: Press
- Headquarters: Belgium
- Website: www.newsmediacoalition.org

The News Media Coalition (NMC) is a group of international news agencies and publications that is focused on preserving freedom of the press.

== Members ==
NMC consists of over fifty news organizations, including founder members.

- Agence France-Presse (AFP)
- Associated Press (AP)
- Deutsche Presse-Agentur (dpa)
- European Newspaper Publishers Association (ENPA)
- European Press Photo Agency
- European Publishers Council
- Getty Images
- News International
- Reuters
- World Association of Newspapers (WAN)

== Major clashes ==
- During the 2007–08 and 2008–09 seasons, disputes between Cricket Australia and the Coalition over restrictions to media rights lead to the AP, AFP, and Reuters suspending all coverage of cricket in Australia.
- After Board of Control for Cricket in India refused to waive restrictions on photo agencies like Getty Images and Action Images, NMC-led news agencies such as Reuters and AP suspended coverage of the Test series between India and England which began on 15 November 2012 in Ahmedabad after Indian cricket authorities refused to lift restrictions on photo agencies. In response this, Devendra Prabhudesai who is the media manager of BCCI, released a statement saying that board was not seeking to bar news agencies.

== See also ==
- American Press Association
- International Press Institute
- Reporters Without Borders
