= North Yorkshire =

County of England

- Ceremonial county
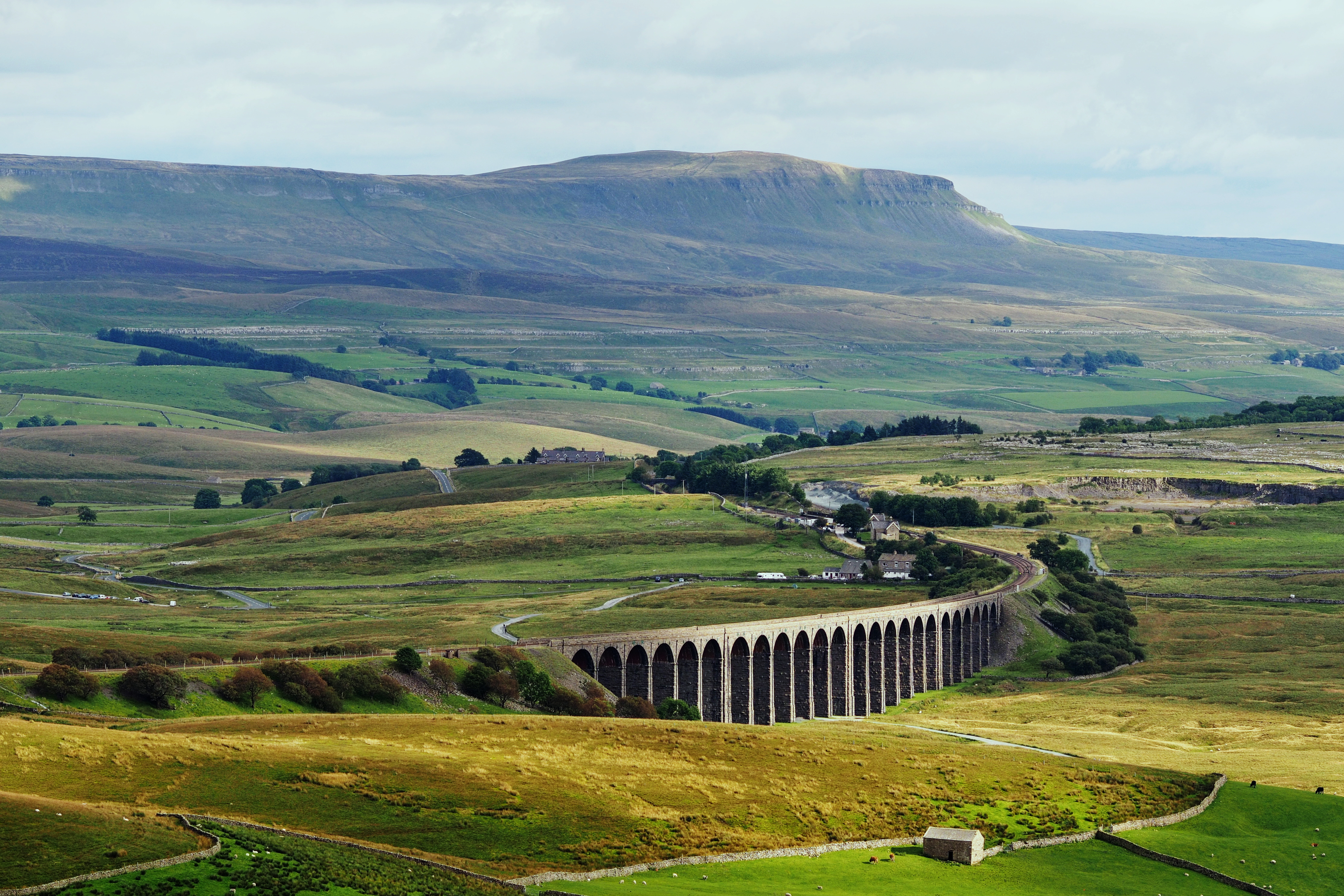
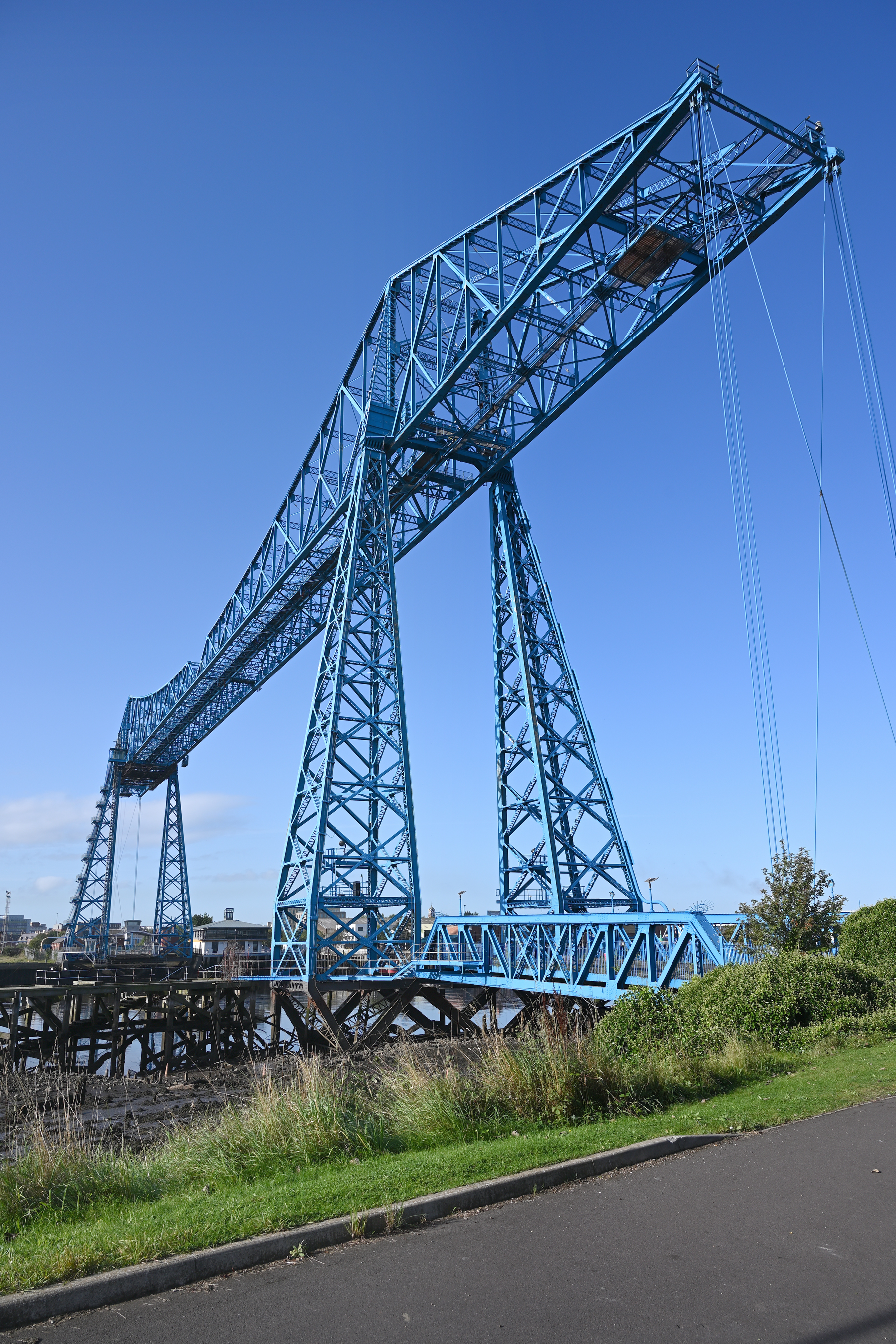
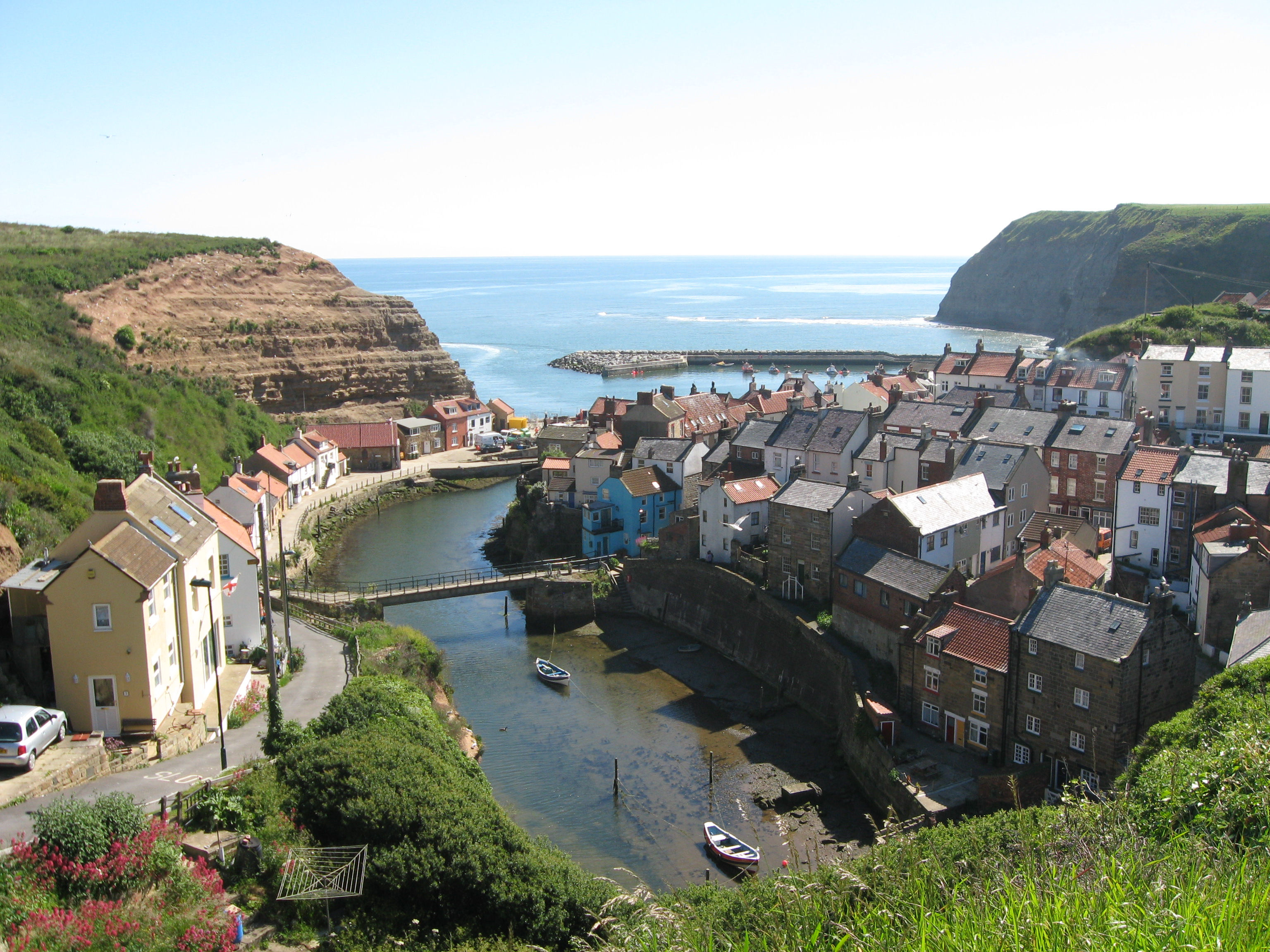
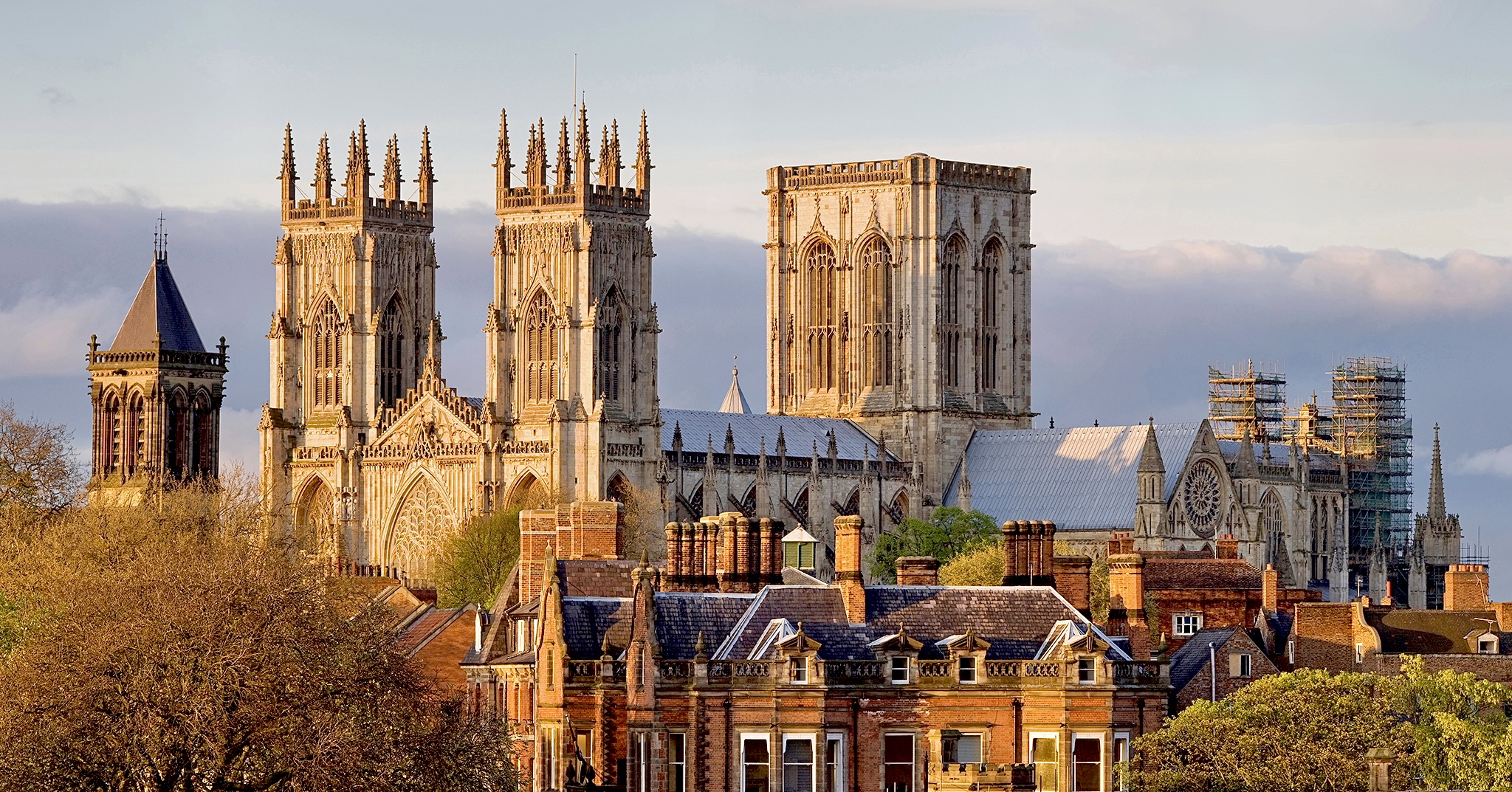
- Top to bottom, left to right: Ribblehead Viaduct in the Yorkshire Dales, the Tees Transporter Bridge in Middlesbrough, Staithes, and York Minster

- Location of North Yorkshire within England
- Coordinates: 54°6′N 1°21′W
- Sovereign state: United Kingdom
- Constituent country: England
- Region: Yorkshire and the Humber and North East
- Established: 1974
- Established by: Local Government Act 1972
- Origin: Yorkshire
- Time zone: UTC+0 (GMT)
  - Summer (DST): UTC+1 (BST)
- UK Parliament: List of MPs
- Police: North Yorkshire Police; Cleveland Police
- Largest town: Middlesbrough
- Ceremonial county
- Lord Lieutenant: Johanna Ropner
- High Sheriff: Nigel Frederick Hartley Corner
- Area: 8,654 km^{2} (3,341 sq mi)
  - Rank: 1st of 48
- Population (2024): 1,201,415
  - Rank: 14th of 48
  - Density: 139/km^{2} (360/sq mi)
- Districts
- Districts of North Yorkshire
- Districts: Unitary: 1. North Yorkshire; 2. Redcar and Cleveland; 3. Middlesbrough; 4. Stockton-on-Tees (south); 5. York

North Yorkshire is a ceremonial county in Northern England. (Note: The unitary authority areas of York and North Yorkshire are in Yorkshire and the Humber, and Middlesbrough, Redcar and Cleveland, and Stockton-on-Tees are in North East England.) It is bordered by County Durham to the north, the North Sea to the east, the East Riding of Yorkshire to the south-east, South Yorkshire to the south, West Yorkshire to the south-west, and Cumbria and Lancashire to the west.

The county is the largest in England by land area, at 8,654 km^{2} (3,341 sq mi), and had an estimated population of 1,201,415 in 2024. Middlesbrough and Redcar are located in the north-east of the county and form part of the Teesside conurbation, which extends into County Durham. The city of York is located in the south. The remainder of the county is rural, and its settlements include Harrogate in the south-west, the city of Ripon near the centre, and Scarborough on the coast in the east. For local government purposes the county comprises the unitary authority areas of North Yorkshire, Middlesbrough, Redcar and Cleveland, York, and part of Stockton-on-Tees. The local authorities of York and North Yorkshire form a combined authority of the same name, and the local authorities of the other three areas are part of the Tees Valley Combined Authority. The county was created in 1974 from the majority of the North Riding of Yorkshire, the northern part of the West Riding, the county borough of York, and the northern and eastern edges of the East Riding.

The centre of the county contains a wide plain, called the Vale of Mowbray in the north and Vale of York in the south. The North York Moors uplands lie to the east, and south of them the Vale of Pickering is separated from the main plain by the Howardian Hills. Further east, the county has a coastline on the North Sea. The west of the county contains the Yorkshire Dales, an extensive upland area which contains the source of the River Ouse/Ure and many of its tributaries, which together drain most of the county before reaching the Humber estuary in the south. The Dales also contain the county's highest point, Whernside, at 2,415 feet (736 m).

== Geography ==
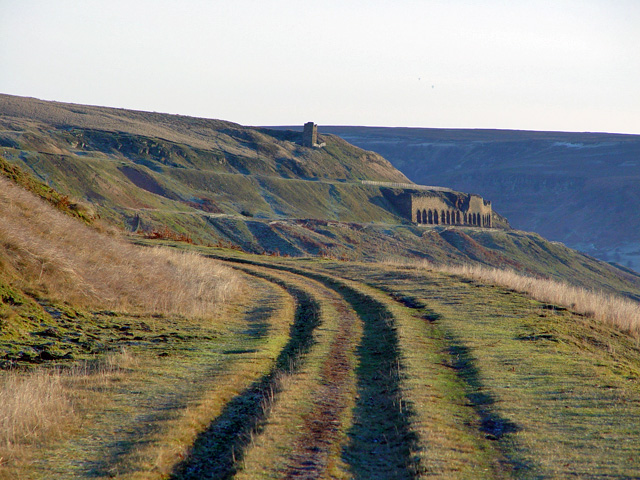
Rosedale, in the North York Moors

The geology of North Yorkshire is closely reflected in its landscape. Within the county are the North York Moors and most of the Yorkshire Dales, two of eleven areas in England and Wales to be designated national parks. Between the North York Moors in the east and the Pennine Hills. The highest point is Whernside, on the Cumbrian border, at 2,415 feet (736 m). A distinctive hill to the far north east of the county is Roseberry Topping.

North Yorkshire contains several major rivers. The River Tees is the most northerly, forming part of the border between North Yorkshire and County Durham in its lower reaches and flowing east through Teesdale before reaching the North Sea near Redcar. The Yorkshire Dales are the source of many of the county's major rivers, including the Aire, Lune, Ribble, Swale, Ure, and Wharfe. The Aire, Swale, and Wharfe are tributaries of the Ure/Ouse, which at 208 km (129 mi) long is the sixth-longest river in the United Kingdom. The river is called the Ure until it meets Ouse Gill beck just below the village of Great Ouseburn, where it becomes the Ouse and flows south before exiting the county near Goole and entering the Humber estuary. The North York Moors are the catchment for a number of rivers: the Leven which flows north into the Tees between Yarm and Ingleby Barwick; the Esk flows east directly into the North Sea at Whitby as well as the Rye (which later becomes the Derwent at Malton) flows south into the River Ouse at Goole.

The county is less than 10 miles from Morecambe Bay at its closest point.

=== Urban to rural Green belt ===
North Yorkshire contains a small section of green belt in the south of the county, which surrounds the neighbouring metropolitan area of Leeds along the North and West Yorkshire borders. It extends to the east to cover small communities such as Huby, Kirkby Overblow, and Follifoot before covering the gap between the towns of Harrogate and Knaresborough, helping to keep those towns separate. The belt extends into the western area of the former Selby district, reaching as far as Tadcaster and Balne. The belt was first drawn up from the 1950s.

The city of York has an independent surrounding belt area affording protections to several outlying settlements such as Haxby and Dunnington, and it too extends into the surrounding county.

=== Protected landscapes ===
North Yorkshire includes all or most of four nationally protected landscapes, and smaller parts of two more protected landscapes. The Yorkshire Dales National Park adjoins the South and West Yorkshire Green Belt in the south and extends across the county into Cumbria and Lancashire in the north and west. The North York Moors National Park, the Nidderdale National Landscape (adjoining the green belt in the south and the Yorkshire Dales National Park in the west) and the Howardian Hills National Landscape are wholly within the county. Part of the Forest of Bowland National Landscape, and a small part of the North Pennines National Landscape, are also within the county.

=== Climate ===
North Yorkshire has a temperate oceanic climate, like most of the UK. There are large climate variations within the county. The upper Pennines border on a Subarctic climate. Overall, with the county being situated in the east, it receives below-average rainfall for the UK. Inside North Yorkshire, the upper Dales of the Pennines are one of the wettest parts of England, where in contrast the driest parts of the Vale of Mowbray are some of the driest areas in the UK.

Summer temperatures are above average, at 22 °C. Highs can regularly reach up to 28 °C, with over 30 °C reached in heat waves. Winter temperatures are below average, with average lows of 1 °C. Snow and fog can be expected depending on location. The North York Moors and Pennines have snow lying for an average of between 45 and 75 days per year. Sunshine is most plentiful on the coast, receiving an average of 1,650 hours per year. It reduces further west in the county, with the Pennines receiving 1,250 hours per year.

Climate data for North Yorkshire
Month	Jan	Feb	Mar	Apr	May	Jun	Jul	Aug	Sep	Oct	Nov	Dec	Year
Record high °C (°F)	15 (59)	17 (63)	21 (70)	24 (75)	29 (84)	32 (90)	40 (104)	33 (91)	29 (84)	28 (82)	19 (66)	16 (61)	40 (104)
Mean daily maximum °C (°F)	6 (43)	7 (45)	10 (50)	13 (55)	16 (61)	19 (66)	22 (72)	22 (72)	18 (64)	14 (57)	10 (50)	7 (45)	14 (57)
Mean daily minimum °C (°F)	1 (34)	1 (34)	2 (36)	4 (39)	7 (45)	10 (50)	12 (54)	12 (54)	10 (50)	7 (45)	4 (39)	1 (34)	6 (43)
Record low °C (°F)	−14 (7)	−10 (14)	−13 (9)	−3 (27)	−1 (30)	2 (36)	5 (41)	4 (39)	−1 (30)	−7 (19)	−14 (7)	−19 (−2)	−19 (−2)
Average precipitation mm (inches)	40 (1.6)	35 (1.4)	43 (1.7)	46 (1.8)	42 (1.7)	47 (1.9)	51 (2.0)	59 (2.3)	53 (2.1)	62 (2.4)	56 (2.2)	59 (2.3)	593 (23.3)

== Governance ==
=== Local ===
Since 2023, North Yorkshire has comprised the unitary authority areas of Middlesbrough, North Yorkshire, Redcar and Cleveland, York, and the part of Stockton-on-Tees that is south of the River Tees. Their councils are unitary authorities, meaning they combine the powers and responsibilities of a non-metropolitan county council and a non-metropolitan district council.

A summary of the councils is as follows:

- The City of York Council is based within the city, having its council chamber at the Guildhall and its main office at York old railway station. It has 47 councillors and, following the 2023 City of York Council election, has a Labour majority administration.
- Middlesbrough Council is based at Middlesbrough Town Hall. It has 47 councillors and, following the 2023 Middlesbrough Council election, has a majority Labour administration.
- North Yorkshire Council is based at County Hall, Northallerton. It has 90 councillors, and since 2023 has had a minority Conservative administration.
- Redcar and Cleveland Borough Council has 59 councillors and, following the 2023 Redcar and Cleveland Borough Council election, has a minority Labour administration.
- Stockton-on-Tees Borough Council has its chamber at Stockton-on-Tees Town Hall and offices at Dunedin House in Thornaby-on-Tees. It has 56 councillors and, following the 2023 Stockton-on-Tees Borough Council election, has a minority Labour administration.

The ceremonial county itself has only a minor administrative function, being the area to which the Lord Lieutenant of North Yorkshire is appointed; the shrieval county has the same boundaries and is the area to which the High Sheriff of North Yorkshire is appointed.

==== History ====
The Local Government Act 1888 reformed English local government by creating administrative counties, county boroughs, and elected county councils and county borough councils to govern them. County boroughs largely consisted of those settlements with a population over 50,000, and administrative counties covered smaller towns and rural areas. The three ridings of Yorkshire were reconstituted as the administrative counties of County of York, East Riding, County of York, North Riding, and County of York, West Riding. Within what would later become North Yorkshire, Middlesbrough and York were made county boroughs. In 1967, the county borough of Middlesbrough was abolished and replaced with the larger county borough of Teesside, which included Stockton-on-Tees, Redcar, and other surrounding areas.

The Local Government Act 1972, which came into effect in 1974, reformed English local government again. It introduced metropolitan counties, which covered the largest urban areas, and non-metropolitan counties elsewhere. Both types of county were divided into districts, with local government functions divided between a county council and district councils. The non-metropolitan county of North Yorkshire was created from the majority of the North Riding, the northern part of the West Riding, the county borough of York, and parts of the northern and eastern edges of the East Riding including Filey and Norton-on-Derwent. The area in the north-east around the lower reaches of the River Tees, including Middlesbrough, became part of the new county of Cleveland. North Yorkshire was divided into eight districts: Craven, Hambleton, Harrogate, Richmondshire, Ryedale, Scarborough, Selby, and York. The provision of local government services was divided between North Yorkshire County Council and the district councils of the eight non-metropolitan districts.

In 1996, Cleveland was abolished. Its districts became unitary authority areas, their councils having the powers of a non-metropolitan county council and non-metropolitan district council. Middlesbrough, Redcar and Cleveland, and the part of Stockton-on-Tees south of the River Tees became part of North Yorkshire for ceremonial purposes. In the same year, the district of York was enlarged by taking in parishes from the Harrogate, Ryedale and Selby districts, and also became a unitary authority area.

In 2023, the non-metropolitan county of North Yorkshire became a unitary authority area. The remaining seven districts were abolished and the county council took on the responsibilities of the district councils, renaming itself North Yorkshire Council as part of the restructuring process.

=== Regional ===
Combined authorities allow two or more councils to collaborate across local authority boundaries, and to receive a devolution deal from the Government of the United Kingdom. The councils of North Yorkshire participate in two separate combined authorities.

The Tees Valley Combined Authority was created in 2016. Its members are Darlington Borough Council, Hartlepool Borough Council, Middlesbrough Council, Redcar and Cleveland Borough Council, and Stockton-on-Tees Borough Council. The authority is led by the Tees Valley Mayor, who since the first election to the position in 2017 has been Ben Houchen of the Conservative Party.

The York and North Yorkshire Combined Authority was created in February 2024, and its members are the City of York Council and North Yorkshire Council. The authority is led by the Mayor of York and North Yorkshire. The first election to the position took place in 2024, and resulted in David Skaith of the Labour Party being elected. Both North Yorkshire Council and the combined authority are governed from County Hall, Northallerton.

== Economy ==
In large areas of North Yorkshire, agriculture is the primary source of employment. Approximately 85% of the county is considered to be "rural or super sparse".

Other sectors in 2019 included some manufacturing, the provision of accommodation and meals (primarily for tourists) which accounted for 19% of all jobs. Food manufacturing employed 11% of workers. A few people are involved in forestry and fishing in 2019. The average weekly earnings in 2018 were £531. Some 15% of workers declared themselves as self-employed. One report in late 2020 stated that "North Yorkshire has a relatively healthy and diverse economy which largely mirrors the national picture in terms of productivity and jobs.

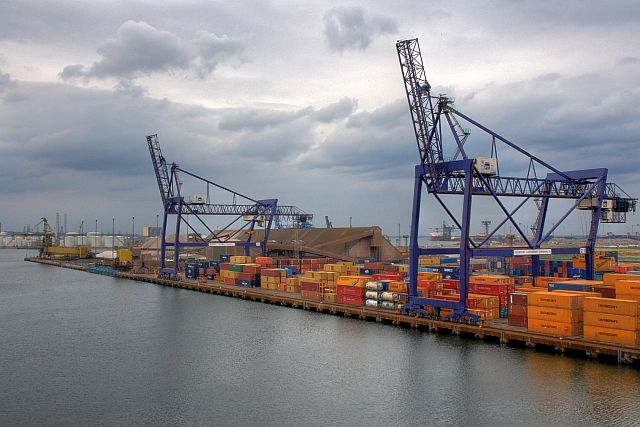
The Teesport sea port handled over 53 million tonnes of cargo in 2013.

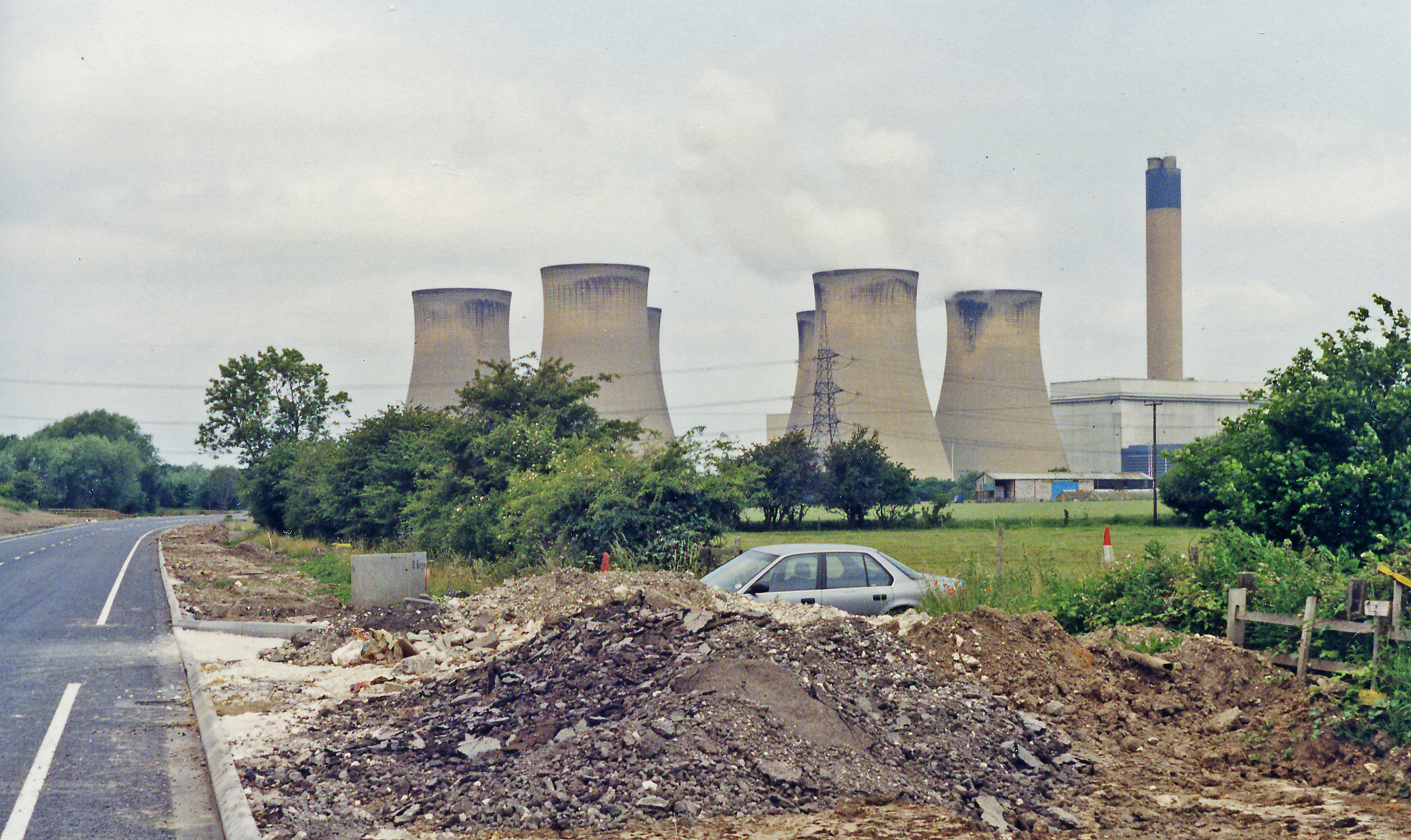
Drax Power Station has the highest generating capacity of any power station in the UK.

Mineral extraction and power generation are also sectors of the economy, as is high technology.

Tourism is a significant contributor to the economy. A study of visitors between 2013 and 2015 indicated that the Borough of Scarborough, including Filey, Whitby and parts of the North York Moors National Park, received 1.4m trips per year on average. A 2016 report by the National Park, states the park area gets 7.93 million visitors annually, generating £647 million and supporting 10,900 full-time equivalent jobs.

The Yorkshire Dales have also attracted many visitors. In 2016, there were 3.8 million visits to the National Park including 0.48 million who stayed at least one night. The parks service estimates that this contributed £252 million to the economy and provided 3,583 full-time equivalent jobs. The wider Yorkshire Dales area received 9.7 million visitors who contributed £644 million to the economy. The North York Moors and Yorkshire Dales are among England's best known destinations.

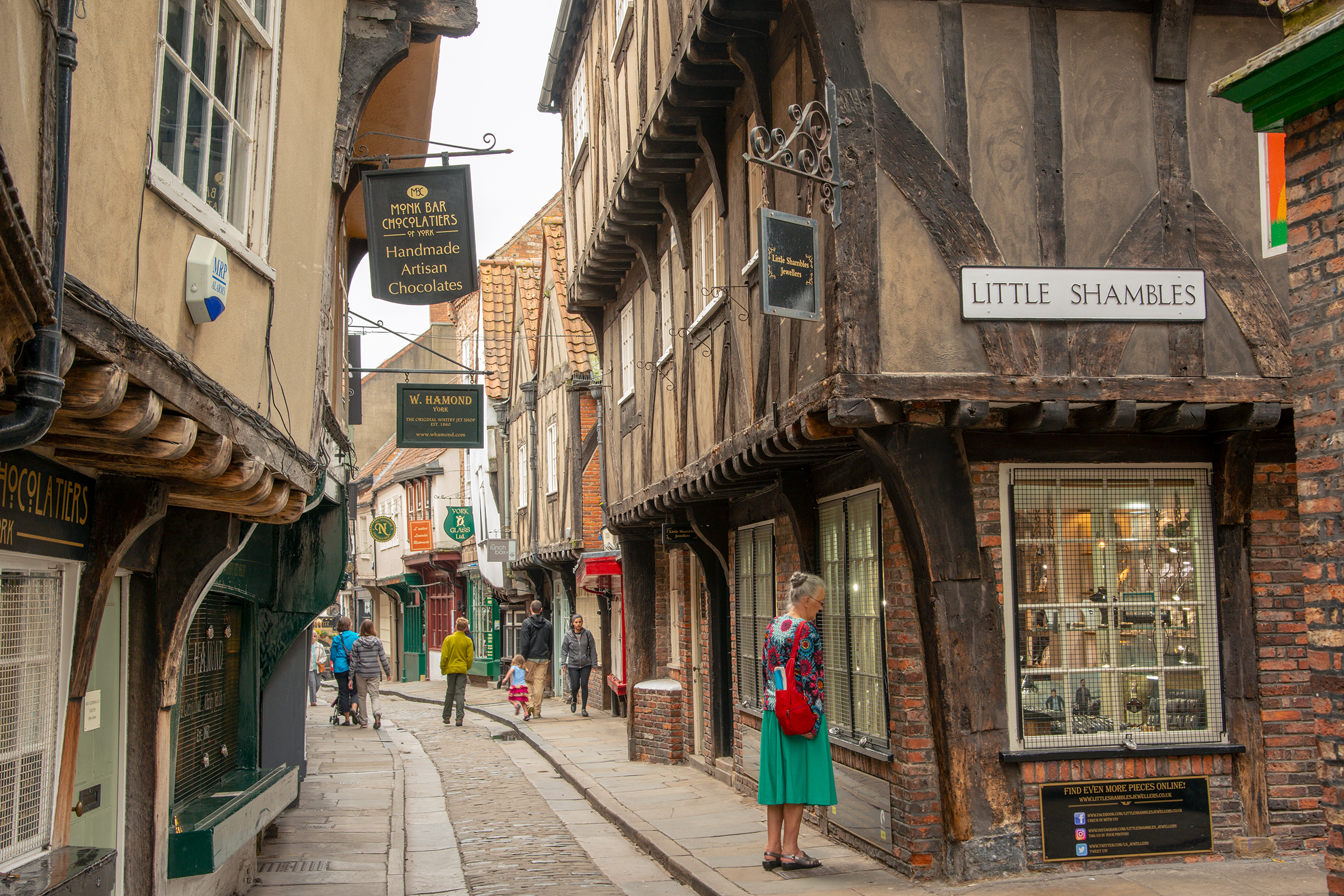
The Shambles, a popular tourist area in York

York is a popular tourist destination. A 2014 report, based on 2012 data, stated that York alone receives 6.9 million visitors annually; they contribute £564 million to the economy and support over 19,000 jobs. In the 2017 Condé Nast Traveller survey of readers, York rated 12th among The 15 Best Cities in the UK for visitors. In a 2020 Condé Nast Traveller report, York rated as the sixth best among ten "urban destinations [in the UK] that scored the highest marks when it comes to ... nightlife, restaurants and friendliness".

During February 2020 to January 2021, the average property in North Yorkshire county sold for £240,000, up by £8100 over the previous 12 months. By comparison, the average for England and Wales was £314,000. In certain communities of North Yorkshire, however, house prices were higher than average for the county, as of early 2021: Harrogate (average value: £376,195), Knaresborough (£375,625), Tadcaster (£314,278), Leyburn (£309,165) and Ripon (£299,998), for example.

This is a chart of trend of regional gross value added for North Yorkshire at current basic prices with figures in millions of British pounds sterling.

Year	Regional Gross Value Added (Note: Components may not sum to totals due to rounding)	Agriculture (Note: includes hunting and forestry)	Industry (Note: includes energy and construction)	Services (Note: includes financial intermediation services indirectly measured)
1995	7,278	478	2,181	4,618
2000	9,570	354	2,549	6,667
2003	11,695	390	3,025	8,281

=== Effects of the pandemic ===
Unemployment in the county was traditionally low in recent years, but the lockdowns and travel restrictions necessitated by the COVID-19 pandemic had a negative effect on the economy during much of 2020 and into 2021. The UK government said in early February 2021 that it was planning "unprecedented levels of support to help businesses [in the UK] survive the crisis".

York experienced high unemployment during lockdown periods. One analysis (by the York and North Yorkshire Local Enterprise Partnership) predicted in August 2020 that "as many as 13,835 jobs in York will be lost in the scenario considered most likely, taking the city's unemployment rate to 14.5%". Some critics suggested that part of the problem was caused by "over-reliance on the booming tourism industry at the expense of a long-term economic plan". A report in mid June 2020 stated that unemployment had risen 114% over the previous year because of restrictions imposed as a result of the pandemic.

Tourism in the county was expected to increase after the restrictions imposed during the pandemic were relaxed. One reason for the expected increase is the airing of All Creatures Great and Small, a TV series about the vet James Herriot, based on a successful series of books; it was largely filmed within the Yorkshire Dales National Park. The show aired in the UK in September 2020 and in the US in early 2021. One source stated that visits to Yorkshire websites had increased significantly by late September 2020.

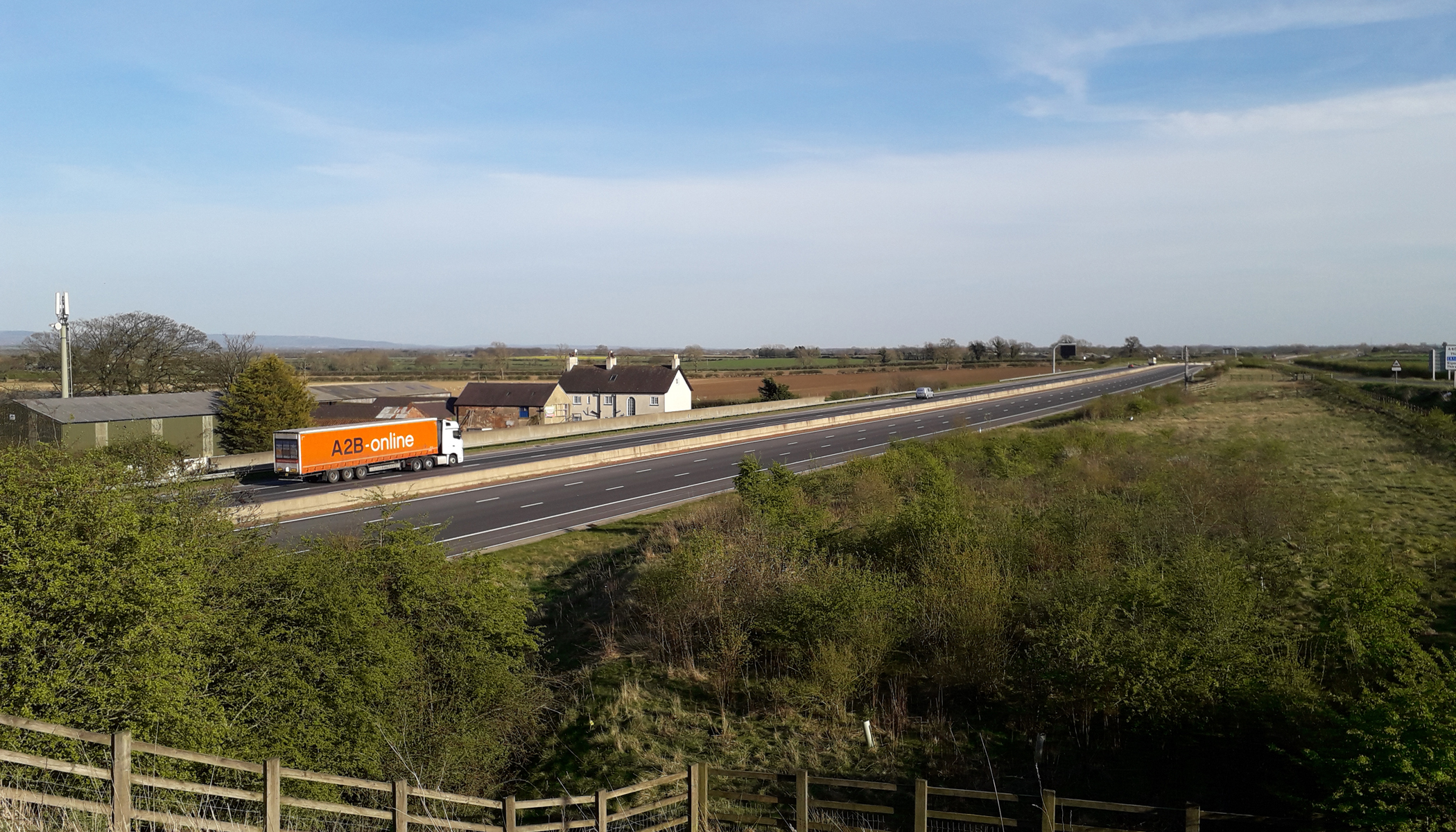
Image taken at 17:29 on 7 April 2020 at Leeming in North Yorkshire, overlooking the A1(M)

The lockdowns affected traffic volumes across the regions roads, which was also mirrored in road accidents, which totalled 948 in 2020, a drop of 7% on the previous year which had 1,021 accidents. Additionally, miles travelled by all types of vehicle dropped, with cars having the largest drop, LCV and HGV less so, but pedal bicycle usage slightly increased.

Post-pandemic health effects included children worrying more about life and whether a family member would die. A public health report detailed how 76% of children worried daily in 2014, and by 2018, this had dropped to 61%. By 2024, this had risen again to 86%.

== Transport ==
=== Bridges ===
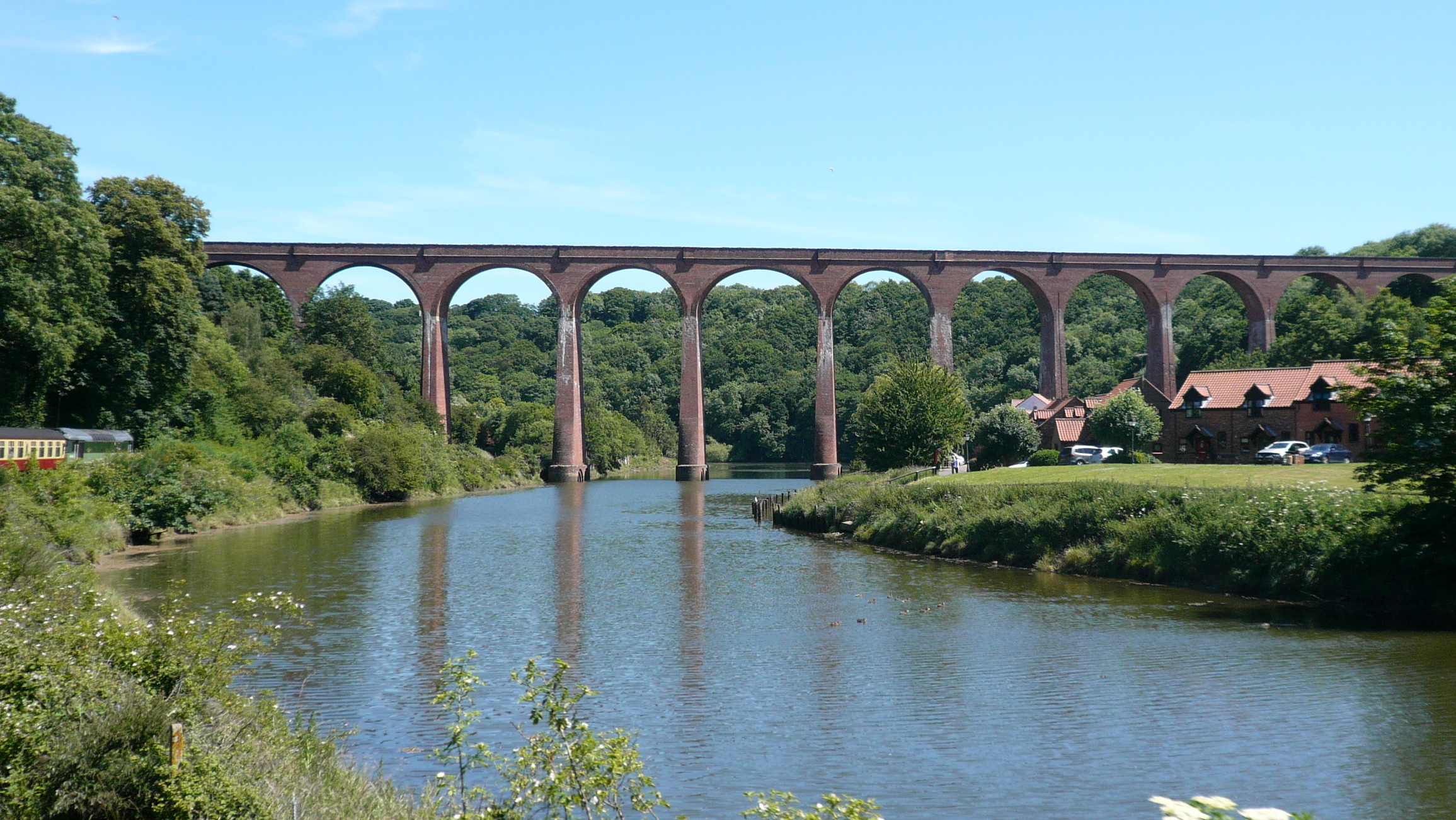
Larpool Viaduct

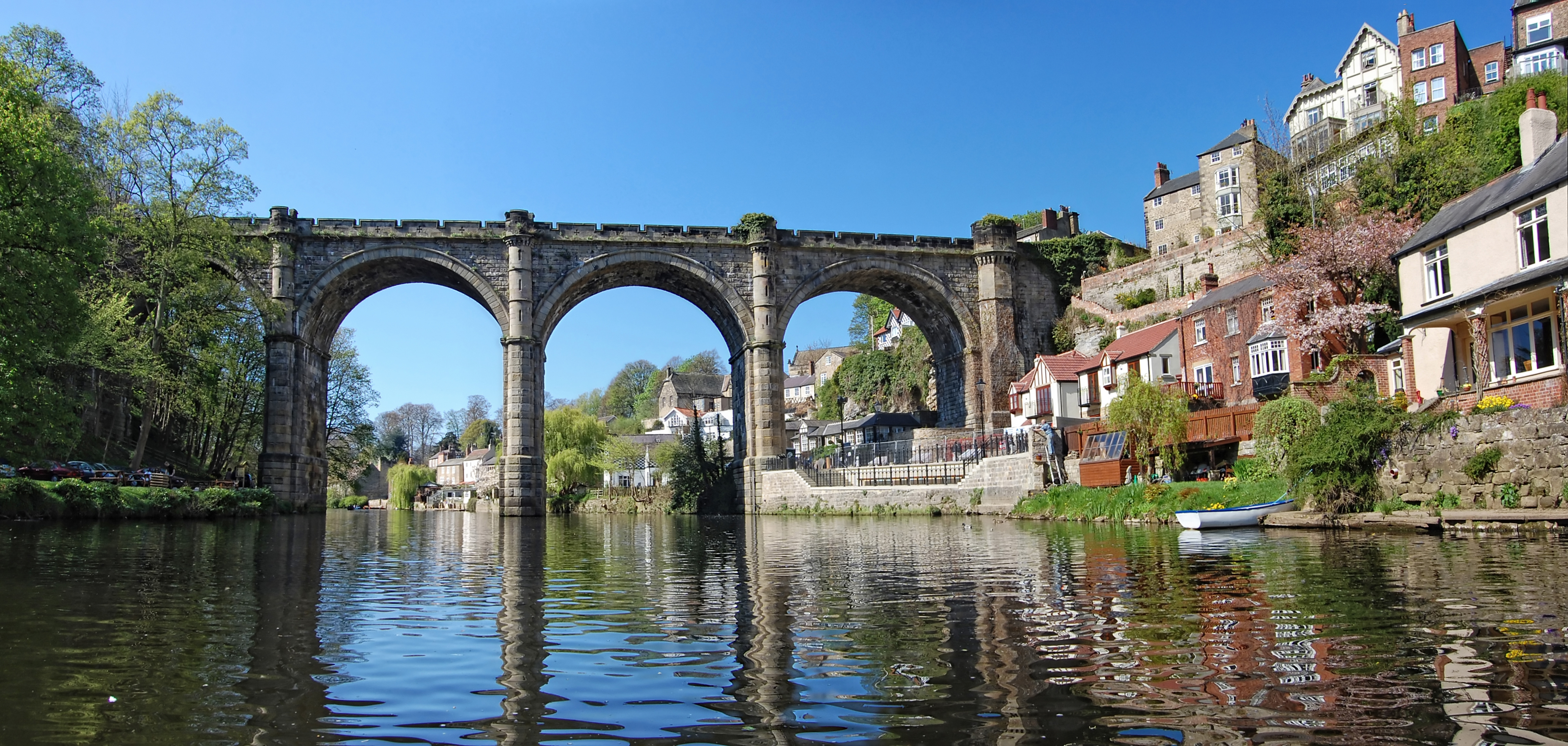
Knaresborough Viaduct

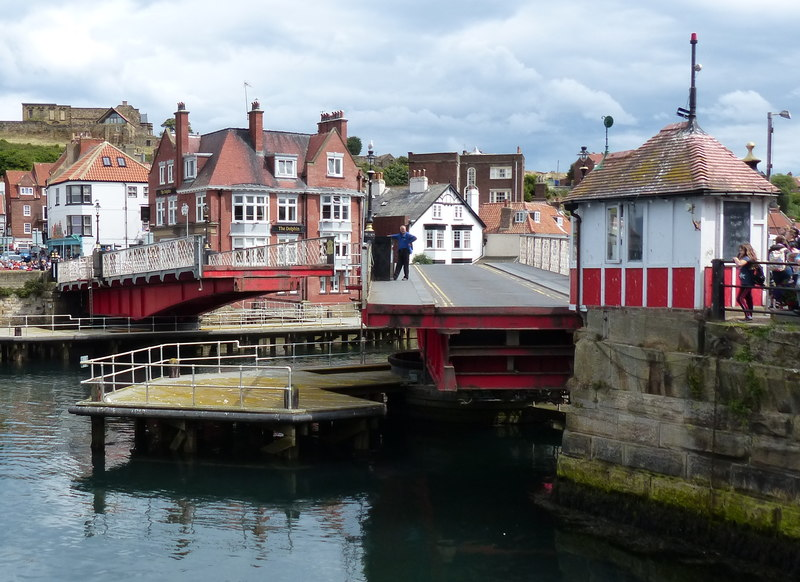
Whitby Swing Bridge

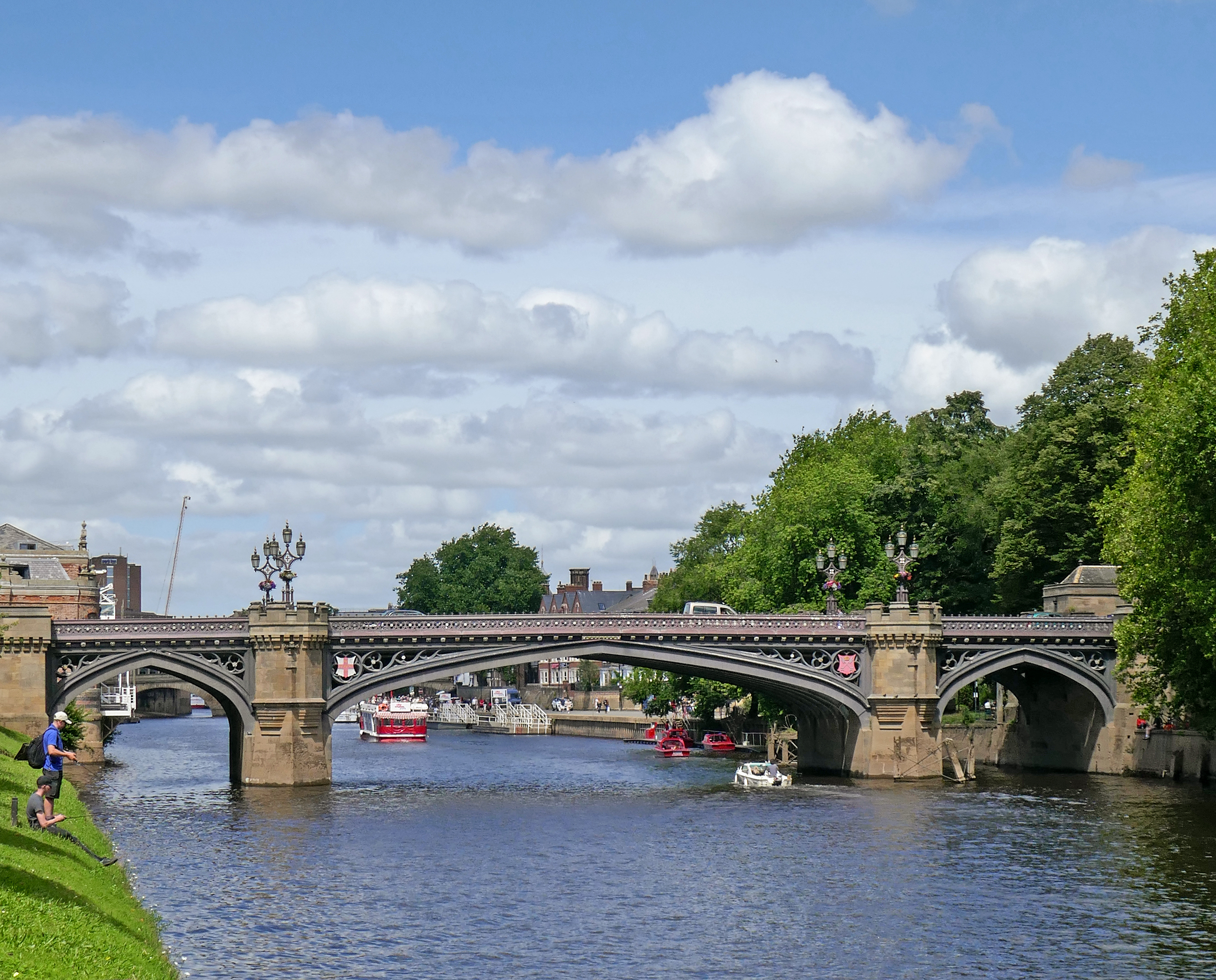
Skeldergate Bridge

North Yorkshire has a number of bridge with clusters such as bridges of York or in the Tees Lowlands, over the River Tees. Many are road bridges, railway viaducts or footbridges; such Lendal Bridge in York, Saltburn Viaduct and the Infinity Bridge respectively.

The Tees Transporter Bridge, opened in 1911 is a symbol of Teesside and is one of few surviving transporter bridges worldwide. Further inland, the Tees Barrage complex (which opened in 1995) incorporates a tidal barrier, road bridge, footbridge and barge lock.

Larpool Viaduct near Whitby is a repurposed railway viaduct (footbridge), the viaduct was affected by the Beeching cuts in 1965 with the rail-line connecting Whitby to Scarborough axed. It was opened in 1885, closed in 1965 then repurposed and re-opened in 2000.

=== Rail ===
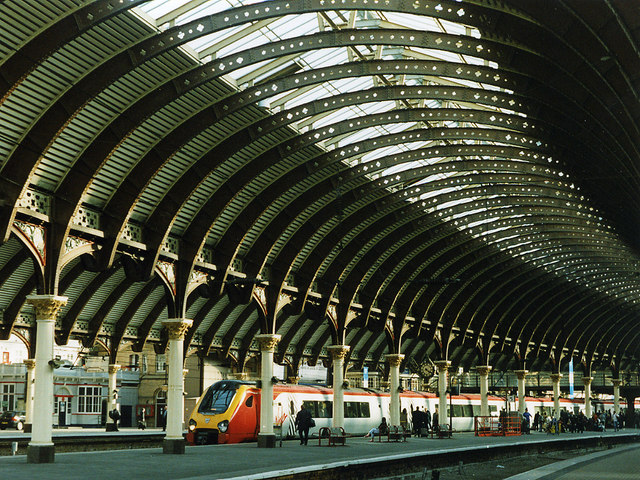
York railway station

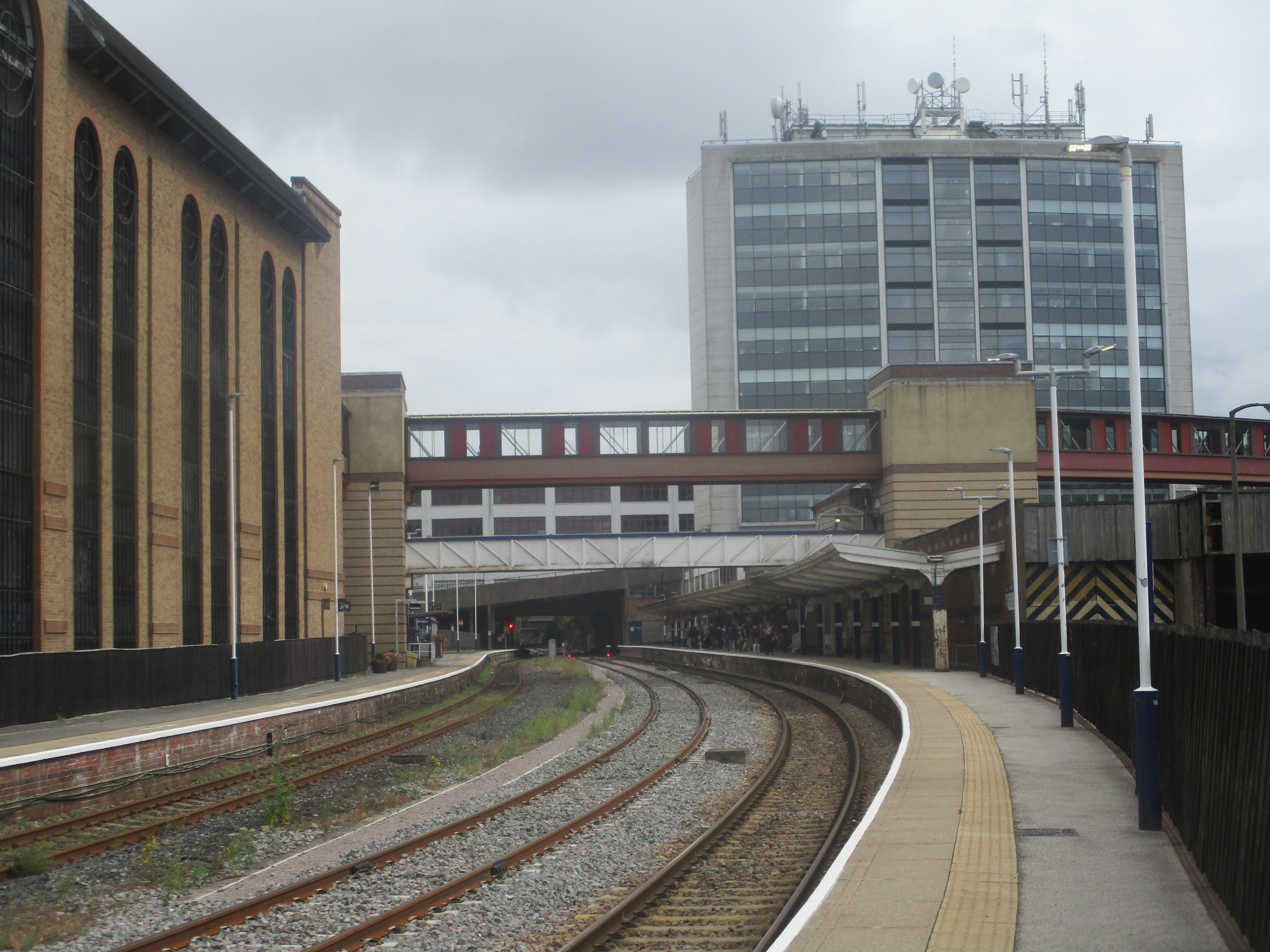
Harrogate railway station

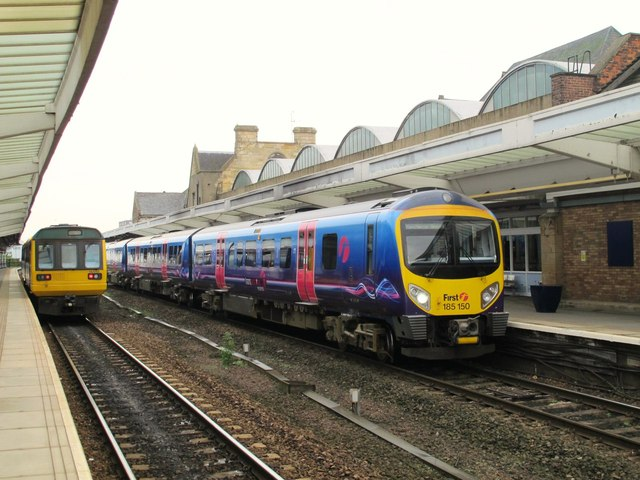
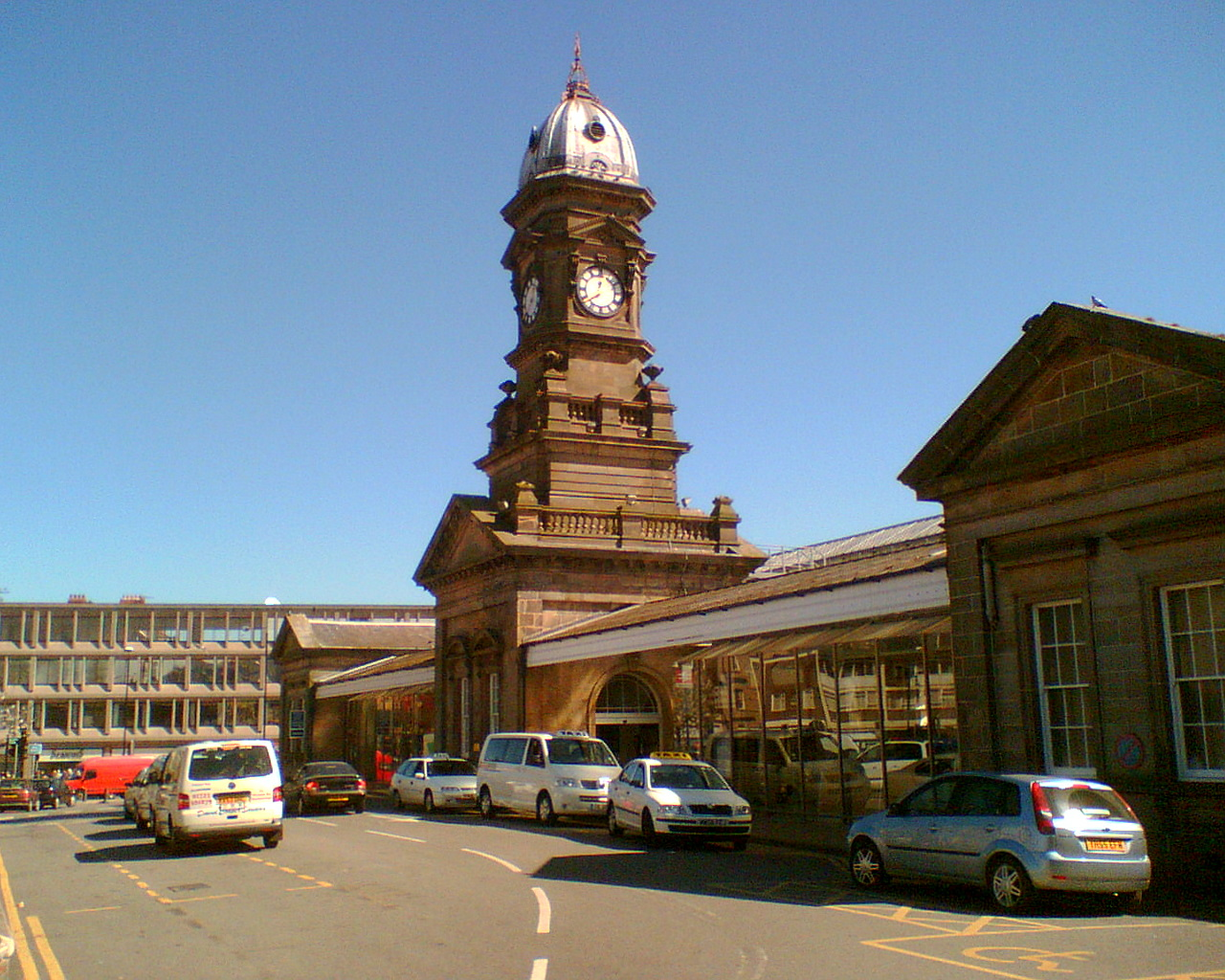
York, Harrogate, Middlesbrough
and Scarborough railway stations

The East Coast Main Line (ECML) bisects the county stopping at Northallerton,Thirsk and York. Passenger service companies in the area are London North Eastern Railway, Northern Rail, TransPennine Express and Grand Central.

LNER and Grand Central operate services to the capital on the ECML, Leeds Branch Line and the Northallerton–Eaglescliffe Line. LNER stop at York, Northallerton and on to County Durham or spur over to the Tees Valley Line for Thornaby and Middlesbrough. The operator also branch before the county for Leeds and run to Harrogate and Skipton. Grand Central stop at York, Thirsk Northallerton and Eaglescliffe then over to the Durham Coast Line in County Durham.

Northern operates the remaining lines in the county, including commuter services on the Harrogate Line, Airedale Line and York & Selby Lines, of which the former two are covered by the Metro ticketing area. Remaining branch lines operated by Northern include the Yorkshire Coast Line from Scarborough to Hull, York–Scarborough line via Malton, the Hull to York Line via Selby, the Tees Valley Line from Darlington to Saltburn via Middlesbrough and the Esk Valley Line from Middlesbrough to Whitby. Last but certainly not least, the Settle-Carlisle Line runs through the west of the county, with services again operated by Northern.

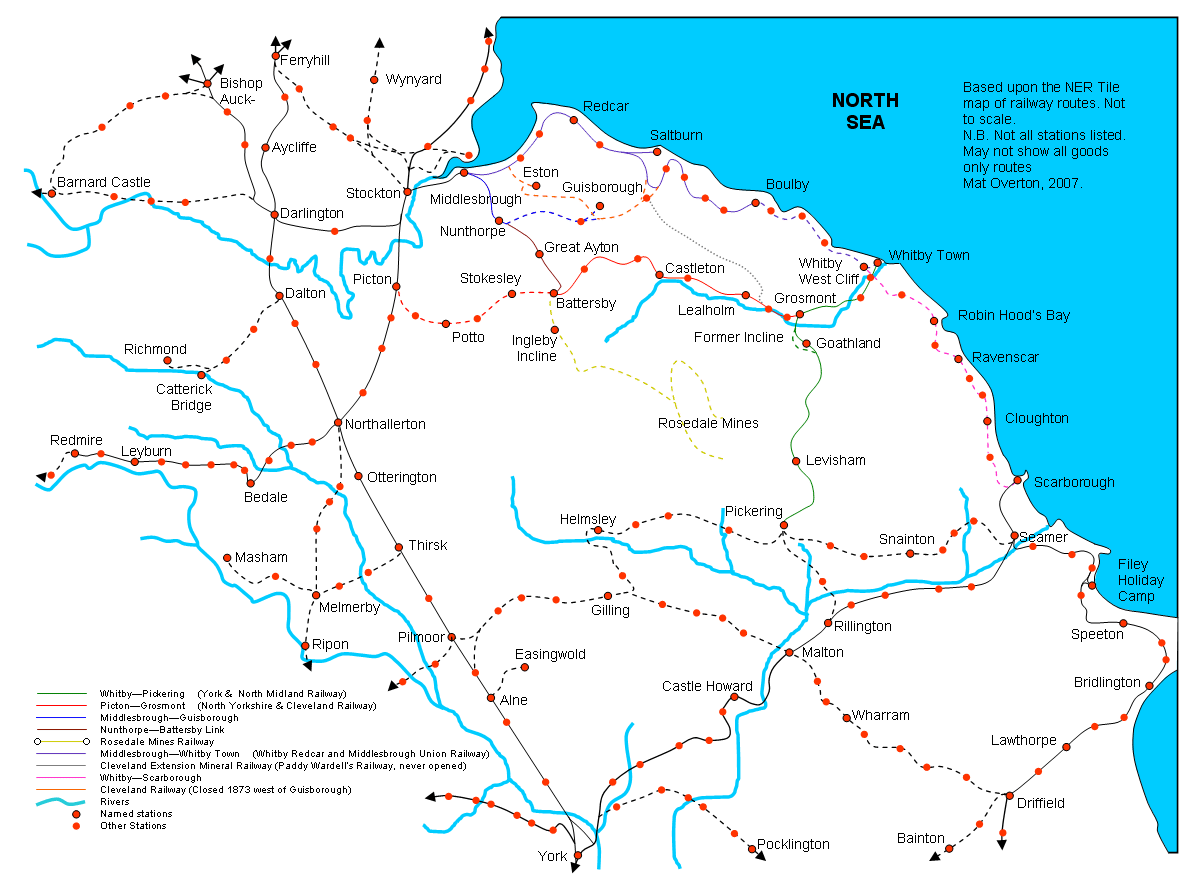
Current and former railway routes in eastern North Yorkshire

The county suffered badly under the Beeching cuts of the 1960s. Places such as Richmond, Ripon, Tadcaster, Helmsley, Pickering and the Wensleydale communities lost their passenger services. Notable lines closed were the Scarborough and Whitby Railway, Malton and Driffield Railway and the secondary main line between Northallerton and Harrogate via Ripon.

Heritage railways within North Yorkshire include: the North Yorkshire Moors Railway, between Pickering and Grosmont, which opened in 1973; the Derwent Valley Light Railway near York; and the Embsay and Bolton Abbey Steam Railway. The Wensleydale Railway, which started operating in 2003, runs services between Leeming Bar and Redmire along a former freight-only line. The medium-term aim is to operate into Northallerton station on the ECML, once an agreement can be reached with Network Rail. In the longer term, the aim is to reinstate the full line west via Hawes to Garsdale on the Settle-Carlisle line.

York railway station is the largest station in the county, with 11 platforms and is a major tourist attraction in its own right. The station is immediately adjacent to the National Railway Museum.

=== Road ===
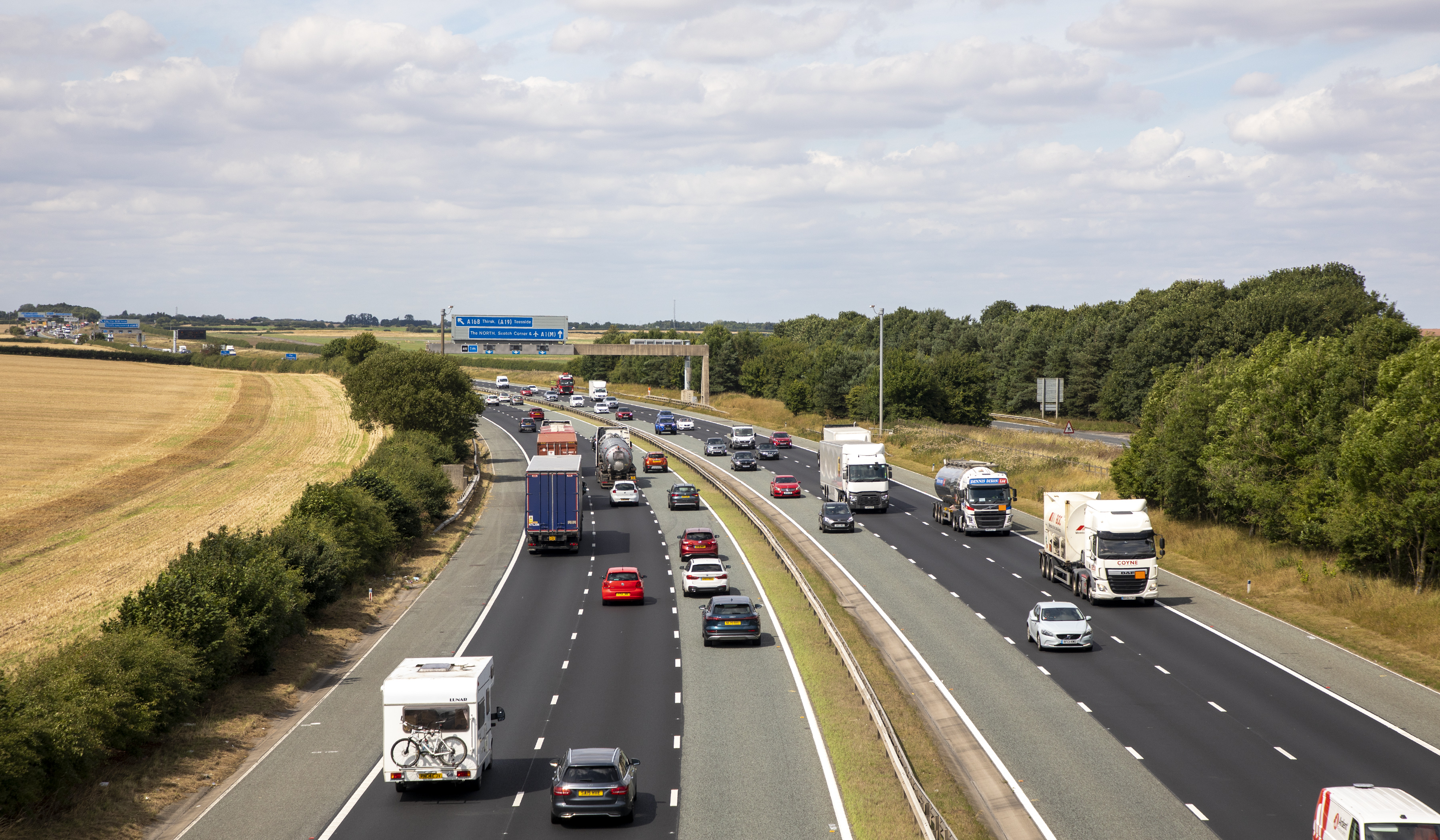
The A1(M) at Dishforth

The main road through the county is the north–south A1(M), which has gradually been upgraded in sections to motorway status since the early 1990s. The only other motorways within the county are the short A66(M) near Darlington and a small stretch of the M62 motorway close to Eggborough. The other nationally maintained trunk routes are the A168/A19, A64, A66 and A174.

Coach and bus

Long-distance coach services are operated by National Express. Local bus service operators include Arriva Yorkshire, Stagecoach Yorkshire, Harrogate Bus Company, Keighley Bus Company, East Yorkshire, Yorkshire Coastliner, First York and the local Dales & District.

=== Air ===
There are no major airports in the county itself, but nearby airports include Teesside International (Darlington), Newcastle and Leeds Bradford.

== Education ==
=== Universities ===
The main campus of Teesside University is in Middlesbrough, while York contains the main campuses of the University of York and York St John University. There are also two secondary campuses in the county: CU Scarborough, a campus of Coventry University, and Queen's Campus, Durham University in Thornaby-on-Tees.

=== Colleges ===
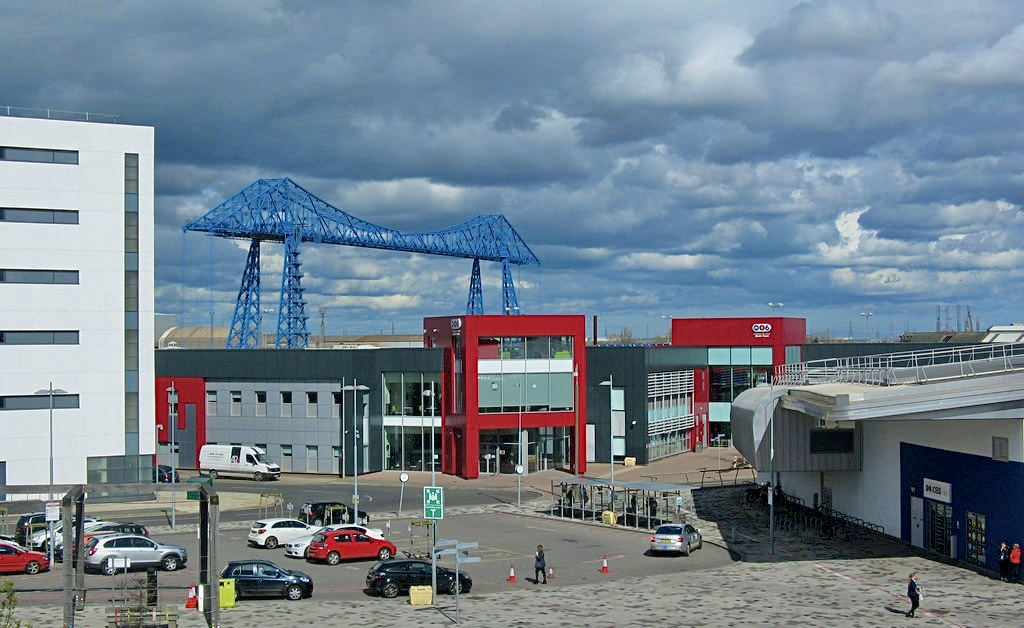
Middlesbrough College's sixth-form

- Askham Bryan College of agriculture, Askham Bryan and Middlesbrough
- Craven College, Skipton
- Middlesbrough College
- The Northern School of Art, Middlesbrough
- Prior Pursglove College
- Redcar & Cleveland College
- Scarborough Sixth Form College
- Scarborough TEC
- Selby College
- Stockton Riverside College, Thornaby
- York College

== Places of interest ==
Key
	Abbey/Priory/Cathedral
Accessible open space	Accessible open space
	Amusement/Theme Park
	Castle
Country Park	Country Park
	English Heritage
	Forestry Commission
Heritage railway	Heritage railway
Historic house	Historic House
Places of Worship	Places of Worship
Museum (free) Museum	Museum (free/not free)
National Trust	National Trust
	Theatre
	Zoo

- Beningbrough Hall –
- Black Sheep Brewery
- Bolton Castle –
- Brimham Rocks –
- Castle Howard and the Howardian Hills –
- Catterick Garrison
- Cleveland Hills
- Drax Power Station
- Duncombe Park – stately home
- Eden Camp Museum –
- Embsay & Bolton Abbey Steam Railway –
- Eston Nab
- Flamingo Land Theme Park and Zoo –
- Helmsley Castle –
- Ingleborough Cave – show cave
- John Smith's Brewery
- Jorvik Viking Centre –
- Lightwater Valley –
- Lund's Tower
- Malham Cove
- Middleham Castle –
- Mother Shipton's Cave –
- National Railway Museum –
- North Yorkshire Moors Railway –
- Ormesby Hall – Palladian Mansion
- Pickering Castle —
- Richmond Castle –
- Ripley Castle – Stately home and historic village
- Riverside Stadium
- Samuel Smith's Brewery
- Shandy Hall – stately home
- Skipton Castle –
- Stanwick Iron Age Fortifications –
- Studley Royal Park –
- Stump Cross Caverns – show cave
- Tees Transporter Bridge
- Theakston Brewery
- Thornborough Henges
- Wainman's Pinnacle
- Wharram Percy
- York Castle Museum –
- Yorkshire Air Museum –
- The Yorkshire Arboretum

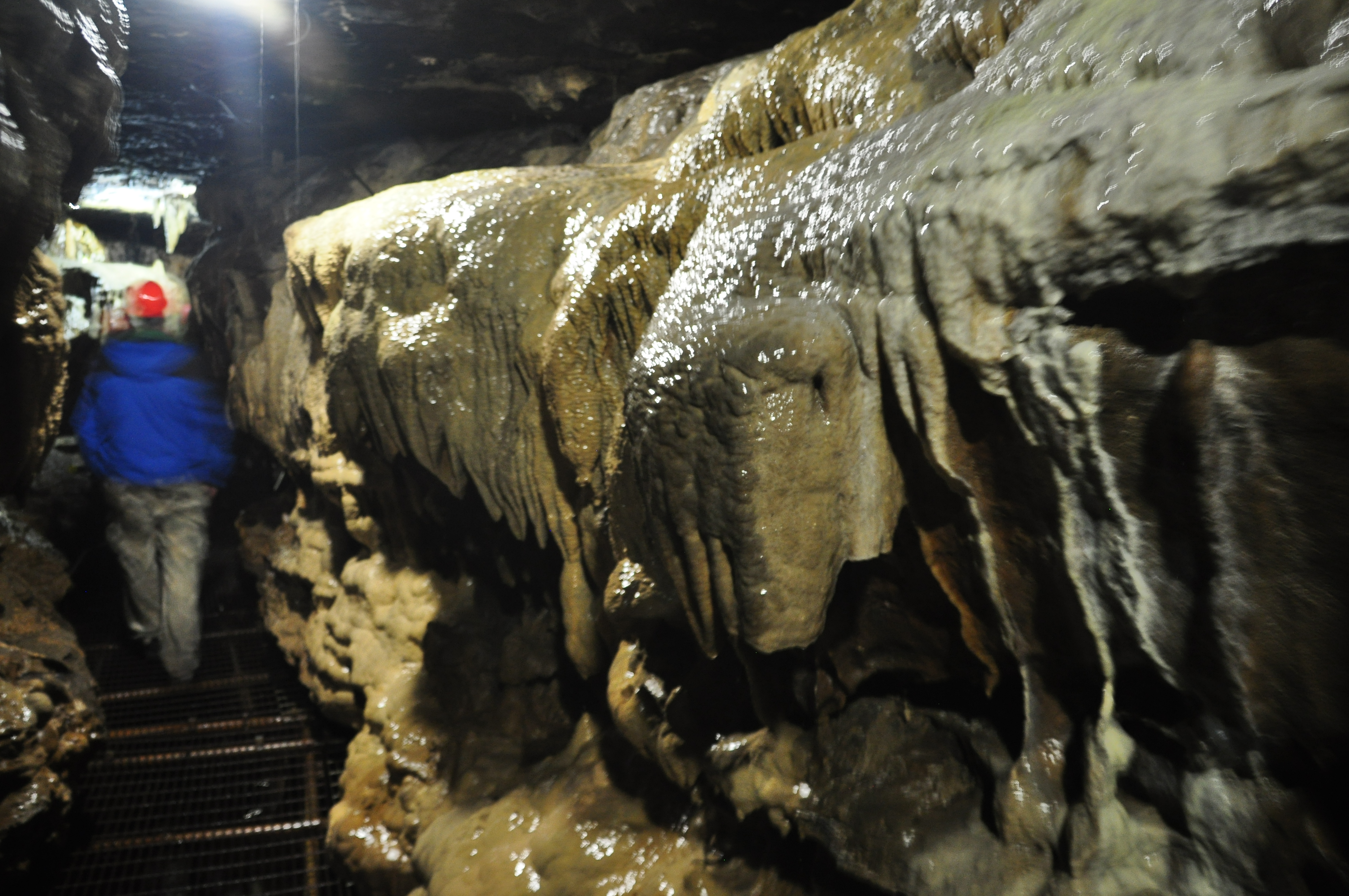
White Scar Cave is a popular show cave in Chapel-le-Dale.

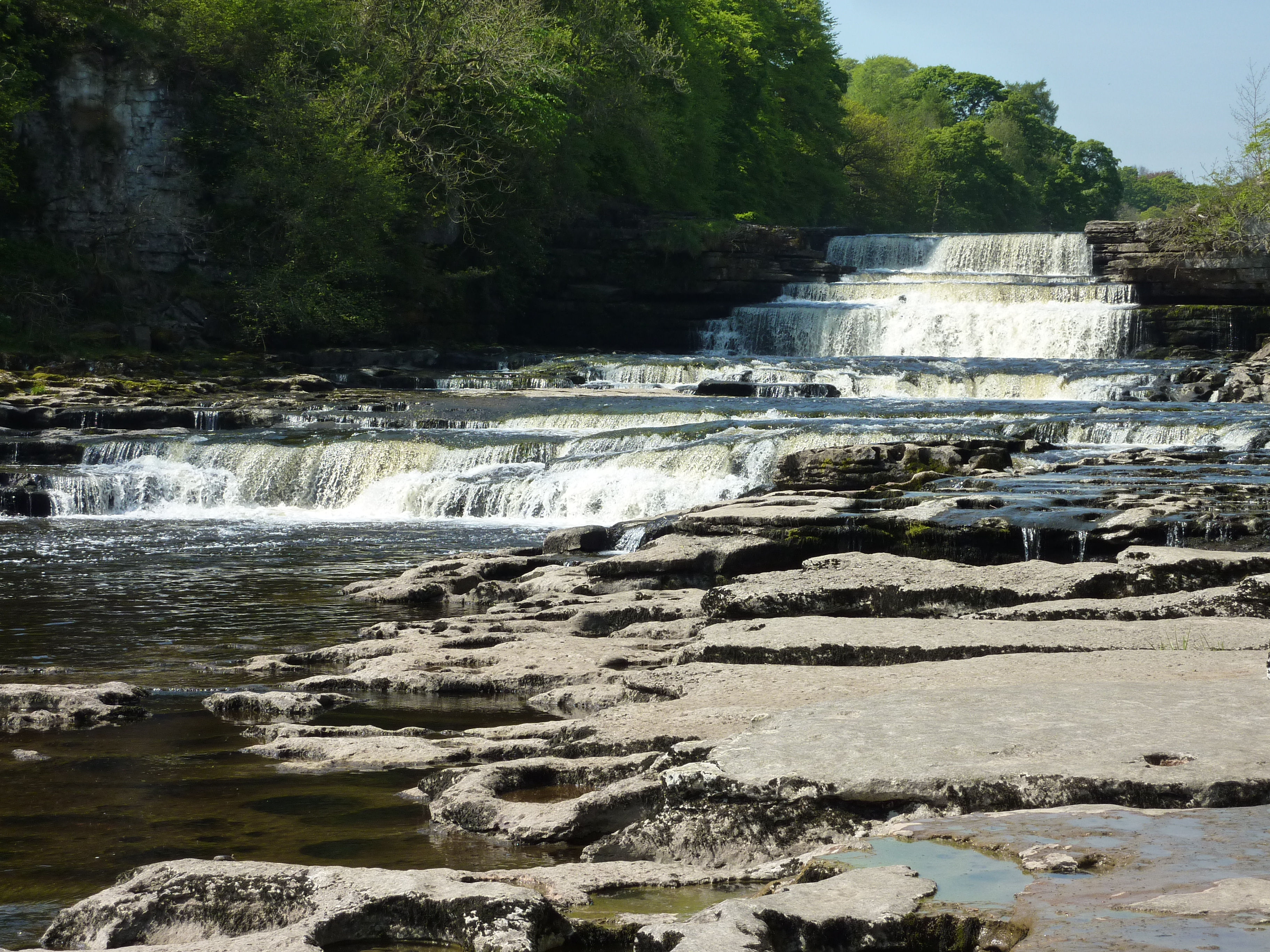
Aysgarth Falls, a popular destination in the Yorkshire Dales National Park for hikers, can also be reached by a short walk from the main road.

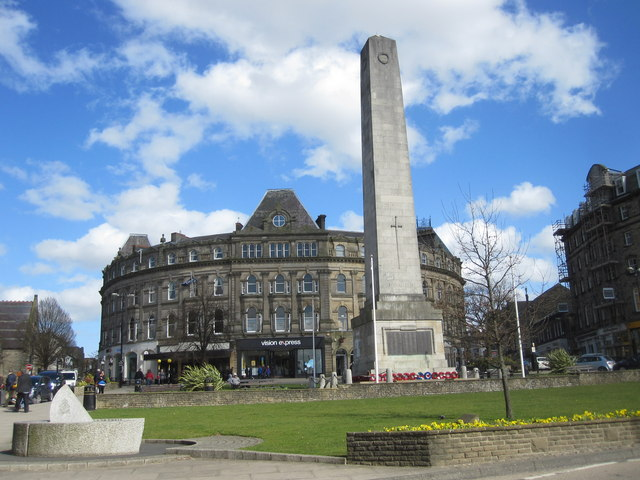
Harrogate is also a popular tourist destination, famous for its Victorian Turkish baths, gastronomy and high-end shops. The picture is of the Cenotaph.

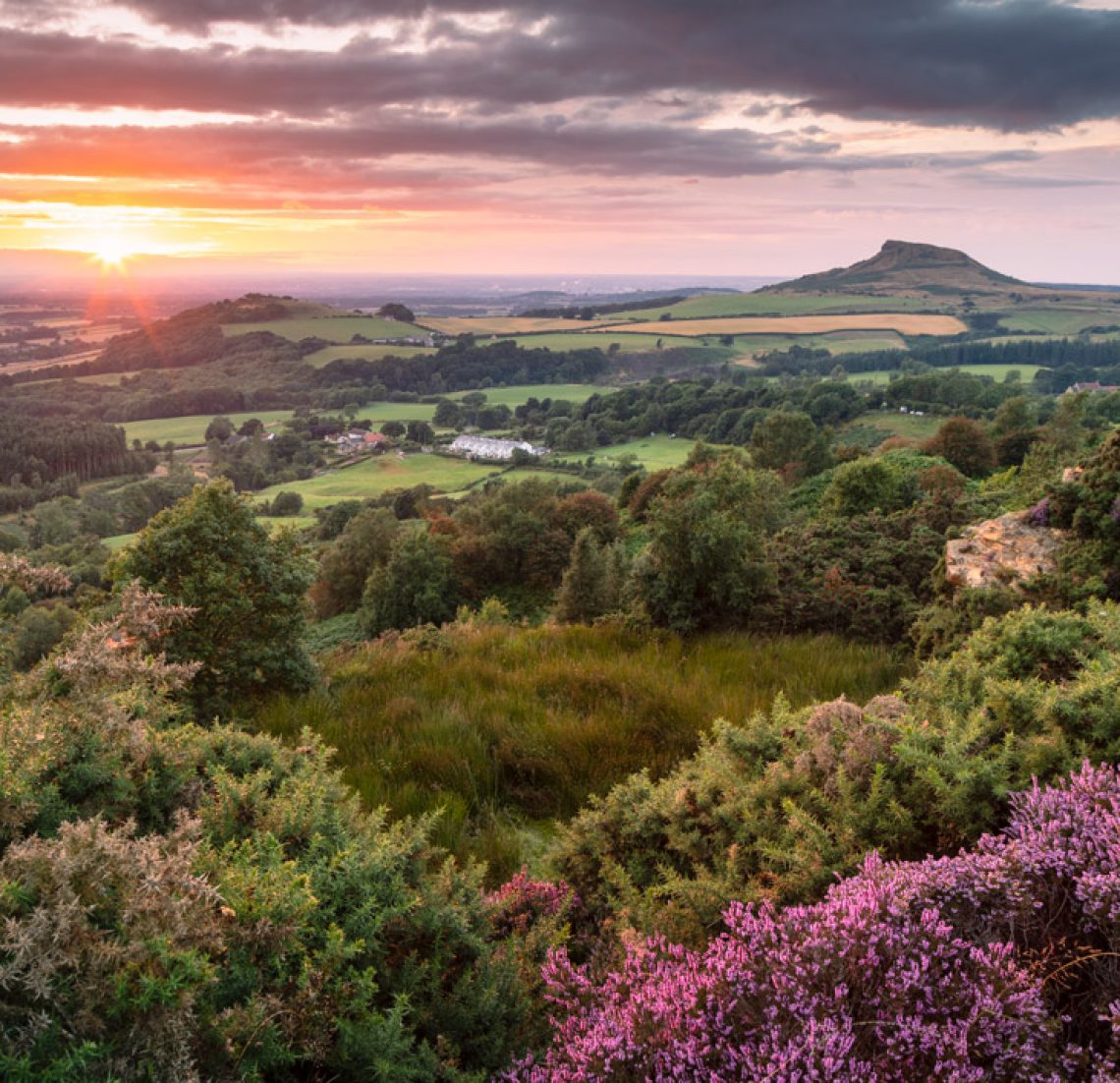
Roseberry Topping in the North York Moors

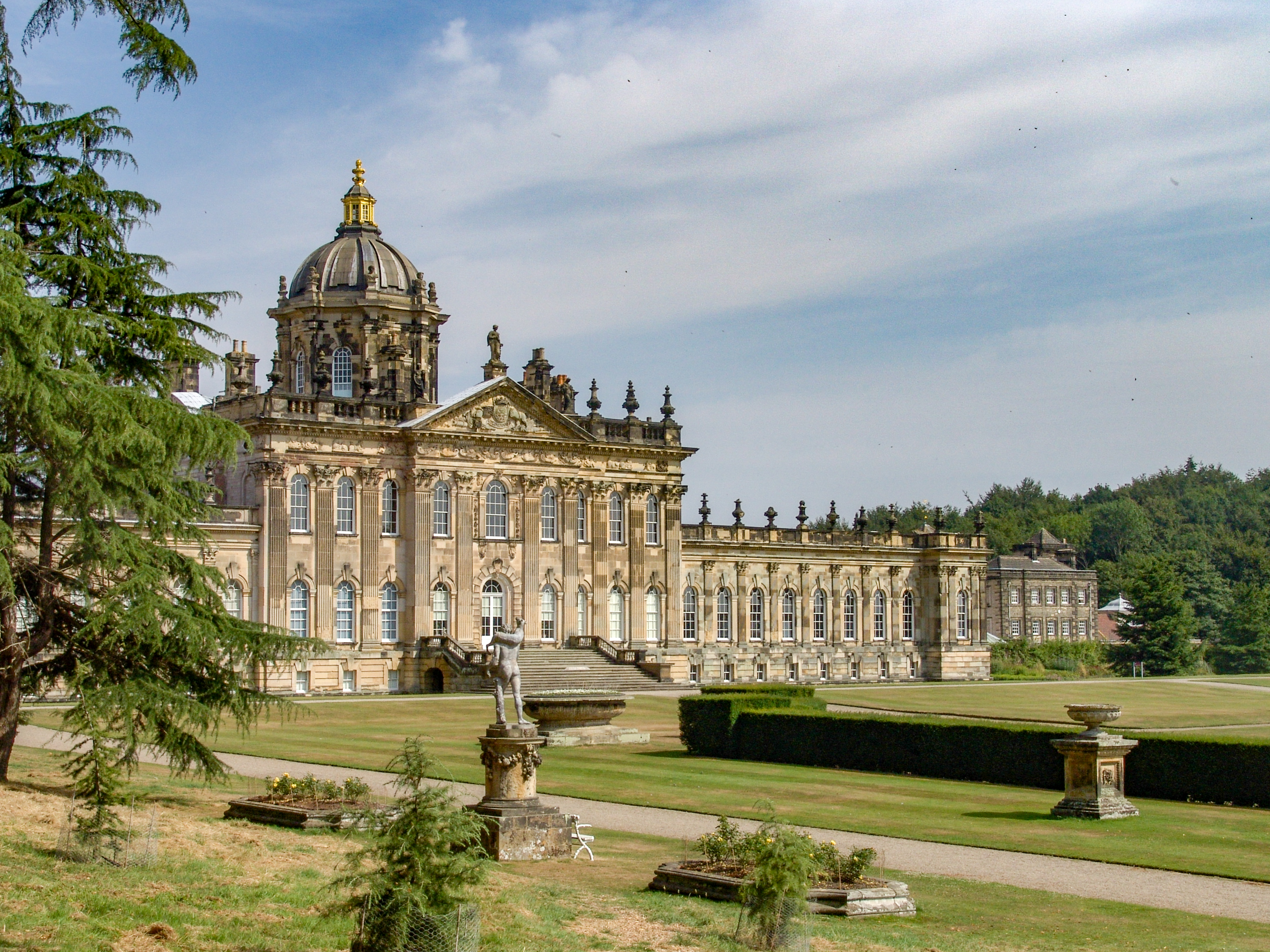
Castle Howard

=== Religious sites ===
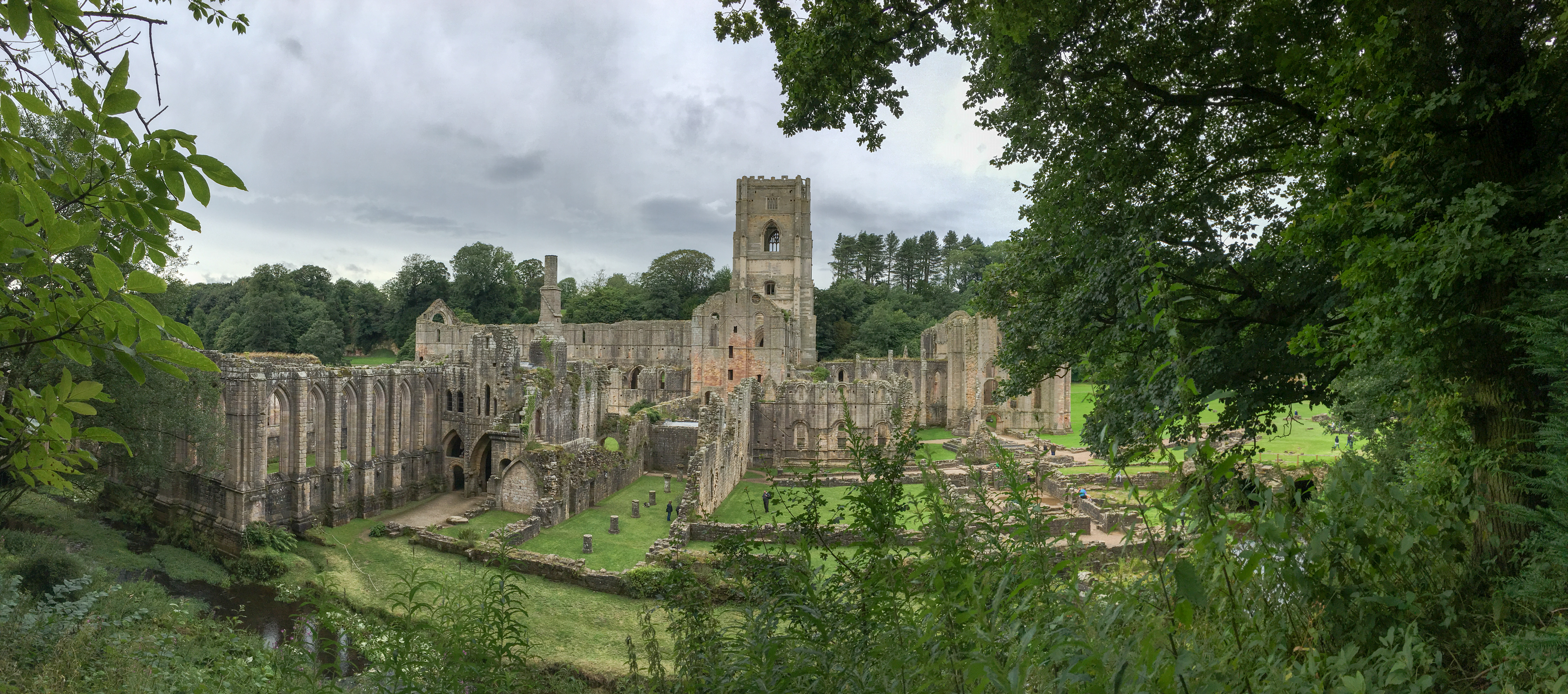
Fountains Abbey

- Ampleforth Abbey
- Bolton Abbey
- Byland Abbey –
- Fountains Abbey –
- Gisborough Priory
- Kirkham Priory
- Mount Grace Priory –
- Pickering Parish Church — home of The Pickering Wall Paintings
- Rievaulx Abbey –
- Ripon Cathedral –
- Selby Abbey
- Wharram Percy
- Whitby Abbey –
- York Minster –

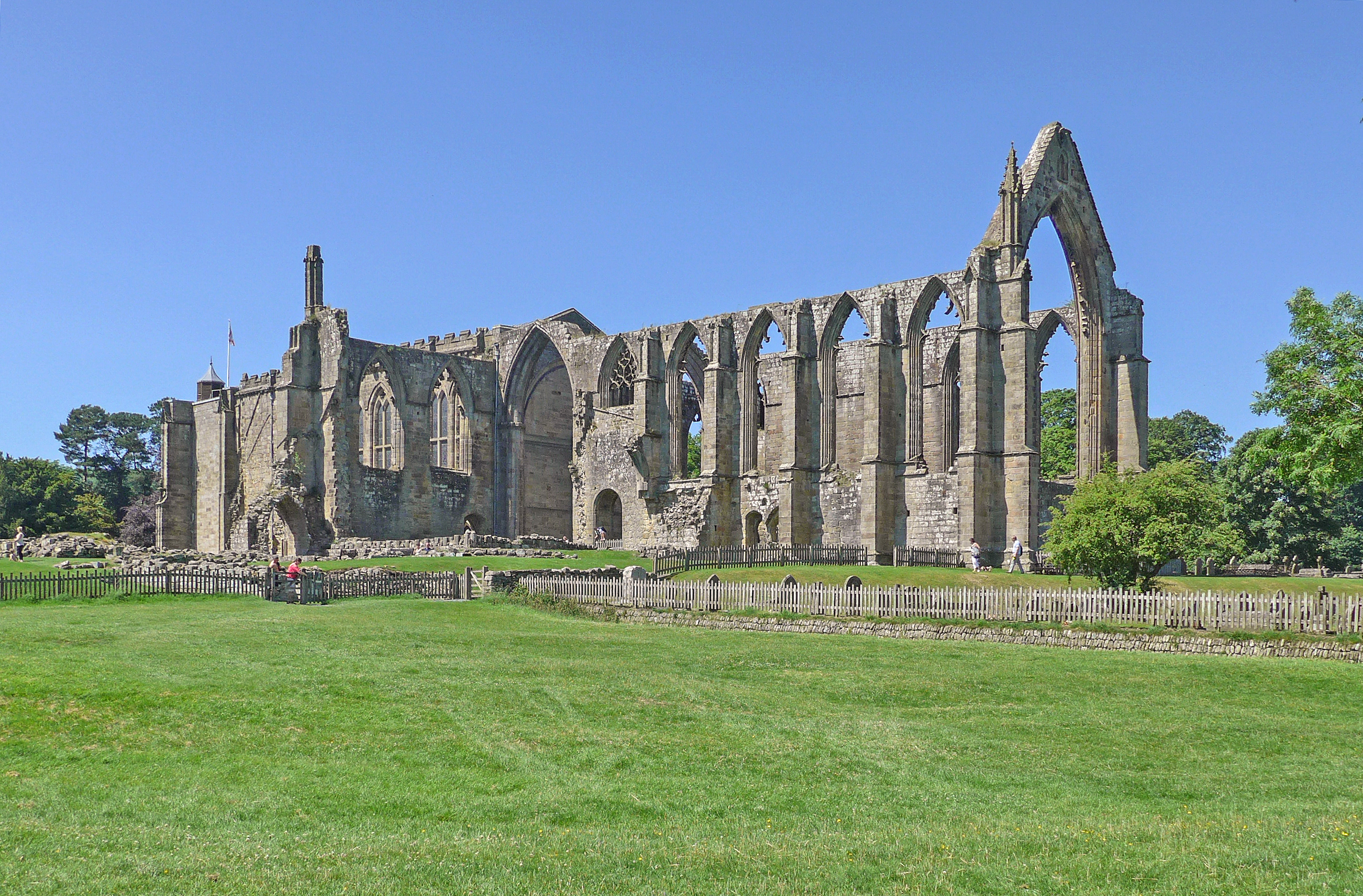
Bolton Abbey

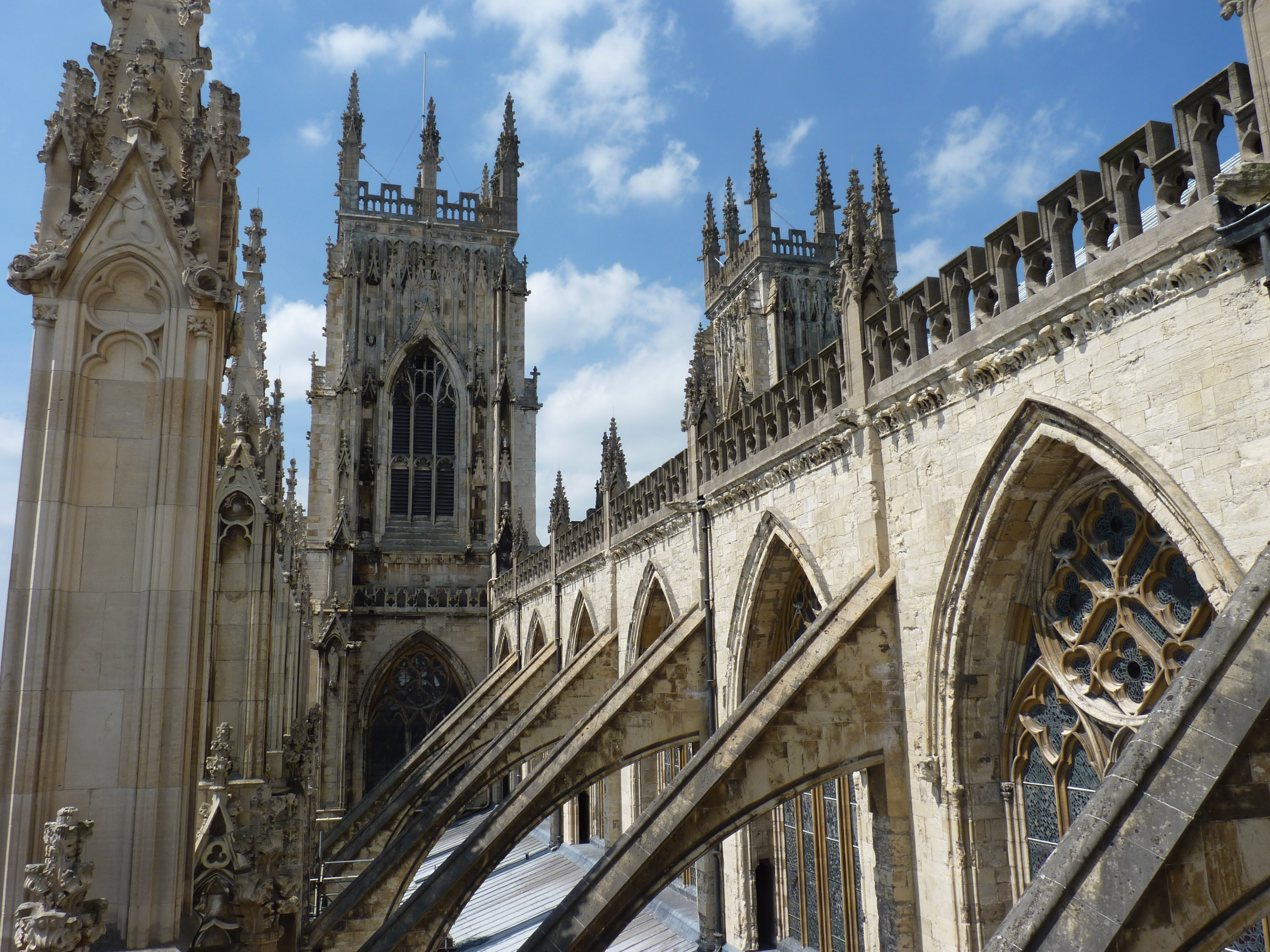
In terms of interior floor area, York Minster is the 3rd largest cathedral in the United Kingdom.

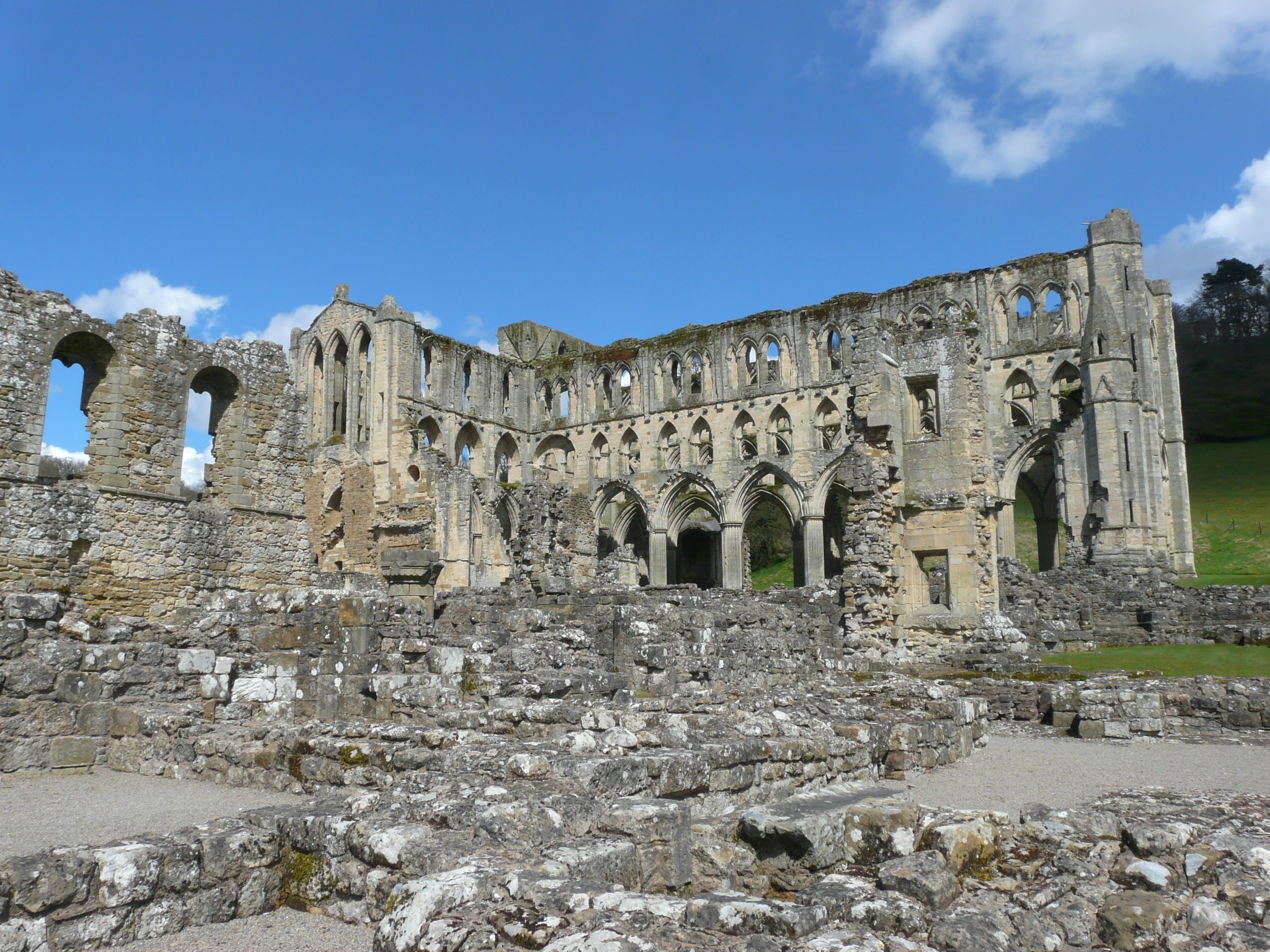
Rievaulx Abbey

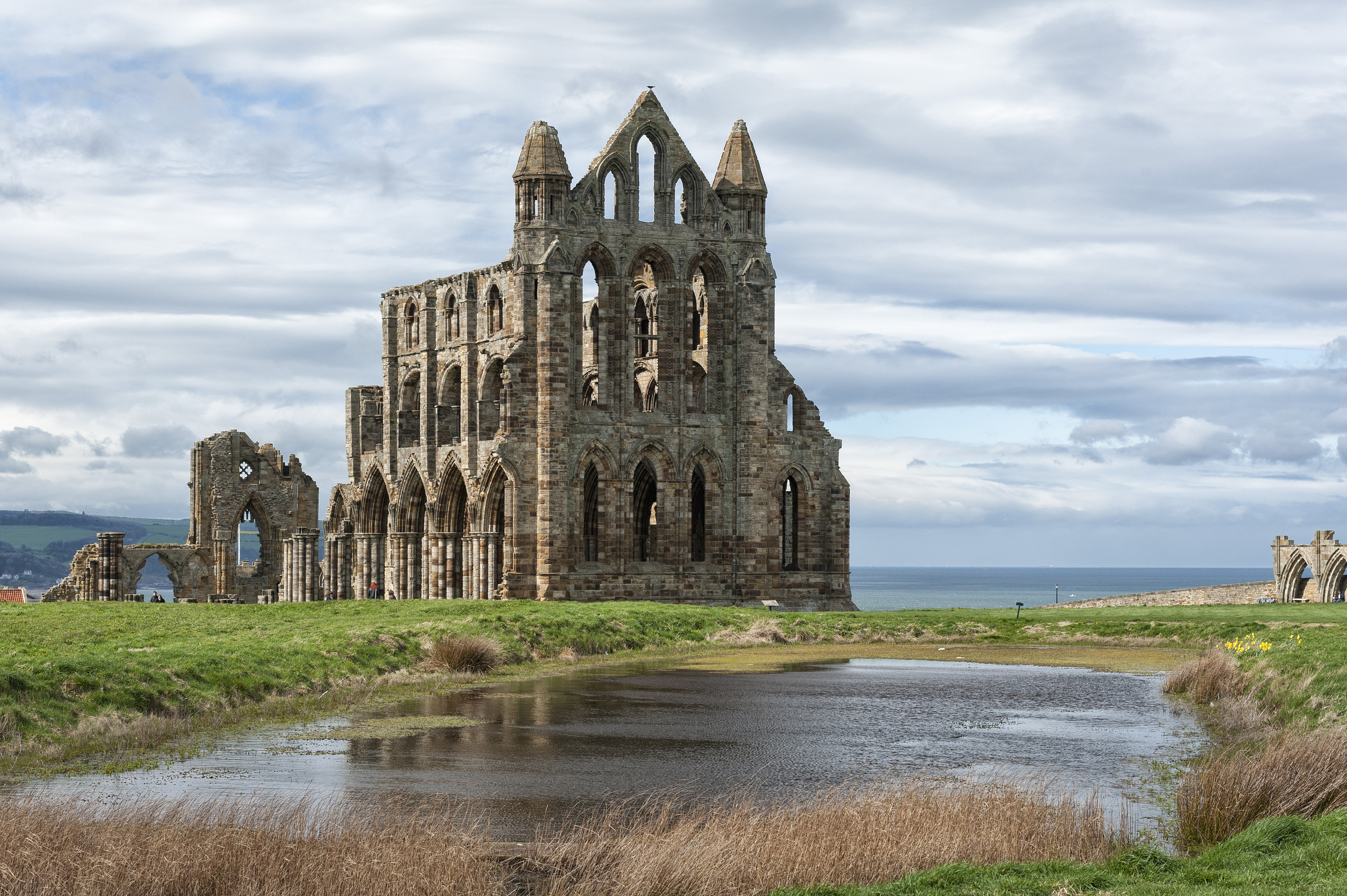
With the first monastery built in the 7th century, the ruins of the medieval Whitby Abbey still stand today, now famous for its role in Dracula.

=== Seaside ===
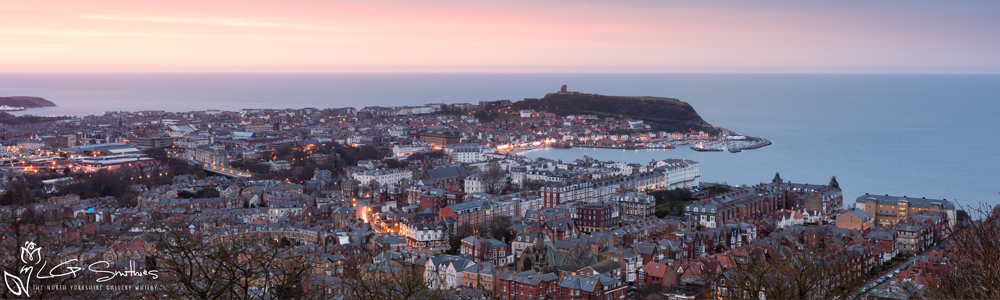
Scarborough from Oliver's Mount

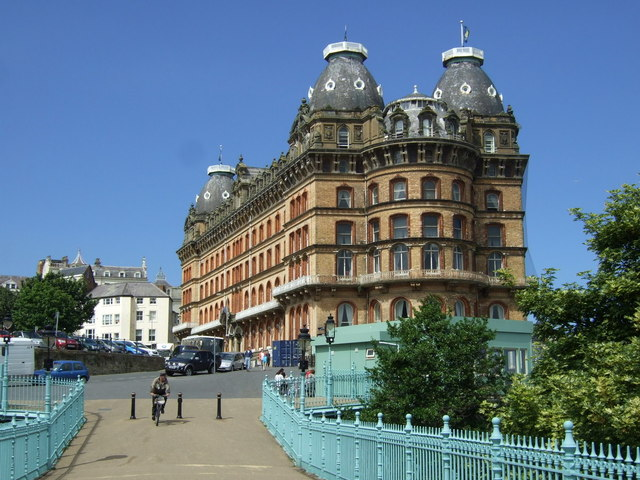
The Grand Hotel in Scarborough is a Grade II* listed building. At the time of its grand opening in 1867, it was the largest hotel and the largest brick structure in Europe.

- Filey
- Redcar
- Robin Hood's Bay
- Scarborough
  - Castle –
  - Peasholm Park
  - Funiculars
  - Scarborough Spa
- Saltburn
  - Cliff Lift
  - Pier
  - Miniature Railway
- Staithes
- Whitby
  - Captain Cook Memorial Museum
  - Cholmley House
  - 199 Steps
  - Pavilion
  - Piers

== News and media ==
The county receives terrestrial television from four main transmission towers. Bilsdale Mast transmits in the county's north from near Helmsley in the county; providing BBC North East and Cumbria, ITV Tyne Tees and BBC Radio Tees.

Emley Moor Mast transmits in the county's south, between Selby and Northallerton, from West Yorkshire and Oliver's Mount Mast transmits Scarborough and Filey providing BBC Yorkshire, ITV Yorkshire and BBC Radio York.

Settle and the county's far west is served by BBC Radio Lancashire, BBC North West and ITV Granada from Winter Hill Mast, Lancashire.

== Sport ==
=== Cricket ===
Yorkshire County Cricket Club play a number of fixtures at North Marine Road, Scarborough and some 2nd XI games in Richmond. The ball game Rock-It-Ball was developed in the county.

=== Association football ===
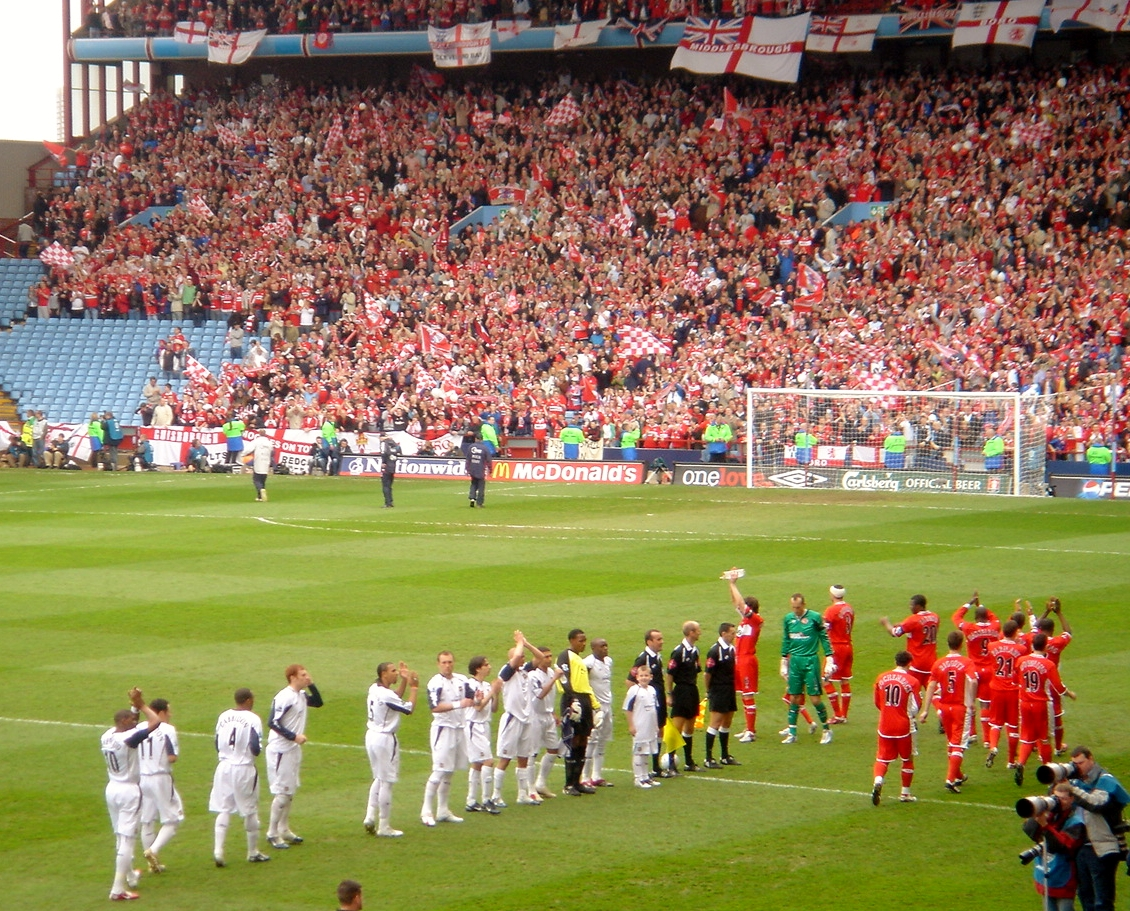
Middlesbrough vs West Ham in FA Cup semi-final 2006

North Yorkshire has a number of association football clubs, including:

- Guisborough Town
- Harrogate Railway Athletic
- Harrogate Town
- Middlesbrough
- Marske United
- Northallerton Town
- Pickering Town
- Redcar Athletic
- Scarborough Athletic
- Selby Town
- Tadcaster Albion
- Thornaby
- Whitby Town
- York City

Middlesbrough are currently the highest-ranked team in the county as they play in the EFL Championship. In the past, they have won the EFL Cup and reached the UEFA Cup final. Harrogate Town play in the EFL League Two. York City play in the EFL League Two. Scarborough Athletic, a phoenix club of Scarborough, play in the National League North. Whitby Town have reached the FA Cup first round seven times and have played the likes of Hull City, Wigan Athletic and Plymouth Argyle; they currently play in the Northern Premier League Premier Division.

=== Rugby football ===
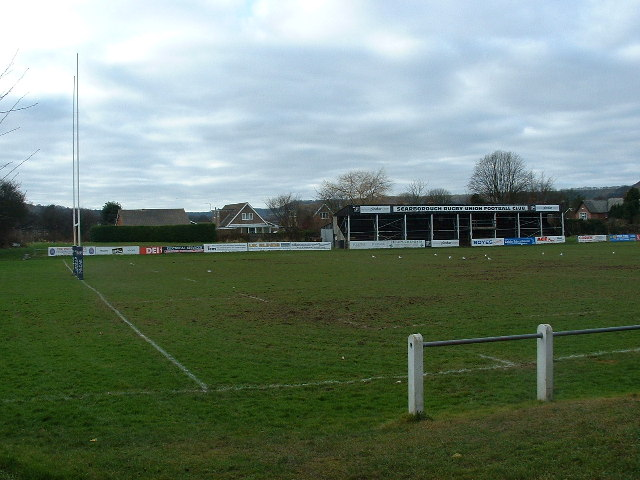
Scarborough ground

Rugby Union Teams 2022–23
League	Team	Venue	Capacity	Location
National League 2 North	Harrogate	Rudding Lane		Harrogate
National League 2 North	Wharfedale	The Avenue	2,000	Threshfield
Regional 1 North East	York	Clifton Park	3,500	York, North Yorkshire
Regional 2 North East	Malton & Norton	The Gannock		Malton
Regional 2 North East	Scarborough	Silver Royd	4,500 (425 seats)	Scalby, Scarborough
Regional 2 North East	Selby	Sandhill Lane		Selby
Regional 2 North	Middlesbrough	Acklam Park	5,000 (159 seats)	Acklam, Middlesbrough

The leading rugby union teams in the county include Wharfedale RUFC, Harrogate RUFC, but teams also include Middlesbrough RUFC and Acklam RUFC who play their league games in Regional 2 North, a corresponding league of the same level hosting teams from Teesside, County Durham and Northumberland. The rugby league club, York RLFC, are represented by York Knights who play in the Rugby League Championships and York Valkyrie in the RFL Women's Super League.

=== Racing ===
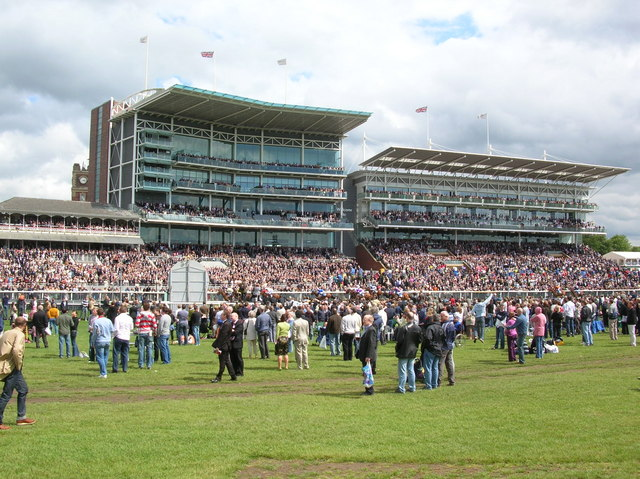
York Racecourse

North Yorkshire has multiple racecourses, at: Catterick Bridge, Redcar, Ripon, Thirsk and York. It also has one motor racing circuit, Croft Circuit; the circuit holds meetings of the British Touring Car Championship, British Superbike and Pickup Truck Racing race series and one Motorcycle Racing Circuit at Oliver's Mount, Scarborough.

== See also ==
- List of Lords Lieutenant of North Yorkshire
- List of High Sheriffs of North Yorkshire
- List of settlements in North Yorkshire by population
- Listed buildings in North Yorkshire
- Demographics of Tees Valley
