= High Sheriff of North Yorkshire =

Ceremonial officer of the English county of North Yorkshire

The High Sheriff of North Yorkshire is a current High Sheriff title which has existed since 1974. For around 1,000 years the entire area of Yorkshire was covered by a single High Sheriff of Yorkshire. After the Local Government Act 1972 the title was split to cover several newly created counties, including North Yorkshire.

Below is a list of the sheriffs.

== List of High Sheriffs ==
- 1974–75 Montague Charles Warcop Peter Consett
- 1975–76 David Rimington Tetley
- 1976–77 Nigel Colin Forbes Adam
- 1977–78 Frank Wilson Furness
- 1978–79 Robert Edward John Compton of Newby Hall
- 1979–80 Lord Martin Fitzalan Howard
- 1980–81 Peter Noel Leetham Terry
- 1981–82 Francis Edward Hudson
- 1982–83 Sir Marcus Worsley, 5th Baronet of Hovingham Hall
- 1983–84 Peter Bell
- 1984–85 Anthony Thomas Preston
- 1985–86 Michael Thomas Barstow
- 1986–87 Marmaduke Charles Astey Wyvill
- 1987–88 John Harold Vick Sutcliffe
- 1988–89 Edward Christopher York
- 1989–90 Richard Nicholas Crossley
- 1990–91 Valerie Anne Worthington
- 1991–92 Sir John Bruce Woollacott Ropner, 2nd Baronet
- 1992–93 Sir Richard Storey, 2nd Baronet
- 1993–94 Michael David Abrahams
- 1994–95 Richard Edward Howard-Vyse
- 1995–96 The Hon. Simon Bartholomew Geoffrey Howard
- 1996–97 John Leslie Charles Pratt
- 1997–98 Anthony Guy Swaine Chisenhale-Marsh
- 1998–99 Lady Clarissa Collin
- 1999–2000 Andrew Vavasour Hudson
- 2000–01 Gerald Christopher Turton
- 2001–02 David Nelson
- 2002–03 Mark Singleton Evans
- 2003–04 Air Commodore Simon Bostock
- 2004–05 Caroline Gardner (Thornton-Berry)
- 2005–06 Elise Mackinlay
- 2006–07 Viscountess Downe
- 2007–08 Philip William Ingham
- 2008–09 Christopher W. Robson of Richmond
- 2009–10 Francesca Ann Horsfield of Brandsby
- 2010–11 Richard Clephane Compton of Ripon
- 2011–12 Alexandra Holford of York
- 2012–13 Major Peter Geoffrey Scrope of Great Ayton.
- 2013–14 Reverend Rachel Candia Benson of Westow.
- 2014–15 Thomas James Ponsonby Ramsden of Old Sleningford Hall, North Stainley, Ripon.
- 2015–16 Charles David Forbes Adam of Skipwith Hall, Selby, York.
- 2016–17 John Wilson Furness of Kirby Knowle, Thirsk.
- 2017–18 Simon Murrough Wrightson of Darlington.
- 2018–19 Christopher John Charles Legard of Scampston Hall, Malton.
- 2019–20 Linda Lee Fenwick of Terrington, York.
- 2020–21 David Arnold Kerfoot of Ainderby Steeple.
- 2021–22 Venetia Anne Wrigley of Ganton, Scarborough.
- 2022–23 James Scott Lambert, of Tunstall, Richmond.
- 2023–24: Clare Deborah Granger of High Birstwith, Harrogate
- 2024-25: Dr. Ruth Madeleine Smith, Harrogate
- 2025-26: Sir Andrew Peter Lawson-Tancred, 11th Baronet, Boroughbridge
- 2026–27: Nigel Frederick Hartley Corner, Leyburn
