= National Media Council =

National Media Council may refer to:

- National Media Council (Poland), a government organisation in Poland.
- National Media Council (United Arab Emirates), a former government organisation in the United Arab Emirates.
