= Nuclear Measurements Corporation =

Maker of radiation measuring and monitoring devices

- Company type: Privately held corporation
- Industry: Nuclear engineering
- Founded: 1950s
- Headquarters: Indianapolis, Indiana, United States

Nuclear Measurements Corporation (NMC) is a privately held company based in Indianapolis, Indiana. It is a maker of instrumentation for the nuclear industry.

== History ==
NMC was founded in the early 1950s. Their analog products included Geiger counters, gamma and neutron detectors, survey meters, and soil analyzers. Some are now considered museum pieces.

After going digital in the early 1980s, its flagship product became the PIOPS ("Programmable Input Output System"), a portable cart unit with embedded systems used to measure air samples for radioactive gases and particulate matter.

== See also ==
- Nuclear engineering
- Radiation
- Environmental science
