= European Magazine Media Association =

Non-profit media organization representing European magazine publishers

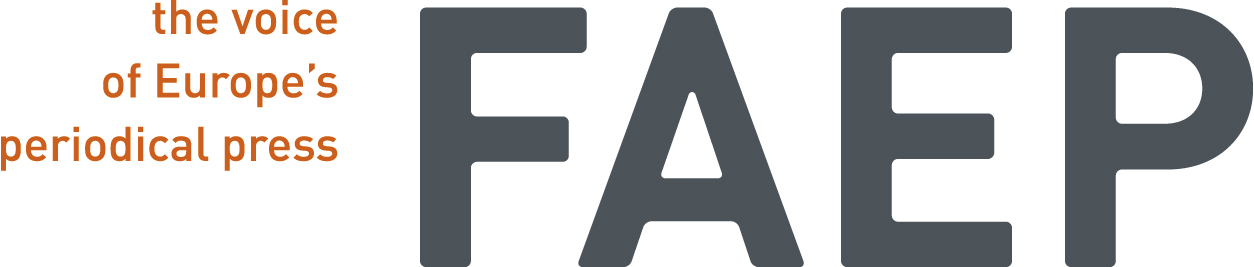
- Industry: Magazine
- Headquarters: Brussels, Belgium
- Key people: Mike Koedinger, president José Guimarães, executive director
- Website: www.magazinemedia.eu

The European Magazine Media Association (formerly the European Federation of Magazine Publishers, FAEP) is a non-profit organization based in Brussels, Belgium that represents 15,000 publishers throughout Europe (mostly small- and medium-sized enterprises) publishing over 50,000 magazine titles in Europe.

== Overview ==
EMMA's mission is to protect and promote the interests of European magazine publishers vis-à-vis the Institutions of the European Union: the European Commission, the European Parliament and the European Council. The main aim of EMMA is to ensure a long-term survival and prosperity of a plural, diverse and economically successful magazine publishing industry in the EU.

EMMA defends freedom of expression, promotes pluralism and diversity, and ensures that Europe's periodical press industry remains competitive and vibrant. It supports self-regulatory mechanisms, backed up by an equitable and balanced legal framework. EMMA points out that the freedom of commercial communication is an integral part of the overall principle of freedom of expression. Commercial communications are the life-blood of the majority of periodical publications.

As of 2017, EMMA's membership is composed of 21 national associations of magazine publishers and 16 corporate publishing companies in Europe. Altogether EMMA represents over 15,000 publishers (mostly small- and medium-sized enterprises) publishing over 50,000 magazine titles throughout Europe.

== Mission statement ==
EMMA's mission is "to promote and protect the interests of publishers of the periodical press within the European Union thus ensuring the long-term survival and prosperity of a plural, diverse and economically successful magazine publishing industry in the EU".

== History ==
The European representation of magazine publishers was founded in 1988 in Brussels under the French name "Federation des associations d'editeurs de periodiques de la C.E.E." (Federation of Associations of Periodical Publishers in the European Economic Community), which originally was abbreviated to FAEP. The goal of the association was, in close collaboration with its members and the authorities of the EEC, to study the regulations governing the activity of periodical publishers, mediate the relations between publishers, the EEC and member states, and to work to maintain the freedom to disseminate information, ideas and knowledge.

The name changed to European Federation of Magazine Publishers around 1993, when the EEC became the EU.

In October 2011, FAEP transitioned to EMMA, the European Magazine Media Association. However, despite the change in name and aesthetics, the main goals set down in 1988 remain. Today, EMMA defends freedom of expression, thus promoting pluralism and diversity, and ensures that Europe's periodical press industry remains competitive and vibrant. Moreover, EMMA supports self-regulatory mechanisms, backed by an equitable and balanced legal framework. EMMA also consistently points out that the freedom of commercial communication is an integral part of the overall principle of freedom of expression, since commercial communications are the life-blood of the majority of periodical publications.

== President ==
Mike Koedinger has been President of EMMA since July 2023. He has been a member of the Press Council of Luxembourg since 2016. Koedinger is the founder, owner, and chief executive of Maison Moderne, the leading independent media company in Luxembourg, which publishes the business magazines Paperjam and Delano.

== Secretariat ==
=== Executive Director ===
José Guimarães serves as Executive Director of the European Magazine Media, having been confirmed in the role in May 2026 after serving as Acting Executive Director since July 2025. He joined EMMA in January 2023 and has over eight years of experience in EU affairs, including at the European Union Intellectual Property Office (EUIPO). His areas of expertise include copyright, online content regulation, media, artificial intelligence, and data protection. He holds a Master's degree in International Relations from the University of Minho (Portugal).

=== Head of Legal and Policy ===
Ariane Carré joined EMMA in January 2020 as Head of Legal and Policy. Prior to joining the publishing sector, she worked for the European organisation representing groups and cooperatives of independent retailers, focusing on digital, internal market, and consumer law dossiers with a particular interest in competition issues. She holds a Master's degree in European law from Université Paris I Panthéon-Sorbonne (France).

=== Senior Legal and Policy Manager ===
Vanessa De Palma joined EMMA in 2019 and has over five years of experience in EU affairs and media and digital policy, covering data protection, advertising, consumer protection, press and media freedom, and freedom of expression. She holds a Master's degree in Political Economy of European Integration from HWR Berlin.

== Relevant EU Policy Initiatives ==
=== Advertising ===
Freedom to communicate commercially is a part of freedom of speech. It is often claimed that consumers must be protected through regulation on advertising for food, alcohol, medicines, toys, cars, etc.; bans and restrictions on the advertising of everyday products that every consumer can access freely in the EU will not be accepted by publishers.

=== Applicable law ===
Publishers require legal certainty, as regards defamation and private rights issues, in an age of more cross-border sales and the global nature of the internet. Country of origin is the only solution.

=== Freedom of expression ===
Freedom of Expression is the basis for Freedom of the Press, and consequently a central pillar of a publisher's raison d'être. FAEP defends the freedom of expression, thus promoting pluralism and diversity and ensuring that Europe's periodical press sector remains free.

=== Intellectual Property ===
Publishers encourage adequate protection and reward for those who invest in creativity. Therefore, the enforcement of copyright and strong enforcement of anti-piracy laws and introduction of the work for hire principle across the EU is supported by the periodical press.

=== Information society ===
Regulation that promotes the development of the digital economy, and does not thwart innovation, provides the right framework for a prospering publishing sector in the EU. Publishers demand technology neutral and level playing field as regards data use and protection.

=== VAT (EU VAT) ===
Publishers reject the taxation of reading. A literate and informed population is vital to a "knowledge society". The costs of illiteracy outweighs the revenues raised by taxing reading.

== EMMA publication ==
EMMA published a biennial magazine entitled Empowering Citizens, no longer mentioned on the FIPP Web site, with articles about the role of magazines in society.

== Awards ==
In 2008, European Federation of Magazine Publishers won the European Public Affairs Award.

== See also ==
- European Newspaper Publishers Association
