= European Newspaper Publishers' Association =

- Industry: Newspapers
- Founded: 1961
- Headquarters: Brussels, Belgium
- Key people: Jean-Pierre De Kerraoul, President; Valdo Lehari jr., Vice-President; Ilias Konteas, Executive Director
- Website: http://www.enpa.eu/

The European Newspaper Publishers' Association (ENPA) is an international non-profit group advocating the interests of the European newspaper publishing industry at different European and international organisations and institutions. ENPA's members together represent over 5,200 national, regional and local newspaper titles that in 2008 were bought by around 140 million people and read by 280 million people per day. Publishing industries as a whole constitute an important economic sector in the EU, then employing more than 750,000 people in 64,000 companies.

== Mission statement ==
The group exists to:

- enable European newspaper publishers to speak with one voice to European institutions and influence policy in publishers’ common interests;
- represent and defend the interests of the press related to legislative or policy issues that might affect their freedom or economic role;
- preserve and promote fundamental rights and in particular press freedom as a cornerstone of democracy, as well as commercial freedom as a precondition for economic viability;
- act as an early warning system for pending legislation or regulation, primarily from the European Union and Council of Europe;
- provide services to members and their publishers that are closely aligned to its lobbying mandate such as the transmission of information on the current state of legislative initiatives and their likely impact; and
- favour pluralism and diversity of media content.

ENPA is a member of the World Association of Newspapers, a non-profit, non-governmental organization made up of 76 national newspaper associations, 12 news agencies, 10 regional press organisations and individual newspaper executives in 100 countries.

ENPA is a registered observer at the Council of Europe where its delegates participate in the work of the Media and Information Society Division.

== History ==
It was founded in 1961 as the Communauté des Association d’Editeurs de Journaux du Marché Commun (the Confederation of Newspaper Publishers of the Common Market - CAEJ). it changed its name in the mid-1990s to ENPA – the European Newspaper Publishers’ Association. At the end of 2015, the association split into two entities. Half of the associations (national associations of Belgium (Dutch-speaking), Cyprus, Denmark, Estonia, Finland, Hungary, Netherlands, Norway, Republic of Ireland, Spain, Sweden and United Kingdom) created a new organisation under a new management/leadership structure which launched in January 2016: News Media Europe. The remaining members included the national associations of Austria, Belgium (French-speaking), Bulgaria, Czech Republic, France, Germany, Greece, Italy, Luxembourg, Poland, Serbia, Slovakia, and Switzerland.

== Issues ==
- Supports advertising self-regulation and opposes the introduction of any advertising restrictions.
- Seeks to ensure fair competition between all types of media and prevent state aid leading to the creation of a discriminatory environment.
- Seeks to protect the rights of copyright holders.
- Provides a framework within which newspaper publishers can share information and best practice on environmental issues;
- Urges manufacturers of paper and inks to continue research for more environmentally sustainable alternative models.
- Seeks to remind the European institutions that since media is predominantly a national product and that there is no lack of media pluralism at the European level, and in line with the principle of subsidiarity, there is no competence for the European Union to act.
- Seeks to promote the role of newspapers and the written press in enhancing media literacy;
- Provides a forum within which media literacy experts from across Europe can exchange best practices.
- Works to promote and protect press freedom and freedom of expression.
- Works to ensure that no communications or legislation at the European level include any mention of restriction to the right of the media to report on sports events or to the right of the public to receive newsworthy information.
- Supports the application of zero-rate VAT on newspaper sales, set by national governments, not at the European level.

== See also ==
- European Federation of Magazine Publishers
- Journalism
