= Hartlepool by-election =

Hartlepool by-election or The Hartlepools by-election may refer to:

- 1875 Hartlepool by-election
- 1910 The Hartlepools by-election
- 1914 The Hartlepools by-election
- 1943 The Hartlepools by-election
- 2004 Hartlepool by-election
- 2021 Hartlepool by-election
