= The Hartlepools =

Parliamentary constituency in the United Kingdom, 1868–1974

Coordinates: 54°39′N 1°16′W

- Former borough constituency for the House of Commons
- County: County Durham

1868–February 1974
- Seats: One
- Created from: South Durham
- Replaced by: Hartlepool

The Hartlepools /ˈhɑːrtlɪpuːlz/ HART-lih-poolz was a borough constituency represented in the House of Commons of the UK Parliament. The constituency became Hartlepool in 1974. The seat's name reflected the representation of both old Hartlepool and West Hartlepool.

== History ==
The Hartlepools was enfranchised as a borough constituency by the Reform Act 1867, being given one MP. It had previously been part of the two-MP county division of South Durham.

The constituency was renamed Hartlepool in 1974, following the administrative merger in 1967 of the local authorities covering the borough of Hartlepool and the county borough of West Hartlepool.

== Boundaries ==
=== 1868–1918 ===
The municipal borough of Hartlepool, and the townships of Throston, Stranton, and Seaton Carew.

See map on Vision of Britain website.

=== 1918–1974 ===
County borough of West Hartlepool and municipal borough of Hartlepool.

Boundaries redrawn in 1918, 1950 and 1955 to reflect changes to the boundaries of the two boroughs.

== Members of Parliament ==
Election	Member	Political party	Offices held
1868	Ralph Ward Jackson	Conservative	
1874	Thomas Richardson	Liberal	
1875 by-election	Lowthian Bell	Liberal	
1880	Thomas Richardson	Liberal	
1886	Thomas Richardson	Liberal Unionist	
1891 by-election	Christopher Furness	Liberal	
1895	Sir Thomas Richardson	Liberal Unionist	
1900	Sir Christopher Furness	Liberal	
1910 by-election	Stephen Furness	Liberal	
1914 by-election	Sir Walter Runciman	Liberal	
1918	W. G. Howard Gritten	Unionist	
1922	William Jowitt	Liberal	
1924	Sir Wilfrid Sugden	Unionist	
1929	W. G. Howard Gritten	Unionist	
1943 by-election	Thomas George Greenwell	Conservative	
1945	D. T. Jones	Labour	
1959	John Kerans	Conservative	
1964	Ted Leadbitter	Labour	

== Elections ==
=== Elections in the 1860s ===
General election 1868: The Hartlepools
Party	Candidate	Votes	%	±%
Conservative	Ralph Ward Jackson	1,550	50.0	
Liberal	Thomas Richardson	1,547	50.0	
Majority		3	0.0	
Turnout		3,097	79.0	
Registered electors		3,922		
Conservative win (new seat)				

=== Elections in the 1870s ===
General election 1874: The Hartlepools
Party	Candidate	Votes	%	±%
Liberal	Thomas Richardson	2,308	62.4	+12.4
Conservative	Ralph Ward Jackson	1,390	37.6	−12.4
Majority		918	24.8	N/A
Turnout		3,698	81.7	+2.7
Registered electors		4,524		
Liberal gain from Conservative		Swing	+12.4	

Richardson resigned, causing a by-election.

By-election, 29 Jul 1875: The Hartlepools
Party	Candidate	Votes	%	±%
Liberal	Lowthian Bell	1,982	53.5	−8.9
Conservative	William Joseph Young	1,464	39.5	+1.9
Magna Charta	Ahmed John Kenealy	259	7.0	New
Majority		518	14.0	−10.8
Turnout		3,705	76.9	−4.8
Registered electors		4,820		
Liberal hold		Swing	−5.4	

=== Elections in the 1880s ===
General election 1880: The Hartlepools
Party	Candidate	Votes	%	±%
Liberal	Thomas Richardson	1,965	37.2	−25.2
Liberal	Lowthian Bell	1,717	32.5	N/A
Conservative	Thomas Hutchinson Tristram	1,597	30.3	−7.3
Majority		120	4.7	−20.1
Turnout		5,279	79.0	−2.7
Registered electors		6,681		
Liberal hold		Swing	−9.0	

General election 1885: The Hartlepools
Party	Candidate	Votes	%	±%
Liberal	Thomas Richardson	3,669	58.3	+21.1
Conservative	Thomas Hutchinson Tristram	2,629	41.7	+11.4
Majority		1,040	16.6	+11.9
Turnout		6,298	74.1	−4.9
Registered electors		8,500		
Liberal hold		Swing	+7.2	

General election 1886: The Hartlepools
Party	Candidate	Votes	%	±%
Liberal Unionist	Thomas Richardson	3,381	57.8	+16.1
Liberal	Mervyn Lanark Hawkes	2,469	42.2	−16.1
Majority		912	15.6	N/A
Turnout		5,850	68.8	−5.3
Registered electors		8,500		
Liberal Unionist gain from Liberal		Swing	+16.1	

=== Elections in the 1890s ===
1891 The Hartlepools by-election
Party	Candidate	Votes	%	±%
Liberal	Christopher Furness	4,603	51.7	+9.5
Liberal Unionist	William Gray	4,305	48.3	−9.5
Majority		298	3.4	N/A
Turnout		8,908	85.8	+17.0
Registered electors		10,378		
Liberal gain from Liberal Unionist		Swing	+9.5	

General election 1892: The Hartlepools
Party	Candidate	Votes	%	±%
Liberal	Christopher Furness	4,626	50.4	+8.2
Liberal Unionist	Thomas Richardson (Note: Son of previous candidate with same name)	4,550	49.6	−8.2
Majority		76	0.8	N/A
Turnout		9,176	87.3	+18.5
Registered electors		10,513		
Liberal gain from Liberal Unionist		Swing	+8.2	

T. Richardson

General election 1895: The Hartlepools
Party	Candidate	Votes	%	±%
Liberal Unionist	Thomas Richardson	4,853	50.4	+0.8
Liberal	Christopher Furness	4,772	49.6	−0.8
Majority		81	0.8	N/A
Turnout		9,625	87.5	+0.2
Registered electors		10,999		
Liberal Unionist gain from Liberal		Swing	+0.8	

=== Elections in the 1900s ===
C. Furness

General election 1900: The Hartlepools
Party	Candidate	Votes	%	±%
Liberal	Christopher Furness	6,491	58.5	+8.9
Liberal Unionist	Thomas Richardson	4,612	41.5	−8.9
Majority		1,879	17.0	N/A
Turnout		11,103	86.4	−1.1
Registered electors		12,849		
Liberal gain from Liberal Unionist		Swing	+8.9	

General election 1906: The Hartlepools
Party	Candidate	Votes	%	±%
Liberal	Christopher Furness	Unopposed		
Liberal hold				

=== Elections in the 1910s ===
General election January 1910: The Hartlepools
Party	Candidate	Votes	%	±%
Liberal	Christopher Furness	6,531	53.2	N/A
Conservative	William Gritten	5,754	46.8	New
Majority		777	6.4	N/A
Turnout		12,285	89.6	N/A
Liberal hold		Swing	N/A	

S. Furness

1910 Hartlepool by-election
Party	Candidate	Votes	%	±%
Liberal	Stephen Furness	6,159	50.7	−2.5
Conservative	William Gritten	5,993	49.3	+2.5
Majority		166	1.4	−5.0
Turnout		12,152	88.6	−1.0
Liberal hold		Swing	-2.5	

General election December 1910: The Hartlepools
Party	Candidate	Votes	%	±%
Liberal	Stephen Furness	6,017	50.2	−0.5
Conservative	William Gritten	5,969	49.8	+0.5
Majority		48	0.4	−1.0
Turnout		11,936	87.4	−1.2
Liberal hold		Swing	-0.5	

General Election 1914–15:

Another General Election was scheduled to take place before the end of 1915. The political parties had been preparing for this election, and by July 1914, the following candidates had been selected:

- Liberal: Stephen Furness
- Unionist: William Gritten

W. Runciman

The Hartlepools by-election, 1914
Party	Candidate	Votes	%	±%
Liberal	Walter Runciman	Unopposed		
Liberal hold				

General election 1918: The Hartlepools
Party		Candidate	Votes	%	±%
	Unionist	William Gritten	13,003	51.3	+1.5
C	Liberal	Charles Macfarlane	7,647	30.1	−20.1
	Labour	Will Sherwood	4,733	18.6	New
Majority			5,356	21.2	N/A
Turnout			25,383	64.1	−23.3
	Unionist gain from Liberal		Swing		
C indicates candidate endorsed by the coalition government.

=== Elections in the 1920s ===
General election 1922: The Hartlepools
Party	Candidate	Votes	%	±%
Liberal	William Jowitt	18,252	50.8	+20.7
Unionist	William Gritten	17,685	49.2	−2.1
Majority		567	1.6	N/A
Turnout		35,937	87.2	+23.1
Liberal gain from Unionist		Swing	+11.4	

General election 1923: The Hartlepools
Party	Candidate	Votes	%	±%
Liberal	William Jowitt	17,101	46.4	−4.4
Unionist	William Gritten	16,956	46.1	−3.1
Labour	George Belt	2,755	7.5	New
Majority		145	0.3	−1.3
Turnout		36,812	87.5	+0.3
Liberal hold		Swing	-0.7	

General election 1924: The Hartlepools
Party	Candidate	Votes	%	±%
Unionist	Wilfrid Sugden	19,077	49.5	+3.4
Liberal	William Jowitt	15,724	40.8	−5.6
Labour	Craigie Aitchison	3,717	9.7	+2.2
Majority		3,353	8.7	N/A
Turnout		38,518	90.3	+2.8
Unionist gain from Liberal		Swing	+4.5	

General election 1929: The Hartlepools
Party	Candidate	Votes	%	±%
Unionist	William Gritten	17,271	38.0	−11.5
Liberal	Stephen Furness	17,133	37.7	−3.1
Labour	Gilbert Oliver	11,052	24.3	+14.6
Majority		138	0.3	−8.4
Turnout		45,456	85.9	−4.4
Unionist hold		Swing	-4.2	

=== Elections in the 1930s ===
General election 1931: The Hartlepools
Party	Candidate	Votes	%	±%
Conservative	William Gritten	30,842	68.1	+30.1
Labour	Alasdair MacGregor	14,462	31.9	+7.6
Majority		16,380	36.2	+35.9
Turnout		45,304	84.4	−1.5
Conservative hold		Swing	+15.0	

General election 1935: The Hartlepools
Party	Candidate	Votes	%	±%
Conservative	William Gritten	21,828	47.8	−20.3
Labour	Charles A. Goatcher	16,931	37.0	+5.1
Liberal	Joseph Scott-Cowell	6,939	15.2	New
Majority		4,897	10.8	−25.4
Turnout		45,698	83.0	−1.4
Conservative hold		Swing	-12.7	

=== Elections in the 1940s ===
General Election 1939–40

A General Election was scheduled to take place before the end of 1940. The parties had been preparing for this election, and by autumn 1939, the following candidates had been selected:

- Conservative: William Gritten
- Labour: D. T. Jones
- Liberal:

Hartlepool by-election, 1943
Party	Candidate	Votes	%	±%
Conservative	Thomas Greenwell	13,333	64.1	+16.3
Common Wealth	Elaine Burton	3,634	17.4	New
Independent Labour	Oswald Lupton	2,351	11.3	New
Independent Progressive	Reg Hipwell	1,510	7.2	New
Majority		9,699	46.7	+35.9
Turnout		20,828	39.5	−43.5
Conservative hold		Swing		

*Lupton stood as a 'People's' candidate

General election 1945: The Hartlepools
Party	Candidate	Votes	%	±%
Labour	D. T. Jones	16,502	41.2	+4.2
Conservative	Thomas Greenwell	16,227	40.5	−7.3
Liberal	Russell Vick	6,903	17.3	+2.1
National Independent	Harry Lane	390	1.0	New
Majority		275	0.7	N/A
Turnout		40,022	76.1	−6.9
Labour gain from Conservative		Swing		

=== Elections in the 1950s ===
General election 1950: The Hartlepools
Party	Candidate	Votes	%	±%
Labour	D. T. Jones	25,609	50.61	
Conservative	Thomas Greenwell	20,373	40.26	
Liberal	Francis John Long	4,623	9.14	
Majority		5,236	10.35	
Turnout		50,605	87.15	
Labour hold		Swing		

General election 1951: The Hartlepools
Party	Candidate	Votes	%	±%
Labour	D. T. Jones	27,147	52.63	
Conservative	Paul T Carter	24,437	47.37	
Majority		2,710	5.26	
Turnout		51,584	86.56	
Labour hold		Swing		

General election 1955: The Hartlepools
Party	Candidate	Votes	%	±%
Labour	D. T. Jones	25,145	51.63	
Conservative	Francis Henry Gerard Heron Goodhart	23,560	48.37	
Majority		1,585	3.26	
Turnout		48,705	81.84	
Labour hold		Swing		

General election 1959: The Hartlepools
Party	Candidate	Votes	%	±%
Conservative	John Kerans	25,463	50.2	+1.8
Labour	D. T. Jones	25,281	49.8	−1.8
Majority		182	0.4	N/A
Turnout		50,744	83.3	+1.5
Conservative gain from Labour		Swing		

=== Elections in the 1960s ===
General election 1964: The Hartlepools
Party	Candidate	Votes	%	±%
Labour	Edward Leadbitter	25,883	52.9	+3.1
Conservative	Geoffrey Dodsworth	23,016	47.1	−3.1
Majority		2,867	5.8	N/A
Turnout		48,899	81.9	−1.4
Labour gain from Conservative		Swing	+3.1	

General election 1966: The Hartlepools
Party	Candidate	Votes	%	±%
Labour	Edward Leadbitter	27,509	59.3	+6.4
Conservative	H Ian Bransom	18,857	40.7	−6.4
Majority		8,652	18.6	+12.8
Turnout		46,366	78.5	−3.4
Labour hold		Swing	+6.4	

=== Elections in the 1970s ===
General election 1970: The Hartlepools
Party	Candidate	Votes	%	±%
Labour	Edward Leadbitter	27,704	57.8	−1.5
Conservative	Michael Marshall	20,188	42.2	+1.5
Majority		7,516	15.6	−3.0
Turnout		47,892	74.4	−4.1
Labour hold		Swing	-1.5	

== See also ==
- History of parliamentary constituencies and boundaries in Durham
