= Stephen Furness (Sunderland MP) =

British barrister and Liberal National politician

Stephen Noel Furness (18 December 1902 – 14 April 1974), was a British barrister and Liberal National politician. He was Member of Parliament for Sunderland from 1935 to 1945. From 1938 to 1940 he was made a Lord Commissioner of the Treasury.

== Background ==
Furness was born the second son of Sir Stephen Wilson Furness, who was Liberal MP for The Hartlepools. He was younger brother of Sir Christopher Furness, 2nd Baronet. He was educated at Charterhouse School and Oriel College, Oxford.

== Professional career ==
Furness was Called to Bar by Middle Temple in 1927.

== Political career ==
Furness was Liberal candidate for The Hartlepools division of Durham at the 1929 General Election. His father had represented this constituency for the Liberals from 1910 to 1914. The Liberals had lost the seat to the Unionists at the previous election in 1924 by about 3,000 votes. A UK-wide Liberal revival in 1929 helped Furness, but not enough for him to re-take the seat, falling just 138 votes short. He was re-selected by the local Liberal Association to contest the following general election.

In 1931, following the economic crisis, a National Government was formed that included both Liberals and Conservatives. A snap election was called and Liberals were encouraged not to oppose sitting Conservative MPs. Furness thus withdrew as Liberal candidate on 14 October, just 13 days before polling day. Four years later, his personal sacrifice for the National Government was rewarded when he was chosen as a Liberal National candidate for the dual member seat of Sunderland. The Conservatives won both seats in 1931 when there were no Liberals standing. In 1935 one of those MPs retired and Furness was chosen to run in harness with the other Conservative. With no opposition Liberal candidates standing, he was easily elected, topping the poll.

In parliament he was Parliamentary Private Secretary to Sir John Simon, the Liberal National Leader, from 1936 to 1937. He was an Assistant Government Whip from 1937 to 1938 and a Junior Lord of the Treasury from 1938 to 1940. When the National Government of Neville Chamberlain fell in 1940 and Winston Churchill formed his Coalition Government, Furness went to the back benches. He served as a second lieutenant in the 1st Battalion, London Irish Rifles, which was commanded by the MP John Robert Jermain Macnamara. He was unmarried.

At the end of the war, he ran for re-election, again as a Liberal National in harness with a Conservative. However, this time he was defeated as the country turned to the Labour Party. He did not stand for parliament again.

=== Electoral record ===
General election 1929: The Hartlepools
Party	Candidate	Votes	%	±%
Unionist	William George Howard Gritten	17,271	38.0	−11.5
Liberal	Stephen Noel Furness	17,133	37.7	−3.1
Labour	Gilbert Oliver	11,052	24.3	+14.6
Majority		138	0.3	8.4
Turnout			85.9	−4.4
Unionist hold		Swing	-4.2	

General election 1935: Sunderland
Party	Candidate	Votes	%	±%
National Liberal	✓ Stephen Noel Furness	49,001	30.2	
Conservative	✓ Samuel Storey, jr.	48,760	30.0	
Labour	George Edward Gordon Catlin	32,483	20.0	
Labour	Elizabeth Leah Manning	32,059	19.8	
Majority		16,277	10.0	
Turnout			78.1	
Conservative hold		Swing		
National Liberal gain from Conservative		Swing		

General election 1945: Sunderland
Party	Candidate	Votes	%	±%
Labour	✓ Frederick Thomas Willey	38,769	28.1	
Labour	✓ Richard Ewart	36,711	26.6	
National Liberal	Stephen Noel Furness	29,366	21.3	
Conservative	Samuel Storey, jr.	28,579	20.7	
Communist	T.A. Richardson	4,501	3.3	
Majority		7,345	5.9	
Turnout			76.2	
Labour gain from Conservative		Swing		
Labour gain from National Liberal		Swing		

Parliament of the United Kingdom
Preceded by Luke Thompson and Samuel Storey	Member of Parliament for Sunderland; 1935–1945; With: Samuel Storey	Succeeded by Richard Ewart and Frederick Willey
