= Russell Vick =

English lawyer, judge and Liberal Party politician

Godfrey Russell-Vick KC in 1936

Sir Godfrey Russell-Vick QC (24 December 1892 – 27 September 1958) was an English lawyer, judge and Liberal Party politician.

== Background ==
Born at Strathmore House, West Hartlepool, the youngest son of Richard William Vick JP and Emily née Oughtred, he was educated at the Leys School and Jesus College, Cambridge, and played rugby for Hartlepool Rovers.

He married Marjorie Hester Compston and the couple had two daughters and two sons, the younger of whom, Sir Arnold Russell-Vick, also became a barrister then a judge.

== Professional career ==
In August 1914 Russell-Vick was commissioned into the 11th Battalion of the Durham Light Infantry, serving during World War I in France and Flanders. He was called to the Bar at the Inner Temple in 1917, and practised successfully as a criminal lawyer on the North East circuit. He served both as Chairman of the Bar Council and variously as Recorder of Richmond (1930-1931), Halifax (1931-1939) and Newcastle-upon-Tyne (1939-1956). Sworn as King's Counsel in 1935, he was then appointed a County Court Judge, becoming a Bencher of the Inner Temple, and knighted in 1950.

Russell-Vick's service on public enquiries included:

- London County Council remand homes (1944);
- The black market in petrol (1948);
- Lynskey tribunal into political corruption (1948);
- Ill-treatment of prisoners at HM Prison Liverpool (1958).

== Political career ==
He contested the constituency of Bishop Auckland at the 1918 General Election for the Coalition Liberals and finished second.

In 1919 Russell-Vick contested the constituency of Shoreditch in the 1919 London County Council election. He ran for the Liberal-backed Progressive Party and narrowly missed out on election.

He contested the constituency of the Hartlepools at the 1945 General Election for the Liberal Party coming third.

=== Electoral record ===
General Election 1918: Bishop Auckland
Party	Candidate	Votes	%	±%
Labour	Benjamin Charles Spoor	10,060		
National Liberal	Godfrey Russell-Vick	7,417		
Liberal	Dr Henzell Rutherford	2,411		
Majority				
Turnout				
Labour hold		Swing		

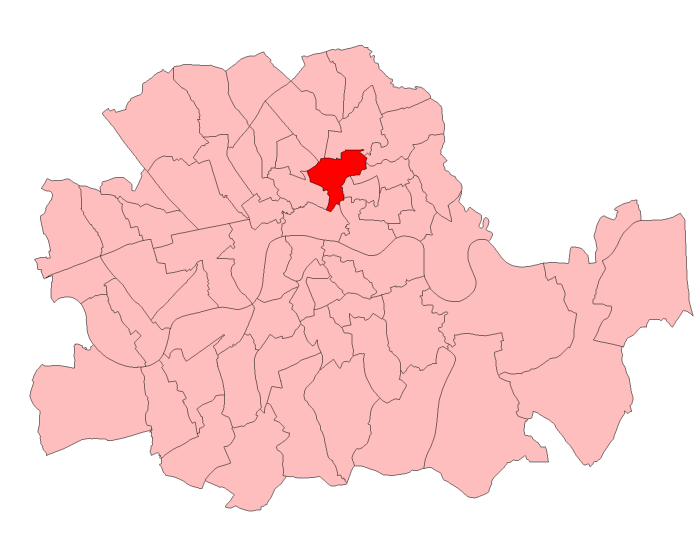
Shoreditch in London

London County Council election, 1919: Shoreditch
Party	Candidate	Votes	%	±%
Progressive	✓ Henry Ward	1,701		
Labour	✓ Charles Taylor	1,464	35.3	
Progressive	Godfrey Russell-Vick	1,454		
Municipal Reform	Major William Weber	1,116		
Municipal Reform	Rosamund Smith	1,110		
Majority				
Progressive hold		Swing		
Labour gain from Progressive		Swing		

General Election 1945: The Hartlepools
Party	Candidate	Votes	%	±%
Labour	David Thomas Jones	16,502	41.2	n/a
Conservative	Thomas George Greenwell	16,227	40.5	−23.6
Liberal	Godfrey Russell-Vick	6,903	17.3	n/a
Independent	Harry Lane	390	1.0	n/a
Majority		275	0.7	−46.0
Turnout			76.1	+36.6
Labour gain from Conservative		Swing	n/a	

== See also ==
- Worshipful Company of Curriers

== Bibliography ==
- Home Office (1945) "London County Council remand homes: report of Committee of Inquiry" Cmd.6594
- Home Office (1958) "Allegations of Ill-Treatment of Prisoners in Her Majesty's Prison, Liverpool" Cmnd.503
- Ministry of Fuel and Power.Committee on Petrol Rationing Control (1948) "Evasions of petrol rationing control" Cmd.7372
- Wade Baron, S. (1966). The Contact Man: The Story of Sidney Stanley and the Lynskey Tribunal. Secker & Warburg.
- "Vick, His Honour Judge Sir Godfrey Russell". Who Was Who 1897–2006. 2007.
