= Stephen Furness =

Stephen Furness may refer to:

- Sir Stephen Furness, 1st Baronet (1872–1914), ship-owner and member of parliament for The Hartlepools 1910–1914
  - HMS Stephen Furness, a Royal Navy armed boarding steamer
- Stephen Furness (Sunderland MP) (1902–1974), member of parliament for Sunderland 1935–1945
- Steve Furness (1950–2000), American footballer
