= Doctor of Laws =

Doctorate in legal studies

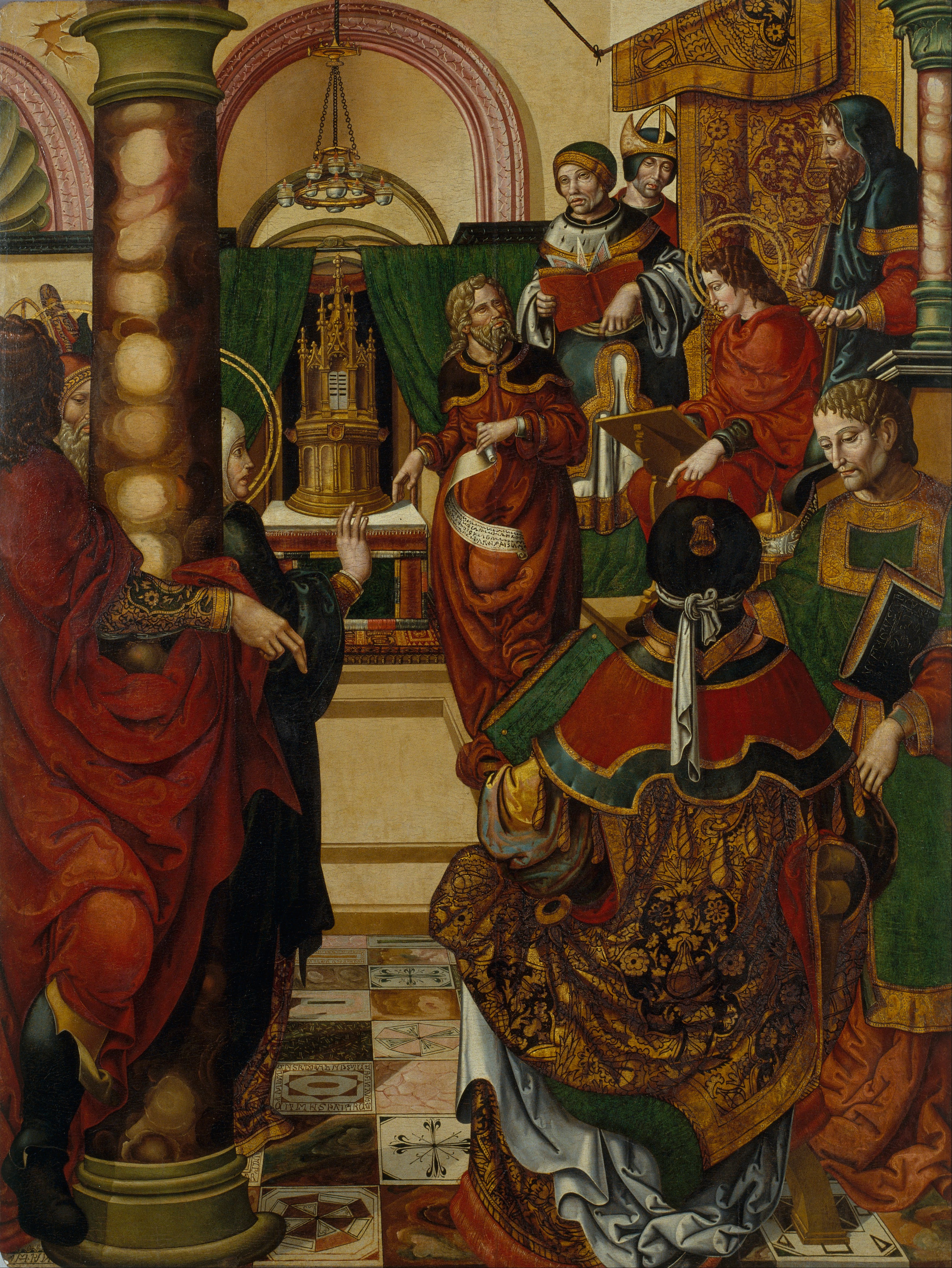
Jesus amongst the Doctors of the Law, Master of Sigena, active at the Monastery of Santa María de Sigena, 1515–1519 (current location: Museu Nacional d'Art de Catalunya)

A Doctor of Laws (LL.D.) is a doctoral degree in legal studies. The abbreviation LL.D. stands for Legum Doctor, with the double "L" in the abbreviation referring to the early practice in the University of Cambridge to teach both canon law and civil law (doctor of both laws). In some jurisdictions such as the United States, it is an honorary degree.

Other doctorates in law include Doctor of Juridical Science, Juris Doctor, and Doctor of Philosophy.

== European and Commonwealth usage ==
In the United Kingdom, Australia, New Zealand, and a number of European countries, the LL.D. is a higher doctorate usually awarded on the basis of exceptionally insightful and distinctive publications that contain significant and original contributions to the study of law. In South Africa, the LL.D. is awarded by many university law faculties as the highest degree in law, also based upon research and completion of a Ph.D. equivalent dissertation as in most European countries; see Doctor of Law in South Africa. The LL.D. may also be awarded as an honorary degree based upon a person's contributions to society.

=== Canada ===
In Canada, there are several academic law-related doctorates: the Doctor of Laws (LL.D.); Doctor of Juridical Science or Doctor of Legal Science (J.S.D./S.J.D); Doctor of Civil Law (D.C.L.); and the Doctor of Philosophy (Ph.D.). The Doctor of Jurisprudence (Juris Doctor or J.D.) is the professional doctoral degree that is usually required for admissions to post-graduate studies in law.

The first law degree was known until recently as the Bachelor of Laws (LL.B.). However, since law schools in Canada generally insist on a prior degree or some equivalent in order to grant admission, it was a more advanced degree than the LL.B. degrees awarded by programs abroad, which would accept high school graduates. Although despite this it is, along with other first professional degrees, considered to be a bachelor's degree-level qualification. The majority of Canadian universities now grant the Juris Doctor (J.D.) degree rather than the LL.B.; the University of Saskatchewan replaced its LL.B. with a J.D. in 2010, because the Canadian LL.B. is equivalent to the J.D.

All Canadian J.D. programs are three years, and all (except those in Quebec) have similar mandatory first-year courses: In "public", "constitutional," or "state" law; tort law; contract law; criminal law, and some sort of "professional practice" course. Beyond first year and the minimum requirements for graduation, course selection is elective, with various concentrations such as business law, international law, natural resources law, criminal law, and Aboriginal law.

After the first law degree, one may pursue a second, the Master of Laws (LL.M.) and after that, the Doctor of Philosophy (Ph.D.) or Doctor of Juridical Science or Doctor of Legal Science (J.S.D./S.J.D), at some Canadian universities. (The LL.D. is awarded by several universities only as an honorary degree, but when awarded by a law school is an earned degree). Of the universities in Canada that offer earned academic doctorates in law, four (University of Ottawa, University of Montreal, Laval University, and University of Quebec at Montreal) offer LL.Ds, five (University of Alberta, University of British Columbia, Osgoode Hall Law School of York University, Dalhousie University, and University of Victoria) offer Ph.D.s, only one (University of Toronto,) offers J.S.D./S.J.D degrees (Doctor of Juridical Science or Doctor of Legal Science), and one (McGill University) offers a D.C.L (Doctor of Civil Law). The differences largely reflect the divide between Canada's two legal systems (the common law and the civil law). Faculties that teach in the civil law tradition grant LL.D degrees, whereas those in the common law tradition grant either Ph.D.s or J.S.Ds. The York University Ph.D. in law was formerly termed Doctor of Jurisprudence (D.Jur.), until the name was changed in 2002.

Most Canadian universities that award the degree of Doctor of Laws (LL.D.) award it only as an honorary degree, but typically when awarded by a law school, it is an earned degree. Of the universities in Canada that offer earned doctorates in law, five Francophone or bilingual universities (Université de Sherbrooke, University of Ottawa, University of Montreal, Laval University, and University of Quebec at Montreal) offer the LL.D.

Lakehead University in Ontario, Canada, is one place that awards this popular honorary doctorate. At Lakehead it is regarded as the most appropriate award for a person distinguished in general service to the state, to learning and to mankind.

=== South Africa ===
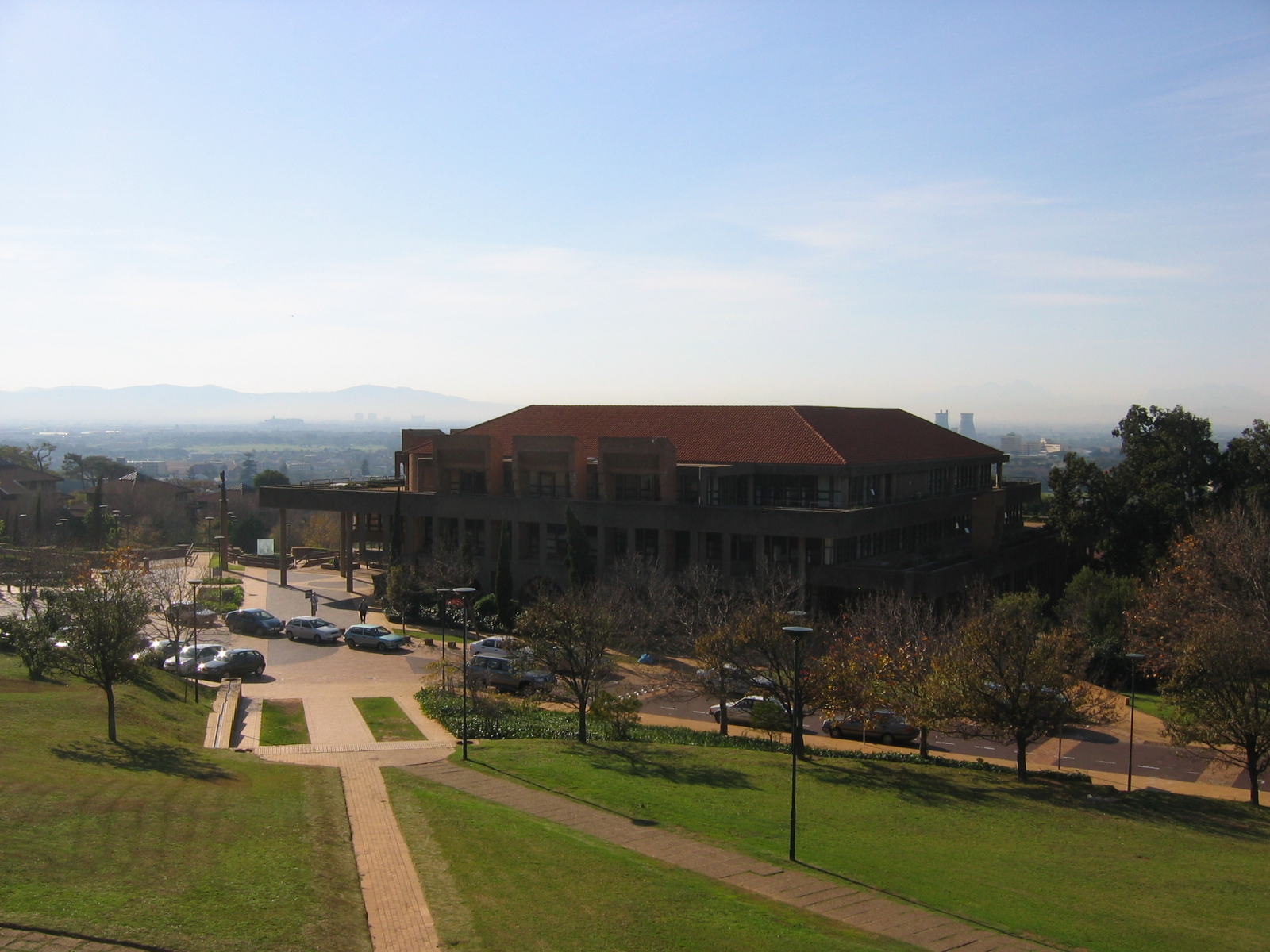
University of Cape Town Kramer Law School

In South Africa the doctorate in law is offered as a research doctorate of at least two years duration, in various specialised areas of law. In general, South African universities offer either the PhD or the LLD, with no significant difference between these. (At UCT, UKZN and Wits, the PhD is the research doctorate, while the LLD is the higher doctorate; SU and UWC offer the LLD to law graduates, and the PhD to other graduates researching a legal-related topic).

In order to obtain the degree, the student will complete a thesis under the guidance of a supervisor, after completion of a module in research methodology, the submission of a research proposal and an oral examination. The thesis will demonstrate evidence of in-depth independent research and understanding of the topic, and constitute an original scientific contribution. Admission is usually on the basis of an LLM, and in some cases an LLB.

=== United Kingdom ===
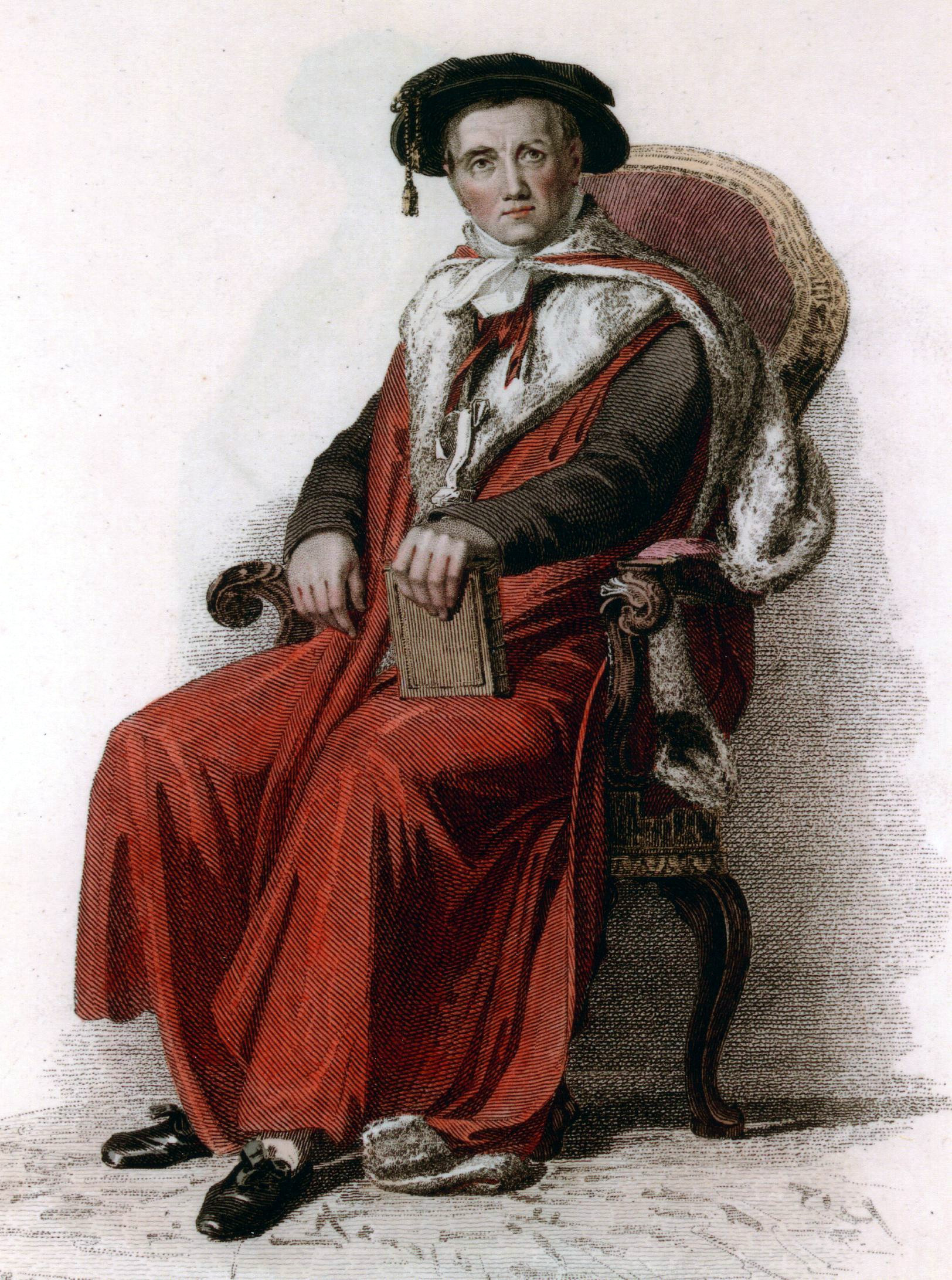
Cambridge Doctor of Laws, 1815 (illustration by John Samuel Agar)

In the UK, the degree of Doctor of Laws is a higher doctorate, ranking above the PhD, awarded upon submission of a portfolio of advanced research. It is also often awarded honoris causa to public figures (typically those associated with politics or the law) whom the university wishes to honour. In most British universities, the degree is styled "Doctor of Laws" and abbreviated LLD; however, some universities award instead the degree of Doctor of Civil Law, abbreviated DCL, or Doctor of Law, still abbreviated LLD. Cambridge now gives the degree the name Doctor of Law in English. This contrasts with the practice of the University of Oxford, where the degree that survived from the Middle Ages is the DCL or Doctor of Civil Law (only).

In former years, Doctors of Law were a distinct form of lawyer who were empowered to act as advocates in civil law courts. The Doctors had their own Society called Doctors' Commons, but following reforms in the nineteenth century their exclusive rights of audience were shared with barristers, and the last member of the college died in 1912. Due to the possession of a doctorate, the Doctors of Law had precedence equal to that of a Serjeant-at-Law and for this reason the convention remains that advocates holding junior doctorates (such as Doctors of Philosophy) should not be addressed as "doctor" in an English court.

In former years, Doctors of Law were a distinct form of Attorney-at-Law who were empowered to act as advocates in the ecclesiastical, probate and admiralty courts. The Doctors had their own Inn, which was called Doctors' Commons. Charles Dickens spent some of his youth working in this branch of the law. The last surviving member of Doctors' Commons, Dr Thomas Tristram, wrote the first editions of a textbook on trusts still in use today. In 1954, a case was brought under long-dormant law in the High Court of Chivalry. The opening arguments in that case were by George Drewry Squibb, who was simultaneously distinguished as a barrister, a doctor of laws, and a historian. Squibb argued, to the satisfaction of the court, that since the modern class of Doctors of Laws were no longer trained as advocates, their role must necessarily be performed by barristers. This was because Victorian reforms, which had unified the other classes of court attorney into the single profession of Barrister, had overlooked the Doctors of Law.

== Other countries ==
=== Argentina ===
In Argentina the Doctor of Laws or Doctor of Juridical Sciences is the highest academic qualification in the field of Jurisprudence. To obtain the doctoral degree the applicant must have previously achieved, at least the undergraduate degree of Attorney. (Título de Abogado). The doctorates in jurisprudence in Argentina might have different denominations as is described as follow:

- Doctorate in Law (Offered by the University of Buenos Aires, NU of the L, and NU of R)
- Doctorate in Criminal Law
- Doctorate in Criminal Law and Criminal Sciences
- Doctorate in Juridical Sciences
- Doctorate in Juridical and Social Sciences (Offered by the NU of C)
- Doctorate in Private Law (Offered by the NU of T)
- Doctorate in Public Law and Government Economics (Offered by the NU of T)

=== Brazil ===
In Brazil, the Doctor of Laws degree, known in Portuguese as Doutor em Direito or Doutor em Ciências Jurídicas, is the highest academic degree in law available.

In a few universities there is a higher title known as livre docência, like the habilitation in some European countries. However, this higher title is not a degree in the strict sense, because livre docência nowadays is an internal title, that applies solely within the institution granting it.

In the past, livre docência was a degree in the fullness of the term, and a professor bearing the title would enjoy the privileges of livre docência if he transferred from one institution to another; there are still living professors who hold the "old" livre docência degrees; but all new titles of that name only confer privileges within the institution granting it.

The doctoral degree is awarded upon the completion and the successful defense of a thesis prepared by the doctoral candidate under the supervision of a tutor. The thesis must be examined by a board of five professors, holders of the title of doctor or of a livre docência. Two of the members of the board must be professors from another institution. In most Brazilian Law Schools, the candidates are also required to earn a minimum number of credits.

Unlike the rules of other countries, the Brazilian norms governing the grant of doctoral titles do not require the publication of the thesis as a precondition for the award of the degree. Nevertheless, copies of the thesis must be delivered to the institution's library. Usually, doctoral thesis are published by specialized editors after the grant of the doctoral title.

If one obtains a doctoral title in a foreign country, one cannot enjoy the academic privileges of the title in Brazil unless the title be first validated by a Brazilian University. In that case, the doctor asking for the validation of the title will present his thesis and other documents relating to his foreign doctoral course to a board examiners of the Brazilian University and the examiners will then pass judgement on whether the work done by the candidate adheres to the minimum standards of quality that are usually required by a Brazilian university when granting doctoral degrees.

Admission to doctoral courses is almost universally reserved to holders of a master's degree (the Master's in Brazil is a graduate degree and is not the first professional degree). Therefore, a bachelor of Laws (a bearer of the first professional degree), seeking the degree of doctor must usually complete a postgraduate course to attain the degree of Master of Laws (to attain that degree one must write and defend a dissertation before a panel of three professors, bearing the title of master, doctor or a "livre docência, and also complete credits), and only then, after being a Master of Laws, one will apply for admission to a doctoral course.

There are, however, a few universities that allow "direct" admission to the doctoral course without previous completion of the Master's course in exceptional circumstances. Thus, in rare cases, a bachelor of Laws (i.e., a holder of the first professional degree), can be admitted directly to a doctoral course.

Usually, one is allowed three years time to complete a Master of Laws degree, and four years time to complete the doctoral course. There has been a shift towards shortening these periods to two and three years respectively. So, if one were to graduate from Law School and immediately enter a Master of Laws course and a Doctor of Laws course in immediate succession, that person would become a doctor about seven years (five in current trend) after graduating from the Law School. On the other hand, in the rare cases in which a bachelor of Laws is allowed to pursue a "direct" doctorate, he is usually allowed five (four in current trend) years time to complete the doctoral course. Sometimes however, depending on the student's prowess or previous knowledge, it is possible to get a master's degree or a doctoral degree in less time, if one were to complete all credits and write the dissertation/thesis in less time. Usually, universities require a minimum time for this (normally, 15 months of credits + 3 months of dissertation qualification for a master's degree, 24 months of credits + 6 months of thesis qualification for a doctoral degree).

=== Czechia and Slovakia ===
In the Czech Republic and Slovakia the Doctor is a postgraduate degree in two types – as a professional degree in law (JUDr) and a research doctorate (PhD).

JUDr, Juris Utriusque Doctor ('Doctor of Both Laws' i.e. Civil [secular] and Church [Canon] laws) is a degree with a tradition of several centuries, originally the highest possible degree. Nowadays, its scholarly importance is quite limited, but it serves as a traditional and popular badge degree, especially useful for attorneys. In older times with no master's degree, JUDr. served as the only law degree; it was roughly equivalent to today's master's degree, plus a special exam. Requirements for obtaining a JUDr degree are a highly rated Master (Mgr.) degree in law, the compilation of a thesis – including successful defense – and passing an oral exam called Rigorosum. The thesis itself is also sometimes called Rigorosum. Many JUDr. theses were based on the students' previous Master theses; however, nowadays universities require that the dissertation work be completely original.

Doctoral studies leading to PhD degree are different from the JUDr exam. Internally undertaken PhD studies last 3–5 years; the PhD student is at the same time a teacher at the university. External PhD studies may be up to 8 years long. PhD students are obliged to pass some exams during the studies and mainly to work on their dissertation. The PhD is intended basically for candidates interested in an academic career, and it gives them the right to teach at a university.

The Czech system is in many ways similar to the German and Austrian systems. Therefore, a PhD degree is necessary for habilitation procedure. Through habilitation, the Doctor of Law who submits his habilitation work (similar to German Habilitationsschrift) can be given a capacity and title of Docent (Doc.), similar to German Dozent, Privatdozent or US assistant professor. Docent is not a degree, but a scholar's title.

Only a docent can be appointed a professor through a special procedure. Unlike Germany (and unlike the traditional Czech practice), a professor is not a function (a seat, Cathedra) at a university, but a scholarly title. This leads to many problems, especially the phenomenon of so-called "flying professors", who are teaching at two or three universities at the same time and to the decline of academic life.

=== Finland ===
In Finland, the Doctor of Laws (Finnish: Oikeustieteen tohtori, OTT; Swedish: Juris doktor, JD) is the highest academic degree in law, based on 60 credits of course studies and, most importantly, successful completion of a doctoral dissertation. The dissertation usually takes the form of a monograph at least of 250 pages in length, or of a series of published articles. A successful oral defence is also required. It usually takes at least four years to complete the degree.

The degree of the Doctor of Laws does not qualify its holder for judicial offices. Instead, the degree of the Master of Laws (Finnish: Oikeustieteen maisteri; Swedish uses the Latin: Juris magister) is the prerequisite for judicial offices and a requirement for membership in the Finnish Bar Association. Membership in the Bar further requires several years of professional experience and passing the Finnish Bar Examination. As doctoral programs are, in principle, open to holders of any master's degree, a Doctor of Laws degree does not guarantee that the holder also holds a Master of Laws degree. However, it is not common for an individual without a prior law degree to earn a Doctor of Laws.

=== France ===
In France, the Doctor of Law degree (doctorat en droit) is a PhD (diplôme national de doctorat). It entitles the holder to the title of doctor (docteur), abbreviated as Dr. It lasts a minimum of three years, but in fact takes an average of five or six years to complete. The PhD in law is required to teach at the university level as a maître de conférences (approximate to the German docent, British reader or Commonwealth systems' associate professor). To become Professor of Law, holders of a PhD in law have to meet additional requirements such as passing an additional competitive exam: the agrégation de droit. Only the first year ("master" 1 or maîtrise) of the master's degree in law is necessary to pass the bar exam, but, from 2025, a master's degree will be compulsory for admission to the bar after passing the bar exam.

=== Germany ===
The Doctor of Laws (Doktor der Rechte) is the terminal degree in law, abbreviated as Dr. iur. (Doctor iuris) or Dr. jur. (Doctor juris). The terminology varies: while most universities refer to the degree as Doctor of Laws (Doktor der Rechte [pl.], e.g., LMU Munich, the University of Münster, the Humboldt University of Berlin, the University of Cologne, the University of Tübingen, and the University of Göttingen), some others refer to it either as Doctor of Jurisprudence (Doktor der Rechtswissenschaft, e.g. Heidelberg University, the University of Hamburg) or Doctor of Law (Doktor des Rechts [sing.], e.g., the Free University of Berlin). It is conferred based on a thesis consisting of a suitable body of original academic research, and an oral examination (Rigorosum or Disputation). The thesis must have been published as a book or – less common – as a series of articles in a peer-reviewed law journal before the degree can be formally conferred. Admission usually requires the grade of "Fully Satisfactory" (approximately top quintile of class) in the student's first Staatsexamen (the Master's level first professional degree), or, alternatively, in the second Staatsexamen (the German equivalent to the bar exam, which to pass is itself no requirement for the doctorate, though practically universal for jurist careers in academia), or a relative grade A (highest decile of the comparison group) Master of Laws. No LL.D. to complement an LL.M. is distinguished in the German academic system.

The Doctor of Both Laws (Doktor beider Rechte), awarded as Dr. iur. utr. (Doctor iuris utriusque, conferred e.g. in Würzburg) is rare, since it means considering both the secular law of the Civil Law system and Canonical Law. A doctorate solely in the latter area is the degree of Dr. iur. can. (Doctor iuris canonici).

Approximately ten percent of German law graduates hold a doctoral degree. However, the Doctor of Laws is still only the first step to tenure at German law schools. Despite the initiative to establish a junior professorship with tenure option after five to seven years, and special professorships specializing in teaching (Lehrprofessur), to become a university professor of law a habilitation (de iure not an academic degree) is still mandatory at most German law schools.

Germany, as in many other continental European countries, does not distinguish between PhD and LL.D. academic degrees. German universities award the doctoral degree in law as a "Doctor of Law" (Dr. iur.) instead of a PhD, which literally means "Doctor of Philosophy" (Dr. phil.), and is traditionally reserved for doctoral dissertations in the field of social and political sciences. The degree of Dr. iur. usually requires independent academic research of up to 4 years. The doctor of law as an honorary degree is called "doctor iuris honoris causa" (Dr. iur. h.c.). The German academic system also knows a form of higher doctorate in law which is awarded after completion of a second dissertation (Habilitation) and is a prerequisite to teach law at (German) universities. The completion of the habilitation is indicated by adding "habil." to the title (Dr. iur. habil.) unless one holds a professorship, in which case the habilitation is implied by using the title "Prof. Dr.".

Most German doctoral degrees in law are awarded as "Doktor der Rechte", "Doktor des Rechts" or "Doktor der Rechtswissenschaft" and would be abbreviated in the Latin form as "Dr. iur." or "Dr. jur.". If the dissertation is in the area of church laws, traditional universities may award the very rare degree of "Doktor beider Rechte" translating to doctor of both laws (Latin form: "doctor iuris utriusque" or "Dr. iur. utr."), emphasizing that the doctoral degree is in worldly and religious laws.

=== Indonesia ===
In Indonesia, Doctor of Law is known as Doktor Hukum and is the highest academic level in legal education. The writing of the title is simply abbreviated as Dr., as also applies to fields of education other than Law. Concentration in the field of law according to the choice concerned, for example Constitutional Law, Civil Law, Criminal Law. International Law or more specifically, for example Business Law, Marriage Law, Transportation Law, Labor Law, etc. In the education system in Indonesia, the Doctor of Law degree is included in Strata (Level) 3 and is pursued after completing Masters (Strata 2-post graduate) and Bachelor of Law (Strata 1-undergraduate) education. Graduates of the Strata 2 program in the field of Law are called Magister Hukum - M.H (Master of Laws) and graduates of the Strata 1 program are called Sarjana Hukum - S.H (Bachelors of Laws). Everyone with Bachelors of Laws degree holder may apply to be a certified lawyer after completing the requirements as regulated in Indonesian Law Number 18 of 2003 concerning Advocates but it is not permissible for someone with the status of a civil servant, member of the military, police, prosecutor, judge or state official.

=== Italy ===
In Italy, the title of "Magister Doctor of Law" (Dottore magistrale in Giurisprudenza) is the title given to students who complete the five-year Laurea magistrale degree.

Despite the adoption of the Bologna process, in Italy law remains a field that retains the traditional Italian system.

Once a prospective lawyer has been awarded the Magister Doctor of Law and worked 18 months as a trainee lawyer, he or she is required to pass a state bar examination in order to be licensed to practice as an attorney at law (Avvocato). Previously, dottore in giurisprudenza was the title given to the students that completed the old (four-year) course of studies in law. After the five-year degree, it is possible to enrol in a Ph.D. course in a specific field of law ("Dottorato"), and the title obtained is "Dottore di ricerca" (a Ph.D.).

=== Malta ===
In Malta, the European Union's smallest member state, the LL.D. was a doctorate-level academic degree in law requiring at least three years of post-graduate full-time study at the University of Malta, Malta's national university. At least three years of previous law study were required for entry. Students were required to complete coursework in a number of core areas of law, as well as to submit a thesis which is to be "an original work on the approved subject or other contribution to the knowledge showing that he/she has carried out sufficient research therein". It confers the title of Doctor, which in Malta is used to address a holder of the degree. Up until 2014, the LL.D. was one of the requirements for admission to the profession of advocate in Malta (an advocate, as opposed to a legal procurator, has rights of representation in superior courts).

Practising lawyers are of three designations – notary, legal procurator and advocate. The Bachelor of Laws (LL.B.) degree is an undergraduate degree that of itself is not sufficient for admission into any of the legal professions. A one-year full-time taught post-graduate diploma of Notary Public (N.P.) is required after the LL.B. for admission to the profession of notary public, while a taught post-graduate diploma of Legal Procurator (L.P.) is required for admission to the profession of legal procurator. A legal procurator has rights of audience in the lower courts, a profession that was existent in Malta as early, and even prior to 1553. All three designations also require members to be holders of a warrant issued by the president of Malta, obtainable after examination, as well as a minimum of one year of work experience in that profession. It is not possible for a Maltese lawyer to hold a warrant in more than one of the professions at a time.

As of 2014 changes to the law course resulted from the implementation of the Bologna Process, removed the Doctorate of Laws (LLD) title and replace it with a second cycle degree, Master of Advocacy (M.Adv). This raised discussion as to whether newly qualified lawyers would be referred to as 'Doctor', as had been the norm. Following representation from law student organisations, the Chamber of Advocates came to the agreement that if a newly qualified lawyer was to self-stylise as 'Doctor' they would be supported, as a matter of convention.

Notable holders of the LL.D. degree include Ugo Mifsud Bonnici, Guido de Marco, George Borg Olivier, and Lawrence Gonzi.

=== Netherlands ===
The Netherlands does not distinguish doctorates between disciplines. A legal scholar pursuing a doctorate will receive the PhD degree. For holders of a master in law (LLM) in Dutch indicated with Mr., the Dr. title can be added to their title. Unique to law degrees is that a legal scholar with a PhD in law will add the title after their Mr. title (Mr. Dr. Anyone), while a person with an LLM title gaining a PhD in a different discipline (e.g. economics) will add the Dr title before their law master title (Dr. Mr. Someone).

=== Sweden ===
In Sweden, the Doctor of Laws (LLD) is the highest academic degree in law. It is a research degree, which combines 240 credit hours (or equivalent of four full-time years of work). Candidates have the option to complete a dissertation or a monograph of a series of published articles. Although not required to practice law, the LLD is a prerequisite for an academic career.

=== United States ===
In the United States, the most common Doctor of Law degree is the Juris Doctor (or Doctor of Jurisprudence), abbreviated as J.D. It is the professional degree for lawyers, having replaced the Bachelor of Laws in the 20th century after law schools began to require a Bachelor's degree before admission to a J.D. program to study law for three years. A research dissertation is not required for the J.D., but the American Bar Association issued a Council Statement stating that the J.D. should be considered equivalent to the Ph.D. for educational employment purposes. In recent years, some universities also have developed other new interdisciplinary professional doctorates that may combine law and other specialized or applied fields. One example of this is Northeastern University's Doctor of Law and Policy (D.L.P.) degree.

Additionally, other universities award a higher postdoctoral research degree in law, the Doctor of Juridical Science (or Scientiae Juridicae Doctor), abbreviated as S.J.D. or D.J.S. Applicants for S.J.D. programs must first earn a J.D., and some programs require both a J.D. and an LL.M. before admission. Similar to the Ph.D., the S.J.D. is a research doctorate and has been described as the "highest degree in law" by the University of Virginia, as well as the "terminal degree in law for individuals interested in academia" by Indiana University and the "most advanced law degree" by Harvard Law School. It has also been called the "most advanced law degree" by Yale Law School, Georgetown Law, New York University, and Stanford University. The University of Connecticut School of Law explains that this specific degree is "intended for individuals who have demonstrated evidence of superior scholarly potential."

The National Association of Legal Professionals states that the S.J.D./D.J.S. is "the most advanced or terminal law degree that would follow the earning of the LL.M. and J.D. degrees." It typically requires three to five years to complete and requires an advanced study in law as a scientific discipline and a dissertation, which serves as an original contribution to the scholarly field of law.

The S.J.D. degree is primarily a degree pursued by foreign-trained lawyers who seek to teach in the United States. Few American-trained lawyers pursue an S.J.D. as it is not required for obtaining a faculty position at a U.S. law school. The overwhelming majority of U.S. law school tenure-track faculty have only a J.D., but an extensive post-J.D. publication record is a pre-requisite for a tenure-track position at elite and elite-adjacent institutions (Tier 1 and Tier 2 schools).

As with most other countries, in the United States, the Legum Doctor (LL.D.), also colloquially known in English as Doctor of Laws, is granted only as an honorary degree. At the University of Kansas, the LL.D. is awarded for notable service to humanity or the professions or contributions to the general welfare of the state, the nation, or the world. The University of Washington gives this degree for recognition to those who have made profound and enduring contributions to scholarship, culture, and improved quality of life in society at large in the area of law, public policy, and public service.

== See also ==
- Doctor of Canon Law (J.C.D.)
- Doctor Juris Utriusque (D.J.U.)
- Doctor of Philosophy (Ph.D.)
- Doctor of Law and Policy (DLP)
- Doctor of Juridical Science (S.J.D. or J.S.D.)
- Juris Doctor (J.D.)
- Master of Laws (LL.M.)
- Bachelor of Laws (LL.B.)
