= 1943 The Hartlepools by-election =

UK Parliamentary by-election

The Hartlepools by-election of 1943 was held on 1 June 1943. The by-election was held due to the death of the incumbent Conservative MP, William George Howard Gritten. It was won by the Conservative candidate Thomas George Greenwell, who was not opposed by a Liberal or a Labour candidate due to the war time electoral truce where the main parties pledged not to oppose each other's candidates until the end of the Second World War.

The Hartlepools 1943 by-election
Party	Candidate	Votes	%	±%
Conservative	Thomas George Greenwell	13,333	64.1	+16.3
Common Wealth	Elaine Burton	3,634	17.4	New
Independent Labour	Oswald Lupton	2,351	11.3	New
Independent Progressive	William Reginald Hipwell	1,510	7.2	New
Majority		9,699	46.7	+35.9
Turnout		20,828	39.5	−43.5
Conservative hold		Swing		
