= William Reginald Hipwell =

William Reginald Hipwell or Reg Hipwell (died 1966) was a populist forces journalist and parliamentary candidate.

== Background ==
Hipwell was born in Olney, Buckinghamshire. He attended Rugby School. He was President of the Horse-Brass Society.

== Career ==
Hipwell was the founder and editor of Reveille, a " barrack room newspaper for the fighting forces", and stood as an Independent Progressive in four Parliamentary by-elections during the Second World War when the major parties honoured a war time electoral truce. His campaigns focused on complaints about the conditions of services personnel. He campaigned for an increase in pay for servicemen and their dependents. He said that he admired "many of the planks in the Conservative platform, yet he felt he also stood for the best that the Labour and Liberal parties had to offer". He was also the agent for the successful independent candidate, William Brown in the 1942 Rugby by-election. At the 1945 General Election he contested Eastbourne as an Independent National, finishing fourth and did not stand for parliament again.

== Electoral record ==
1941 Hampstead by-election
| Party | Candidate | Votes | % | ±% |
|---|---|---|---|---|
| Conservative | Charles Challen | 7,630 | 67.4 | −5.8 |
| National | Noel Pemberton Billing | 2,734 | 24.1 | N/A |
| Independent Progressive | William Hipwell | 636 | 5.6 | N/A |
| Independent | A.L. Dolland | 326 | 2.9 | N/A |
| Majority | | 4,896 | 43.3 | N/A |
| Turnout | | 65,511 | 17.3 | −41.7 |
| Conservative hold | | Swing | N/A | |

1941 Scarborough and Whitby by-election
| Party | Candidate | Votes | % | ±% |
|---|---|---|---|---|
| Conservative | Alexander Spearman | 12,518 | 60.8 | |
| Independent Progressive | William Hipwell | 8,086 | 39.2 | |
| Majority | | 4,432 | | |
| Turnout | | | 35.9 | |
| Conservative hold | | Swing | | |

1942 Salisbury by-election
| Party | Candidate | Votes | % | ±% |
|---|---|---|---|---|
| Conservative | John Morrison | 12,076 | 67.8 | −3.7 |
| Independent Progressive | William Hipwell | 3,218 | 18.1 | N/A |
| Independent Democrat | J. D. Monro | 2,519 | 14.1 | N/A |
| Majority | | 8,858 | 49.7 | +6.7 |
| Turnout | | 17,813 | 39.7 | −26.5 |
| Conservative hold | | Swing | | |

1943 The Hartlepools by-election
| Party | Candidate | Votes | % | ±% |
|---|---|---|---|---|
| Conservative | Thomas Greenwell | 13,333 | 64.1 | +16.3 |
| Common Wealth | Elaine Burton | 3,634 | 17.4 | n/a |
| The People's Candidate | Oswald Tupton | 2,351 | 11.3 | n/a |
| Independent Progressive | William Hipwell | 1,510 | 7.2 | n/a |
| Majority | | 9,699 | 46.7 | +36.0 |
| Turnout | | | 39.5 | −43.8 |
| Conservative hold | | Swing | n/a | |

General Election 1945: Eastbourne
| Party | Candidate | Votes | % | ±% |
|---|---|---|---|---|
| Conservative | Charles Taylor | 18,173 | 53.24 | |
| Labour | Duncan Newman Smith | 12,637 | 37.02 | |
| Liberal | John Stafford Gowland | 2,797 | 8.19 | |
| Independent National | William Hipwell | 524 | 1.54 | |
| Majority | | 5,536 | 16.22 | |
| Turnout | | | 77.35 | |
| Conservative hold | | Swing | | |
