= 1941 Hampstead by-election =

UK parliamentary by-election

The 1941 Hampstead by-election was a by-election held for the British House of Commons constituency of Hampstead in London on 27 November 1941.

The seat had become vacant on the death of the constituency's Conservative Member of Parliament (MP), George Balfour.

== Candidates ==
In accordance with the war-time electoral pact, neither the Labour nor the Liberal parties fielded a candidate. The Conservative candidate was Charles Challen. Challen was opposed by three independents who were not affected by the pact.

Noel Pemberton Billing had been MP for Hertford from 1916 to 1921. He stood as a National Independent, although he was not supported by the Government.

Billing had won a by-election during the First World War as a right-wing independent and was seeking to replicate his success. He stood on a policy of aerial reprisals against Nazi Germany.

William Reginald Hipwell, editor of Reveille, a " barrack room newspaper for the fighting forces", stood as an Independent Progressive. This was a label which had been common in by-elections in 1938, as part of Popular Front agreements opposed to the Munich Agreement and the leadership of Neville Chamberlain.

A.L. Dolland stood as an independent, and advocated all-out aid to the Soviet Union.

== Election result ==
Hampstead by-election, 1941
Party	Candidate	Votes	%	±%
Conservative	Charles Challen	7,630	67.4	−5.8
National	Noel Pemberton Billing	2,734	24.1	New
Independent Progressive	William Reginald Hipwell	636	5.6	New
Independent	A. L. Dolland	326	2.9	New
Majority		4,896	43.3	−11.9
Turnout		11,326	17.3	−41.7
Conservative hold		Swing		

== See also ==
- Hampstead constituency
- List of United Kingdom by-elections
