= Sunbeam (steam yacht) =

British steam yacht

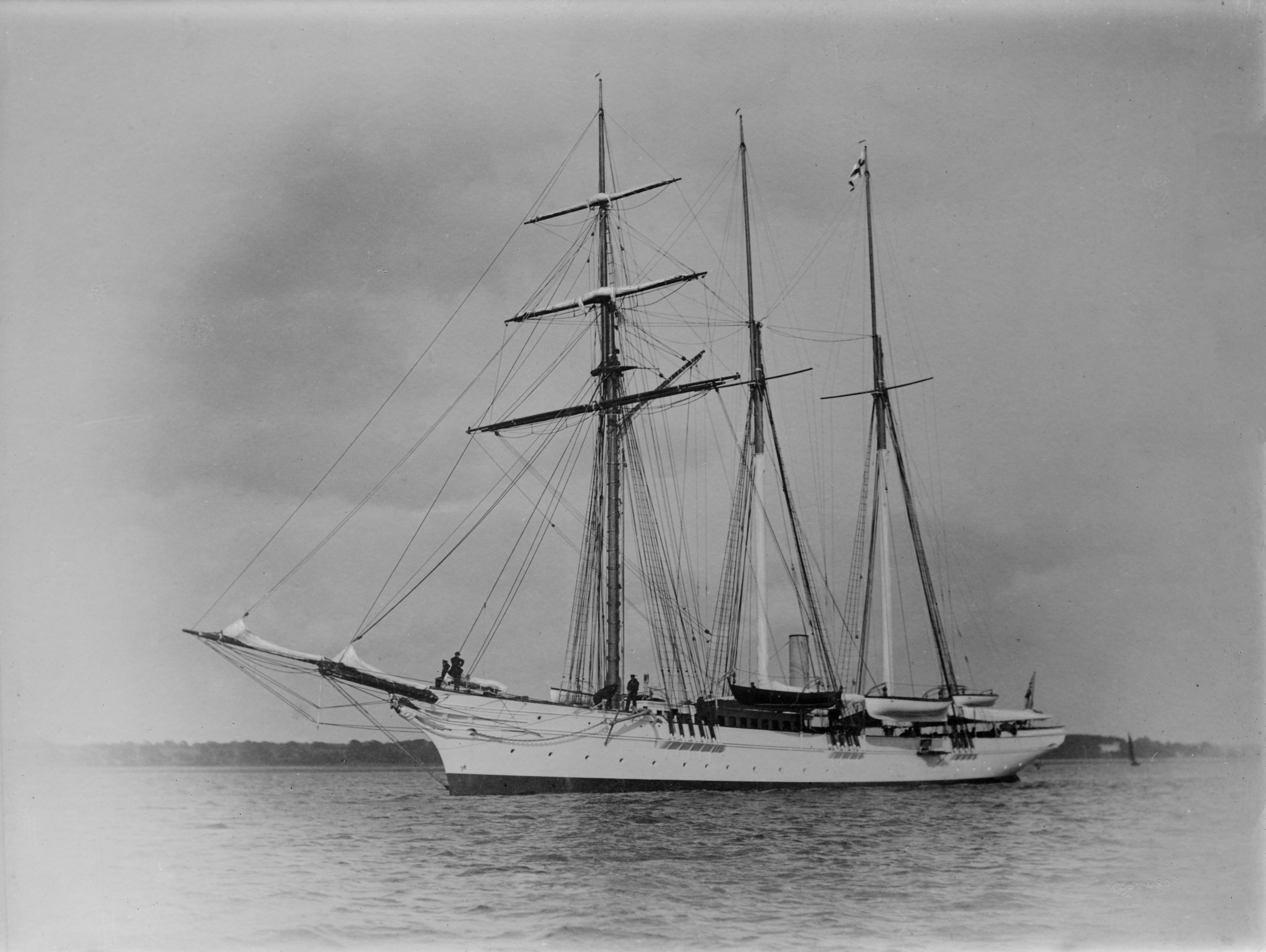
- Sunbeam, date unknown

History

United Kingdom
- Name: Sunbeam, RYS
- Namesake: nickname for CA Brassey
- Owner: 1874: Thomas Brassey; 1919: Devitt and Moore; 1922: Walter Runciman
- Port of registry: London
- Builder: Bowdler, Chaffer & Co, Seacombe
- Yard number: 101
- Launched: 20 January 1874
- Completed: June 1874
- Identification: UK official number 70573; code letters NTGF
- Fate: Scrapped, 1930

General characteristics
- Type: steam yacht
- Tonnage: 334 GRT, 227 NRT
- Length: 159.0 ft (48.5 m)
- Beam: 27.6 ft (8.4 m)
- Depth: 13.9 ft (4.2 m)
- Installed power: 67 NHP
- Propulsion: 1 × compound engine; 1 × screw
- Sail plan: three-masted barquentine
- Speed: 10 knots (19 km/h)

Sunbeam, RYS was a composite-hulled barquentine with an auxiliary steam engine, which was launched in England in 1874. She was a member of the Royal Yacht Squadron. She was the yacht of Thomas Brassey, 1st Earl Brassey until his death in 1918. His wife Anna Brassey wrote several popular books about their voyages aboard her, which were published between 1879 and 1889. After Thomas Brassey's death in 1918, Devitt and Moore acquired her and used her as a training ship. By 1922 the shipping magnate Walter Runciman had acquired her. She was scrapped in 1930.

== Building and registration ==
St Clare Byrne designed the yacht for Thomas Brassey, then the Liberal MP for Hastings. Bowdler, Chaffer & Co of Seacombe built her as yard number 101; launched her in 20 January 1874; and completed her that June. She was named in memory of Constance Alberta Brassey, a daughter of Thomas and Anna Brassey, whose nickname was "Sunbeam", and who had died of scarlet fever in 1873. The yacht's figurehead was a gilded half-length sculpture representing her as a winged putto.

Her frame was iron, and her hull planks were teak. Her length was 159.0 ft (48.5 m), her beam was 27.6 ft (8.4 m), and her depth was 13.9 ft (4.2 m). Her tonnages were 334 GRT, 227 NRT, and 532 Thames Measurement. She had three masts, and was a gaff rigged barquentine, with a sail area of about 9,000 square yards (7,500 m^{2}).

She also had a single screw, driven by a two-cylinder compound engine made by Laird Brothers of Birkenhead. It was rated at 67 NHP, and gave her a speed of 10 knots (19 km/h). Her bunkers had capacity for 80 tons of coal, which was enough for up to 20 days' steaming. However, she was designed primarily for sailing, with the engine as auxiliary power. When she was not in steam, her funnel could be lowered to avoid obstructing her sailing booms, and her propeller feathered to reduce drag.

She was registered at London. Her UK official number was 70573, and her code letters were NTGF.

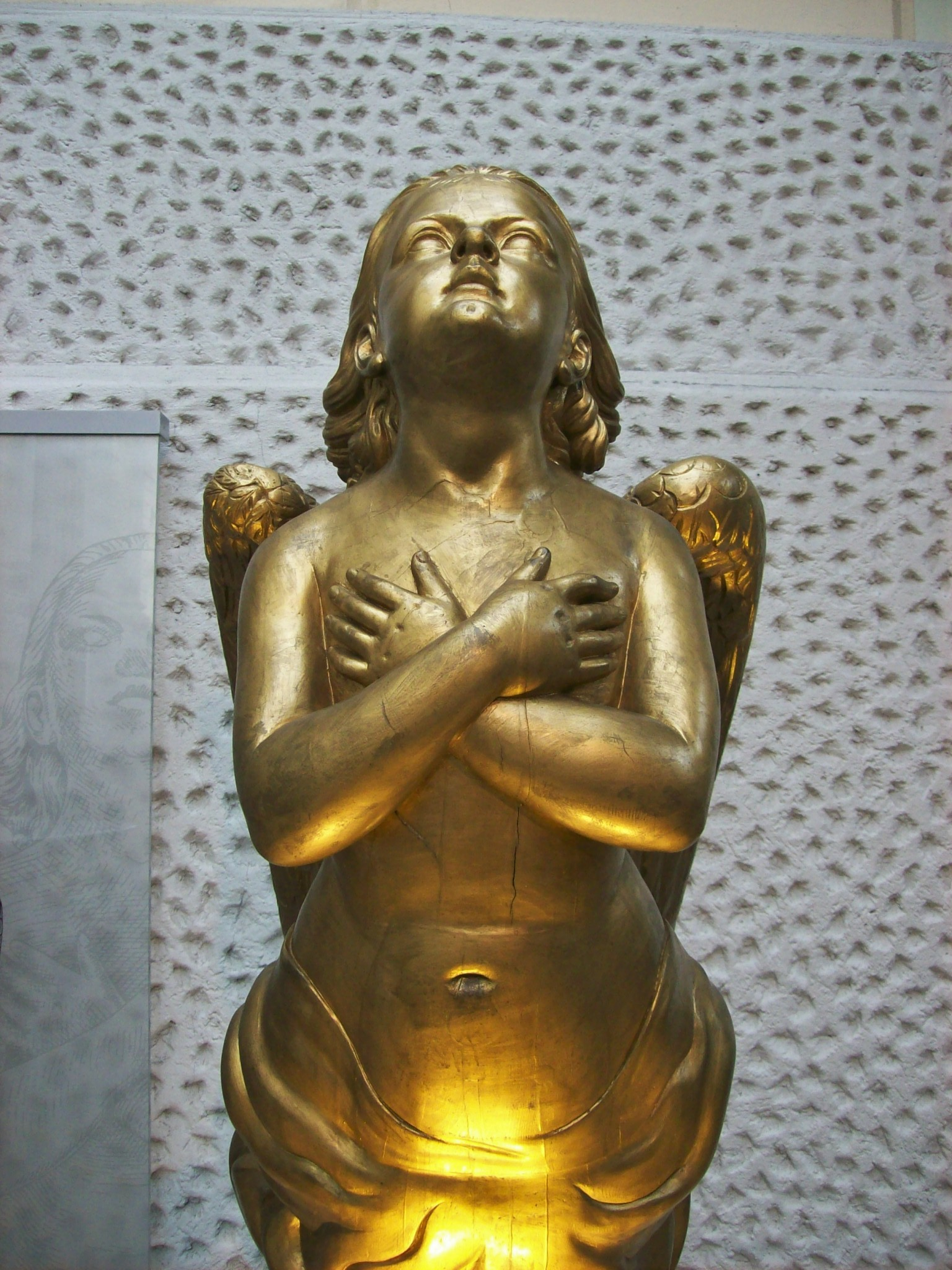
Sunbeam's figurehead, representing Constantine Alberta Brassey

== First cruises ==
In the summer of 1874, Mr and Mrs Brassey sailed Sunbeam to Norway and the Arctic Circle. Then, on 13 September 1874, they left Portsmouth aboard Sunbeam. They sailed her via Tangier, Gibraltar, Tétouan, and Ceuta to the Mediterranean, where they cruised to Sicily, Greece, and Constantinople, toured the Aegean Sea, visited Albania, Sardinia, Naples, Corsica, and Nice, where Mrs Brassey left Sunbeam and returned to England by train. Mr Brassey remained on the yacht, which reached Gravesend on 7 January 1875. Sunbeam had covered about 13,000 miles, including the trip to the Arctic Circle as well as the Mediterranean cruise.

== Around the World ==
On 1 July 1876 Sunbeam left Chatham, Kent carrying 43 people: Mr and Mrs Brassey; their son and three surviving daughters; friends; servants; and crew. She sailed via Madeira, Tenerife, Cape Verde, Rio de Janeiro, and Montevideo to Port of Buenos Aires.

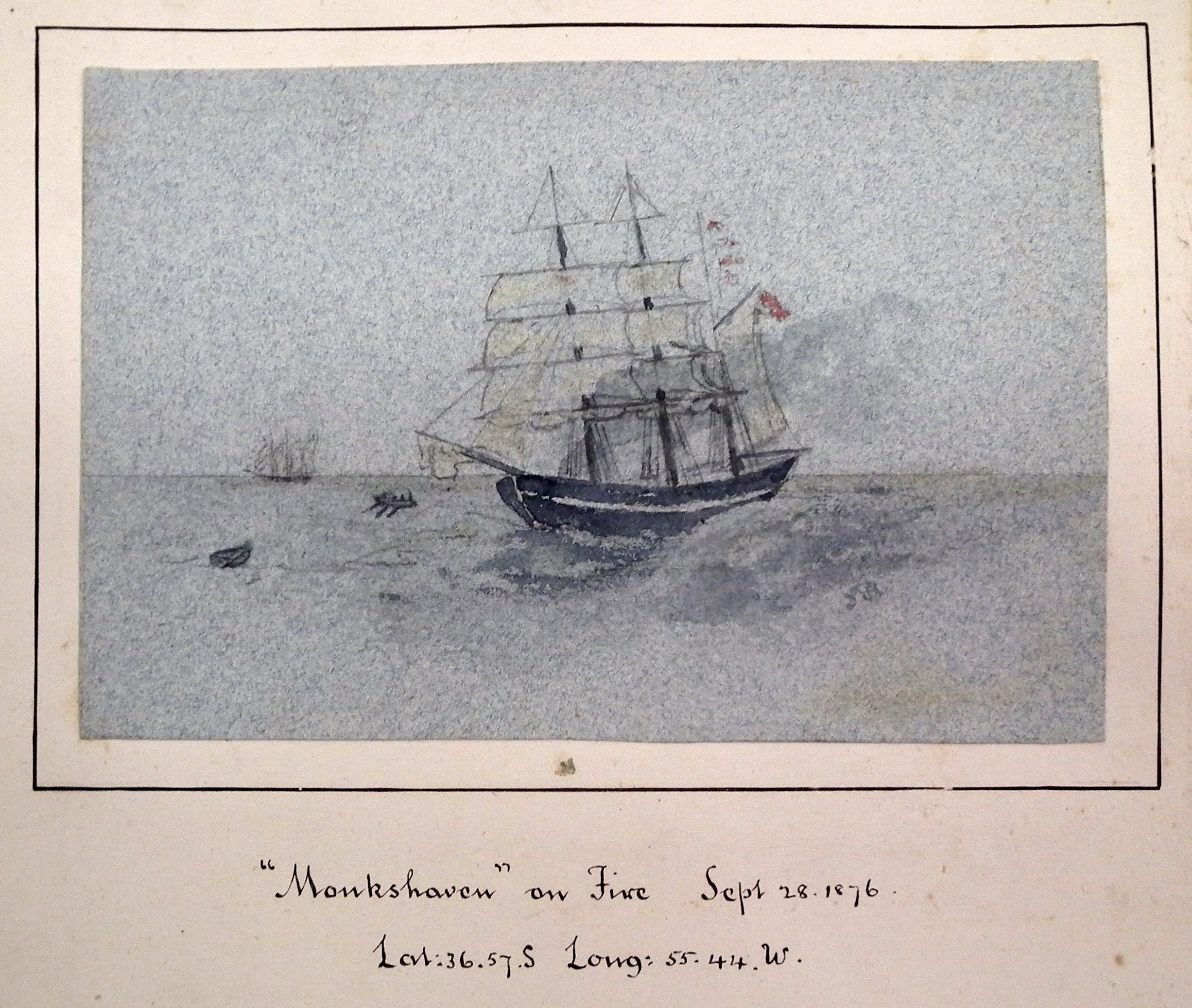
Ink wash of Monkshaven on fire, possibly by Anna Brassey

On 27 September she left Buenos Aires and the Río de la Plata. The next day she sighted the British three-masted barque Monkshaven, which was flying the distress signal of her Red Ensign upside down, and in her rigging was flying signal flags stating "I am on fire". Sunbeam hove to, and sent one of her boats to Monkshaven. The barque was taking smelting coal from Swansea to Valparaíso, but on 24 September her crew had discovered a fire in her cargo, and since the next day they had been living on deck. The barque's crew lowered a dinghy, and with that and Sunbeam's boat, Captain Runciman and his 15 crew abandoned Monkshaven and came aboard Sunbeam. The fire engulfed the barque shortly afterward. On 5 October Sunbeam sighted the Pacific Steam Navigation Company ocean liner Illimani, which was in passage from Chile to England. Her master agreed to take Monkshaven's crew home to Britain, so Sunbeam's gig transferred them between the two ships, apart from the boatswain, who chose to become a member of Sunbeam's crew.

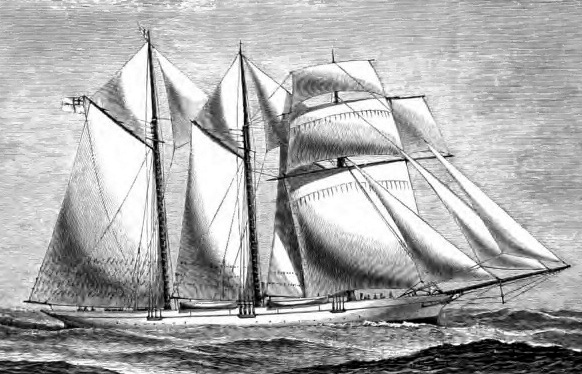
Print of Sunbeam in full sail

Sunbeam continued south to Punta Arenas; through the Strait of Magellan, and then turned north to Lota and Valparaíso. She then crossed the Pacific, calling at Hao, Tahiti, and Hawaii. In the Far East she visited Yokohama, Hong Kong, Canton, Singapore, and Malacca. She crossed the Indian Ocean via Galle, Colombo, and Aden, and passed through the Suez Canal. From Alexandria she continued via Malta, Gibraltar, and Lisbon, and on 26 May 1877 reached Hastings, having sailed some 36,000 miles.

Annie Brassey had previously written, and privately printed, travel stories for her friends and family. After returning to Hastings in May 1877, she wrote up Sunbeam's voyage, and in 1879 Longmans, Green & Co published it as A Voyage in the 'Sunbeam': Our Home on the Ocean for Eleven Months. The book sold well, and was translated into numerous languages.

== Second Meditarranean cruise ==
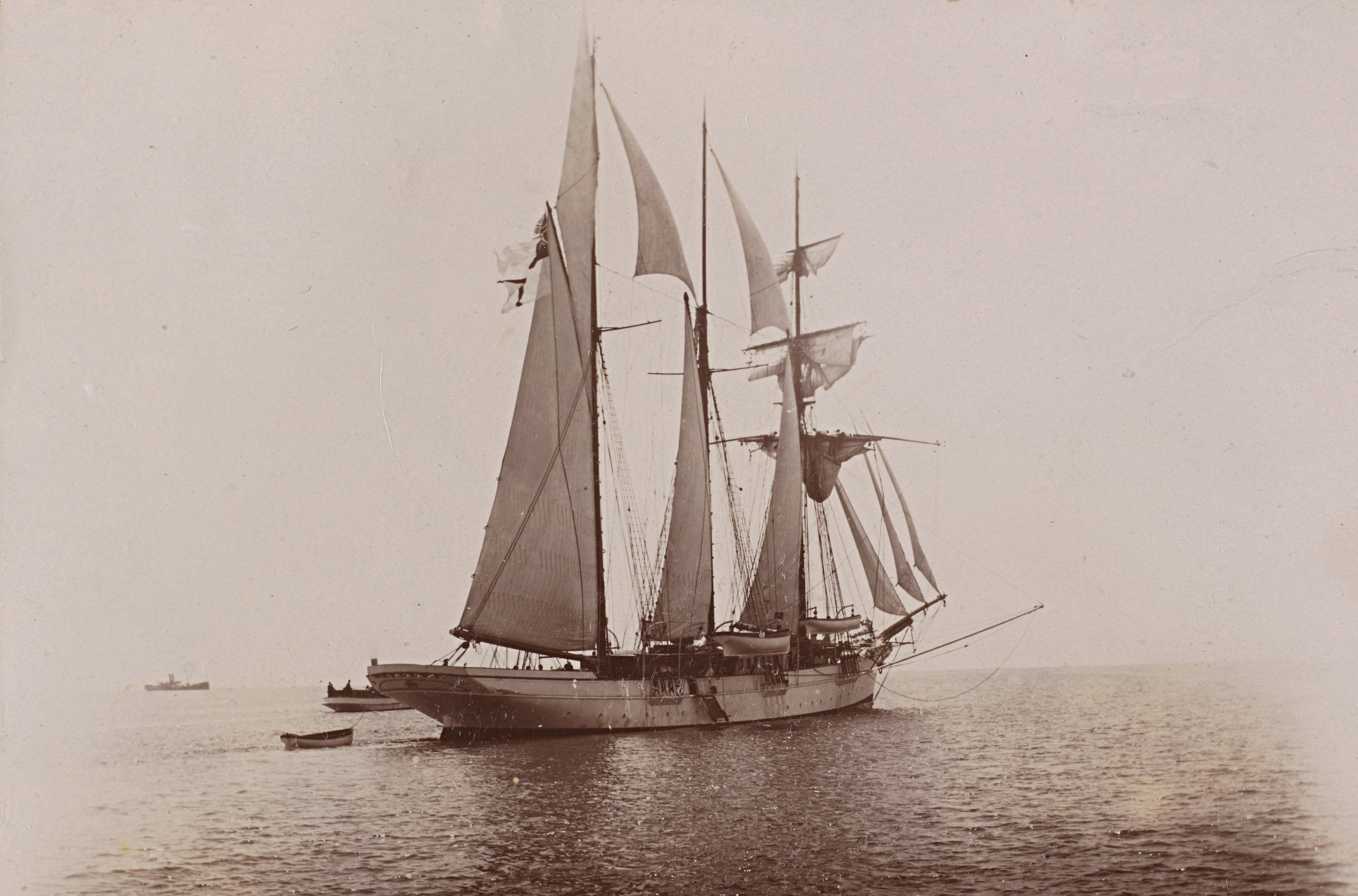
Sunbeam under sail

In the summer of 1878, Sunbeam was slightly damaged when the troop ship Assistance rammed her at low speed in Portsmouth Harbour. Assistance's bow struck Sunbeam's starboard bow, but the yacht remained afloat, and was repaired at the Royal Navy's expense.

On 20 September 1878 the Brasseys sailed the yacht to the Mediterranean again. Sunbeam called at Brest, Vigo, Cadiz, Seville, and Gibraltar, and then visited Oran, Sardinia, Naples, Cyprus, Rhodes, Constantinople, Greece, Malta, to Marseille, where they arrived on 28 December. There the Brasseys left the yacht, and returned to England by train.

Mrs Brassey described Sunbeam's 1874 and 1878 Mediterranean cruises in one volume. Longmans, Green & Co published it in 1880 as Sunshine and Storm in the East, Or, Cruises to Cyprus and Constantinople.

== Further voyages ==
Sunbeam sailed in home waters for many years, including cruises around the Irish and Scottish coasts. On a voyage from Middlesbrough to Portsmouth on 14 October 1881, the barometer dropped to 28.45 inches of mercury, and a hurricane struck Sunbeam. She heeled over so far that her gig and lighter boats were smashed and carried away. Mr Brassey later wrote that this was the only time he had seen her in trouble

In September 1883 Mrs Brassey and the children sailed from Dartmouth to Funchal aboard the Castle Mail Packet Company liner RMS Norham Castle. There they joined Mr Brassey, who was already aboard Sunbeam. By 12 October they had left Madeira together aboard the yacht. They sailed her to the Caribbean, visiting Trinidad, Venezuela, Jamaica, and The Bahamas, and returning via Bermuda and the Azores. They ended their voyage at Plymouth, where they arrived on 30 December 1883, having cruised 14,000 miles on Sunbeam. Longman, Green & Co published Mrs Brassey's account of the voyage in 1884 as In the trades, the tropics, & the roaring forties.

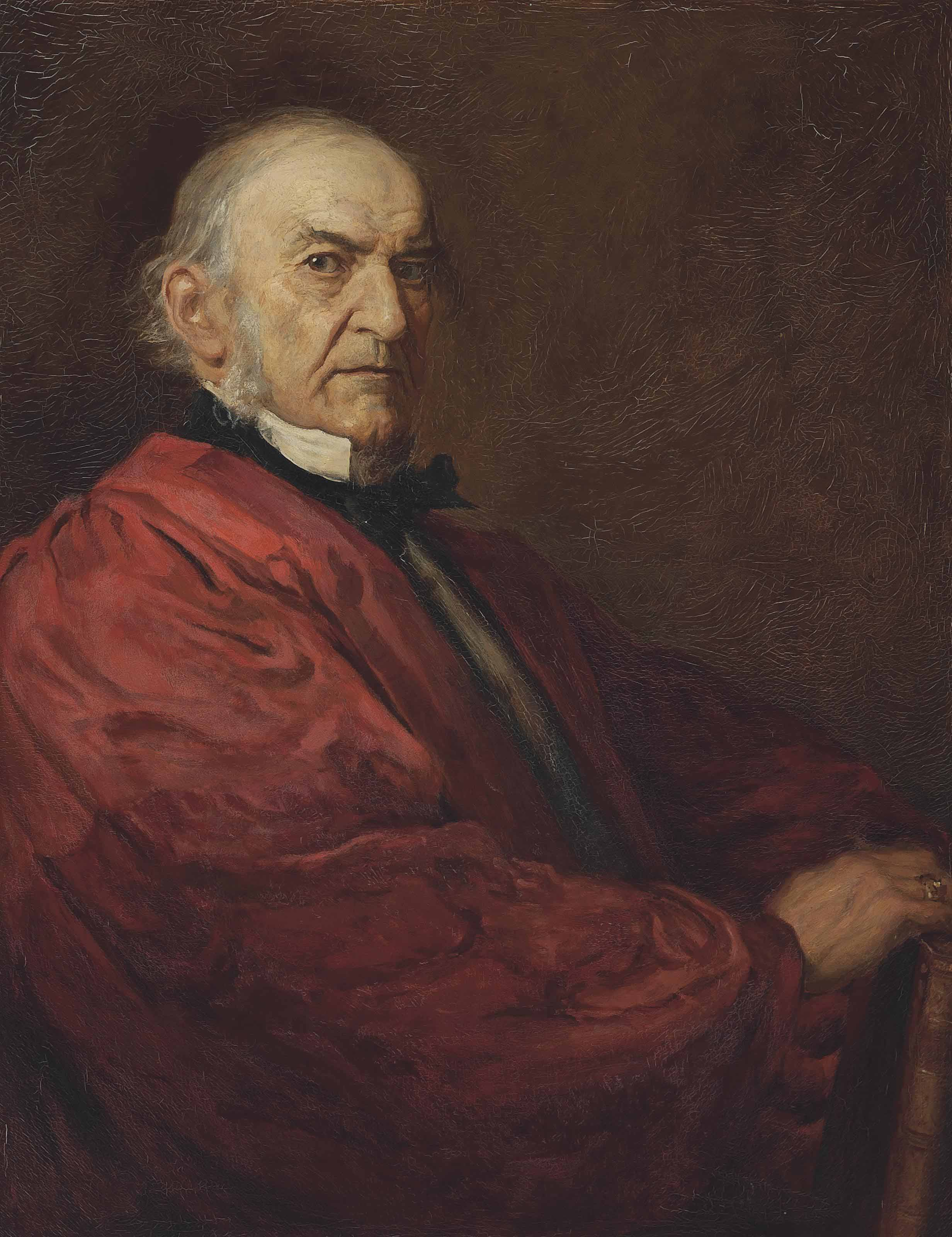
Painting of WE Gladstone by John Millais

In June 1885 WE Gladstone lost office as Prime Minister. Shortly afterward, the Brasseys took him on a three-week cruise to Scandinavia. Mrs Brassey described the voyage in an article for The Contemporary Review.

== To Australia and back ==
In 1886 Thomas Brassey was ennobled as Baron Brassey. Lady Brassey suffered periods of illness, so in 1886 they planned a voyage to Australia in the hope of improving her health. On 18 November Lord Brassey left Southampton aboard Sunbeam. Lady Brassey and their three daughters followed on the P&O liner Thames, via Brindisi and the Suez Canal. The two ships met off Bombay on 3 January 1887. Their son, Thomas, had travelled to India some weeks earlier, and also joined Sunbeam in Bombay.

On 6 January Sunbeam left Bombay. She sailed to Karachi, where the family went ashore to tour British India. The yacht returned to Bombay to await them, making the passage in just 52 hours, entirely under sail. After their tour inland, the family rejoined the yacht at Bombay, where they recruited Frank White, a reporter from the Bombay Gazette, to sail with them as a temporary personal secretary. On 21 or 22 February the Brasseys resumed their voyage aboard Sunbeam'. On 25 February, White inexplicably jumped overboard. The yacht was promptly put about to rescue him, a lookout was posted at the head of the foremast to look for him, and a boat was lowered, but he was never found.

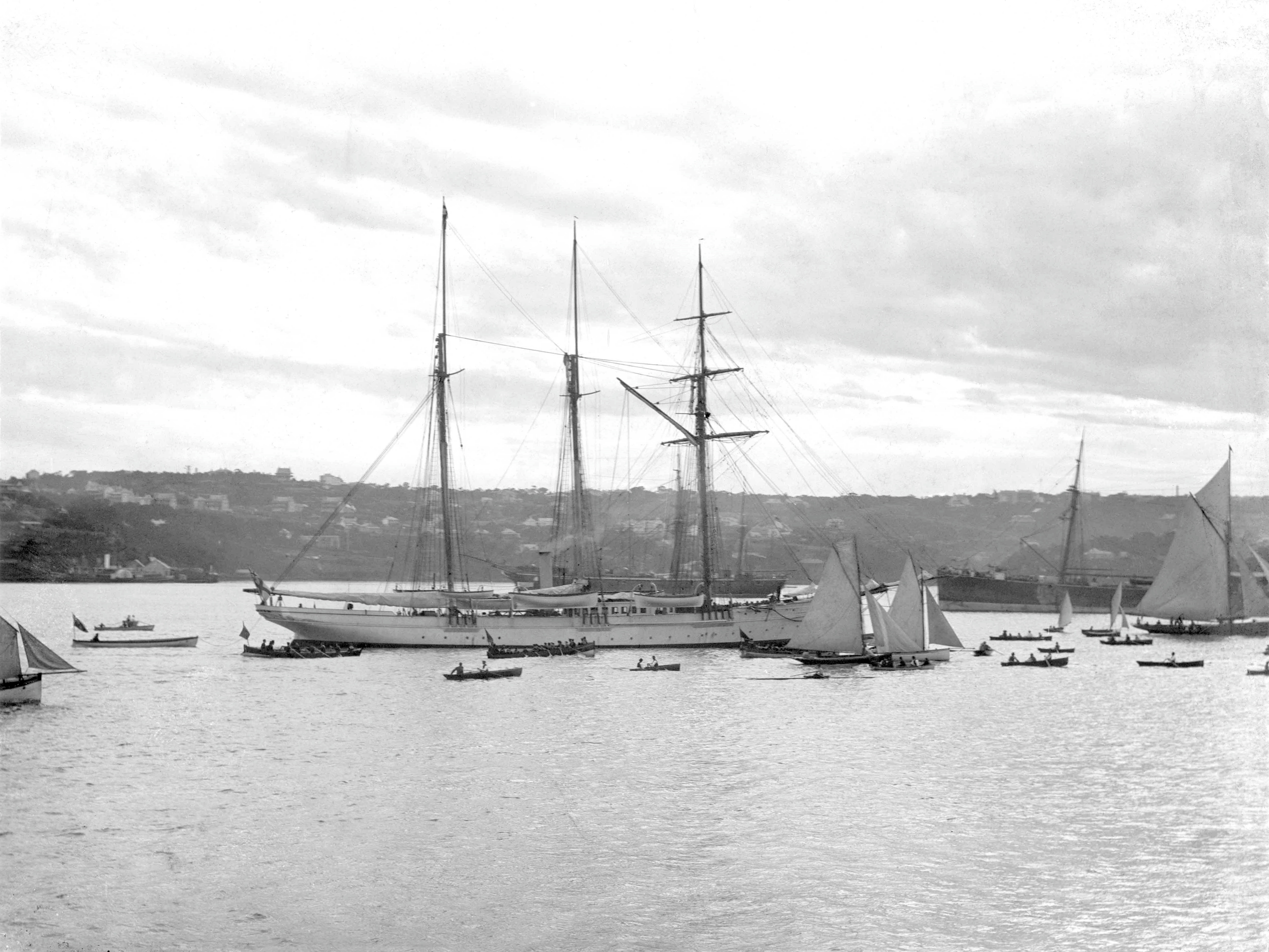
Sunbeam surrounded by boats in Sydney Harbour

The next day Sunbeam reached Goa. From there she sailed via Colombo, Rangoon, Labuan, Elopura, and Celebes, through the Alas Strait and on 9 May reached Albany, Western Australia. She continued via Glenelg, South Australia to Port Adelaide. Lady Brassey and the children travelled by rail from Adelaide via Ballarat to Melbourne, while Lord Brassey sailed there on Sunbeam. The yacht and the family also visited Geelong. Lady Brassey and the children travelled by rail via Seymour, Victoria and Shepparton to Sydney, while Lord Brassey continued on Sunbeam, reaching Watsons Bay on 3 July.

The Brasseys sailed on Sunbeam from Sydney to Newcastle. From there the family travelled by train to Wallangarra, Queensland, where they changed trains at the break of gauge. They continued by train to Brisbane, where Lady Brassey was taken ill for three days. Sunbeam sailed up the coast to Brisbane, and the family went back aboard her on 20 July. From there they sailed south along the coast as far as Cape Byron, and then back to Brisbane. In Brisbane, two ofSunbeam's boiler tubes burst, and their replacement delayed her sailing on 28 July. Sunbeam called at Rockhampton, Bowen, Townsville, Dungeness, Mourilyan, Cooktown, the Piper Islands, Somerset, a few of the Torres Strait Islands, and on 6 September reached Palmerston.

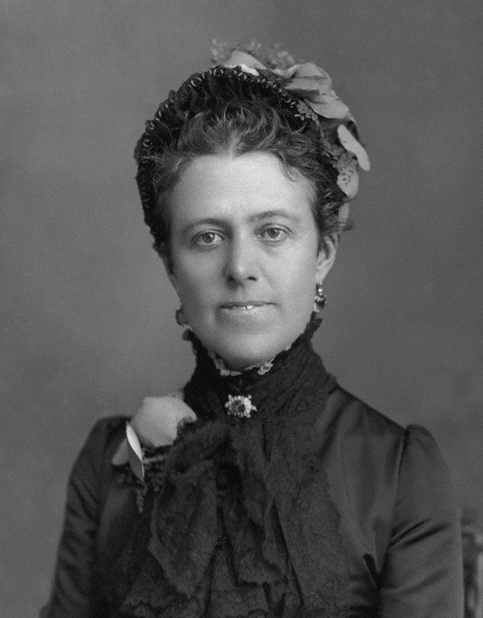
Lady Brassey in 1883

From Palmerston and Port Darwin, Sunbeam headed west into the Indian Ocean. Lady Brassey died on 14 September, and was buried at sea. Sunbeam reached Mauritius on 29 September. She returned home via Algoa Bay, Port Elizabeth, Cape Town, Saint Helena, Ascension Island, Sierra Leone, Cape Verde, and the Azores, reaching Portsmouth on 14 December. Lady Brassey had kept a diary of the voyage as far as the Torres Straits islands. Lord Brassey added an account of the voyage from the Torres Straits to Portsmouth as an appendix, and Longmans, Green & Co published the account in 1889 as The Last Voyage, to India and Australia, in the 'Sunbeam'.

== Later years with Brassey ==
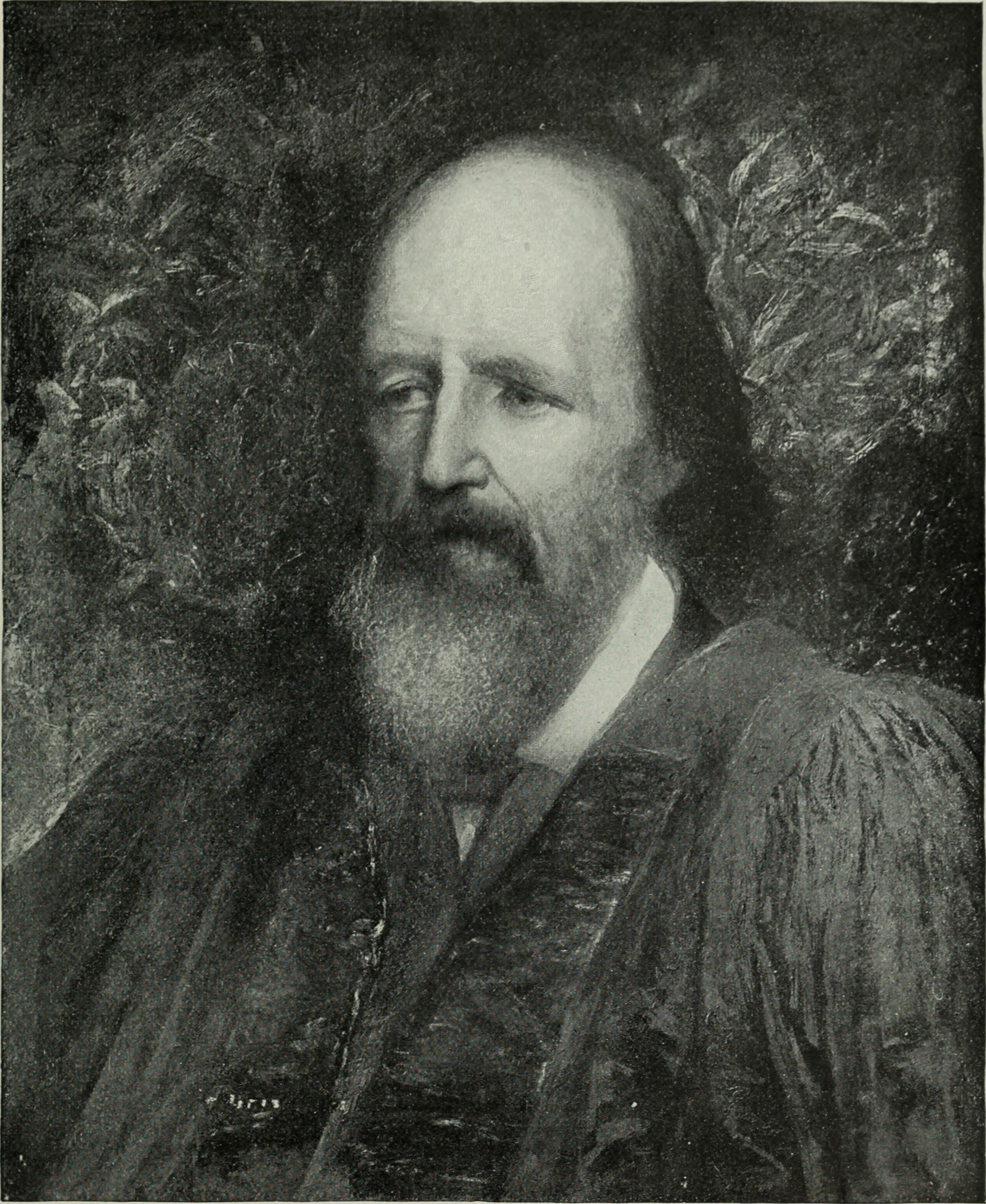
Alfred, Lord Tennyson

Alfred, Lord Tennyson was also a guest on Sunbeam in 1889 for a cruise in home waters. In 1890 Lord Brassey remarried, and in 1895 he was made Governor of Victoria. Brassey, who had a Master's certificate, captained Sunbeam from England via Cape Horn to Melbourne. While in Australia, Sunbeam visited Sydney, Adelaide, Brisbane, Tasmania, and, in 1896–97, New Zealand. When Brassey's term of office ended in 1900, he sailed Sunbeam home, again via Cape Horn.

In 1903, Lord Brassey sailed Sunbeam to Quebec in 1903 for a conference. In 1905 he entered her in a transatlantic race for the Kaiser's Cup, coming come sixth in a field of ten. In 1907 Brassey gave the New York Yacht Club a model of Sunbeam. It is still displayed in the club's library.

In 1910 the amateur golfer and golf-writer Horace Hutchinson took Sunbeam to Iceland and Canada. Longmans, Green and Co published his account of the voyage in 1911 as A Saga of the 'Sunbeam'. In 1913–14 Lord Brassey took Sunbeam to India, in what he described as the last cruise in his personal service.

When the First World War began, Sunbeam did Red Cross work between Britain and France. In 1915 she was converted into a hospital ship, and Brassey sailed her to Moudros Bay to treat troops wounded in the Gallipoli campaign. She was of limited value, so Brassey transferred Sunbeam to the Indian government for the remainder of the war. At that time, he estimated that she had travelled 500,000 miles since she was launched. In 1917 John Murray published Brassey's account of owning and sailing her as "Sunbeam" R.Y.S. Voyages & Experiences in Many Waters (Naval Reserves and Other Matters).

Walter Runciman

== Changes of ownership ==
In 1918 Lord Brassey died, and Henry Leonard Brassey inherited her. In 1919 Devitt and Moore acquired the yacht for use as a training ship. In 1922 the shipping magnate Walter Runciman had acquired her, and by 1923 she was registered as a yacht once more. Thos. W. Ward bought her in 1929, and scrapped her at Morecambe Bay in June 1930. Her figurehead is preserved in the National Maritime Museum, Greenwich. Runciman perpetuated her name with a new yacht, Sunbeam II, which William Denny and Brothers launched in June 1929, and completed that September.

== Bibliography ==
- Brassey, Anna (1879). A Voyage in the 'Sunbeam': Our Home on the Ocean for Eleven Months. London: Longmans, Green & Co – via Google Books.
- Brassey, Anna (1880). Sunshine and Storm in the East, Or, Cruises to Cyprus and Constantinople. London: Longmans, Green & Co – via Google Books.
- Brassey, Anna (1884). In the trades, the tropics, & the roaring forties. London: Longmans, Green & Co – via Google Books.
- Brassey, Anna (1889). The Last Voyage, to India and Australia, in the 'Sunbeam'. Longmans, Green & Co – via Google Books.
- Brassey, Thomas (1917). "Sunbeam" R.Y.S. Voyages & Experiences in Many Waters (Naval Reserves and Other Matters). London: John Murray.
- Hutchinson, Horace (1911). A Saga of the 'Sunbeam'. London: Longmans, Green & Co.
- Register of Yachts. London: Lloyd's Register of Shipping. 1923 – via Internet Archive.
- Mercantile Navy List. London. 1875 – via Crew List Index Project.
- Yacht Register. London: Lloyd's Register of Shipping. 1878 – via Internet Archive.
- Yacht Register. London: Lloyd's Register of Shipping. 1882 – via Internet Archive.
- Yacht Register. London: Lloyd's Register of Shipping. 1901 – via Internet Archive.
