= 1914 The Hartlepools by-election =

UK Parliamentary by-election

Furness

The 1914 The Hartlepools by-election was held on 22 September 1914. The by-election was held due to the death of the incumbent Liberal MP, Sir Stephen Furness. It was won by the 67-year old Liberal candidate Sir Walter Runciman who was unopposed due to a War-time electoral pact.

== Result ==
Runciman

1914 The Hartlepools by-election
Party	Candidate	Votes	%	±%
Liberal	Walter Runciman	Unopposed	N/A	N/A
Liberal hold				
