= Ted Leadbitter =

British politician

Edward Leadbitter

Member of Parliament
- In office 15 October 1964 – 16 March 1992
- Preceded by: John Kerans
- Succeeded by: Peter Mandelson
- Constituency: The Hartlepools (1964–1974); Hartlepool (1974–1992)

Personal details
- Born: 18 June 1919 Easington, County Durham, England
- Died: 23 December 1996 (aged 77) Stockton-on-Tees, County Durham, England
- Party: Labour
- Spouse: Irene Mellin (m. 1940)
- Children: 2
- Occupation: Councillor
- Profession: Teacher

Edward Leadbitter (18 June 1919 – 23 December 1996) was a British politician. Leadbitter was a teacher and served as a councillor on West Hartlepool Borough Council.

== Member of Parliament ==
Leadbitter was member of parliament for the Hartlepools and then the renamed Hartlepool from 1964 until he retired in March 1992. His successor was Peter Mandelson.

in 1979, Leadbitter played a role in publicly exposing Anthony Blunt as a spy for the Soviet Union. On Thursday 15 November 1979, Prime Minister Margaret Thatcher revealed Blunt's wartime role in the House of Commons in reply to written parliamentary questions put to her by Leadbitter and Dennis Skinner, MP for Bolsover:

Mr. Leadbitter and Mr. Skinner: Asked the Prime Minister if she will make a statement on recent evidence concerning the actions of an individual, whose name has been supplied to her, in relation to the security of the United Kingdom.

The Prime Minister: "The name which the hon. Member for Hartlepool (Mr. Leadbitter) has given me is that of Sir Anthony Blunt."

Leadbitter was also known for his argument against the 1991 judgment of the Court of Appeal and House of Lords in R v R that criminalised marital rape for the first time. He claimed that married women would now falsely allege rape if a couple had a row.

Shortly before he quit Parliament, he angered Neil Kinnock by buying shares in British Telecom and British Gas.

He died on 23 December 1996, in the intensive care unit at North Tees Hospital, where he was being treated after a road accident.

Parliament of the United Kingdom
Preceded by John Kerans	Member of Parliament for The Hartlepools; 1964–Feb. 1974	constituency abolished
New constituency	Member of Parliament for Hartlepool; Feb. 1974–1992	Succeeded by Peter Mandelson
