= 1875 Hartlepool by-election =

UK Parliamentary by-election

The Hartlepools by-election of 1875 was fought on 29 July 1875. The by-election was fought due to the resignation of the incumbent Liberal MP, Thomas Richardson. It was won by the Liberal candidate Lowthian Bell.
