= John Kerans =

British politician (1915–1985)

Commander John Kerans DSO
- Kerans in 1969 by Godfrey Argent

Member of Parliament for The Hartlepools
- In office 8 October 1959 – 25 September 1964
- Preceded by: D. T. Jones
- Succeeded by: Ted Leadbitter

Personal details
- Born: John Simon Kerans; 30 June 1915 Parsonstown (Birr), County Offaly, Ireland
- Died: 11 September 1985 (aged 70) Oxted, Surrey, England
- Resting place: St Peter Churchyard, Tandridge, Surrey
- Party: Conservative
- Spouse: Stephanie Campbell Shires (m. 1946)
- Children: 2
- Education: Royal Naval College, Dartmouth

Military service
- Allegiance: United Kingdom
- Branch/service: Royal Navy
- Rank: Commander
- Unit: Naval Intelligence, Far East; HMS Icarus (D03); Naval Intelligence, Hong Kong; Royal Malaysia Police
- Commands: Assistant naval attaché, Nanking; HMS Amethyst; Naval Intelligence, London; Naval attaché, Bangkok
- Battles/wars: World War II; Amethyst Incident
- Awards: Distinguished Service Order

Commander John Simon Kerans DSO (30 June 1915 – 12 September 1985) was an officer in the Royal Navy and later a Conservative Party politician. He is also the author of the 1964 book The World's Greatest Sea Adventures, published by Odhams Books Ltd.

== Yangtze Incident ==
Lieutenant-Commander Kerans was Assistant British Naval Attaché in then Nanking, China in 1949, when HMS Amethyst came under fire on the Yangtze River during the final stages of the Chinese Civil War, killing her captain and 16 others. Kerans was dispatched to find out more about the attack and fates of the wounded who had reportedly escaped ashore. Vice-Admiral Madden subsequently appointed Kerans command of the ship. The ship was detained for ten weeks during negotiations for its release, until Kerans led a night-time escape. Kerans was awarded the Distinguished Service Order. The Amethyst incident was later the subject of a film entitled Yangtse Incident: The Story of HMS Amethyst (1957), in which Kerans was portrayed by the British actor Richard Todd.

== Politics ==
At the 1959 general election he was elected as Conservative Member of Parliament for The Hartlepools. He served only one term in the House of Commons, and did not contest the 1964 general election. He advocated the representation of Communist China in the United Nations.

Kerans was the last Conservative to serve as MP for the constituency (now called Hartlepool) until Jill Mortimer was elected following the 2021 Hartlepool by-election.

== Grave ==
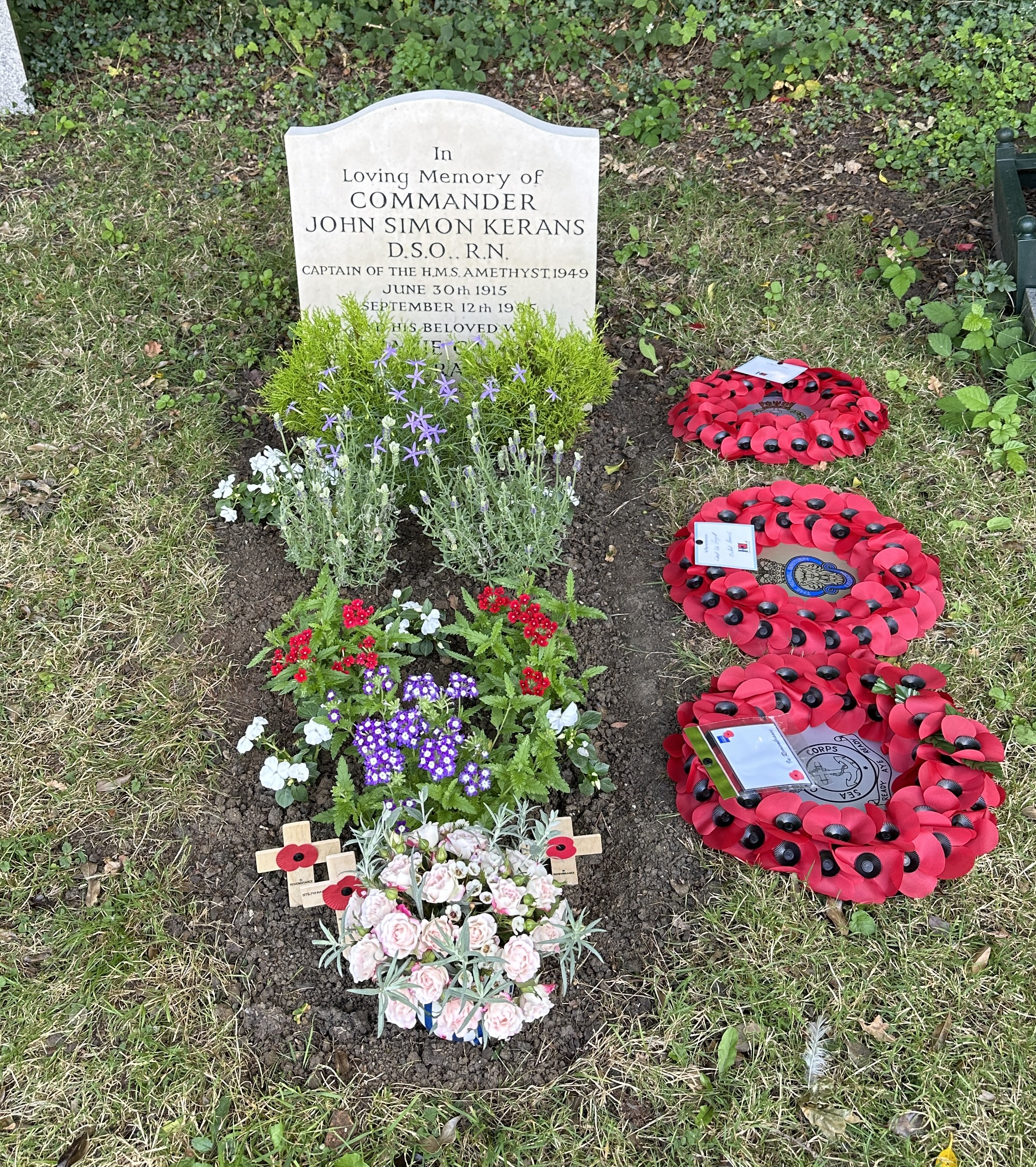
The gravestone of Commander John Kerans DSO at St Peter's Churchyard, Tandridge

His remains are interred in the churchyard of St Peters, Tandridge and the grave can be found in the eastern side near the boundary wall. The photo left was on the 75th anniversary memorial service 2024 with wreaths laid by The Royal Naval Association Reigate, The Oxted Branch Royal British Legion and Reigate Sea Cadets. A reception was held afterwards at the Oxted Branch of the Royal British Legion. This commemoration led by the Oxted Branch Chairman Rob Cogan, will be an annual event.

Parliament of the United Kingdom
Preceded by D. T. Jones	Member of Parliament for The Hartlepools; 1959–1964	Succeeded by Ted Leadbitter
