= 1910 The Hartlepools by-election =

UK parliamentary by-election

← 1910	20 June 1910	1910 →

Candidate	Furness	Gritten
Party	Liberal	Conservative
Popular vote	6,017	5,969
Percentage	50.2%	49.8%
MP before election
Christopher Furness
Liberal
Subsequent MP
Stephen Furness
Liberal

The Hartlepools by-election of 1910 was a Parliamentary by-election held on 20 June 1910. The constituency returned one Member of Parliament (MP) to the House of Commons of the United Kingdom, elected by the first past the post voting system.

== Vacancy ==
Sir Christopher Furness had been Liberal MP for the seat of The Hartlepools since the 1900 general election. His re-election in January 1910 was declared void after an electoral petition causing the need for the by-election. The Petitioners (Joseph Foster Wilson and John Roger Butterwick) alleged illegal practices in illegal payments to certain persons, for marks of distinction and for conveyance of voters to the poll. It was also alleged that the maximum campaign expenditure allowed had been exceeded and that a false return of expenses had been made by the Butler, Furness's Election Agent. Butler, who was the private secretary of Furness, charged nothing for his services and clerks in the employ of Furness's firm rendered clerical assistance without payment. The return of Election expenses made was only a few shillings below the maximum allowed. Mr Justice Phillimore commented "If it could be said that Butler's appointment was wholly political, or that he was retained partly as a private secretary and also for the political work of Sir Christopher, if he was an extra Agent during the Election, then it would be necessary to return a proportionate part of the salary as being an expense of the Election. It was said that the real reason why he was not paid anything was the fact that Sir Christopher's expenses came within a few shillings of the maximum, but there was no evidence of any contract to the effect that Sir Christopher Furness would pay the Election Agent's fee if he could do so without exceeding the maximum of expense." As to the clerks, Mr. Justice Phillimore said : — " The evidence with regard to the employment on the Election day of clerks in the service of Furness, Withy & Co. was incomplete. He was not able to say, on the evidence, whether they ought to consider Furness, Withy & Co., Ltd., as a separate person from Sir Christopher, under another name.

== Electoral history ==
The seat had been won by the Liberal Party at every election since 1874, apart from 1886 and 1895 when a former Liberal standing as a Liberal Unionist won. Furness easily held the seat at the last election;

General election January 1910: Hartlepool
Party	Candidate	Votes	%	±%
Liberal	Christopher Furness	6,531	53.2	N/A
Conservative	William George Howard Gritten	5,754	46.8	New
Majority		777	6.4	N/A
Turnout		12,285	89.6	N/A
Liberal hold		Swing	-2.5	

== Candidates ==
- The local Liberal Association selected 38-year-old Stephen Furness to defend the seat. He was the nephew of the unseated MP. Furness was educated at Ashville College, Harrogate. He was a member of the prominent ship-owning family from West Hartlepool. He was an elected to West Hartlepool Town Council in 1897 and Durham County Council in 1898.
- The Conservatives retained 40-year-old Howard Gritten as their candidate. Gritten was born in London and educated at Brasenose College, Oxford, where he won the Donald E. Bridgman Essay Prize, and graduated with honours in Literae Humaniores. He was a barrister.

== Campaign ==
Polling Day was fixed for the 20 June 1910.

== Result ==
Furness held the seat with a reduced majority;

The Hartlepools by-election, 1910: Hartlepool
Party	Candidate	Votes	%	±%
Liberal	Stephen Furness	6,159	50.7	−2.5
Conservative	William George Howard Gritten	5,993	49.3	+2.5
Majority		166	1.4	−5.0
Turnout		12,152	88.6	−1.0
Liberal hold		Swing	-2.5	

== Aftermath ==
Furness held the seat at the following general election six months later with a further reduced majority;

General election December 1910: Hartlepool
Party	Candidate	Votes	%	±%
Liberal	Stephen Furness	6,017	50.2	−0.5
Conservative	William George Howard Gritten	5,969	49.8	+0.5
Majority		48	0.4	−1.0
Turnout		11,986	87.4	−1.2
Liberal hold		Swing	-0.5	
