= Furness baronets =

Baronetcy in the Baronetage of the United Kingdom

Escutcheon of the Furness baronets of Tunstall Grange

The Furness Baronetcy, of Tunstall Grange in the borough of West Hartlepool in the County of Durham, is a title in the Baronetage of the United Kingdom. It was created on 18 June 1913 for Stephen Furness. He was Chairman of Furness, Withy and Co, and also represented Hartlepool in the House of Commons as a Liberal. The third Baronet was an artist (as Robin Furness).

Christopher Furness, 1st Baron Furness, was the uncle of the first Baronet.

== Furness baronets, of Tunstall Grange (1913) ==
- Sir Stephen Wilson Furness, 1st Baronet (1872–1914)
- Sir Christopher Furness, 2nd Baronet (1900–1974)
- Sir Stephen Robert Furness, 3rd Baronet (1933–2024)
- Sir Michael Fitzroy Roberts Furness, 4th Baronet (born 1962)

The heir apparent is the present holder's son Harvey Fitzroy Stephen Furness (born 1999).

== Notes ==
Baronetage of the United Kingdom
Preceded by Gwynne-Evans baronets	Furness baronets of Tunstall Grange; 18 June 1913	Succeeded by Lane baronets
