= Walter Runciman, 1st Baron Runciman =

British shipping magnate (1847–1937)

The Right Honourable The Lord Runciman
- Sir Walter Runciman

Member of Parliament for The Hartlepools
- In office 1914–1918
- Preceded by: Sir Stephen Furness, Bt
- Succeeded by: W. G. Howard Gritten

Personal details
- Born: 6 July 1847 Dunbar, Scotland
- Died: 13 August 1937 (aged 90)
- Party: Liberal
- Relatives: Walter Runciman (son); Steven Runciman (grandson)
- Known for: Anchor Line

Walter Runciman, 1st Baron Runciman (6 July 1847 – 13 August 1937), was an English and Scottish shipping magnate. He was born in the Scottish town of Dunbar.

Runciman was the fourth son of Walter Runciman, master of a schooner and later a member of the coastguard, and Jane, oldest daughter of John Finlay, shipowner, also of Dunbar. The family moved to the coastguard station at Cresswell, Northumberland, because his father was appointed a position there. After attending a church school, the younger Walter ran away from home to work at sea in 1859.

This explains why he was referred to by his grandson Steven as "a Geordie of Scots descent who ran away to sea at 11, was a master mariner by 21 and founded a shipping line", and, usefully for historians of a related area, Runciman wrote several books based on his years at sea. He also served briefly as a Liberal Member of Parliament.

In 1889, Runciman founded the South Shields Shipping Company, based in the port of South Shields, on the south bank at the mouth of the River Tyne, which was then part of County Durham but now in Tyne and Wear. Walter Runciman was Managing Director and Secretary, and John Elliott was the chairman. In 1892 the company offices moved up the River Tyne to the city-port of Newcastle. In April 1897 the company changed its name to Moor Line Ltd. Runciman and his son, who had carried on business as partners in Runciman and Co, were appointed managing directors of Moor Line. Elliott died in 1898 and the elder Runciman held the position of chairman until his death in 1937.

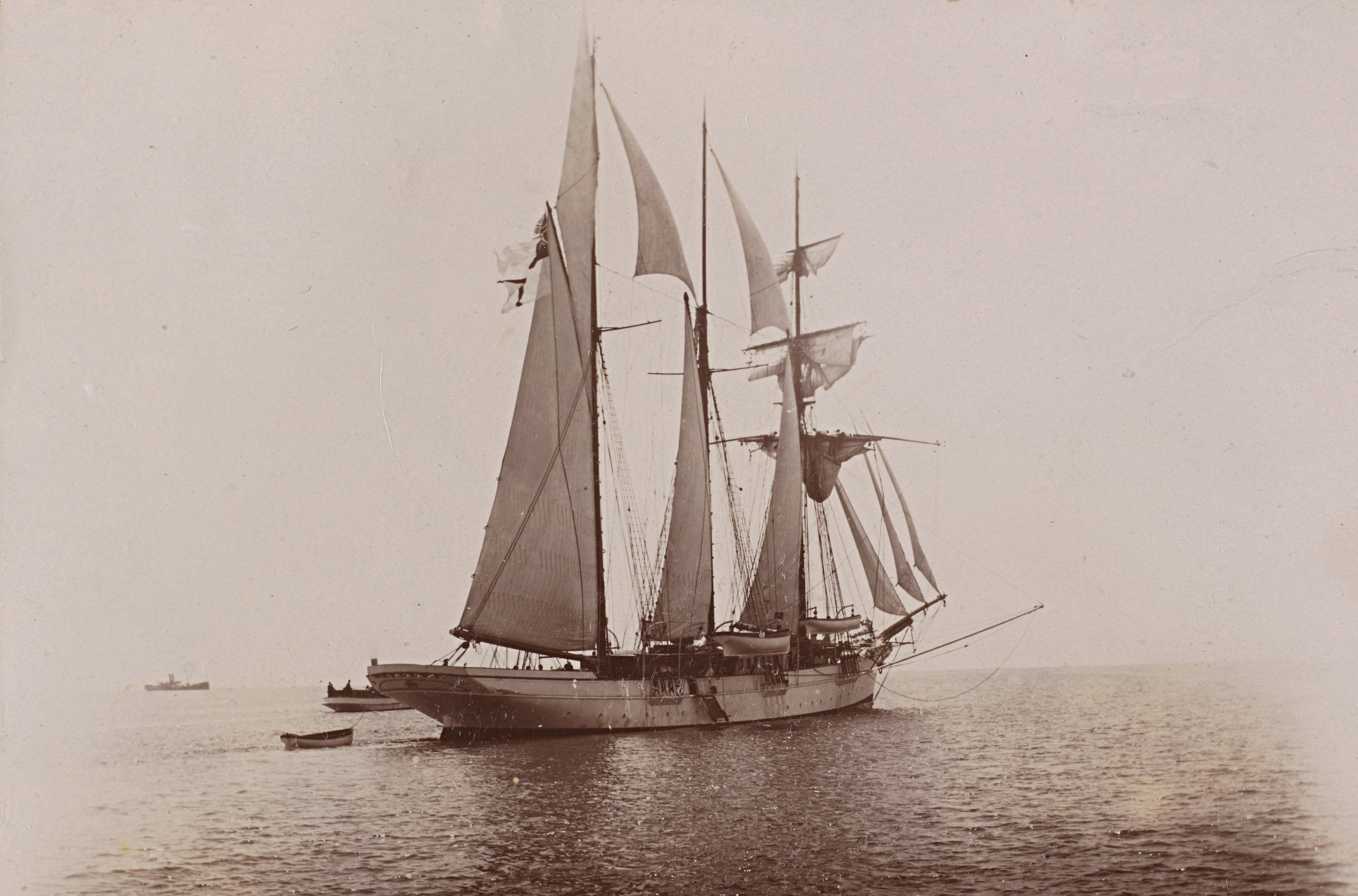
Sunbeam

In 1922 Runciman acquired a yacht, Sunbeam, that had been built in 1874 for Thomas Brassey. In 1929 he sold her for scrap, and replaced her with a new yacht, Sunbeam II, which he ordered from William Denny and Brothers.

Runciman was made a baronet in 1906, and was Liberal MP for The Hartlepools from 1914 to 1918. In 1910 he wrote "The Tragedy of St. Helena", an account of Napoleon Bonaparte's exile and death. In 1933, he was raised to the peerage as Baron Runciman of Shoreston. Four years later his son, the long-serving MP Walter Runciman (1870–1949), followed him into the House of Lords with the title Viscount Runciman of Doxford.

A large inheritance bestowed to his grandson Steven Runciman, enabled him to become an independent scholar who travelled widely and was a leading scholar of the Crusades.

Parliament of the United Kingdom
Preceded by Sir Stephen Furness, Bt	Member of Parliament for The Hartlepools; 1914–1918	Succeeded by W. G. Howard Gritten
Peerage of the United Kingdom
New creation	Baron Runciman; 1933–1937	Succeeded by Walter Runciman
Baronetage of the United Kingdom
New creation	Baronet of Doxford; 1906–1937	Succeeded by Walter Runciman
