= Thomas Richardson (Hartlepool MP, born 1846) =

English Liberal Unionist politician

Richardson in 1895.

Sir Thomas Richardson (28 December 1846 – 22 May 1906) was an English Liberal Unionist politician.

Richardson stood unsuccessfully for Parliament in The Hartlepools at the 1892 general election, losing by a narrow margin of 76 votes (less than 1% of the total) to the sitting Liberal Party member, Christopher Furness. He won the seat at the 1895 general election, with a majority of 81 votes, but at the next general election, in October 1900, Furness retook the seat with a large majority. Richardson did not stand again.

Parliament of the United Kingdom
Preceded by Christopher Furness	Member of Parliament for The Hartlepools; 1895 – 1900	Succeeded by Christopher Furness
