= Reveille (newspaper) =

British weekly tabloid newspaper

- Front cover of the 25 November 1977 edition
- Type: Weekly newspaper
- Format: Tabloid
- Founder: Reg Hipwell
- Publisher: IPC Newspapers
- Launched: 25 May 1940; 85 years ago
- Ceased publication: 17 August 1979; 46 years ago
- Relaunched: March 1973
- City: London
- Country: United Kingdom
- OCLC number: 22099865

Reveille was a popular British weekly tabloid newspaper, founded by Reg Hipwell, during the Second World War and the post-war years.

Launched on 25 May 1940, it was originally the official newspaper of the Ex-Services' Allied Association. It was bought by the Mirror Group in 1947, after which it was printed and published by IPC Newspapers Ltd.

In the 1950s it increased its light-entertainment pages and would often run features on the Royalty.

During the 1960s and 1970s it became known as Reveille Magazine and would publish large double-page pop posters and also feature glamour models.

Author Rosemary Timperley wrote a great many articles for Reveille under her own name and pseudonyms. The crime fiction writer Michael Gilbert published a number of short stories in Reveille, some of them featuring his series character Inspector Petrella.

In March 1973 it was renamed New Reveille, the title being reverted to Reveille in March 1975. By the end of 1975 Reveille had shrunk from its previous 40 page size and had dropped the short story feature, becoming more concerned with television, films, and celebrities.

Its last issue appeared on 17 August 1979 and in September 1979 it merged with Titbits magazine, which branded itself as Titbits incorporating Reveille until 1981 when it reverted to its previous name.

The 19 February 1954 issue featured Marilyn Monroe. In 1957, John Lennon bought one of his first guitars after seeing it advertised in Reveille magazine.

A 1959 Reveille front page, headlined "Hay there!", with a woman in hay, filmed full screen on a London newsstand in the autumn of 1958 by Robert Vas, a Hungarian refugee and film director in the making, for Refuge England, at 22'21 of 25'15, part of Free Cinema 6, 'The Last Free Cinema', which premiered at the National Film Theatre from 18—22 March 1959. In 1963, the paper featured in the film Doctor in Distress when actor Harry Landis is seen reading a copy in a greasy spoon cafe, including the headline "How I Ran Away to Fame by Frank Ifield".
