= D. T. Jones =

David Thomas Jones (17 October 1899 – 4 April 1963), also known as Dai Jones, was a British Labour Party politician.

== Career ==
Jones was elected as Member of Parliament for The Hartlepools at the 1945 general election. He held the seat until his defeat by only 182 votes at the 1959 general election.

== Personal life ==
Jones left school at 12 after passing his Labour examination. At 14, he began working as a railway signalman. Jones married Annie Pugh in 1920. They had four children, two of which died in infancy. In addition to his political career, he was a member of the Pontypridd urban district council and was an active member of the National Union of Railwaymen.

Parliament of the United Kingdom
Preceded by Thomas George Greenwell	Member of Parliament for The Hartlepools; 1945–1959	Succeeded by Cmdr John Kerans
