= Christopher Furness, 1st Baron Furness =

British politician

The Right Honourable The Lord Furness
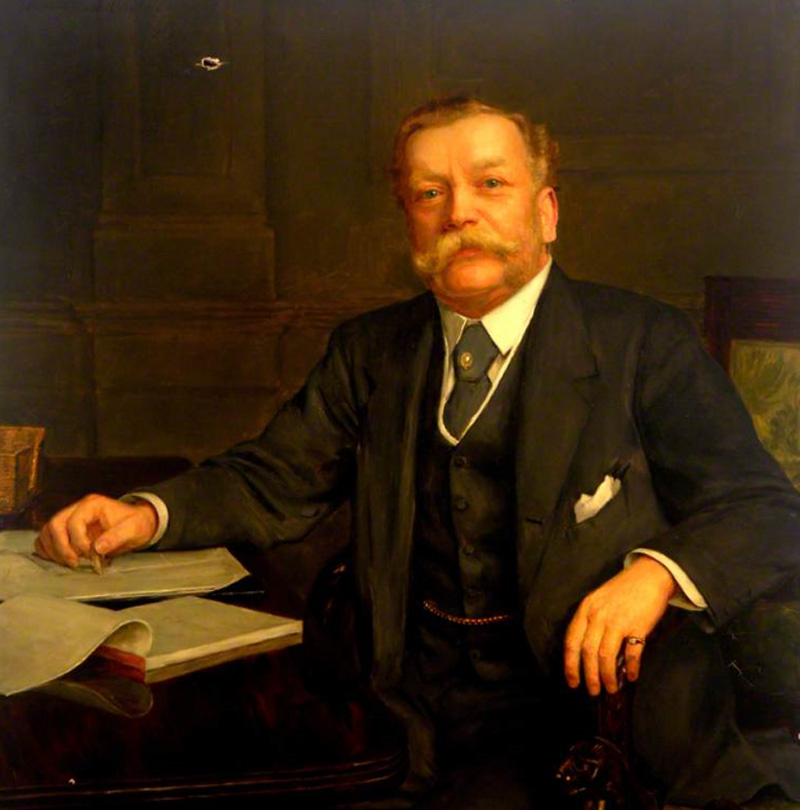

Member of Parliament for The Hartlepools
- In office 1900–1910
- Preceded by: Thomas Richardson II
- Succeeded by: Stephen Furness
- In office 1891–1895
- Preceded by: Thomas Richardson
- Succeeded by: Thomas Richardson II

Personal details
- Born: 23 April 1852 West Hartlepool, Durham
- Died: 10 November 1912 (aged 60)
- Party: Liberal
- Spouse: Jane Annette Suggitt (m. 1876)
- Children: Marmaduke Furness, 1st Viscount Furness

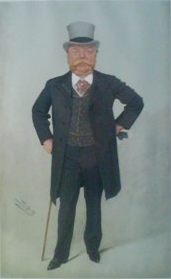
"The Furness Line" Furness as caricatured by Spy (Leslie Ward) in Vanity Fair, October 1908

Christopher Furness, 1st Baron Furness (23 April 1852 – 10 November 1912) was a British businessman and Liberal Party politician.

== Early life ==
Furness was born in West Hartlepool, Durham on 23 April 1852. He was the seventh son of John Furness of West Hartlepool, and Averill Eastor Furness (née Wilson).

== Career ==
He started his career as a buyer in Thomas Furness and Company, wholesale provision merchants, a firm owned by his older brother Thomas, and became a partner two years later. Stock for the business had to be brought in by ship, and Christopher found that it would be cheaper to use their own vessels, rather than hire other people's. Consequently, on his initiative, the firm bought several steam ships from local shipbuilder William Gray & Company in 1877.

In 1882, Christopher Furness and Company was formed and the business was split into two. Thomas kept the provision merchants, while Christopher took charge of the shipping fleet. After seven years as a partner in the shipbuilding firm of Edward Withy and Company, Furness merged it with his own company in 1891, to form Furness, Withy and Company, which was run by his nephew, Sir Stephen Furness, 1st Baronet after his death. By a series of mergers, his firms become the main employers in Hartlepool, until they finally closed in the 1980s.

In 1901, he sold a ship that he had ordered, Huronian, before it sailed. It was reported missing, later lost, early in 1902, on its maiden voyage to Canada. It was deemed to have sunk with the loss of all those aboard. In 1907 a letter in a bottle apparently sent from the ship washed up in Ireland.

Furness was one of the first people to own a turbine-powered steam yacht. Alexander Stephen and Sons of Linthouse, Glasgow launched Emerald in October 1902 and completed her in April 1903. Furness owned her until he died in 1912.

=== Political career ===
Furness was also involved in politics, and was elected Member of Parliament for The Hartlepools at a by-election in 1891. He lost the seat in 1895, but was re-elected in 1900, and served until his re-election in January 1910 was declared void after an electoral petition.

He was appointed a knight bachelor in the 1895 Birthday Honours, and in 1910 he was raised to the peerage as Baron Furness, of Grantley in the West Riding of the County of Yorkshire.

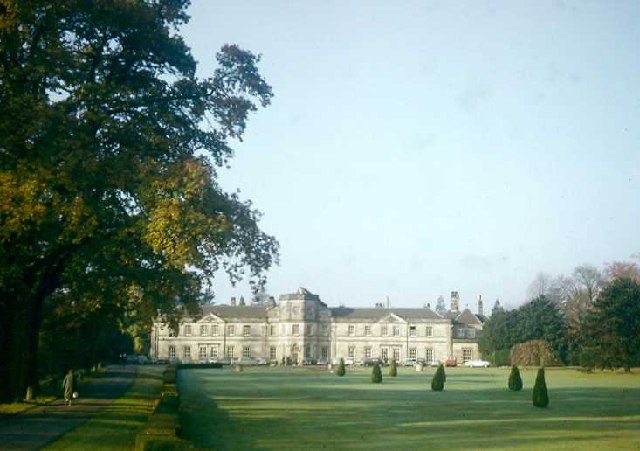
Grantley Hall, home of the Furness family

In 1909 he was made an Honorary Freeman of West Hartlepool.

== Personal life ==
On 16 May 1876, Furness married Jane Annette Suggitt (1855–1930), the only daughter of Henry Suggitt of Brierton, county Durham. They had one son:

- Marmaduke Furness (1883–1940), who in 1918 was created Viscount Furness.

A Non-conformist, in 1900 he promised to pay off all the debts of Non-conformist places of worship in Hartlepool.

Christopher Furness died on 10 November 1912, aged 60. He was succeeded in the barony by his son Marmaduke.

== Arms ==
Coat of arms of Christopher Furness, 1st Baron Furness
Crest Issuant from a chaplet of cinquefoils Vert a bear's paw erect Argent grasping a javelin in bend sinister Sable pendent therefrom by the straps two spurs Or. Escutcheon Or a talbot sejant Sable in chief three fountains Proper. Supporters On either side a sea dog reguardant Proper gutte d'eau. Motto I'll Defend

Parliament of the United Kingdom
Preceded by Thomas Richardson	Member of Parliament for The Hartlepools; 1891–1895	Succeeded by Thomas Richardson (2)
Preceded by Thomas Richardson (2)	Member of Parliament for The Hartlepools; 1900–1910	Succeeded by Stephen Furness
Peerage of the United Kingdom
New creation	Baron Furness; 1910–1912	Succeeded by Marmaduke Furness
