= Thomas Richardson (Hartlepool MP, born 1821) =

English manufacturer of marine engines and Liberal politician

Thomas Richardson MP (6 June 1821 – 29 December 1890) was an English manufacturer of marine engines and a Liberal Party politician.

== Life ==
Richardson was born in Castle Eden, County Durham, the son of Thomas Richardson, a shipbuilder and owner of an engineering works in Hartlepool. Richardson began as an apprentice in his father's iron foundry in Castle Eden. On the death of his father in 1850, Richardson and his brother John took over the business which traded under the name of T. Richardson Sons. Their business was manufacturing marine engines, after they built their first marine engine in 1851. They were also shipbuilders for a short time, but this side of the company went out of business in 1857.

Richardson stood unsuccessfully for Parliament in the newly enfranchised borough of The Hartlepools at the 1868 general election. He won the seat at the 1874 general election, but for financial reasons he resigned from the House of Commons in July 1875 by taking the Chiltern Hundreds He was re-elected as Member of Parliament (MP) for The Hartlepools at the 1880 general election, and held the seat until his death in December 1890, aged 69. When The Liberals split over Irish Home Rule in 1885, Richardson joined the breakaway Liberal Unionist Party, and was returned in 1886 as a Liberal Unionist.

Richardson lived at Kirklevington Grange in Yarm until he built Kirklevington Hall in 1884. He was a J. P. and Deputy lieutenant for County Durham and a J.P. for the North Riding of Yorkshire. He was a member of the Hartlepool Port and Harbour Commissioners. He was also president of Hartlepools Bicycle Club,

== Family ==
Richardson married Maria Greenwell, the daughter of Richard Greenwell, a Sunderland shipowner, in 1843. They had two daughters and four sons.

Parliament of the United Kingdom
Preceded by Ralph Ward Jackson	Member of Parliament for The Hartlepools; 1874–1875	Succeeded by Lowthian Bell
Preceded by Lowthian Bell	Member of Parliament for The Hartlepools; 1880–1890	Succeeded by Christopher Furness
