= W. G. Howard Gritten =

British politician

William George Howard Gritten FRGS (7 February 1870 – 5 April 1943), also known as W. G. Howard Gritten, was a barrister and writer, and a British Conservative politician, who was elected a member of parliament for The Hartlepools in 1918, until 1922, and re-elected in 1929 until his death in 1943.

Born in Westminster, London, on 7 Feb 1870, Gritten was the only son of William Gritten (an architect) and his wife Annie Howard (d.1907). In 1918, he married Helena Blanche Paget, the daughter of the late Commander Webb, R.N. He was educated at Brasenose College, Oxford, won the Donald E. Bridgman Essay Prize, and graduated with honours in Literae Humaniores.

Parliament of the United Kingdom
Preceded by Sir Walter Runciman	Member of Parliament for The Hartlepools; 1918 – 1922	Succeeded by William Jowitt
Preceded by Wilfrid Sugden	Member of Parliament for The Hartlepools; 1929 – 1943	Succeeded by Thomas George Greenwell
