= Sir Stephen Furness, 1st Baronet =

British shipping magnate and Liberal Party politician

Sir Stephen Furness Bt
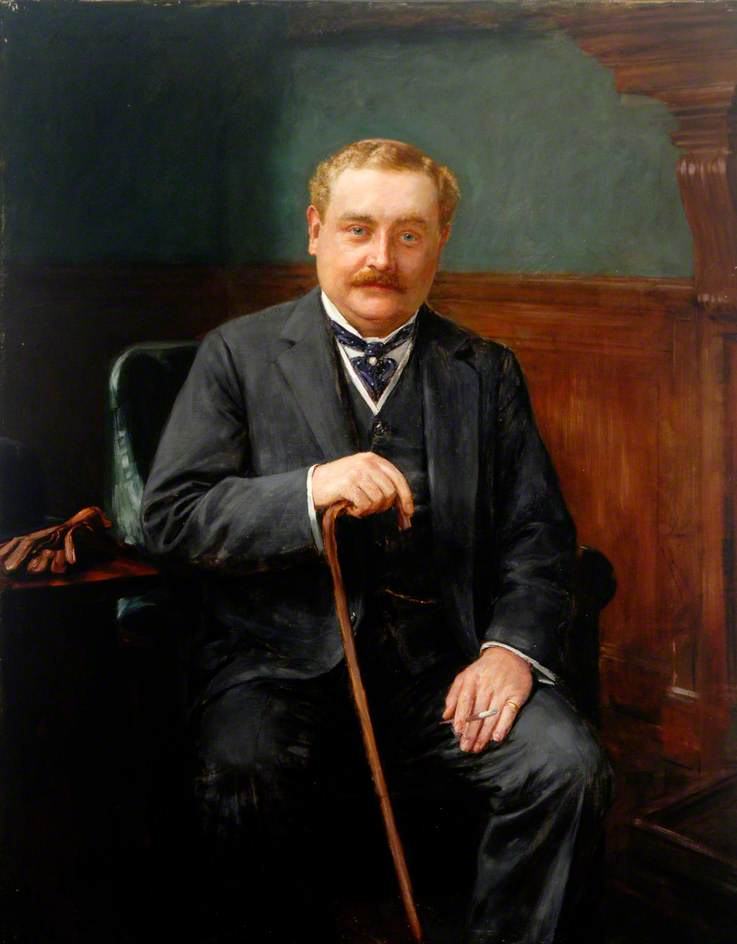
- Stephen W. Furness, by Herbert Arnould Olivier
- Born: 26 May 1872
- Died: 6 September 1914 (aged 40)
- Citizenship: United Kingdom
- Spouse(s): Eleanor Forster, 1899
- Children: 3

Sir Stephen Wilson Furness, 1st Baronet (26 May 1872 – 6 September 1914) was a British shipping magnate and a Liberal Party politician.

A member of a prominent ship-owning family from West Hartlepool, Furness was educated at Ashville College, Harrogate. He was a member of West Hartlepool Town Council in 1897 and of Durham County Council in 1898. He was a Justice of the Peace, and a member of the Hartlepool Port and Harbour Commission.

He was elected as member of parliament (MP) for The Hartlepools at a by-election in June 1910, after the re-election in January 1910 of his uncle Sir Christopher was voided as a result of an electoral petition. When his uncle Christopher died in 1912, he succeeded him as Furness, Withy and Company, and also became chairman of over a dozen other companies and director of more. He was made a baronet on 18 June 1913, of Tunstall Grange, in the borough of West Hartlepool, in the County of Durham, and held his seat in the House of Commons until his death in 1914, aged 42, in an accident while on holiday.

== Personal life ==
In 1899 he married Eleanor Forster, with whom he had three sons and one daughter. They lived at Tunstall Grange, in West Hartlepool.

Parliament of the United Kingdom
Preceded by Sir Christopher Furness	Member of Parliament for The Hartlepools; 1910 – 1914	Succeeded by Sir Walter Runciman, Bt
Baronetage of the United Kingdom
New creation	Baronet of Tunstall Grange; 1913–1914	Succeeded by Christopher Furness
