= Thomas Hutchinson Tristram =

English lawyer

Thomas Hutchinson Tristram KC DCL (24 September 1825 – 8 March 1912) was an English lawyer.

Tristram was the second son of the Rev. Henry Baker Tristram, vicar of Eglingham; the geologist and naturalist Henry Baker Tristram was his elder brother. Tristram was educated at Durham School and matriculated at Lincoln College, Oxford on 11 November 1843. He was a Crewian Exhibitioner from 1843 to 1851 and Boden Sanskrit Scholar in 1848. He graduated as a Bachelor of Civil Law in 1850 and a Doctor of Civil Law in 1854.

Tristram entered the Inner Temple and was called to the Bar of Doctors' Commons on 21 November 1855. He joined the Northern Circuit and was later appointed Judge of the Consistory Court of London. He was Chancellor of the Dioceses of London, Hereford, Ripon, Wakefield and Chichester, and Commissary-General of the Diocese of Canterbury. He was author of a Treatise on the Contentious Probate Practice in the High Court of Justice. His chambers were at 12 King's Bench Walk. On 21 March 1881 he was made a Queen's Counsel.

On 26 October 1861 Tristram married Flora, younger daughter of the Very Rev. Thomas John de Burgh, Dean of Cloyne, by his wife Lady Annie-Louisa, sister of John Hely-Hutchinson, 3rd Earl of Donoughmore; they had two sons and two daughters. Tristram lived variously at Dalton Hill, Albury, Surrey, at Queen Anne's Mansions, St James's Park, London, and at The Elms, London Road, Hampton.

A motion to dissolve the society of Doctors' Commons was entered on 13 January 1858 and the last meeting took place on 10 July 1865. The fellows did not formally surrender their offices, nor in the end their charter, but the society perished with the death of Tristram, its last fellow. The buildings of Doctors' Commons were sold in 1865 and demolished soon after. The site is now largely occupied by the Faraday building.
