= War-time electoral pact =

UK governance agreement in WWI and WWII

The war-time electoral pact was an electoral pact established by the member parties of the United Kingdom coalition governments in the First World War, and re-established in the Second World War. Under the pact, in the event of a by-election only the party which previously held the seat would nominate a candidate, and the other coalition parties would stand aside.

This led to a number of unopposed by-elections as well as strong showings and surprise victories by third party candidates.

The 1914 to 1918 truce was officially broken in June 1918 when the Labour Party decided that the truce should no longer be recognised, although no Labour candidates were nominated before the 1918 general election.
