= Thomas George Greenwell =

British politician

Colonel Thomas George Greenwell, TD, DL (18 December 1894 – 15 November 1967) was a British politician. He was the National Conservative member of parliament (MP) for The Hartlepools and the managing director of the ship-repair yard, T. W. Greenwell and Co. Ltd, a Sunderland yard which had been founded by his father in 1901.

Greenwell was educated at Gresham's School, Holt, and at King's College, Newcastle.

The by-election he won in 1943 was held according to the convention of the war years – neither the Labour nor Liberal parties put up candidates, although Common Wealth Party and Progressive Socialist candidates stood. The 'swing' to the Conservatives was the largest in any by-election in the war years, largely because of Greenwell's strongly pro-Churchillian stance. The post-war 1945 general election only just removed him – there was a recount. In 1951 he was appointed High Sheriff of Durham.

He was also a justice of the peace and Deputy lieutenant for County Durham. In Who's Who he gave his recreation as salmon fishing. He was a member of the Carlton Club.

His daughter, Dame Pamela Hunter, followed him into politics and was chair of the Conservative Party Conference in 1984, the year of the Brighton bombing.

== Sources ==
Parliament of the United Kingdom
Preceded by William Gritten	Member of Parliament for The Hartlepools; 1943 – 1945	Succeeded by D. T. Jones
