= Furness (disambiguation) =

Furness is a peninsula in the southern part of Cumbria, in north-west England.

Furness may also refer to:

- Furness Abbey, a former monastery in Barrow-in-Furness, Cumbria
- Furness Building Society, a British building society
- Furness Church, a church in County Kildare, Ireland
- Furness College, Barrow-in-Furness, A college of further education situated in Barrow-in-Furness, Cumbria
- Furness College, Lancaster, A constituent college of Lancaster University, named after the Furness area
- Furness Fells, a multitude of hills and mountains in Furness
- Furness line, a railway in North West England
- Furness Railway, a former railway company operating in Furness
- Furness Vale, a village in High Peak, Derbyshire, England
- Silurus furness, a species of fish
- Viscount Furness, a former title in the Peerage of the United Kingdom
- Westmorland and Furness, a unitary authority in Cumbria

People with the surname Furness:

- Betty Furness (1916–1994), American actress, consumer advocate and current affairs commentator
- Bruce Furness (21st century), former mayor of Fargo, North Dakota
- Caroline Furness (1869–1936), American astronomer
- Christopher Furness, 1st Baron Furness (1852–1912), British businessman and Liberal politician
- Christopher Furness (VC) (1912–1940), English recipient of the Victoria Cross
- Deborra-Lee Furness (born 1955), Australian actress, director and producer
- Don Furness (Australian rules footballer) (born 1930), former Australian rules footballer
- Don Furness (rugby union) (1921–1993), former rugby union player
- Ed Furness (1911–2005), Canadian comic book artist
- Frank Furness (1839–1912), American architect
- George Furness (1820–1900), British construction engineer
- Harold Furness (1887–1975), American cricketer
- Horace Howard Furness (1833–1912), American Shakespearean scholar
- Oliver Furness (born 2003), British man
- Rachel Furness (born 1988), Northern Irish association footballer
- Richard Furness (1791–1857), British poet
- Steve Furness (1950–2000), American football defensive tackle
- Thelma Furness, Viscountess Furness (1904–1970), American socialite
- Vera Furness (1921–2002), English chemist and industrial manager
- William Anthony Furness, 2nd Viscount Furness (1929–1995), Viscount in the Peerage of the United Kingdom
- William Henry Furness (1802–1896), American abolitionist and Unitarian minister
- William Henry Furness III (1866-1920) American physician, ethnographer and author
- Annis Lee Wister (née Furness, 1830–1908), American translator
- Caroline Furness Jayne (née Furness, 1873–1909), American ethnologist

== See also ==
- Furnace (disambiguation)
- Furnes (disambiguation)
