= Enid Browne, Countess of Kenmare =

Australian wine heiress

The Right Honourable The Countess of Kenmare
- Born: Enid Maude Lindeman; 8 January 1892; Sydney, Australia
- Died: 5 January 1973 (aged 80); Cape Town, South Africa
- Spouse(s): Roderick MacLeod Cameron (m. 1913; died 1914) Frederick "Caviar" Cavendish (m. 1917; died 1931) Marmaduke Furness, 1st Viscount Furness (m. 1933; died 1940) Valentine Browne, 6th Earl of Kenmare (m. 1943; died 1943)
- Children: Rory Cameron; Patricia O'Neill; Frederick Cavendish, 7th Baron Waterpark

Enid Maude Browne, Countess of Kenmare (née Lindeman, previously Cameron, then Cavendish, then Viscountess Furness; 8 January 1892 – 5 January 1973) was an Australian wine heiress who married into the British aristocracy.

== Early life ==
She was born Enid Maude Lindeman on 8 January 1892 Sydney, Australia, and grew up in Strathfield. She was the daughter of Charles Frederick Lindeman and Florence Edith Chapman (1865–1956). Her paternal grandfather was Australian winemaker, Dr. Henry John Lindeman, founder of the wine company Lindeman's in the Hunter Valley wine region.

== Personal life ==
Throughout her lifetime, Enid was married, and widowed, four times. Her first husband was a Canadian-American heir and her last three husbands were all members of the British aristocracy, the last two holding peerages.

=== First marriage ===
On 19 February 1913 in Sydney, 21-year-old Enid married 45-year-old Roderick MacLeod Cameron (1868–1914). He was the son of Sir Roderick Cameron, a Canadian-American businessman who co-founded the R. W. Cameron and Company shipping line in New York City, and Anne Fleming Leavenworth (a daughter of Nathan Leavenworth of New York). Her husband was a member of the Union Club of the City of New York. Before his death from cancer in 1914, they had a son, Roderick "Rory" William Cameron (1914–1985), a travel writer who was a contributing editor of L'ŒIL.

After inheriting several million dollars from her first husband, Enid and young Rory spent World War I moving between Egypt, France, Australia and India.

=== Second marriage ===
On 18 June 1917, she married Brigadier-General Frederick "Caviar" William Lawrence Shepperd Hart Cavendish (1877–1931). He was the son of William Thomas Cavendish (a grandson of the 2nd Baron Waterpark) and Cecilia Lafayette Kennedy (a daughter of James Kennedy of The Limes, County Down, Ireland). His elder brother, Henry Sheppard Hart Cavendish, inherited the barony of Waterpark, which eventually was inherited by her son Frederick. They had two children:

- Patricia Enid Cavendish (1925–2019), who married Olympic swimmer Frank Thomas O'Neill in 1950. They divorced in 1954 and she married Count Aymon de Roussy de Sales, son of Count Raoul Roussy de Sales and Reine Marie Tracy, in 1957. They divorced and she remarried her first husband in 1969. She wrote a biography, A Lion in the Bedroom (2004).
- Frederick Caryll Philip Cavendish, 7th Baron Waterpark (1926–2013), who married Danièle Alice Guirche, daughter of Roger Guirche, in 1951.

After the war, Cavendish took command of the 9th Lancers in Egypt where she met George Herbert, 5th Earl of Carnarvon, who found and excavated Tutankhamun's tomb in the Valley of the Kings. Reportedly, Enid was one of the first to be taken down into Tutankhamen's tomb. They later moved to Grosvenor Square in London, where she joined the Bright Young People. Cavendish died from a cerebral hemorrhage at their apartment in Paris in 1931.

=== Third marriage ===
She then married Marmaduke Furness, 1st Viscount Furness on 3 August 1933 at St George's, Hanover Square. A British shipping magnate who was considered one of the richest men in the world, he was the son of Christopher Furness, 1st Baron Furness and Jane Annette Suggitt. He had previously been married to Ada "Daisy" Hogg, who died in 1921, and Thelma Morgan Converse, the former wife of James Vail Converse and a daughter of Harry Hays Morgan Sr., an American diplomat, and sister to Gloria Morgan Vanderbilt (mother of Gloria Vanderbilt). Thelma and Marmaduke had divorced in 1933 as a result of her affairs with Aly Khan and the Prince of Wales (later Edward VIII). From her marriage to Furness, she was stepmother to William Anthony Furness, 2nd Viscount Furness.

In 1939, she acquired Villa La Fiorentina at Saint-Jean-Cap-Ferrat, and three other houses on the property, Le Clos, La Florida and La Maison Blanche, all of which she renovated and updated with her son Rory. At La Fiorentina, she dined with Frank Sinatra, Ginger Rogers, Fred Astaire and Rita Hayworth. Lord Furness died of liver cancer in October 1940 in occupied France and Enid was forced to escape to England.

=== Fourth marriage ===
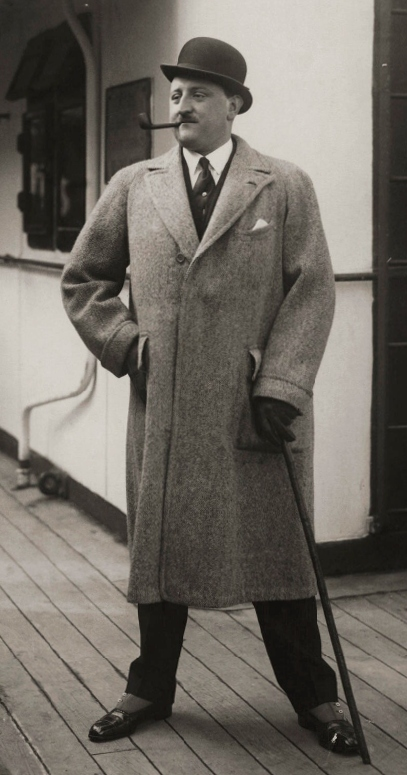
Lord Kenmare, 1923

Her fourth, and last marriage, was to Valentine Browne, 6th Earl of Kenmare, on 26 January 1943. He was the eldest son of Valentine Browne, 5th Earl of Kenmare and Hon. Elizabeth Baring (eldest daughter of Edward Baring, 1st Baron Revelstoke). He was previously married, and divorced, from Doris Delevingne, styled Viscountess Castlerosse. He died on 20 September 1943, less than a year after their marriage.

Throughout her life, she was known for her friendships with many prominent people including author W. Somerset Maugham (who dubbed her "Lady Killmore"), Daisy Fellowes, Kathleen, Countess of Drogheda, Beryl Markham, and Barbara Hutton. In the 1960s, she moved to Kenya with her daughter before moving to South Africa in 1968. She eventually sold La Fiorentina to Mary Wells Lawrence in 1969 and bought Broadlands in Somerset West, Cape Province.

Lady Kenmare died on 5 January 1973 at Cape Town, South Africa.

== Descendants ==
Through her son Frederick, she was a grandmother of Hon. Caroline Laurence Patricia Cavendish (born 1952), who married George Michael Richard Goulding; Hon. Juliet Enid Marie Gabrielle Cavendish (born 1953), who married Charles Dumaresq Nicholson; and Roderick Cavendish, 8th Baron Waterpark (born 1959), who married Anne Asquith (a daughter of Hon. Luke Asquith, granddaughter of Cyril Asquith, Baron Asquith of Bishopstone, and great-granddaughter of British Prime Minister H. H. Asquith).
