= Christopher Furness =

Christopher Furness may refer to:

- Christopher Furness, 1st Baron Furness (1852–1912), British businessman, baron and politician
- Christopher Furness (VC) (1912–1940), English recipient of the Victoria Cross
- Sir Christopher Furness, 2nd Baronet (1900–1974), of the Furness baronets

== See also ==
- Furness (disambiguation)
