= Jean Schlumberger =

Jean Schlumberger may refer to:

- Jean Schlumberger (writer) (1877–1968), French man of letters
- Jean Schlumberger (jewelry designer)
