= Van Day Truex =

American fashion designer (1904–1979)

Van Day Truex (March 15, 1904 – April 24, 1979) was an American interior designer, professor of design, and painter and a Chevalier of the Legion of Honor (Chevalier de la Légion d'Honneur).

== Career ==
Upon graduation in 1926, he joined the faculty and eventually was appointed director in Paris. Around that time he became a decorator, and became a friend of Elsie de Wolfe. The Paris branch later evolved into Parsons Paris (autumn 2013).

World War II forced him to return to New York in 1939. The New York School of Applied and Fine Arts (1909–1936) — formerly the New York School of Art (1898–1909) — had been renamed Parsons School of Design 1936–2005, after its late co-founder, and Van Day Truex was named president. He continued his painting and presented some one-man shows. His work as designer for Grace Moore, the opera soprano, with whom he established a close friendship, mentioned in her autobiography. In 1951 Van Day Truex was lauded by France as a Chevalier of the Legion of Honor (Chevalier de la Légion d'Honneur). The following year, however, a disagreement with the board of the Parson School led to his demotion to consultant. His next appointment was as artist-in-residence at the American Academy in Rome. Returning to New York in 1955, he was chosen by Walter Hoving, the new president of Tiffany & Co., as the director of design for the company. Meanwhile, he continued his favorite enterprise in the restoration or redecoration of homes in New York and Provence, his and others. In 1978, he returned from France at the insistence of Hoving to serve as vice-president of Tiffany's.

=== Design legacy ===
His style as a designer emphasized aesthetics over function. He was not, in fact, interested in the mechanical process of materials, but rather the visual representation. During a time when interior design was not as highly recognized, Truex gave a sense of quality and style that was driven by a motivated and controlled approach. Truex's style continued to influence 20th-century designers.

Truex also had a great influence in the fashion world during his time at Tiffany & Co. He hired French-born jewelry designer Jean Schlumberger. Schlumberger who brought a new look of mythological creatures from the sea and forest. Truex's decision to employ Schlumberger impacted how Tiffany's continued to establish the company as an iconic image.

Truex has been dubbed "the man who defined twentieth-century taste and style" by biographer Adam Lewis. Others have called him the father of 20th-century American design.

Reviving Truex's one-of-a-kind pieces, Scott Himmel has produced a traditional furniture line called Truex American Furniture.

== Personal life ==
Over the years, Van Day Truex had numerous friends and companions who came and went. At the last his closest friends were fellow designer, Billy Baldwin and patron-client, Rory Cameron, the travel writer.

Truex died of a heart attack in his New York apartment April 24, 1979. He was preceded in death by all close family members except his long time sponsor, his aunt Leta Day Nicol. His ashes were buried in Provence at Les Quatre Sources, a home designed by Truex for Rory Cameron.
