= Tiffany & Co. flagship store =

Retail building in Manhattan, New York

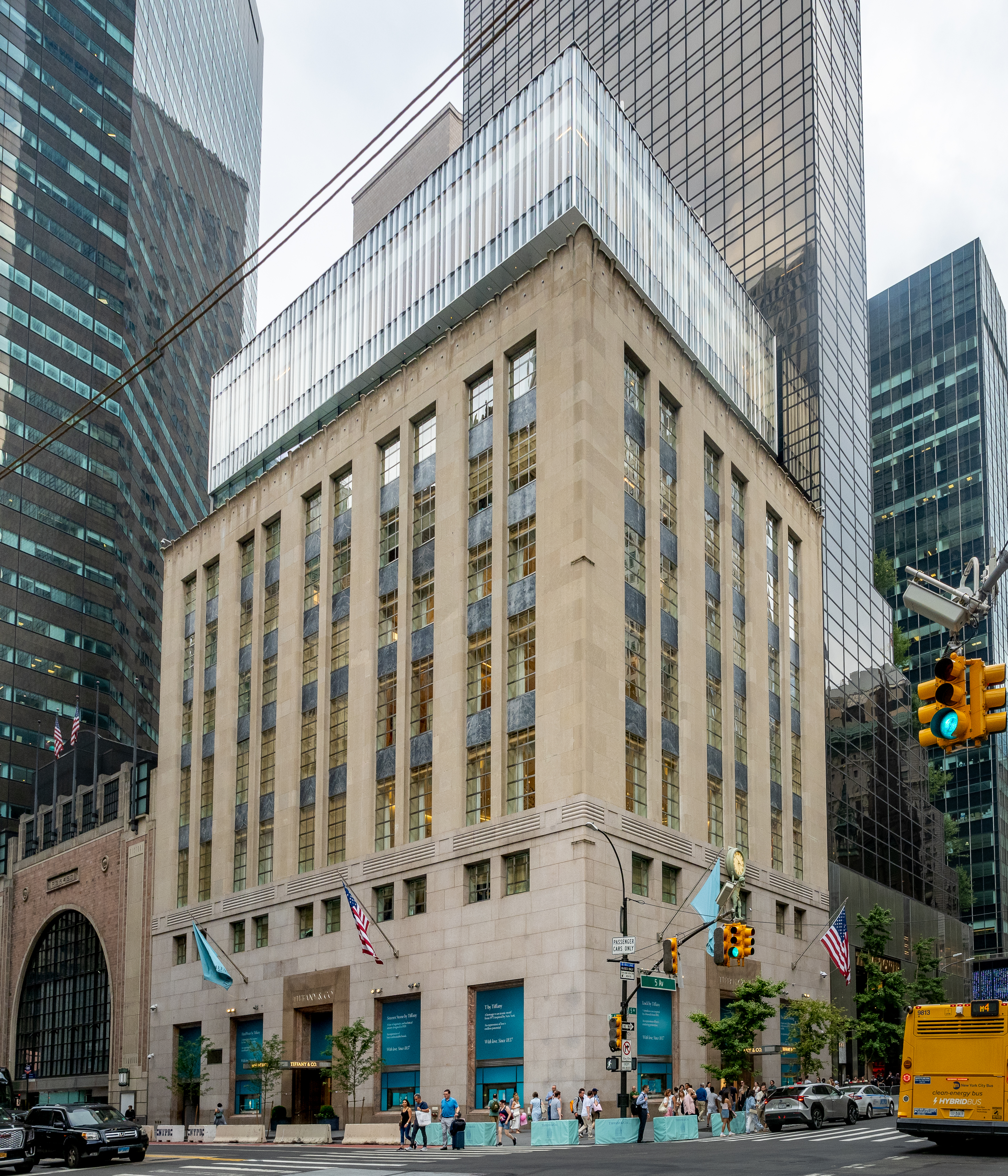
- The Tiffany flagship in 2024

General information
- Type: Retail
- Location: 727 Fifth Avenue, Manhattan, New York City
- Coordinates: 40.7626°N 73.9738°W
- Completed: 1940
- Renovated: 1980, 2001–2006, 2020–2023
- Owner: Tiffany & Co.

Technical details
- Floor count: 10

Design and construction
- Architect: Cross & Cross
- Main contractor: Turner Construction

The Tiffany & Co. flagship store (also known as The Landmark) is a ten-story retail building in Midtown Manhattan, New York City, within the luxury shopping district on Fifth Avenue between 49th and 60th Streets. The building, at 727 Fifth Avenue, has served as Tiffany & Co.'s sixth flagship store since its completion in 1940. It was designed by New York City architects Cross & Cross in a "conservative modern" style.

The building's facade is made of granite and limestone. Its five storefront displays, which are changed about eight times a year, have had various designers, including Gene Moore (who designed displays for over 40 years). A 9-foot (2.7 m) statue of the mythological figure Atlas is situated on the second story of the building's west facade, facing Fifth Avenue. The building's first-floor main salesroom, covering 8,400 sq ft (780 m^{2}) with a ceiling 24 ft (7.3 m) tall, has no supporting columns in its superstructure. The upper floors were built with public and private showrooms.

Prior to the building's construction, Tiffany & Co. had its flagship at 401 Fifth Avenue, twenty blocks south. The new site was leased from First National City Bank in May 1939 and the store opened on October 21, 1940; Tiffany's bought the underlying land in 1963. The building was notably featured in the 1961 film Breakfast at Tiffany's. The store, originally seven stories tall, was expanded in 1980 with a three-story rooftop addition designed by Peter Claman. Tiffany's sold the building in 1984, continuing to lease the structure, and reacquired it fifteen years later. The store was renovated during the early 2000s. As part of another renovation, including a replacement rooftop structure, the store was temporarily closed from 2020 to 2023.

== Site ==
The Tiffany & Co. flagship store is at 727 Fifth Avenue in the Midtown Manhattan neighborhood of New York City. The rectangular land lot is at the southeastern corner of Fifth Avenue to the west and 57th Street to the north. The lot covers approximately 11,000 square feet (1,000 m^{2}), with a frontage of 85.5 feet (26 m) on Fifth Avenue and 125 feet (38 m) on 57th Street. The building is on the same city block as Trump Tower to the south and 590 Madison Avenue to the east. Other nearby buildings include 3 East 57th Street and 745 Fifth Avenue to the north, the Bergdorf Goodman Building and Solow Building to the northwest, the Crown Building to the west, 712 Fifth Avenue to the southwest, Corning Glass Building to the south, and 550 Madison Avenue to the southeast.

In the early 20th century, the section of Fifth Avenue south of 59th Street was becoming a commercial area. By the 1920s, the intersection of Fifth Avenue and 57th Street contained commercial buildings, including the Heckscher (now Crown) Building and a branch of the New York Trust Company, which were interspersed with 19th-century mansions, music shops, and art dealerships. The site of the current Tiffany's flagship had been occupied by Collis P. Huntington's mansion until 1926.

== Architecture ==
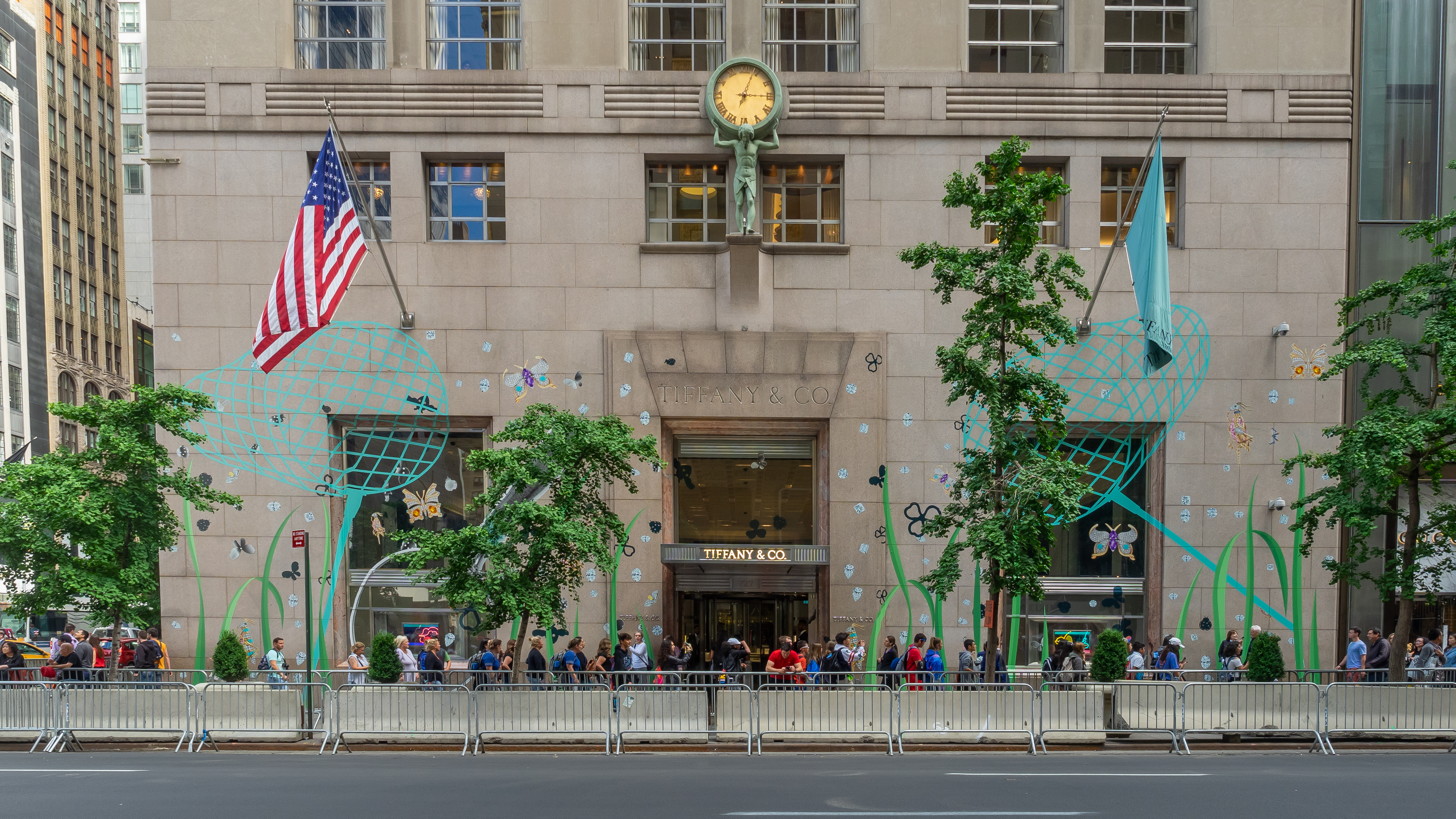
Entranceway from Fifth Avenue

The original building is a seven-story structure designed by New York City architects Cross & Cross in a "conservative modern" style and completed in 1940. The main contractor for the work was Turner Construction. Architectural historian Paul Goldberger cites it as an important retail building in New York City, and an important example of the transition from classicism to modernism in architecture. Upon the building's completion, a critic for Architectural Forum magazine characterized it as a monumental structure with an "orthodox" exterior and a utilitarian interior.

A three-story addition was built in 1980 to designs by Peter Claman. A 2020s renovation replaced the 1980 addition with a similarly-sized structure. As of 2023, the building encompasses 110,000 square feet (10,000 m^{2}) of retail space. The store has been featured in multiple works of film and literature, such as Truman Capote's novella Breakfast at Tiffany's (1958) and the films Breakfast at Tiffany's (1961) and Sweet Home Alabama (2002).

=== Exterior ===
The original structure's facade has a pink-granite base with limestone on its upper stories. The main entrance, on the western facade, has a rectangular limestone frame with a wheat-leaf pattern. The windows in the vertical bays are separated horizontally by marble spandrels between each floor. The window frames are made of stainless steel and are bounded by pieces of Alpine marble, which hold the facade's shatterproof glass windows in place. The top of the original building has a scalloped parapet. The use of limestone in the facade was intended to evoke older store buildings, but Cross & Cross used a more modernistic Art Deco style because, according to the author Peter Pennoyer, it "better expressed the modern age".

The eighth through tenth stories are clad with a glass facade designed by Office for Metropolitan Architecture. The eighth and ninth stories contain flat glass panes without any exterior columns. The top floor's facade is made of two types of glass, which is inspired by the original building's parapet. The top floor uses flat panes of low emissivity glass to reduce energy use, as well as slumped glass panes that are more structurally sturdy and serve as one-way mirrors. The flat roof of the building was covered in Ludowici quarry tile.

The building's exterior windows include five storefront displays (two on Fifth Avenue and three on 57th Street), which are changed about eight times a year and are planned more than a year in advance. The displays have been designed by various designers over their history. Gene Moore designed the displays for nearly forty years using smaller materials to frame the more expensive jewelry. Other window dressers have included Rachel Zoe, who in 2012 designed displays depicting the "Hollywood glamour" of the mid-20th century, as well as Baz Luhrmann and Catherine Martin, who designed Great Gatsby-themed displays in 2013.

==== Atlas statue ====
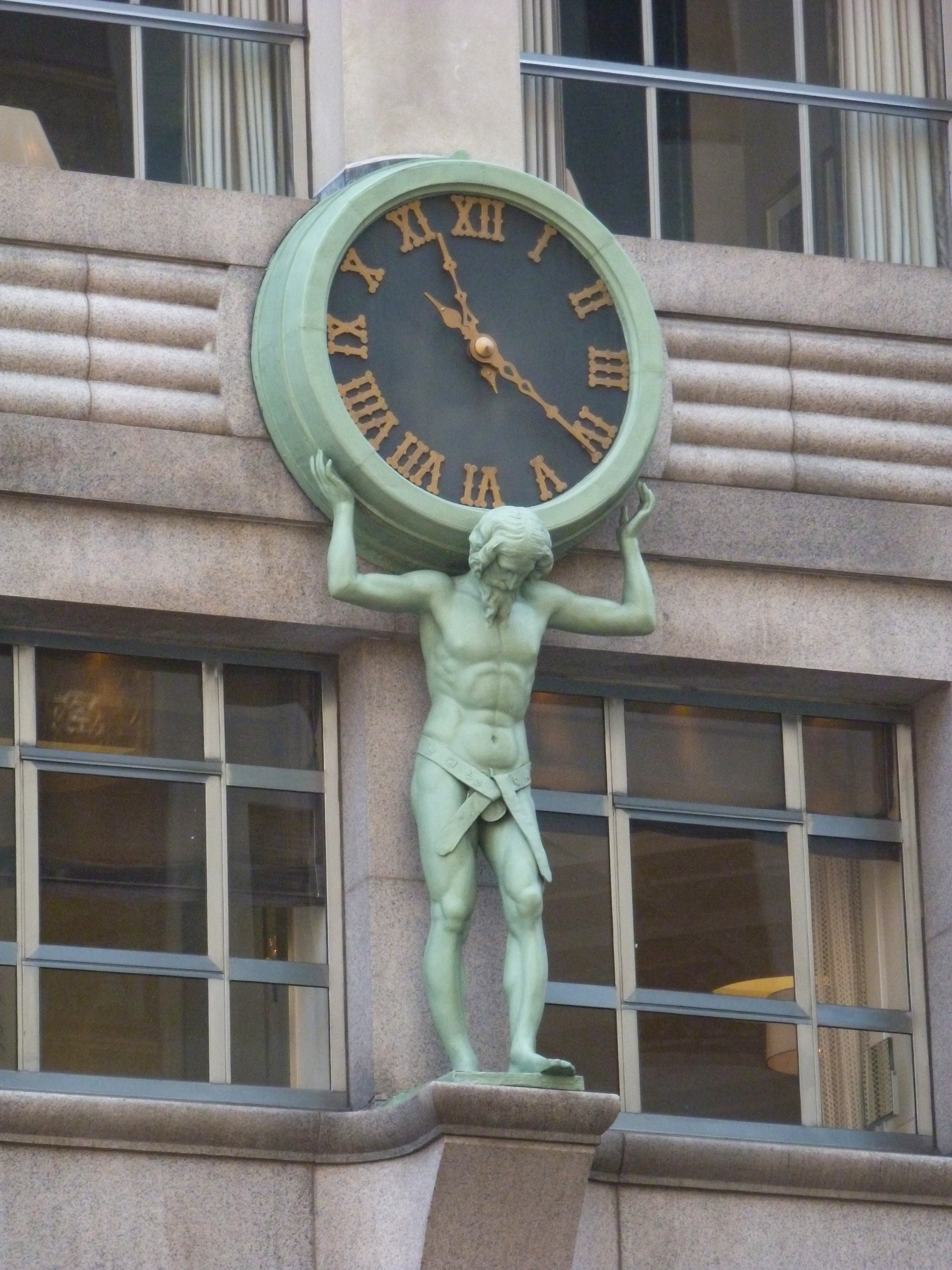
Statue of Atlas

A 9-foot (2.7 m) statue of the mythological figure Atlas is situated on the second story of the building's west facade, facing Fifth Avenue. The statue, shouldering a four-foot-wide clock, was built to stand atop the entranceway to the company's third flagship store in 1853. Charles Tiffany commissioned his friend Henry Frederick Metzler, a carver of ship figureheads, to design the work. The statue has traveled as the company has relocated its flagship. The statue stood as an icon of the brand; the fifth flagship store did not have the name "Tiffany" appear on its facades, with only the statue and clock denoting the store's presence.

The statue is a realistic depiction of a bearded, thin man, wearing nothing except a crossed leather strap. The figure stands upright, unbent despite appearing to hold the weight of the large clock above it. His left foot is placed in front of him, partially off the statue's base. It was sculpted from wood of a fir tree, painted to resemble the patina of weathered bronze; the feet are made of solid lead. Tiffany & Co. has released products based on the statue's design, and has created replicas for its stores in other locations across the country.

=== Interior ===
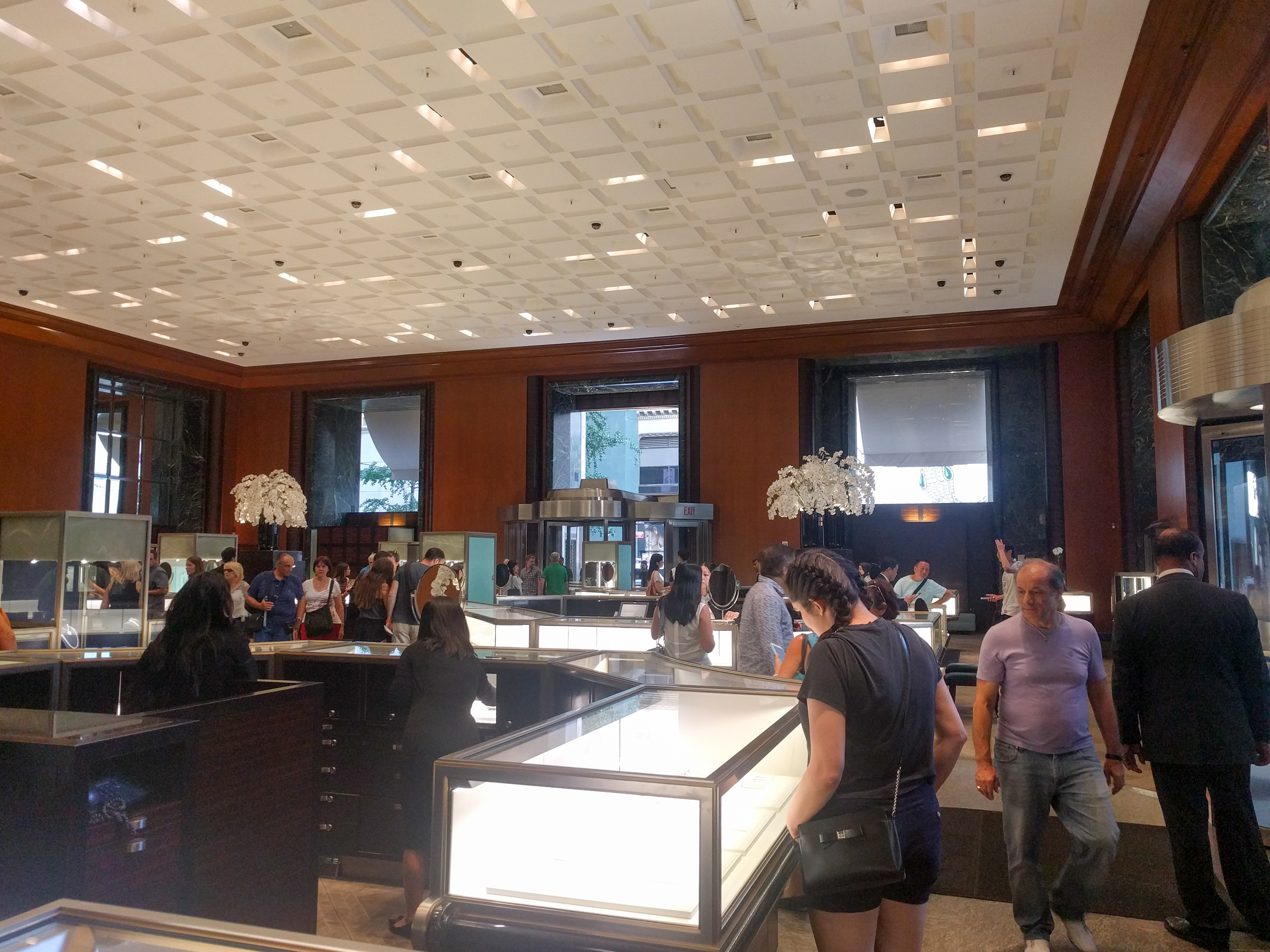
Main salesroom, 2016

The building's first-floor main salesroom has 8,400 sq ft (780 m^{2}) and is 24 ft (7.3 m) tall. It has no supporting columns in its superstructure. The ceiling is instead supported by three 100-ton trusses spanning the 85-foot (26 m) width of the building, each of which consists of upper and lower girders connected by crossbeams. Upon the building's completion, the floors and pilasters were made of teakwood, while the display cases were decorated in teak, walnut, and marble. Jewelry and other merchandise was placed in wooden display cases with stainless-steel frames. These cases rested on wood, stainless steel, or granite pedestals. The display cases and spaces were illuminated using indirect lighting fixtures. The salesroom's most prominent permanent display is the Tiffany Yellow Diamond, a 128.54-carat gem. Metalwork such as brass, copper, silver, and stainless steel is used throughout the interior.

The upper floors were built with public and private showrooms. The first four stories were used by retail departments, while the upper stories had offices, jewelers' studios, and a repair shop. The first mezzanine level contained three private showrooms, one each in the French, English, and Modern architectural styles. There were also five glass-enclosed buying rooms. The flagship store includes a café on its fourth floor, Blue Box Cafe, operated by the restaurateur Daniel Boulud and opened in 2017. The café has a breakfast, lunch, and tea menu and is decorated in Tiffany Blue, the color for which the brand is known. The fifth floor contains memorabilia such as photos of Audrey Hepburn and a minidress that she wore in the film Breakfast at Tiffany's. An oak staircase, with mirrors and transparent balustrades, runs from the first to the seventh floors. Following the 2020s renovation, the floors above the eighth story were gutted and replaced. The eighth and ninth stories became into an exhibit and event space. Next to this space is an outdoor terrace with seats and a bar.

When it reopened in 2023, the store had forty artworks by artists including Damien Hirst, Jenny Holzer, Rashid Johnson, and Richard Prince. By 2024, the building had 58 works of art. Among these are Jean-Michel Basquiat's painting Equals Pi, installed on the ground floor. The works also included a color-changing oval designed by James Turrell, a cabinet by Hirst, a group of mirrored disks by Anish Kapoor, and animations for 14 window frames. The eighth floor has a sculpture of an apple, created by Claude Lalanne of the art duo Les Lalanne; it alludes to New York City's nickname, the "Big Apple".

The building was one of the first major retail buildings built with central air conditioning in New York City. A heating plant for the ground floor was placed in the basement, while the upper floors were heated and ventilated through the original double-story penthouse on the roof.

== History ==
=== Construction ===
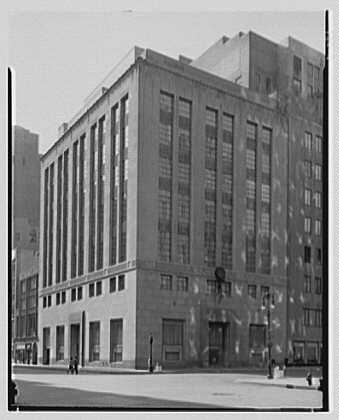
The building in 1942

The flagship store is the sixth for the company, which moved uptown five times since its founding in 1837. Immediately prior to the construction of the building at Fifth Avenue and 57th Street, Tiffany & Co. had its flagship at 401 Fifth Avenue, twenty blocks south. In May 1939, the company leased a site at 57th Street from First National City Bank, which acted as trustee for the William Waldorf Astor estate. In a multi-part transaction, National City Bank acquired the 57th Street site from the previous owner of the Huntington site, as well as Tiffany's 37th Street building. Tiffany's then hired Cross & Cross to design a new flagship at that location. That August, Cross & Cross filed plans for the 57th Street structure with the New York City Department of Buildings. Turner Construction was awarded the general construction contract and had already started demolishing the previous four-story structure on the site.

Prior to the 727 Fifth Avenue building's completion, Charles B. Driscoll wrote in April 1940: "The new Tiffany building is close enough to completion to indicate that it is to be one of the substantial ornaments to this part of town." The 727 Fifth Avenue store opened on October 21, 1940, without any fanfare; it was visited by 12,000 people in its first day of operation. It had an estimated cost of $1 million. Upon the building's completion, the Fifth Avenue Association deemed it the "best new structure erected in the Fifth Avenue section during 1940". Cross & Cross never designed another building in New York City and ceased operation in 1942.

=== 20th century ===
In 1961, the store's interior and exterior were filmed for Breakfast at Tiffany's, a culturally significant film designated by the Library of Congress. Two years later, Tiffany's bought the land under its flagship location from First National City Bank, as well as the adjacent corner property that was occupied by Bonwit Teller. The company paid $1.25 million for the store building and $2.8 million for the corner property. Lord Astor of Hever, the beneficiary of the Astor trust that owned the lots, had recently moved to the United Kingdom and was forced to sell the lots. British law at the time forbade its subjects to own any property outside the United Kingdom.

By the late 1970s, the Tiffany's flagship had become overcrowded, in part because the company's overall success had resulted in increased sales. Tiffany & Co. president Walter Hoving contemplated a proposal to move a portion of the store across the intersection, but rejected the idea because transporting the merchandise every day would have caused logistical issues. In 1978, Peter Claman was hired to design a 13,500-square-foot (1,250 m^{2}) expansion, which included constructing three stories on the roof. The expansion was completed in 1980. Tiffany's received a $5 million tax credit for completing the expansion, allowing them to save money on the expansion. The company's eligibility for the tax credit was subsequently investigated because the credit was not supposed to be given to retailers.

Developer and future U.S. president Donald Trump purchased the building's air rights for $5 million in 1979 while he was developing the neighboring Trump Tower. Trump had considered the Tiffany's flagship to be the city's best real-estate property, and he had wanted to prevent another developer from tearing down the store to build a taller building. Trump later named his daughter Tiffany Trump after the location; the air rights acquisition was reportedly one of his favorite deals.

After Avon Products acquired Tiffany's in the early 1980s, the building was sold in 1984 to a Texas investment syndicate, who paid $66.5 million and leased the space back to Tiffany's. The syndicate resold the building to Daiichi Real Estate in 1986 for $94.35 million. Daiichi paid about $959 per square foot ($10,320/m^{2}), which at the time was the highest price per square foot for a commercial property in the United States. At the time, the property contained 98,000 square feet (9,100 m^{2}). Following the early 1990s recession, the property became unprofitable for Daiichi, which resold the building to Tiffany's in 1999 for $94 million.

In 1998, preservationists requested that the New York City Landmarks Preservation Commission (LPC) consider the Tiffany's flagship for city landmark status. According to preservationist John Jurayj, the LPC said it would take the designation into consideration, but it did not make any further comment on the issue. Preservationists sent another request to the LPC in 2001, requesting the Tiffany's store be considered for landmark status, but they again received no responses over the following several years.

=== 21st century ===
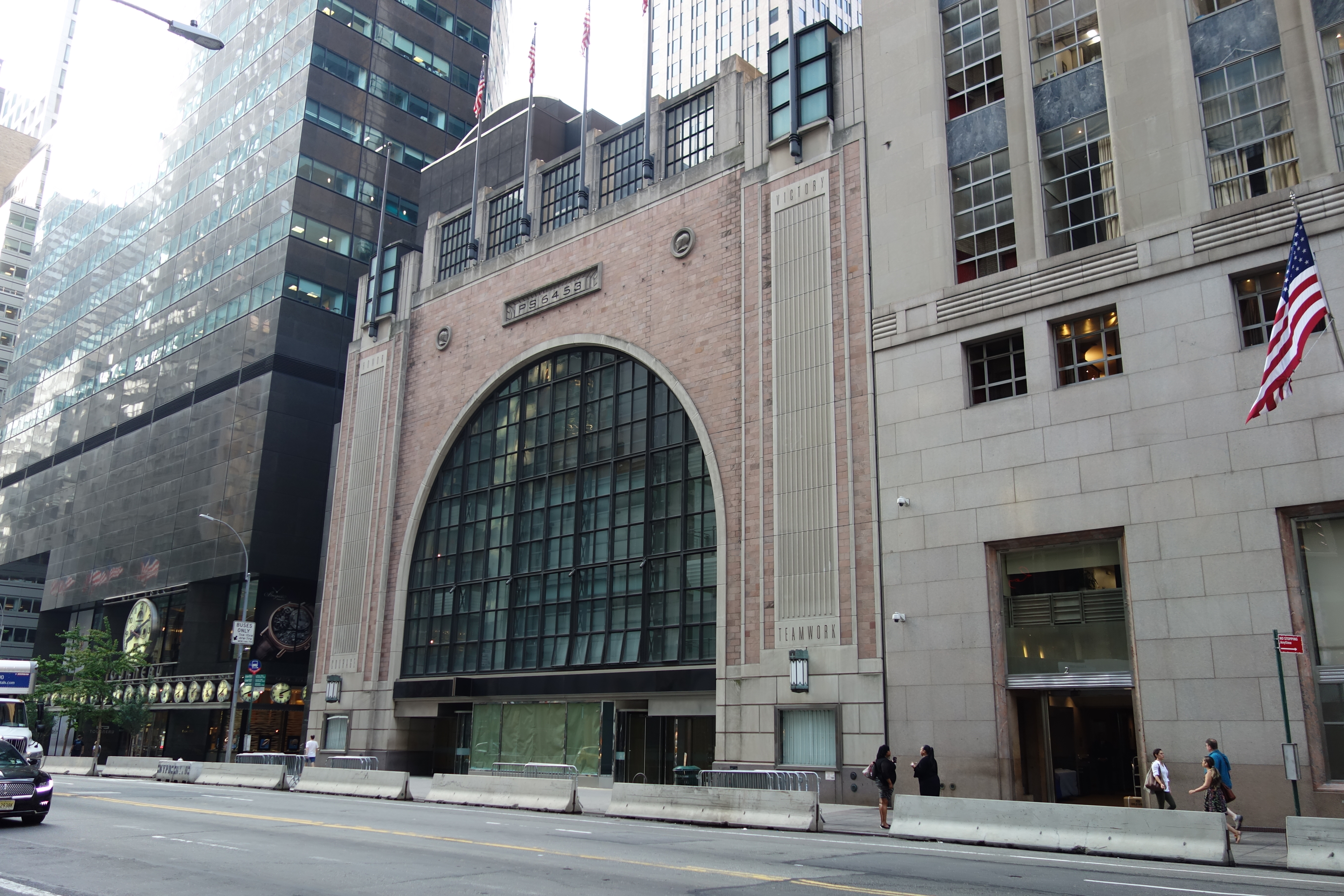
6 East 57th Street

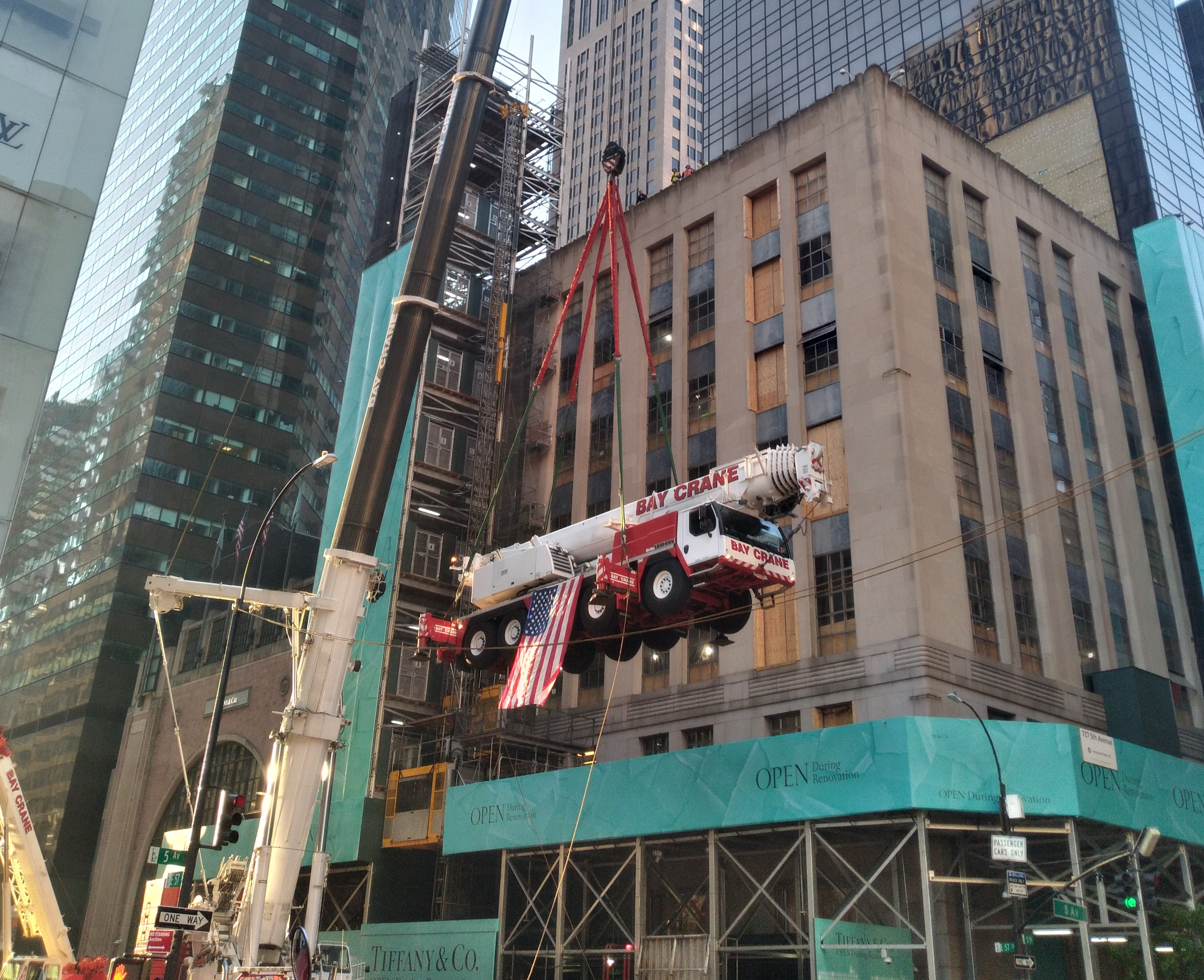
105-ton crane lifting a 66-ton crane to the building's roof during renovation

Starting in 2001, Yabu Pushelberg redesigned portions of the flagship store, reworking its second and fourth floors, and opening its fifth and sixth into public spaces. The renovation involved moving office spaces to other locations, expanding retail space from 32,500 to 40,500 square feet (3,020 to 3,760 m^{2}). While the renovation was initially scheduled to be completed in 2004, it was not actually finished until late 2006. A 2017 renovation added a cafe inside the building, quoted by news sources as finally allowing for a "breakfast at Tiffany"; the menu also includes a meal with that name.

==== 2020s renovation ====
In 2019, as the company LVMH was preparing to purchase Tiffany & Company, LVMH CEO Bernard Arnault toured the flagship store and was lost, which factored into his decision to remodel and brighten the store's interior. In 2020, Tiffany began a two-year renovation of 727 Fifth Avenue and relocated to a temporary store in the adjacent 6 East 57th Street, called The Tiffany Flagship Next Door. The four-story building at 6 East 57th Street was built for Nike's Niketown store, which occupied the space from 1996 to 2017, and had also been used by a Tiffany's pop-up store. At the time, the building was owned by the Trump Organization, which owns Trump Tower. During January 2020, workers moved more than 114,000 pieces of jewelry between the two buildings; the relocations were done quietly to prevent robberies.

Exterior renderings of the renovated building were revealed in August 2020. The renovation process involved a redesign of the building's interior spaces, as well as the replacement of a three-story rooftop addition (built in 1980) with a similarly-sized addition designed by OMA. The renovation necessitated lifting a crane onto the building's roof, only the fourth time in the city's history that had occurred. A 105-ton crane, with assistance from another and eight trucks as counterweights, lifted a 66-ton crane onto the structure. The project's interior designer, Peter Marino, added distinct design details within each room of the store.

The main store reopened on April 27, 2023. Tiffany & Co. hosted a two-day party to celebrate the reopening. Upon the store's reopening, it was known officially as "The Landmark". Officials of LVMH said they intended for the store to cater to the "ultra-elite", and Tiffany's CEO Anthony Ledru said, "For us, the Landmark is now the lighthouse of the brand." The first art exhibit at the Landmark flagship store opened in March 2024.

== See also ==
- 15 Union Square West, the company's fourth flagship store
- Tiffany and Company Building, the company's fifth flagship
