= Valentine Browne, 6th Earl of Kenmare =

Anglo-Irish aristocrat (1891–1943)

The Right Honourable The Earl of Kenmare
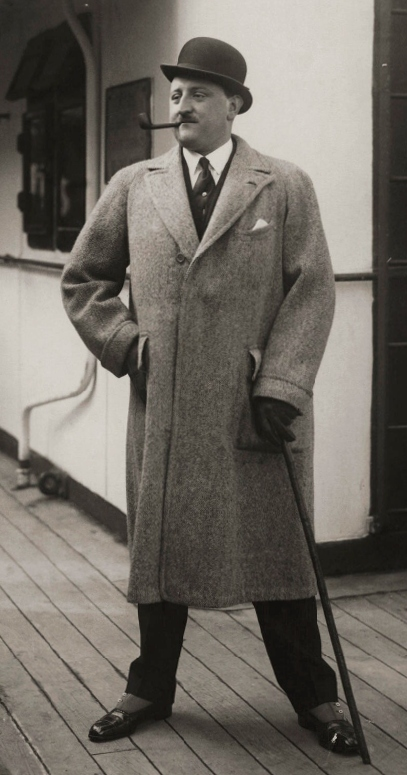
- Browne in 1923
- Born: Valentine Edward Charles Browne; 29 May 1891; Grosvenor Square, London
- Died: 20 September 1943 (aged 52)
- Education: Trinity College, Cambridge
- Spouse(s): Jessie "Doris" Delevingne (m. 1928; div. 1938) Enid Furness, Viscountess Furness (m. 1943)
- Parent(s): Valentine Browne, 5th Earl of Kenmare; Hon. Elizabeth Baring
- Military career
- Allegiance: United Kingdom
- Branch: British Army
- Rank: Captain
- Unit: Irish Guards
- Conflicts: World War I; Western Front (WIA)

Valentine Edward Charles Browne, 6th Earl of Kenmare (29 May 1891 – 20 September 1943), styled Viscount Castlerosse from 1905 to 1941, was the Earl of Kenmare and the son of Valentine Browne, 5th Earl of Kenmare.

== Early life ==
Born 29 May 1891 in Grosvenor Square, London, eldest son of Valentine Browne, 5th Earl of Kenmare, and Elizabeth Baring. Among his siblings were sister, Lady Dorothy Margaret (who married Lord Edward Arthur Grosvenor, youngest son of The 1st Duke of Westminster), Lady Cecilia Kathleen (who married Col. Hon. Thomas Eustace Vesey), Lt. Hon. Maurice Henry Dermot Browne (who was killed in action during World War I), and Gerald Browne (who died unmarried).

His paternal grandparents were Valentine Browne, 4th Earl of Kenmare and Gertrude Thynne (a daughter of The Rev. Lord Charles Thynne, Canon of Canterbury, and granddaughter of the 2nd Marquess of Bath). His mother was the eldest daughter of Edward Baring, 1st Baron Revelstoke and Louisa Emily Charlotte Bulteel (a daughter of John Crocker Bulteel, MP, and granddaughter of the 2nd Earl Grey).

After his birth, he was sent to the family seat in Killarney where he spent his early childhood. He was educated in England, at Downside School, and at Trinity College, Cambridge, from which he received a BA, before he emigrated to Europe.

== Career ==
He joined the Irish Guards in 1914, served briefly in the First World War as a captain in the Irish Guards and was wounded. While convalescing in Paris in 1915 he met Max Aitken, the future newspaper baron Beaverbrook, who would be his employer for the rest of his life.

On his return to London, he entered the banking business for a period but soon became a journalist, best known for his widely read 'Londoner's Log'. He was a journalist for the Sunday Express, and a director of the Evening Standard, the Daily Express and the Sunday Express, and great friend of their publisher, Lord Beaverbrook. After he became a regular columnist for the Sunday Express in April 1926, his "witty but unmalicious commentary" on contemporary public life made him "the most celebrated gossip columnist in the British press" of his time. He also wrote the screenplay for the 1932 film comedy Diamond Cut Diamond and the story for the 1942 film about Amy Johnson, They Flew Alone.

He was famous for his flashing wit; when a woman told him "Lord Castlerosse, if that stomach was on a woman, I would say she was pregnant", he answered "Half an hour ago it was, and she is!" He was active in Killarney affairs, creating a lakeside golf course and supporting Killarney Races, bringing a wave of tourism to Kerry.

Upon the death of his father in November 1941, he succeeded as the 6th Earl of Kenmare.

== Personal life ==
Lord Castlerosse was married twice. On 16 May 1928, he married his first wife, the courtesan Doris Delevingne. They had no issue and divorced in 1938, and she, after they failed reconcile, committed suicide by taking a fatal dose of sleeping pills, on 12 December 1942, at the Dorchester Hotel.

His second marriage was to Enid Maude, Viscountess Furness (1892–1973), widow of Marmaduke Furness, 1st Viscount Furness, and daughter of Charles Lindeman. An Australian wine heiress, she was previously married to, and widowed by, Roderick Cameron Sr. and Brig. Gen. Frederick W.L.S.H. Cavendish. They married in 1943. By this marriage Lord Castlerosse had three stepchildren: Roderick Cameron Jr., Patricia Enid Cavendish, and Frederick C.P. Cavendish, 7th Baron Waterpark.

Lord Kenmare died in September 1943 aged 52 and was buried in the family vault in Killarney Cathedral. As he had no male issue, his titles passed to his younger brother, Gerald Browne. Upon the latter's death in 1952, the titles became extinct.

Peerage of Ireland
Preceded by Valentine Browne	Earl of Kenmare; 1941–1943	Succeeded by Gerald Browne
