= Art on Paper =

Art magazine

Art on Paper was a bi-monthly art magazine published from 1996 to 2009. The magazine's editorial scope included limited-edition prints and artists' books, drawings, photographs, and ephemera.

== History ==
The magazine was founded in New York City in 1970 as The Print Collectors Newsletter by Paul Cummings, with Judith Goldman as editor. Within a year, Cummings sold it to Jacqueline Brody, who continued to publish it until 1996.

Art on Paper ceased publication in December 2009, having lost 60% of its advertising base in the Great Recession.
