= Viscount Furness =

Extinct viscountcy in the Peerage of the United Kingdom

Viscount Furness, of Grantley in the West Riding of the County of York, was a title in the Peerage of the United Kingdom. It was created in 1918 for the shipping magnate Marmaduke Furness, 2nd Baron Furness. The title Baron Furness, of Grantley in the West Riding of the County of York, had been bestowed on his father, Christopher Furness, a businessman and Liberal politician. The titles became extinct in 1995 on the death of the first Viscount's only surviving son, William, the second Viscount.

Thelma Furness, Viscountess Furness, second wife of the first Viscount, was an American-born socialite. The Honourable Christopher Furness, only son of the first Viscount by his first wife, was a recipient of the Victoria Cross. Sir Stephen Furness, 1st Baronet, was the nephew of the first Baron.

== Barons Furness (1910) ==
- Christopher Furness, 1st Baron Furness (1852–1912)
- Marmaduke Furness, 2nd Baron Furness (1883–1940) (created Viscount Furness in 1918)

== Viscounts Furness (1918) ==
- Marmaduke Furness, 1st Viscount Furness (1883–1940)
  - Hon. Christopher Furness (1912–1940)
- William Anthony Furness, 2nd Viscount Furness (1929–1995)

== Arms ==
Coat of arms of Viscount Furness
Crest Issuant from a chaplet of cinquefoils Vert a bear's paw erect Argent grasping a javelin in bend sinister Sable pendent therefrom by the straps two spurs Or. Escutcheon Or a talbot sejant Sable in chief three fountains Proper. Supporters On either side a sea dog reguardant Proper gutte d'eau. Motto I'll Defend

== See also ==
- Furness baronets
