= Walter Hoving =

American businessman and writer

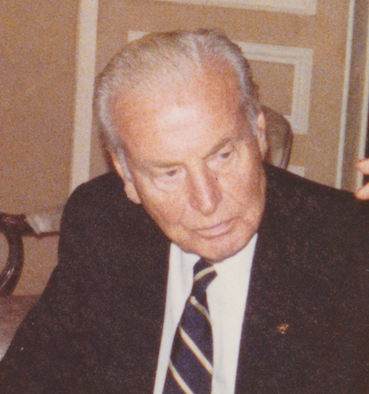
- Born: December 2, 1897; Stockholm, Sweden
- Died: November 27, 1989 (aged 91); Newport, Rhode Island, U.S.
- Education: De Witt Clinton High School
- Alma mater: Brown University
- Occupations: Former chairman, Tiffany & Company
- Spouses: Mary Osgood Field (m. 1924; div. 1936) Pauline Vandervoort Rogers (m. 1937; died 1976) Jane Pickens Langley (m. 1977)
- Children: 2, including Thomas Hoving

Walter Hoving (December 2, 1897 – November 27, 1989) was a Swedish-born American businessman and writer. He was the chairman of Tiffany & Company from 1955 to 1980.

== Early life ==
Hoving was born in Stockholm on December 2, 1897. He was a son of Johannes Hoving, a surgeon, and Helga (née Adamsen) Hoving, an opera singer. His brother was the dentist, Dr. Hannes Hoving. In 1931, his father, who planned the Jenny Lind centennial memorial celebration, was decorated by King Gustaf V of Sweden with the Royal Order of the Northern Star, 1st class, as well as the Cross of the Royal Order of the House of Vasa.

In 1903, he moved to United States with his parents. He completed his school education at the Barnard School and De Witt Clinton High School in New York City. In the year 1920, Hoving received his bachelor's degree from Brown University, where he was a member of the Upsilon chapter of the Delta Kappa Epsilon fraternity.

== Career ==
He started working in 1924, at R. H. Macy & Company and became vice-president at the age of 30. He studied arts at Metropolitan Museum for four years to enhance his knowledge of painting, textile design and furniture. In the year, 1932 he joined Montgomery Ward & Company as vice-president in charge of sales where he worked for four years. In 1936, he joined Lord & Taylor, and worked as the president of the firm until 1946.

Hoving founded the Hoving Corporation in 1946, which included Bonwit Teller until he sold it in 1960.

=== Tiffany & Company ===
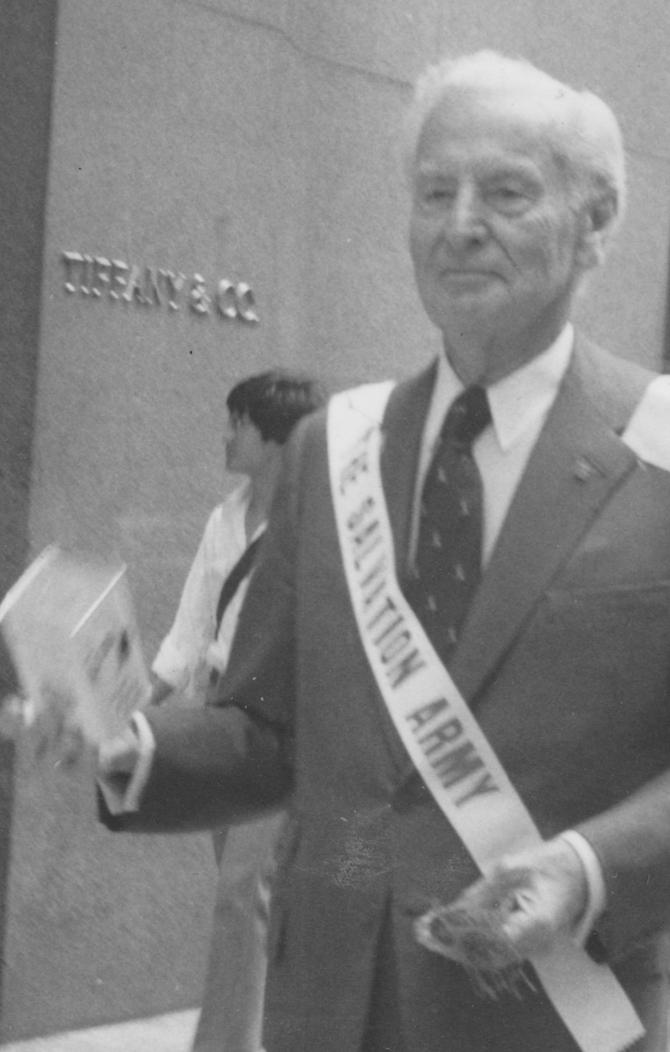
Hoving at Tiffany & Co.

Hoving bought a controlling share of Tiffany & Co. in 1955, at that time company's performance appeared to be gradually declining with around $7 million worth of business a year. Under his supervision, company's sales grew up to $100 million by the year 1980.

He hired Van Day Truex, a design director and allowed him to design freely without worrying about selling it. He also hired famous designers like Jean Schlumberger, Elsa Peretti, and Gene Moore. Moore went on to design Tiffany's famous Fifth Avenue windows.

Hoving maintained standards at Tiffany & Co. by refusing to sell diamond rings to men, nothing silver plated and no account charged for customers who had been impolite towards the salespeople.

=== Sales to John F. Kennedy ===
Hoving made two sales to President John F. Kennedy. Once in 1960, Hoving met then President-elect, after store hours, and assisted him in selecting a brooch by Jean Schlumberger with rubies and diamonds for Jacqueline Kennedy. The Metropolitan Museum of Art displayed the brooch in the exhibition Jacqueline Kennedy: The White House Years.

Kennedy contacted Hoving again in 1962 and requested thirty two Lucite calendar mementos for his assistants who helped him during the Cuban Missile Crisis. Hoving's responded with the gist that they don't sell plastic. However, Tiffany's provided mementos to Kennedy made of silver.

=== Later years ===
Avon Products, Inc. acquired Tiffany & Company in 1979. Hoving resigned following year and started his own consulting firm that specialized in retail design and management and started work on his memoirs that were never published. He also focused his efforts on his philanthropic activities and stayed at his home in Newport, Rhode Island. He contacted David Mitchell then Chairman of Avon offering to purchase back Tiffany & Company, but his offers were never seriously entertained. Henry B. Platt took over Tiffany & Company as the chairman after Hoving's resignation but was fired five months later on the grounds of incompetency.

In an interview for The New York Times, Angela Cummings stated: At Tiffany's I met Walter Hoving, she recalled, and he looked at the little portfolio I had and said, You want to work for us, go ahead and try. It was like a threat, but at the time I didn't even know who he was.

== Personal life ==
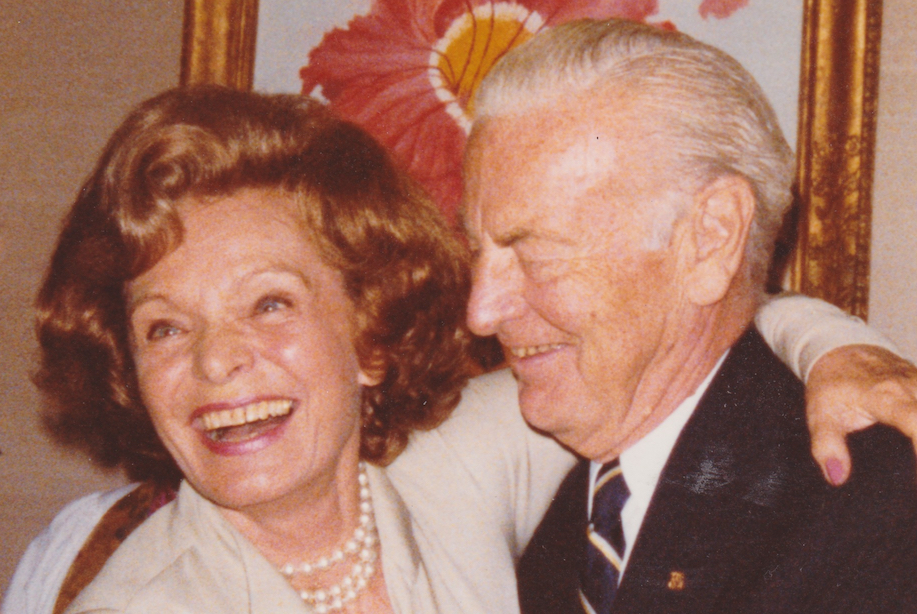
Hoving with Jane Pickens Langley

In 1924, Hoving married Mary Osgood Field (1901–1955), the daughter of Thomas Pearsall Field and Emma Beadleston. Mary was a direct descendant of Samuel Osgood, the first Postmaster General of the United States. Before their divorce in 1936, they were the parents of:

- Petrea Field Hoving (1928–2016), who married Harry "Buddy" Durand in 1954.
- Thomas Pearsall Field Hoving (1931–2009), who served as the director of the Metropolitan Museum of Art from 1967 to 1977.

In 1937, he became the fourth husband of the former Pauline Vandervoort (1889–1976). Her first husband, John Steese, had died; her second husband, Carl Kirsch Dresser, divorced in 1927; and her third husband, Col. Henry Huddleston Rogers Jr. (a son of Standard Oil millionaire Henry Huddleston Rogers), whom she married in 1933, died in Southampton in 1935. After a long illness, Pauline died in 1976.

He married former singer Jane Pickens Langley (1907–1992) in 1977, and their marriage lasted until his death. Langley owned the designed by Ogden Codman Berkley Villa on Bellevue Avenue in Newport, Rhode Island.

He died at Newport Hospital in Newport at the age of 91 on November 27, 1989. He was survived by a son, daughter, and four grandchildren, John Hoving, Samuel Osgood Hoving, Thomas Durand and Petrea Hoving.

=== Philanthropy and legacy ===
Hoving was also the founder of Walter Hoving Home, a rehabilitation center for women with drug addiction and alcoholism. He was a co-founder of the Salvation Army Association of New York, and gave his time to the United Negro College Fund and the United Service Organizations, USO.

== Books ==
- Tiffany's Table Manners for Teen-agers (Random House, 1960)
- Your Career in Business (Tiffany & Co., 1978)
