= Roderick Cameron (businessman) =

Canadian-American businessman (1825–1900)

Sir Roderick Cameron
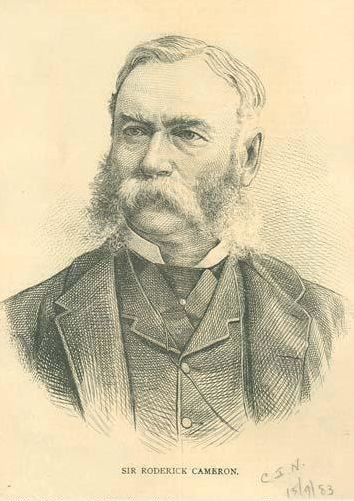
- R. W. Cameron in 1883
- Born: Roderick William Cameron; July 25, 1825; Glengarry County, Upper Canada
- Died: October 19, 1900 (aged 75); London, England
- Resting place: Williamstown, Ontario, Canada
- Occupations: Businessman, statesman, racehorse owner/breeder
- Board member of: R. W. Cameron & Co.
- Spouses: Mary Ann Cummings (m. 1845; died 1859) Anne Fleming Leavenworth (m. 1860; died 1879)
- Children: Margaret; Duncan; Roderick; Catherine; Alice; Anne; Isabell
- Parent(s): Duncan Cameron; Margaret MacLeod
- Relatives: Rory Cameron (grandson)
- Honors: Knight Bachelor (1883)

Sir Roderick William Cameron (July 25, 1825 – October 19, 1900) was a Canadian and American businessman noted for co-founding the R. W. Cameron and Company shipping line in New York City, as well as for his role as an official representative of Canada and Australia at several international exhibitions during the 1870s and 1880s.

== Early life ==
Cameron was born in Glengarry County, Upper Canada on July 25, 1825 to Duncan Cameron (c. 1764–1848), a prominent fur trader with the North West Company who represented Glengarry in the Upper Canadian House of Assembly during the 9th Parliament, and Margaret MacLeod.

His paternal grandparents were Alexander Cameron and Margaret (née McDonell) Cameron. His father, along with his grandparents, immigrated to Tryon County, New York in 1773. In 1785, following the Revolutionary War, the Loyalist Camerons moved to Williamstown, Ontario in Canada.

He was tutored in Williamstown by Dr. John Rae and later at the district school at Kingston.

== Career ==
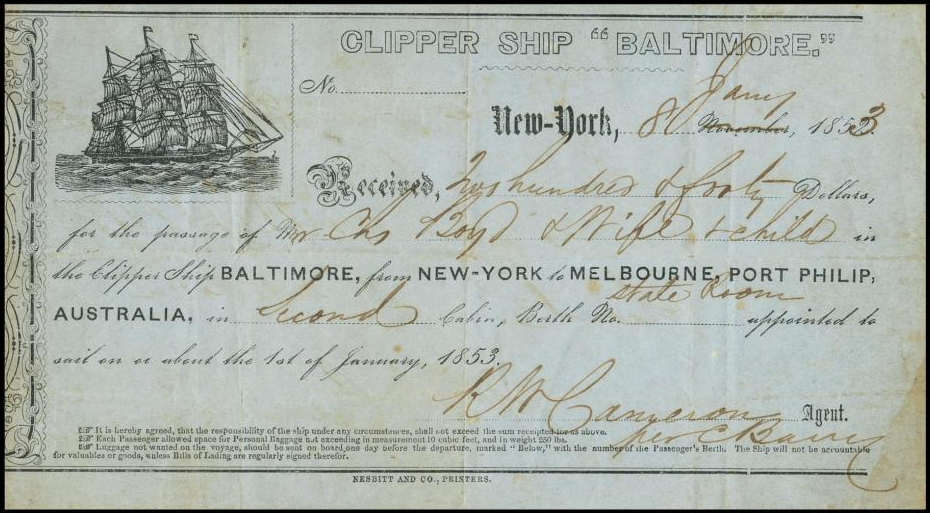
A Passenger ticket for the Australian Pioneer Line clipper ship Baltimore from New York to Melbourne 1853, issued by R.W. Cameron from his offices at 116 Wall Street, New York

From 1839 to 1847, he was in business in Hamilton, Ontario, working as a clerk in a dry-goods business.

In 1852, during the Australian gold rushes, Cameron chartered a ship to take supplies and passengers from New York to Australia. Shortly thereafter, he added more ships and consolidated his business into a shipping company known as the Australian Pioneer Line. In 1870, he took on William Augustus Street as his partner, and the firm became known as R. W. Cameron and Company. The company maintained success during the Panic of 1857, the American Civil War, and the boom of the Clipper. Cameron generally focused on trade routes between New York and Australia, linking with New Zealand, England, and certain areas in Asia, transporting kerosene and farm machinery as well as Australian wool. By the end of the 1800s, the company no longer owned ships, instead they chartered them, leaving risk elsewhere.

=== Thoroughbred racing ===
Roderick Cameron owned a 130-acre (0.53 km^{2}) estate, which he named Clifton Berley, in Rosebank, Staten Island. There, he established a stud farm which, according to his New York Times obituary, was "one of the most noted in the country." For his horse breeding operation, Cameron imported a number of stallions and broodmares from England, notably Leamington, the sire of Iroquois, which in 1881 became the first American horse to win England's prestigious Epsom Derby and St. Leger Stakes. Among the horses bred at Clifton Stud was Glenelg, the 1869 Travers Stakes winner and a four-time Leading sire in North America.

The Canadian government recommended a Knighthood that was formally bestowed on Cameron on June 16, 1883.

=== Society life ===
Cameron, although he never renounced his British citizenship, was prominent in New York and Newport society. In 1892, he was included in Ward McAllister's "Four Hundred", purported to be an index of New York's best families, published in The New York Times. Conveniently, 400 was the number of people that could fit into Mrs. Astor's ballroom.

He was a member of the Knickerbocker Club, Metropolitan Club, New York Yacht Club, and Down Town Association.

== Personal life ==
On August 6, 1845, he married Mary Ann Cumming, the daughter of George Cumming of Quebec. She died in 1858; they had no children together.

In July 1860, Cameron was married to Anne Fleming Leavenworth (1840–1879), the daughter of Nathan Leavenworth of New York. Together, they were the parents of two sons and five daughters, including:

- Margaret Selina Ewen Cameron (1862–1919), who was presented at the British Court in May 1883. She later lived at 1706 18th Street in Washington, D.C. in a home designed by Jules Henri de Sibour.
- Duncan Ewen Cameron (1866–1927), who married Mary Glowacki Turnure (b. 1863), the daughter of Lawrence Turnure. After her death, he married Mrs. Mary Crampton Welsh. After their divorce, he married Mrs. Elsie Howland Quinby, in 1926.
- Roderick MacLeod Cameron (1868–1914), who became a member of the Union Club of the City of New York in 1889. In 1913, he married Australian wine heiress Enid Maude Lindeman (1892–1973), daughter of Charles Lindeman. After his death, she married Brig. Gen. Frederick William Cavendish, Marmaduke Furness, 1st Viscount Furness, and Valentine Browne, 6th Earl of Kenmare.
- Catherine Natalie Cameron (1870–1923), who married Judah Howes Sears, the son of Zenas Sears of Boston, in 1912. She died a few years later and he remarried to Mrs. Nona Newlin Hooper in 1925.
- Alice Cameron (1871–1880), who died shortly after his wife.
- Anne Fleming Cameron (1873–1961), who married Belmont Tiffany (1871–1952), a son of George and Isabella Perry Tiffany and grandson of Comm. Matthew Calbraith Perry, in June 1895.
- Isabell Dorothy Cameron (d. 1906), who died unmarried.

In New York City, Cameron lived at 149 Second Avenue, in Staten Island, he lived at Rosebank, where he had Frederick Law Olmsted design his gardens, and in Canada, he has a home in Tadoussac, Quebec, which had been owned by the former Governor General of Canada, the Marquess of Dufferin and Ava.

In declining health, Roderick Cameron was visiting England when he died on October 19, 1900, at the Hyde Park Hotel. His body was returned to New York where funeral services were held before being sent to Williamstown, Ontario, Canada for burial. His estate was worth approximately $250,000 upon his death. The estate in Staten Island was inherited by his second son, Roderick MacLeaod Cameron.

=== Descendants ===
Through his son Roderick, he was the grandfather of Roderick "Rory" William Cameron (1914–1985), an American travel writer who was a contributing editor of L'Oeil.

In January 1921, his granddaughter, the debutante Mary Cameron, was given a dance for 600 people at the home of Edith Kingdon Gould, the wife of George J. Gould, at 857 Fifth Avenue. In May 1921, she was married to Juan R. Mayer, the son of Charles W. Mayer, at St. Thomas's Church in New York.
