= Furnes =

Furnes may refer to:

== People ==
- Kjell Furnes (born 1936), a Norwegian politician

== Places ==
=== Belgium ===
- Furnes, Belgium, the French name for the city of Veurne in West Flanders
- Canal de Furnes, the French part of Nieuwpoort–Dunkirk Canal that connects Dunkirk to Veurne, Belgium

=== Norway ===
- Furnes, Norway, a village in Ringsaker Municipality in Innlandet county
- Furnes Municipality, a former municipality in the old Hedmark county
- Furnes Church, a church in Ringsaker Municipality in Innlandet county

== Other ==
- Battle of Furnes, a battle in 1297 between French and Flemish forces
- Furnes Fotball, an association football club in Ringsaker, Norway
- Furnes SF, a skiing club in Ringsaker, Norway

== See also ==
- Furness (disambiguation)
