= Gene Moore (window dresser) =

American designer and window dresser

- Born: June 10, 1910; Birmingham, Alabama, US
- Died: November 23, 1998 (aged 88); New York City, US

Gene Moore (June 10, 1910 – November 23, 1998) was an American designer and window dresser. Moore joined Tiffany & Company in 1955, as its Artistic Director and Vice President. He was also the Art Director of Bonwit Teller and gave Andy Warhol some of his first work as a window dresser.

== Biography ==
Gene Moore is often cited as pioneer in the history of American design and a vital figure in the creation of the brand image of jewelry powerhouse Tiffany & Co. Historian Mark C. Taylor has described Moore as one of the "most important twentieth-century window designers in the United States".

Moore was also the photographer behind one of the best-known portrait sittings of actress Audrey Hepburn, in 1952. The photo session was made by Moore originally with the intent to be the basis for modeling his new mannequin design for Bonwit Teller. Hepburn was later reunited with Moore in the opening sequence of the 1960 film Breakfast at Tiffany's, appearing as the iconic Holly Golightly sipping morning coffee in front of his windows at the Tiffany & Co. flagship store.

Working at Tiffany's, Moore designed approximately 5,000 windows, many of which featured his collection of stuffed hummingbirds. He was also noted for using concepts or actual works of modern art in his windows, including those of Robert Rauschenberg, Jasper Johns, Alexander Ney and Andy Warhol.

== Legacy ==
In 1997, Moore donated much of his archives to the Cooper-Hewitt National Design Museum, Smithsonian Institution. The collection was transferred to the Archives Center at the National Museum of American History in 2012.

His work was the subject of the 1996 exhibition Moon Over Pearls, Gene Moore's Tiffany Windows and Beyond held at The Museum at the Fashion Institute of Technology in New York City.

== Bibliography ==
- Windows at Tiffany's: The Art of Gene Moore. With Judith Goldman. NY: Harry N. Abrams, 1980.
- My Time at Tiffany's. Gene Moore with Jay Hyams. NY: St. Martin's Press, 1990.
