= Marmaduke Furness, 1st Viscount Furness =

British businessman

The Right Honourable The Viscount Furness
- Born: 29 October 1883; West Hartlepool, Durham, England
- Died: 6 October 1940 (aged 56); London, England
- Spouses: Ada "Daisy" Hogg (died 1921) Thelma Morgan Converse (m. 1926; div. 1933) Enid Cavendish (m. 1933)
- Children: Hon. Averill Rattray; Hon. Christopher Furness; William Anthony Furness, 2nd Viscount Furness
- Father: Christopher Furness

Marmaduke Furness, 1st Viscount Furness (29 October 1883 – 6 October 1940) was a British shipping magnate and during his lifetime one of the richest men in the world.

== Early life ==
Furness was born on 29 October 1883 at West Hartlepool, Durham, England. He was the son of Christopher Furness, 1st Baron Furness and Jane Annette Suggit.

His father was the seventh son of John Furness of West Hartlepool, and Averill Eastor Furness (née Wilson). His mother was the only daughter of Henry Suggitt of Brierton, County Durham.

== Career ==
He served as Chairman of Furness Withy, the shipbuilding firm, and was also involved in the steel and iron business. He succeeded his father as 2nd Baron Furness in 1912, and in 1918 was created Viscount Furness, of Grantley in the West Riding of the County of Yorkshire. In November 1929, he was reported as being Laird of the Glen Affric Estate in the Scottish Highlands. After his father's death, when in London he lived at 21 Grosvenor Square until 1933 when he moved his London residence to Lees Place, also in Mayfair.

== Personal life ==
Lord Furness was married three times. His first marriage was to Ada "Daisy" Hogg, daughter of an English businessman, G. J. H. Hogg of Seaton Carew. She was heavily involved in the Red Cross during World War I. She died on 28 February 1921, aboard the Furness yacht Sapphire off the coast of Portugal, while recovering from an operation and was buried at sea. She and Lord Furness had two children:

- Hon. Averill Furness (1908–1936), who married Andrew Rattray in 1932; he died in 1933.
- Hon. Christopher Furness, VC (1912–1940)

=== Second marriage ===
Lord Furness married secondly, in 1926, Thelma Morgan Converse, the former Mrs James Vail Converse and a daughter of Harry Hays Morgan Sr., an American diplomat. They divorced in 1933 as a result of Lady Furness's affairs with Aly Khan and Edward, Prince of Wales (later Edward VIII). They had one son:

- William Anthony Furness, 2nd Viscount Furness, aka Tony (1929–1995)

In June 1921, Lord Furness was engaged to Julie Thompson (née Julie Francis Eleanor Phillips, died 15 April 1967), an American socialite and former wife of stockbroker George Lee Thompson. She had previously turned down offers of marriage by other nobles including Grand Duke Nicholas of Russia and his cousin Grand Duke Alexander Michaelovitch. The engagement was broken off.

=== Third marriage ===
Furness's third and final marriage was to Enid Cavendish (née Lindeman), the Australia-born widow of Brig. Gen. Frederick Cavendish; she was also the widow of Roderick Cameron. She and Lord Furness were married in 1933. By this marriage he had three stepchildren: Roderick "Rory" William Cameron (1914–1985), Patricia Enid Cavendish (1925–2019) and Frederick Caryll Philip Cavendish, 7th Baron Waterpark (1926–2013).

Lord Furness died on 6 October 1940, aged 56, 5 months after his son Christopher was killed in the Battle of Arras. He was succeeded by his younger and only surviving son, Tony, as second viscount.

== Arms ==
Coat of arms of Marmaduke Furness, 1st Viscount Furness
Crest Issuant from a chaplet of cinquefoils Vert a bear's paw erect Argent grasping a javelin in bend sinister Sable pendent therefrom by the straps two spurs Or. Escutcheon Or a talbot sejant Sable in chief three fountains Proper. Supporters On either side a sea dog reguardant Proper gutte d'eau. Motto I'll Defend

Peerage of the United Kingdom
New creation	Viscount Furness; 1918–1940	Succeeded by William Furness
Preceded by Christopher Furness	Baron Furness; 1912–1940	Succeeded by William Furness
