= Diamond Cut Diamond (film) =

1932 British film by Maurice Elvey and Fred Niblo

- Italian poster
- Directed by: Maurice Elvey; Fred Niblo
- Written by: Viscount Castlerosse
- Produced by: Eric Hakim
- Starring: Adolphe Menjou; Claud Allister; Benita Hume
- Production company: Cinema House
- Distributed by: Metro-Goldwyn-Mayer
- Release date: 26 August 1932
- Running time: 71 minutes
- Country: United Kingdom
- Language: English

Diamond Cut Diamond (also known as Blame the Woman) is a 1932 British comedy crime film directed by Maurice Elvey and Fred Niblo and starring Adolphe Menjou, Claud Allister and Benita Hume. It was written by Viscount Castlerosse, and was made at Elstree Studios by the independent producer Eric Hakim.

== Preservation status ==
The British Film Institute National Archive holds a collection of ephemera and stills but no film or video materials.

== Plot ==
One of the guests tries to foil a gang of jewel-robbers during a country house weekend party.

== Cast ==
- Adolphe Menjou as Dan McQueen
- Claud Allister as Joe Fragson
- Benita Hume as Marda Blackett
- Kenneth Kove as Reggie Dean
- Desmond Jeans as Blackett
- G.D. Manetta as head waiter
- Roland Gillett as cloak room attendant
- Toni Edgar-Bruce as Miss Loftus
- Shayle Gardner as Spellman

== Reception ==
Film Weekly wrote: "Patchy direction, feeble dialogue, and disjointed direction prevent the film from being nearly as good as it should have been, but there are two amusing performances by Adolphe Menjou and Claude Allister."

Picture Show wrote: "The excellent acting of Adolphe Menjou, Claude Allister, Benita Hume and Kenneth Kove make this quite good film entertainment, although it must be said that the action of the story drags somewhat painfully at times."
