= Alexander Ney =

Soviet-born American sculptor and painter (born 1939)

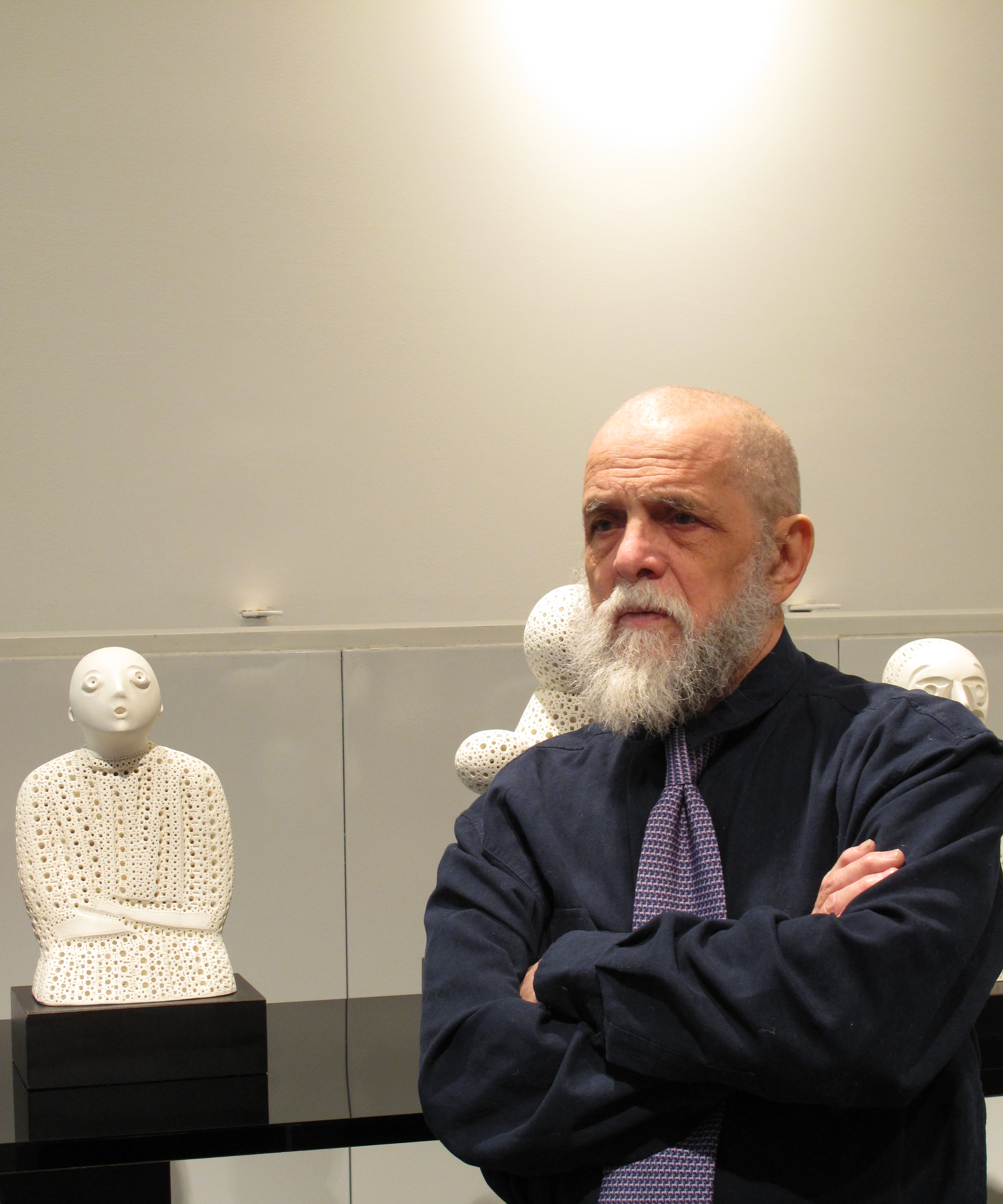
- Alexander Ney in 2008, pictured with his sculpture "Singing Girl".
- Born: September 1939 (age 86–87); Leningrad, Russian SFSR, Soviet Union
- Education: Russian Academy of Arts; Repin Institute of Arts; Moscow Surikov State Academic Institute of Fine Arts
- Known for: Mixed Mediasculpting; painting
- Notable work: 'Burning Bush'; 'The Thinker'
- Patrons: Gene Moore, Elaine de Kooning

Alexander Ney (Russian: Александр Ней; born September 1939) is a Russian-American sculptor and painter. After establishing himself in 1972 as a resident of France, he immigrated to the United States in 1974 and has since lived and worked in New York City. Developing several individualistic styles in modern art, he is known for his work in terra cotta sculpture, which features heavily perforated surfaces.

== Early life and education ==
Born in September 1939, at the outbreak of World War II, Ney's early childhood was marked by hardship. Two weeks before Ney turned 2, the Siege of Leningrad launched, described by historians as the second most lethal battle in the war's history. The pivotal city’s rail connections were severed, cutting off all access to any food and power supplies. In the following winters that ensued, between two and three million civilians—including 400,000 children—died during the Leningrad Blockade.

After being given private art lessons at the home of influential Russian sculptor V.V. Lishev (1877–1960), from 1954 to 1957 Ney studied at the Art School of the Leningrad Academy of Arts, and later at the Art School of the Moscow Surikov State Academic Institute of Fine Arts from 1957 to 1959. Ney befriended a wide number of progressive-minded art students, now stars of the contemporary Russian art scene such as Alexander Kosolapov, Leonid Sokov, Alexander Yulikov, Lev Nussberg and Vadim Kosmatschof. His work in creating new interpretations of art gained recognition among his peers. Artists Alexander Kosolapov and Igor Makarevich, amongst others, recall that Ney played an influential role in their early years.

== Career ==
From 1965 to 1967, Ney taught sculpture to children at the House of Young Pioneers in Leningrad. Students included future Russian novelist Sergei Dovlatov (1941–1990).

In 1967 through 1969, Ney attended art history and theory courses at the Ilya Repin Institute. He continued to develop his skills as both a painter and sculptor, as well as an art theoretician.

Due to his highly productive creative output's clashing with the Soviet mandates of Socialist Realism, Ney absconded to France in 1972 on a tourist visa, as immigration was not permitted. His was granted residencies and established studios in the famed art colonies of both Cité internationale des arts in Paris and Villa Arson in Nice. In 1974, at the encouragement of American Abstract Expressionist painter Elaine de Kooning (wife of Willem), he immigrated with his family to the United States.

One of the first of several noted cultural figures whose early departure inadvertently signaled the start of a new wave of American immigrants from the Soviet Union, American designer Gene Moore discovered Ney's work at a chance meeting at The Russian Tea Room. As the longtime Vice President of the flagship landmark location of Tiffany & Co. on Fifth Avenue and 57th Street, having displayed the works of contemporary artists Robert Rauschenberg, Jasper Johns, James Rosenquist and Andy Warhol, Moore created displays featuring Ney's works annually since 1978 for over thirty years.

On May 29, 1997, a 4-alarm rooftop fire apparently caused by a neighboring commercial building descended into Ney's two-floor home and studio located in Manhattan's Diamond District, destroying thousands of artwork.

In 2009, the National Centre for Contemporary Arts (NCCA) in Moscow held a special anniversary exhibition to honor the artist's 70th anniversary. NYC Mayor Michael Bloomberg wrote in the accompanying publication's introductory foreword:

″Throughout his career, Mr. Ney has made an indelible impact on the creative life of our City and beyond—building a diverse and unique range of work that has inspired and moved individuals from around the world. What’s more, Mr. Ney’s success demonstrates the boundless potential of the New York immigrant experience, and his hard work and perseverance set a wonderful example for us all. On behalf of the City of New York, I applaud Mr. Ney for his tremendous achievements and invaluable contributions to the cultural life of our City.″

== Public collections ==
Notable collections of Ney’s sculptures, paintings and drawings are held at:

- Museum Beelden aan Zee, containing the largest collection of international sculpture in the Netherlands
- The State Russian Museum, St. Petersburg, Russia
- The State Tretyakov Gallery, Moscow, Russia
- The State Pushkin Museum of Fine Arts, Moscow, Russia
- The Moscow Museum of Modern Art, Moscow, Russia
- The National Centre for Contemporary Arts, Moscow, Russia
- The ART4.RU Museum of Contemporary Russian Art, Moscow, Russia
- The Jane Voorhees Zimmerli Art Museum at Rutgers University, USA
- The Nasher Museum of Art at Duke University, USA
- The Yeshiva University Museum, New York, USA
- The Mead Art Museum, Massachusetts, USA
- The McMullen Museum of Art, Massachusetts, USA
