= William Anthony Furness, 2nd Viscount Furness =

British peer (1929–1995)

The Right Honourable The Viscount Furness
- Hereditary Peerage
- In office 1950 – 1 May 1995

Personal details
- Born: 31 March 1929 Melton Mowbray, Leicestershire, England
- Died: 1 May 1995 (aged 66) London, England
- Party: Crossbencher
- Parents: Marmaduke Furness, 1st Viscount Furness; Thelma Morgan
- Education: Downside School

William Anthony Furness, 2nd Viscount Furness (31 March 1929 – 1 May 1995) was a British peer. He was the producer and financier of many West End plays, and an active member of the Royal Central Asian Society. He was also a knight of the Sovereign Military Order of Malta.

== Early life ==
Furness was born in Melton Mowbray, England, the only child of Marmaduke Furness, 1st Viscount Furness, and his second wife, Thelma Furness, Viscountess Furness (formerly Converse, née Morgan), an American socialite and mistress of King Edward VIII while he was still the Prince of Wales. He was the grandson of Christopher Furness, 1st Baron Furness, of Furness Withy Shipping, and a first cousin of the American fashion designer Gloria Vanderbilt.

Tony Furness, as he was known, was educated in England at Downside School and in America. He succeeded to the title in 1940 on the death of his father, his half brother Christopher Furness having been killed in action earlier that year at Arras whilst serving with the Welsh Guards for which Christopher Furness was awarded a posthumous Victoria Cross.

== House of Lords ==
When Lord Furness came of age, he decided to enter the House of Lords and to take up his responsibilities as second viscount, rather than to live in America, his mother's home country. In the House he served on a series of committees and was, for many years, a mainstay of the Inter Parliamentary Union. In the Lords he sponsored a bill to allow flight passengers the right to a drink out of hours having passed customs.

== The theatre ==
In addition to his parliamentary duties he also ran Furness Enterprises from his grandfather's offices at 60 St James's Street, which gave him easy access to his favourite clubs. In the fifties and sixties he was a theatrical producer or "angel", his preferred term, most particularly with the actor Alan Badel, with whom he ran Furndel Productions, based at the Westminster Theatre. Of these productions probably the 1959 production of Ulysses in Nighttown, directed by Burgess Meredith, which transferred from New York and ran in London and later in Paris, and James Saunders' The Ark were the most prestigious; although Furndel productions also mounted the London production of Gore Vidal’s Visit to a Small Planet. When his partnership with Alan Badel ended, he continued to work as a producer, most particularly through his financing of Jeremy Brett's Hamlet, and a memorable production of Heartbreak House at Wyndham's Theatre, with Roger Livesey as Captain Shotover.

During these years Lord Furness also had business ventures in America, with his old California school friend Larry Spector, later to be involved in music management and the financing and production of Easy Rider.

== Mongolia ==
For many years Lord Furness was an active member of the Royal Central Asian Society, now the Royal Society for Asian Affairs. His theatrical and Central Asian interests culminated in his visit to Mongolia in 1960, in an attempt to bring the Mongolian National Opera to London. And although this did not succeed, due largely to difficulties made by the Soviet government of the day, this interest did lead to the founding of The Anglo-Mongolian Society in 1963.

== Sovereign Military Order of Malta ==
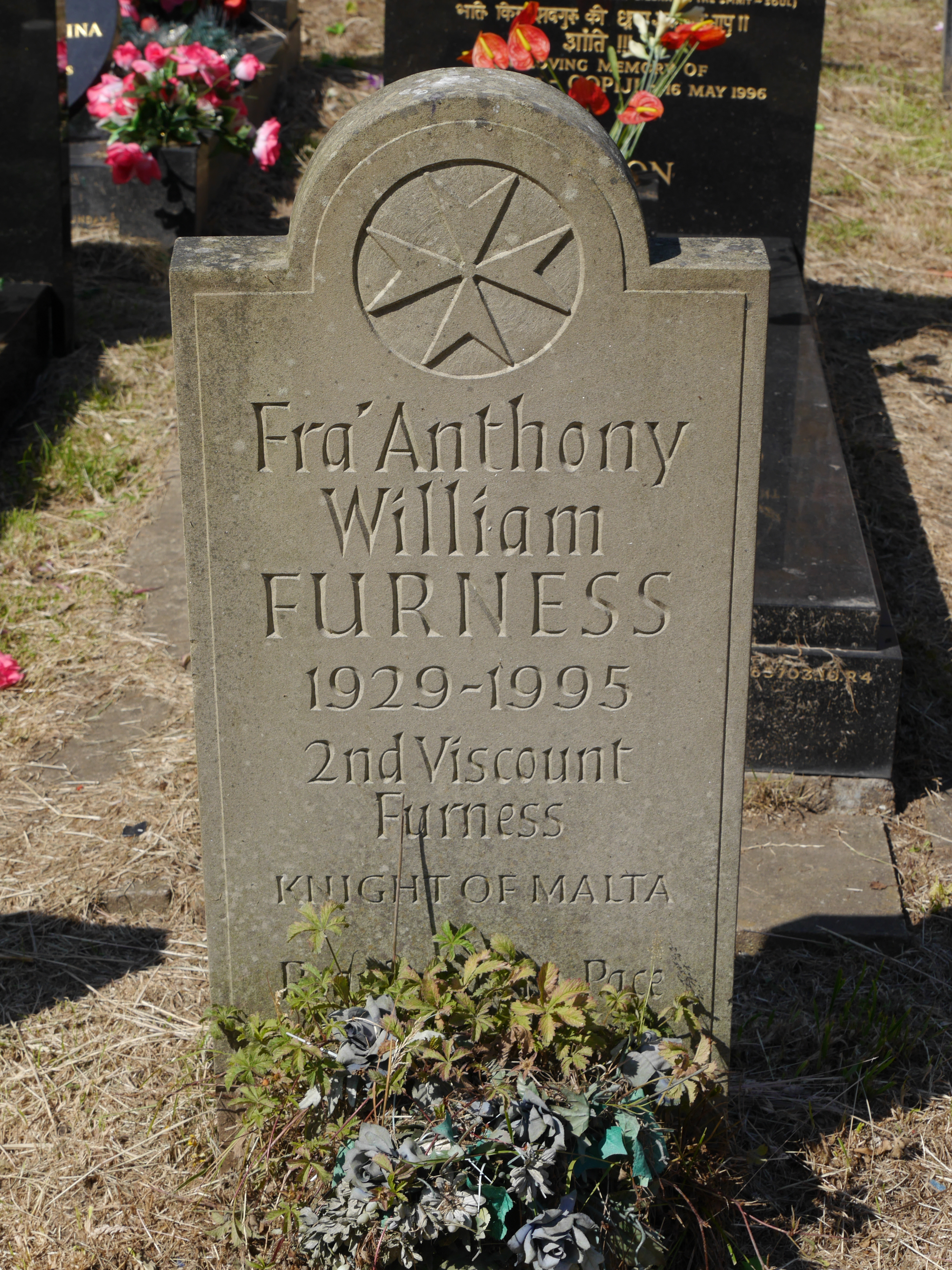
Grave stone of Furness, Kensal Green Cemetery, London, with Maltese Cross referring to his position as a knight of the Sovereign Military Order of Malta.

In addition to his work in business and in the theatre, Lord Furness was, from his early adult life, a knight of the Sovereign Military Order of Malta. The Catholic Church was an extremely important part of his life, thus his work for the order was something he took very seriously. Eventually he became one of the first two English Professed Knights of the Order since the reformation, the other being the late grandmaster of the Order of Malta, HMEH Fra Andrew Bertie.

On becoming a professed knight Lord Furness focused all his efforts on working for the Order and left England to reside in Martigny, as a tax exile. He spent much time in Geneva, Switzerland, where he maintained an office.

== Death ==
He died in the Order's Hospice of St John and St Elizabeth in London on 1 May 1995. Since he did not marry and had no children—according to an obituary, he took a vow of celibacy upon being rejected by the only woman he ever asked to marry him, Joyce Reeves—both titles became extinct.

== Arms ==
Coat of arms of William Anthony Furness, 2nd Viscount Furness
Crest Issuant from a chaplet of cinquefoils Vert a bear's paw erect Argent grasping a javelin in bend sinister Sable pendent therefrom by the straps two spurs Or. Escutcheon Or a talbot sejant Sable in chief three fountains Proper. Supporters On either side a sea dog reguardant Proper gutte d'eau. Motto I'll Defend

== References and sources ==
Sources

- Double Exposure, A Twin Autobiography. Thelma Furness and Gloria Vanderbilt. Frederick Muller Ltd (1959)
- Monuments to Courage. David Harvey. Navy and Military Press Ltd (2000) ISBN 1843423561
- Obituary Viscount Furness from: The Independent, London 12 May 1995, by Richard Fawkes

Peerage of the United Kingdom
Preceded by Marmaduke Furness	Viscount Furness; 1940–1995	Extinct
