= Roderick Cameron (traveler) =

American travel writer (1913–1985)

Rory Cameron

Roderick William ("Rory") Cameron (1913 – 18 September 1985) was an American travel writer. He wrote a number of travel books and also contributed to Life and Horizon magazines. For several years he was contributing editor of L'Oeil.

== Early life ==
Cameron was born in 1913, the son of Roderick M. Cameron, who had married an Australian, Enid Lindeman, who by a later marriage to Valentine Browne, 6th Earl of Kenmare became Countess of Kenmare in Ireland. His grandfather was Sir Roderick Cameron, shipping magnate who founded R. W. Cameron & Company in New York.

He was educated at private schools in England and Switzerland, and later at the Courtauld Institute of Art.

== Career ==
He worked for the Office of Strategic Services during World War II and spent much time in London.

He had no need to work, having inherited wealth, but produced a number of travel books and works of history. He also contributed to Life and Horizon magazines and for several years was contributing editor of L'Oeil. Apart from writing, his principal interest was interior design.

== Personal life ==
Cameron was bisexual and had relationships with men and women. He never married and had no children.

Cameron died of AIDS-related illnesses at his home in Menerbes, France, on 18 September 1985. He was survived by a half-brother, Lord Waterpark of London, and a half-sister, Patricia O'Neill of Cape Province, South Africa.

== Selected publications ==
- My travel's history. Hamish Hamilton, London, 1950.
- Equator farm: An account of the author's visits to Kenya, Uganda and Zanzibar. William Heinemann, London, 1955.
- Shadows from India. An architectural album &c. William Heinemann, London, 1958.
- Time of the mango flowers. Heinemann, London, 1958.
- Shells. Weidenfeld & Nicolson, London, 1961.
- The golden haze: With Captain Cook in the South Pacific. Weidenfeld & Nicolson, London, 1964.
- Viceroyalties of the west: The Spanish Empire in Latin America. Weidenfeld & Nicolson, London, 1968. ISBN 0297762060
- Australia: History and horizons. Weidenfeld and Nicolson, London, 1971. ISBN 0297001280
- The golden Riviera. Weidenfeld and Nicolson, London, 1975. ISBN 0297769308

== See also ==
- Van Day Truex, Cameron's close friend.
