= Jean Schlumberger (jewelry designer) =

Jewelry designer

- Born: Jean Michel Schlumberger; June 24, 1907; Mulhouse, Alsace, German Empire
- Died: August 29, 1987 (aged 80); Paris, France
- Resting place: Isola di San Michele, Venice, Italy
- Occupation: Jewellery designer
- Years active: 1930s–1970s
- Employer: Tiffany & Co.
- Known for: Whimsical natural-form jewellery; mounting for the Tiffany Yellow Diamond ("Bird on a Rock")
- Partner: Lucien "Luc" Bouchage
- Awards: Coty Award (1958); Ordre national du Mérite (Chevalier, 1977)

Jean Michel Schlumberger (June 24, 1907 – August 29, 1987) was a French jewellery designer especially well known for his work at Tiffany & Co.

== Family and early life ==
Schlumberger was born in then-German Mulhouse, France, to a well-to-do family involved in textile manufacturing. His father was Paul Albert Edouard Schlumberger (1877–1952) and his mother was Elisabeth Schoen (1884–1942). He had four siblings; Daniel Schlumberger (1904–1972), Pascal Alfred (1911–1986), Isabelle Françoise Elisabeth and Jacqueline. He sketched constantly during his youth, although his parents tried to discourage his artistic interest by refusing to allow him to undertake formal training.

Schlumberger began his career creating buttons for Elsa Schiaparelli in the 1930s. Schiaparelli later commissioned him to design costume jewelry for her firm.

During World War II, Schlumberger was an officer in the French Army and survived the Battle of Dunkirk. He also served under General Charles de Gaulle in England and Syria and Lebanon with the Free French Forces.

After the war, Schlumberger came to New York and began to design clothing for Chez Ninon.

In 1946, he opened a jewelry salon with his business partner Nicolas Bongard (1908–2000).

Also, during the war Schlumberger met Lucien “Luc” Bouchage, a photographer who would become his life partner.

== Career at Tiffany & Co. ==
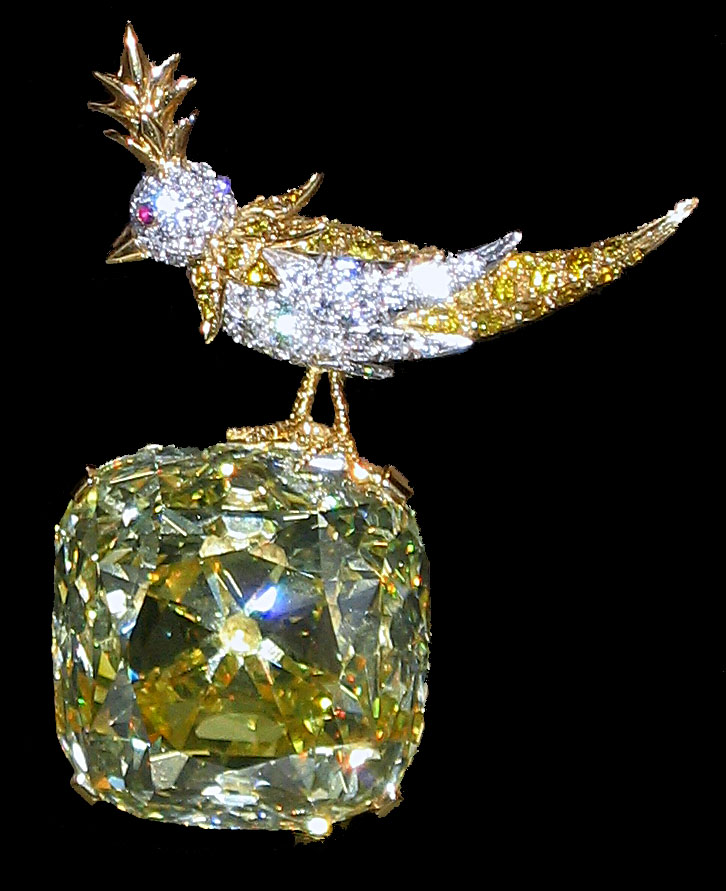
The brooch "Bird on a Rock" with the famous Tiffany Yellow Diamond.

In 1956, the president of Tiffany & Co., Walter Hoving, asked Schlumberger to begin designing for the firm. He had his own workshop at the company until his retirement in the late 1970s and was eventually made a Vice-President.

Schlumberger's designs at Tiffany & Co. were known for their whimsical interpretations of natural forms. He was especially inspired by sea creatures and other animals. Diana Vreeland wrote that Schlumberger "appreciates the miracle of jewels. For him, they are the ways and means to the realization of his dreams."

He built an client base to include the Duchess of Windsor, Babe Paley, Greta Garbo, Mona von Bismarck, Rachel Lambert Mellon, Jayne Wrightsman, C.Z. Guest, Gloria Guinness, Françoise de Langlade, Princess Marina, Duchess of Kent, Shirley Allen Marston, Lyn Revson, Gloria Vanderbilt, Elizabeth Taylor and Audrey Hepburn.

For his wife, Jacqueline, John F. Kennedy purchased the Two Fruit clip in rubies and diamonds, which is in the permanent collection of the John F. Kennedy Presidential Library and Museum. Jacqueline Kennedy wore so many of Schlumberger's bracelets that the press dubbed them "Jackie bracelets".

Schlumberger remains one of only four jewelers Tiffany & Co. ever allowed to sign their work: the others are Paloma Picasso, Elsa Peretti and Frank Gehry.

Schlumberger was a very private person but liked to socialize among friends like Cristóbal Balenciaga, Emilio Terry, Diana Vreeland and Hubert de Givenchy.

Schlumberger died in Paris aged 80 and is buried at Isola di San Michele.

== Tiffany Yellow Diamond ==
One of the most famous pieces Schlumberger ever created was the mounting for the Tiffany Diamond, which was in the firm's collection since the nineteenth century. The brooch, entitled "Bird on a Rock", incorporates the 128.54 carats (25.708 g) yellow diamond in a fanciful setting typical of Schlumberger's style.

== Awards ==
He was the first jewelry designer to win the coveted Fashion Critics’ Coty Award in 1958.

In 1977, the French Government made him a Knight / Chevalier of Ordre national du Mérite.
