= Thelma Furness, Viscountess Furness =

20th-century noblewoman and royal mistress (1904–1970)

Thelma Furness
- Viscountess Furness
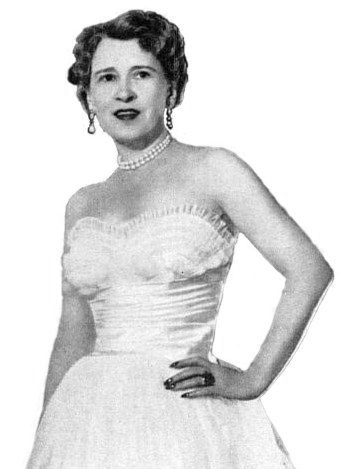
- Lady Furness in 1955
- Born: Thelma Morgan; 23 August 1904; Grand Hotel National, Lucerne, Switzerland
- Died: 29 January 1970 (aged 65); Manhattan, New York, U.S.
- Buried: Holy Cross Cemetery, Culver City, California
- Spouses: James Vail Converse (m. 1922; div. 1925) Marmaduke Furness, 1st Viscount Furness (m. 1926; div. 1933)
- Issue: William Anthony Furness, 2nd Viscount Furness
- Father: Harry Hays Morgan Sr.
- Mother: Laura Delphine Kilpatrick

Thelma Furness, Viscountess Furness (née Morgan, 23 August 1904 – 29 January 1970), was a mistress of Edward VIII while he was Prince of Wales. She was supplanted in his affections by Wallis Simpson, for whose sake Edward abdicated, becoming the Duke of Windsor. She was the maternal aunt of the writer, fashion designer, and socialite Gloria Vanderbilt.

During most of Furness's relationship with the Prince of Wales, she was married to British nobleman Marmaduke Furness, 1st Viscount Furness. They married in 1926 and divorced in 1933, the year before Thelma's relationship with the Prince of Wales ended.

Furness's first name was pronounced in Spanish fashion as "TEL-ma".

== Early life ==
Born in Lucerne, Switzerland, Thelma Morgan was a daughter of Harry Hays Morgan Sr. (1860–1933), an American diplomat who was U.S. consul in Buenos Aires and in Brussels, and his half-Chilean, half-Irish-American wife, Laura Delphine Kilpatrick (1869–1956). Married in 1893, they were divorced in 1927.

Morgan's maternal grandfather was a Union general, Hugh Judson Kilpatrick (1836–1881), who was also U.S. minister to Chile. Through her maternal grandmother Luisa Fernandez de Valdivieso (1836–1926), a niece of Archbishop of Santiago Crescente Errázuriz Valdivieso, she reportedly was a descendant of Spain's Royal House of Navarre.

Thelma Morgan had two sisters: Gloria (her identical twin, the mother of Gloria Vanderbilt, the fashion designer, artist and mother of news anchor Anderson Cooper) and Laura Consuelo Morgan (aka Tamar), who was married to three men in succession: Count Jean de Maupas du Juglart (a French nobleman); Benjamin Thaw Jr. of Pittsburgh; and Alfons B. Landa, president of Colonial Airlines and vice-chairman of the finance committee of the Democratic National Committee in 1948. Thelma Morgan also had a brother, Harry Hays Morgan Jr., who became a diplomat and then a minor Hollywood actor in such films as Abie's Irish Rose (1946) and Joan of Arc (1948). Her half-siblings, from her father's first marriage to Mary E. Edgerton, were Constance Morgan (1887–1892) and Gladys "Margaret" Morgan (1889–1958).

== Film career ==
For a very brief time, Furness was a motion picture producer and actress, after founding Thelma Morgan Pictures in 1923. As she told Time magazine, "I am incorporating the Thelma Morgan Pictures, Inc., with $100,000 capital and will produce big, sane, and sound 'specials.' I will be my own star. Hitherto, my chief experience has been in Junior League shows." Her first starring role, in 1923, was the lead in a film Aphrodite, produced by her own company and filmed at Vitagraph Studios.

Furness described her leading role in Aphrodite to The New York Times as that of "an American girl, brought up under the sinister influence of an old Egyptian woman." She also had small parts in the films Enemies of Women (1923), a William Randolph Hearst production whose cast included Lionel Barrymore and Clara Bow, So This Is Marriage? (1924), and Any Woman (1925).

== Marriages and relationships ==
Morgan's first husband was James Vail Converse (1893–1947), a grandson of Theodore N. Vail, former president of the American Telephone and Telegraph Company (AT&T). They were married in Washington, D.C., on 16 February 1922 when she was 17 years old; Converse was about a decade older and had been married before. They divorced in Los Angeles, California, on 10 April 1925. By this marriage she had one stepson, James Vail Converse Jr. (born 18 January 1918), her husband's son from his first marriage to Nadine Melbourne.

After the divorce, Morgan was rumored to be engaged to the American actor Richard Bennett, the matinée-idol father of Hollywood film stars Constance Bennett, Joan Bennett, and Barbara Bennett.

Morgan's second husband was Marmaduke Furness, 1st Viscount Furness (1883–1940), the chairman of Furness Shipping Company. She was his second wife. They were married on 27 June 1926, and divorced in 1933. They had one son, William Anthony Furness, 2nd Viscount Furness, and as the former wife of a British nobleman she was known as Thelma, Viscountess Furness. By this marriage she also had a stepson, Christopher Furness, and a stepdaughter, Averill Furness.

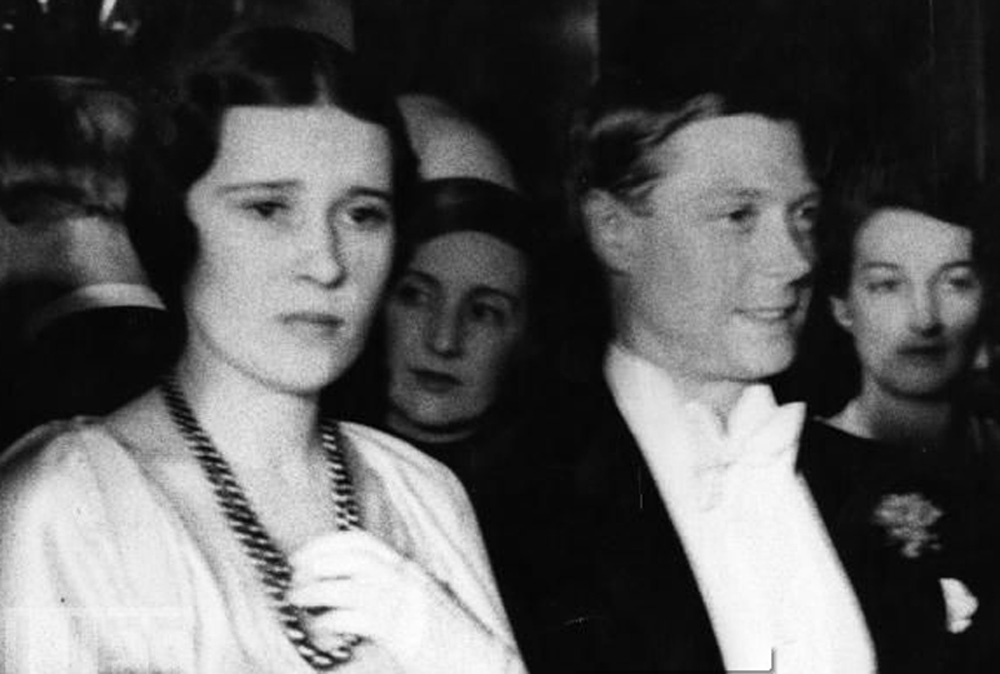
Furness and Edward, the Prince of Wales, in 1932

Furness first met the Prince of Wales at a ball at Londonderry House in 1926 but they did not meet again until the Leicestershire Agricultural Show at Leicester on 14 June 1929. Edward asked her to dine and they met regularly until she joined him on safari in East Africa early in 1930, when a closer relationship developed. On Edward's return to Britain in April 1930 she was his regular weekend companion at the newly acquired Fort Belvedere until January 1934. She also entertained him at her London home, in Elsworthy Road, Primrose Hill, and the Furness country house, Burrough Court, in Leicestershire.

On 10 January 1931 at her country house Burrough Court, near Melton Mowbray, Furness introduced the prince to her close friend Wallis Simpson and, while visiting her sister Gloria in America between January and March 1934, she was supplanted in the Prince's affection by Simpson. Reacting to Edward's coldness later that year she threw herself into a short-lived affair with Prince Aly Khan. She had openly flirted with Khan during her voyage back to the UK in March 1934 which was reported to the Prince of Wales and widely reported in the British and American press including the social gossip magazine Tatler. While Furness was in the US with Aly Khan, Wallis Simpson stayed in her Mayfair home, 22 Farm Street, and entertained the Prince of Wales there.

Furness' identical twin sister was Gloria Morgan Vanderbilt, who was married to Reginald Vanderbilt and had a daughter, Gloria Vanderbilt. This makes her a maternal great-aunt of CNN anchor Anderson Cooper.

== Final years ==
Furness and her sister Gloria wrote a memoir called Double Exposure (1959).

Furness died in New York City on 29 January 1970. As her niece, Gloria Vanderbilt, recalled, "She dropped dead on Seventy-third and Lexington on her way to see the doctor. In her bag was this miniature teddy bear that the Prince of Wales had given her, years before, when she came to be with my mother at the custody trial, and it was worn down to the nub".

Furness was buried next to her twin sister, Gloria, in Holy Cross Cemetery in Culver City, California.
