= Judith Goldman =

- Born: United States
- Education: Bard College
- Occupations: Writer, independent curator and publisher.

Judith Goldman is a writer, curator and publisher who lives in New York City.

== Early life ==
Born in Chicago, Goldman attended Bard College, where she majored in literature and studied woodcut with Louis Schanker; she briefly attended the Institute of Design in Chicago, where she studied etching with Misch Kohn.

== Career ==
Beginning her career as an editor, Goldman was managing editor of Artist’s Proof (1966–69); founding editor of The Print Collector’s Newsletter (1969–1973; and managing editor of ARTnews (1973–1975) . From 1977 to 1991, she was advisor and then curator of prints at the Whitney Museum of American Art, where exhibitions she organized included: “New York on Paper” (1977); “Jasper Johns, Foirades/Fizzles”; (1977); “American Prints, Process & Proofs” (1981) and “Frank Stella, A Print Retrospective”, 1982. As an independent curator, she has organized : “Rosenquist, The Early Pictures” (Gagosian Gallery 1992); “Frank Stella, A Painting Retrospective” ( Reina Sofia, Madrid 1995); “The Pop Image, Print & Multiples” (Marlborough Gallery, New York, 1994);” Frankenthaler, The Woodcuts” (Naples Museum of Art, 2002)”; “The Painted Sculpture of Betty Parsons” (Naples Museum of Art, 2005); “Robert and Ethel Scull, Portrait of a Collection” (Acquavella Galleries 2010); “Phoenix, Xu Bing at the Cathedral,” (Cathedral of St. John the Divine, 2014–15); “James Rosenquist, His American Life,” Acquavella Galleries 2018). In 1999, she established the Blue Heron Press (with Paul Kasmin) which has published etchings and lithographs by Walton Ford and Elliott Puckette. That same year, she established Deuce II Editions to publish artists’ books and prints.

== Books and publications ==
She is the author of Windows at Tiffany: The Art of Gene Moore (Abrams, 1980); American Prints: Process & Proofs, (Harper & Row), 1981;Jasper Johns, 17 Monotypes (ULAE, 1981);Jasper Johns: Prints 1977 – 1981 (Thomas Segal Gallery, 1981); James Rosenquist (Viking, 1985); James Rosenquist, The Early Pictures (Rizzoli 1992); The Pop Image: Prints & Multiples, 1994); Helen Frankenthaler, The Woodcuts, (George Brazillier 2002); Robert & Ethel Scull, Portrait of a Collection ( 2010). Her essays have appeared in The Village Voice, New York Daily News, Vogue, Art in America, The Art Journal, Print Quarterly and ARTnews. In 2014, Deuce II Editions published Xu Bing's four-panel lithograph The Suzhou Landscripts (2003-2013).

== Awards ==
Art Critics Fellowship, National Endowment for the Arts, 1978
