= Christopher Furness (VC) =

British Army Officer

Lieutenant The Honourable Christopher Furness VC
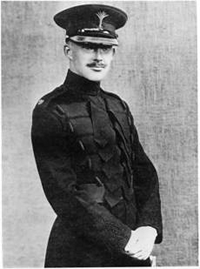
- Born: 17 May 1912; London, England
- Died: 24 May 1940 (aged 28); Arras, France
- Relatives: Marmaduke Furness, 1st Viscount Furness, (father); Christopher Furness, 1st Baron Furness, (grandfather)
- Military career
- Allegiance: United Kingdom
- Branch: British Army
- Rank: Lieutenant
- Service number: 53422
- Units: Welsh Guards
- Conflicts: Second World War: Western Front; French and Low Countries campaign; Battle of France; Battle of Arras †
- Awards: Victoria Cross

Lieutenant Christopher Furness VC (17 May 1912 – 24 May 1940) was a British Army officer and an English recipient of the Victoria Cross (VC), the highest award for gallantry in the face of the enemy that can be awarded to British and Commonwealth forces.

== Early life ==
Furness was born in London on 17 May 1912, the eldest son and heir (in his lifetime) of The Honourable Marmaduke Furness (later the 1st Viscount Furness) and his first wife Ada "Daisy" (née Hogg). Christopher Furness was educated at Eton College.

== VC action ==
Furness was 28 years old, and a lieutenant in the 1st Battalion, Welsh Guards, British Army during the Second World War Battle of France when the following deed took place for which he was awarded the VC.

During the period 17–24 May 1940 near Arras, France, Lieutenant Furness commanded the Carrier Platoon when his battalion formed part of the garrison of the town.

On 23 May the platoon was ordered to cover the withdrawal of the transport (over 40 vehicles) to Douai. Early on 24 May the enemy were advancing along the road where the transport columns were moving and Lieutenant Furness decided to attack. He reached the enemy position under heavy fire and when the light tanks and all the carriers and their crews had become casualties he engaged the enemy in hand-to-hand combat until he was killed.

His fight against hopeless odds made the enemy withdraw temporarily and enabled the vehicles and survivors to get clear.

== The medal ==
His Victoria Cross, still owned by the Furness family, is loaned to and displayed at The Guards Regimental Headquarters (Welsh Guards RHQ), Wellington Barracks, London.

== Commemoration ==
Furness is commemorated on the Dunkirk Memorial.
