= Stockton-on-Tees Borough Council elections =

Local government elections in Stockton-on-Tees, England

Stockton-on-Tees Borough Council elections are held every four years. Stockton-on-Tees Borough Council is the local authority for the unitary authority of Stockton-on-Tees, which straddles the ceremonial counties of County Durham and North Yorkshire, England. Until 1 April 1996 it was a non-metropolitan district in Cleveland.

== Council elections ==
=== Non-metropolitan district elections ===
- 1973 Stockton-on-Tees Borough Council election
- 1976 Stockton-on-Tees Borough Council election
- 1979 Stockton-on-Tees Borough Council election (New ward boundaries)
- 1983 Stockton-on-Tees Borough Council election (Borough boundary changes took place but the number of seats remained the same)
- 1987 Stockton-on-Tees Borough Council election
- 1991 Stockton-on-Tees Borough Council election (Borough boundary changes took place but the number of seats remained the same)

=== Unitary authority elections ===
- 1995 Stockton-on-Tees Borough Council election
- 1999 Stockton-on-Tees Borough Council election
- 2003 Stockton-on-Tees Borough Council election
- 2005 Stockton-on-Tees Borough Council election (New ward boundaries increased the number of seats by 1)
- 2007 Stockton-on-Tees Borough Council election
- 2011 Stockton-on-Tees Borough Council election
- 2015 Stockton-on-Tees Borough Council election
- 2019 Stockton-on-Tees Borough Council election
- 2023 Stockton-on-Tees Borough Council election (New ward boundaries)

== Results maps ==
2003 results map

2005 results map

2007 results map

2011 results map

2015 results map

2019 results map

2023 results map

== Council composition ==
| Year | Labour | Conservative | Liberal Democrats | Thornaby Independent Association | Ingleby Barwick Independents Society | Billingham Independents Association | Independent | Council control after election |
|---|---|---|---|---|---|---|---|---|
| 2003 | 28 | 13 | 6 | 8 | 0 | 0 | 0 | Labour |
| 2005 | 28 | 12 | 7 | 3 | 6 | 0 | 0 | Labour |
| 2007 | 22 | 13 | 8 | 7 | 6 | 0 | 0 | No overall control |
| 2011 | 27 | 12 | 4 | 5 | 6 | 2 | 0 | No overall control |
| 2015 | 32 | 13 | 1 | 3 | 5 | 0 | 2 | Labour |
| 2019 | 24 | 14 | 2 | 7 | 3 | 0 | 6 | No overall control |
| 2023 | 22 | 26 | 0 | 4 | 3 | 0 | 1 | No overall control |

== By-election results ==
=== 1995–1999 ===
Blue Hall By-Election 1 May 1997
| Party | Candidate | Votes | % | ±% |
|---|---|---|---|---|
| Labour | Ann Hatton | 1,620 | 64.4 | −18.0 |
| Liberal Democrats | Joan Hodgson | 536 | 21.3 | +12.2 |
| Conservative | Phyllis Scott | 358 | 14.2 | +5.6 |
| Majority | | 1,084 | 43.1 | |
| Turnout | | 2,514 | 60.1 | |
| Labour hold | | Swing | | |

Parkfield By-Election 24 September 1998
| Party | Candidate | Votes | % | ±% |
|---|---|---|---|---|
| Labour | Chris Coombs | 583 | 58.0 | −19.4 |
| Independent | Alex Bain | 196 | 19.5 | +19.5 |
| Conservative | Mark Daley | 143 | 14.2 | +1.5 |
| Liberal Democrats | Jonathan Wylie | 61 | 6.1 | −3.8 |
| Socialist | Patrick Graham | 23 | 2.3 | +2.3 |
| Majority | | 387 | 38.5 | |
| Turnout | | 1,006 | 22.2 | |
| Labour hold | | Swing | | |

=== 1999–2003 ===
Fairfield By-Election 7 June 2001
| Party | Candidate | Votes | % | ±% |
|---|---|---|---|---|
| Conservative | | 1,056 | 42.6 | −12.0 |
| Labour | | 971 | 39.2 | +3.8 |
| Liberal Democrats | | 340 | 13.7 | +3.7 |
| Independent | | 91 | 3.7 | +3.7 |
| Socialist Alliance | | 20 | 0.8 | +0.8 |
| Majority | | 85 | 3.4 | |
| Turnout | | 2,478 | | |
| Conservative hold | | Swing | | |

Marsh House By-Election 19 July 2001
| Party | Candidate | Votes | % | ±% |
|---|---|---|---|---|
| Liberal Democrats | Jennifer Apedaile | 886 | 56.6 | +4.5 |
| Labour | Sidney Thompson | 555 | 35.5 | −12.4 |
| Conservative | John Thomson | 123 | 7.9 | +7.9 |
| Majority | | 331 | 21.1 | |
| Turnout | | 1,564 | 25.0 | |
| Liberal Democrats hold | | Swing | | |

Marsh House By-Election 16 May 2002
| Party | Candidate | Votes | % | ±% |
|---|---|---|---|---|
| Liberal Democrats | Colin Leckonby | 1,169 | 67.1 | +10.5 |
| Labour | Royce Sandbach | 405 | 23.3 | −12.2 |
| Conservative | Graham Moore | 96 | 5.5 | −2.4 |
| Socialist | Anne Hollifield | 71 | 4.1 | +4.1 |
| Majority | | 764 | 43.8 | |
| Turnout | | 1,741 | 28.3 | |
| Liberal Democrats gain from Labour | | Swing | | |

Charltons By-Election 18 July 2002
| Party | Candidate | Votes | % | ±% |
|---|---|---|---|---|
| Labour | Raymond McCall | 420 | 61.9 | −12.6 |
| Liberal Democrats | | 132 | 19.5 | +3.7 |
| Green | | 65 | 9.6 | +9.6 |
| Conservative | | 61 | 9.0 | −0.7 |
| Majority | | 288 | 42.4 | |
| Turnout | | 678 | 19.4 | |
| Labour hold | | Swing | | |

=== 2005–2007 ===
Hartburn By-Election 9 February 2006
| Party | Candidate | Votes | % | ±% |
|---|---|---|---|---|
| Conservative | Terence Laing | 1,396 | 78.1 | +12.3 |
| Labour | Joseph Rayner | 277 | 15.5 | −6.1 |
| Liberal Democrats | David Hamilton-Milburn | 115 | 6.4 | −6.3 |
| Majority | | 1,119 | 62.6 | |
| Turnout | | 1,788 | 32.6 | |
| Conservative hold | | Swing | | |

=== 2007–2011 ===
Ingleby Barwick West By-Election 18 June 2009
| Party | Candidate | Votes | % | ±% |
|---|---|---|---|---|
| Ingleby Barwick Ind Society | Jean Kirby | 1,011 | 62.7 | −16.4 |
| Conservative | Kelvin Mirfin | 303 | 18.8 | +6.9 |
| Labour | Peter McCarrick | 163 | 10.1 | +1.1 |
| UKIP | Stuart Smitheringale | 82 | 5.1 | +5.1 |
| Liberal Democrats | Irene Machin | 54 | 3.3 | +3.3 |
| Majority | | 708 | 43.9 | |
| Turnout | | 1,613 | 22.2 | |
| Independent hold | | Swing | | |

=== 2011–2015 ===
Village By-Election 7 February 2013
| Party | Candidate | Votes | % | ±% |
|---|---|---|---|---|
| Thornaby Independent Association | Mick MOORE | 800 | 61.2 | +8.1 |
| Labour | Leslie HODGE | 270 | 20.6 | −11.6 |
| UKIP | Ted STRIKE | 135 | 10.3 | +10.3 |
| Conservative | John CHAPMAN | 85 | 6.5 | −5.3 |
| Liberal Democrats | Isabel WILLIS | 18 | 1.4 | −1.5 |
| Majority | | 530 | | |
| Turnout | | | | |
| Independent hold | | Swing | 9.9 | |

=== 2015–2019 ===
Parkfield & Oxbridge By-Election 28 January 2016
| Party | Candidate | Votes | % | ±% |
|---|---|---|---|---|
| Labour | Allan Mitchell | 598 | 52.5 | +6.7 |
| Conservative | Stephen Richardson | 363 | 31.9 | +4.8 |
| UKIP | Peter Braney | 113 | 9.9 | +9.9 |
| Liberal Democrats | Drew Durning | 65 | 5.7 | +0.2 |
| Majority | | 235 | 20.6 | |
| Turnout | | 1,139 | 21.9 | |
| Labour hold | | Swing | | |

Grangefield By-Election 1 September 2016
| Party | Candidate | Votes | % | ±% |
|---|---|---|---|---|
| Conservative | Stephen Richardson | 807 | 50.5 | +15.4 |
| Labour | Eleanor Clark | 689 | 43.1 | −5.5 |
| UKIP | Daniel Dalton | 58 | 3.6 | −8.8 |
| Liberal Democrats | Nick Webb | 44 | 2.8 | −1.1 |
| Majority | | 118 | 7.4 | |
| Turnout | | 1,598 | 30.8 | |
| Conservative gain from Labour | | Swing | | |

Newtown By-Election 18 May 2017
| Party | Candidate | Votes | % | ±% |
|---|---|---|---|---|
| Labour | Marilyn Surtees | 483 | 52.5 | |
| Conservative | Miguel Rodrigues | 201 | 21.8 | |
| (no description) | David Kirk | 193 | 21.0 | |
| Liberal Democrats | Jason Rossiter | 43 | 4.7 | |
| Majority | | 282 | 30.7 | |
| Turnout | | 920 | 19.0 | |
| Labour hold | | Swing | | |

Yarm By-Election 22 June 2017
| Party | Candidate | Votes | % | ±% |
|---|---|---|---|---|
| Conservative | Tony Hampton | 1,179 | 50.8 | |
| Independent | Andrew Sherris | 677 | 29.1 | |
| Labour | Kevin Nicholas | 394 | 17.0 | |
| Liberal Democrats | Graham Robinson | 73 | 3.1 | |
| Majority | | 502 | 21.6 | |
| Turnout | | 2,323 | 30.2 | |
| Conservative hold | | Swing | | |

Billingham North By-Election 20 July 2017
| Party | Candidate | Votes | % | ±% |
|---|---|---|---|---|
| Labour | Paul Weston | 719 | 40.5 | +5.4 |
| Conservative | Sam Linley | 687 | 38.7 | +19.1 |
| Independent | Jennifer Apedaile | 196 | 11.0 | n/a |
| Liberal Democrats | David Minchella | 95 | 5.3 | n/a |
| North East | Mark Burdon | 80 | 4.5 | n/a |
| Majority | | 32 | 1.8 | |
| Turnout | | 1,777 | 25.4 | |
| Labour hold | | Swing | | |

Parkfield & Oxbridge By-Election 23 November 2017
| Party | Candidate | Votes | % | ±% |
|---|---|---|---|---|
| Labour Co-op | Louise Baldock | 727 | 54.7 | +2.2 |
| Conservative | Aidan Cockerill | 409 | 30.8 | −1.1 |
| Independent | Shakeel Noor | 156 | 11.7 | n/a |
| Liberal Democrats | Drew Durning | 37 | 2.8 | −2.9 |
| Majority | | 318 | 23.9 | |
| Turnout | | 1,329 | 24.2 | |
| Labour hold | | Swing | | |

=== 2019–2023 ===
Billingham West By-Election 6 May 2021
| Party | Candidate | Votes | % | ±% |
|---|---|---|---|---|
| Conservative | Lee Spence | 863 | 39.6 | +11.3 |
| Independent | Mark Bellerby | 791 | 36.3 | +36.3 |
| Labour | Paul Jenkins | 429 | 19.7 | −1.2 |
| Reform | John McDermottroe | 53 | 2.4 | +2.4 |
| Independent | Paul Henderson | 32 | 1.5 | +1.5 |
| Liberal Democrats | Raymond Penn | 7 | 0.3 | +0.3 |
| Independent | Giles Harris | 4 | 0.2 | +0.2 |
| Majority | | 72 | 3.3 | |
| Turnout | | 2,179 | | |
| Conservative gain from Independent | | Swing | | |

Bishopsgarth and Elm Tree By-Election 6 May 2021
| Party | Candidate | Votes | % | ±% |
|---|---|---|---|---|
| Conservative | Hugo Stratton | 1,055 | 45.2 | +28.4 |
| Liberal Democrats | Matthew Eves | 730 | 31.3 | −14.4 |
| Labour | Ben Lamb | 386 | 16.5 | −3.6 |
| Independent | Craig Harker | 165 | 7.1 | +7.1 |
| Majority | | 325 | 13.9 | |
| Turnout | | 2,336 | | |
| Conservative gain from Liberal Democrats | | Swing | | |

Hartburn By-Election 6 May 2021
| Party | Candidate | Votes | % | ±% |
|---|---|---|---|---|
| Conservative | Niall Innes | 1,999 | 73.2 | +4.6 |
| Labour | Shakeel Hussain | 620 | 22.7 | +4.6 |
| Reform | Michael Elliott | 112 | 4.1 | +4.1 |
| Majority | | 1,379 | 50.5 | |
| Turnout | | 2,731 | | |
| Conservative hold | | Swing | | |

Western Parishes By-Election 6 May 2021
| Party | Candidate | Votes | % | ±% |
|---|---|---|---|---|
| Conservative | Steve Matthews | 928 | 65.1 | +9.4 |
| Labour | Stephen Thompson | 362 | 25.4 | −0.8 |
| Independent | Andrew Stephenson | 136 | 9.5 | −46.2 |
| Majority | | 566 | 39.7 | |
| Turnout | | 1,426 | | |
| Conservative hold | | Swing | | |

Andrew Stephenson was the incumbent councillor, having been disqualified due to non-attendance.

Yarm By-Election 6 May 2021
| Party | Candidate | Votes | % | ±% |
|---|---|---|---|---|
| Conservative | Dan Fagan | 2,757 | 62.0 | +26.4 |
| Independent | Alan Gallafant | 759 | 17.1 | +17.1 |
| Labour | Gail Chandler | 644 | 14.5 | −2.9 |
| Independent | Tony Bell-Berry | 149 | 3.4 | +3.4 |
| Liberal Democrats | Adam Kearney | 76 | 1.7 | +1.7 |
| Independent | Christopher Johnson | 59 | 1.3 | +1.3 |
| Majority | | 1,998 | 45.0 | |
| Turnout | | 4,444 | | |
| Conservative hold | | Swing | | |

=== 2023–2027 ===
Fairfield By-Election 19 September 2024 (2 seats)
| Party | Candidate | Votes | % | ±% |
|---|---|---|---|---|
| Conservative | Jack Miller | 1,291 | | |
| Conservative | Mohammed Mazi | 1,181 | | |
| Labour | Stephen Jennings | 528 | | |
| Labour | Oli Hall | 496 | | |
| Reform | Neil McCabe | 344 | | |
| Reform | Steve Matthews | 304 | | |
| Independent | Charlton Gibben | 110 | | |
| Green | Samuel Bradford | 62 | | |
| Liberal Democrats | Mo Waqas | 45 | | |
| Liberal Democrats | Hadia Malik | 43 | | |
| Independent | William Bell-Berry | 11 | | |
| Conservative hold | | Swing | | |
| Conservative hold | | Swing | | |

Eaglescliffe West By-Election 11 December 2025
| Party | Candidate | Votes | % | ±% |
|---|---|---|---|---|
| Conservative | Stephen Dodds | 1,194 | 60.9 | |
| Reform | Rick Macdonald | 470 | 24.0 | |
| Green | Danny Reed | 150 | 7.6 | |
| Labour | Frank Saul | 147 | 7.5 | |
| Majority | | 724 | 36.9 | |
| Turnout | | 1,961 | | |
| Conservative hold | | Swing | | |
