= 2019 Stockton-on-Tees Borough Council election =

2019 UK local government election

Results of the 2019 Stockton-on-Tees Borough Council election

The 2019 Stockton-on-Tees Borough Council election took place on 2 May 2019 to elect members of the Stockton-on-Tees Borough Council in England. It was held on the same day as other local elections.

== Results summary ==
2019 Stockton-on-Tees Borough Council election
Party	Seats	Gains	Losses	Net gain/loss	Seats %	Votes %	Votes	+/−
Labour	24			▼8	42.9	32.6	29,355	
Conservative	14			▲1	25.0	33.2	29,864	
Thornaby Independent Association	7			▲4	12.5	7.6	6,856	
Independent	6			▲4	10.7	9.1	8,224	
Ingleby Barwick Independent Society	3			▼2	5.4	7.1	6,376	
Liberal Democrats	2			▲1	3.6	3.8	3,422	
UKIP	0			0	0.0	4.8	4,278	
North East	0			0	0.0	0.8	749	
Green	0			0	0.0	0.6	557	
VPP	0			0	0.0	0.3	254	

== Ward results ==
=== Billingham Central ===
Billingham Central
Party	Candidate	Votes	%	±%
Labour	Ann McCoy	588	44.7	
Labour	Barack Woodhouse	560	42.6	
UKIP	Avril Richards	488	37.1	
Liberal Democrats	Audrey Pollard	185	14.1	
Conservative	Maureen Merifield	180	13.7	
Conservative	Judith Wellington	168	12.8	
Turnout		1,331	25.3	
Labour hold				
Labour hold				

=== Billingham East ===
Billingham East
Party	Candidate	Votes	%	±%
Labour	Mick Stoker	680	61.3	
Labour	Evaline Cunningham	635	57.3	
Green	David Stringer	289	26.1	
Conservative	Paula Gardner	143	12.9	
Conservative	John Sharp	137	12.4	
Turnout		1,141	23.0	
Labour hold				
Labour hold				

No UKIP candidate as previous (-22.0).

=== Billingham North ===
Billingham North
Party	Candidate	Votes	%	±%
Labour	Chris Barlow	1,135	50.8	
Labour	Lauriane Povey	1,049	47.0	
Labour	Clare Gamble	970	43.4	
North East	Mark Burdon	542	24.3	New
Conservative	Sam Linley	504	22.6	
UKIP	Paul Christie	475	21.3	
Conservative	Angela French	340	15.2	
Conservative	Marcus Vickers	339	15.2	
Green	Julie Harrison	268	12.0	New
Turnout		2,245	32.6	
Labour hold				
Labour hold				
Labour hold				

=== Billingham South ===
Billingham South
Party	Candidate	Votes	%	±%
Labour	Jean O'Donnell	704	54.8	
Labour	Mike Smith	646	50.3	
UKIP	Ian Reeves	411	32.0	
Conservative	Margaret Carney	234	18.2	
Conservative	Mary Jupp	179	13.9	
Turnout		1,299	28.2	
Labour hold				
Labour hold				

No BIA candidate as previous (-9.5).

=== Billingham West ===
Billingham West
Party	Candidate	Votes	%	±%
Independent	Helen Atkinson	925	50.6	
Independent	Chris Clough	895	49.0	
Conservative	Tony Maxwell	515	28.2	
Conservative	Jack Miller	414	22.7	
Labour	Paul Jenkins	380	20.8	
Labour	Katie Weston	315	17.2	
Turnout		1,830	41.1	
Independent hold				
Independent hold				

=== Bishopsgarth & Elm Tree ===
Bishopsgarth & Elm Tree
Party	Candidate	Votes	%	±%
Liberal Democrats	Julia Cherrett	955	49.4	
Liberal Democrats	David Minchella	807	41.7	
Labour	Sharon Bailey	420	21.7	
UKIP	Sandra Gibson	363	18.8	New
Labour	Owen Riddle	360	18.6	
Conservative	David Smith	350	18.1	
Conservative	Miranda Jupp	306	15.8	
Turnout		1,938	39.0	
Liberal Democrats hold				
Liberal Democrats gain from Labour				

=== Eaglescliffe ===
Eaglescliffe
Party	Candidate	Votes	%	±%
Conservative	Stafan Houghton	1,934	65.3	
Conservative	Laura Tunney	1,844	62.2	
Conservative	Jacqueline Bright	1,643	55.5	
Liberal Democrats	Mike Cherrett	822	27.7	
Labour	James Clarke	814	27.5	
Turnout		3,018	36.7	
Conservative hold				
Conservative hold				
Conservative hold				

No UKIP candidate as previous (-13.3).

=== Fairfield ===
Fairfield
Party	Candidate	Votes	%	±%
Independent	Bill Woodhead	1,012	53.3	New
Independent	Maurice Perry	923	48.7	New
Conservative	Sophie Craig	433	22.8	
Conservative	Stephen Matthews	395	20.8	
Labour	Anne Hollifield	316	16.7	
Labour	Jim Gardner	310	16.3	
UKIP	Kathleen Leishman	138	7.3	
Liberal Democrats	Kate Seow	56	3.0	
Liberal Democrats	Mike Wade	51	2.7	
Turnout		1,898	41.9	
Independent gain from Conservative				
Independent gain from Conservative				

=== Grangefield ===
Grangefield
Party	Candidate	Votes	%	±%
Labour	Carol Clark	902	43.7	
Conservative	Stephen Richardson	832	40.3	
Labour	Jo Booth	826	40.1	
Conservative	Joan Holdaway	751	36.4	
UKIP	Paul Berriman	281	13.6	
UKIP	Adrian Clarkson	222	10.8	
Liberal Democrats	Nick Webb	110	5.3	
Liberal Democrats	Matthew Eves	86	4.2	
Turnout		2,071	40.4	
Labour hold				
Conservative gain from Labour				

=== Hardwick & Salters Lane ===
Hardwick & Salters Lane
Party	Candidate	Votes	%	±%
Labour	Norma Stephenson	636	58.7	
Labour	Nigel Cooke	612	56.5	
UKIP	Gordon Parkin	298	27.5	
Conservative	Helen Feldon	149	13.7	
Conservative	William Feldon	138	12.7	
Turnout		1,087	21.6	
Labour hold				
Labour hold				

=== Hartburn ===
Hartburn
Party	Candidate	Votes	%	±%
Conservative	Matt Vickers	1,545	66.5	
Conservative	Lynn Hall	1,516	65.3	
Labour	Shakeel Hussain	407	17.5	
Labour	Christopher Coombs	390	16.8	
UKIP	John Leishman	300	12.9	
Turnout		2,335	45.0	
Conservative hold				
Conservative hold				

=== Ingleby Barwick East ===
Ingleby Barwick East
Party	Candidate	Votes	%	±%
Conservative	Sally Watson	897	36.4	
Independent	Ted Strike	816	33.1	
Conservative	Alan Watson	765	31.0	
Ingleby Barwick Independent Society	Gillian Corr	738	29.9	
Conservative	Jenny Rutland	737	29.9	
Ingleby Barwick Independent Society	Stefan Barnes	696	28.2	
Ingleby Barwick Independent Society	David Harrington	695	28.2	
Independent	John Butler	472	19.1	
Independent	Rick Turnbull	369	15.0	
Labour	Charlotte Hall	356	14.4	
Turnout		2,484	32.3	
Conservative hold		Swing		
Independent gain from Ingleby Barwick Independent Society		Swing		
Conservative gain from Ingleby Barwick Independent Society		Swing		

=== Ingleby Barwick West ===
Ingleby Barwick West
Party	Candidate	Votes	%	±%
Ingleby Barwick Independent Society	Ken Dixon	1,450	53.9	
Ingleby Barwick Independent Society	Kevin Faulks	1,416	52.7	
Ingleby Barwick Independent Society	Ross Patterson	1,381	51.4	
Conservative	Haden Brown	765	28.5	
Conservative	Philip Murphy	586	21.8	
Conservative	Dan Fagan	572	21.3	
Labour	John Butler	512	19.0	
Independent	Zoe Mathers	399	14.8	
Turnout		2,716	29.6	
Ingleby Barwick Independent Society hold				
Ingleby Barwick Independent Society hold				
Ingleby Barwick Independent Society hold				

=== Mandale & Victoria ===
Mandale & Victoria
Party	Candidate	Votes	%	±%
Thornaby Independent Association	Luke Frost	996	54.9	
Thornaby Independent Association	Tina Large	965	53.2	
Thornaby Independent Association	Steve Walmsley	960	53.0	
Labour	Sonia Bailey	632	34.9	
Labour	Ian Bailey	623	34.4	
Labour	Richard Eglington	590	32.5	
Conservative	Neil Morrison	111	6.1	
Conservative	Vanessa Sewell	105	5.8	
Conservative	Freda Morrison	101	5.6	
Turnout		1,823	25.4	
Thornaby Independent Association gain from Labour		Swing		
Thornaby Independent Association gain from Labour		Swing		
Thornaby Independent Association gain from Labour		Swing		

=== Newtown ===
Newtown
Party	Candidate	Votes	%	±%
Labour	Marilyn Surtees	638	59.4	
Labour	Paul Weston	505	47.0	
Independent	Paul Baker	388	36.1	
Conservative	Alan Davison	152	14.2	
Conservative	Michael Richardson	115	10.7	
Turnout		1,090	23.1	
Labour hold				
Labour hold				

=== Northern Parishes ===
Northern Parishes
Party	Candidate	Votes	%	±%
Conservative	John Gardner	575	56.8	
Labour	John Cunningham	230	22.7	
North East	John Tait	207	20.5	
Majority				
Turnout			30.8	
Conservative hold				

=== Norton North ===
Norton North
Party	Candidate	Votes	%	±%
Labour	Steven Nelson	930	69.3	
Labour	Lisa Grainge	858	63.9	
Conservative	Sarah Dent	371	27.6	
Conservative	John Dent	340	25.3	
Turnout		1,376	28.5	
Labour hold				
Labour hold				

=== Norton South ===
Norton South
Party	Candidate	Votes	%	±%
Labour	Bob Cook	825	61.1	
Labour	Eileen Johnson	731	54.1	
UKIP	Trevor Stephens	345	25.5	
Conservative	Christopher Pickles	223	16.5	
Conservative	Derrick Wild	194	14.4	
Turnout		1,356	28.9	
Labour hold				
Labour hold				

=== Norton West ===
Norton West
Party	Candidate	Votes	%	±%
Conservative	Hilary Vickers	1,092	46.6	
Conservative	Tony Riordan	1,027	43.8	
Labour	David Wilburn	970	41.4	
Labour	Norma Wilburn	968	41.3	
UKIP	Gary Leighton	392	16.7	
Turnout		2,361	47.2	
Conservative gain from Labour				
Conservative gain from Labour				

=== Parkfield & Oxbridge ===
Parkfield & Oxbridge
Party	Candidate	Votes	%	±%
Labour Co-op	Louise Baldock	1,024	64.5	
Labour Co-op	Mohammed Javed	854	53.8	
Conservative	Aidan Cockerill	379	23.9	
Conservative	Alice Entwisle	289	18.2	
Liberal Democrats	Chris Keelty	213	13.4	
Liberal Democrats	Denis Rigg	137	8.6	
Turnout		1,620	28.0	
Labour Co-op hold				
Labour Co-op hold				

=== Roseworth ===
Roseworth
Party	Candidate	Votes	%	±%
Labour	Jim Beall	613	52.4	
Labour	Barbara Inman	596	50.9	
UKIP	Paul Jenkins	400	34.2	
Conservative	Philip Wild	210	17.9	
Conservative	Marie Smailes	165	14.1	
Turnout		1,178	24.0	
Labour hold				
Labour hold				

=== Stainsby Hill ===
Stainsby Hill
Party	Candidate	Votes	%	±%
Thornaby Independent Association	Sylvia May	868	60.7	
Thornaby Independent Association	Ray Godwin	787	55.1	
Labour	Derrick Brown	406	28.4	
Labour	Catherine Milburn	375	26.2	
Conservative	John Chapman	113	7.9	
Conservative	Leigh Tolley	73	5.1	
Turnout		1,436	30.5	
Thornaby Independent Association hold				
Thornaby Independent Association gain from Labour				

=== Stockton Town Centre ===
Stockton Town Centre
Party	Candidate	Votes	%	±%
Labour	Paul Kirton	594	58.0	
Labour	Paul Beall	585	57.1	
VPP	Julie Cooper	254	24.8	
Independent	Giles Harris	186	18.2	
Conservative	Mary Verrill	108	10.5	
Conservative	Ronald Verrill	105	10.3	
Turnout		1,027	24.1	
Labour hold				
Labour hold				

=== Village ===
Village
Party	Candidate	Votes	%	±%
Thoraby Independent Association	Ian Dalgarno	1,146	67.8	
Thoraby Independent Association	Mick Moore	1,134	67.1	
Labour	Ivor Morgan	362	21.4	
Conservative	Ian Geer	176	10.4	
Conservative	Lee Spence	156	9.2	
Turnout		1,698	33.3	
Thornaby Independent Association hold		Swing		
Thornaby Independent Association hold		Swing		

=== Western Parishes ===
Western Parishes
Party	Candidate	Votes	%	±%
Conservative	Andrew Stephenson	510	55.7	
Labour	David Bates	240	26.2	
UKIP	Brian Gregory	165	18.0	
Turnout			33.5	
Conservative hold				

=== Yarm ===
Yarm
Party	Candidate	Votes	%	±%
Independent	Andrew Sherris	1,839	60.9	
Conservative	Julie Whitehall	1,396	46.2	
Conservative	Tony Hampton	1,260	41.7	
Conservative	Elsi Hampton	1,207	40.0	
Labour	Helen Deehan	683	22.6	
Turnout		3,040	37.8	
Independent gain from Conservative				
Conservative hold				
Conservative hold				
