= 2015 Stockton-on-Tees Borough Council election =

2015 UK local government election

Results of the 2015 Stockton-on-Tees Borough Council election

The 2015 Stockton-on-Tees Borough Council election took place on 7 May 2015 to elect members of the Stockton-on-Tees Borough Council in England. It was held on the same day as other local elections.
