= Stockton-on-Tees Town Hall =

Municipal building in Stockton-on-Tees, County Durham, England

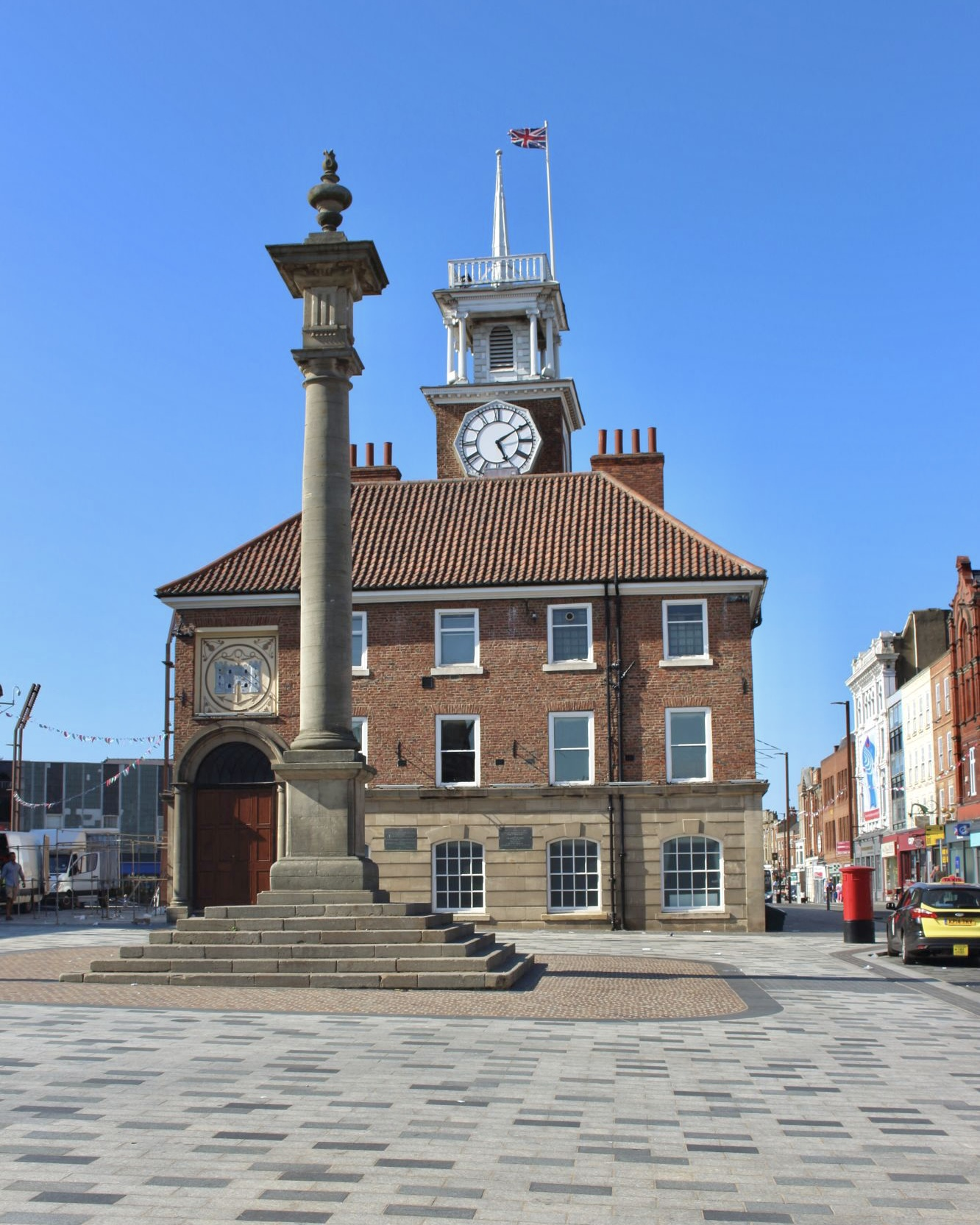
- Stockton-on-Tees Town Hall

- Shown in County Durham
- 54.5641°N 1.3129°W
- Location: Stockton-on-Tees

History
- Built: 1735

Site notes
- Architectural style: Neo-Georgian style

Listed Building – Grade II*
- Official name: Town Hall, High Street
- Designated: 19 January 1951
- Reference no.: 1139975

Stockton-on-Tees Town Hall is a municipal building in the High Street in Stockton-on-Tees, County Durham, England. The building, which is the meeting place of Stockton-on-Tees Borough Council, is a Grade II* listed building.

== History ==
The first structure on the site, traditionally referred to a town house, was completed in around 1100 and rebuilt in the late 15th century. A purpose-built tolbooth was erected just south of the original building in the late 17th century: it was arcaded on the ground floor to allow markets to be held and there was a lock up in the building to accommodate prisoners, as well as a meeting room on the first floor and adjoining accommodation to allow visitors to stay. The building was owned by the Bishops of Durham who collected rents from use of the market stalls and the rooms above.

The current structure, which was designed in the Georgian style, was completed in 1735. The old tolbooth was demolished in 1744 to allow the new building to be extended. The design for the new building involved a symmetrical main frontage with five bays facing the market square; the left hand bay featured a round headed doorway flanked by engaged Doric order columns with the borough coat of arms placed above the doorway. The side elevations displayed Venetian windows and the north elevation featured a doorway in the central bay and five round headed casement windows on the first floor. At roof level there was a short clock tower with a belfry surrounded by Ionic order columns supporting a small balcony; the hour-striking clock currently in place in the turret was installed by Thwaites & Reed of Clerkenwell in 1805. A piazza was created to the north of the building and a market cross designed by John Shout was erected there in 1768.

At a meeting in the town hall in 1810, the recorder of Stockton, Leonard Raisbeck, used the opportunity to advocate the need for a railway to connect the borough with the more central parts of the country. The lock-up became redundant after a police station, complete with cells, was completed in West Row in 1851. The building was refurbished in the 1880s and the piazza was covered over with an iron canopy in 1890.

Stockton-on-Tees Municipal Borough Council acquired the building from the Bishops of Durham in 1939 in order to secure continued access to their meeting place and then hosted a visit by Queen Elizabeth II, accompanied by the Duke of Edinburgh, on 4 June 1956. Municipal buildings, which were commissioned to provide additional office space for council officers and their departments, were built nearby, in Church Road, and completed in 1961. The town hall ceased to be local seat of government when the short-lived County Borough of Teesside was formed in 1967: however, its main role as a civic meeting place was restored when Stockton-on-Tees Borough Council was formed in 1974. An extensive programme of refurbishment works was completed in 2011.
