= 2011 Stockton-on-Tees Borough Council election =

2011 UK local government election

Results of the 2011 Stockton-on-Tees Borough Council election

The 2011 Stockton-on-Tees Borough Council election was held on Thursday 5 May 2011 to elect 56 members to Stockton-on-Tees Borough Council, the same day as other local elections in the United Kingdom. It elected all of the council's members to a four-year term. The council remained under no overall control. The turnout across the council was 38.9%.

== Results summary ==
2011 Stockton-on-Tees Borough Council election
Party	Seats	Net gain/loss	Seats %	Votes %	Votes	+/−
Labour	27	▲5	48.2			
Conservative	12	▼1	21.4			
Ingleby Barwick Independent Society	6	Steady	10.7			
Thornaby Independent Association	5	▼2	8.9			
Liberal Democrats	4	▼4	7.1			
Billingham Independents Association	2	▲2	3.6			
Yarm Independent Association	0	Steady	0.0			
Stockton Independents Association	0	Steady	0.0			
Newtown Independent Party	0	Steady	0.0			
UKIP	0	Steady	0.0			
Independent	0	Steady	0.0			

== Ward results ==
=== Billingham Central ===
Billingham Central (2 seats)
Party	Candidate	Votes	%	±%
Labour	Ann McCoy*	872		
Labour	Barry Woodhouse*	804		
Billingham Independents Association	Ann Fernie	438		
Billingham Independents Association	Peter Fernie	414		
Conservative	Elizabeth Croot	230		
Conservative	Michael Hornby	164		
Liberal Democrats	Audrey Pollard	116		
Turnout			31.6	
Registered electors		5,248		
Labour hold				
Labour hold				

=== Billingham East ===
Billingham East (2 seats)
Party	Candidate	Votes	%	±%
Labour	Mick Stoker*	943		
Labour	Evaline Cunningham	921		
Billingham Independents Association	June Simpson	273		
Billingham Independents Association	Ron Simpson	260		
Conservative	Elsie Mallinson	123		
Conservative	Debra Stephenson	121		
Liberal Democrats	Ian Tate	99		
Turnout			27.9	
Registered electors		5,296		
Labour hold				
Labour hold				

=== Billingham North ===
Billingham North (3 seats)
Party	Candidate	Votes	%	±%
Billingham Independents Association	Colin Leckonby* (Note: All three of the candidates for the Billingham Independents Association in the Billingham North ward were elected in 2007 as candidates for the Liberal Democrats in the same ward.)	1,039		
Billingham Independents Association	Lynne Apedaile*	980		
Labour	Ray McCall	935		
Billingham Independents Association	Hilary Aggio*	905		
Labour	Sheila Smart	888		
Labour	Andrew Cunningham (Note: Please note that the Elections Centre incorrectly attributes Andrew Cunningham as an incumbent council member. In actuality, Cunningham was the unsuccessful Labour candidate for the Billingham West ward in 2007.)	882		
Conservative	Tony Maxwell	637		
Conservative	Jane Bullock	574		
Conservative	Andy Hatton	535		
Liberal Democrats	Benjamin Collier	145		
Liberal Democrats	George Hebron	106		
Liberal Democrats	Nicholas Vaughan	88		
Turnout			39.1	
Registered electors		7,283		
Billingham Independents Association gain from Liberal Democrats				
Billingham Independents Association gain from Liberal Democrats				
Labour gain from Liberal Democrats				

=== Billingham South ===
Billingham South (2 seats)
Party	Candidate	Votes	%	±%
Labour	Jean O'Donnell*	984		
Labour	Mike Smith*	849		
Conservative	James Sherris	279		
Independent	Jayne Hector	257		
Conservative	Mark Sherris	230		
Liberal Democrats	Jenifer Rodway	157		
Liberal Democrats	Paul Rodway	121		
Turnout			32.6	
Registered electors		4,966		
Labour hold				
Labour hold				

=== Billingham West ===
Billingham West (2 seats)
Party	Candidate	Votes	%	±%
Conservative	Michael Womphrey*	1,586		
Conservative	Mary Womphrey*	1,563		
Labour	George O'Neill	590		
Liberal Democrats	Christopher Davison	247		
Turnout			47.9	
Registered electors		4,814		
Conservative hold				
Conservative hold				

=== Bishopsgarth and Elm Tree ===
Bishopsgarth and Elm Tree (2 seats)
Party	Candidate	Votes	%	±%
Liberal Democrats	Julia Cherrett	1,021		
Liberal Democrats	Elliot Kennedy	952		
Labour	Peter Davies	800		
Labour	Chris Coombs	798		
Conservative	Sandra Bainbridge	493		
Conservative	Michael Marshall-Deane	426		
Turnout			44.7	
Registered electors		5,291		
Liberal Democrats hold				
Liberal Democrats hold				

=== Eaglescliffe ===
Eaglescliffe (3 seats)
Party	Candidate	Votes	%	±%
Liberal Democrats	Maureen Rigg*	1,695		
Liberal Democrats	Alan Lewis*	1,547		
Conservative	Philip Dennis	1,447		
Liberal Democrats	Lesley Lewis	1,392		
Conservative	Laura Tunney	1,318		
Conservative	Judith Wellington	1,224		
Labour	Philip Hewitt	841		
Labour	Helen Pickering	798		
Labour	Reg Rowlinson	773		
Turnout			47.2	
Registered electors		8,279		
Liberal Democrats hold				
Liberal Democrats hold				
Conservative gain from Liberal Democrats				

=== Fairfield ===
Fairfield (2 seats)
Party	Candidate	Votes	%	±%
Conservative	Bill Woodhead*	1,282		
Conservative	Maurice Perry*	1,169		
Labour	Philippa Storey	687		
Labour	Michael Mannion	618		
Liberal Democrats	Stephen Crighton	98		
Turnout			43.5	
Registered electors		4,795		
Conservative hold				
Conservative hold				

=== Grangefield ===
Grangefield (2 seats)
Party	Candidate	Votes	%	±%
Labour	Carol Clark	1,303		
Labour	Michael Clark	1,297		
Conservative	Aidan Cockerill*	1,180		
Conservative	Philip Broughton*	1,110		
Liberal Democrats	Ian Mortimore	128		
Turnout			50.2	
Registered electors		5,284		
Labour gain from Conservative				
Labour gain from Conservative				

=== Hardwick ===
Hardwick (2 seats)
Party	Candidate	Votes	%	±%
Labour	Norma Stephenson	807		
Labour	Nigel Cooke	770		
UKIP	Colin Rigg	159		
Conservative	Russell Crawford	142		
Conservative	Lorraine Crawford	136		
Stockton Independents Association	Tom Copeland	133		
Stockton Independents Association	Greig Cowley	128		
Liberal Democrats	Denis Reed	62		
Turnout			27.4	
Registered electors		4,834		
Labour hold				
Labour hold				

=== Hartburn ===
Hartburn (2 seats)
Party	Candidate	Votes	%	±%
Conservative	Ken Lupton*	1,852		
Conservative	Terry Laing*	1,824		
Labour	Derek Cooke	688		
Labour	Giles Harris	664		
Liberal Democrats	Ann Hollingsworth	188		
Turnout			51.2	
Registered electors		5,464		
Conservative hold				
Conservative hold				

=== Ingleby Barwick East ===
Ingleby Barwick East (3 seats)
Party	Candidate	Votes	%	±%
Ingleby Barwick Independent Society	Kevin Faulks*	1,588		
Ingleby Barwick Independent Society	Jean Kirby	1,550		
Ingleby Barwick Independent Society	Gillian Corr	1,546		
Labour	Luke Henman	584		
Conservative	Neil Morrison	552		
Conservative	Freda Morrison	522		
Conservative	Jillian Morrison	514		
Liberal Democrats	Stephen Ede	190		
Liberal Democrats	Irene Machin	176		
Liberal Democrats	Stephen Hill	120		
Turnout			36.5	
Registered electors		7,517		
Ingleby Barwick Independent Society hold				
Ingleby Barwick Independent Society hold				
Ingleby Barwick Independent Society hold				

=== Ingleby Barwick West ===
Ingleby Barwick West (3 seats)
Party	Candidate	Votes	%	±%
Ingleby Barwick Independent Society	Kenneth Dixon*	2,031		
Ingleby Barwick Independent Society	David Harrington*	1,957		
Ingleby Barwick Independent Society	Ross Patterson*	1,946		
Labour	Chris Harrison	457		
Conservative	Keith Coles	367		
Conservative	Sally Entwisle	305		
Conservative	Alice Entwisle	294		
Liberal Democrats	David Harding	84		
Turnout			37.0	
Registered electors		7,448		
Ingleby Barwick Independent Society hold				
Ingleby Barwick Independent Society hold				
Ingleby Barwick Independent Society hold				

=== Mandale and Victoria ===
Mandale and Victoria (3 seats)
Party	Candidate	Votes	%	±%
Thornaby Independent Association	Steve Walmsley*	1,027		
Labour	Tracey Stott	1,018		
Thornaby Independent Association	Tina Large*	1,005		
Thornaby Independent Association	Dave Kennington	975		
Labour	Sue Donaghy	946		
Labour	Terry Murphy	902		
Conservative	Jonathan Scott	220		
Conservative	Leigh Tunney	154		
Conservative	Helen West	133		
Liberal Democrats	Urslaan Khan	84		
Turnout			30.4	
Registered electors		7,595		
Thornaby Independent Association hold				
Labour gain from Thornaby Independent Association				
Thornaby Independent Association hold				

=== Newtown ===
Newtown (2 seats)
Party	Candidate	Votes	%	±%
Labour	Bob Gibson*	736		
Labour	Paul Baker*	684		
Newtown Independent Party	Roy Parker	407		
Newtown Independent Party	Anth Ayre	366		
Conservative	Jim Wood	159		
Conservative	Robert Sherris	132		
Liberal Democrats	John Atkinson	78		
Turnout			27.8	
Registered electors		4,980		
Labour hold				
Labour hold				

=== Northern Parishes ===
Northern Parishes (1 seat)
Party	Candidate	Votes	%	±%
Conservative	John Gardner*	687	61.3	▼5.2
Labour	John Cunningham	342	30.5	▲10.7
Liberal Democrats	Patricia Ramwell	91	8.1	▼5.5
Majority		345	30.8	▼15.9
Total valid votes		1,120	41.4	
Turnout			41.8	
Registered electors		2,703		
Conservative hold		Swing	▼8.0	

=== Norton North ===
Norton North (2 seats)
Party	Candidate	Votes	%	±%
Labour	Steve Nelson*	1,114		
Labour	Kathryn Nelson*	1,113		
Conservative	Mauveen Brown	413		
Conservative	Marcus Vickers	359		
Liberal Democrats	David Winfield	144		
Turnout			34.3	
Registered electors		5,040		
Labour hold				
Labour hold				

=== Norton South ===
Norton South (2 seats)
Party	Candidate	Votes	%	±%
Labour	Bob Cook*	1,197		
Labour	Eileen Johnson	990		
Conservative	June Fletcher	287		
Conservative	Julia Whitehill	258		
Liberal Democrats	Geoffrey Boston	199		
Liberal Democrats	Philip Addison	106		
Turnout			34.7	
Registered electors		4,877		
Labour hold				
Labour hold				

=== Norton West ===
Norton West (2 seats)
Party	Candidate	Votes	%	±%
Labour	David Wilburn	1,516		
Labour	Norma Wilburn	1,480		
Conservative	Hilary Vickers	972		
Conservative	Matthew Vickers	941		
Liberal Democrats	Stella Grieve	144		
Turnout			50.9	
Registered electors		5,205		
Labour hold				
Labour hold				

=== Parkfield and Oxbridge ===
Parkfield and Oxbridge (2 seats)
Party	Candidate	Votes	%	±%
Labour	Mohammed Javed*	801		
Labour	David Rose	771		
Stockton Independents Association	Amin Mohammed	451		
Conservative	James Hudson	444		
Conservative	Leroy Phillips	345		
Independent	Shakeel Noor	255		
Stockton Independents Association	Paul Leng	250		
Liberal Democrats	Denis Rigg	106		
Liberal Democrats	Michael Cherrett	93		
Turnout			39.3	
Registered electors		5,027		
Labour hold				
Labour hold				

=== Roseworth ===
Roseworth (2 seats)
Party	Candidate	Votes	%	±%
Labour	Jim Beall*	1,152		
Labour	Barbara Inman*	956		
UKIP	Gordon Parkin	327		
Conservative	Paula Gardner	134		
Conservative	Richard Gardner	125		
Liberal Democrats	Kevin Sexton	72		
Turnout			31.5	
Registered electors		5,130		
Labour hold				
Labour hold				

=== Stainsby Hill ===
Stainsby Hill (2 seats)
Party	Candidate	Votes	%	±%
Labour	Derrick Brown	833		
Thornaby Independent Association	Sylvia Walmsley*	817		
Labour	Daniel Johnson	783		
Thornaby Independent Association	Geoff Green	744		
Conservative	Dick Wardell	157		
Conservative	Sue Laing	122		
Liberal Democrats	Avril Monck	33		
Turnout			39.4	
Registered electors		4,799		
Labour gain from Thornaby Independent Association				
Thornaby Independent Association hold				

=== Stockton Town Centre ===
Stocktown Town Centre (2 seats)
Party	Candidate	Votes	%	±%
Labour	David Coleman*	810		
Labour	Paul Kirton*	750		
Stockton Independents Association	Ted Strike	204		
Stockton Independents Association	Ghulam Mustafa	190		
UKIP	Peter Braney	106		
Conservative	Carrol Lupton	101		
Conservative	Marie Smailes	89		
Liberal Democrats	Mike Wade	49		
Turnout			29.4	
Registered electors		4,278		
Labour hold				
Labour hold				

=== Village ===
Village (2 seats)
Party	Candidate	Votes	%	±%
Thornaby Independent Association	Mick Eddy	1,087		
Thornaby Independent Association	Ian Dalgarno	1,022		
Labour	Leslie Hodge	660		
Labour	Paul Rowling	591		
Conservative	John Chapman	242		
Conservative	Liam Harrison	196		
Liberal Democrats	Craig Gray	60		
Liberal Democrats	Christopher Swales	56		
Turnout			39.3	
Registered electors		5,236		
Thornaby Independent Association hold				
Thornaby Independent Association hold				

=== Western Parishes ===
Western Parishes (1 seat)
Party	Candidate	Votes	%	±%
Conservative	Andrew Stephenson	548	46.6	▼10.9
Labour	Ann Brewer	379	32.2	▲7.0
Liberal Democrats	Steve Fletcher	249	21.2	▲3.9
Majority		169	14.4	▼17.9
Total valid votes		1,176	44.6	
Turnout			44.9	
Registered electors		2,634		
Conservative hold		Swing	▼8.9	

=== Yarm ===
Yarm (3 seats)
Party	Candidate	Votes	%	±%
Conservative	Andrew Sherris*	1,829		
Conservative	Mark Chatburn	1,721		
Conservative	Ben Houchen	1,556		
Yarm Independent Association	Marjorie Simpson	1,287		
Yarm Independent Association	Christopher Neil	1,218		
Yarm Independent Association	Robert Wegg	1,101		
Labour	Simon Tranter	666		
Labour	Eric Turton	620		
Labour	Vicky Parker	610		
Liberal Democrats	Natasha Craggs	186		
Liberal Democrats	Jonathan Wylie	152		
Liberal Democrats	Lindsay Wylie	141		
Turnout			50.2	
Registered electors		7,765		
Conservative hold				
Conservative hold				
Conservative hold				
