= 2023 Stockton-on-Tees Borough Council election =

2023 English local election

- 4 May 2023

All 56 seats on Stockton-on-Tees Borough Council 29 seats needed for a majority

	First party	Second party	Third party
Leader	Tony Riordan	Bob Cook	Sylvia Walmsley
Party	Conservative	Labour	Thornaby Independent Association
Last election	14	24	7
Seats before	16	24	6
Seats after	26	22	4
Seat change	▲12	▼2	▼3
	Fourth party	Fifth party	Sixth party
Leader	Kevin Faulks	N/A	N/A
Party	Ingleby Barwick Independent Society	Independent	Liberal Democrats
Last election	3	6	2
Seats before	3	6 (Note: Of the six independent councillors prior to the election, two sat as the "Fairfield and Yarm Independents" group, two sat as the "Billingham West and Ingleby Barwick East Independents" group and the other two were not aligned to any group.)	1
Seats after	3	1	0
Seat change	0	▼5	▼1
- Winner of each seat at the 2023 Stockton-on-Tees Borough Council election
Leader before election
Bob Cook
Labour
No overall control
Leader after election
Bob Cook
Labour
No overall control

The 2023 Stockton-on-Tees Borough Council election took place on 4 May 2023 to elect all 56 members of Stockton-on-Tees Borough Council, a unitary authority which straddles the ceremonial counties of County Durham and North Yorkshire in England. This was on the same day as other local elections across England.

The council remained under no overall control after the election, being led by a Labour minority administration.

== Overview ==
Prior to the election the council was under no overall control with Labour the largest party.

New ward boundaries were drawn up for the election by the Local Government Boundary Commission for England. The overall number of councillors stayed the same at 56.

The election for the three seats in Hartburn ward was postponed to 22 June 2023 following the death of a candidate.

The council remained under no overall control after the election but the Conservatives overtook Labour to become the largest party, in a result which went against the national trend for the 2023 elections.

At the annual council meeting on 24 May 2023 following the election, the two small parties of the Thornaby Independent Association and the Ingleby Barwick Independent Society voted with Labour to allow the minority Labour administration led by Bob Cook to continue to run the council.

New councillor Shakeel Hussain was elected as a Conservative but was then prevented from sitting with the Conservative group pending an investigation into alleged social media posts.

== Summary ==
=== Election result ===
2023 Stockton-on-Tees Borough Council election
Party	Candidates	Seats	Gains	Losses	Net gain/loss	Seats %	Votes %	Votes	+/−
Conservative	56	26			▲12	46.4	43.0	42,338	+9.8
Labour	47	22			▼2	39.3	33.6	33,058	+1.0
Thornaby Independent Association	6	4			▼3	7.1	4.5	4,418	–3.1
Ingleby Barwick Independent Society	6	3			0	5.4	5.7	5,573	–1.4
Independent	22	1			▼5	1.8	7.8	7,647	–1.3
Green	13	0			0	0.0	3.4	3,382	+2.8
Reform	10	0			0	0.0	2.1	2,115	New

The Liberal Democrats also lost two seats, but is not shown in the above table as they did not stand any candidates at this election.

== Ward results ==
The results for each ward were as follows, with asterisks(*) indicating sitting councillors standing for re-election. Some are not standing in their previous wards:

=== Billingham Central ===
Billingham Central ward (2 seats)
Party	Candidate	Votes	%	±%
Labour	Ann May McCoy*	826	60.3	
Labour	Barack Woodhouse*	733	53.5	
Reform	John Gerard McDermottroe	308	22.5	
Conservative	John Sharp	259	18.9	
Conservative	Lynn Tunney	242	17.7	
Green	Christine Stringer	159	11.6	
Turnout		1,372	25.30	
Registered electors		5,421		
Labour hold				
Labour hold				

=== Billingham East ===
Billingham East ward (2 seats)
Party	Candidate	Votes	%	±%
Labour	Michelle Diane Bendelow	781	63.6	
Labour	Michael Nicholas Stoker* (Mick Stoker)	732	59.6	
Conservative	Margaret Carney	233	19.0	
Green	Colin George Jeffrey	215	17.5	
Conservative	Ian Geer	207	16.9	
Green	David Pryce Stringer	178	14.5	
Turnout		1,237	24.28	
Registered electors		5,095		
Labour hold				
Labour hold				

=== Billingham North ===
Billingham North ward (2 seats)
Party	Candidate	Votes	%	±%
Labour	Clare Michelle Gamble*	1,045	56.5	
Labour	Marc Graham Besford	1,011	54.6	
Conservative	Kevin Barry	718	38.8	
Conservative	Luke Stott	593	32.1	
Green	Jessica Ruth Hobson (Jess Hobson)	148	8.0	
Turnout		1,856	35.58	
Registered electors		5,216		
Labour hold				
Labour hold				

Billingham North had been a three seat ward prior to the new boundaries which came into effect for this election.

=== Billingham South ===
Billingham South ward (2 seats)
Party	Candidate	Votes	%	±%
Labour	Paul Weston*	1,037	66.3	
Labour	Katie Doreen Weston	1,005	64.3	
Conservative	David Scott	298	19.1	
Conservative	Joan Holdaway	291	18.6	
Reform	David Roger Spence	150	9.6	
Green	Kenneth Stringer	129	8.2	
Independent	Splendita Maria Lacey	56	3.6	
Turnout		1,568	27.70	
Registered electors		5,661		
Labour hold				
Labour hold				

=== Billingham West & Wolviston ===
Billingham West & Wolviston ward (2 seats)
Party	Candidate	Votes	%	±%
Conservative	David Reynard	838	42.5	
Conservative	Marcus Lennon Vickers	766	38.9	
Independent	Helen Atkinson*	634	32.2	
Labour	Michael Smith* (Mike Smith)	549	27.9	
Labour	Daniel Adam Forrest	524	26.6	
Independent	Guy David Snead	485	24.6	
Turnout		1,974	41.52	
Registered electors		4,754		
Conservative win (new seat)				
Conservative win (new seat)				

=== Bishopsgarth & Elm Tree ===
Bishopsgarth & Elm Tree ward (2 seats)
Party	Candidate	Votes	%	±%
Conservative	Hugo Thomas Stratton*	1,288	62.2	
Conservative	Emily Anne Tate	1,227	59.2	
Labour	John Cunningham	764	36.9	
Labour	Stephen James Jennings	752	36.3	
Turnout		2,079	42.69	
Registered electors		4,870		
Conservative hold				
Conservative gain from Liberal Democrats				

=== Eaglescliffe East ===
Eaglescliffe East ward (2 seats)
Party	Candidate	Votes	%	±%
Conservative	Stefan Richard Houghton*	1,258	63.6	
Conservative	James Edward Taylor (Jim Taylor)	1,101	55.7	
Labour	Reginald Rowlinson	682	34.5	
Green	Kiran Singh	484	24.5	
Turnout		1,985	42.22	
Registered electors		4,702		
Conservative win (new seat)				
Conservative win (new seat)				

=== Eaglescliffe West ===
Eaglescliffe West ward (2 seats)
Party	Candidate	Votes	%	±%
Conservative	Laura Tunney	1,204	60.3	
Conservative	Diane Clarke	1,140	57.1	
Labour	Francis William Batchelor	623	31.2	
Labour	James Clarke	494	24.7	
Green	Samuel Ernest Bradford	168	8.4	
Reform	Andrew Frederick Stephenson	135	6.8	
Turnout		2,008	40.70	
Registered electors		4,934		
Conservative win (new seat)				
Conservative win (new seat)				

=== Fairfield ===
Fairfield ward (3 seats)
Party	Candidate	Votes	%	±%
Conservative	Stephen John Richardson*	1,273	43.7	
Conservative	Alexander Mitchell Rowe Griffiths (Alex Griffiths)	1,219	41.8	
Conservative	Susan Maria Scott	1,183	40.6	
Labour	Andrew Cunningham	801	27.5	
Labour	Jack Conner James Johnson-Colmer	723	24.8	
Labour	John George Hetherington Stephenson	712	24.4	
Independent	William Woodhead* (Bill Woodhead)	694	23.8	
Independent	Maurice Perry*	582	20.0	
Independent	Laraine Ann Perry	519	17.8	
Reform	Neil McCabe	242	8.3	
Independent	Susan Thomas	108	3.7	
Independent	Michael James Thomas	86	3.0	
Independent	William Bell-Berry	30	1.0	
Turnout		2,921	41.40	
Registered electors		7,032		
Conservative gain from Independent				
Conservative gain from Independent				
Conservative win (new seat)				

Fairfield had been a two seat ward prior to the new boundaries which came into effect for this election.

=== Grangefield ===
Grangefield ward
Party	Candidate	Votes	%	±%
Labour	Carol Clark*	547	62.6	
Conservative	Louisa Anne Clarke	327	37.4	
Turnout		874	35.4	
Registered electors		2,486		
Labour hold		Swing		

Grangefield had been a two seat ward prior to the new boundaries which came into effect for this election.

=== Hardwick & Salters Lane ===
Hardwick & Salters Lane ward (2 seats)
Party	Candidate	Votes	%	±%
Labour	Norma Stephenson*	675	55.7	
Labour	Nigel Anthony Cooke*	654	54.0	
Reform	Craig Harker	349	28.8	
Reform	Graham Harker	267	22.0	
Conservative	Maureen Merifield	164	13.5	
Conservative	Judith Wellington	160	13.2	
Turnout		1,219	22.6	
Registered electors		5,399		
Labour hold				
Labour hold				

=== Hartburn ===
Hartburn (3 seats)
Party	Candidate	Votes	%	±%
Conservative	Lynn Elizabeth Hall	1,788	64.4	
Conservative	Niall Bell Innes	1,773	63.8	
Conservative	Jason John French	1,574	56.7	
Labour	Christopher Coombs	771	27.8	
Labour	Joanna Louise Tyler	681	24.5	
Green	Jessica Hobson	342	12.3	
Reform	Andrew Michael Elliott	264	9.5	
Reform	Andrew Frederick Stephenson	169	6.1	
Green	Kiran Singh	134	4.8	
Green	Jason Jordan	131	4.7	
Turnout		2,777	40.15	
Registered electors		6,930		
Conservative win (new seat)				
Conservative win (new seat)				
Conservative win (new seat)				

The election for Hartburn ward was postponed to 22 June 2023 following the death of one of the Reform UK candidates, Mike Elliott.

=== Ingleby Barwick North ===
Ingleby Barwick North ward (3 seats)
Party	Candidate	Votes	%	±%
Conservative	Sally Ann Watson*	874	36.0	
Independent	Edward Albert Strike* (Ted Strike)	848	34.9	
Conservative	Alan Watson*	827	34.1	
Ingleby Barwick Independent Society	Patricia Mary Faulks	824	34.0	
Ingleby Barwick Independent Society	Jason Stephen Keith Foreman	681	28.1	
Labour	Elizabeth Anne Wood	658	27.1	
Conservative	Jennifer Anne Rutland	650	26.8	
Ingleby Barwick Independent Society	Jean Patricia Kirby	583	24.0	
Green	Stephen James Harland	333	13.7	
Independent	Angela French	57	2.3	
Turnout		2,436	29.01	
Registered electors		8,398		
Conservative win (new seat)				
Independent win (new seat)				
Conservative win (new seat)				

=== Ingleby Barwick South ===
Ingleby Barwick South ward (3 seats)
Party	Candidate	Votes	%	±%
Ingleby Barwick Independent Society	Kevin Charles Faulks*	1,203	42.2	
Ingleby Barwick Independent Society	Michael Stefan Barnes	1,171	41.1	
Ingleby Barwick Independent Society	Ross Patterson*	1,111	39.0	
Conservative	James Alexander Irwin	1,017	35.7	
Conservative	Michelle Elizabeth Fryer	935	32.8	
Conservative	Stuart John Davies	880	30.9	
Labour	Kevin Mark Nicholas	648	22.7	
Green	David Peter Hobson	361	12.7	
Independent	Zoe Eleanor Mathers	262	9.2	
Reform	Anthony William Ellison (Tony Ellison)	124	4.4	
Independent	Erica Patricia Clough	54	1.9	
Independent	Michael Williamson	36	1.3	
Turnout		2,864	34.68	
Registered electors		8,259		
Ingleby Barwick Independent Society win (new seat)				
Ingleby Barwick Independent Society win (new seat)				
Ingleby Barwick Independent Society win (new seat)				

=== Mandale & Victoria ===
Mandale & Victoria ward (2 seats)
Party	Candidate	Votes	%	±%
Labour	Richard Francis Eglington	728	47.1	
Labour	Nathan Adam Gale	621	40.2	
Thornaby Independent Association	Stephen Francis Walmsley* (Steve Walmsley)	509	32.9	
Thornaby Independent Association	Christina Elsie Large* (Tina Large)	488	31.6	
Conservative	Lewis Martin Donegan	216	14.0	
Independent	Luke John Frost*	174	11.3	
Conservative	Anthony Hampton (Tony Hampton)	154	10.0	
Turnout		1,570	27.60	
Registered electors		5,688		
Labour gain from Thornaby Independent Association				
Labour gain from Thornaby Independent Association				

Mandale & Victoria had been a three seat ward prior to the new boundaries which came into effect for this election.

=== Newtown ===
Newtown ward
Party	Candidate	Votes	%	±%
Labour	Marilyn Margaret Surtees*	348	74.4	
Conservative	Lesley Anne Riordan	120	25.6	
Turnout		468	19.3	
Registered electors		2,455		
Labour hold		Swing		

Newtown had been a two seat ward prior to the new boundaries which came into effect for this election.

=== Northern Parishes ===
Northern Parishes ward (2 seats)
Party	Candidate	Votes	%	±%
Conservative	John David Gardner*	938	53.5	
Conservative	Vanessa Jane Sewell	934	53.3	
Independent	Stephen David Matthews* (Steve Matthews)	545	31.1	
Labour	Mark Colin McCarthy	496	28.3	
Turnout		1,766	34.26	
Registered electors		1,766		
Conservative hold				
Conservative win (new seat)				

Northern Parishes had been a one seat ward prior to the new boundaries which came into effect for this election.

=== Norton Central ===
Norton Central ward (2 seats)
Party	Candidate	Votes	%	±%
Labour	Steven l'Anson Nelson* (Steve Nelson)	719	49.1	
Labour	Lisa Jane Evans*	625	42.7	
Independent	Peter Mark Kirton Thompson (Tomo Thompson)	355	24.2	
Conservative	George Anthony Maxwell (Tony Maxwell)	325	22.2	
Conservative	Ann Marie Young	314	21.4	
Independent	Helen Deehan	238	16.2	
Independent	Ethan Joshua McGlade	174	11.9	
Turnout		1,468	31	
Registered electors		4,743		
Labour win (new seat)				
Labour win (new seat)				

=== Norton North ===
Norton North ward (2 seats)
Party	Candidate	Votes	%	±%
Conservative	Hilary Vickers*	1,408	54.5	
Conservative	Anthony Riordan* (Tony Riordan)	1,400	54.2	
Labour	David Matthew Wilburn	1,143	44.2	
Labour	Norma Margaret Wilburn	1,134	43.9	
Turnout		2,597	51.1	
Registered electors		5,080		
Conservative gain from Labour				
Conservative gain from Labour				

=== Norton South ===
Norton South ward (2 seats)
Party	Candidate	Votes	%	±%
Labour	Robert Cook* (Bob Cook)	931	73.3	
Labour	Eileen Johnson*	904	71.2	
Conservative	Geoffrey Nightscales	303	23.9	
Conservative	David John Smith	291	22.9	
Turnout		1,280	27.7	
Registered electors		4,626		
Labour hold				
Labour hold				

=== Ropner ===
Ropner ward (2 seats)
Party	Candidate	Votes	%	±%
Conservative	Shakeel Hussain	934	54.6	
Conservative	Muhammad Mubeen (Sufi Mubeen)	876	51.2	
Labour	Mohammed Javed*	739	43.2	
Labour	Kerri-Anne Prince (Kerri Prince)	721	42.2	
Turnout		1,727	33.7	
Registered electors		5,129		
Conservative win (new seat)				
Conservative win (new seat)				

=== Roseworth ===
Roseworth ward (2 seats)
Party	Candidate	Votes	%	±%
Labour	James Beall* (Jim Beall)	863	67.9	
Labour	Barbara Inman*	844	66.4	
Conservative	Marie Smailes	275	21.6	
Conservative	Jacqueline Anne Bright* (Jacky Bright)	253	19.9	
Reform	Martin Andrew Walker	107	8.4	
Turnout		1,277	22.3	
Registered electors		5,716		
Labour hold				
Labour hold				

=== Southern Villages ===
Southern Villages ward
Party	Candidate	Votes	%	±%
Conservative	Elsi Hampton	548	70.5	
Labour	Gail Andrea Chandler	229	29.5	
Turnout			42.0	
Registered electors		1,864		
Conservative win (new seat)				

=== Stainsby ===
Stainsby ward (2 seats)
Party	Candidate	Votes	%	±%
Thornaby Independent Association	Sylvia May Walmsley*	932	57.7	
Thornaby Independent Association	Raymond Godwin* (Ray Godwin)	900	55.8	
Labour	Benjamin John Lamb (Ben Lamb)	415	25.7	
Labour	Zac Joseph Curtis Higginbotham	405	25.1	
Conservative	John Michael Dent	237	14.7	
Conservative	Sarah Louise Dent	221	13.7	
Turnout		1,620	29.2	
Registered electors		5,557		
Thornaby Independent Association hold				
Thornaby Independent Association hold				

=== Stockton Town Centre ===
Stockton Town Centre ward (2 seats)
Party	Candidate	Votes	%	±%
Labour	Pauline Beall*	731	63.2	
Labour	Paul Rowling	629	54.4	
Conservative	Allison Kendra Williams	318	27.5	
Conservative	Mohamed Marouf (Mohamed Mazi)	286	24.7	
Independent	Alan Hardy	160	13.8	
Turnout		1,159	23.4	
Registered electors		4,953		
Labour hold				
Labour hold				

=== Village ===
Village ward (2 seats)
Party	Candidate	Votes	%	±%
Thornaby Independent Association	Michael Moore* (Mick Moore)	806	53.7	
Thornaby Independent Association	Ian John Dalgarno*	783	52.2	
Conservative	Julia Dawn Cooper (Julie Cooper)	383	25.5	
Labour	Paul Adrian Jenkins	321	21.4	
Conservative	Timothy David Cunniffe (Tim Cunniffe)	305	20.3	
Labour	Daniel Michael Smith	281	18.7	
Turnout		1,512	27.7	
Registered electors		5,452		
Thornaby Independent Association hold				
Thornaby Independent Association hold				

=== Yarm ===
Yarm ward (3 seats)
Party	Candidate	Votes	%	±%
Conservative	Andrew Bickers Liddell Sherris*	1,805	59.0	
Conservative	Daniel John Fagan* (Dan Fagan)	1,612	52.7	
Conservative	John Herbert Coulson	1,575	51.5	
Labour	John Charles Butler	803	26.3	
Independent	Pamela Smailes	802	26.2	
Independent	Barbara Wegg	748	24.5	
Green	Jason Walter Jordan	600	19.6	
Turnout		3,065	38.8	
Registered electors		7,893		
Conservative hold				
Conservative hold				
Conservative hold				

== By-elections ==
=== Eaglescliffe West ===
Eaglescliffe West by-election: 10 December 2025 Resignation of Laura Tunney
Party	Candidate	Votes	%	±%
Conservative	Stephen John Dodds	1,194	60.9	+0.6
Reform	Rick MacDonald	470	24	+17.2
Green	Danny Reed	150	7.6	−0.8
Labour	Frank William Saul	147	7.5	−23.7
Turnout		1,961	35.84	−4.86
Registered electors		4,934		
Conservative hold		Swing		
