= Stockton-on-Tees Borough Council =

Unitary authority in England

Type
- Type: Unitary authority

Leadership
- Mayor: Bob Cook, Labour since 1 April 2026
- Leader: Lisa Evans, Labour since 2 April 2025
- Managing Director: Mike Greene since 2022

Structure
- Seats: 56 councillors
- Political groups: Administration (22) Labour (22) Other parties (34) Conservative (26) Thornaby Ind. (4) Ingleby Barwick Ind. (3) Independent (1)

Elections
- Last election: 4 May 2023
- Next election: 6 May 2027

Meeting place
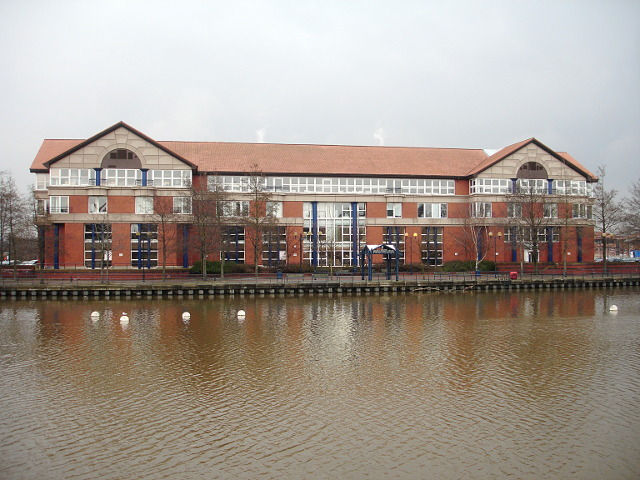
- Dunedin House, Columbia Drive, Thornaby, Stockton-on-Tees, TS17 6BJ

Website
- stockton.gov.uk

Stockton-on-Tees Borough Council is the local authority of the Borough of Stockton-on-Tees, which straddles the ceremonial counties of County Durham and North Yorkshire in England. Since 1996 the council has been a unitary authority, being a district council which also performs the functions of a county council. It therefore provides services including Council Tax billing, libraries, social services, town planning, waste collection and disposal, and it is a local education authority. Since 2016 the council has been a member of the Tees Valley Combined Authority, which has been led by the directly elected Tees Valley Mayor since 2017.

== History ==
The town of Stockton-on-Tees was an ancient borough. The borough's date of creation is unknown, but Stockton was being described as a borough by 1283. The original borough had a very tightly drawn boundary; by 1835 it was said that the borough only covered a quarter of the urban area. The borough was reformed to become a municipal borough in 1836 under the Municipal Corporations Act 1835, which standardised how many boroughs operated across the country. The borough was then administered by a body formally called the "mayor, aldermen and burgesses of the borough of Stockton", generally known as the corporation, town council or borough council. The boundaries were extended on several occasions, notably in 1852, 1889 and 1913 (in which year it gained Norton and Hartburn).

That council was abolished in 1968 and replaced by the short-lived County Borough of Teesside from 1968 to 1974. Under the Local Government Act 1972 a new non-metropolitan district called Stockton-on-Tees was established, with a larger territory than the pre-1968 borough. County-level services were provided by Cleveland County Council until its abolition in 1996, when Stockton-on-Tees became a unitary authority. The way this change was implemented was to create a new non-metropolitan county of Stockton-on-Tees covering the same area as the existing borough, but with no separate county council; instead the existing borough council took on county functions, making it a unitary authority. At the same time, the borough was declared to straddle County Durham (north of the River Tees) and North Yorkshire (south of the river) for ceremonial purposes.

== Governance ==
The local authority derives its powers and functions from the Local Government Act 1972 and subsequent legislation. For the purposes of local government, Stockton-on-Tees is within a non-metropolitan area of England. As a unitary authority, Stockton-on-Tees Borough Council has the powers and functions of both a non-metropolitan county and district council combined. In its capacity as a district council it is a billing authority collecting Council Tax and business rates, it processes local planning applications, it is responsible for housing, waste collection and environmental health. In its capacity as a county council it is a local education authority, responsible for social services, libraries and waste disposal.

Since 2016 the council has been a member of the Tees Valley Combined Authority.

=== Political control ===
The council has been under no overall control since 2019. Following the 2023 election the Conservatives were the largest party, but a minority Labour administration was able to retain control with the informal support of the two smaller parties, the Thornaby Independent Association and the Ingleby Barwick Independent Society.

Political control of the council since its re-establishment in 1974 has been as follows:

Non-metropolitan district

Party in control	Years
Labour	1974–1976
Conservative	1976–1979
Labour	1979–1991
No overall control	1991–1996

Unitary authority

Party in control	Years
Labour	1996–2005
No overall control	2005–2015
Labour	2015–2019
No overall control	2019–present

=== Leadership ===
The role of mayor is largely ceremonial in Stockton-on-Tees, with political leadership instead provided by the leader of the council. The leaders since 1974 have been:

Councillor	Party	From	To
Peter Bonar	Labour	1974	1983
Jim Cooke	Labour	1983	1990
Bob Gibson	Labour	1990	May 2007
Ken Lupton	Conservative	23 May 2007	May 2011
Bob Cook	Labour	25 May 2011	2 April 2025
Lisa Evans	Labour	2 April 2025	Incumbent

=== Composition ===
Following the 2023 election the composition of the council was:

Party	Councillors
Conservative	26
Labour	22
Thornaby Independent Association	4
Ingleby Barwick Independent Society	3
Independent	1
Total	56

The next election is due in 2027.

== Elections ==
Since the last boundary changes in 2023 the council has comprised 56 councillors representing 27 wards, with each ward election one, two or three councillors. Elections are held every four years.

== Premises ==
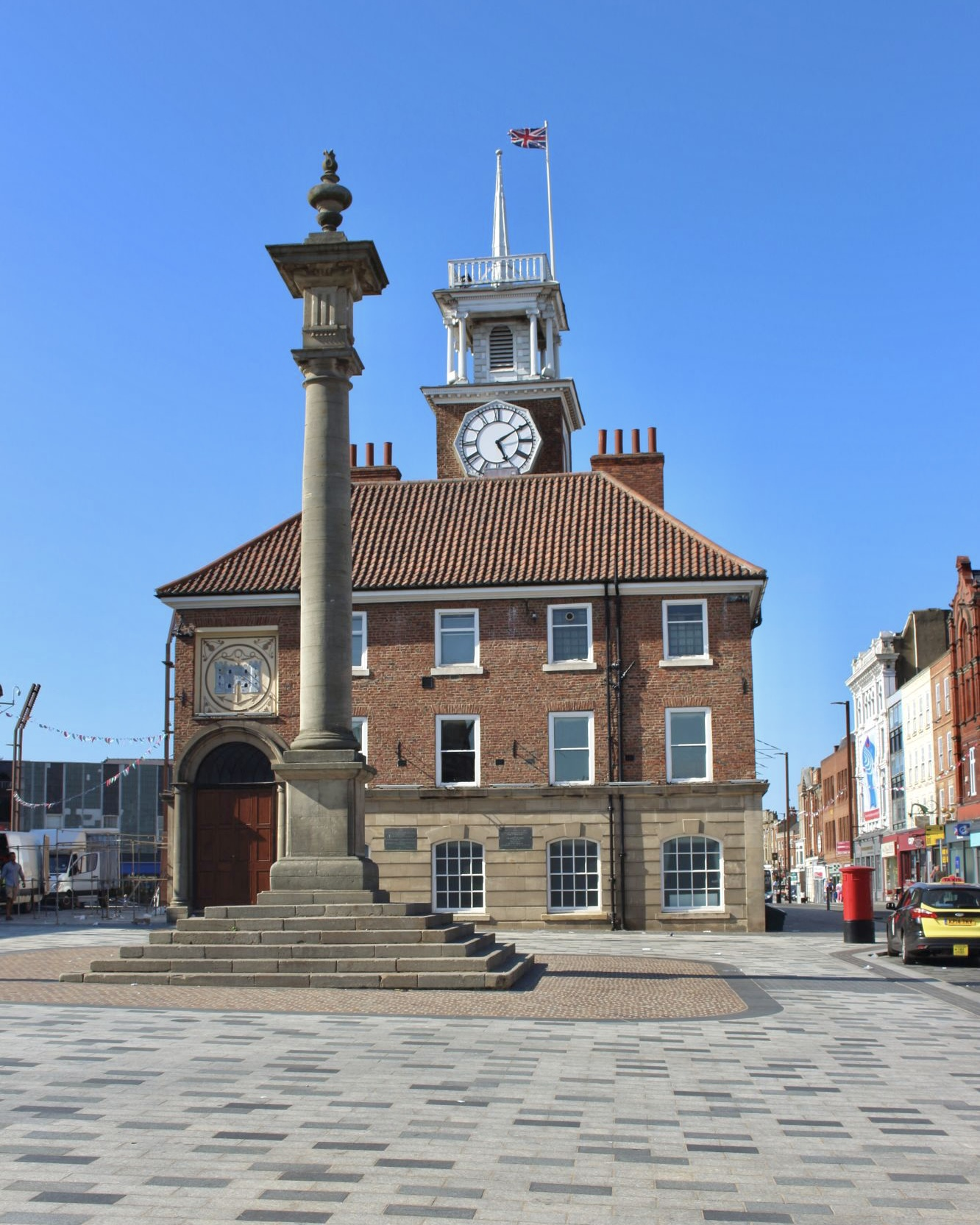
Town Hall, council's meeting place until 2020.

Since 2021, full council meetings have been held at Stockton Baptist Church or the conference suite at the town's library. Prior to the suspension of in-person meetings during the COVID-19 pandemic in 2020, full council meetings were generally held at Stockton Town Hall in the High Street, which was built in 1735.

The council's main offices are at Dunedin House on Columbia Drive on the south bank of the River Tees in Thornaby, which had been completed in 1992. The council bought the building in 2021 and converted it to become the council's headquarters, which opened in 2024. Customer service centres are maintained at the libraries in Stockton, Billingham and Thornaby.

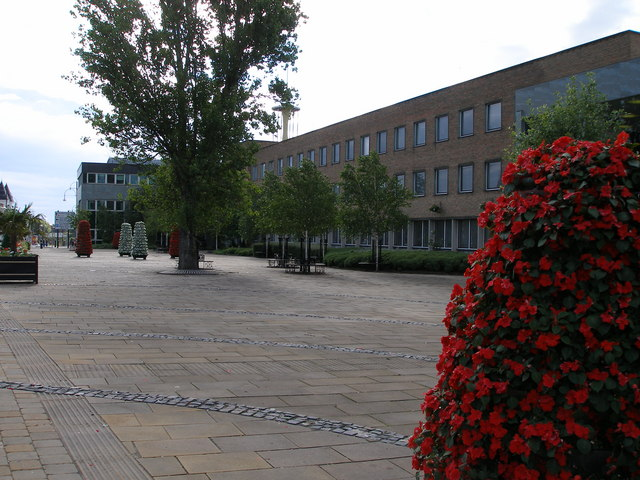
Municipal Buildings, Church Road: Built 1961 for old borough council and served as modern council's headquarters 1974–2024

Prior to 2024, the council's main offices were at the Municipal Buildings on Church Road in Stockton, which was purpose-built for the old borough council and opened in 1961.
